= Mr. Monk and the Man Who Shot Santa Claus =

- Monk episode
- Episode no.: Season 6 Episode 10
- Directed by: Randall Zisk
- Written by: Dan Schofield; Ben Gruber
- Production code: #610
- Original air date: December 7, 2007

Guest appearances
- Larry Miller as Garrett Price; Emmy Clarke as Julie Teeger; Stanley Kamel as Dr. Charles Kroger; Randle Mell as Michael Kenworthy; Dorothy Constantine as Alice Dubois; Gina Philips as Brandy Barber

Episode chronology
← Previous "Mr. Monk Is Up All Night"	Next → "Mr. Monk Joins a Cult"
- Monk (season 6)

"Mr. Monk and the Man Who Shot Santa Claus" is the tenth episode of the sixth season of the American comedy-drama detective television series Monk, and the show's 87th episode overall. The series follows Adrian Monk (Tony Shalhoub), a private detective with obsessive–compulsive disorder and multiple phobias, and his assistant Natalie Teeger (Traylor Howard). In this episode, Monk is labeled by media as a social pariah as he is accused of shooting a man dressed in Santa Claus apparel, and must prove his innocence.

It was written by Dan Schofield and Ben Gruber, and directed by Randall Zisk. Though it was filmed in August, "Mr. Monk and the Man Who Shot Santa Claus" is the third annual Christmas special of the series. When the episode first aired in the United States on the USA Network on December 7, 2007, it was watched by over 4.5 million viewers. Critics gave it mixed reception, with most criticizing how Trudy, Monk's deceased wife, was mentioned and that no more details were given.

== Plot ==
Natalie Teeger is fighting traffic to get Adrian Monk to his appointment with his psychiatrist, Dr. Kroger. They are at a dead stop. Monk says he hates Christmas. Natalie confides to her daughter Julie that Monk's wife, Trudy, died in December ten years ago. A retired parole officer in a Santa Claus outfit, Michael Kenworthy, tosses toys to passers-by from a roof. Furious, Monk heads up, and Natalie and Julie hear shots. On the roof, they see Monk holding a gun, and Kenworthy shot. Captain Stottlemeyer and Lieutenant Disher arrest Monk. Monk says that Kenworthy is the owner of the gun, and he shot him in self-defense, but Kenworthy denies this, saying Monk attacked him.

Reporter Brandy Barber dubs Monk as "The Man Who Shot Santa Claus" in a broadcast, and he and Natalie are harassed everywhere they go. Meanwhile, Stottlemeyer and Disher interrogate Kenworthy about his meetings with ex-cons, but Kenworthy kicks them out. That night, Alice Dubois, a MacMillan Museum employee, is killed by Kenworthy.

In session with Dr. Kroger, Monk remembers one Christmas, his father gave him a single walkie-talkie and explained that Monk had no use for a second one because he has no friends. This makes Monk realize that a lone walkie-talkie in Kenworthy's bag could not have been one of his gifts. Monk and Natalie return to the roof where the shooting took place. He explains that Kenworthy contacted his ex-cons to carry out a heist of the MacMillan Museum, with Kenworthy acting as the diversion, dropping toys to stop traffic. However, the robbery was ruined when Kenworthy was shot. That day was chosen for the heist because one of Kenworthy's accomplices, Carl, was on duty in the museum. As Carl's hours were not good to carry out a second heist, Kenworthy killed Dubois, so Carl could fill in for her.

Natalie looks down and sees a trucker with a walkie-talkie stopped in the intersection. They realize the second heist is in progress. Monk races downstairs, instructing Natalie to call the police. Monk pursues Kenworthy until Monk knocks him unconscious. Kenworthy and his accomplices are arrested, and the museum exhibit "the Star of Bethlehem" is recovered. Barber goes on television, praising Monk as "The Man Who Saved Christmas." Natalie and Julie spend Christmas Eve at his apartment, and coax Monk to smile for a group photograph.

== Production ==
"Mr. Monk and the Man Who Shot Santa Claus" was co-written by Dan Schofield and Ben Gruber, and directed by Randall Zisk. After the airing of the ninth episode of the sixth season, "Mr. Monk Is Up All Night", on September 14, 2007, Monk broadcast entered a hiatus until January. The cast and staff, however, returned in August to work on the second half of the show's sixth season, which they called "Season 6.5". Hayley Helmreich, a series associate producer, remarked that it was difficult to have the "Christmas-y feeling" in August in Los Angeles. Helmreich also found difficulties to get a company that would agree to have their toys being thrown by "a not-so-nice Santa Claus".

The staff had the idea to close the episode with a choir of children singing the Monk's theme "It's a Jungle Out There". Additionally, it would feature a wide shot of the entire cast and crew who had been involved in the six seasons of the series, as well as network and studio executives, former guest stars and directors, and the theme's singer Randy Newman. The centerpiece would be Howard along with her son Sabu. However, due to scheduling issues, they could not bring them all together.

Larry Miller, who previously appeared in third season episode "Mr. Monk Gets Stuck in Traffic", returned as "the only notable guest appearance", according to IGN's James Chamberlin, for "Mr. Monk and the Man Who Shot Santa Claus" as Monk's lawyer, Garrett Price.

== Reception ==
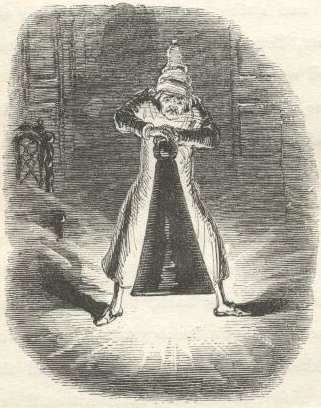
Ebenezer Scrooge, as illustrated by John Leech, in Charles Dickens's A Christmas Carol. While Cinema Blend wrote Monk was turned into "some kind of Scrooge", DVD Verdict said "Monk joins the ranks of Grinch and Scrooge" for shooting Santa in the episode.

"Mr. Monk and the Man Who Shot Santa Claus" was first broadcast in the United States on USAHD at 6 pm EST on December 7, 2007. The USA Network regular channel aired it at 9 pm EST on the same day. According to Nielsen Media Research, the episode was viewed by an estimated 4.546 million viewers, making it the tenth most watched program on cable television that week. It was the day's most watched among cable television shows, with 1.6 million viewers among adults ages 18 to 49, and 1.8 million viewers among adults ages 25 to 54. Time shifted viewing increased the episode's audience to a total of 5.138 million.

Critic David Bianculli included it on his list of the best programs to air episodes that day, comparing it to "Who shot J.R.?" and "Who Shot Mr. Burns?". Melanie McFarland from Seattle Post-Intelligencer commented that the idea of Monk shooting Santa Claus was "hilarious". Michael Storey of the Arkansas Democrat-Gazette called it "a hoot and well worth your time", while United Feature Syndicate's Kevin McDonough deemed it "exceptional". Cinema Blend's Kelly West said it had not enough of the "touchy-feely stuff" expected in a Christmas-themed episode, and that it was not "all that different from any other episode in terms of the story", but felt it was "full of laughs and definitely worth watching, if only to see Monk throw down with Santa."

James Chamberlin of IGN was "excited to see the show return" for a Christmas special but was disappointed in the underutilization of Miller's character, and the lack of any further clues to the mystery surrounding the death of Adrian Monk's wife, Trudy, despite several mentions of the event during the episode. Ted Cox of the Chicago-area Daily Herald stated that the episode was "not even as good as last year's Christmas special" ("Mr. Monk Meets His Dad"), and also laments mention of Trudy's unsolved murder without the "element of lost love" that "made the early 'Monks' great". In the same vein, Diane Werts, writing for Newsday, declared it was "[a]nother opportunity missed" to deepen into Trudy's death. Comparing it to Psych episode "Gus's Dad May Have Killed an Old Guy", David Kronke of Los Angeles Daily News said "Psych manages [to inveigle viewers to feel the holiday spirit] tonight; Monk, not so much." Although the plot is "easy to figure out", Chicago Tribune's Maureen Ryan criticized how the episode "seem[s] a bit flat".
