= List of Monk episodes =

The following is a complete episode list for the criminal dramedy television series Monk. It premiered on the USA Network on July 12, 2002, in the United States and ended with a two-part series finale on November 27 and December 4, 2009. The complete series has a total of 125 episodes, including three 2-part episodes and four Christmas specials.

A follow-up film, entitled Mr. Monk's Last Case was released on Peacock, on December 8, 2023.

== Series overview ==
| Season | Episodes | Originally released | |
| Season | Episodes | First released | Last released |
|---|---|---|---|
| 1 | 13 | July 12, 2002 | October 18, 2002 |
| 2 | 16 | June 20, 2003 | March 5, 2004 |
| 3 | 16 | June 18, 2004 | March 4, 2005 |
| 4 | 16 | July 8, 2005 | March 17, 2006 |
| 5 | 16 | July 7, 2006 | March 2, 2007 |
| 6 | 16 | July 13, 2007 | February 22, 2008 |
| 7 | 16 | July 18, 2008 | February 20, 2009 |
| 8 | 16 | August 7, 2009 | December 4, 2009 |

== Episodes ==
=== Season 1 (2002) ===
| No. overall | No. in season | Title | Directed by | Written by | Original release date | U.S. viewers (millions) |
|---|---|---|---|---|---|---|
| 1 | 1 | "Mr. Monk and the Candidate" | Dean Parisot | Andy Breckman | July 12, 2002 | 4.76 |
| 2 | 2 | "Mr. Monk and the Candidate" | Dean Parisot | Andy Breckman | July 12, 2002 | 4.76 |
| 3 | 3 | "Mr. Monk and the Psychic" | Kevin Inch | John Romano | July 19, 2002 | 4.06 |
| 4 | 4 | "Mr. Monk Meets Dale the Whale" | Rob Thompson | Andy Breckman | July 26, 2002 | 4.87 |
| 5 | 5 | "Mr. Monk Goes to the Carnival" | Randall Zisk | Siobhan Byrne | August 2, 2002 | 4.91 |
| 6 | 6 | "Mr. Monk Goes to the Asylum" | Nick Marck | Tom Scharpling and David Breckman | August 9, 2002 | 4.48 |
| 7 | 7 | "Mr. Monk and the Billionaire Mugger" | Stephen Cragg | Timothy J. Lea | August 16, 2002 | 4.46 |
| 8 | 8 | "Mr. Monk and the Other Woman" | Adam Arkin | David M. Stern | August 23, 2002 | 3.70 |
| 9 | 9 | "Mr. Monk and the Marathon Man" | Adam Davidson | Mitch Markowitz | September 13, 2002 | 4.86 |
| 10 | 10 | "Mr. Monk Takes a Vacation" | Kevin Inch | Hy Conrad | September 20, 2002 | N/A |
| 11 | 11 | "Mr. Monk and the Earthquake" | Adam Shankman | Tom Scharpling and David Breckman | October 4, 2002 | N/A |
| 12 | 12 | "Mr. Monk and the Red-Headed Stranger" | Milan Cheylov | Andy Breckman and Tom Scharpling | October 11, 2002 | N/A |
| 13 | 13 | "Mr. Monk and the Airplane" | Rob Thompson | David M. Stern | October 18, 2002 | 4.25 |

- A (HH) listed next to a viewership number indicates the number of household viewers, and a (25-54) indicates the number of viewers aged 25-54. These are only used if total viewership numbers were unavailable for that particular episode.

=== Season 2 (2003–04) ===
| No. overall | No. in season | Title | Directed by | Written by | Original release date | U.S. viewers (millions) |
|---|---|---|---|---|---|---|
| 14 | 1 | "Mr. Monk Goes Back to School" | Randall Zisk | Story by : David Breckman and Rick Kronberg; Teleplay by : David Breckman | June 20, 2003 | 5.43 |
| 15 | 2 | "Mr. Monk Goes to Mexico" | Ron Underwood | Lee Goldberg and William Rabkin | June 27, 2003 | 4.03 |
| 16 | 3 | "Mr. Monk Goes to the Ballgame" | Michael Spiller | Hy Conrad | July 11, 2003 | 3.64 |
| 17 | 4 | "Mr. Monk Goes to the Circus" | Randall Zisk | James Krieg | July 18, 2003 | 4.07 |
| 18 | 5 | "Mr. Monk and the Very, Very Old Man" | Lawrence Trilling | Daniel Dratch | July 25, 2003 | 3.65 |
| 19 | 6 | "Mr. Monk Goes to the Theater" | Ron Underwood | Story by : Wendy Mass and Stu Levine; Teleplay by : Tom Scharpling | August 1, 2003 | 4.70 |
| 20 | 7 | "Mr. Monk and the Sleeping Suspect" | Jerry Levine | Karl Schaefer | August 8, 2003 | 4.52 |
| 21 | 8 | "Mr. Monk Meets the Playboy" | Tom DiCillo | James Krieg | August 15, 2003 | 2.79 (HH) |
| 22 | 9 | "Mr. Monk and the 12th Man" | Michael Zinberg | Michael Angeli | August 22, 2003 | 4.36 |
| 23 | 10 | "Mr. Monk and the Paperboy" | Michael Fresco | David Breckman and Hy Conrad | January 16, 2004 | 5.95 |
| 24 | 11 | "Mr. Monk and the Three Pies" | Randall Zisk | Tom Scharpling and Daniel Dratch | January 23, 2004 | 4.94 |
| 25 | 12 | "Mr. Monk and the TV Star" | Randall Zisk | Tom Scharpling | January 30, 2004 | 6.27 |
| 26 | 13 | "Mr. Monk and the Missing Granny" | Tony Bill | Joe Toplyn | February 6, 2004 | 5.52 |
| 27 | 14 | "Mr. Monk and the Captain's Wife" | Jerry Levine | Story by : Andy Breckman and Beth Landou; Teleplay by : Andy Breckman | February 13, 2004 | 5.60 |
| 28 | 15 | "Mr. Monk Gets Married" | Craig Zisk | David Breckman | February 27, 2004 | 4.77 |
| 29 | 16 | "Mr. Monk Goes to Jail" | Jerry Levine | Chris Manheim | March 5, 2004 | 5.51 |

- A (HH) listed next to a viewership number indicates the number of household viewers. These are only used if total viewership numbers were unavailable for that particular episode.

=== Season 3 (2004–05) ===
| No. overall | No. in season | Title | Directed by | Written by | Original release date | U.S. viewers (millions) |
|---|---|---|---|---|---|---|
| 30 | 1 | "Mr. Monk Takes Manhattan" | Randall Zisk | Andy Breckman | June 18, 2004 | 5.54 |
| 31 | 2 | "Mr. Monk and the Panic Room" | Jerry Levine | David Breckman and Joe Toplyn | June 25, 2004 | 4.70 |
| 32 | 3 | "Mr. Monk and the Blackout" | Michael Zinberg | Daniel Dratch and Hy Conrad | July 9, 2004 | 4.55 |
| 33 | 4 | "Mr. Monk Gets Fired" | Andrei Belgrader | Peter Wolk | July 16, 2004 | 4.68 |
| 34 | 5 | "Mr. Monk Meets the Godfather" | Michael Zinberg | Lee Goldberg and William Rabkin | July 23, 2004 | 4.73 |
| 35 | 6 | "Mr. Monk and the Girl Who Cried Wolf" | Jerry Levine | Hy Conrad | July 30, 2004 | 5.40 |
| 36 | 7 | "Mr. Monk and the Employee of the Month" | Scott Foley | Ross Abrash | August 6, 2004 | 5.77 |
| 37 | 8 | "Mr. Monk and the Game Show" | Randall Zisk | Daniel Dratch | August 13, 2004 | 4.85 |
| 38 | 9 | "Mr. Monk Takes His Medicine" | Randall Zisk | Story by : Tom Scharpling and Chuck Sklar; Teleplay by : Tom Scharpling | August 20, 2004 | 5.88 |
| 39 | 10 | "Mr. Monk and the Red Herring" | Randall Zisk | Andy Breckman | January 21, 2005 | 5.50 |
| 40 | 11 | "Mr. Monk vs. the Cobra" | Anthony R. Palmieri | Joe Toplyn | January 28, 2005 | 4.10 |
| 41 | 12 | "Mr. Monk Gets Cabin Fever" | Jerry Levine | Hy Conrad | February 4, 2005 | 5.00 |
| 42 | 13 | "Mr. Monk Gets Stuck in Traffic" | Jerry Levine | Tom Scharpling and Joe Toplyn | February 11, 2005 | 5.02 |
| 43 | 14 | "Mr. Monk Goes to Vegas" | Randall Zisk | Story by : Tom Scharpling and David Breckman; Teleplay by : Daniel Dratch and Joe Toplyn | February 18, 2005 | 5.40 |
| 44 | 15 | "Mr. Monk and the Election" | Allison Liddi | Nell Scovell | February 25, 2005 | 4.85 |
| 45 | 16 | "Mr. Monk and the Kid" | Andrei Belgrader | Tom Scharpling | March 4, 2005 | 4.44 |

=== Season 4 (2005–06) ===
| No. overall | No. in season | Title | Directed by | Written by | Original release date | U.S. viewers (millions) |
|---|---|---|---|---|---|---|
| 46 | 1 | "Mr. Monk and the Other Detective" | Eric Laneuville | Hy Conrad | July 8, 2005 | 6.38 |
| 47 | 2 | "Mr. Monk Goes Home Again" | Randall Zisk | Tom Scharpling | July 15, 2005 | 4.97 |
| 48 | 3 | "Mr. Monk Stays in Bed" | Philip Casnoff | Hy Conrad | July 22, 2005 | 4.51 |
| 49 | 4 | "Mr. Monk Goes to the Office" | Jerry Levine | Nell Scovell | July 29, 2005 | 4.66 |
| 50 | 5 | "Mr. Monk Gets Drunk" | Andrei Belgrader | Daniel Dratch | August 5, 2005 | 3.82 |
| 51 | 6 | "Mr. Monk and Mrs. Monk" | Randall Zisk | David Breckman | August 12, 2005 | 4.41 |
| 52 | 7 | "Mr. Monk Goes to a Wedding" | Anthony R. Palmieri | Liz Sagal | August 19, 2005 | 5.51 |
| 53 | 8 | "Mr. Monk and Little Monk" | Robert Singer | Joe Toplyn | August 26, 2005 | 5.28 |
| 54 | 9 | "Mr. Monk and the Secret Santa" | Jerry Levine | David Breckman | December 2, 2005 | 5.48 |
| 55 | 10 | "Mr. Monk Goes to a Fashion Show" | Randall Zisk | Jonathan Collier | January 13, 2006 | 5.40 |
| 56 | 11 | "Mr. Monk Bumps His Head" | Stephen Surjik | Andy Breckman | January 20, 2006 | 6.00 |
| 57 | 12 | "Mr. Monk and the Captain's Marriage" | Philip Casnoff | Jack Bernstein | January 27, 2006 | 5.35 |
| 58 | 13 | "Mr. Monk and the Big Reward" | Randall Zisk | Tom Scharpling and Daniel Dratch | February 3, 2006 | 5.55 |
| 59 | 14 | "Mr. Monk and the Astronaut" | Randall Zisk | David Breckman and Joe Toplyn | March 3, 2006 | 4.89 |
| 60 | 15 | "Mr. Monk Goes to the Dentist" | Jefery Levy | Story by : Daniel Dratch and Joe Toplyn; Teleplay by : David Breckman and Tom Scharpling | March 10, 2006 | 4.46 |
| 61 | 16 | "Mr. Monk Gets Jury Duty" | Andrei Belgrader | Peter Wolk | March 17, 2006 | 5.36 |

=== Season 5 (2006–07) ===
| No. overall | No. in season | Title | Directed by | Written by | Original release date | U.S. viewers (millions) |
|---|---|---|---|---|---|---|
| 62 | 1 | "Mr. Monk and the Actor" | Randall Zisk | Hy Conrad and Joe Toplyn | July 7, 2006 | 5.09 |
| 63 | 2 | "Mr. Monk and the Garbage Strike" | Jerry Levine | Andy Breckman and Daniel Gaeta | July 14, 2006 | 4.89 |
| 64 | 3 | "Mr. Monk and the Big Game" | Chris Long | Jack Bernstein | July 21, 2006 | 5.09 |
| 65 | 4 | "Mr. Monk Can't See a Thing" | Stephen Surjik | Lee Goldberg and William Rabkin | July 28, 2006 | 5.20 |
| 66 | 5 | "Mr. Monk, Private Eye" | Peter Weller | Tom Scharpling and Daniel Gaeta | August 4, 2006 | 5.28 |
| 67 | 6 | "Mr. Monk and the Class Reunion" | David Grossman | Daniel Dratch | August 11, 2006 | 5.60 |
| 68 | 7 | "Mr. Monk Gets a New Shrink" | Andrei Belgrader | Hy Conrad | August 18, 2006 | 5.21 |
| 69 | 8 | "Mr. Monk Goes to a Rock Concert" | Randall Zisk | Blair Singer | August 25, 2006 | 5.63 |
| 70 | 9 | "Mr. Monk Meets His Dad" | Jerry Levine | Tom Scharpling and Daniel Dratch | November 17, 2006 | 3.95 |
| 71 | 10 | "Mr. Monk and the Leper" | Randall Zisk | Charles Evered and Joe Karter | December 22, 2006 | N/A |
| 72 | 11 | "Mr. Monk Makes a Friend" | Randall Zisk | Andy Breckman and Daniel Gaeta | January 19, 2007 | 5.16 |
| 73 | 12 | "Mr. Monk Is At Your Service" | Anton Cropper | Rob LaZebnik | January 26, 2007 | 5.00 |
| 74 | 13 | "Mr. Monk Is On the Air" | Mike Listo | Josh Siegal and Dylan Morgan | February 2, 2007 | 5.16 |
| 75 | 14 | "Mr. Monk Visits a Farm" | Andrei Belgrader | David Breckman | February 9, 2007 | 4.86 |
| 76 | 15 | "Mr. Monk and the Really, Really Dead Guy" | Anthony R. Palmieri and Draco Savage | Joe Toplyn | February 23, 2007 | 4.71 |
| 77 | 16 | "Mr. Monk Goes to the Hospital" | Wendey Stanzler | Jonathan Collier | March 2, 2007 | 5.71 |

=== Season 6 (2007–08) ===
| No. overall | No. in season | Title | Directed by | Written by | Original release date | U.S. viewers (millions) |
|---|---|---|---|---|---|---|
| 78 | 1 | "Mr. Monk and His Biggest Fan" | Randall Zisk | Andy Breckman | July 13, 2007 | 4.82 |
| 79 | 2 | "Mr. Monk and the Rapper" | Paris Barclay | Daniel Dratch | July 20, 2007 | 4.88 |
| 80 | 3 | "Mr. Monk and the Naked Man" | Randall Zisk | Tom Gammill and Max Pross | July 27, 2007 | 5.01 |
| 81 | 4 | "Mr. Monk and the Bad Girlfriend" | Wendey Stanzler | Joe Toplyn | August 3, 2007 | 4.31 |
| 82 | 5 | "Mr. Monk and the Birds and the Bees" | Michael W. Watkins | Peter Wolk | August 10, 2007 | 5.10 |
| 83 | 6 | "Mr. Monk and the Buried Treasure" | Sam Weisman | Jonathan Collier | August 17, 2007 | 4.54 |
| 84 | 7 | "Mr. Monk and the Daredevil" | Jonathan Collier | Alan Zweibel | August 24, 2007 | 5.03 |
| 85 | 8 | "Mr. Monk and the Wrong Man" | Anton Cropper | Salvatore Savo | September 7, 2007 | 4.39 |
| 86 | 9 | "Mr. Monk Is Up All Night" | Randall Zisk | David Breckman | September 14, 2007 | 4.52 |
| 87 | 10 | "Mr. Monk and the Man Who Shot Santa Claus" | Randall Zisk | Daniel Schofield and Ben Gruber | December 7, 2007 | 4.55 |
| 88 | 11 | "Mr. Monk Joins a Cult" | Anton Cropper | Josh Siegal and Dylan Morgan | January 11, 2008 | 5.65 |
| 89 | 12 | "Mr. Monk Goes to the Bank" | Michael W. Watkins | Hy Conrad | January 18, 2008 | 5.46 |
| 90 | 13 | "Mr. Monk and the Three Julies" | David Breckman | Tom Scharpling and Joe Toplyn | January 25, 2008 | 5.32 |
| 91 | 14 | "Mr. Monk Paints His Masterpiece" | Andrei Belgrader | Jon Wurster | February 1, 2008 | 5.45 |
| 92 | 15 | "Mr. Monk Is on the Run (Part One)" | Randall Zisk | Tom Scharpling | February 15, 2008 | 5.60 |
| 93 | 16 | "Mr. Monk Is on the Run (Part Two)" | Randall Zisk | Hy Conrad and Daniel Dratch | February 22, 2008 | 6.88 |

=== Season 7 (2008–09) ===
| No. overall | No. in season | Title | Directed by | Written by | Original release date | U.S. viewers (millions) |
|---|---|---|---|---|---|---|
| 94 | 1 | "Mr. Monk Buys a House" | Randall Zisk | Story by : Andy Breckman and Anthony Maranville; Teleplay by : Andy Breckman | July 18, 2008 | 5.64 |
| 95 | 2 | "Mr. Monk and the Genius" | Michael W. Watkins | Joe Toplyn | July 25, 2008 | 5.06 |
| 96 | 3 | "Mr. Monk Gets Lotto Fever" | Michael Zinberg | Hy Conrad | August 1, 2008 | 4.60 |
| 97 | 4 | "Mr. Monk Takes a Punch" | Barnet Kellman | Salvatore Savo | August 8, 2008 | 3.62 |
| 98 | 5 | "Mr. Monk Is Underwater" | Paris Barclay | Jack Bernstein | August 15, 2008 | 4.65 |
| 99 | 6 | "Mr. Monk Falls in Love" | Arlene Sanford | Josh Siegal and Dylan Morgan | August 22, 2008 | 4.57 |
| 100 | 7 | "Mr. Monk's 100th Case" | Randall Zisk | Tom Scharpling | September 5, 2008 | 4.99 |
| 101 | 8 | "Mr. Monk Gets Hypnotized" | Michael W. Watkins | Tom Gammill and Max Pross | September 12, 2008 | 5.02 |
| 102 | 9 | "Mr. Monk and the Miracle" | Andrei Belgrader | Peter Wolk | November 28, 2008 | 4.39 |
| 103 | 10 | "Mr. Monk's Other Brother" | David Hoberman | David Breckman | January 9, 2009 | 5.24 |
| 104 | 11 | "Mr. Monk on Wheels" | Anton Cropper | Nell Scovell | January 16, 2009 | 4.94 |
| 105 | 12 | "Mr. Monk and the Lady Next Door" | Tawnia McKiernan | Hy Conrad and Joe Toplyn | January 23, 2009 | 4.96 |
| 106 | 13 | "Mr. Monk Makes the Playoffs" | Randall Zisk | Josh Siegal and Dylan Morgan | January 30, 2009 | 5.39 |
| 107 | 14 | "Mr. Monk and the Bully" | David Breckman | Joe Ventura | February 6, 2009 | 5.67 |
| 108 | 15 | "Mr. Monk and the Magician" | Randall Zisk | Andy Breckman | February 13, 2009 | 5.11 |
| 109 | 16 | "Mr. Monk Fights City Hall" | Chuck Parker | Tom Scharpling and Josh Siegal and Dylan Morgan | February 20, 2009 | 5.54 |

=== Season 8 (2009) ===
| No. overall | No. in season | Title | Directed by | Written by | Original release date | U.S. viewers (millions) |
|---|---|---|---|---|---|---|
| 110 | 1 | "Mr. Monk's Favorite Show" | Randall Zisk | Jack Bernstein | August 7, 2009 | 5.14 |
| 111 | 2 | "Mr. Monk and the Foreign Man" | David Grossman | Story by : David Breckman and Justin Brenneman; Teleplay by : David Breckman | August 14, 2009 | 5.31 |
| 112 | 3 | "Mr. Monk and the UFO" | Kevin Hooks | Michael Angeli | August 21, 2009 | 5.16 |
| 113 | 4 | "Mr. Monk Is Someone Else" | Randall Zisk | Salvatore Savo | August 28, 2009 | 4.98 |
| 114 | 5 | "Mr. Monk Takes the Stand" | Mary Lou Belli | Josh Siegal and Dylan Morgan | September 11, 2009 | 4.82 |
| 115 | 6 | "Mr. Monk and the Critic" | Jerry Levine | Hy Conrad | September 18, 2009 | 4.88 |
| 116 | 7 | "Mr. Monk and the Voodoo Curse" | Andrei Belgrader | Joe Toplyn | September 25, 2009 | 4.74 |
| 117 | 8 | "Mr. Monk Goes to Group Therapy" | Anton Cropper | Joe Ventura | October 9, 2009 | 4.37 |
| 118 | 9 | "Happy Birthday, Mr. Monk" | Tawnia McKiernan | Peter Wolk | October 16, 2009 | 3.98 |
| 119 | 10 | "Mr. Monk and Sharona" | Randall Zisk | Tom Scharpling | October 23, 2009 | 5.42 |
| 120 | 11 | "Mr. Monk and the Dog" | David Breckman | Beth Armogida | October 30, 2009 | 4.69 |
| 121 | 12 | "Mr. Monk Goes Camping" | Joe Pennella | Tom Gammill and Max Pross | November 6, 2009 | 4.26 |
| 122 | 13 | "Mr. Monk Is the Best Man" | Michael Zinberg | Joe Toplyn and Josh Siegal and Dylan Morgan | November 13, 2009 | 4.39 |
| 123 | 14 | "Mr. Monk and the Badge" | Dean Parisot | Tom Scharpling and Hy Conrad | November 20, 2009 | 5.30 |
| 124 | 15 | "Mr. Monk and the End (Part One)" | Randall Zisk | Andy Breckman | November 27, 2009 | 5.82 |
| 125 | 16 | "Mr. Monk and the End (Part Two)" | Randall Zisk | Andy Breckman | December 4, 2009 | 9.44 |

== Webisodes ==
=== Standalone webisodes ===
These four webisodes were also released on the Season 5 DVD.

- Mr. Monk and Dr. Kroger
- Mr. Monk and the Computer
- Mr. Monk and the Blood Test
- Mr. Monk Goes to the Gym

=== Little Monk ===
USA Network ordered ten episodes that would deal with the Monk brothers' childhood. The first premiered on August 21, 2009. The series starred Aaron Linker as Little Monk, Chris Lizardi as Little Ambrose and Bella Thorne as Wendy, one of the Monks' classmates. The series was directed by Randall Zisk, with Hy Conrad, Andy Breckman, Kevin Albright, and Justin Brenneman serving as writers. Aaron Linker also appeared in the parent show as Little Monk in a flashback. The episodes are available only on the "Best of Monk" DVD.

| No. | Title | Directed by | Written by | Original release date |
|---|---|---|---|---|
| 1 | "Little Monk and the Missing Bracelet" | Randall Zisk | Andy Breckman | August 21, 2009 |
A schoolmate enlists Little Monk and Ambrose to find a missing bracelet belonging to Ambrose's love interest.
| 2 | "Little Monk and the Business Boys" | Randall Zisk | Hy Conrad | August 28, 2009 |
Two schoolmates, who share a paper route, need Little Monk's assistance when their coin changer is stolen.
| 3 | "Little Monk and the New Kid" | Randall Zisk | Hy Conrad | September 11, 2009 |
When a new kid arrives at school, it looks like Little Monk and Ambrose might finally have made a friend – until their investigative skills threaten to get in the way.
| 4 | "Little Monk and the Rubber Ball" | Randall Zisk | Hy Conrad | September 18, 2009 |
Kids at school – including Ambrose's love interest – are being struck by a mysterious rubber ball, and the Monk brothers are on the case.
| 5 | "Little Monk and the Monk Cousin" | Randall Zisk | Justin Brenneman | September 25, 2009 |
A visiting cousin presents the Monk brothers with a precious discovery, but there is more to this family heirloom than meets the eye.
| 6 | "Little Monk and the Geography Bee" | Randall Zisk | Justin Brenneman | October 9, 2009 |
The school team loses the Geography Bee, and Little Monk and Ambrose suspect foul play.
| 7 | "Little Monk and the Saturday Rehearsal" | Randall Zisk | Hy Conrad | October 16, 2009 |
When money for the school talent show goes missing and two troublemakers are likely suspects, it is up to the Monk brothers to get to the bottom of things.
| 8 | "Little Monk and the Balloon" | Randall Zisk | Kevin Albright | October 23, 2009 |
Ambrose is injured when a branch on the tree he is climbing gives way, and Little Monk suspects foul play.
| 9 | "Little Monk and the Talent Show" | Randall Zisk | Justin Brenneman | October 30, 2009 |
When an unwelcome guest sneaks into the school talent show without paying, Little Monk and Ambrose attempt to prove his guilt.
| 10 | "Little Monk and the Little Trophy" | Randall Zisk | Hy Conrad | November 6, 2009 |
Ambrose wins a trophy at the talent show, and it is clear that not everyone is happy for him. However, his trophy gets stolen and tossed in the trash.

=== Post-series webisode ===
| No. | Title | Directed by | Written by | Original release date |
|---|---|---|---|---|
| 0 | "Mr. Monk Shelters in Place" | Brooke Adams | Andy Breckman | May 11, 2020 |
Set during the COVID-19 pandemic in 2020, Adrian Monk talks to his friends online through a video conference call.

== Television film ==
| No. | Title | Directed by | Written by | Original release date |
|---|---|---|---|---|
| 0 | "Mr. Monk's Last Case" | Randy Zisk | Andy Breckman | December 8, 2023 |
After losing a book deal, retired detective Adrian Monk is left feeling despondent as he is now unable to help pay for his stepdaughter Molly's wedding. The day before the wedding, her fiancé Griffin is killed while bungee jumping. Molly is convinced Griffin's death was murder and enlists Monk's help to solve the case.

== Ratings ==
Monk : U.S. viewers per episode (millions)

| Season | Episode number | | | | | | | | | | | | | | | |
| Season | 1 | 2 | 3 | 4 | 5 | 6 | 7 | 8 | 9 | 10 | 11 | 12 | 13 | 14 | 15 | 16 |
|---|---|---|---|---|---|---|---|---|---|---|---|---|---|---|---|---|
| 1 | 4.76 | 4.76 | 4.06 | 4.87 | 4.91 | 4.48 | 4.46 | 3.70 | 4.86 | TBD | TBD | TBD | 4.25 | – | | |
| 2 | 5.43 | 4.03 | 3.64 | 4.07 | 3.65 | 4.70 | 4.52 | 2.79 | 4.36 | 5.95 | 4.94 | 6.27 | 5.52 | 5.60 | 4.77 | 5.51 |
| 3 | 5.54 | 4.70 | 4.55 | 4.68 | 4.73 | 5.40 | 5.77 | 4.85 | 5.88 | 5.50 | 4.10 | 5.00 | 5.02 | 5.40 | 4.85 | 4.44 |
| 4 | 6.38 | 4.97 | 4.51 | 4.66 | 3.82 | 4.41 | 5.51 | 5.28 | 5.48 | 5.40 | 6.00 | 5.35 | 5.55 | 4.89 | 4.46 | 5.36 |
| 5 | 5.09 | 4.89 | 5.09 | 5.20 | 5.28 | 5.60 | 5.21 | 5.63 | 3.95 | TBD | 5.16 | 5.00 | 5.16 | 4.86 | 4.71 | 5.71 |
| 6 | 4.82 | 4.88 | 5.01 | 4.31 | 5.10 | 4.54 | 5.03 | 4.39 | 4.52 | 4.55 | 5.65 | 5.46 | 5.32 | 5.45 | 5.60 | 6.88 |
| 7 | 5.64 | 5.06 | 4.60 | 3.62 | 4.65 | 4.57 | 4.99 | 5.02 | 4.39 | 5.24 | 4.94 | 4.96 | 5.39 | 5.67 | 5.11 | 5.54 |
| 8 | 5.14 | 5.31 | 5.16 | 4.98 | 4.82 | 4.88 | 4.74 | 4.37 | 3.98 | 5.42 | 4.69 | 4.26 | 4.39 | 5.30 | 5.82 | 9.44 |

Audience measurement performed by Nielsen Media Research
