= Monk season 6 =

Monk
- Season 6
- DVD cover
- Starring: Tony Shalhoub Traylor Howard Ted Levine Jason Gray-Stanford
- No. of episodes: 16

Release
- Original network: USA Network
- Original release: July 13, 2007 – February 22, 2008

Season chronology
- ← Previous; Season 5 Next → Season 7

The sixth season of Monk originally aired in the United States on USA Network from July 13, 2007, to February 22, 2008. It consisted of 16 episodes. Tony Shalhoub, Traylor Howard, Ted Levine, and Jason Gray-Stanford reprised their roles as the main characters. A DVD of the season was released on July 8, 2008.

== Crew ==
Andy Breckman continued his tenure as show runner. Executive producers for the season included Breckman, David Hoberman, series star Tony Shalhoub, writer Tom Scharpling, and Rob Thompson. NBC Universal Television Studio was the primary production company backing the show. Randy Newman's theme ("It's a Jungle Out There") was continued to be used, while Jeff Beal's original instrumental theme could be heard in some episodes. Directors for the season included Randall Zisk, Michael W. Watkins, David Breckman, and Andrei Belgrader. Writers for the season included Andy Breckman, David Breckman, Jonathan Collier, Hy Conrad, Daniel Dratch, Tom Gammill, Dylan Morgan, Max Pross, Salvatore Savo, Josh Siegal, Joe Toplyn, Tom Scharpling, and Peter Wolk.

== Cast ==
All four main characters returned for the sixth season: Tony Shalhoub as former homicide detective Adrian Monk, Traylor Howard as Monk's faithful assistant Natalie Teeger, Ted Levine as SFPD captain Leland Stottlemeyer, and Jason Gray-Stanford as Lieutenant Randy Disher.

Stanley Kamel returned for his final season as Monk's psychiatrist, Dr. Charles Kroger. After Kamel's death during the hiatus following the sixth season, writers for the seventh season chose to have the character also die of a heart attack. Emmy Clarke continued to portray Natalie's daughter, Julie Teeger, and Sharon Lawrence completed her run as Stottlemeyer's girlfriend, Linda Fusco. Melora Hardin portrayed Trudy Monk, Monk's deceased wife. Ray Porter took over the role of Dale the Whale, a part formerly held by Adam Arkin and Tim Curry. Sarah Silverman returned as Monk's number-one fan and founder of the Monk-o-Philes, Marci Maven, after a three season hiatus. Silverman earned an Emmy nomination for this role. Tim Bagley reprised his role as Harold Krenshaw, Monk's number-one rival. Cody McMains also returned for a second appearance as Troy Kroger, Dr. Kroger's teenage son. Larry Miller made a second appearance as Garrett Price, Monk's lawyer, since his first appearance in season 3. Gail O'Grady appeared a second time since the pilot episode, "Mr. Monk and the Candidate", but as a different character, Lovely Rita.

== Episodes ==
No. overall	No. in season	Title	Directed by	Written by	Original release date	U.S. viewers (millions)
78	1	"Mr. Monk and His Biggest Fan"	Randall Zisk	Andy Breckman	July 13, 2007	4.82
Monk's obsessed fan Marci Maven (Sarah Silverman) finds herself in trouble when her pet dog is accused of mauling and killing a neighbor, even though the dog died three days before the alleged attack. In desperation, she turns to Monk for answers.
79	2	"Mr. Monk and the Rapper"	Paris Barclay	Daniel Dratch	July 20, 2007	4.88
When a rapper is killed by a car bomb, Monk is hired to clear the name of the dead man's rival Murderuss (Snoop Dogg), against whom there is a mountain of evidence. Monk gets booed off the stage when he tries to deliver his "Here's what happened" monologue, so Murderuss delivers it in rap form. Snoop Dogg also recorded a cover version of the theme song.
80	3	"Mr. Monk and the Naked Man"	Randall Zisk	Tom Gammill and Max Pross	July 27, 2007	5.01
Monk must confront his prejudice against nudists (including Diedrich Bader) when he is called to investigate the murder of a woman on a nude beach. Along the way, he must investigate a computer magnate the victim was trying to talk to (Alfred Molina) and her roommate (Angela Kinsey).
81	4	"Mr. Monk and the Bad Girlfriend"	Wendey Stanzler	Joe Toplyn	August 3, 2007	4.31
Monk's friendship with Stottlemeyer is tested when he and Natalie believe the captain's girlfriend Linda Fusco (Sharon Lawrence) murdered her business partner when he decided to leave her and start his own company—even though she had a webchat with the three twenty minutes before the murder, from her home, too far from the scene of the crime.
82	5	"Mr. Monk and the Birds and the Bees"	Michael W. Watkins	Peter Wolk	August 10, 2007	5.10
Monk plays Cupid and detective at the same time, helping Julie out with dating issues surrounding herself and her boyfriend (Matt Lanter) while investigating a sports agent (Vincent Ventresca) that he believes shot his wife and then staged to make it look like she was shot by a burglar who himself was also murdered as part of the coverup.
83	6	"Mr. Monk and the Buried Treasure"	Sam Weisman	Jonathan Collier	August 17, 2007	4.54
Monk finds himself in a dangerous situation when he helps Dr. Kroger's son Troy (Cody McMains) follow a treasure map, which turns out to be related to a major bank robbery.
84	7	"Mr. Monk and the Daredevil"	Jonathan Collier	Alan Zweibel	August 24, 2007	5.03
While Monk is investigating an incident in the woods in which someone has torched the car of a driver who has died in an accident, a famous daredevil previously only known as the Frisco Fly falls while scaling a tall building, and is revealed to be none other than Monk's rival patient Harold Krenshaw (Tim Bagley), turning Monk's world upside-down. It's up to Monk to find out the connection between the two incidents before someone is killed. Guest stars David Koechner.
85	8	"Mr. Monk and the Wrong Man"	Anton Cropper	Salvatore Savo	September 7, 2007	4.39
When an ex-convict (Tim DeZarn) Monk sent to prison years earlier for a double torture-murder home invasion is cleared by new DNA evidence, Monk helps him rebuild his life, while trying to correct his previous mistake.
86	9	"Mr. Monk Is Up All Night"	Randall Zisk	David Breckman	September 14, 2007	4.52
When Monk suffers from insomnia, he ventures into the night and stumbles upon an apparent murder.
87	10	"Mr. Monk and the Man Who Shot Santa Claus"	Randall Zisk	Daniel Schofield and Ben Gruber	December 7, 2007	4.55
When Monk shoots and wounds a retired parole officer (Randle Mell) dressed as Santa Claus in what he claims is self-defense, he quickly becomes a social pariah. Also guest stars Larry Miller.
88	11	"Mr. Monk Joins a Cult"	Anton Cropper	Josh Siegal and Dylan Morgan	January 11, 2008	5.65
While investigating the ritual murder of a woman at a highway rest stop, Monk joins a cult, and falls under the spell of its charismatic leader (Howie Mandel).
89	12	"Mr. Monk Goes to the Bank"	Michael W. Watkins	Hy Conrad	January 18, 2008	5.46
When the safety deposit box holding one of Monk's treasured possessions is robbed, Monk will do whatever it takes to solve the case, even going undercover as a guard at his bank. Guest stars Dan Castellaneta.
90	13	"Mr. Monk and the Three Julies"	David Breckman	Tom Scharpling and Joe Toplyn	January 25, 2008	5.32
It is Natalie's turn to be concerned when two women sharing the same name as her daughter are killed on the same day through completely different M.O.s, while her Julie is preparing for her driver's test. Guest stars John Hawkes.
91	14	"Mr. Monk Paints His Masterpiece"	Andrei Belgrader	Jon Wurster	February 1, 2008	5.45
While investigating two murders at a roadside junk shop, Monk takes up a new hobby – painting – and meets with unexpected success with a mysterious Russian art collector (Peter Stormare). Also guest stars Victoria Tennant. Final appearance of Stanley Kamel as Dr. Charles Kroger.
92	15	"Mr. Monk Is on the Run (Part One)"	Randall Zisk	Tom Scharpling	February 15, 2008	5.60
When Monk is arrested for murdering a man (Courtney Gains) with six fingers on his right hand, he escapes the custody of a small-town sheriff (Scott Glenn) and becomes a fugitive on the run.
93	16	"Mr. Monk Is on the Run (Part Two)"	Randall Zisk	Hy Conrad and Daniel Dratch	February 22, 2008	6.88
While everyone mourns Monk's "death", Monk goes into hiding to find the proof that will clear his name. He is led to a vast conspiracy involving the sheriff (Scott Glenn) who framed him, the lieutenant governor, and even Dale "The Whale" Biederbeck (Ray Porter).

== Awards and nominations ==
=== Emmy Awards ===
- Outstanding Actor – Comedy Series (Tony Shalhoub, nominated)
- Outstanding Guest Actress – Comedy Series (Sarah Silverman for playing "Marci Maven" in "Mr. Monk and His Biggest Fan", nominated)

=== Screen Actors Guild ===
- Outstanding Actor – Comedy Series (Tony Shalhoub, nominated)
