= Monk season 4 =

Monk
- Season 4
- DVD cover
- Starring: Tony Shalhoub Traylor Howard Ted Levine Jason Gray-Stanford
- No. of episodes: 16

Release
- Original network: USA Network
- Original release: July 8, 2005 – March 17, 2006

Season chronology
- ← Previous; Season 3 Next → Season 5

The fourth season of Monk originally aired in the United States on USA Network from July 8, 2005, to March 17, 2006. It consisted of 16 episodes. Tony Shalhoub, Traylor Howard, Ted Levine, and Jason Gray-Stanford reprised their roles as the main characters. A DVD of the season was released on June 27, 2006.

== Crew ==
Andy Breckman continued his tenure as show runner. Executive producers for the season included Breckman, David Hoberman, and series star Tony Shalhoub. NBC Universal Television Studio was the primary production company backing the show. Randy Newman's theme ("It's a Jungle Out There") continued to be used, while Jeff Beal's original instrumental theme could be heard in some episodes. Directors for the season included Randall Zisk, Jerry Levine, and Andrei Belgrader. Writers for the season included Andy Breckman, David Breckman, Hy Conrad, Daniel Dratch, Joe Toplyn, and Tom Scharpling.

During the airing of this season, writer Lee Goldberg published his first Monk mystery novel, Mr. Monk Goes to the Firehouse.

== Cast ==
All four primary cast members from the end of the season three returned. This included Tony Shalhoub as Adrian Monk, the OCD "defective detective," Traylor Howard as Natalie Teeger, his assistant, Ted Levine as Captain Leland Stottlemeyer of the SFPD Robbery and Homicide Division, and Jason Gray-Stanford as Lieutenant Randy Disher. The character of Dr. Charles Kroger, Monk's ever-needed psychiatrist, was reprised by Stanley Kamel in five episodes, a number surpassed only by Emmy Clarke as Julie Teeger, Natalie's daughter, who appeared in seven. Melora Hardin continued to play Trudy Monk, Monk's deceased wife, and John Turturro returned as Ambrose Monk, Monk's agoraphobic brother, after a one-season absence. Jarrad Paul portrayed Monk's annoying upstairs neighbor, Kevin Dorfman. Michael Cavanaugh and Holland Taylor made their first appearance as Bob and Peggy Davenport (Natalie's ultra-rich parents), and Glenne Headly (Karen Stottlemeyer) made her exit from the series, after her character divorced the captain.

== Episodes ==
No. overall	No. in season	Title	Directed by	Written by	Original release date	U.S. viewers (millions)
46	1	"Mr. Monk and the Other Detective"	Eric Laneuville	Hy Conrad	July 8, 2005	6.38
A jewelry store manager goes missing and a security guard is killed in an apparent robbery. When small-time private detective Marty Eels (Jason Alexander) shows up at the scene to offer a series of remarkably accurate insights – including the whereabouts of the manager – Monk becomes determined to expose him as a fraud. Also guest stars Dana Ivey.
47	2	"Mr. Monk Goes Home Again"	Randall Zisk	Tom Scharpling	July 15, 2005	4.97
While investigating the murder of an armored car driver in a supermarket parking lot just before Halloween, Monk gets a call from Ambrose (John Turturro) telling him that their long-lost father is coming home. As the brothers, Natalie, and Julie spend an uneasy night waiting for him, they run across a trick-or-treater whose habit of stealing candy intrigues Monk.
48	3	"Mr. Monk Stays in Bed"	Philip Casnoff	Hy Conrad	July 22, 2005	4.51
Natalie finds a pizza delivery man beaten to death in his own car, but the investigation into his murder is sidetracked by the disappearance of a superior court judge. Natalie probes the first case as the police work on the second, with Monk increasingly drawn into both of them as he tries to recover from the flu at home.
49	4	"Mr. Monk Goes to the Office"	Jerry Levine	Nell Scovell	July 29, 2005	4.66
Monk looks into a double attack at a parking garage that has left an attendant dead and a stock analyst's hand broken. As Monk goes undercover at the analyst's firm to investigate the case, he finds himself dealing with suspicions of insider trading, an inter-office bowling rivalry, the murder of an interior decorator, and the fact that his coworkers actually like him. Guest stars Eddie McClintock.
50	5	"Mr. Monk Gets Drunk"	Andrei Belgrader	Daniel Dratch	August 5, 2005	3.82
While Monk and Natalie are visiting a winery for the weekend to commemorate his honeymoon with Trudy, he makes the acquaintance of a man (Daniel Roebuck) who seems to disappear from the grounds overnight. None of the guests and staff claim to have seen him, and Monk becomes determined to uncover the truth when a contract killer (Paul Ben-Victor) arrives looking for the man. Also guest stars Felicia Day, Chris D'Elia, and Richard Libertini.
51	6	"Mr. Monk and Mrs. Monk"	Randall Zisk	David Breckman	August 12, 2005	4.41
As Monk starts to make progress in dealing with the death of his wife Trudy (Melora Hardin), Natalie encounters a woman who looks exactly like her. The evidence mounts that Trudy may have faked her murder and been involved in the death of an old man (Harve Presnell), whose daughter worked with her on a news story that sent a union boss to prison. Also stars Kevin Kilner and Jarrad Paul as Kevin Dorfman.
52	7	"Mr. Monk Goes to a Wedding"	Anthony R. Palmieri	Liz Sagal	August 19, 2005	5.51
Accompanying Natalie to the wedding of her brother Jonathan (Rob Benedict), Disher is struck by a car in the parking lot of the hotel where it is being held. While Natalie tries to reconcile with her parents (Michael Cavanaugh and Holland Taylor), Monk and Stottlemeyer struggle to figure out if someone in the wedding party is responsible for both this attack and the murder of the event photographer, found dead in a spa mud bath. Also stars Ashley Williams.
53	8	"Mr. Monk and Little Monk"	Robert Singer	Joe Toplyn	August 26, 2005	5.28
One of Monk's eighth-grade classmates, on whom he had a crush, comes to him for help in solving a break-in that resulted in the death of her housekeeper. As Monk tries to win her affections and searches for clues to explain a defaced painting found at the crime scene, he remembers his efforts to clear her name in a theft of school bake sale money over 30 years earlier. Grant Rosenmeyer plays Monk's younger self.
54	9	"Mr. Monk and the Secret Santa"	Jerry Levine	David Breckman	December 2, 2005	5.48
During the SFPD Christmas party, a detective dies after drinking from a poisoned bottle of port intended for Stottlemeyer. The captain recruits Monk and Natalie to determine whether the brother of a bank robber he killed is out for revenge, and Monk has to go undercover as a shopping mall Santa in order to get to the truth. Guest stars Rachael Harris.
55	10	"Mr. Monk Goes to a Fashion Show"	Randall Zisk	Jonathan Collier	January 13, 2006	5.40
A garment factory worker begs Monk to prove the innocence of her son, who is in jail awaiting trial for the murder of a fashion model. The evidence against the young man is overwhelming, but Monk begins to question it as he investigates a short-tempered designer (Malcolm McDowell) and the victim's roommate (Mini Andén), the latter of whom soon turns up dead as well. Also guest stars Scott Adsit.
56	11	"Mr. Monk Bumps His Head"	Stephen Surjik	Andy Breckman	January 20, 2006	6.00
While pursuing a lead on Trudy's murder, Monk is robbed, knocked unconscious, and dumped on a truck heading out of San Francisco. Waking up with amnesia in a small Wyoming town, he is taken in by a lonely woman (Laurie Metcalf) who claims to be his wife and finds himself unable to resist investigating the sudden disappearance of a diner waitress. Also guest stars Charles Napier and Michael Shalhoub.
57	12	"Mr. Monk and the Captain's Marriage"	Philip Casnoff	Jack Bernstein	January 27, 2006	5.35
Stottlemeyer's worry that his marriage to Karen is falling apart threatens to derail the SFPD's investigation into the murder of a drug dealer. The captain is sent to anger management class after punching an officer who claims to have slept with her, leaving Disher, Monk, and Natalie to work the case with help from a homeless man who witnessed the crime. Final appearance of Glenne Headly as Karen Stottlemeyer.
58	13	"Mr. Monk and the Big Reward"	Randall Zisk	Tom Scharpling and Daniel Dratch	February 3, 2006	5.55
When a priceless diamond is stolen from a museum, Monk and Natalie find themselves competing against three private detectives (DJ Qualls, Derrick O'Connor, and Tyler Mane) to find it and claim a $1 million reward. As the case leads them to a meditation center where they discover a prime suspect dead, Disher finds himself dealing with a woman who repeatedly comes to the precinct to confess to trivial crimes.
59	14	"Mr. Monk and the Astronaut"	Randall Zisk	David Breckman and Joe Toplyn	March 3, 2006	4.89
A former showgirl is found dead of an apparent suicide shortly before her tell-all memoir is to be published, but Monk suspects one of her past lovers, a famous astronaut (Jeffrey Donovan), of murdering her. To prove it, though, he must break the man's unassailable alibi that he was orbiting the Earth at the time, and also figure out a connection to a mail-stealing neighbor whose garage door opener has gone haywire.
60	15	"Mr. Monk Goes to the Dentist"	Jefery Levy	Story by : Daniel Dratch and Joe Toplyn; Teleplay by : David Breckman and Tom Scharpling	March 10, 2006	4.46
While under sedation during a dental appointment, Disher thinks he sees the dentist (Jon Favreau) and his assistant (Brooke Langton) kill an intruder in an argument over Barry Bonds. He quits the SFPD in frustration after the intruder turns up dead and no one takes him seriously, but Monk and Stottlemeyer find evidence linking the man to an armored car robbery and double homicide and start to believe Disher's claim.
61	16	"Mr. Monk Gets Jury Duty"	Andrei Belgrader	Peter Wolk	March 17, 2006	5.36
While Monk is serving on a jury during a robbery trial, the SFPD must handle the extradition of a fugitive wanted on federal drug trafficking charges. Monk's suspicion of a body being hidden in a dumpster outside the courthouse is proven correct, and he begins to connect this murder to both his trial and the fugitive's impending handover to federal authorities. Guest stars Emmanuelle Vaugier and Wings Hauser.

== Awards and nominations ==
=== Emmy Awards ===
- Outstanding Actor – Comedy Series (Tony Shalhoub for "Mr. Monk Bumps His Head", won)
- Outstanding Guest Actress – Comedy Series (Laurie Metcalf for playing "Cora" in "Mr. Monk Bumps His Head", nominated)
