= Monk season 5 =

Season of television series

Monk
- Season 5
- DVD cover
- Starring: Tony Shalhoub Traylor Howard Ted Levine Jason Gray-Stanford
- No. of episodes: 16

Release
- Original network: USA Network
- Original release: July 7, 2006 – March 2, 2007

Season chronology
- ← Previous; Season 4 Next → Season 6

The fifth season of Monk originally aired in the United States on USA Network from July 7, 2006, to March 2, 2007. It consisted of 16 episodes. Tony Shalhoub, Traylor Howard, Ted Levine, and Jason Gray-Stanford reprised their roles as the main characters. A DVD of the season was released on June 26, 2007.

== Crew ==
Andy Breckman continued his tenure as show runner. Executive producers for the season included Breckman, David Hoberman, series star Tony Shalhoub, and writer Tom Scharpling. NBC Universal Television Studio was the primary production company backing the show. Randy Newman's theme ("It's a Jungle Out There") continued to be used, while Jeff Beal's original instrumental theme could be heard in some episodes. Directors for the season included Randall Zisk, Jerry Levine, Peter Weller, and Andrei Belgrader. Writers for the season included Andy Breckman, David Breckman, Jonathan Collier, Hy Conrad, Daniel Dratch, Lee Goldberg, Dylan Morgan, William Rabkin, Josh Siegal, Joe Toplyn, and Tom Scharpling.

== Cast ==
All four main characters returned for the fifth season. Tony Shalhoub returned as former homicide detective Adrian Monk, with Traylor Howard returning as Monk's faithful assistant, Natalie Teeger. Ted Levine returned as the SFPD captain, Leland Stottlemeyer, and Jason Gray-Stanford reprised his role as the lovable but oblivious Lieutenant Randy Disher.

Stanley Kamel returned as Monk's psychiatrist, Dr. Charles Kroger. Emmy Clarke portrayed Julie Teeger, Natalie's daughter, in a third season. Melora Hardin continued to portray Trudy Monk, Monk's deceased wife (whose murder is the series' main story arc), while Lindy Newton played a younger version of the character. Tim Bagley returned to play Harold Krenshaw, Monk's main rival, after a one-season absence. The character of Monk's annoying upstairs neighbor, Kevin Dorfman, was brought back, portrayed by Jarrad Paul. Cody McMains starred, for the first time, as Dr. Kroger's son, Troy Kroger. Michael Cavanaugh and Holland Taylor returned for the final time as Natalie's ultra-rich parents, Bob and Peggy Davenport, and Sharon Lawrence made her debut on the series as Stottlemeyer's girlfriend, Linda Fusco. Additionally, several non-recurring guest stars made appearances, including Brooke Adams (Shalhoub's wife, playing her third different character), Joshua Alba, Sean Astin, Catherine Bach, Graham Beckel, Paul Blackthorne, Stephen Bogardus, Ivar Brogger, Sarah Brown, Dan Butler, Ricardo Chavira, Gordon Clapp, Alex Cohen, Alice Cooper, David DeLuise, Charles Durning, Art Evans, Tom Everett, Kevin Farley, Tamara Feldman, John Furey, Deborah Geffner, Greg Grunberg, Dan Hedaya, Brad Hunt, Jamie Kaler, Brian Kerwin, Jennifer Lawrence, James Logan, Chi McBride, Brian McNamara, Jacob Miller, Silas Weir Mitchell, Sandra Nelson, Lawrence O'Donnell, Jim Piddock, Andy Richter, Bryce Robinson, Kiernan Shipka, Peter James Smith, Cynthia Stevenson, Heather Tom, Stanley Tucci (in an Emmy award-winning performance), Reginald VelJohnson, Steven Weber, Frederick Weller, Peter Weller, Chris Williams, Danny Woodburn, and Odette Yustman.

== Episodes ==
No. overall	No. in season	Title	Directed by	Written by	Original release date	U.S. viewers (millions)
62	1	"Mr. Monk and the Actor"	Randall Zisk	Hy Conrad and Joe Toplyn	July 7, 2006	5.09
The police find themselves dealing with a pair of seemingly unrelated homicides: a woman in SHL found dead of a head injury in her own apartment, and the shooting death of a pawnbroker during a robbery at his shop. The investigation is complicated by the presence of a renowned actor (Stanley Tucci) who is to portray Monk in a TV movie adaptation of one of his past cases – and who has a habit of losing himself in his roles as he prepares for them. Cameo appearance by Peter Weller.
63	2	"Mr. Monk and the Garbage Strike"	Jerry Levine	Andy Breckman and Daniel Gaeta	July 14, 2006	4.89
A sanitation union boss is found dead in his office during a citywide garbage strike. Although Monk wants to call the case a suicide so the union will go back to work, Natalie persuades him to follow the evidence and investigate it as a murder, prolonging the strike and putting the mayor (Chi McBride) at risk of being indicted. Guest appearances by David DeLuise and Alice Cooper.
64	3	"Mr. Monk and the Big Game"	Chris Long	Jack Bernstein	July 21, 2006	5.09
The coach of Julie's high school basketball team is fatally electrocuted just before the league championship game. Julie and her friends persuade Monk to investigate, convinced that the death was not accidental, and he uncovers links to a recent wildfire and a cold case of a young girl's murder while "helping" Natalie coach the team. Jennifer Lawrence appears briefly as a mascot in one of her earliest television roles. Guest starring Jim O'Heir.
65	4	"Mr. Monk Can't See a Thing"	Stephen Surjik	Lee Goldberg and William Rabkin	July 28, 2006	5.20
While having his smoke detectors tested at the firehouse, Monk witnesses the bludgeoning death of a firefighter and is then blinded when the killer throws cleaning solvent in his face. As Monk struggles to cope with the possibility that he may never see again, Stottlemeyer persuades him to help investigate as best he can, and he soon discovers that the firehouse attack may be connected to the death of a construction company secretary in a recent house fire.
66	5	"Mr. Monk, Private Eye"	Peter Weller	Tom Scharpling and Daniel Gaeta	August 4, 2006	5.28
Inspired by her grandfather's success in the toothpaste industry, Natalie persuades a reluctant Monk to open his own private detective agency. His first client, realtor Linda Fusco (Sharon Lawrence), wants him to find out who hit her car in a parking lot, but the accident leads him to a woman's disappearance that the police are investigating and a doctor (Fred Weller) who may be connected to it.
67	6	"Mr. Monk and the Class Reunion"	David Grossman	Daniel Dratch	August 11, 2006	5.60
Just before Monk's 25-year college reunion at UC Berkeley, a retired nurse is found dead in an apparent fall down a flight of stairs. The weekend brings back bittersweet memories for Monk as he, Stottlemeyer, and Disher investigate the death and gradually connect it to a plot against Trudy's roommate (Cynthia Stevenson). Also guest stars Brian McNamara.
68	7	"Mr. Monk Gets a New Shrink"	Andrei Belgrader	Hy Conrad	August 18, 2006	5.21
The stabbing death of a cleaning woman in Dr. Kroger's office prompts him to retire, since he thinks one of his patients may be responsible. In addition to solving the case, Monk has to deal with the pressures of getting Dr. Kroger to return to practice, finding a new psychiatrist, and fending off rival Harold Krenshaw. Guest starring Gordon Clapp, and Kiernan Shipka in one of her earliest television roles.
69	8	"Mr. Monk Goes to a Rock Concert"	Randall Zisk	Blair Singer	August 25, 2006	5.63
Monk and Natalie go to a major rock concert (as far outside Monk's comfort zone as he could possibly get) in search of Captain Stottlemeyer's runaway son Jared (Jon Kyle Hansen), but get sidetracked when a roadie (Terry Fradet) turns up dead of an apparent drug overdose in one of the port-a-potties, and are subsequently roped-in to investigating by the victim's girlfriend (Tamara Feldman).
70	9	"Mr. Monk Meets His Dad"	Jerry Levine	Tom Scharpling and Daniel Dratch	November 17, 2006	3.95
When Monk's truck driving father Jack (Dan Hedaya) rolls into town at Christmas time, Monk joins him on the road, where they stumble across a very peculiar mystery after Jack's boss is killed. Also guest stars Brian Kerwin.
71	10	"Mr. Monk and the Leper"	Randall Zisk	Charles Evered and Joe Karter	December 22, 2006	N/A
A missing billionaire suffering from leprosy (Stephen Bogardus) comes out of hiding to hire Monk, who soon finds himself in the midst of a shadowy murder plot worthy of a classic Hollywood film noir. The investigation leads Monk and Natalie to the man's wife (Sarah Brown), who originally has a difficult time believing their story. The episode was broadcast in black & white as well as in color.
72	11	"Mr. Monk Makes a Friend"	Randall Zisk	Andy Breckman and Daniel Gaeta	January 19, 2007	5.16
A fun-loving, FPSL-enjoyer everyman (Andy Richter) bumps into Monk, and the two become fast friends. For the first time in his life, Monk appears to have a buddy. But is this everyman hiding a dark secret?
73	12	"Mr. Monk Is At Your Service"	Anton Cropper	Rob LaZebnik	January 26, 2007	5.00
When Natalie suspects foul play in the deaths of her parents’ (Michael Cavanaugh and Holland Taylor) wealthy neighbors, Monk goes undercover as a butler to the deceased's son (Sean Astin) to investigate, but he soon finds himself more obsessed with his job than with investigating. Also guest stars Ashley Johnson.
74	13	"Mr. Monk Is On the Air"	Mike Listo	Josh Siegal and Dylan Morgan	February 2, 2007	5.16
Monk and Natalie suspect that a popular radio shock jock (Steven Weber) has murdered his wife. There's only one problem: at the time of death, he was on the air broadcasting a live show. Also guest stars Danny Woodburn.
75	14	"Mr. Monk Visits a Farm"	Andrei Belgrader	David Breckman	February 9, 2007	4.86
When Randy's uncle Harvey apparently dies by his own hand after accidentally killing his beloved prize pig, and leaves his farm to Randy in his will, Randy decides to quit the police force and start a new life in the country. But Randy soon suspects that his neighbor (Ricardo Chavira) may have murdered Harvey, so Monk joins him on the farm to investigate. Along the way Monk must also woo the local sheriff (Brooke Adams) and go undercover as a farmhand to investigate Randy's neighbor. Also guest stars James Gammon.
76	15	"Mr. Monk and the Really, Really Dead Guy"	Anthony R. Palmieri and Draco Savage	Joe Toplyn	February 23, 2007	4.71
When the mysterious "Six Way Killer" strikes in San Francisco, Monk must match his detective skills against the flashy forensic technology of a federal agent as they both pursue the murderer.
77	16	"Mr. Monk Goes to the Hospital"	Wendey Stanzler	Jonathan Collier	March 2, 2007	5.71
Monk goes to the emergency room for a bloody nose, but when a doctor in the hospital turns up dead, Monk joins the murder investigation, and soon his own life is in grave danger. Guest stars Charles Durning and Dan Butler.

== Awards and nominations ==
=== Emmy Awards ===
- Outstanding Actor – Comedy Series (Tony Shalhoub, nominated)
- Outstanding Guest Actor – Comedy Series (Stanley Tucci for playing "David Ruskin" in "Mr. Monk and the Actor", won)

=== Golden Globe Awards ===
- Best Actor – Musical or Comedy Series (Tony Shalhoub, nominated)

=== Screen Actors Guild ===
- Outstanding Actor – Comedy Series (Tony Shalhoub, nominated)
