= Monk season 3 =

Monk
- Season 3
- DVD cover
- Starring: Tony Shalhoub Bitty Schram Ted Levine Jason Gray-Stanford Traylor Howard
- No. of episodes: 16

Release
- Original network: USA Network
- Original release: June 18, 2004 – March 4, 2005

Season chronology
- ← Previous; Season 2 Next → Season 4

The third season of Monk originally aired in the United States on USA Network from June 18, 2004, to March 4, 2005. It consists of 16 episodes. Tony Shalhoub, Ted Levine, and Jason Gray-Stanford reprise their roles as the main characters, and Traylor Howard joins the cast. Bitty Schram left the show due to a contract dispute during the Winter hiatus. A DVD of the season was released on July 5, 2005.

== Crew ==
Andy Breckman continued his tenure as show runner. Executive producers for the season include Breckman and David Hoberman. NBC Universal Television Studio was the primary production company backing the show. Randy Newman's theme ("It's a Jungle Out There") continued to be used, while Jeff Beal's original instrumental theme can be heard in some episodes. Directors for the season include Randall Zisk, Jerry Levine, Michael Zinberg, and Andrei Belgrader. Zisk received an Emmy award-nomination for his work on "Mr. Monk Takes His Medicine." Writers for the season included Andy Breckman, David Breckman, Lee Goldberg, William Rabkin, Joe Toplyn, Daniel Dratch, Hy Conrad, and Tom Scharpling.

== Cast ==
Tony Shalhoub returned as the titular character and OCD detective, Adrian Monk. Ted Levine and Jason Gray-Stanford reprised their roles as Captain Leland Stottlemeyer and Lieutenant Randy Disher, respectively. Bitty Schram portrayed Monk's nurse, Sharona Fleming, for the first half of the season, but left due to a contract dispute. Traylor Howard was then cast as Natalie Teeger in a main role as Monk's new assistant. Andy Breckman, the show's creator, stated, "I will always be grateful to Traylor because she came in when the show was in crisis and saved our baby [....] We had to make a hurried replacement, and not every show survives that. I was scared to death."

Stanley Kamel reprised his role as Monk's psychiatrist, Dr. Charles Kroger, in nine episodes, while Kane Ritchotte continued to play Benjy Fleming, Sharona's son. Emmy Clarke entered the series as Julie Teeger (Natalie's daughter), and Melora Hardin returned as Monk's beloved deceased wife, Trudy Monk. Tim Bagley made his first two appearances as Harold Krenshaw, Monk's main rival. Jarrad Paul portrays Kevin Dorfman, Monk's annoying upstairs neighbor, while Glenne Headly continues to portray Karen Stottlemeyer, the captain's wife.

== Episodes ==
No. overall	No. in season	Title	Directed by	Written by	Original release date	U.S. viewers (millions)
30	1	"Mr. Monk Takes Manhattan"	Randall Zisk	Andy Breckman	June 18, 2004	5.54
Monk, Sharona, Stottlemeyer, and Disher fly to New York in order to pursue a lead in Trudy's murder. They are sidetracked into helping the NYPD solve the shooting death of a foreign ambassador in a hotel elevator and a woman's mugging in Central Park, with Monk briefly getting lost in the city as he ponders the importance of a wet overcoat. Once the cases are solved, he meets with Warrick Tennyson (Frank Collison), who admits that he was paid to build the bomb that killed Trudy by a man with six fingers on one hand. Guest stars Mykelti Williamson, Jeffrey Dean Morgan, and Olek Krupa.
31	2	"Mr. Monk and the Panic Room"	Jerry Levine	David Breckman and Joe Toplyn	June 25, 2004	4.70
A music producer (Stewart Finlay-McLennan) is found shot to death in the locked panic room of his own mansion, and his pet chimpanzee is caught holding the murder weapon. Sharona steals the animal from police custody to keep it from being euthanized and stashes it at Monk's house, driving him to distraction as he tries to work out how the victim's wife (Carmen Electra) might be involved.
32	3	"Mr. Monk and the Blackout"	Michael Zinberg	Daniel Dratch and Hy Conrad	July 9, 2004	4.55
A bombing at a power plant leads to a citywide blackout in which three people die, and the prime suspect is an activist who has apparently been dead for nine years. The case is further complicated by a second bombing and blackout, the death of a protester (Judge Reinhold) at a construction site, and a power company spokeswoman (Alicia Coppola) who takes a romantic interest in Monk.
33	4	"Mr. Monk Gets Fired"	Andrei Belgrader	Peter Wolk	July 16, 2004	4.68
When Monk's investigation into identifying a severed torso leads to him accidentally deleting some important case files, the new police commissioner (Saverio Guerra) revokes his private detective license and fires him from his consultant's position with the SFPD. Monk is devastated, but still cannot resist trying to find the connection between the torso, a case of arson at a wig shop, and two attempts to steal the commissioner's hat. Also guest stars Glenne Headly and Scott Adsit.
34	5	"Mr. Monk Meets the Godfather"	Michael Zinberg	Lee Goldberg and William Rabkin	July 23, 2004	4.73
A mob boss's nephew is killed in a shooting at a barbershop, prompting him to turn to Monk for help in finding the culprit. Reluctantly taking the case at the behest of an FBI agent (Rick Hoffman), Monk is drawn into a brewing mob war and must figure out how a missing gumball machine and a report of valuable coins missing from the United States Mint tie into the crime. Guest stars Philip Baker Hall.
35	6	"Mr. Monk and the Girl Who Cried Wolf"	Jerry Levine	Hy Conrad	July 30, 2004	5.40
Plagued by repeated visions of a man with a bloody knife in his chest and a screwdriver jammed in his ear, Sharona begins to think she is having a mental breakdown. She takes some time off and hires a temporary replacement (Niecy Nash) who quickly grates on Monk's nerves, but all three are soon drawn back together when a man is murdered in a fashion based on a story Sharona has written. Also guest stars Emma Caulfield.
36	7	"Mr. Monk and the Employee of the Month"	Scott Foley	Ross Abrash	August 6, 2004	5.77
When the longtime Employee of the Month at a local department store dies, Monk's former partner (Enrico Colantoni) – fired from the SFPD for allegedly stealing drugs from the evidence room and now in charge of store security – calls him in to determine if the death was a murder. Monk starts working at the store in order to figure out whether and why any of the other employees may have wanted the victim dead. Also guest stars Alanna Ubach.
37	8	"Mr. Monk and the Game Show"	Randall Zisk	Daniel Dratch	August 13, 2004	4.85
While Sharona is out of town, Trudy's father Dwight (Bob Gunton) invites Monk and Kevin Dorfman (Jarrad Paul) to Los Angeles to look into his suspicions of cheating on a game show that he produces. The trip revives Monk's bittersweet memories of Trudy as he ponders the apparently accidental death of the assistant to the show's host (John Michael Higgins) and unearths evidence of blackmail and murder. Also guest stars Larry Brandenburg. Tony Shalhoub is the only main cast member to appear in this episode, as the others were involved in contract disputes at the time.
38	9	"Mr. Monk Takes His Medicine"	Randall Zisk	Story by : Tom Scharpling and Chuck Sklar; Teleplay by : Tom Scharpling	August 20, 2004	5.88
The SFPD launches a citywide manhunt after Stottlemeyer is shot and wounded on the job with a gun belonging to a woman who has just committed suicide. Feeling overwhelmed by his OCD, Monk starts taking a new medication to control his symptoms, but it causes a drastic personality change and hinders his ability to find a connection between the two incidents. Guest stars Ken Marino. Final regular-series appearance of Bitty Schram as Sharona Fleming.
39	10	"Mr. Monk and the Red Herring"	Randall Zisk	Andy Breckman	January 21, 2005	5.50
Now that Sharona has moved back to New Jersey and remarried her ex-husband, Monk needs to find a new assistant. He discovers that bartender Natalie Teeger might be perfect for the job, but must first figure out why two men who recently broke into her house – one of whom she killed in self-defense – were trying to steal her daughter Julie's pet fish. First appearance of Traylor Howard as Natalie Teeger.
40	11	"Mr. Monk vs. the Cobra"	Anthony R. Palmieri	Joe Toplyn	January 28, 2005	4.10
The author (Harry Groener) of an unflattering book about a martial arts movie star is murdered in his own home, and evidence at the scene seems to implicate the star – who has supposedly been dead for six years. Monk's working relationship with Natalie and his life both come into danger as he tries to find the common thread linking this crime to an unsolved jewel robbery. Also guest stars Mako Iwamatsu and Patrick Fischler.
41	12	"Mr. Monk Gets Cabin Fever"	Jerry Levine	Hy Conrad	February 4, 2005	5.00
When Monk witnesses a gang murder, an FBI agent (Josh Stamberg) puts him into the United States Federal Witness Protection Program to keep him safe until he can testify against the shooter. Taking shelter at a remote cabin in the woods, and accompanied by Natalie and Stottlemeyer, Monk encounters an avid fisherman (Glenn Morshower) who disappears just hours later, and Monk becomes convinced the man's wife (Faith Prince) murdered him to collect on his life insurance. Meanwhile, Disher begins dating a woman (Moon Bloodgood) who convinces him that fortune cookies can predict the future.
42	13	"Mr. Monk Gets Stuck in Traffic"	Jerry Levine	Tom Scharpling and Joe Toplyn	February 11, 2005	5.02
Monk, Natalie, and Julie get caught in a huge traffic jam caused by an overturned car with a dead body behind the wheel. Making the acquaintance of a down-and-out lawyer (Larry Miller) and receiving an unexpected tip from the band Korn, Monk uncovers a feud between an environmental activist and a construction company owner that may have led to murder.
43	14	"Mr. Monk Goes to Vegas"	Randall Zisk	Story by : Tom Scharpling and David Breckman; Teleplay by : Daniel Dratch and Joe Toplyn	February 18, 2005	5.40
Stottlemeyer drunkenly calls Monk from Las Vegas during a friend's bachelor party, claiming to have proof that a millionaire casino owner (James Brolin) murdered his wife. Monk and Natalie arrive to find him badly hung over, with no memory of what he did at the party or why he thought he had solved the case, and must also stop Disher from going broke at the blackjack table.
44	15	"Mr. Monk and the Election"	Allison Liddi	Nell Scovell	February 25, 2005	4.85
Natalie's campaign for a seat on the school board is marred first by a sniper attack on her campaign headquarters, which barely misses her and leaves a security guard dead, and later by a grenade thrown through her living room window. Suspicion falls first on Harold Krenshaw (Tim Bagley), Natalie's opponent and another of Dr. Kroger's patients, but Monk suspects that the culprit's motive may go beyond local politics. Also stars Nick Offerman.
45	16	"Mr. Monk and the Kid"	Andrei Belgrader	Tom Scharpling	March 4, 2005	4.44
Stottlemeyer calls Monk in to investigate when a toddler finds a freshly severed human finger in a park. Monk surprises everyone by volunteering to take the boy into temporary foster care, and determines that the finger belongs to a kidnapped concert violinist who is being held for ransom. Guest stars Brooke Adams and Nicole Sullivan.

== Awards and nominations ==
=== Emmy Awards ===
- Outstanding Actor – Comedy Series (Tony Shalhoub, won)
- Outstanding Directing – Comedy Series (Randall Zisk for "Mr. Monk Takes His Medicine", nominated)

=== Golden Globe Awards ===
- Best Actor – Musical or Comedy Series (Tony Shalhoub, nominated)

=== Screen Actors Guild ===
- Outstanding Actor – Comedy Series (Tony Shalhoub, won)
