= Mr. Monk and the Actor =

- Monk episode
- Episode no.: Season 5 Episode 1
- Directed by: Randall Zisk
- Written by: Hy Conrad; Joe Toplyn
- Production code: #503
- Original air date: July 7, 2006

Guest appearances
- Stanley Tucci as David Ruskin; Greg Grunberg as Jack Leverett; Susan Ward as Michelle Cullman; Peter Weller as Actor Playing Stottlemeyer; Andrea Bogart as Actress Playing Disher; Carrie Chason as Actress Playing Natalie

Episode chronology
| ← Previous "Mr. Monk Gets Jury Duty" | Next → "Mr. Monk and the Garbage Strike" |
- Monk (season 5)

"Mr. Monk and the Actor" is the first episode of the fifth season of the American comedy-drama detective television series Monk, and the show's 62nd episode overall. The series follows Adrian Monk (Tony Shalhoub), a private detective with obsessive–compulsive disorder and multiple phobias, and his assistant Natalie Teeger (Traylor Howard). In this episode, Monk has to link two different cases while an actor hired to play him in a film emotionally disturbs him.

Written by Hy Conrad and Joe Toplyn, and directed by Randall Zisk, "Mr. Monk and the Actor" guest starred Stanley Tucci. The staff envisioned the episode after imagining the possibility of Monk becoming a famous detective. When the episode first aired in the United States on the USA Network on July 7, 2006, it was watched by over 5.1 million viewers. Critics gave it a positive reception, especially praising Tucci's performance. It also led Tucci to win the Primetime Emmy Award for Outstanding Guest Actor in a Comedy Series.

== Plot ==
During an extramarital encounter with a woman named Michelle Cullman, Jack Leverett, a car dealer, finds she was using a hidden camera in order to blackmail him. Fighting for the camera, he accidentally kills her. The following day, Monk tells his therapist, Dr. Charles Kroger, that he will go on his first vacation since the murder of his wife Trudy. Later, Monk goes to the crime scene to investigate, finding watch glass fragments. Monk is informed by Captain Stottlemeyer and Lieutenant Disher that a film about him will be produced, called Killer Astronaut. Method actor David Ruskin—cast as Monk—is there to observe his mannerisms. Monk tries to impress him.

The next day, Ruskin follows Monk as he investigates a pawnshop robbery in which the owner was shot. Monk is intrigued as to why the burglar entered through the wall and stole the cheapest wristwatch there. Monk notices the same glitter on the murder weapon as he found in Cullman's hair, deducing that the same person committed both crimes, stealing the watch to replace his broken one. Natalie warns Monk that Ruskin is dangerous; he once had to be checked into a clinic for symptoms of alcoholism, despite being a non-drinker, because he was playing an alcoholic in a film.

During Killer Astronaut's filming, Ruskin has so adopted Monk's persona that he is distracted by minor details of the set and is unable to complete the scene. He goes to Monk's house to learn why Monk does his job, and explores Monk's files on Trudy's murder, grieving Monk. Monk goes to Natalie's house, where he solves the case when he sees a note that Julie tore up to prevent Natalie from reading it. The pawnshop is adjacent to a restaurant where patrons are drawn on the wall. Leverett and Cullman were sketched together while dining there, and Leverett returned to destroy that evidence. He robbed the pawnshop as a decoy explanation for the wall's destruction.

Ruskin goes to Trudy's murder scene, where he is mistaken for Monk and told that Leverett is "the killer". Stottlemeyer and Disher go to Leverett's business to arrest him for killing Cullman and the pawnshop owner. Ruskin has already arrived and is threatening him for killing Trudy. Monk stops Ruskin, but is emotionally shaken when Ruskin says he could have saved Trudy. He sets up more frequent appointments with Kroger and cancels his holiday trip.

== Production ==
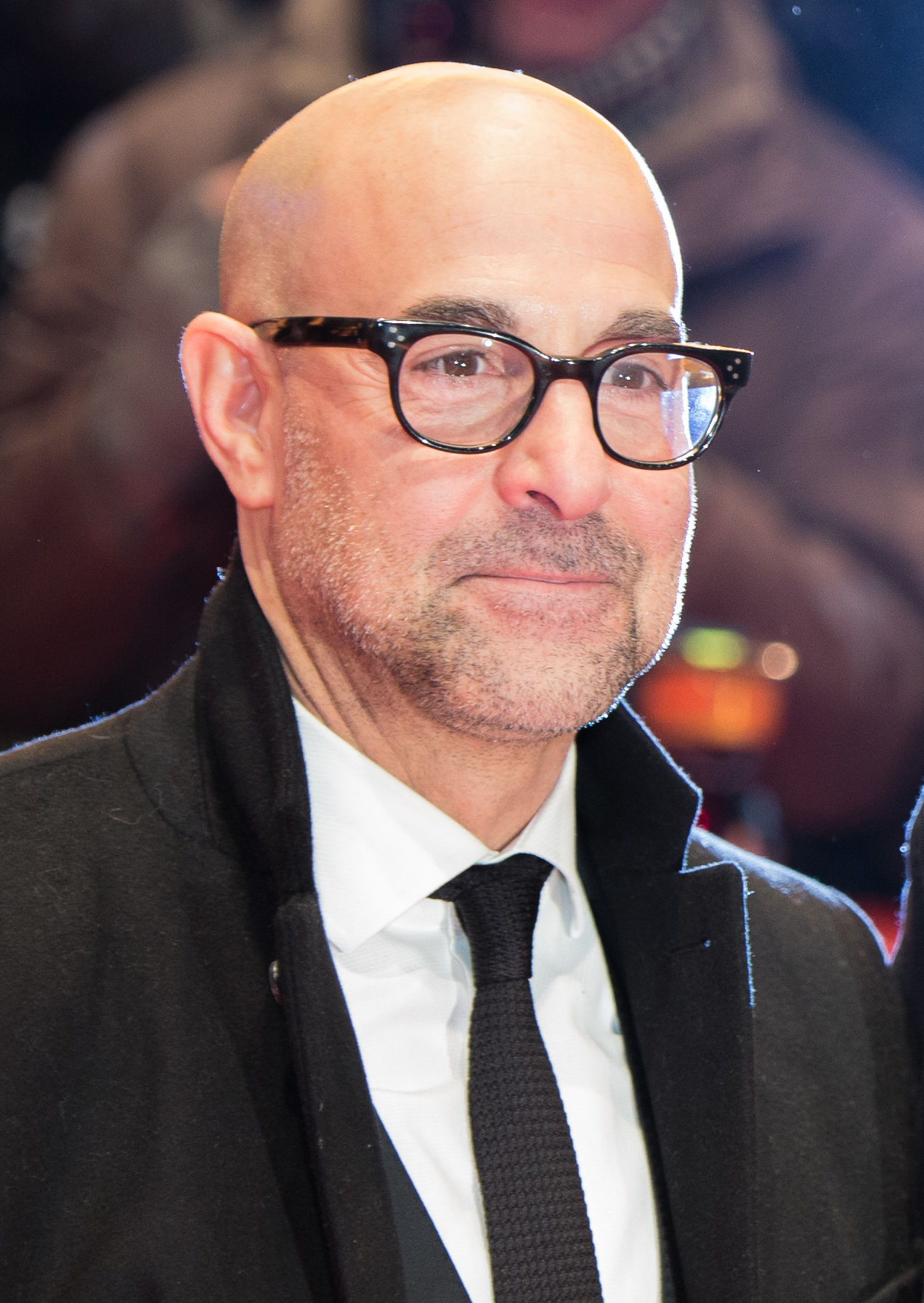
Stanley Tucci, who was "always our first choice for the actor role," guest starred in this episode. His performance was highly praised by television critics, and led Tucci to win the Primetime Emmy Award for Outstanding Guest Actor in a Comedy Series.

"Mr. Monk and the Actor" was co-written by Hy Conrad and Joe Toplyn, and was directed by Randall Zisk. The concept for the episode first emerged while the staff was working on fourth season episode "Mr. Monk and the Astronaut", and they wondered if Monk would become famous. The first idea was to use the same set and actors from "Mr. Monk and the Astronaut" to create an episode in which a made-for-TV film is recorded about that case. It was not done but writers still wanted to create an episode focusing on a TV film, which eventually became "Mr. Monk and the Actor". On its original script, it exceeded the runtime by about six minutes so a scene involving a child mistaking a gun for a toy was cut. It would be the murder weapon, and even though a six-year-old actor was hired for the scene it was not filmed.

Shalhoub and Tucci had been friends since they met each other at the Yale Repertory Theater in 1989 when they acted on John Guare's play Moon Over Miami. In 1996, they co-starred in the film Big Night, which Conrad said was the main reason Tucci was "always our first choice for the actor role." Tucci said it was a "funny thing" since the role of Monk was offered to him after Big Night but he declined it. Shalhoub affirmed he had requested Tucci to appear on Monk for a long time before this episode but Tucci had theretofore rejected due to scheduling conflicts. Another guest star for the episode, Peter Weller, was on set to direct "Mr. Monk, Private Eye" and volunteered for the role of the actor who plays Captain Stottlemeyer.

== Release and reception ==
"Mr. Monk and the Actor" was first available via video on demand service on June 30, 2006, and its television premiere through USA Network was on July 7, 2006 at 9 pm EST. According to an USA's press release, the episode was viewed by an estimated number of 5.3 million viewers, while Nielsen Media Research indicated a viewership of 5.1 million and a 3.89 rating. Gary Levin of USA Today called it a "shy" if compared to season four premiere's figure of 6.4 million. USA, however, said it was the most watched scripted hour in basic cable ever from its time slot.

The episode was well-received; IGN's Colin Moriarty gave it a score of 9 out 10, it was deemed "excellent" by John White of The Digital Fix, and it was elected by The Futon Critic's Brian Ford Sullivan the 49th best television episode of the year. Kevin McDonough, a critic for the United Feature Syndicate, called it "a great episode" and compared it to a Seinfeld episode with a similar premise.

Several critics praised Tucci's performance and his interactions with Shalhoub. Diane Werts wrote for Newsday, "Which one's nuttier? It's a toss-up, and a fascinating one with the terrific Tucci as Shalhoub's emotional tango partner." An anonymous reviewer for Times Colonist commented "Watching Shalhoub pretend to be Monk pretending to be a suave, sophisticated sleuth is a delight in its own right. Watching Tucci take Monk's nervous tics to ridiculous extremes is even more of a delight, especially when its appears that Monk's nervous disorder may be catching." In contrast to other reviewers, Adam Finley of AOL TV elected the best moment of the episode Disher's reaction to the fact his role is played by a woman who dates Stottlemeyer.

There's plenty of comedy in "Mr. Monk And The Actor." The writers wring laughs from the inaccuracies in Hollywood's versions of the series' leads, and the culminating fight scene in which Shalhoub and Tucci try to out-Monk each other is a complete joy. However, the arc of the episode serves as a microcosm for the series: Monk has a chance at some small happiness, only to have it taken away, leaving him worse than before.

— Matt Crowley, The A.V. Club

Moriarty, Matt Crowley of The A.V. Club and Variety's Paula Hendrickson used it as example of how Monk can fit comedy scenes during dramatic ones. Ann Zivotsky, a writer for the North County Times, commented, "Watching Tucci and Shalhoub play this for laughs would have been enough for some shows, but the Monk writers take the opportunity to let the movie actor share with Monk the insights he's learned about the detective, which may help, or hurt, Monk." Finley and David Kronke of Los Angeles Daily News also highlighted the line "[Ruskin] wanted to play a character that wasn't so depressing and dark. He's in England doing Hamlet."

Criticism to the episode was done by Finley who said, "So much of this show is dependent on Monk's subtle mannerisms, but he exaggerates them to an absurd degree as he tries to impress the actor who's playing him." Similarly, Werts said "Shalhoub pushes a tad too far with the compulsions." Robert Bianco of USA Today was also critical of its "excessive quirks and overall credibility-busting silliness." Although praised Shalhoub–Tucci dynamic, Rich Heldenfels of Akron Beacon Journal criticized it as "the actor-imitating-life thing has been done before on TV and in the movies, and the gag well is pretty dry."

At the 59th Primetime Emmy Awards, Tucci won the award for Outstanding Guest Actor in a Comedy Series for his role on this episode.
