= You Will (disambiguation) =

You Will may refer to:

- You Will, an AT&T marketing campaign
- You Will (album), by Anne Murray
- You Will (song), by Anne Murray, later recorded by Patty Loveless
