= Mr. Monk Gets a New Shrink =

- Monk episode
- Episode no.: Season 5 Episode 7
- Directed by: Andrei Belgrader
- Written by: Hy Conrad
- Production code: #506
- Original air date: August 18, 2006

Guest appearances
- Stanley Kamel as Dr. Charles Kroger; Tim Bagley as Harold Krenshaw; Juli Donald as Madeline Kroger; Cody McMains as Troy Kroger; Rick Curry as Dr. Jonah Sorenson; Kevin Fry as Joseph Wheeler; Gordon Clapp as Francis Merrigan; Lisa Dempsey as Teresa Mueller

Episode chronology
← Previous "Mr. Monk and the Class Reunion"	Next → "Mr. Monk Goes to a Rock Concert"
- Monk (season 5)

"Mr. Monk Gets a New Shrink" is the seventh episode of the fifth season of the American comedy-drama detective television series Monk, and the show's 68th episode overall. The series follows Adrian Monk (Tony Shalhoub), a private detective with obsessive–compulsive disorder and multiple phobias, and his assistant Natalie Teeger (Traylor Howard). In this episode, Dr. Charles Kroger (Stanley Kamel), Monk's psychiatrist, retires after blaming himself for the murder of his cleaning lady and Monk has to prove the culprit was not one of Kroger's patients.

Written by Hy Conrad and directed by Andrei Belgrader, "Mr. Monk Gets a New Shrink" was created following a long-time desire of the staff to center an episode on Kamel and make a vacuum bag pivotal in a mystery. When the episode first aired in the United States on USA Network on August 18, 2006, it was watched by 5.2 million viewers. The episode was generally well received by critics, with most of the praise regarding Kamel's major role. It also led Shalhoub to be nominated for an Emmy Award for Outstanding Lead Actor in a Comedy Series.

== Plot ==
Dr. Charles Kroger arrives at his office and finds Adrian Monk and Harold Krenshaw arguing over who should get the following session. They enter the office and find Teresa Mueller, the building's cleaning lady, dead, and the patient files scattered. Captain Stottlemeyer and Lieutenant Disher suspect that one of Dr. Kroger's patients was responsible. Dr. Kroger says it could be Joseph Wheeler, who threatened him. Dr. Kroger blames himself for not taking the threat seriously, and decides to retire, to Adrian's horror. Dr. Kroger makes an appointment for Adrian with another therapist but it is disastrous. Wheeler, however, is dismissed as a suspect as he has a confirmed alibi. Adrian and Harold in the meantime have been stalking Dr. Kroger's house at all hours, visually signalling (hostilely) to each other through opposite windows while the Krogers remain oblivious.

When Monk returns with Natalie to Dr. Kroger's office, they meet Francis Merrigan, who owns an importing and exporting business based in the same building. That night, someone throws a rock with a threatening note through the window of Dr. Kroger's house, bolstering the theory that one of his patients is the killer. Monk says he recognizes the rock, though he does not know where he saw it.

Dr. Kroger finds Monk a new therapist, Dr. Jonah Sorenson; in session, he remembers where the rock came from. Monk goes to Dr. Kroger's office and shows Dr. Kroger the rock came from the courtyard, which only Dr. Kroger and Merrigan have access to. In Merrigan's office, they find powdered milk but not a coffeemaker and, as powdered milk is made from lactose and drug dealers use it to cut heroin, Monk deduces Merrigan is trafficking drugs, and he probably also killed Teresa. Merrigan arrives, ties them to chairs, and loads them into the back of his truck.

Inside the truck, Monk sees a broken Turkish figurine and remembers the vacuum bag was empty. He deduces that Teresa, while cleaning Merrigan's office, broke a figurine, which contained heroin. Not recognizing it, she simply vacuumed it up. When Merrigan saw the broken figurine he realized what happened. He killed Teresa, spread the patient files, and later threw a rock at Dr. Kroger's house to make it look like the killer was one of Dr. Kroger's patients.

Harold follows Merrigan's truck and calls the police. At a warehouse, Harold grabs a gun from a shelf. While Dr. Kroger and Monk gesture for Harold to free them, Harold indulges in some OCD rearranging while Merrigan and his accomplice are busy trying to separate the heroin from the rest of the vacuum bag's contents. Harold makes a noise, alerting the two criminals. As Merrigan prepares to shoot Harold, the police arrive. Merrigan shoots at Dr. Kroger. Harold throws himself in front of Dr. Kroger, sustaining non-lethal injuries, and Merrigan is taken away. Dr. Kroger cancels his retirement.

== Production ==
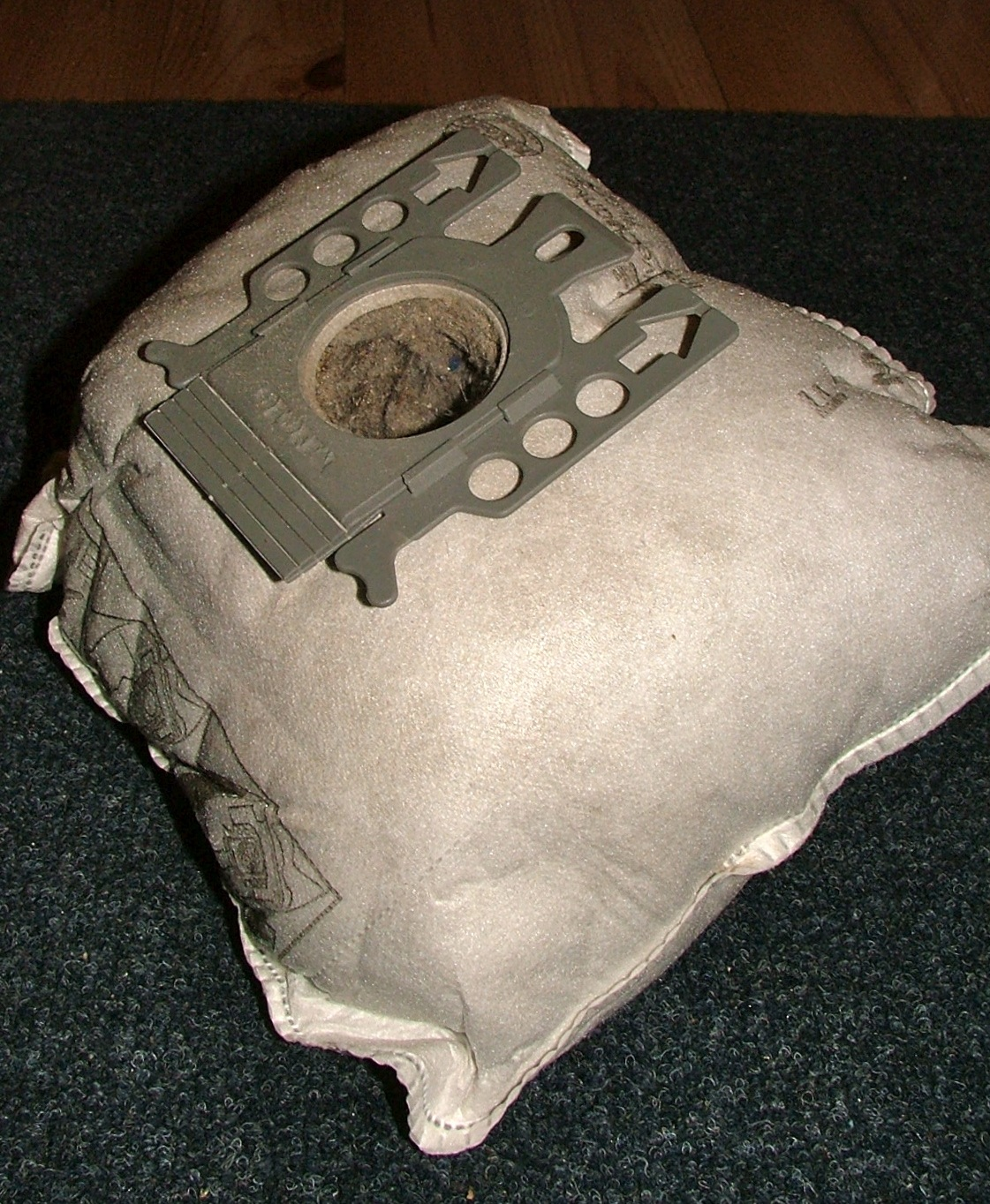
For seasons, Monk's writers had been thinking that a vacuum bag would be "a perfect piece of evidence" but were not able to materialize until "Mr. Monk Gets a New Shrink"

"Mr. Monk Gets a New Shrink" was written by Hy Conrad and directed by Andrei Belgrader. The idea of hiding the crucial piece of evidence in a vacuum bag had been on the writing table for years at the time that this episode was written. The writers' problem was that they could not get a realistic idea on how to use it. One idea had actually been to have a killer hack up his victim, place the dismembered limbs into a self-cleaning oven, then vacuum out the remains and have the bag filled with the victim. The writers saw this possibility as too gruesome for the show. Other ideas had included hiding something valuable in the bag and having the killer stalk Monk while trying to recover it.

After some time, they decided that the best method of featuring a vacuum bag was to have a cleaning lady vacuuming up the evidence. Whereas cleaning ladies had already been the murder victims of several previous episodes, here it seemed absolutely necessary if they wanted an episode to have a realistic plot. However, the writers believed that having a maid as the victim required a main character to work with in order to give some personal involvement. Monk was not considered mostly because he does not have a cleaning lady, and if he did, she would never be good enough for him because of his germophobia and meticulousness. It was eventually decided that the maid would be Dr. Kroger's employee. The idea of having her work for Dr. Kroger was successful, because the writers had been looking to have an episode where Kamel would be the focus.

This led to further complications in the writing process. For a few days, it was thought that Monk and Dr. Kroger would work to solve the case, but upon realizing that Monk would not be able to go back to a clinical detachment with Dr. Kroger, they eliminated this idea. So instead, Dr. Kroger does appear in more scenes than he normally does, but he stays out of the investigation scenes. As a result, Monk and Dr. Kroger do not break into Francis Merrigan's office to snoop around, though that would have been the typical thing to do if someone else were there. Rather, they simply peer through the sliding glass door that opens from Merrigan's office into the courtyard.

Another major challenge that came up in production was who Monk's new psychiatrist would be. Several ideas included a woman, someone too strict or too nice, someone driven crazy by Monk's compulsions, and even someone who would give Monk scream therapy. The eventual decision came from writer Jonathan Collier, who suggested a one-armed psychiatrist. Shalhoub liked the idea, but required that they recruit an actual one-armed actor to play Dr. Sorenson. The Screen Actors Guild actually had several actors waiting to audition, and the part was given to Rick Curry.

== Reception ==
"Mr. Monk Gets a New Shrink" was first broadcast in the United States on the USA Network at 9 pm EST on August 18, 2006. According to Nielsen Media Research, the episode was watched by an estimated number of 5.21 million viewers. It was the sixth most watched program on cable television that week with a 3.4 percent household rating and a household audience of 3.7 million.

The episode was well-received; Kamel elected it one of his three favorite episodes of the series, Jeffrey Robinson of DVD Talk dubbed it a "strong episode", while Adam Finley from AOL TV said it was "great". IGN's Colin Moriarty said one can "have a hardy laugh at the high level of dysfunctionality" with the episode while highlighted the one-armed therapist and mainly the interactions between Monk and Harold as the responsible for its humor. On his blog Cultural Leanings, critic Myles McNutt affirmed Shalhoub did a "tour de force comic performance" and that "It features most of Monk's best qualities: his feud with fellow patient Harold, his insecurity about his mental health, his reaction to a new therapist with only one arm, and his broad comedy." Although disliked the scene in which Harold took a shot as it was made in a cliched way, Finley enjoyed seem Dr. Kroger getting more attention. Similarly, Raven Snook, a TV Guide contributor, appreciated the fact that the doctor's home life was explored in the episode. Jon Weisman, writing for Variety, selected the scene in which Monk manifests the five stages of grief the best scene of the episode. The scene was also highlighted by Robert Licuria of the Los Angeles Times, who nevertheless said the episode felt "a bit 'same old same old.'" Chris Beachum, writing for the same newspaper, stated it was "the weakest episode" of the series to ever being submitted for the Primetime Emmy Awards, and, unlike other reviewers, considered the grief scene "just too forced and 'showy.'"

Shalhoub was nominated for Outstanding Lead Actor in a Comedy Series for this episode. However, he lost at the 59th Primetime Emmy Awards to Ricky Gervais for the Extras episode "Sir Ian McKellen".
