= It's a Jungle Out There (song) =

Song by Randy Newman
- Released: 2003
- Genre: Jazz
- Length: 1:49 (2003 version): 3:20 (2017 version)
- Songwriter: Randy Newman

"It's a Jungle Out There" is a song written by Randy Newman and used as the theme song of the TV series Monk starting with its second season. In 2004, it won an Emmy Award for Outstanding Main Title Theme Music. As the first season's theme song "Monk Theme" had won the same award the previous year, Monk became the first series to have two different theme songs win an Emmy for Outstanding Main Title Theme Music in consecutive years. The song is not to be confused with the Harry Nilsson song of the same name from his 1975 album Duit on Mon Dei.

== Themes ==
The lyrics allude to Adrian Monk's plethora of fears and warn that some degree of caution and attention is necessary to stay alive, given everyday life's many dangers.

== History ==
After the end of the first season of Monk, producer David Hoberman approached Randy Newman to create a new theme song. Newman composed the song and played it for Hoberman and Tony Shalhoub. The song debuted in the second-season premiere "Mr. Monk Goes Back to School". It was initially unpopular with some fans. USA Network reported that they received many complaints from viewers who wanted the series to continue using Jeff Beal's "Monk Theme". The controversy is referenced in the season 2 episode "Mr. Monk and the TV Star", in which Marci Maven, a dedicated fan of an in-universe detective show, complains that the program changed its theme song. She forces Monk to promise that if he ever gets a TV show, he will never change the theme song, and the original theme plays as the episode concludes.

Although the theme song remained the same, the clips used in the title sequence changed three times over the course of the series, so three different edits of the theme song were used:

- The first version is used from "Mr. Monk Goes Back to School" (at the start of season 2) through "Mr. Monk Takes His Medicine" (halfway through season 3), approximately 25 episodes.
- The shorter second version is used from "Mr. Monk and the Red Herring" (the second half of season 3) through "Mr. Monk Gets Jury Duty" (end of season 4). This version was introduced because Bitty Schram quit her role as Sharona Fleming and was replaced by Traylor Howard as Natalie Teeger, necessitating the removal of the title sequence's clips featuring Sharona. This version was used in approximately 23 episodes and replaced several season 1 and season 2 clips with clips from other season 2 and season 3 episodes.
- The third and final version was used starting in season 5 with the episode "Mr. Monk and the Actor" and through the series finale. This version was used for approximately 64 episodes, and brought in clips from season 4 and season 5 episodes.

Newman wrote another song, "When I'm Gone," for the final episode, "Mr. Monk and the End". The song won the 2010 Emmy Award for Outstanding Original Music and Lyrics.

As the show appears on Peacock and Prime Video, the first two-part episode has been edited to include the Randy Newman theme.

== Other versions ==
Snoop Dogg covered the song for the season 6 episode "Mr. Monk and the Rapper", in which he also played a guest role as Murderuss, a rapper accused of murder.

A rerecorded and expanded version of "It's a Jungle Out There" appears on Newman's 2017 album Dark Matter.

== Awards ==
- 2004 Emmy Award for Outstanding Main Title Theme Music
- 2005 ASCAP Top TV Series Award
