= Dirty Work (1998 film) =

- Theatrical release poster
- Directed by: Bob Saget
- Written by: Frank Sebastiano; Norm Macdonald; Fred Wolf
- Produced by: Robert Simonds
- Starring: Norm Macdonald; Jack Warden; Artie Lange; Traylor Howard; Don Rickles; Christopher McDonald; Chevy Chase
- Cinematography: Arthur Albert
- Edited by: George Folsey Jr.
- Music by: Richard Gibbs
- Production companies: Metro-Goldwyn-Mayer Pictures; Robert Simonds Productions
- Distributed by: MGM Distribution Co.
- Release date: June 12, 1998
- Running time: 82 minutes
- Country: United States
- Language: English
- Budget: $13 million
- Box office: $10 million

Dirty Work is a 1998 American comedy film directed by Bob Saget. The film follows long-time friends Mitch (Norm Macdonald) and Sam (Artie Lange) who start a revenge-for-hire business, and work to fund heart surgery for Sam's father Pops (Jack Warden). Christopher McDonald and Traylor Howard also star, and notable cameo appearances include Don Rickles, Rebecca Romijn, John Goodman (uncredited), Gary Coleman, Chevy Chase, David Koechner, Chris Farley (uncredited in his final film appearance), and Adam Sandler (uncredited).

The film was the first starring vehicle for Macdonald and Lange, and the directorial debut of Saget, coming one year after he left his long-running role as host of America's Funniest Home Videos.

Upon its theatrical release on June 12, 1998 by MGM, Dirty Work received largely negative critical reviews and was a disappointment at the box office. It has since become a cult classic and has been reappraised more positively by some critics. A sequel was planned but ultimately canceled following Macdonald and Saget's respective deaths in the early 2020s.

== Plot ==
Growing up, friends Mitch Weaver and Sam McKenna are taught by Sam's no-nonsense father, "Pops" McKenna, not to "take crap from anyone." To that end, the pair plant a bunch of guns in the school bully's desk and have him arrested for gun possession. Next, they catch a kid-fondling crossing guard in the act, after having applied Krazy Glue to the back of Mitch's pants.

As adults, after losing fourteen jobs in three months and being dumped by his girlfriend, Mitch moves in with Sam and Pops. Shortly after, Pops has a heart attack. In the hospital, Pops confides that, because of their parents' swinging lifestyle, he is also Mitch's father, meaning that Mitch and Sam are half-brothers. Dr. Farthing, a hopeless gambler, agrees to raise Mr. McKenna's position on the heart transplant waiting list if he is paid $50,000, to pay off his bookie. Mitch and Sam get jobs in a cinema with an abusive manager and exact their revenge by showing a gay pornographic film to a packed house and get their manager fired. The other workers congratulate them and suggest they go into business.

Mitch and Sam open "Dirty Work", a revenge-for-hire business. Mitch falls for a woman named Kathy who works for a hot-tempered used car dealer. After publicly humiliating him during a live television commercial, the duo exacts increasingly lucrative reprisals for satisfied customers, until they cross paths with duplicitous local property developer, Travis Cole. Cole tricks them into destroying "his" apartment building (actually owned by Mr. John Kirkpatrick, the landlord), promising to pay them enough to save Pops. Afterwards, Cole reneges, revealing that he is not the owner and that he had them vandalize the building so that he could buy it cheaply, evict the tenants (including Kathy's grandmother), and build a parking lot for his beloved opera house. Unbeknownst to Cole, Mitch's tape recorder captures the confession.

Mitch and Sam plot their revenge on Cole, using the tape to set up an elaborate trap. Using skunks, an army of prostitutes, homeless men, their friend Jimmy, brownies with hallucinogenic additives, and Pops, they ruin the opening night of Don Giovanni, an opera sponsored prominently by Cole. With the media present, Mitch plays back Cole's confession over the theater's sound system. Cole sees that his public image is being ruined and agrees to pay the $50,000. In the end, Cole is punched in the stomach and arrested, while his dog is sexually assaulted by a skunk. Pops gets his operation, and Mitch gets the girl. Dr. Farthing overcomes his gambling addiction, but gets killed by the bookies anyway.

== Cast ==
- Norm Macdonald as Mitch Weaver, a lovable loser
- Artie Lange as Sam McKenna, Mitch's best friend and half-brother
- Jack Warden as Pops McKenna, Sam and Mitch's father
- Traylor Howard as Kathy, Mitch's love interest
- Christopher McDonald as Travis Cole, a ruthless real estate magnate
- Chevy Chase as Dr. Farthing, a gambling-addicted heart surgeon

Cameo appearances

- Adam Sandler (uncredited) as Satan
- John Goodman (uncredited) as Mayor Adrian Riggins
- Chris Farley (uncredited) as Jimmy, Mitch and Sam's drinking buddy
- Don Rickles as Mr. Hamilton, theater owner
- Rebecca Romijn as bearded lady
- Gary Coleman as himself
- George Chuvalo as ring announcer
- Ken Norton as himself
- David Koechner as Anton Phillips, a used car dealer
- Jim Downey as homeless man
- Fred Wolf as homeless man
- Kevin Farley as theater worker
- Anthony J. Mifsud as Low Life
- Gord Martineau as reporter
- Chris Gillett as Mr. Witherspoon

== Production and release ==
Filmed at Wycliffe College and elsewhere around Toronto, Ontario, Canada in 1997, the film was produced for an estimated $13 million.

In his first appearance on The Howard Stern Show on September 18, 2008, Chevy Chase discussed the film's production and release with Artie Lange. According to Chase, he was impressed by the original script's raunchy, R-rated, "over the top" tone (particularly a filmed but ultimately cut gag involving Mitch and Sam delivering donuts that had been photographed around their genitals) and, Lange related, went so far as to beg Macdonald not to allow any changes—to "keep it funny". Lange said the studio insisted on a PG-13 rating and moved the film's release from the February dump months to June, where it fared poorly against blockbusters like Godzilla.

During production, Macdonald was embroiled in a feud with Don Ohlmeyer, then an executive with NBC. Ohlmeyer, a friend of O. J. Simpson, took offense at Macdonald's frequent and pointed jokes about Simpson on Weekend Update and had Macdonald fired from the position. Ohlmeyer went further and refused to sell advertising space or air commercials for Dirty Work. NBC eventually relented a week after the film premiered; Ohlmeyer was forced into retirement not long afterward.

Dirty Work was Chris Farley's last-released film appearance, filmed before his fatal drug overdose in December 1997.

Macdonald offered Howard Stern the role of Satan but he declined. Adam Sandler was eventually cast instead.

== Reception ==
On the review aggregator website Rotten Tomatoes, 20% of 59 critics' reviews are positive, with an average rating of 3.6/10. The website's consensus reads: "Norm Macdonald's dry wit and oddball charm fail to get the job done in Dirty Work, a sloppy and scattershot comedy that delivers more groans than laughs." Metacritic, which uses a weighted average, assigned the film a score of 24 out of 100, based on 15 critics, indicating "generally unfavorable" reviews. Audiences polled by CinemaScore gave the film an average grade of "C+" on an A+ to F scale.

Critics mostly gave negative reviews. It was referred to as a "leaden, taste-deprived attempted comedy" and "a desert of comedy" with only infrequent humor in The New York Times. The Los Angeles Times described it as "a tone-deaf, scattershot and dispiritingly cheesy affair with more groans than laughs", and though Macdonald "does uncork a few solid one-liners", his lack of conviction in his acting "is amusing in and of itself, but it doesn't help the movie much". The San Francisco Chronicle recommended the film only for "people who like stupid lowdown vulgar comedy. I had a few good laughs."

The film has been described as a "cult classic". In his column, My Year of Flops, critic Nathan Rabin describes Dirty Work as an example of "the ironic dumb comedy, the slyly postmodern lowbrow gag-fest that so lustily, nakedly embraces and exposes the machinations and conventions of stupid laffers that it becomes a sort of sublime bit of meta-comedy".

The film particularly resonated with several notable New Jersey punk rock musicians. The Ergs! named their two singles collections, 2008's Hindsight is 20/20, My Friend and 2016's Hindsight is 20/20, My Friend Vol. 2: Okay, Enough Reminiscing, and their 2008 EP, That's It... Bye, after lines from the movie. A group called The Hamiltons, who are speculated to be The Ergs! released an EP titled Don't Mess Up!, inspired by the movie. In addition to The Ergs!, For Science, released a 2006 album titled Revenge for Hire, and Mike Hunchback, who played guitar for Worriers, Night Birds, and Screeching Weasel, appears on the commentary track for the film's 4K release, along with co-writer Frank Sebastiano.

== Cancelled sequel ==
When discussing a possible sequel to Dirty Work in 2018, Macdonald stated "It was an R-rated movie, so we made it that way, then they made it [PG-13], so half the movie had to be cut. So it's hard for me to see it objectively. There might be another one coming now, I guess." Macdonald did not elaborate further regarding the potential sequel. Bob Saget spoke about the sequel in May 2021 in an interview with Kevin Hart on his podcast, "Comedy Gold Minds". Hart praised the film's moments and innovations, to which Saget replied, "you want to be in the sequel, we're making it?". Hart said he would do a cameo without hesitation, declaring Dirty Work to be one of his favorite movies of all time. Macdonald died four months later in September 2021, essentially ending talks of a sequel, followed soon after by Saget’s death in January 2022.

== Home media ==
MGM Home Entertainment released the film on DVD and for digital rental/purchase in August, 1999.

In May 2025, Vinegar Syndrome announced work on a 4K extended cut of the film, based on the original version shown at test screenings which contained seven minutes of footage later edited out for the general release. On July 29, 2025, the label released a 4K/Blu-ray set of Dirty Work containing restorations of both the theatrical and extended ("Dirtier") cuts of the film, commentary tracks for both cuts, a 2-hour assembly cut workprint, the 63-minute retrospective documentary Note to Self: Doing Dirty Work, and cast and crew interviews.

== See also ==
- List of films featuring fictional films
