= Mr. Monk Gets Jury Duty =

- Monk episode
- Episode no.: Season 4 Episode 16
- Directed by: Andrei Belgrader
- Written by: Peter Wolk
- Production code: #T-2365
- Original air date: March 17, 2006

Guest appearances
- Carlos Gómez as Miguel Escobar; Michael Weaver as Agent Lapides; Clyde Kusatsu as Judge Rienzo; Blake Silver as Karl Pillemer (the victim); Edo Walker as Robert Perry (the defendant); Jurors; 1. Bonita Friedericy as the Housewife; 2. David Ackert as Patel; 3. Carlease Burke as the Teacher; 4. Wings Hauser as Mr. Cobb; 5. Bryan Coffee as the Sneezing Man; 6. Kimi Reichenberg as the Pierced Girl; 7. Benito Martinez as the Ex-Marine (Foreman); 8. Darlene Kardon as the Sweet Old Lady; 9. Van Epperson as the Postal Worker; 10. Kevin Bernsten as the Sports Fan; 11. Tony Shalhoub as Adrian Monk; 12. Emmanuelle Vaugier as Pat

Episode chronology
| ← Previous "Mr. Monk Goes to the Dentist" | Next → "Mr. Monk and the Actor" |
- Monk (season 4)

"Mr. Monk Gets Jury Duty" is the sixteenth and final episode of the fourth season of the American comedy-drama detective television series Monk, and is the show's 61st episode overall. The series follows the adventures of Adrian Monk (Tony Shalhoub), a private detective with obsessive–compulsive disorder and multiple phobias, and his assistant Natalie Teeger (Traylor Howard). In this episode, Monk is requested to be part of a jury for a minor crime but discovers one of the jurors is involved in a bigger crime.

Peter Wolk wrote the episode, which drew influences from the film 12 Angry Men. When "Mr. Monk Gets Jury Duty" first aired in the United States on USA Network on March 17, 2006, it was watched by 5.4 million viewers. The episode was generally well received by critics, who praised its humor and homage to 12 Angry Men.

== Plot ==
Captain Stottlemeyer (Ted Levine) and Lieutenant Disher (Jason Gray-Stanford) capture Miguel Escobar (Carlos Gómez), an FBI's Most Wanted List–drug lord. FBI Agent Lapides (Michael Weaver) informs them that they must keep Escobar in custody until he can be handed over to the federal government.

Elsewhere, Monk (Tony Shalhoub) has been selected for jury duty on the case of a young man named Robert Perry (Edo Walker), who has been accused of stabbing and robbing a man named Karl Pillemer (Blake Silver). The other jurors are convinced of the accused's guilt, but Monk is not. He claims that the wound was self-inflicted and the knife placed in Perry's hand while he was sleeping so Pillemer could pocket the money.

During the jury deliberation, Monk sees a police dog sniffing around a dumpster outside the courthouse and deduces that a body is hidden inside. Natalie (Traylor Howard) and Disher find the body of a woman with no identification, and Monk remembers that she was in the assembly room when the jurors were selected. The following day, Monk shows the jurors evidence to prove that Pillemer has framed Perry. The jurors are convinced except for one woman, Pat (Emmanuelle Vaugier), who changes her vote to guilty before leaving for the bathroom. On Pat's jacket, Monk finds traces of lime, which he had seen on a tarp covering the body.

Monk deduces that Pat killed the woman to get on the jury using her identity, and is consistently voting contrary to the other jurors in order to extend the deliberations. However, none of the jurors, not even Monk, know that Pat is Escobar's girlfriend, and it is the day that Escobar will be transferred to federal custody. At Monk's urging, the jurors all vote guilty so that he can observe her response. She reacts by producing a gun, knocking the bailiff unconscious, and leaving the jurors bound and gagged to their chairs. She draws the blinds down but leaves them uneven.

Meanwhile, Escobar is about to get on the courthouse elevator when his girlfriend shoots the guards. Natalie notices the uneven blinds in the jury room window and realizes something must be wrong. She breaks into the jury room and frees Monk; seeing the elevator rise instead of descend, Monk realizes that the two intend to slide from the roof to the dumpster via a garbage chute. He and Natalie call Stottlemeyer to warn him, and the police reach the dumpster just in time to apprehend Escobar and his girlfriend.

== Production ==
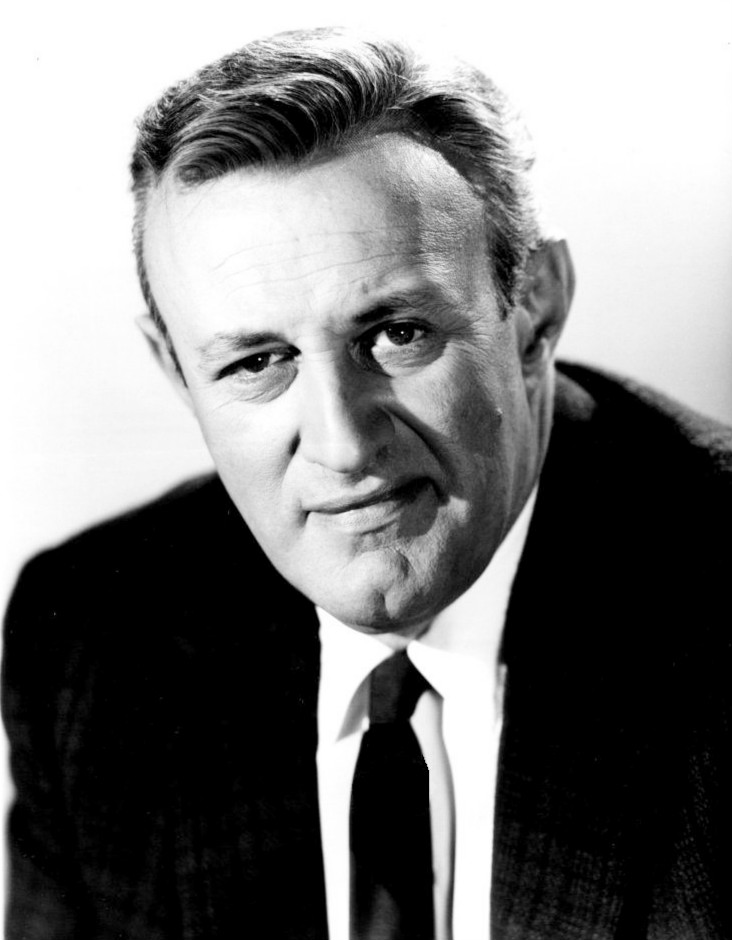
12 Angry Men served as inspiration for "Mr. Monk Gets Jury Duty". In the picture, Lee J. Cobb, actor in the film, whose last name was used to name Juror No. 4 of the episode.

"Mr. Monk Gets Jury Duty" was written by Peter Wolk and directed by Andrei Belgrader. While this marked Belgrader's fourth directing credit in the series, (Note: Belgrader previously directed season three's "Mr. Monk Gets Fired" and "Mr. Monk and the Kid" and season four's "Mr. Monk Gets Drunk".) it was Wolk's second episode, following season three's "Mr. Monk Gets Fired". Wolk, who previously worked as a criminal defense attorney, had also written for courtroom-themed works such as The Defenders and Fighting the Odds. The story was written by Wolk over a week in 2005 in Summit, New Jersey. The episode was mostly filmed in Los Angeles, apart from the opening Chinatown chase scene, which was shot on-location in San Francisco. Some exteriors were also filmed in other San Francisco Bay Area locations.

The jury subplot was heavily inspired by the 1957 film 12 Angry Men. For example, juror Mr. Cobb was named after Lee J. Cobb (who portrayed Juror No. 3 in the film), while the panning shot of the jury room was inspired by an identical shot toward the end of 12 Angry Men.

== Reception ==
"Mr. Monk Gets Jury Duty" was first broadcast in the United States on the USA Network at 10 pm EST on March 17, 2006. According to Nielsen Media Research, the episode was viewed by an estimated number of 5.4 million people, making it the second-highest-viewed cable series of the week of March 13–19. 50,000 Monk fans from Green Bay voted it as the 12th best episode of the series in January 2007 (out of 71).

Adam Finley of TV Squad called the episode "decent," but later went on to say "[Monk's] interaction between the rest of the jurors was hysterical." A reviewer for TV Guide called it "a humdinger of an episode", praised the chemistry between Shalhoub and Howard, and said the "ID-idea" joke was "neo-screwball comedy at its best." The Digital Fix's Jon White praised the homage to 12 Angry Men, saying it shows the "obvious" care the last four episodes of the season received. The Brazilian counterpart to Universal Channel, who broadcast Monk in the country, elected it as one of the ten best episodes of the series in 2014.
