= You Will =

AT&T marketing campaign

"You Will" was an AT&T marketing campaign that launched in 1993, consisting of commercials directed by David Fincher. Each ad presented a futuristic scenario beginning with "Have you ever…" and ending with "…you will. And the company that will bring it to you: AT&T."

The ads were narrated by Tom Selleck.

The creative team that created the ad campaign at N.W. Ayer & Partners were Copy Supervisor Gordon Hasse, Art Supervisor Nick Scordato and Producer Gaston Braun.

One of the first web banner ads ever sold was part of an AT&T campaign that ran on HotWired starting October 27, 1994, asking "Have you ever clicked your mouse right HERE? You Will".

In 2016, technology writer Timothy B. Lee commented that "overall, the ads were remarkably accurate in predicting the cutting-edge technologies of the coming decades. But the ads were mostly wrong about one thing: the company that brought these technologies to the world was not AT&T. At least not on its own. AT&T does provide some of the infrastructure on which the world's communications flow. But the gadgets and software that brought these futuristic capabilities to consumers were created by a new generation of Silicon Valley companies that mostly didn't exist when these ads were made."

The ads won a few different awards at the time, notably the first annual David Ogilvy Award for the most effective campaign supported by research, the 1994 PCIA (Personal Communications Industry Award), and two ADDY Awards.

== Innovations ==
The proposed innovations included:

- Grocery checkout machines that would process an entire cart at a time without the groceries needing to be removed, presumably via RFID or something similar ("Have you ever checked out at the supermarket, a whole cart at a time?")
- Telemedicine ("[Have you ever] put your heads together, when you're not together?")
- Intelligent personal assistants ("Have you ever had an assistant who lived in your computer?")
- Videoconferencing ("Have you ever shown up for a meeting in your bare feet?")
- GPS navigation systems with automatic rerouting based on live traffic ("Have you ever crossed the country without stopping to ask directions?")
- Wi-Fi/WAN, tablet computing and portable pen computing ("Have you ever sent a fax from the beach?")
- Smartwatches ("[Have you ever] gotten a phone call, on your wrist?")
- Self-service kiosks ("Have you ever renewed your drivers license at a cash machine?")
- Real-time online collaboration, envisioned as two students teaching each other their native languages over videophone ("Have you ever studied with a classmate thousands of miles away?") and, in a separate ad, as a father reading a bed-time story to his child remotely, while they both view the same page of the story on their individual laptops.
- Online libraries ("Have you ever borrowed a book, thousands of miles away?")
- Electronic toll collection ("Have you ever paid a toll without slowing down?")
- Video on demand ("Have you ever watched the movie you wanted to, when you wanted to?")
- A combination of video conferencing, speech recognition, and translation software ("[Have you ever] conducted business in a language you don't understand?")
- Home automation ("[Have you ever] kept an eye on your home when you're not at home?") which is accessed in the ad via what resembles a touchscreen smartphone.
- Distance learning ("[Have you ever] learned special things, from faraway places"?) as a student learns the history of jazz via video conference with his teacher.
