= Jerry Levine =

American actor, television and theatre director

- Born: March 12, 1957 (age 69); New Brunswick, New Jersey, U.S.
- Education: Boston University (BFA)
- Occupations: Actor, television director, theatre director
- Years active: 1984–present
- Spouse: Nina Tassler (m. 1984)
- Children: 2

Jerry Levine (born March 12, 1957) is an American actor and director of television and theatre. As an actor, he is best known for his roles as Joe on Will & Grace, Stiles in the 1985 feature film Teen Wolf and Jamie in the 1988 film Casual Sex?

== Life and career ==
Levine was born on March 12, 1957, in New Brunswick, New Jersey, and was raised in nearby Highland Park, where he graduated from Highland Park High School in 1975. Levine graduated from Boston University with a Bachelor of Fine Arts degree.

After spending the early part of his career working primarily in the theatre, his television career as an actor started on the series Charles in Charge in 1984. He quickly moved into film as well with his debut in 1985's Teen Wolf, alongside Michael J. Fox. He starred in the ensemble television drama The Bronx Zoo, which premiered as a mid-season replacement on NBC in 1987 and ran for two seasons. Other films include Iron Eagle (1986), K-9 (1989) and Oliver Stone's Vietnam War feature Born on the Fourth of July (1989) starring Tom Cruise.

Levine later starred in the 1990–91 sitcom, Going Places with Alan Ruck and Heather Locklear. He appeared in numerous series including Boy Meets World, Chicago Hope, Seinfeld, Monk and Will & Grace.

In 1994, Levine produced and directed a Met Theater stage production of the one-act play Sticks & Stones, the first produced work by screenwriters Drew McWeeny and Scott Swan. He also directed a number of other stage productions on Broadway.

In 1999, Levine started television directing, with five episodes of Boy Meets World and an episode of Chicago Hope. Both of these series ended in 2000. He then went on to direct twelve episodes of Monk, from 2002 to 2009. He also directed episodes of The Twilight Zone, The District, Joan of Arcadia, Jonas, Life Unexpected, Raising Hope, Ringer, 90210, Everybody Hates Chris, Hawaii Five-0 and It's Always Sunny in Philadelphia.
