= Stanley Kamel =

American actor (1943–2008)

- Kamel in 2008
- Born: January 1, 1943; South River, New Jersey, US
- Died: April 8, 2008 (aged 65); Los Angeles, California, US
- Other names: Stanley Camel, Stan Kamel
- Education: Boston University (BFA)
- Occupation: Actor
- Years active: 1968–2008

Stanley Kamel (January 1, 1943 – April 8, 2008) was an American actor. From 2002 until his death in 2008, he played Dr. Charles Kroger on the American television series Monk.

== Early life, family and education ==
Kamel was born to a Jewish family and raised in South River, New Jersey. He attended Rutgers Preparatory School and Boston University, graduating with a BFA in 1965.

== Career ==
Kamel started his acting career off-Broadway. He began appearing on television in 1968, appearing in many episodic one-off appearances over decades. He broke into television with a role in Days of Our Lives (1972–76) as the second actor to play the character Eric Peters. Among the many series in which he performed were: The Mod Squad, Barney Miller, Kojak, Lou Grant, Quincy M.E., Hill Street Blues, L.A. Law, Murder, She Wrote, Cagney & Lacey, Matlock, Hooperman, Father Dowling Mysteries, Star Trek: The Next Generation, Scarecrow and Mrs. King, The Nanny, and The Lazarus Man.

He had a recurring role on Melrose Place in 1994 as Bruce Teller, the CEO of D&D Advertising, where Amanda (Heather Locklear) and Allison (Courtney Thorne-Smith) were employed. During the first part of the sixth season of Beverly Hills, 90210, Kamel appeared on several episodes as Anthony Marchette, an organized crime figure.

Kamel was well known for his role as Dr. Charles Kroger in the USA Network television series Monk, playing the patient and ever-supportive psychiatrist to the main character, Adrian Monk (played by Tony Shalhoub). Though his last appearance was in the sixth season of Monk, clips of his character were seen in the series finale.

== Personal life and death ==
Kamel never married and had no children.

On April 8, 2008, Kamel was found dead of a heart attack in his Hollywood Hills home. He was 65 years old. "Mr. Monk Buys a House", the premiere episode of the seventh season of Monk, was dedicated to his memory and included a mention of his character (Dr. Kroger) dying of a heart attack. The final shot of the episode was a close-up of a photo of Kamel, as Dr. Kroger, on Monk's fireplace mantle.

== Filmography ==
=== Film ===
List of Stanley Kamel film credits
Year	Title	Role	Notes
1971	Bacchanale	The Lover	
1978	Corvette Summer	Las Vegas Con Man	
1979	In Search of Historic Jesus	Andrew	Documentary
1982	Making Love	Charlie	
1983	Star 80	Nick	
1983	I'm Going to Be Famous		
1990	Dead Men Don't Die	Archie	
1990	Murder by Numbers	George	
1993	Come the Morning	Randall	
1995	Automatic	Seth Baker	
1997	Ravager	Clean	
1997	Eat Your Heart Out	Michael Stark	
1999	A Fare to Remember	Mr. Gault	
1999	Running Red	Alexi	
1999	Stonebrook	Tali	
2000	Escape Under Pressure	Sub Commander	
2001	The A-List	Buchwald	Short
2003	Judge Koan	Judge Koan	
2005	Domino	Anthony Cigliutti	
2006	Inland Empire	Koz Kakawski	
2007	Jane Doe: How to Fire Your Boss	Dr. Jared Fox	Straight-to-video
2008	The Urn	Joseph	Final film role

=== Television ===
List of Stanley Kamel television credits
Year	Title	Role	Notes
1969	Mannix	Rich Gaines	Episode: "Tooth of the Serpent"
1969	Mission: Impossible	Male Patient	Episode: "The Controllers: Part 1"
1971	The Mod Squad	Nick Harris	Episode: "Is that Justice? No, It's the law."
1972	Mannix	John "Gemini" Boling	Episode: "The Upside-Down Penny"
1972	The Rookies	Lou	Episode: "A Bloody Shade of Blue"
1972	The Sixth Sense	Killer	Episode: "The Eyes That Wouldn't Die"
1972	Short Walk to Daylight	Ernie Delion	TV movie
1972–1976	Days of Our Lives	Eric Peters #2	
1973	Emergency!	Harry Rivers	Episode: "An English Visitor"
1974	Owen Marshall: Counselor at Law	Essex Taylor	Episode: "To Keep and Bear Arms"
1974	Get Christie Love!	Marvin	Episode: "Emperor of Death Street"
1974, 1977	Kojak	Clyde Bruckner / Bert Marino	2 episodes
1975	Switch	Eddie Matlock	Episode: "The Late Show Murders"
1975	McMillan & Wife	Sable	Episode: "Requiem for a Bride"
1976	Mallory: Circumstantial Evidence	Cole	TV movie
1977	In the Glitter Palace	Director	TV movie
1977, 1981	Quincy, M.E.	Max Cullis / Attorney Dave Bremmerhouse	2 episodes
1978	Starsky & Hutch		
1978	Charlie's Angels	Dinsmore	Episode: "Hours of Desperation"
1979	240-Robert	Prisoner	Episode: "Acting Sergeant"
1979	The Incredible Hulk	Gary	Episode: "Captive Night"
1979	Captain America II: Death Too Soon	Kramer	TV movie
1979, 1981	Lou Grant	Marty Niles / Dr. Weyland	2 episodes
1979, 1982	Barney Miller	Lance Parks / Dr. Michael Packer	2 episodes
1980	The Gossip Columnist	Phil	TV movie
1981	Eight Is Enough	Bruce Taylor	Episode: "Bradfordgate"
1981	House Calls	Lenny	Episode: "My Son, the Anarchist"
1981	The Phoenix	Murray	Episode: "Pilot"
1981	Mork & Mindy	Charlie	Episode: "My Dad Can't Beat Up Anybody"
1982	Three's Company	Clean Cut Man Packer	Episode: "Opening Night"
1983–1985	Hill Street Blues	Agent Ramsey	3 episodes
1983–1988	Cagney & Lacey	Det. Mick Solomon	7 episodes
1984	Riptide	Colonel Davidson	Episode: "The Orange Grove"
1984	Knight Rider	Sonny Martin	Episode: "Dead of Knight"
1984	My Mother's Secret Life	Larry Fenton	TV movie
1984	Old Friends	Charlie	TV movie
1984	Victims for Victims: The Theresa Saldana Story	D.A. Mike Knight	TV movie
1985	A Bunny's Tale	Jerry	TV movie
1985	The Rape of Richard Beck	Dr. Greenberg	TV movie
1985	Hardcastle and McCormick	Zimmerman	Episode: "Surprise on Seagull Beach"
1985	The Fall Guy	Carl Trenton	Episode: "The Life of Riley"
1985	Rituals	DA Don Wallace	
1986	Scarecrow and Mrs. King	Steven Sallee	Episode: "Dead Men Leave No Trails"
1986	Mr. Belvedere	Lawrence Miller	Episode: "Deportation: Part 1"
1986–1991	L.A. Law	Mark Gilliam	5 episodes
1987	Star Trek: The Next Generation	Kosinski	Episode: "Where No One Has Gone Before"
1987–1988	Hunter	Brad Wilkes, FBI	4 episodes
1987, 1990	Matlock	Mark Douglas / Clayton Ross	2 episodes
1988	Hooperman	Dr. Kenwood	Episode: "Blaste from the Past"
1988	Probe	Marty Corrigan	Episode: "Black Cats Don't Walk Under Ladders (Do They?)"
1988	Buck James	Dennis Osterman	Episode: "Top Secret"
1988	The Highwayman	Cisco	Episode: "Frightmare"
1989	Guns of Paradise	Mr. Sweet	Episode: "A Private War"
1989	Mancuso, FBI	Stein	Episode: "Conflict of Interest"
1989–1990	Beauty and the Beast	George Walker	2 episodes
1989–1990	Murder, She Wrote	Frankie, the Bartender / Sid Staples	2 episodes
1990	Columbo	Tim Haines	Episode: "Agenda for Murder"
1990	Empty Nest	Monsieur Gerard	Episode: "A Flaw Is Born"
1990	Valerie's Family	Steven Eisenberg	Episode: "It Happened One Night... Or Did It?"
1990	We'll Take Manhattan	Director	TV movie
1990	Bar Girls	Judge	TV movie
1990–1991	Father Dowling Mysteries	Leo Chaplin / Ron Baylor	2 episodes
1991	The Golden Girls	Herb Shrewsberry	2 episodes
1991	Reasonable Doubts	John Callahan	Episode: "Dicky's Got the Blues"
1991	MacGyver	Victor Kasanti	Episode: "Off the Wall"
1992	2000 Malibu Road	Mr. Adler	Episode: "Pilot"
1993	Homefront	Mr. Smith	Episode: "By Word or Act"
1993–1994	Diagnosis: Murder	Dr. Larry Wright / Wayne Topping	2 episodes
1994	Melrose Place	Bruce Teller	13 episodes
1994	Honor Thy Father and Mother: The True Story of the Menendez Murders	Dr. Jerome Oziel	TV movie
1995	Beverly Hills, 90210	Tony Marchette	8 episodes
1995–1996	Murder One	Dr. Graham Lester	8 episodes
1996	Dark Skies	Dr. Ron Burnside	Episode: "Dark Days Night"
1997	Renegade	Anthony Capezi	Episode: "Knock Out"
1997	ER	Dr. 'Fin' Leosch	Episode: "Random Acts"
1997	The Nanny	Condo Representative	Episode: "The Boca Story"
1997	Pensacola: Wings of Gold	Grissom	Episode: "Grey Ghost"
1998	Martial Law	Dr. Ron Burnside	Episode: "Malcolm Devrons"
1998	Like Father, Like Santa	Leland Jennings	TV movie
1999	L.A. Doctors	Dr. Crosswell	Episode: "Been There, Done That"
1999	Cracker	Pat Vicker	Episode: "Faustian Fitz"
1999	7th Heaven	Shana's Dad	Episode: "Yak Sada"
2000	NYPD Blue	Noel Beller	Episode: "The Irvin Files"
2000	Dark Angel	Edgar Sonrisa	Episode: "Pilot"
2000	An American Daughter	Dr. Blumberg	TV movie
2001	The Geena Davis Show	Carl	Episode: "Photo Finish"
2002	Six Feet Under	Death	Episode: "In the Game"
2002–2008	Monk	Dr. Charles Kroger	43 episodes
2003	Mister Sterling	Arthur Peyton	5 episodes
2003	The Guardian	James Fuller	Episode: "Swimming"
2003	General Hospital	Cody McCall	5 episodes
2004	The D.A.	Judge	Episode: "The People vs. Patricia Henry"
2004	The West Wing	Stanley	Episode: "In the Room"
2005	Reba	Mac	Episode: "Issues"
2006	Last Day	Sorin	Short
2007	Eyes	Social Services Employee	Episode: "Whistleblower"
