= Randy Zisk =

American television director and television producer

- Born: Randall Zisk; United States
- Education: University of Southern California
- Occupations: Director, producer, writer
- Spouse: Jennifer Grant (m. 1993; div. 1996)
- Relatives: Craig Zisk (brother)

Randall "Randy" Zisk is an American television director, producer, and writer.

== Biography ==
He graduated from the University of Southern California and is a native of Dallas, Texas, where he graduated from St. Mark's School of Texas. His family is Jewish. His brother, Craig Zisk, also works in television. As both a director and producer, he has worked most substantially on the television series Lois & Clark: The New Adventures of Superman and Monk. He also wrote the 2006 film Maybe It's in the Water, and two episodes of Midnight Caller.

Zisk was nominated for an Primetime Emmy Award, in 2005.

== Television credits ==
Numbers in directing and writing credits refer to number of episodes.

=== 1980s ===
Year	Title	Credited as		Network	Notes
Year	Title	Director	Producer	Network	Notes
1986–1987	Heart of the City	No	associate (13)	ABC	
1987	Hooperman	No	supervising (2)	ABC	Also, associate producer
1988–1991	Midnight Caller	Yes (2)	Yes (60)	NBC	Also, associate and co-producer

=== 1990s ===
Year	Title	Credited as		Network	Notes
Year	Title	Director	Producer	Network	Notes
1991	Sisters	Yes (2)	co-producer (1)	NBC	
1992	Reasonable Doubts	Yes (8)	Yes (44)	ABC	Writer: "Change of Plans"; Also, supervising producer
1992	Bodies of Evidence	Yes (1)	No	CBS	
1993–1995	Lois & Clark: The New Adventures of Superman	Yes (6)	co-executive (21)	ABC	Also, supervising producer
1995–1996	Charlie Grace	Yes (8)	co-executive (8)	ABC	
1996	High Incident	Yes (8)	No	ABC	
1996	L.A. Firefighters	Yes (1)	No	Fox	
1996	Millennium	Yes (1)	No	Fox	
1996	Chicago Hope	Yes (1)	No	CBS	
1996–1997	Murder One	Yes (3)	No	ABC	
1996–1997	NYPD Blue	Yes (2)	No	ABC	
1996–1997	Early Edition	Yes (3)	No	CBS	
1997	Soldier of Fortune, Inc.	Yes (1)	No	Syndication	
1997–1998	The Visitor	Yes (2)	co-executive (12)	Fox	
1997	EZ Streets	Yes (1)	No	CBS	
1998	Fantasy Island	Yes (1)	No	ABC	
1999	The Net	Yes (1)	No	USA Network	
1999	Mercy Point	Yes (1)	No	UPN	
1999	Legacy	Yes (1)	No	UPN	
1999–2002	Providence	Yes (3)	No	NBC	

=== 2000s ===
Year	Title	Credited as		Network	Notes
Year	Title	Director	Executive Producer	Network	Notes
2000	Felicity	Yes (1)	No	The WB	
2000	Opposite Sex	Yes (3)	Yes (8)	Fox	
2000	Gideon's Crossing	Yes	Yes (19)	ABC	
2001	The Agency	Yes (1)	No	CBS	
2001	Strong Medicine	Yes (1)	No	Lifetime	
2002	Glory Days	Yes (4)	co-executive (8)	The WB	
2002	Odyssey 5	Yes (2)	No	Space/Showtime	
2002–2009	Monk	Yes (35)	Yes (97)	USA Network	Co-executive (12 episodes)
2002–2006	Without a Trace	Yes (6)	No	CBS	
2002	American Dreams	Yes (4)	No	NBC	
2003	Mister Sterling	Yes (1)	No	NBC	
2003	John Doe	Yes (1)	No	Fox	
2003	Miss Match	Yes (1)	No	NBC	
2005	House M.D.	Yes (1)	No	Fox	
2005	Prison Break	Yes (1)	No	Fox	
2006	Conviction	Yes (1)	No	NBC	
2006–2012	Desperate Housewives	Yes (3)	No	ABC	
2007	Weeds	Yes (1)	No	Showtime	
2007–2010	Grey's Anatomy	Yes (4)	No	ABC	

=== 2010s ===
Year	Title	Credited as		Network	Notes
Year	Title	Director	Executive Producer	Network	Notes
2010–2011	Memphis Beat	Yes (2)	No	TNT	
2010–2013	The Glades	Yes (3)	No	A&E	
2011	Off the Map	Yes (5)	Yes (13)	ABC	
2011–2014	Rizzoli & Isles	Yes (5)	No	TNT	
2011–2014	The Mentalist	Yes (8)	No	CBS	
2011	Private Practice	Yes (1)	No	ABC	
2011–2012	Suburgatory	Yes (2)	No	ABC	
2012	GCB	Yes (1)	No	ABC	
2012–2013	Dallas	Yes (2)	No	TNT	
2012–2013	Revenge	Yes (3)	No	ABC	
2012	The Mob Doctor	Yes (1)	No	Fox	
2013–2015	Scandal	Yes (6)	No	ABC	
2013	Save Me	Yes (1)	No	NBC	
2013	Family Tools	Yes (1)	No	ABC	
2013	We Are Men	Yes (1)	No	CBS	Unaired episode only
2014	The Blacklist	Yes (1)	No	NBC	
2014	Reckless	Yes (1)	No	CBS	
2014	How to Get Away with Murder	Yes (1)	No	ABC	
2014	Madam Secretary	Yes (1)	No	CBS	
2015	Backstrom	Yes (1)	No	Fox	
2015	The Mysteries of Laura	Yes (2)	No	NBC	
2015	Battle Creek	Yes (2)	No	CBS	
2015–2017	Bones	Yes (7)	Yes (34)	Fox	
2015	Girlfriends' Guide to Divorce	Yes (1)	No	Bravo	
2017	NCIS: New Orleans	Yes (1)	No	CBS	
2017	Valor	Yes (1)	No	The CW	
2018	Code Black	Yes (1)	No	CBS	
2018	The Good Cop	Yes (3)	Yes (10)	Netflix	
2018–2020	Bull	Yes (2)	No	CBS	
2019	The Fix	Yes (1)	No	ABC	
2019	What/If	Yes (1)	No	Netflix	
2019	In the Dark	Yes (1)	No	The CW	
2019	Instinct	Yes (1)	No	CBS	
2019–2020	Almost Family	Yes (2)	Yes (7)	Fox	

=== 2020s ===
Year	Title	Credited as		Network	Notes
Year	Title	Director	Executive Producer	Network	Notes
2021	Walker	Yes (1)	No	The CW	
2021–2022	The Equalizer	Yes (5)	No	CBS	
2022	Good Sam	Yes (1)	No	CBS	
2022	Panhandle	Yes (1)	No	Roku	
2022	The Endgame	Yes (2)	Yes (9)	NBC	
2022	So Help Me Todd	Yes (1)	No	CBS	
2023	East New York	Yes (1)	No	CBS	
2023	Mr. Monk's Last Case: A Monk Movie	Yes	Yes	Peacock	TV movie
2025	Alert: Missing Persons Unit	Yes (1)	No	Fox	
2025	The Rainmaker	Yes (3)	No	USA Network	
2025-2026	Boston Blue	Yes (4)	co-executive (20)	CBS	
2026	Doc	Yes (1)	No	Fox	

== See also ==
- Notable alumni of St. Mark's School of Texas
