= Traylor Howard =

American actress (born 1966)

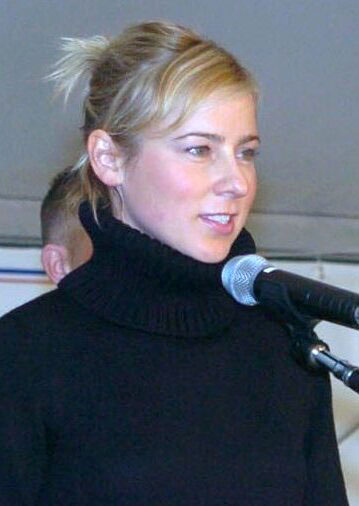
- Howard during a visit to Kandahar Airfield, Afghanistan, on December 19, 2005
- Born: Traylor Elizabeth Howard; June 14, 1966 (age 60); Orlando, Florida, U.S.
- Education: Lake Highland Preparatory School
- Alma mater: Florida State University
- Occupation: Actress
- Years active: 1991–present
- Spouses: Cameron B. Hall (m. 1990, divorced) Christian Navarro (m. 2003; div. 2005) Jarel Portman (m. 2011)
- Children: 2
- Relatives: John C. Portman Jr. (father-in-law)

Traylor Elizabeth Howard (born June 14, 1966) is an American actress. From 2005 to 2009, Howard played Natalie Teeger in the USA Network television series Monk. She has also starred on the sitcoms Boston Common (1996–1997) and Two Guys and a Girl (1998–2001), while her film credits include Dirty Work (1998), Me, Myself & Irene (2000), and Son of the Mask (2005).

== Early life ==
Traylor Elizabeth Howard was born on June 14, 1966, in Orlando, Florida, to Peggy (née Traylor) and Robert M. Howard, Jr. She is the middle of three children, with an older brother, John R. Howard, and a younger brother. She attended Lake Highland Preparatory School, and worked at SeaWorld Orlando as a teenager. After graduating from Florida State University with a degree in communications, advertising, and English, Howard moved to Los Angeles, California, where she worked for a public relations firm and a greeting card company while performing in local theater productions.

== Career ==
While in high school, Howard appeared in a Juicy Fruit chewing gum commercial. In 1994 she appeared in one of the AT&T Corporation's "You Will" television commercials.

Howard landed her first major television role in 1996 for the NBC sitcom Boston Common, portraying Joy Byrnes, a doctoral student and the love interest of Anthony Clark's Boyd Pritchett, throughout the show's two-season run. She later said she was "terrified" at appearing on a show which was broadcast between the top-rated sitcoms Seinfeld and Friends, and it took her about eight episodes to figure out that she was a straight man. Her hometown newspaper, The Orlando Sentinel, panned the show as "magna cum lousy."

From 1998 to 2001, Howard starred as Sharon Carter, the titular "girl" of the ABC sitcom Two Guys and a Girl (titled Two Guys, a Girl and a Pizza Place for the first two seasons), opposite Ryan Reynolds and Richard Ruccolo.

In 1998, Howard starred as the romantic lead in the film Dirty Work opposite Norm Macdonald.

In 2000, Howard appeared in the film Me, Myself & Irene as Charlie Baileygates's adulterous bride. She also featured in Foo Fighters' music video "Breakout", which served as a tie-in to the song's appearance in the film. That same year, Howard performed in the play How I Fell in Love by playwright Joel Field at the Williamstown Theater Festival in Williamstown, Massachusetts. It was reported that actor George Clooney visited Howard during her time at the festival.

In 2002, Howard starred in the short-lived sitcom Bram & Alice alongside Alfred Molina. That same year, she made a guest appearance in the third season of The West Wing.

In 2005, Howard starred in the film Son of the Mask.

From 2005 to 2009, Howard starred opposite Tony Shalhoub on the USA Network comedy-drama detective series Monk as the titular character's faithful assistant, Natalie Teeger. Following Monk's conclusion, Howard stepped back from acting to spend more time with her children.

Howard reprised her role as Natalie Teeger in Peacock's At-Home Variety Show short episode "Mr. Monk Shelters in Place" and Monk follow-up film Mr. Monk's Last Case: A Monk Movie, which were released on May 11, 2020, and December 8, 2023, respectively.

== Personal life ==
In 1991, Howard married Cameron B. Hall in Orlando, Florida. The couple then lived in Beverly Hills, California.

In April 2003, Howard married wine merchant Christian Navarro. The couple divorced in 2005.

In November 2006, Howard gave birth to a son.

In 2011, Howard married Jarel Portman, son of architect John C. Portman Jr. They have a son.

In July 2019, Howard was interviewed by Jane Mayer for a New Yorker piece detailing sexual misconduct allegations against former United States Senator Al Franken, with whom Howard performed on a USO tour in 2005. Howard defended Franken, saying, "I get the whole #MeToo thing, and a whole lot of horrible stuff has happened, and it needed to change. But that's not what was happening here. Franken is a good man."

== Filmography ==
=== Film ===
| Year | Film | Role | Notes |
|---|---|---|---|
| 1994 | Till the End of the Night | Fran | Credited as Traylor H. Hall |
| 1998 | Confessions of a Sexist Pig | Anne Henning | Alternative title: Taste of Love |
| 1998 | Dirty Work | Kathy | |
| 2000 | Me, Myself & Irene | Layla Baileygates | |
| 2005 | Son of the Mask | Tonya Avery | |
| 2016 | Simon Says Save the Climate! | Polar Bear | Voice |

=== Television ===
| Year | Title | Role | Notes |
|---|---|---|---|
| 1994 | Lois & Clark: The New Adventures of Superman | Dr. Heller's Office Temp | Episode: "Madame Ex" |
| 1996 | Buddies | Melissa | Uncredited |
| 1996–1997 | Boston Common | Joy Byrnes | 32 episodes |
| 1998–2001 | Two Guys and a Girl | Sharon Carter | 81 episodes |
| 2002 | The West Wing | Lisa Sherborne | Episode: "100,000 Airplanes" |
| 2002 | First Monday | Ashley Riverton | Episode: "Right to Die" |
| 2002 | The Division | Sarah Franzen | Episode: "Remembrance" |
| 2002 | Bram & Alice | Alice O'Connor | 8 episodes |
| 2005–2009 | Monk | Natalie Teeger | 87 episodes Gracie Allen Award for Outstanding Supporting Actress – Comedy Series (2009) |
| 2007 | Monk Webisodes | Natalie Teeger | Episode: "Mr. Monk Goes to the Gym" |
| 2010 | Nolan Knows Best | Julie Nolan | Pilot |
| 2020 | Peacock Presents: The At-Home Variety Show Featuring Seth MacFarlane | Natalie Teeger | Episode: "Mr. Monk Shelters in Place" |
| 2023 | Mr. Monk's Last Case: A Monk Movie | Natalie Teeger | TV movie |

=== Stage ===
| Year | Title | Role | Venue |
|---|---|---|---|
| 2000 | How I Fell In Love | Nessa | Williamstown Theater Festival |

=== Music video ===
| Year | Title | Role | Notes |
|---|---|---|---|
| 2000 | Foo Fighters – "Breakout" | Herself | |
