= List of Monk cast members =

For more detailed character information, see List of Monk characters.

Below is a list of actors and actresses that were part of the cast of the American comedy-drama television series Monk.

The show's main stars included, at some point, Tony Shalhoub, Bitty Schram, Traylor Howard, Ted Levine, and Jason Gray-Stanford. Stanley Kamel, Kane Ritchotte, and Stellina Rusich were credited as starring in the pilot episode, while Brooke Adams was credited as starring in "Mr. Monk and the Airplane".

== Cast ==
= Starring
= Recurring/Guest
= Archive footage or voiceovers

Character	Season							
Character	Season One (2002)	Season Two (2003–2004)	Season Three (2004–2005)	Season Four (2005–2006)	Season Five (2006–2007)	Season Six (2007–2008)	Season Seven (2008–2009)	Season Eight (2009)
=== Main cast ===
Adrian Monk	Tony Shalhoub	Tony Shalhoub	Tony Shalhoub	Tony Shalhoub	Tony Shalhoub	Tony Shalhoub	Tony Shalhoub	Tony Shalhoub
Sharona Fleming	Bitty Schram	Bitty Schram	Bitty Schram					Bitty Schram
Lt. Randy Disher	Jason Gray-Stanford	Jason Gray-Stanford	Jason Gray-Stanford	Jason Gray-Stanford	Jason Gray-Stanford	Jason Gray-Stanford	Jason Gray-Stanford	Jason Gray-Stanford
Captain Leland Stottlemeyer	Ted Levine	Ted Levine	Ted Levine	Ted Levine	Ted Levine	Ted Levine	Ted Levine	Ted Levine
Natalie Teeger			Traylor Howard	Traylor Howard	Traylor Howard	Traylor Howard	Traylor Howard	Traylor Howard
=== Family and friends ===
Dr. Charles Kroger	Stanley Kamel	Stanley Kamel	Stanley Kamel	Stanley Kamel	Stanley Kamel	Stanley Kamel		Stanley Kamel
Benjy Fleming	Kane Ritchotte; Max Morrow	Kane Ritchotte	Kane Ritchotte					
Trudy Monk	Stellina Rusich	Stellina Rusich	Melora Hardin	Melora Hardin	Melora Hardin; Lindy Newton	Melora Hardin	Melora Hardin	Melora Hardin
Gail Fleming	Amy Sedaris	Amy Sedaris						
Karen Stottlemeyer		Glenne Headly	Glenne Headly	Glenne Headly				
Jared Stottlemeyer		Cameron Cush; Jesse James			Jon Kyle Hansen			Unknown
Max Stottlemeyer		Connor Carmody						Unknown
Trevor Howe		Frank John Hughes	David Lee Russek					
Kevin Dorfman		Jarrad Paul	Jarrad Paul	Jarrad Paul	Jarrad Paul		Jarrad Paul	Jarrad Paul
Ambrose Monk		John Turturro		John Turturro			John Turturro	John Turturro
Marci Maven		Sarah Silverman				Sarah Silverman	Sarah Silverman	
Harold Krenshaw			Tim Bagley		Tim Bagley	Tim Bagley	Tim Bagley	Tim Bagley
Julie Teeger			Emmy Clarke	Emmy Clarke	Emmy Clarke	Emmy Clarke	Emmy Clarke	Emmy Clarke
Bobby Davenport				Michael Cavanaugh	Michael Cavanaugh			
Peggy Davenport				Holland Taylor	Holland Taylor			
Troy Kroger					Cody McMains	Cody McMains		
Jack Monk, Sr.					Dan Hedaya			Dan Hedaya
Dr. Neven Bell							Héctor Elizondo	Héctor Elizondo
Lt. Steven Albright							Casper Van Dien	Casper Van Dien
Trudy "T.K." Jensen-Stottlemeyer								Virginia Madsen
=== Enemies ===
Dale "The Whale" Biederbeck	Adam Arkin	Tim Curry				Ray Porter		
Gordo the M.E.			Scott Adsit	Scott Adsit				
Linda Fusco					Sharon Lawrence	Sharon Lawrence		
Hal Tucker					Andy Richter		Andy Richter	
Jimmy Belmont					Ricardo Chavira		Ricardo Chavira	
Arlene Boras						Angela Kinsey	Angela Kinsey	
Joey Krenshaw						David Koechner	David Koechner	
Ralph "Father" Roberts						Howie Mandel	Howie Mandel	
Sheriff John Rollins						Scott Glenn		
Frank Nunn						Courtney Gains		
Judge Ethan Rickover								Craig T. Nelson
=== Minor characters ===
Various Characters	Brooke Adams		Brooke Adams		Brooke Adams		Brooke Adams	Brooke Adams
Various Characters		Michael Shalhoub		Michael Shalhoub				Michael Shalhoub
Agent Grooms		Josh Stamberg	Josh Stamberg					
Garrett Price			Larry Miller			Larry Miller		
Dr. Matthew Shuler								D. B. Woodside
