= List of awards and nominations received by Tony Shalhoub =

Tony Shalhoub awards and nominations
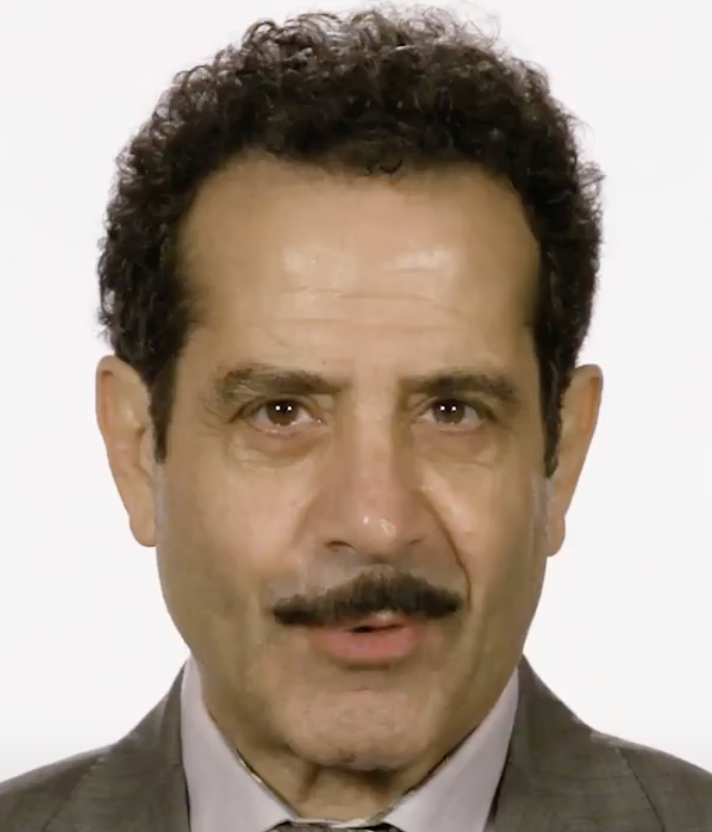
- Shalhoub in 2019
Awards and nominations
Award	Wins	Nominations
Primetime Emmy Awards	4	13
Daytime Emmy Awards	1	1
Golden Globe Awards	1	6
Grammy Awards	0	1
Screen Actors Guild Awards	6	12
Tony Awards	1	4

Totals (Note: Certain award groups do not simply award one winner. They acknowledge several different recipients, have runners-up, and have third place. Since this is a specific recognition and is different from losing an award, runner-up mentions are considered wins in this award tally. For simplification and to avoid errors, each award in this list has been presumed to have had a prior nomination.)
- Wins: 16
- Nominations: 56

This article is a list of awards and nominations received by Tony Shalhoub.

Tony Shalhoub is an American actor, and has won four Primetime Emmy Awards, a Daytime Emmy Award, a Golden Globe Award, six Screen Actors Guild Awards and a Tony Award as well as nominations for a Grammy Award and two Critics' Choice Television Awards.

Shalhoub earned popularity for his performance as Adrian Monk in the USA Network comedy-drama detective series Monk which ran from 2002 to 2009. The role earned him three Primetime Emmy Awards for Outstanding Lead Actor in a Comedy Series, a Golden Globe Award for Best Actor – Television Series Musical or Comedy and two Screen Actors Guild Award for Outstanding Performance by a Male Actor in a Comedy Series. He received critical acclaim for his role as Abe Weissman in the Amazon Prime Video comedy series The Marvelous Mrs. Maisel from 2017 to 2023. He received a Primetime Emmy Award for Outstanding Supporting Actor in a Comedy Series, and two Screen Actors Guild Awards for Outstanding Performance by a Male Actor in a Comedy Series as well as a nomination for a Critics' Choice Television Award.

For his roles on the Broadway stage, he received the Tony Award for Best Actor in a Musical for his performance as Tewfiq Zakaria in The Band's Visit (2018). He was Tony-nominated for playing Charlie in the Herb Gardner play Conversations with My Father (2000), Mr. Bonaparte in the Clifford Odets revival Golden Boy (2013), and duals roles of Moss Hart / Barnett Hart / George S. Kaufman in the James Lapine play Act One (2014).

== Major awards ==
=== Emmy Awards ===
Year	Category	Nominated work	Result	Ref.
Primetime Emmy Awards
2003	Outstanding Lead Actor in a Comedy Series	Monk (Episode: "Mr. Monk and the Airplane")	Won	
2004	Outstanding Lead Actor in a Comedy Series	Monk (Episode: "Mr. Monk Goes to the Theatre")	Nominated	
2005	Outstanding Lead Actor in a Comedy Series	Monk (Episode: "Mr. Monk Takes His Medicine")	Won	
2006	Outstanding Lead Actor in a Comedy Series	Monk (Episode: "Mr. Monk Bumps His Head")	Won	
2007	Outstanding Lead Actor in a Comedy Series	Monk (Episode: "Mr. Monk Gets a New Shrink")	Nominated	
2008	Outstanding Lead Actor in a Comedy Series	Monk (Episode: "Mr. Monk and the Named Man")	Nominated	
2009	Outstanding Lead Actor in a Comedy Series	Monk (Episode: "Mr. Monk and the Miracle")	Nominated	
2010	Outstanding Lead Actor in a Comedy Series	Monk (Episode: "Mr. Monk and the End")	Nominated	
2018	Outstanding Supporting Actor in a Comedy Series	The Marvelous Mrs. Maisel (Episode: "Thank You and Good Night")	Nominated	
2019	Outstanding Supporting Actor in a Comedy Series	The Marvelous Mrs. Maisel (Episode: "We're Going to the Catskills!")	Won	
2020	Outstanding Supporting Actor in a Comedy Series	The Marvelous Mrs. Maisel (Episode: "Marvelous Radio")	Nominated	
2022	Outstanding Supporting Actor in a Comedy Series	The Marvelous Mrs. Maisel (Episode: "Everything Is Bellmore")	Nominated	
2024	Outstanding Television Movie	Mr. Monk's Last Case: A Monk Movie (as Executive Producer)	Nominated	
Daytime Emmy Awards
2019	Outstanding Musical Performance in a Daytime Program	The Band's Visit on The Today Show (Note: Shared with Katrina Lenk, John Cariani, Ari'el Stachel, George Abud, Etai Benson, Adam Kantor, Andrew Polk, Bill Army, Rachel Prather, Jonathan Raviv, Sharone Sayegh, Kristen Sieh, Alok Tewari, Ossama Farouk, Sam Sadigursky, Harvey Valdes, and Garo Yellin.)	Won	

=== Golden Globe Awards ===
Year	Category	Nominated work	Result	Ref.
2002	Best Actor in a Television Series – Musical or Comedy	Monk (season 1)	Won	
2003	Best Television Series – Musical or Comedy (as a producer)	Monk (season 2)	Nominated	
2003	Best Actor in a Television Series – Musical or Comedy	Monk (season 2)	Nominated	
2004	Best Actor in a Television Series – Musical or Comedy	Monk (season 3)	Nominated	
2006	Best Actor in a Television Series – Musical or Comedy	Monk (season 4)	Nominated	
2008	Best Actor in a Television Series – Musical or Comedy	Monk (season 6)	Nominated	

=== Grammy Awards ===
Year	Category	Nominated work	Result	Ref.
2009	Best Spoken Word Album for Children	The Cricket in Times Square	Nominated	

=== Screen Actors Guild Awards ===
Year	Category	Nominated work	Result	Ref.
2002	Outstanding Male Actor in a Comedy Series	Monk (season 1)	Nominated	
2003	Outstanding Male Actor in a Comedy Series	Monk (season 2)	Won	
2004	Outstanding Male Actor in a Comedy Series	Monk (season 3)	Won	
2006	Outstanding Male Actor in a Comedy Series	Monk (season 4)	Nominated	
2007	Outstanding Male Actor in a Comedy Series	Monk (season 5)	Nominated	
2008	Outstanding Male Actor in a Comedy Series	Monk (season 6)	Nominated	
2009	Outstanding Male Actor in a Comedy Series	Monk (season 7)	Nominated	
2018	Outstanding Male Actor in a Comedy Series	The Marvelous Mrs. Maisel (season 1)	Won	
2018	Outstanding Ensemble in a Comedy Series	The Marvelous Mrs. Maisel (season 1)	Won	
2019	Outstanding Ensemble in a Comedy Series	The Marvelous Mrs. Maisel (season 2)	Won	
2019	Outstanding Male Actor in a Comedy Series	The Marvelous Mrs. Maisel (season 2)	Won	
2023	Outstanding Male Actor in a Television Movie or Limited Series	Mr. Monk's Last Case: A Monk Movie	Nominated	

=== Tony Awards ===
Year	Category	Nominated work	Result	Ref.
1992	Best Featured Actor in a Play	Conversations with My Father	Nominated	
2013	Best Featured Actor in a Play	Golden Boy	Nominated	
2014	Best Leading Actor in a Play	Act One	Nominated	
2018	Best Leading Actor in a Musical	The Band's Visit	Won	

== Miscellaneous awards ==
=== American Film Institute Awards ===
Year	Category	Nominated work	Result	Ref.
2001	Featured Actor of the Year – Male – Movies	The Man Who Wasn't There	Nominated	

=== Audie Awards ===
Year	Category	Nominated work	Result	Ref.
2009	Children's Title for Ages Eight and Up	The Cricket in Times Square	Nominated	

=== Chicago Film Critics Association Awards ===
Year	Category	Nominated work	Result	Ref.
2001	Best Supporting Actor	The Man Who Wasn't There	Nominated	

=== Chlotrudis Awards ===
Year	Category	Nominated work	Result	Ref.
1996	Best Actor	Big Night	Nominated	

=== Critics' Choice Television Awards ===
Year	Category	Nominated work	Result	Ref.
2018	Best Supporting Actor in a Comedy Series	The Marvelous Mrs. Maisel	Nominated	
2023	Best Actor in a Limited Series or Movie Made for Television	Mr. Monk's Last Case: A Monk Movie	Nominated	

=== Drama Desk Awards ===
Year	Category	Nominated work	Result	Ref.
2013	Outstanding Featured Actor in a Play	Golden Boy	Nominated	

=== Drama League Awards ===
Year	Category	Nominated work	Result	Ref.
2018	Distinguished Performance	The Band's Visit	Nominated	

=== Independent Spirit Awards ===
Year	Category	Nominated work	Result	Ref.
1996	Best Male Lead	Big Night	Nominated	

=== Monte-Carlo Television Festival ===
Year	Category	Nominated work	Result	Ref.
2018	Outstanding Actor in a Comedy TV Series	The Marvelous Mrs. Maisel	Won	

=== National Society of Film Critics Awards ===
Year	Category	Nominated work	Result	Ref.
1996	Best Supporting Actor	Big Night	Won (Note: Tied with Martin Donovan for The Portrait of a Lady.)	

=== New York Film Critics Circle Awards ===
Year	Category	Nominated work	Result	Ref.
1996	Best Supporting Actor	Big Night	Runner-up	

=== Online Film & Television Association Awards ===
Year	Category	Nominated work	Result	Ref.
2003	Best Actor in a Comedy Series	Monk	Won	
2004	Best Actor in a Comedy Series	Monk	Nominated	
2006	Best Actor in a Comedy Series	Monk	Nominated	
2018	Best Supporting Actor in a Comedy Series	The Marvelous Mrs. Maisel	Nominated	
2019	Best Supporting Actor in a Comedy Series	The Marvelous Mrs. Maisel	Runner-up	
2020	Best Supporting Actor in a Comedy Series	The Marvelous Mrs. Maisel	Nominated	

=== PRISM Awards ===
Year	Category	Work	Result	Ref.
2007	Outstanding Actor in a Comedy Series	Monk	Nominated	
2010	Outstanding Actor in a Comedy Series	Monk	Won	

=== Online Film Critics Society Awards ===
Year	Category	Nominated work	Result	Ref.
2001	Best Supporting Actor	The Man Who Wasn't There	Nominated	

=== Satellite Awards ===
Year	Category	Nominated work	Result	Ref.
2003	Best Actor in a Television Series – Musical or Comedy	Monk	Nominated	
2005	Best Actor in a Television Series – Musical or Comedy	Monk	Nominated	
2019	Best Supporting Actor – Series, Miniseries or Television Film	The Marvelous Mrs. Maisel	Nominated	

=== Television Critics Association Awards ===
Year	Category	Nominated work	Result	Ref.
2003	Individual Achievement in Comedy	Monk	Nominated	
