= Monk season 1 =

Monk
- Season 1
- DVD cover
- Starring: Tony Shalhoub Bitty Schram Ted Levine Jason Gray-Stanford
- No. of episodes: 13

Release
- Original network: USA Network
- Original release: July 12 – October 18, 2002

Season chronology
- Next → Season 2

The first season of Monk originally aired in the United States on USA Network from July 12 to October 18, 2002, which consisted of 13 episodes. Tony Shalhoub, Bitty Schram, Ted Levine, and Jason Gray-Stanford were introduced as portraying the main characters. Tony Shalhoub portrayed Adrian Monk, the title character, an OCD homicide detective from San Francisco, who was removed from the force after the murder of his wife. A DVD of the season was released on June 15, 2003.

== Crew ==
David Hoberman was the first to sign on to the ABC project, pitching a show about a "cop with obsessive-compulsive disorder." He then invited Andy Breckman to become the show's creator; Breckman accepted the offer, and would ultimately serve as the showrunner of Monk throughout its entire eight-season run. Breckman wrote a script for the pilot episode, which he called "Mr. Monk and the Candidate". It was originally to be an hour-long pilot, but due to lead actor Tony Shalhoub's prior contract limitations, it was forced to become a feature-length made-for-TV movie (Shalhoub's prior contract was subsequently cancelled, which gave him the freedom to join Monk). Dean Parisot was selected to direct the pilot episode. He would not return to the series until the final season, for "Mr. Monk and the Badge". Various other directors were hired for the subsequent episodes, including Randall Zisk and Adam Arkin. Writers for the season included Tom Scharpling, David Breckman, and Hy Conrad, among others. Conrad was nominated for an Edgar Award for his work on "Mr. Monk Takes a Vacation". Jeff Beal was hired to write the theme song, for which he won an Emmy.

== Cast ==
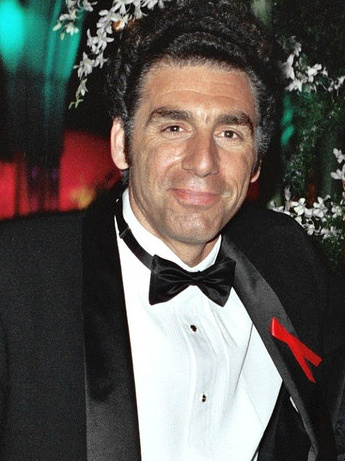
Michael Richards, originally considered for the role of Adrian Monk

Casting for the show began as early as 1998, when Monk was being developed for ABC. By the time Tony Shalhoub was finally chosen for the role of Adrian Monk, USA Network had taken over the project, and several prominent actors had been considered for the part. Such actors included Dave Foley, John Ritter, Henry Winkler, Stanley Tucci, Alfred Molina, and, most seriously, Michael Richards. Tucci and Molina would later go on to guest star in the series in "Mr. Monk and the Actor" and "Mr. Monk and the Naked Man", respectively. David Hoberman, executive producer of the show, stated, "I can't express how depressing those casting sessions were." He went on to say that "we had people coming in doing tics and Tourette's syndrome." Eventually, however, Shalhoub was given the part of the obsessive-compulsive detective.

The role of Sharona Fleming was also difficult to cast. In the story notes, her character was described as "Sassy. Outspoken. No BS." Queen Latifah was one of the many actresses considered before Bitty Schram was given the part. Stottlemeyer (originally named Chief Rockwell) was much easier to cast, with Ted Levine being one of the earliest choices for the sometimes-annoyed but generally forgiving captain of the SFPD. Jason Gray-Stanford was cast in the pilot as Randy Deacon, a minor role. However, after production, Andy Breckman (the show's creator) is said to have pulled Gray-Stanford aside, where he asked if he would like to be a costar. Gray-Stanford said yes, and the role of Randy Disher, the oblivious but lovable SFPD lieutenant, was created. Breckman later stated "I couldn't have imagined doing it without him."

Stanley Kamel was given the recurring part of Monk's beloved psychiatrist, Dr. Charles Kroger. In the pilot episode, however, he was given a starring credit. Kane Ritchotte and Max Morrow were chosen to portray Benjy Fleming, Sharona's son, throughout several episodes. Amy Sedaris appeared as Sharona's sister Gail. Stellina Rusich, a Canadian actress, was given the part of Trudy Monk, Monk's wife, who was murdered in a car bomb five years before the series began. Rusich appeared in the pilot and one subsequent episode.

For the first appearance in the series of recurring villain "Dale the Whale", Adam Arkin played the part, which was later taken over by Tim Curry. Other prominent guest stars, many but not all Canadian, were chosen for the season, including Brooke Adams (Shalhoub's wife), Hrant Alianak, David Anderson, Ben Bass, John Bourgeois, Cameron Daddo, Jennifer Dale, Tim Daly, Maria del Mar, Polly Draper, Robin Duke, Fred Ewanuick, Michael Hogan, Rob LaBelle, Jenny Levine, Linda Kash, J. C. MacKenzie, Carl Marotte, Garry Marshall, Stephen McHattie, Kevin Nealon, Willie Nelson, Gail O'Grady, Peter Outerbridge, Christopher Shyer, and Jessica Steen.

== Episodes ==
No. overall	No. in season	Title	Directed by	Written by	Original release date	U.S. viewers (millions)
1	1	"Mr. Monk and the Candidate"	Dean Parisot	Andy Breckman	July 12, 2002	4.76
2	2	"Mr. Monk and the Candidate"	Dean Parisot	Andy Breckman	July 12, 2002	4.76
Adrian Monk, a widowed former San Francisco Police Department (SFPD) detective, comes out of forced retirement to investigate the murder of a politician's bodyguard and learns that there is more at play than meets the eye, especially after discovering secrets involving the candidate's wife (Gail O'Grady) and campaign manager (Ben Bass).: Note: Originally shown as a feature-length pilot TV movie, which was later cut into two separate episodes for syndication.
3	3	"Mr. Monk and the Psychic"	Kevin Inch	John Romano	July 19, 2002	4.06
When the wealthy wife (Linda Trotter) of the police commissioner (John Bourgeois) disappears, her body is mysteriously found by a phony psychic (Linda Kash). Everyone believes she accomplished the impossible–except for Monk, who provokes the commissioner into making a damning statement.
4	4	"Mr. Monk Meets Dale the Whale"	Rob Thompson	Andy Breckman	July 26, 2002	4.87
When a local judge is found murdered, all the evidence points to one man: an 800 lb (360 kg) reclusive tycoon named Dale "The Whale" Biederbeck (Adam Arkin). However, due to his extreme obesity, he is unable to leave his bed. However, Monk is sure that you do not have to commit a murder to be guilty of it.
5	5	"Mr. Monk Goes to the Carnival"	Randall Zisk	Siobhan Byrne	August 2, 2002	4.91
An amusement park ride turns deadly when Stottlemeyer's former partner (Stephen McHattie) gets on a Ferris wheel at the insistence of a mysterious informant. The informant screams that the policeman is trying to kill him. When the ride comes to a stop, the informant has a knife in his chest. The lieutenant, who has a history of police brutality, is suspended, and his testimony as the sole witness in an upcoming trial is discredited. Monk must find out how the murder could have been committed by someone else.
6	6	"Mr. Monk Goes to the Asylum"	Nick Marck	Tom Scharpling and David Breckman	August 9, 2002	4.48
After Monk goes to Trudy's old house without realizing his error, he is temporarily institutionalized for observation. Inside, he stumbles upon a four-year-old murder and believes the patient accused of the crime (who supposedly committed suicide immediately after the murder) was framed. Along the way, Monk is aided by various other patients at the hospital, including a man (Kevin Nealon) who mirrors those around him, a woman who gets angry easily and lashes out at people and a man who is obsessed with Santa Claus. Also stars Dennis Boutsikaris and Eve Gordon.
7	7	"Mr. Monk and the Billionaire Mugger"	Stephen Cragg	Timothy J. Lea	August 16, 2002	4.46
A billionaire computer mogul is shot dead while mugging a couple outside a movie theater, and a uniformed officer later is seen fleeing the scene. While the press hound the police about the identity of "Fraidy Cop", Monk investigates what at first appears to be a midlife crisis gone horribly wrong—until he finds out that the two cases are connected.
8	8	"Mr. Monk and the Other Woman"	Adam Arkin	David M. Stern	August 23, 2002	3.70
Monk's dedication to his late wife is tested when he meets a beautiful woman (Maria del Mar) while investigating the murders of a lawyer and his secretary, and she develops a fascination with him. But when the prime suspect is murdered in the woman's house, Monk is forced to consider the possibility that she's not as innocent as she seems.
9	9	"Mr. Monk and the Marathon Man"	Adam Davidson	Mitch Markowitz	September 13, 2002	4.86
Convinced that a local furniture magnate threw his young mistress off her apartment balcony, Monk faces the task of trying to break his perfect alibi - that he was across town running in a marathon at the time.
10	10	"Mr. Monk Takes a Vacation"	Kevin Inch	Hy Conrad	September 20, 2002	N/A
While Monk, Sharona, and Benjy are taking a week's vacation, Benjy witnesses a woman being murdered in a hotel room through a telescope. Aided by a security chief (Polly Draper) whose only experience with detective work comes from watching movies, Monk races to solve the case even as the evidence keeps disappearing.
11	11	"Mr. Monk and the Earthquake"	Adam Shankman	Tom Scharpling and David Breckman	October 4, 2002	N/A
When a San Francisco philanthropist dies mysteriously in a minor earthquake, Monk suspects the man's wife of foul play, and Sharona's life is soon in danger. Guest stars Amy Sedaris.
12	12	"Mr. Monk and the Red-Headed Stranger"	Milan Cheylov	Andy Breckman and Tom Scharpling	October 11, 2002	N/A
Country superstar Willie Nelson becomes the prime suspect in the shooting death of his scheming business manager, but Monk, a fan of Nelson (because his wife was), is convinced of his innocence and sets out to prove it.
13	13	"Mr. Monk and the Airplane"	Rob Thompson	David M. Stern	October 18, 2002	4.25
While flying across the country with Sharona, Monk becomes convinced that two of the other passengers have committed a murder and calls Lt. Disher to help investigate in San Francisco. He has to deal with his fear of flight, an irritated flight attendant (Brooke Adams), and a zealous extension cord salesman (Garry Marshall), while Sharona meets actor Tim Daly.

- A (HH) listed next to a viewership number indicates the number of household viewers, and a (25-54) indicates the number of viewers aged 25-54. These are only used if total viewership numbers were unavailable for that particular episode.

== Reception ==
The first season received positive reviews from critics. On Rotten Tomatoes, season 1 has an approval rating of 100% based on 15 reviews. The website's critical consensus reads, "Monk is a pedestrian procedural anchored by an extraordinary star performance, with Tony Shalhoub bringing both beguiling eccentricity and rich humanity to the titular detective." On Metacritic, the first season holds a 75 out of 100 based on 21 reviews, indicating "generally favorable" reviews.

== Awards and nominations ==
=== Emmy Awards ===
- Outstanding Actor – Comedy Series (Tony Shalhoub for playing "Adrian Monk")
- Outstanding Main Title Theme Music (Jeff Beal)

=== Golden Globe Awards ===
- Best Actor – Musical or Comedy Series (Tony Shalhoub for playing "Adrian Monk")
