= Mr. Monk and the Airplane =

- Monk episode
- Episode no.: Season 1 Episode 13
- Directed by: Rob Thompson
- Written by: David M. Stern
- Production code: #T-1111
- Original air date: October 18, 2002

Guest appearances
- Brooke Adams as Leigh Harrison; Tim Daly as Himself; Garry Marshall as Warren Beach; Carl Marotte as Stefan Chabrol; Jennifer Dale as Barbara Chabrol; Robin Duke as Aunt Minn

Episode chronology
| ← Previous "Mr. Monk and the Red-Headed Stranger" | Next → "Mr. Monk Goes Back to School" |
- Monk season 1

"Mr. Monk and the Airplane" is the first season finale of the American comedy-drama detective television series Monk, and the show's 13th episode overall. The series follows Adrian Monk (Tony Shalhoub), a private detective with obsessive–compulsive disorder and multiple phobias, and his assistant Sharona Fleming (Bitty Schram). In this episode, Monk is obligated to fly with Sharona and is faced with a murder case on the airplane.

The episode was written by David M. Stern and directed by Rob Thompson. It guest starred several actors, including Brooke Adams, Tim Daly, and Garry Marshall. When the episode first aired in the United States on USA Network on October 18, 2002, it was watched by 4.2 million viewers. "Mr. Monk and the Airplane" was well received by critics, and earned Shalhoub a Primetime Emmy Award in 2003.

== Plot ==
Practical nurse Sharona Fleming (Bitty Schram) leaves to fly to New Jersey to visit her aunt. Her client and detective Adrian Monk (Tony Shalhoub) is forced to go with her, as he fears not being able to live without Sharona. While at San Francisco International Airport, a woman named Barbara Chabrol (Jennifer Dale) stands on her toes to kiss her husband Stefan (Carl Marotte).

Aboard the plane, an annoying extension cord salesman named Warren Beach (Garry Marshall) does little to assuage Monk's fears. Monk quickly becomes suspicious of Stefan Chabrol after he notices that Barbara no longer needs to stand on her toes to kiss him, has "forgotten" that she ordered the vegetarian meal, knows nothing about air travel despite a frequent-flyer lapel, and claims to have "forgotten how to" speak French when an old family friend, Bernard, meets them on board. More digging convinces Monk he is on to something. Monk quickly annoys everyone and a fellow passenger informs Stefan of Monk's suspicions.

Meanwhile, Bernard appears dead, probably because of a heart attack but Monk cannot guarantee it. So Monk asks Sharona to steal Bernard's wine glass and, with a lighter borrowed from Beach, proceeds to burn away the wine to reveal a mysterious liquid at the bottom. However, the flight attendant, Leigh Harrison (Brooke Adams), is alerted to Monk's use of a lighter on board, and confiscates both the lighter and the glass, dumping the liquid down the sink.

Monk calls Lieutenant Disher and explains what he thinks happened. Stefan and his mistress murdered Barbara and the mistress disguised herself as Barbara. Stefan, being a pilot, then used his valid identification card and its virtually unlimited access to hide the body at a construction site at the airport. The construction workers poured concrete over the corpse, unwittingly destroying the evidence.

When Monk and Sharona's flight lands at Newark Liberty International Airport, Monk stalls Stefan's connecting flight to Paris by wittingly saying that the captain of the Paris flight is drunk. This allows Disher and the construction crew to excavate and find the body. The Newark Police Department shows up, and Stefan and his mistress are led away in handcuffs.

== Production ==
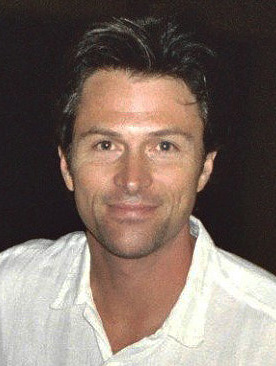
Shalhoub's former Wings co-star Tim Daly guest starred as himself

"Mr. Monk and the Airplane" was written by David M. Stern and directed by Rob Thompson. Both were credited for the second time in the series, as Stern previously worked on "Mr. Monk and the Other Woman" and Thompson on "Mr. Monk Meets Dale the Whale". There were various discussions between series creator Andy Breckman and writer Tom Scharpling with USA Network's producers over the setting for the episode. The network required to have only half of the scenes on the plane, but the writing staff wanted it to be completely set on the plane. There was also discussion over the repetition of a "Pete and Repeat" joke; ultimately, USA's executives "were crying from laughing so hard" and agreed to include the scene.

Tim Daly guest starred as himself; he and Tony Shalhoub were in the NBC TV show Wings. To further explore the in-joke of his casting, Monk's comment about Wings—"Never saw it. Was it good?"—was added. Another guest star, Garry Marshall himself created Warren Beach's trademark line—"If it doesn't reach, call Warren Beach"—as he was allowed to improvise; Breckman further stated, "He was improvising all the way". Marshall appeared in the episode after telling Monk's producer David Hoberman that it was his wife's favorite show. Brooke Adams, the real-life wife of Shalhoub, also starred in this episode as the flight attendant Leigh. Breckman appeared as the passenger who enters the plane just ahead of Monk and Sharona, just as his credit as executive producer appears on screen.

== Reception ==
"Mr. Monk and the Airplane" was first broadcast in the United States on the USA Network at 10 pm EST on October 18, 2002. According to Nielsen Media Research, the episode was viewed by an estimated number of 4.25 million viewers with a 2.5 household rating.

Jason Gray-Stanford listed "Mr. Monk and the Airplane" among his three favorite episodes of the series. Moreover, it was positively received by critics. In The Futon Critic's ranking of the fifty best episodes of 2002, it was placed 32nd, with Brian Ford Sullivan stating, "The title of the episode says it all for us." New York Daily News's David Bianculli declared "It seems that lots of people are getting on board with Monk, which is as it should be", referring to the guest stars of the episode. The guests were said to be one of the "many subtle and silly pleasures" of the episode by Kevin McDonough, a critic for the United Feature Syndicate, while a TelevisionWeek reviewer praised Marshall's performance as a "tour de force guest shot". Austin Smith of the New York Post deemed it "a true classic" and said it put "Mr. Monk Takes Manhattan" "to shame". Chris Hicks from Deseret News qualified it as "perfection," and Bianculli stressed "the writing team for Monk made the most" of it. On the other hand, Joy Press of The Village Voice called it "a Seinfeld-like device" in which Monk's fear of flying was explored "to the point of exhaustion."

At the 55th Primetime Emmy Awards, Shalhoub won a Primetime Emmy Award for Outstanding Lead Actor in a Comedy Series for this episode.
