= Mr. Monk and the Three Pies =

- Monk episode
- Episode no.: Season 2 Episode 11
- Directed by: Randall Zisk
- Written by: Tom Scharpling; Daniel Dratch
- Production code: #T-1412
- Original air date: January 23, 2004

Guest appearances
- John Turturro as Ambrose Monk; Holt McCallany as Pat van Ranken; Leslie Jordan as the Town Official; Marcia Ann Burrs as Gladys Dohan; Crystal Santos as Rita van Ranken

Episode chronology
← Previous "Mr. Monk and the Paperboy"	Next → "Mr. Monk and the TV Star"
- Monk (season 2)

"Mr. Monk and the Three Pies" is the eleventh episode of the second season of the American comedy-drama detective television series Monk, and the show's 24th episode overall. The series follows Adrian Monk (Tony Shalhoub), a private detective with obsessive–compulsive disorder and multiple phobias, and his assistant Sharona Fleming (Bitty Schram). In this episode, Monk's brother, Ambrose, is introduced to the series and requests Monk to investigate his neighbor, whom he suspects of murder.

The episode was written by Tom Scharpling and Daniel Dratch, and directed by Randall Zisk. It guest starred John Turturro, who accepted to play Ambrose after Shalhoub's invitation. When the episode first aired in the United States on the USA Network on January 23, 2004, it was watched by 5.9 million viewers. "Mr. Monk and the Three Pies" was generally well received by critics, with most of the praise regarding Turturro's performance. It also led Turturro to win an Emmy Award for Outstanding Guest Actor in a Comedy Series.

== Plot ==
At a fair in Tewkesbury, a woman wins a cherry pie, and Pat van Ranken (Holt McCallany) kills her and steals her car. While Captain Stottlemeyer (Ted Levine) dismisses it as a carjacking gone wrong, Adrian Monk (Tony Shalhoub) remains suspicious. Later, Sharona Fleming (Bitty Schram) gets a call from Monk's brother Ambrose (John Turturro), an agoraphobic who has not left his house for thirty-two years. The brothers have not spoken for seven years—Adrian is angry at Ambrose because he never called or wrote after Adrian's wife Trudy died. Ambrose calls Adrian, as he suspects his neighbor, van Ranken, of murdering his wife, Rita (Crystal Santos). Ambrose heard gunshots and noticed van Ranken was gone all night. When asked, van Ranken said Rita had flown to Argentina and that his truck was broken. However, Adrian notices the truck has been moved recently.

Adrian and Sharona visit van Ranken, on the pretext of taking back a bag of flour that Rita borrowed from Ambrose, and van Ranken lies about his wife's whereabouts. The next day, van Ranken deliberately finishes second in an event so as to win another cherry pie, and Adrian and Sharona see him rooting through it. Ambrose remembers that Rita baked three cherry pies to give away at the fair, deducing that there must be something in one of them worth killing for. Though skeptical, Stottlemeyer admits there was no pie in the car when the police got there. However, the airline records confirm that Rita boarded a plane to Argentina on the night of the murder. The next day, Adrian and Sharona track van Ranken back to the fair again, and he wins the third pie.

Adrian explains that while van Ranken was disposing of his wife's corpse, a woman arrived to collect the pies. Van Ranken realized that one of the shell casings from his gun was nowhere to be found, believing it landed in one of the pies. This convinces Stottlemeyer to search the third pie, but nothing is found inside it. Later, over dinner with Ambrose, Adrian berates him for not calling after Trudy died, and Ambrose, taken aback, says the reason he did not call was because he felt guilty: Trudy was running an errand to get cough medicine for him when she was killed, and he blames himself. He breaks down crying, and Adrian, shocked, tells him it was not his fault and embraces him.

Later, Adrian and van Ranken each separately reenact the murder, simultaneously realizing that the shell casing is in the bag of flour in Ambrose's house. Adrian and Sharona race to Tewkesbury, realizing that Ambrose is in danger. Van Ranken tries to get the flour back, but Ambrose sees through his ruse. He locks the door, so van Ranken sets the house on fire. While Sharona calls the fire department, Adrian rushes inside and pulls Ambrose to safety. Meanwhile, Stottlemeyer and Lieutenant Disher (Jason Gray-Stanford) arrest van Ranken; they just found Rita's body, and the "Rita van Ranken" who flew to Argentina is actually his girlfriend. Ambrose gives Stottlemeyer the last shell casing, having found it in the flour, and the reconciled brothers visit Trudy's grave.

== Production ==
"Mr. Monk and the Three Pies" was co-written by Tom Scharpling and Daniel Dratch, and directed by Randall Zisk. The episode guest starred John Turturro as Ambrose Monk. Shalhoub and Turturro, "longtime friends", according to USA Today, had graduated from Yale School of Drama. They had previously worked on the 1991 film Barton Fink and in a 1998 off-Broadway production of the play Waiting for Godot. Shalhoub also lived with the Turturros while working on an East Coast project. Turturro was also encouraged to the take the role by his family; he declared, "My whole family likes the show. My (13-year-old) son likes the show."

While Shalhoub noted "Monk shows more emotion than usual because of the family tie", he also remarked the fact that he is angry with his brother was a good way to show "a whole other part of [Adrian]. He's more abrupt and less sympathetic. It's a healthy thing to see that he's not a complete saint." Turturro, by his turn, said "The [episode's] tone is oddly touching. It's hard to find the right tone. Tony does a great job of that, mixing comedy and drama". Shalhoub was "really gratified" for Turturro's performance, while Turturro called the episode "a pleasure" to do. Responding to a question about the possible return of Ambrose, Shalhoub said Turturro would accept it, "especially if I don't have to have a complete emotional breakdown." He became a recurring character and returned for "Mr. Monk Goes Home Again" and "Mr. Monk's 100th Case".

== Reception ==
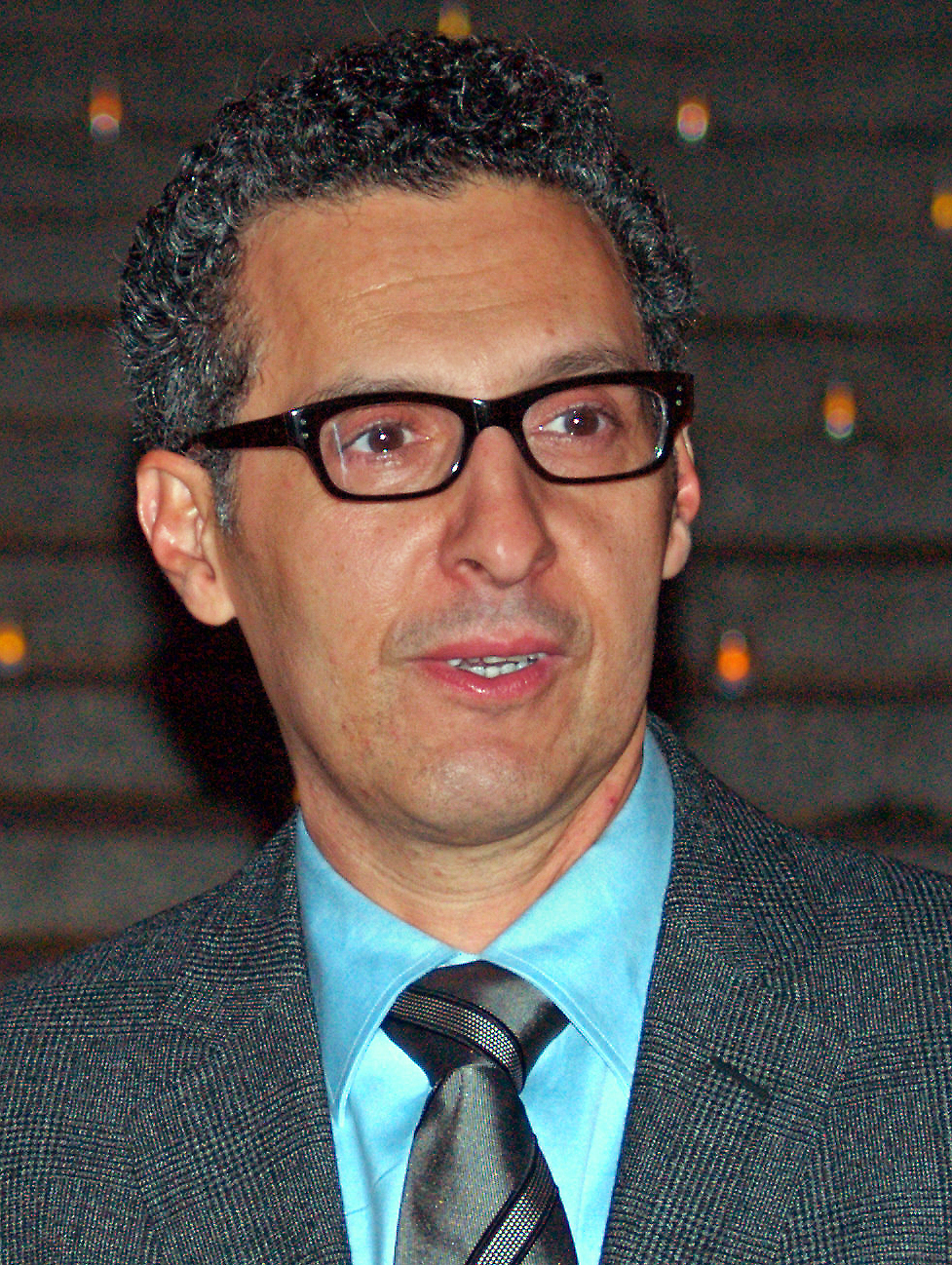
Turturro's guest starring in the episode was praised by critics, and led Turturro to win an Emmy Award for Outstanding Guest Actor in a Comedy Series.

"Mr. Monk and the Three Pies" was first broadcast in the United States on the USA Network at 10 pm EST on January 23, 2004. According to Nielsen Media Research, the episode was viewed by an estimated number of 5.9 million viewers and had a 4.5 household rating.

Shalhoub elected the episode among his favorites twice; he put it along with "Mr. Monk Takes His Medicine" and "Mr. Monk and the Garbage Strike" during the Monk Cast Favorites Marathon, and mentioned "Mr. Monk and the Three Pies", "Mr. Monk Takes His Medicine" and "Mr. Monk Is Someone Else" as his favorite ones as the end of the series. Schram also selected it to be her favorite episode, attributing the choice to dynamic between Shalhoub and Turturro.

DigitallyObsessed's reviewer Rich Rosell called it "one of the series' best-written episodes", remarking "Turturro and Shalhoub are excellent together". Jeffrey Robinson of DVD Talk appointed it as his "absolute favorite episode (of the entire series!)", saying Turturro side-by-side with Shalhoub is "stunning." Robinson added that Ambrose "makes Monk look like a normal person", saying of the story: "it's diabolically fun to watch these two neurotic brothers solve a murder mystery."

It was said that "the comedy here has more than a hint of pathos" by People, with the writer declaring "It's rare to see brothers portrayed so convincingly, particularly on a show in the field of light entertainment. But don't be afraid: The episode has moments that are funny, pure and simple." Writing for The Star-Ledger, Alan Sepinwall compared the murder that conducts the plot to Rear Window's plot; although stated that "Plot has never been the series' strong suit", he declared "this one's fun in its own right". The real reason to watch it, however, "is to see Shalhoub and Turturro get on each other's nerves, and to witness Monk revisiting his childhood home", according to Sepinwall. The Sydney Morning Herald's Michael Idato called Turturro "a great addition to the dynamic" and appreciated the possibility of his return later in the series.

At the 56th Primetime Emmy Awards, Turturro won the award for Outstanding Guest Actor in a Comedy Series for his acting as Ambrose on the episode.
