= Mr. Monk's Last Case: A Monk Movie =

2023 film by Randy Zisk

- Release poster
- Directed by: Randy Zisk
- Written by: Andy Breckman
- Produced by: Lena Cordina
- Starring: Tony Shalhoub; Traylor Howard; Jason Gray-Stanford; Melora Hardin; Héctor Elizondo; Ted Levine
- Cinematography: Giorgio Scali
- Edited by: Elliott Eisman
- Music by: Jeff Beal
- Production companies: Mandeville Films; Andy Breckman Productions; Universal Content Productions
- Distributed by: Peacock
- Release date: December 8, 2023
- Running time: 97 minutes
- Country: United States
- Language: English

Mr. Monk's Last Case: A Monk Movie is a 2023 American comedy mystery film directed by Randy Zisk. It is a sequel to the USA Network television series Monk, and was written by series creator Andy Breckman. Tony Shalhoub, Traylor Howard, Jason Gray-Stanford, and Ted Levine reprised their roles as the main characters from the show, while recurring actors Melora Hardin and Héctor Elizondo also appeared. Set twelve years after the series finale, the film follows Adrian Monk, a private detective with obsessive–compulsive disorder and multiple phobias, who comes out of retirement and reunites with his friends to solve a case involving his stepdaughter.

The film premiered on Peacock on December 8, 2023.

== Plot ==
Adrian Monk's obsessive-compulsive habits, which subsided after solving the murder of his wife Trudy, (Note: As depicted in "Mr. Monk and the End".) are reignited by the COVID-19 pandemic. (Note: As depicted in "Mr. Monk Shelters in Place".) After losing a book deal about his career as a private detective—the money from which he had hoped to use to fund his stepdaughter Molly Evans' wedding—Monk begins to contemplate ending his own life. Monk is reunited with his former assistant Natalie Teeger, now remarried and living in Atlanta, and Randy Disher, now Chief of Police of Summit, New Jersey, for Molly's wedding to journalist Griffin Briggs. Griffin is killed in an apparent bungee jumping accident after accusing billionaire Rick Eden of murdering his partner.

Molly goes to Monk for help and, after some reluctance, Monk decides to take the case. Molly reveals that she overheard someone saying that the rope was "six feet too long". Suspicious how someone would know that immediately, Molly adds that she noticed that the man who said it had white painted fingernails. Knowing that it is a habit for softball players, Randy locates the man, Lucas Kubrick, an employee of Eden. They further discover that someone had broke into Griffin's workshop, but nothing was missing.

Monk, Natalie, and Randy go to see Eden and learn that Leland Stottlemeyer is now the head of his security. When Monk confronts Eden over the allegations, Stottlemeyer restrains him, as he wants to keep his job, but Monk notices sticky notes in Eden's office. Soon after, Monk meets with the new head of homicide, Lisa Rudner, who wishes that he rejoin as a consultant, but he politely rebuffs her. Monk tries to speak to Kubrick, but he is told that they are unable to touch him as he has lawyered up. Meanwhile, Stottlemeyer gets security footage of Eden with Kubrick, supporting Monk's suspicions. Monk speaks with Dr. Bell, who reveals that he retired two months ago and was seeing him out of empathy, where he sees a newspaper clip about a dog shelter that had been threatened by a bomber. He recognizes the writing as Eden's from the sticky notes, and spots Kubrick on a delivery. Realizing that Eden plans to eliminate Kubrick, making it look like a failed bombing of the dog shelter, Monk and Natalie attempt to save him, but are too late.

Stottlemeyer, finally on Monk's side, reaffirms that Eden is "the guy" and has Monk sneak into Eden's party so that he can steal his laptop, which contains vital information. Disguised as a bartender, Monk is caught right away. Eden confesses, but he does not divulge how he murdered Griffin. Monk steals the laptop, but is chased by Eden who pushes him off the cliff. He is rescued. Molly asks him to give up his investigation, as she does not want to lose him too. Monk once again begins to think of suicide and heads to a funeral home to look at caskets. When he notices that twin directors have slightly different shaped heads, Monk solves the case.

Just as Eden is about to launch into orbit, Monk and the rest of the team arrive and stop the blastoff. Monk reveals what happened: Eden had done his research on Griffin, who always prepared his own bungee cord. Eden had Kubrick break into his workshop and replace Griffin's tape measure with one with the inches slightly off. Griffin measured his bungee cord with a bad tape measure, making it too long. Stottlemeyer happily quits, and Eden is placed under arrest for the murder of Griffin and his partner.

Monk returns to the park to prepare for his suicide, but is visited by the spirit of Trudy, who also brings Griffin and the numerous other people whom he helped. One of them is a woman whose case has not been solved yet. Realizing that he has made a difference, Molly gives Monk back his visitor's pass to get him into the precinct. Monk resumes life and decides to become a consultant again.

== Cast ==
- Tony Shalhoub as Adrian Monk
- Traylor Howard as Natalie Teeger
- Jason Gray-Stanford as Randy Disher
- Melora Hardin as Trudy Monk
- Héctor Elizondo as Neven Bell
- Ted Levine as Leland Stottlemeyer
- James Purefoy as Rick Eden
- Emma Ishta as Gayle Eden
- Caitlin McGee as Molly Evans (Note: Molly was previously played by Alona Tal in the series finale.)
- Austin Scott as Griffin Briggs
- Paulino Nunes as Lucas Kubrick
- Brooke Adams as Beth
- Richard Kind as the Funeral Directors

Additionally, Bitty Schram appears as Sharona Fleming via archival footage from the series' pilot episode.

== Production ==
In March 2023, Tony Shalhoub confirmed on Dr. Loubna Hassanieh's Unheard Stories: Stories That Inspire podcast that a 90-minute Monk film was in production. Soon after, Peacock announced the follow-up film, titled Mr. Monk's Last Case: A Monk Movie produced by Universal Content Productions. Original cast members Shalhoub, Ted Levine, Traylor Howard, Jason Gray-Stanford, Melora Hardin and Héctor Elizondo (who played Adrian Monk, Captain Leland Stottlemeyer, Natalie Teeger, Randy Disher, Trudy Monk, and Dr. Neven Bell, respectively) were confirmed to reprise their roles from the series, with creator Andy Breckman writing the script.

Principal photography took place in Toronto, Ontario from May 1 to May 30, 2023.

== Release ==
Mr. Monk's Last Case: A Monk Movie was released in the United States by Peacock on December 8, 2023. It was released on Region A Blu-ray by Kino Lorber on December 31, 2024, and in a box set with the entire original series on December 16, 2025.

== Reception ==
On the review aggregator website Rotten Tomatoes, 95% of 22 critics' reviews are positive, with an average rating of 7.1/10. The website's consensus reads: "Recapturing much of what made the series great without falling back on empty nostalgia, Mr. Monk's Last Case: A Monk Movie solves the mystery of how to pull off a satisfying revival." Metacritic, which uses a weighted average, assigned the film a score of 65 out of 100, based on 6 critics, indicating "generally favorable" reviews.

Robert Lloyd of the Los Angeles Times called the film a "longer-than-necessary version" of the television show but that "it's funny when it wants to be." Kelly Lawler of USA Today described the film as "a sweet-as-pie (but not too sweet) reunion that captures the tone and spirit of the original show but also feels apt for 2023".

=== Accolades ===
Award	Year	Category	Nominee(s)	Result	Ref.
Astra TV Awards	2024	Best TV Movie	Mr. Monk's Last Case: A Monk Movie	Nominated	
Astra TV Awards	2024	Best Actor in a Limited Series or TV Movie	Tony Shalhoub	Nominated	
Astra TV Awards	2024	Best Writing in a Limited Series or TV Movie	Andy Breckman	Nominated	
Critics' Choice Television Awards	2024	Best Movie/Miniseries	Mr. Monk's Last Case: A Monk Movie	Nominated	
Critics' Choice Television Awards	2024	Best Actor in a Movie/Miniseries	Tony Shalhoub	Nominated	
Golden Reel Award	2024	Outstanding Achievement in Sound Editing – Non-Theatrical Feature	Brent Findley, Dan Kremer, Dan Douglass, and Brian Staub	Nominated	
Primetime Emmy Awards	2024	Outstanding Television Movie	Randy Zisk, Tony Shalhoub, Andy Breckman, David Hoberman, and Lena Cordina	Nominated	
Producers Guild of America Awards	2024	Outstanding Producer of Streamed or Televised Motion Pictures	Mr. Monk's Last Case: A Monk Movie	Nominated	
Screen Actors Guild Awards	2024	Outstanding Performance by a Male Actor in a Television Movie or Limited Series	Tony Shalhoub	Nominated	
Writers Guild of America Awards	2024	TV & New Media Motion Pictures	Andy Breckman	Nominated	
