= Mr. Monk and the Candidate =

- Monk episodes
- After the death of his wife, Adrian Monk developed obsessive–compulsive disorder and multiple phobias. Monk's fear of heights allows Ian Sykes (left), the shooter, to slip past him on a ladder while escaping from the police.
- Episode nos.: Season 1 Episodes 1 & 2
- Directed by: Dean Parisot
- Written by: Andy Breckman
- Production code: #T-1100
- Original air date: July 12, 2002
- Running time: 79 minutes

Guest appearances
- Michael Hogan as Warren St. Claire; Michelle Addison as Nicole Vasquez; Ben Bass as Gavin Lloyd; Fred Ewanuick as Jake; Vincent Gale as Jesse Goodman; Dion Johnstone as Lt. Gitomer; Stanley Kamel as Charles Kroger; Rob LaBelle as Sheldon Burger; Gail O'Grady as Miranda St. Claire; Shawn Reis as Ian Sykes; Kane Ritchotte as Benjy Fleming; Stellina Rusich as Trudy Monk; John Sampson as Jason Rondstadt; Chris Shyer as Carl

Episode chronology
← Previous —	Next → "Mr. Monk and the Psychic"
- Monk (season 1)

"Mr. Monk and the Candidate" is the two-part pilot episode of the American comedy drama detective television series Monk. It introduces the character of Adrian Monk (Tony Shalhoub), a private detective with obsessive–compulsive disorder and multiple phobias, and his assistant Sharona Fleming (Bitty Schram), as well as police officers Leland Stottlemeyer (Ted Levine) and Randy Disher (Jason Gray-Stanford). In this episode, Monk investigates an assassination attempt on a mayoral candidate.

First envisioned in 1998, Monk went through development hell due to difficulties to find an actor for the main role. After casting Shalhoub, the series' first episode was shot in Vancouver, British Columbia in 2001. "Mr. Monk and the Candidate" was written by Andy Breckman and directed by Dean Parisot. When the episode first aired in the United States on the USA Network on July 12, 2002, it was watched by 4.8 million viewers. The episode was generally well received by critics, with most of the praise regarding Shalhoub's performance as the title character.

== Plot ==
Adrian Monk was a San Francisco Police Department investigator, but the death of his wife, Trudy, exacerbated his obsessive–compulsive disorder and led him to develop depression and multiple phobias. Now, as a private detective, Monk investigates the murder of Nicole Vasques. A shooting occurs during a campaign rally, resulting in the death of mayoral candidate Warren St. Claire's bodyguard. The incumbent mayor orders Monk's former supervisor, Captain Stottlemeyer, to bring Monk in on the case, and reluctantly, he does.

Monk meets St. Claire, his wife Miranda, and their advisor Gavin Lloyd, and walks to the site of the assassination attempt. He discovers Vasques was a volunteer for the St. Claire's campaign. He goes to St. Claire campaign headquarters and questions a volunteer about Vasques. That volunteer later dies under suspicious circumstances, enhancing Monk's suspicion about a link between the Vasques and St. Claire cases.

Monk's assistant Sharona Fleming suspects that St. Claire's wife Miranda ordered her husband's assassination. Sharona's theory is supported by the fact that St. Claire is worth $150 million, but Monk thinks about other hypotheses, including one in which Miranda is having an affair with one of St. Claire's assistants. Things become clearer in Monk's mind when he watches a news report on the assassination attempt. Monk regroups everyone at the place of the campaign rally to recreate what happened that day.

He explains that the assassin was not hired to kill Warren St. Claire, but to kill the bodyguard instead. When Vasques had discovered that Lloyd was embezzling campaign funds, he approached the bodyguard about murdering Vasques. As the bodyguard refused to carry out the murder, Lloyd had him killed. To prove his theory, Monk shows a photograph of Lloyd looking at the direction of the shooter just after the shots were fired. Monk proves that Lloyd's sight line was obstructed, and that the gunshot's echo would have masked the direction of the shot. As such, it was impossible that Lloyd could have known where the shots were coming from unless he already knew where the gunman would be.

== Production ==
Monk was originally envisioned as an Inspector Clouseau type of show by an American Broadcasting Company (ABC) executive. Learning about it, co-creator David Hoberman came up with the idea of a detective with obsessive–compulsive disorder in 1998. This was inspired by his own bout with self-diagnosed obsessive–compulsive disorder. Initially, Michael Richards was considered, but ABC and Touchstone Television (now ABC Studios) worried that the audience would typecast him for more comedic roles after his previous work as Cosmo Kramer on the sitcom series Seinfeld. Hoberman revealed that the casting sessions were "depressing". USA Network's executive vice president Jeff Wachtel stated that looking for the right actor to portray Monk was "casting hell". After two years of search, the producers still had not found an actor to play the part.

In some ways, it was exactly what I was looking for because it allows me to do both comedy and drama – but I was saying I'm not sure I relate to this character. My manager said 'you're probably more like him than you would admit.'

— Tony Shalhoub

As distributors of the show, ABC and Touchstone, could not find a lead actor, it entered in development hell. This situation remained until Jackie Lyons, a former ABC's executive who joined USA, recommended Monk to her boss, Wachtel. Trying to change USA's reputation of "a muscles-and-mayhem" network, Wachtel and then USA president Doug Herzog, decided to charge on Monk, "a cerebral series". Watchel wanted to cast Tony Shalhoub, "someone who could bring the humor and passion of Monk to life", as Monk. Shalhoub initially was not interested, but after his manager's insistence and the fact the pilot director was Dean Parisot, he accepted. Parisot declared, "The pilot was a strong collaboration between myself, David Hoberman, Andy Breckman and Tony Shalhoub."

Sharona's character was originally written as an African-American, but Bitty Schram, who "had this great maternal thing crossed with an East Coast-type", according to Shalhoub, was cast instead. Ted Levine was cast in an audition in Vancouver, British Columbia as "the main cop". Jason Gray-Stanford accepted to work on it when he became aware of Shalhoub and Parisot's involvement. He originally auditioned for the role of deputy mayor and, as he was not cast, Parisot invited him to read for Disher. Gray-Stanford agreed as he became excited to try for the role of Levine's sidekick. The pilot, originally developed as a TV film, was written by Breckman and filmed in the fall of 2001 in Vancouver. Originally shot in 35 mm film, it was changed to Super 16mm for budget reasons when USA acquired it.

== Reception ==
"Mr. Monk and the Candidate" was first broadcast in the United States on the USA Network at 9 pm EST on July 12, 2002. According to Nielsen Media Research, the episode was viewed by an estimated number of 4.8 million viewers with a 3.5 household rating. This rating made it the highest rated program on cable television that night. Although Judith S. Gillies, writing for Pittsburgh Post-Gazette, pointed it debuted in a period when other networks offer less competition, Broadcasting & Cable's writer Allison Romano said the numbers were "impressive".

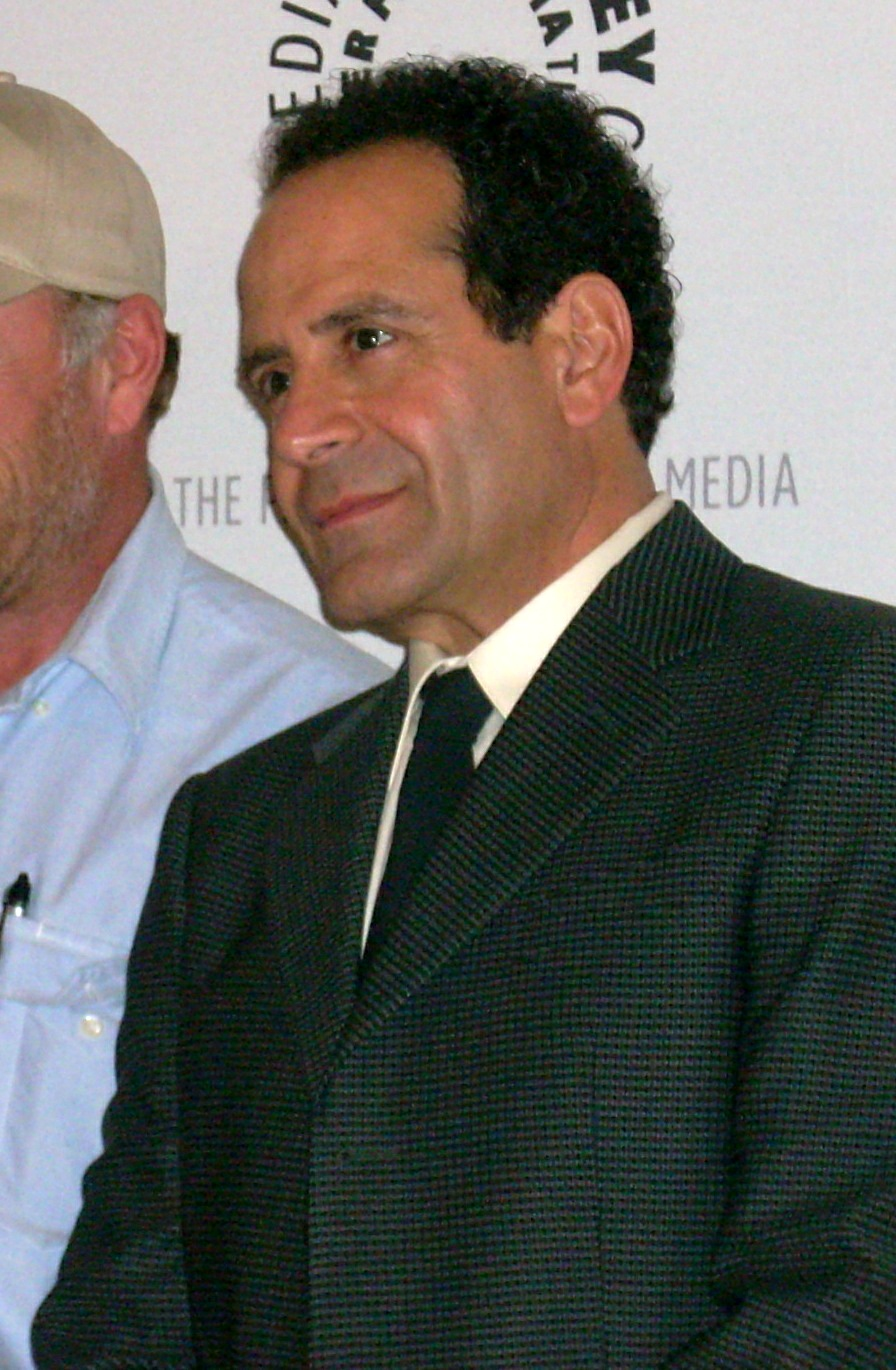
Although he initially was not interested in the role, Shalhoub's performance as Adrian Monk was lauded by critics.

Traylor Howard, who replaced Schram as Monk's assistant in the middle of the third season, elected it as her favorite episode along with "Mr. Monk vs. the Cobra". In The Futon Critic's Brian Ford Sullivan ranking of the fifty best episodes of 2002, it was placed 17th. David Bianculli, a writer for New York Daily News, said the pilot "not only establishes the character of Monk, it establishes the perfect tone for the show, a delicate but deft blend of wry humor and tender drama." United Feature Syndicate's critic Kevin McDonough praised the "whimsical" direction, and added "Monk is not easy to love, but shines as a funny and fresh alternative to summer reruns." It was also called "fresh and funny" by Entertainment Weekly's Bruce Fretts, and an "invigorating" "fresh spring breeze in the middle of summer" by The Washington Post's Tom Shales. Variety's Phil Gallo praised the "breezy gait of the storytelling, the nicely explained quirks of a brilliant mind and Tony Shalhoub's sterling characterization" in his review. Tom Gliatto, a People's critic, declared "This is probably not a clinically accurate portrayal of an OCD sufferer, but Shalhoub's gentle earnestness keeps it from being gimmicky." San Francisco Chronicle's Tim Goodman praised how OCD was used "creatively from humor to sadness." Chris Hicks of Deseret News declared, "this pilot episode is good enough to be a theatrical film; in fact, it's better than most features — funny, warm, character-driven and loaded with hilarious vignettes."

Ethan Alter of Media Life stated "[t]here is one funny scene in the pilot", while criticizing the writing and direction. He also said the plot is unveiled in a "plodding, visually dull" way, especially when Shalhoub is not present. However, Alter wrote Monk is "far from a bad show", calling Shalhoub "the best thing" about it. David Zurawik, in a review for The Baltimore Sun, said the major problem of it is trying to combine comedy and drama with detective fiction. Zurawik, however, praised Breckman and Shaulhoub who "combine to deliver one of the most weirdly appealing television sleuths since Richard Belzer's Detective John Munch of Homicide: Life on the Street." Anita Gates from The New York Times declared, "There is a breakthrough of sorts in this episode, and it's disappointing in its predictability". Shalhoub "is not the only reason to watch" Monk, according to Gates who praised the series for a joke "that even Six Feet Under might hesitate to do." Although he said "Story-wise, there's nothing in Monk that makes the show terribly different" from other shows of the genre, Rob Owen of Pittsburgh Post-Gazette praised Shalhoub's portrayal of Monk as well as Monk itself, calling him a "welcome addition to TV's eccentric sleuths".
