= Monk season 2 =

Monk
- Season 2
- DVD cover
- Starring: Tony Shalhoub Bitty Schram Ted Levine Jason Gray-Stanford
- No. of episodes: 16

Release
- Original network: USA Network
- Original release: June 20, 2003 – March 5, 2004

Season chronology
- ← Previous; Season 1 Next → Season 3

The second season of Monk originally aired in the United States on USA Network from June 20, 2003, to March 5, 2004. It consisted of 16 episodes. Tony Shalhoub, Bitty Schram, Ted Levine, and Jason Gray-Stanford reprised their roles as the main characters. A DVD of the season was released on October 11, 2004.

== Crew ==
Andy Breckman continued his tenure as show runner. Executive producers for the season included Breckman and David Hoberman. Universal Network Television was the primary production company backing the show. The instrumental theme (written by Jeff Beal) was replaced by "It's a Jungle Out There" by Randy Newman. The song received a Primetime Emmy Award for Outstanding Main Title Theme Music, making Monk the first show to win the award twice. Directors for the season included Randall Zisk, Jerry Levine, and Michael Zinberg. Writers for the season included David Breckman, Lee Goldberg, William Rabkin, Hy Conrad, Daniel Dratch, Michael Angeli, Tom Scharpling, Joe Toplyn, and Andy Breckman.

== Cast ==
All of the main cast from the first season returned: Tony Shalhoub as Adrian Monk, the "defective detective"; Bitty Schram as Sharona Fleming, Monk's forceful nurse and assistant; Ted Levine as Captain Leland Stottlemeyer of the SFPD; and Jason Gray-Stanford as Lieutenant Randy Disher. The role of Benjy Fleming (Sharona's son) returned to the original actor, Kane Ritchotte, and Stanley Kamel returned as Monk's psychiatrist, Dr. Charles Kroger.

Guest stars for the season included Glenne Headly in two episodes as Karen Stottlemeyer, Leland's wife, and Jarrad Paul as Monk's annoying upstairs neighbor, Kevin Dorfman. John Turturro guest starred as Monk's agoraphobic brother, Ambrose, a role that would later win him an Emmy. Tim Curry took over the role of Dale the Whale, originally handled by Adam Arkin in "Mr. Monk Meets Dale the Whale". The part of Trudy Monk, Monk's deceased wife, was played again by Stellina Rusich, but after a recast Melora Hardin replaced her for the role. Amy Sedaris reprised her role as Gail Fleming, and Sarah Silverman made her debut as Monk's biggest fan, Marci Maven.

== Episodes ==
No. overall	No. in season	Title	Directed by	Written by	Original release date	U.S. viewers (millions)
14	1	"Mr. Monk Goes Back to School"	Randall Zisk	Story by : David Breckman and Rick Kronberg; Teleplay by : David Breckman	June 20, 2003	5.43
An English teacher (Erica Yoder) falls from the clock tower at Trudy Monk's alma mater. Monk takes a job as a substitute teacher to determine whether she committed suicide or was murdered by her boyfriend, a popular science teacher (Andrew McCarthy). Also stars Rosalind Chao and David Rasche.
15	2	"Mr. Monk Goes to Mexico"	Ron Underwood	Lee Goldberg and William Rabkin	June 27, 2003	4.03
A college student on spring break in Mexico dies in a skydiving accident, but an autopsy suggests that he drowned in midair. Monk and Sharona are called in to help with the case and must deal with stolen luggage, a lack of Monk's favorite brand of bottled water, and multiple attempts on his life. Guest stars Tony Plana.
16	3	"Mr. Monk Goes to the Ballgame"	Michael Spiller	Hy Conrad	July 11, 2003	3.64
Monk comes to the aid of a star baseball player (Christopher Wiehl), on the verge of breaking the home run record, after someone trying to protect the record murders the player's lover and her husband. Rainn Wilson guest stars as Walker Browning.
17	4	"Mr. Monk Goes to the Circus"	Randall Zisk	James Krieg	July 18, 2003	4.07
Monk tries to figure out how a vengeful circus acrobat (Lolita Davidovich) murdered her ex-husband, the ringmaster, with a broken foot. But Monk must also get Sharona to overcome her fear of elephants in order to disprove her accusations of insensitivity against him.
18	5	"Mr. Monk and the Very, Very Old Man"	Lawrence Trilling	Daniel Dratch	July 25, 2003	3.65
Captain Stottlemeyer's wife throws his life into disarray first by nagging him into investigating the death of the world's oldest man (Patrick Crenshaw), then by throwing him out so that he has no choice but to move in with Monk, and they must solve the murder as quickly as possible before they both lose their minds. First on-screen appearance of Karen Stottlemeyer (Glenne Headly). Also stars Kurt Fuller.
19	6	"Mr. Monk Goes to the Theater"	Ron Underwood	Story by : Wendy Mass and Stu Levine; Teleplay by : Tom Scharpling	August 1, 2003	4.70
While acting in a play, Sharona's sister Gail (Amy Sedaris) becomes the prime suspect in the murder of her co-star and ex-boyfriend, Hal Duncan (Marc Vann), after he dies onstage with a knife buried in his chest. At the urging of Sharona and her mother (Betty Buckley), Monk begins to investigate and suspects Gail's understudy, Jenna (Melissa George) murdered Hal to steal Gail's role, but finds himself stepping into the spotlight as he tries to prove it.
20	7	"Mr. Monk and the Sleeping Suspect"	Jerry Levine	Karl Schaefer	August 8, 2003	4.52
After a woman is killed by a mail bomb, Monk becomes convinced that her brother is the culprit, despite the fact that the man has been in a coma for months. Sharona's ex-husband Trevor (Frank John Hughes) visits her and Benjy, claiming to have turned his life around and wanting them to move to New Jersey with him.
21	8	"Mr. Monk Meets the Playboy"	Tom DiCillo	James Krieg	August 15, 2003	2.79 (HH)
A disagreement between the owner and publisher of a popular men's magazine (Gary Cole, Mark Tymchyshyn) ends with the publisher's murder in his private gym. Monk and Sharona visit the owner's opulent party palace to investigate the crime, but Monk finds himself facing an uncomfortable choice: drop the case or watch the prime suspect ruin Sharona's life by publishing compromising photos from her past. Also guest stars Danny Bonaduce as himself.
22	9	"Mr. Monk and the 12th Man"	Michael Zinberg	Michael Angeli	August 22, 2003	4.36
Monk is called in to investigate a series of murders whose methods and victims seem to have nothing in common. Meanwhile, Sharona's new relationship with the deputy mayor (Jerry Levine) has the entire police department fawning over her. Also stars Billy Gardell, Ed Marinaro, and Lauren Tom.
23	10	"Mr. Monk and the Paperboy"	Michael Fresco	David Breckman and Hy Conrad	January 16, 2004	5.95
Monk's home life is thrown into turmoil after his paperboy is murdered outside the front door and his upstairs neighbor, Kevin Dorfman (Jarrad Paul), begins a whirlwind romance with a convenience store clerk. The sounds of their lovemaking keep Monk up at night. Monk is certain there is something in that particular newspaper that the killer does not want him to see. While examining it, Monk manages to solve a local hit-and-run and a murder in Paris. A related murder outside a night deposit box helps him solve his case.
24	11	"Mr. Monk and the Three Pies"	Randall Zisk	Tom Scharpling and Daniel Dratch	January 23, 2004	4.94
An investigation into the carjacking death of a woman at a town festival leads Monk to an uneasy reunion with his estranged, agoraphobic brother Ambrose (John Turturro), who is convinced that his next-door neighbor (Holt McCallany) murdered his wife. Also stars Leslie Jordan.
25	12	"Mr. Monk and the TV Star"	Randall Zisk	Tom Scharpling	January 30, 2004	6.27
The ex-wife of the star (Billy Burke) of a popular crime television series is stabbed to death in her home. Monk is convinced that the actor killed her, but his seemingly perfect alibi and a confession by his biggest fan leave Monk floundering in his search for the truth. First appearance of Sarah Silverman as Marci Maven.
26	13	"Mr. Monk and the Missing Granny"	Tony Bill	Joe Toplyn	February 6, 2004	5.52
A law student (Rachel Dratch) offers to help Monk win reinstatement to the police force if he can catch her grandmother's kidnappers. A bizarre ransom demand - turkey dinners for the homeless - and the apparent involvement of a 1960s-era activist group send the case in unexpected directions as Monk anticipates returning to duty as a cop. Also stars Michael Shalhoub and Larry Hankin.
27	14	"Mr. Monk and the Captain's Wife"	Jerry Levine	Story by : Andy Breckman and Beth Landou; Teleplay by : Andy Breckman	February 13, 2004	5.60
Karen Stottlemeyer is critically injured after crashing into a tow truck whose driver has been shot dead by a roadside sniper. As Monk concentrates on the fact that the shooter and victim were both barefoot, Leland puts his career at risk in an effort to tie a labor union boss to the crime, even though Monk believes the labor dispute was unrelated.
28	15	"Mr. Monk Gets Married"	Craig Zisk	David Breckman	February 27, 2004	4.77
Monk and Sharona pretend to be married in order to go undercover at a couples' therapy retreat and investigate Lt. Disher's new stepfather, an antiques dealer (Nestor Carbonell) over 20 years his new wife's junior. The man is obsessed with finding a cache of gold supposedly hidden on the property during the California Gold Rush, and Disher begins to suspect him in the disappearance of his business partner (Michael Ensign). Jane Lynch guest stars as the therapist, and William Sanderson as Joshua Skinner.
29	16	"Mr. Monk Goes to Jail"	Jerry Levine	Chris Manheim	March 5, 2004	5.51
When a death row inmate is fatally poisoned 45 minutes before his scheduled execution, Monk visits the prison to investigate the case. His nemesis, Dale the Whale (Tim Curry), offers to tell Monk everything he knows about Trudy's death if Monk finds the killer. Acting on a tip from the prison librarian (Kathy Baker), Monk goes undercover as an inmate and is assigned to a cell with a quadruple murderer (Danny Trejo), whom he becomes friends with.

- A (HH) listed next to a viewership number indicates the number of household viewers. These are only used if total viewership numbers were unavailable for that particular episode.

== Reception ==
The first season received positive reviews from critics. On Rotten Tomatoes, season 2 has an approval rating of 100% based on eight reviews.

== Awards and nominations ==
=== Emmy Awards ===
- Outstanding Actor – Comedy Series (Tony Shalhoub, nominated)
- Outstanding Casting – Comedy Series (nominated)
- Outstanding Guest Actor – Comedy Series (John Turturro for playing "Ambrose Monk" in "Mr. Monk and the Three Pies", won)
- Outstanding Main Title Theme Music (Randy Newman for "It's a Jungle Out There", won)

=== Golden Globe Awards ===
- Best Actor – Musical or Comedy Series (Tony Shalhoub, nominated)
- Best Actress – Musical or Comedy Series (Bitty Schram for playing "Sharona Fleming", nominated)
- Best Series – Musical or Comedy (nominated)

=== Screen Actors Guild ===
- Outstanding Actor – Comedy Series (Tony Shalhoub for playing "Adrian Monk", won)
