= Sierra Springs =

American brand of spring water

- Industry: Retail
- Founded: 1950; 76 years ago
- Headquarters: Sacramento, California
- Products: Bottled water
- Website: www.sierrasprings.com

Sierra Springs is a brand of spring water owned by Primo Water. The company began in 1950 in Sacramento, California, but has since branched out to the U.S. west coast and as far east as Texas. Most of its operations are in Oregon.

Sierra Springs water was the only brand of bottled water consumed by Adrian Monk (from the television series Monk), during the first five seasons of the series. In later episodes Monk changed to the fictitious brand Summit Creek.
