= Framed (1990 film) =

- Genre: Comedy; Crime
- Written by: Gary Rosen
- Directed by: Dean Parisot
- Starring: Jeff Goldblum; Kristin Scott Thomas; Todd Graff; Michael Lerner
- Music by: William Olvis
- Country of origin: United States
- Original language: English

Production
- Executive producer: Neal H. Moritz
- Producers: Elaine Sperber; Gary Rosen
- Cinematography: Yuri Neyman
- Editor: Suzanne Pettit
- Running time: 90 minutes
- Production company: HBO Pictures

Original release
- Network: HBO
- Release: June 24, 1990

Framed is a 1990 television movie directed by Dean Parisot and it was produced for Home Box Office (HBO). It was written by Gary Rosen. Jeff Goldblum and Kristin Scott Thomas star.

== Plot ==
A painter is accused of art forgery. He thinks his girlfriend betrayed him, so it's time for revenge.

== Production ==
Filming took place in Paris.

== Airing ==
The film aired on HBO on June 24, 1990.
