= Conversations with My Father =

Play by Herb Gardner

Conversations with My Father is a play by Herb Gardner. The play, which ran on Broadway in 1992 to 1993, was a finalist for the 1992 Pulitzer Prize for Drama.

Broadway Playbill

== Overview ==
The play focuses on Eddie Ross (born Goldberg), who is a Russian immigrant. Eddie is a bartender at the Homeland Tavern on Canal Street in Manhattan. His son Charlie narrates the story, as a series of vignettes spanning the years between 1936 and 1976. Charlie yearns to establish - at the very least - a peaceful co-existence with his angry, remote, and verbally and emotionally abusive father, who has spent forty years in America's melting pot trying to reject his heritage. While exploring the relationship between the two, Gardner presents the saga of a first generation of American Jews who came of age in the Depression and were assimilated at a high price during and after World War II.

The play contains recorded music, including Yiddish Music Hall songs "Rumania" and "In Odessa", as well as "Santa Claus is Coming to Town" and others.

== Productions ==
The play premiered at the Seattle Repertory Theatre in 1991, directed by Daniel Sullivan and starring Judd Hirsch.

The play opened on Broadway at the Royale Theatre on March 22, 1992 and closed on March 14, 1993, after 402 performances and 30 previews. Directed by Daniel Sullivan, the cast included Judd Hirsch (Eddie), Tony Shalhoub (Charlie), David Margulies (Zaretsky), William Biff McGuire (Nick), Marilyn Sokol, John Procaccino, Richard E. Council, David Krumholtz (Young Charlie), and Jason Biggs (Young Joey). Jason Woliner replaced Krumholtz for the second half of the run, and James Belushi replaced Hirsch in the second week of February 1993, for the final month before the play closed ("The actor, whose first performance was last Tuesday..." written on February 17, 1993.).

The play was a finalist for the 1992 Pulitzer Prize for Drama.

The play was presented by the Center Theatre Group/Ahmanson Theatre at the James A. Doolittle Theatre, Hollywood, California from October 14, 1993 to December 19. Directed by Daniel Sullivan, the cast featured Judd Hirsch (Eddie), James Sutorius (Charlie) and William Biff McGuire (Nick).

== Critical response ==
Ross Wetzsteon, in an article prior to the official Broadway opening, in the New York magazine noted: "Gardner alternates...between the hilarious and the horrific. A sweeping and anguished epic with jolts of aching laughter his new departure contains edgily dimensioned characters, provocatively unresolved themes and deeply, directly engaged feelings."

== Awards and nominations ==
Source: PlaybillVault

- Tony Award for Best Actor in Play (Hirsch, winner)
- Tony Award for Best Featured Actor in a Play (Shalhoub, nominee)
- Tony Award for Best Direction of a Play (nominee)
- 1992 Pulitzer Prize for Drama (nominee)
