= Dean Parisot =

American film and television director

- Born: July 6, 1952 (age 73); Wilton, Connecticut, U.S.
- Occupations: Film and television director
- Spouse: Sally Menke (m. 1986; died 2010)
- Children: 2

Aldo Luis "Dean" Parisot (born July 6, 1952) is an American film and television director. He is best known as the director of Galaxy Quest.

Among his television credits are episodes of Monk (including the two-hour pilot "Mr. Monk and the Candidate"), Northern Exposure and Curb Your Enthusiasm.

== Biography ==
Parisot was born in Wilton, Connecticut, to Ellen James (née Lewis), a painter and art teacher, and Aldo Parisot, a Brazilian-born cellist and pedagogue.

He graduated from New York University's Tisch School of the Arts. He took part in the Sundance Institute's June Lab.

In 2012, he was hired to direct the third installment of the Bill & Ted franchise. The film, Bill & Ted Face the Music, was released on August 28, 2020.

Parisot was married to film editor Sally Menke until her death in 2010; they had two children.

== Awards ==
He won the 1988 Academy Award for Best Live Action Short Film for The Appointments of Dennis Jennings, which was co-written by and starred comedian Steven Wright, with whom he shares the award.

== Filmography ==
Short film

- Tom Goes to the Bar (1985)
- The Appointments of Dennis Jennings (1988)
- The Last Seat (1995)

Feature film

Year	Title	Distribution
1998	Home Fries	Warner Bros.
1999	Galaxy Quest	DreamWorks Pictures
2005	Fun with Dick and Jane	Sony Pictures Releasing
2013	Red 2	Summit Entertainment
2020	Bill & Ted Face the Music	United Artists Releasing

TV movies

Year	Title	Director	Executive Producer
1990	Framed	Yes	No
1995	The Kathy & Mo Show: The Dark Side	Yes	No
1995	The Conversation	Yes	No
1999	A.T.F.	Yes	Yes
2007	Area 57	Yes	Yes
2009	See Kate Run	Yes	No

TV series

Year	Title	Director	Producer	Notes
1988–1990	Reading Rainbow	Yes	No	5 episodes
1990	Steven Wright: Wicker Chairs and Gravity	Yes	No	TV special; Also writer
1991	Get a Life	Yes	No	3 episodes
1992	Great Scott!	Yes	No	Episode "Book Crook"
1992–1993	Northern Exposure	Yes	No	3 episodes
1993	Bakersfield P.D.	Yes	Yes	Directed 3 episodes
1995	Under Suspicion	Yes	No	Episode "Kinky Murder"
1995	The Marshal	Yes	No	4 episodes
1995	ER	Yes	No	Episode "What Life?"
1998	L.A. Doctors	Yes	No	Episode "Under the Radar"
2001	The Job	Yes	No	Episode "Pilot"
2001	Curb Your Enthusiasm	Yes	No	Episode "Shaq"
2002	The Tick	Yes	No	Episode "Arthur, Interrupted"
2002–2009	Monk	Yes	No	Episodes "Mr. Monk and the Candidate" and "Mr. Monk and the Blue Flu"
2010	The Deep End	Yes	No	Unaired pilot
2010–2011	The Good Wife	Yes	No	Episodes "Double Jeopardy" and "Affairs of State"
2011	Modern Family	Yes	No	Episode "Regrets Only"
2012–2015	Justified	Yes	No	Episodes "The Devil You Know", "Slaughterhouse", "Good Intentions" and "Cash Game"
2015	Masters of Sex	Yes	No	Episode "Three's a Crowd"
2015–2016	Grace and Frankie	Yes	No	Episodes "The Vows" and "The Wish"
2016	Dirk Gently's Holistic Detective Agency	Yes	Executive	Directed episodes "Horizons" and "Lost & Found"
2017	Santa Clarita Diet	Yes	No	Episode "Baka, Bile and Baseball Bats"
2018–2019	Good Girls	Yes	Executive	Directed 4 episodes
