= Rob Thompson (director) =

American television director and producer

- Born: United States
- Occupation(s): Television director, producer, screenwriter
- Years active: 1975–present

Rob Thompson is an American television director, producer and screenwriter.

As a director, his most notable credits include L.A. Law, The Wonder Years, Doogie Howser, M.D., Dream On, Ed, The Chris Isaak Show, Monk and Northern Exposure. He won a Primetime Emmy Award for his work in the latter series as a part of the producing and writing team in 1992.
