= Adrian Monk =

Fictional American private investigator

- Monk character
- Shalhoub as Monk
- First appearance: "Mr. Monk and the Candidate"
- Created by: Andy Breckman; David Hoberman
- Portrayed by: Tony Shalhoub; Aaron Linker (in Little Monk); Grant Rosenmeyer (in "Mr. Monk and Little Monk")

In-universe information
- Nickname: San Francisco's "Defective Detective"

Adrian Monk, portrayed by Tony Shalhoub, is the title character and protagonist of the USA Network television series Monk. He is a renowned former homicide detective for the San Francisco Police Department. He has obsessive–compulsive disorder (OCD) and multiple phobias, all of which intensified after the murder of his wife Trudy, who died in a car bomb, resulting in his suspension from the department. He works as a private police homicide consultant and undergoes therapy with the ultimate goal of overcoming his grief, taking control of his phobias and disorder, and being reinstated as a police detective. Monk has investigated and solved more than 100 homicides.

Series co-creator David Hoberman says that he based Monk partly on himself, and also on other fictional detectives such as Lt. Columbo, Hercule Poirot and Sherlock Holmes. Other actors considered for the role included Dave Foley, John Ritter, Henry Winkler, Stanley Tucci, Alfred Molina and Michael Richards. The network eventually chose Shalhoub because they felt he could "bring the humor and passion of Monk to life".

Both Monk and Shalhoub have garnered many accolades. Monk was included in Bravo's list of The 100 Greatest Television Characters of All Time, and Shalhoub has won various awards for his portrayal, including a Golden Globe Award, three Primetime Emmy Awards and two Actor Awards.

== Character development ==
=== Creation ===
Monk was originally envisioned as a "more goofy and physical" Inspector Clouseau type of character. However, co-creator David Hoberman came up with the idea of a detective with obsessive–compulsive disorder. This was inspired by his own bout with self-diagnosed obsessive–compulsive disorder; in a Pittsburgh Post-Gazette interview, he stated that, "Like Monk, I couldn't walk on cracks and had to touch poles. I have no idea why—but if I didn't do these things, something terrible would happen."

Other fictional inspirations include Columbo and Sherlock Holmes, and his obsession with neatness and order may be an homage to Hercule Poirot. Like Holmes, and occasionally Poirot, Monk is accompanied by an earnest assistant with little or no detective ability, similar to Doctor Watson and Captain Hastings, respectively; Monk's two major allies from the police department, Captain Stottlemeyer and Lieutenant Disher (credited as "Deacon" in the pilot episode), are reminiscent of Inspector Lestrade and Chief Inspector James H. Japp, Holmes' and Poirot's well-meaning but ineffectual respective police counterparts. In addition, Monk has a brother whose abilities of deduction are even more amazing than his, yet much more geographically limited due to his own personal problems, somewhat in the style of Mycroft Holmes (who is more adept than Sherlock but notoriously lazy).

When trying to think of a possible name for the character, co-creator Andy Breckman decided to look for a "simple monosyllabic last name".

=== Casting ===
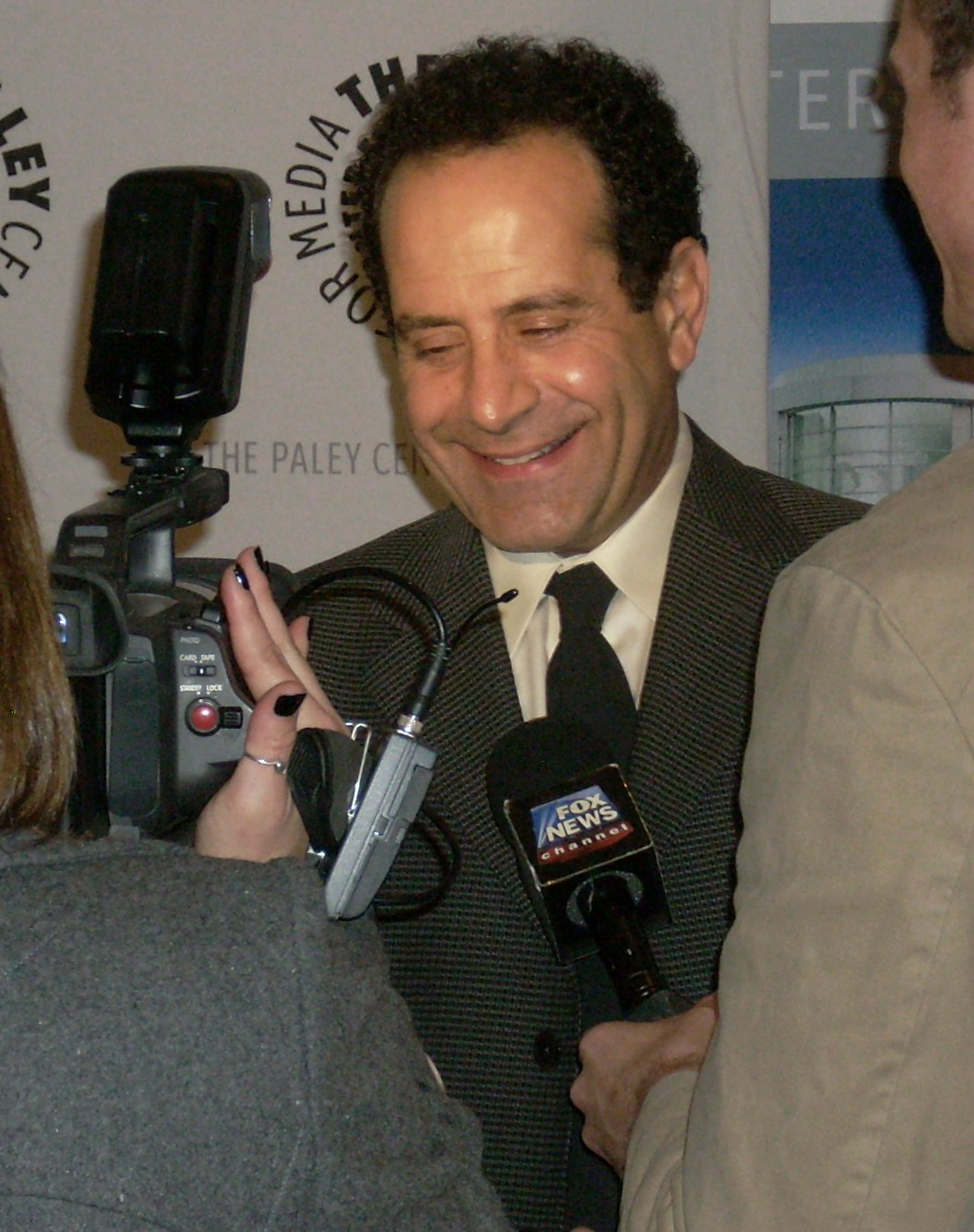
Shalhoub was cast because the producers felt he could "bring the humor and passion of Monk to life".

Co-creator David Hoberman revealed that the casting sessions were "depressing". USA Network's executive vice president Jeff Wachtel stated that looking for the right actor to portray Monk was "casting hell". After two years of developing, the producers still had not found an actor to play the part. Although Michael Richards was considered, distributors of the show ABC and Touchstone worried that the audience would typecast him for more comedic roles after his previous work as Cosmo Kramer on the sitcom series Seinfeld. After Richards dropped out of the project, he went on to star in another series about a private detective, The Michael Richards Show, which was cancelled after eight episodes.

== Personality ==
"Monk is a living legend. Quick, brilliant, analytical... [with] an encyclopedic knowledge of a dozen unconventional and assorted subjects, from door locks to horticulture to architecture to human psychology."

— Breckman's description of Monk.

=== Phobias ===
In the script for the pilot, "Mr. Monk and the Candidate", Monk is described as being "a modern day Sherlock Holmes", only "nuts". In the introductory scene of the episode, he is examining the scene of Nicole Vasques' murder, and picks up several important clues, but frequently interrupts himself to wonder aloud whether he left his stove on when he left the house that morning. In Episode 8 of Season 6,"Mr. Monk and the Daredevil", Monk mentions that he has 312 phobias. The strongest of these phobias are: germs, dentists, sharp or pointed objects, vomiting, death and dead things, snakes, crowds, heights, fear, mushrooms, soccer riots and small spaces, as Monk also mentions in the season 2 episode "Mr. Monk and the Very Very Old Man". In addition, new phobias develop at seemingly random intervals, such as a temporary fear of blankets at the end of the 7th Episode of Season 5,"Mr. Monk Gets a New Shrink". Though it is impossible to determine his strongest phobia, there does appear to be some form of hierarchy between them: in the series finale "Mr. Monk and the End", it is made clear that his fear of vomiting is greater than his fear of death. He has also stated, "Snakes trump heights!".

Due to his overpowering fear of germs, Monk refuses to touch door handles and other common objects with his bare hands, avoids contact with anything dirty, and always uses sanitary wipes after human contact, including basic handshakes. He is also unable to eat food that other people have touched—as shown in the season 7 episode "Mr. Monk Falls in Love" when he and Leyla Zlatavich go out to a Zemenian restaurant—and tends to throw away household items after people touch them, such as ladles and plastic storage containers.

=== Assistants ===
Monk's phobias and anxiety disorders make him depend on personal assistants, who drive him around, do his shopping, and always carry a supply of wipes for his use, as shown in episodes like "Mr. Monk Meets the Playboy", "Mr. Monk Goes to the Carnival", etc. They also take active roles in organizing his consultancy work, and sometimes investigate cases themselves. His first assistant, Sharona Fleming (Bitty Schram), is a single mother and practical nurse by profession, hired by the police department to help Monk recover from the three-year catatonic state he lapsed into after Trudy's death. After several years of loyal service, Sharona leaves the show in season 3 to return to New Jersey and remarry her ex-husband Trevor. After her abrupt departure, Monk has a chance meeting with Natalie Teeger (Traylor Howard), another single mother, whom he hires as his new assistant starting in Season 3 Episode 10 "Mr. Monk and the Red Herring".

=== Fixations ===
Monk carries out futile and endless attempts to make the world "balanced". Monk is fixated with symmetry, going so far as to always cut his pancakes into squares. He strongly prefers familiarity and rigorous structure in his activities. Monk only drinks Sierra Springs water throughout seasons 1-5 and a fictional brand (Summit Creek) throughout seasons 6–8, to the point that in the season 2 episode "Mr. Monk Goes to Mexico", Monk goes without drinking for several days because he cannot find any Sierra Springs. Monk also has great difficulty in standard social situations, so much so that he must write down common small talk phrases on note cards in an attempt to successfully socialize. While his obsessive attention to minute detail cripples him socially, it makes him a gifted detective and profiler. He has a photographic memory, and can reconstruct entire crime scenes based on little more than scraps of detail that seem unimportant to his colleagues. His trademark method of examining a crime scene, which Sharona used to call his "Zen Sherlock Holmes thing", is to wander seemingly aimlessly around a crime scene, occasionally holding up his hands, as though framing a shot for a photograph. Shalhoub explained in an interview that Monk does this because it "isolates and cuts the crime scene into slices" and causes Monk to look at parts of the crime scene instead of the whole.

Monk's delicate mental condition means that his ability to function can be severely impaired by a variety of factors. One example is shown during the season 5 episode "Mr. Monk and the Garbage Strike", in which the smell of garbage prevents Monk from being able to easily identify the murderer of sanitation union boss Jimmy Cusack, eventually causing him to have a psychotic break. Another example is when entering a chaotic murder scene in the episode "Mr. Monk Meets Dale the Whale", his first impulse is to straighten the lamps, though he is frequently able to hold off his fixations when examining bodies or collecting evidence. Even though Monk's mental state in the series is said to be a result of his wife's death, he shows signs of OCD in flashbacks dating back to childhood. To deal with his OCD and phobias, Monk visits a psychiatrist—Dr. Charles Kroger (Stanley Kamel) in the first six seasons and Dr. Neven Bell (Héctor Elizondo) in the last two seasons—weekly, and at several points, daily. Moments of extreme stress can cause Monk to enter a dissociative state, as seen in the Season 1 episode "Mr. Monk and the Earthquake"; he begins speaking in gibberish during these periods, severely hindering his investigative skills.

Over the course of the show (roughly 8 years), Monk overcomes many of his phobias and some aspects of his OCD. Though he has not been cured of many of them, if any at all, he has been able to put them in the back of his mind when involved in case work. One breakthrough is shown in Season 8 Episode 8,"Mr. Monk Goes to Group Therapy", when Adrian is locked in a car trunk with his fellow OCD patient and personal rival, Harold Krenshaw. During the terrifying trip, both men overcome their longstanding claustrophobia (fear of small spaces), as well as their own differences, resulting in them becoming friends. Possibly due to this, as well as the many cases Monk has solved over the years, he is reinstated as detective first class by Stottlemeyer in Season 8 Episode 14,"Mr. Monk and the Badge". Though he is very excited about his reinstatement initially, Monk realizes that becoming a detective again did not mean that he would be happier. In a session with Dr. Bell, Monk realizes he was relatively happier as a private detective and consultant to the SFPD as he had been his own boss. After overcoming his fear of heights and single-handedly capturing a killer window-washer, Monk turns in his badge. In the series finale, he learns that his late wife, Trudy, had given birth to a daughter years before they had met. The knowledge and events of the episode lead to him becoming more cheerful and overcoming a majority of his earlier fixations.

== Character background ==
=== Childhood and family ===
Monk was born October 17, 1959; the episode "Happy Birthday, Mr. Monk" takes place during the week of October 16, 2009, and reveals that his 50th birthday is the next day, October 17, 2009.

It is known that he was born in the fictitious Contra Costa County town of Tewksbury Heights, a subdivision of East Richmond Heights, to parents Agnes (Rose Abdoo) and Jack Monk, Sr (Dan Hedaya). His parents were very strict and overprotective, although his mother was emotionally distant and seemed to have difficulty expressing affection. Adrian's father, Jack Monk, abandoned the family when Adrian was eight years old when he went out for Chinese food and did not return. Adrian has an agoraphobic brother named Ambrose (John Turturro), from whom he was estranged for seven years following Trudy's death. Monk states that his mother died in 1994. The episode "Mr. Monk and the Marathon Man" reveals that Monk ran track in high school, but quit when he entered college. The episode "Mr. Monk and the Other Detective" reveals that his alma mater is the University of California, Berkeley. In "Mr. Monk and the Class Reunion", it is revealed that Monk had the nickname "Captain Cool" in college, due to the fact that he spent every weekend defrosting the student-lounge refrigerator in his dormitory.

In the episode "Mr. Monk and the Three Pies", it is revealed that Monk was angry at his brother for never contacting him after Trudy's death. When the two are reunited, Ambrose admits he did not call Adrian because he believed that he was responsible for her death. Trudy was out getting Ambrose cough medicine and was in the store's parking garage when she was killed. But Adrian hugs Ambrose and tells him he is not responsible for Trudy's death.

Their father, Jack, remained unseen in the series until the season 5 episode "Mr. Monk Meets His Dad". Jack explains that he did not return to his family because the message in his fortune cookie read "Stand by your man", which he interpreted to mean that he should follow his own path. Adrian does not forgive his father at first, but warms up to him while assisting him on his duties as a truck driver. Jack mentions reading Sherlock Holmes stories to Adrian, who eventually learned to solve the mysteries before hearing the stories' endings. At the end of the episode, Jack teaches Adrian how to ride a bike—something he was not there to do when Adrian was a child. Jack also mentioned that he has a son from another wife, named Jack Jr. (Steve Zahn). Monk later meets Jack Jr. in the episode "Mr. Monk's Other Brother", and helps to clear him of murder.

=== Trudy's death ===
Throughout the series, Adrian mourns his wife Trudy (Melora Hardin/Stellina Rusich), who was killed on December 14, 1997, by a car bomb he believes was for him. The death of his wife exacerbated Monk's already existing obsessive–compulsive disorder (OCD). One year later, the San Francisco Police Department (SFPD) granted him a psychological discharge. Monk calls it "a temporary suspension" and hopes to be reinstated. His grief over Trudy's death is intense and with him every day of his life; he has stated more than once that he is never truly happy and never expects to be truly happy ever again. Since Trudy's death, Monk has been consulting with the San Francisco police detectives on various cases.

As the series progresses, Monk makes several discoveries in his ongoing search to find the man who killed his wife. He discovered that the car bomb was indeed meant for Trudy and was built by a man named Warrick Tennyson (Frank Collison), who was a career criminal and explosives expert hired by a six-fingered man named Frank Nunn (Courtney Gains). In the sixth-season finale, he finally catches up with Nunn, who claims to be yet another pawn and merely a hitman who detonated the bomb built by Tennyson with no idea why Trudy was killed. This turns out to be part of a larger plot to have Nunn set up another bombing and then frame Monk for killing him; he is shot before Monk can have him arrested or convince him to surrender the name of his employer in Trudy's murder. Once Monk is cleared in Nunn's death, the police find correspondence from Nunn dating back to the era of Trudy's death. There are no names discovered, but letters referring to the person responsible, referred to simply as "The Judge". In the two-part series finale, "Mr. Monk and the End", it is revealed that "The Judge" is Ethan Rickover, an actual courtroom judge portrayed by Craig T. Nelson. Monk learns that the older, married, Rickover had an affair with Trudy when she was in her 20s, and that Trudy gave birth to and subsequently adopted out an infant daughter, Molly Evans, on January 2, 1983. Aspiring to one day join the Supreme Court, Rickover had Trudy murdered for fear that the affair would derail his chances at being elected to the court. When Monk finally helps to expose Rickover, he commits suicide, but not before indicating Molly's current whereabouts. Monk later meets and forms a paternal relationship with Molly in the series finale.

=== Music ===
In the pilot episode "Mr. Monk and the Candidate", Monk plays the clarinet during his visit to Trudy's grave. His musical abilities show up again in "Mr. Monk and the Red-Headed Stranger", when he is invited to sit in with Willie Nelson's band and later plays "Blue Eyes Crying in the Rain" with Nelson at Trudy's grave. Though Monk is not seen playing the clarinet afterwards, it occasionally is brought up in conversation (such as during a conversation with Kris Kedder in "Mr. Monk Goes to a Rock Concert").

Monk describes himself as Nelson's second-biggest fan and Trudy as his biggest.

== Reception ==
=== Critical reception ===
Critical reviews of character Adrian Monk have been positive. Howard Rosenberg of the Los Angeles Times called Monk "TV's most original sleuth ever". In a review of the show's pilot, Tim Goodman of the San Francisco Chronicle stated: "With his history and his sympathetic but funny 'problems', he [Monk] becomes one of television's most likable characters and floats a show that is, to be frank, riddled with improbability and simplicity". Monk is ranked number 99 on Bravo's list of The 100 Greatest Television Characters of All Time. He was named one of TV's Smartest Detectives by AOL.

Shalhoub's performance in the series has also been praised. Michael Sauter of Entertainment Weekly called Shalhoub's performance "original and splendid". Nancy Franklin of The New Yorker said that Shalhoub is "brilliant at conveying the tension between Monk's desire to conquer his disorder and his dug-in defense of his behavior". Michael Abernethy of PopMatters describes Shalhoub's performance as "exceptional", and Melanie McFarland of the Seattle Post-Intelligencer states that Shalhoub is a "careful and nuanced actor". Alan Sepinwall of the Star-Ledger described Shalhoub as "the perfect fit" for the character.

=== Awards ===
Shalhoub has earned various awards and nominations for his work in Monk. He has been nominated for the Primetime Emmy Award for Outstanding Lead Actor in a Comedy Series each year from 2003 to 2010, winning in 2003, 2005 and 2006. In 2003, Shalhoub won the Golden Globe Award for Best Actor – Television Series Musical or Comedy; he was nominated for the same category in 2004, 2005, 2007 and 2009. He received the 2004 and the 2005 Actor Award for Outstanding Performance by a Male Actor in a Comedy Series, with nominations in the same category in 2003, 2006, 2007, 2008 and 2009.

== Sources ==
- Erdmann, Terry J; Block, Paula M (July 2006), Monk: The Official Episode Guide, St. Martin's Griffin, ISBN 0-312-35461-4
