= Tony Shalhoub =

American actor (born 1953)

- Shalhoub in 2026
- Born: Anthony Marc Shalhoub; October 9, 1953 (age 73); Green Bay, Wisconsin, U.S.
- Education: University of Wisconsin-Green Bay University of Southern Maine (BA); Yale University (MFA)
- Occupation: Actor
- Years active: 1980–present
- Spouse: Brooke Adams (m. 1992)
- Children: 2
- Relatives: Lynne Adams (sister-in-law)
- Awards: Full list

Signature
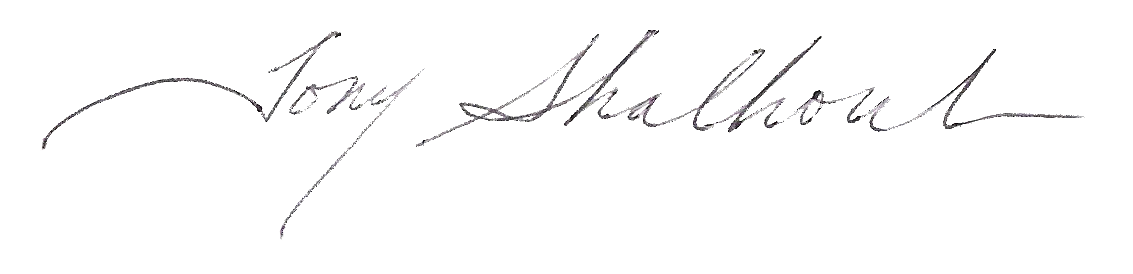

Anthony Marc Shalhoub (/ʃəlˈhuːb/ shəl-HOOB; Arabic: أنطوني مارك شلهوب; born October 9, 1953) is an American actor and filmmaker. He is known for a variety of roles ranging from comedic to dramatic on stage and screen. He has received several accolades including five Emmy Awards, a Golden Globe Award, six Actor Awards and a Tony Award as well as a nomination for a Grammy Award.

His breakout role was as Antonio Scarpacci on the NBC sitcom Wings from 1991 to 1997. He later starred as Adrian Monk in the USA Network series Monk (2002–2009), winning three Primetime Emmy Awards for Outstanding Lead Actor in a Comedy Series as well as the Golden Globe Award for Best Actor in a Comedy Series. For his supporting role as Abe Weissman, a professor turned activist and critic in the Amazon period comedy-drama The Marvelous Mrs. Maisel (2017–2023), he won the Primetime Emmy Award for Outstanding Supporting Actor in a Comedy Series.

Shalhoub has starred in films such as Quick Change (1990), Barton Fink (1991), Big Night (1996), Men in Black (1997), Gattaca (1997), Paulie (1998), The Siege (1998), Galaxy Quest (1999), Spy Kids, Thirteen Ghosts, and The Man Who Wasn't There (all 2001). He has voiced roles for the Cars franchise (2006–present), Teenage Mutant Ninja Turtles (2014), Teenage Mutant Ninja Turtles: Out of the Shadows (2016) and Rumble (2021).

On stage, he made his Broadway debut in a revival of The Odd Couple (1985). He went on to win the Tony Award for Best Actor in a Musical for his portrayal of Tewfiq Zakaria in The Band's Visit (2018). He was Tony-nominated for his performances in the Herb Gardner play Conversations with My Father (1992), the Clifford Odets play Golden Boy (2013), and the James Lapine play Act One (2014).

== Early life and education ==
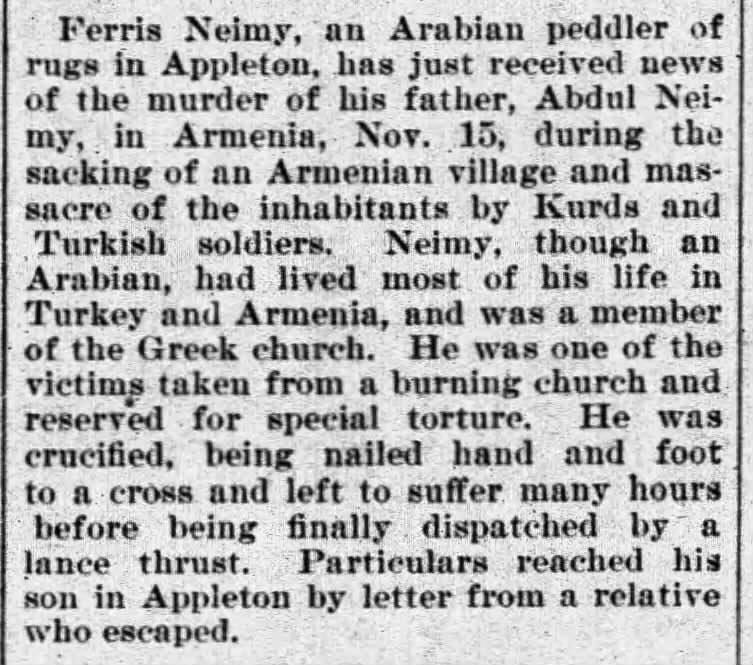
Newspaper report from the Green Bay Press-Gazette on the torture and murder of Abdul Neimy

The ninth of ten children, Shalhoub was born and raised in a Lebanese Christian household in Green Bay, Wisconsin. The family lived on Doty Street.

His father, Joseph, was from Zahle and immigrated to the United States as a child after his own parents, Milhem and Mariam, died during World War I, when Lebanon was still part of the Ottoman Empire. After immigrating to America, Joseph became a meat peddler who drove a refrigerated truck.

Joseph married Shalhoub's mother, Helen Seroogy, a Lebanese American. The two met when Joseph was taken in to be raised by her family, when both were young. The Seroogy family operated a candy store that remains a family business. (Note: as of 2021) One of Shalhoub's maternal great-great-grandfathers, Abdul Neimy, although Lebanese, was reportedly killed by being crucified in 1895 during the Hamidian massacres committed against Christian Armenians in the Ottoman Empire. Seroogy kept the large family harmonious despite the chaos, and Shalhoub described her as "funny and nutty", saying she would not allow Shalhoub and his siblings to express anger. Shalhoub attributed his therapy as an adult to that emotional restriction, but has stated that it enabled him to play calm and relaxed roles in his career.

Shalhoub was introduced to acting by an older sister, who put his name forward to be an extra in a high-school production of The King and I. After graduating from Green Bay East High School, he spent a short time at the University of Wisconsin–Green Bay before participating in the National Student Exchange to the University of Southern Maine where he later transferred and earned a bachelor's degree. He later went on to earn a master's degree from the Yale School of Drama in 1980.

== Career ==
=== 1980–2001: Rise to prominence and Wings ===
Shortly after graduating from Yale, Shalhoub moved to Cambridge, Massachusetts, where he spent four seasons with the American Repertory Theater before heading to New York City, where he found work waiting tables. He made his Broadway debut in the 1985 Rita Moreno/Sally Struthers production of The Odd Couple and was nominated for a 1992 Tony Award for his featured role in Conversations with My Father. Shalhoub met his wife, actress Brooke Adams, when they co-starred on Broadway in The Heidi Chronicles. In 1998, Shalhoub starred in The Classic Stage Company's production of Waiting for Godot alongside John Turturro and Christopher Lloyd.

After playing several small television and film roles Shalhoub landed the role of cab driver Antonio Scarpacci in the NBC sitcom Wings which he played from 1991 to 1997. Shalhoub was pleasantly surprised to land the role after having a guest appearance as a waiter in the second season. He became a regular in the third season. The character's name was kept, but the character's occupation changed to a cab driver. He affected an Italian accent for the role. Shalhoub played the role from 1991 until the series ended in 1997.

Shalhoub also made guest appearances on other shows. In 1995, he played the lead role of physicist Dr. Chester Ray Banton in The X-Files second-season episode "Soft Light", the first episode written by Vince Gilligan. The following year, he had a role in the hit NBC sitcom Frasier in the episode "The Focus Group" as an Arab newsstand owner named Manu Habbib. His first two voiceover credits were as Emir in one episode of the Disney animated series Gargoyles (1995), and Aradesh in the original Fallout (1997) in his only non-Cars related video game credit. Film roles following his Wings breakout included an excitable producer consulted by John Turturro's character in Barton Fink (1991) and a fast-talking lawyer in The Man Who Wasn't There (2001) (both directed by the Coen brothers). Other early roles included a linguistically unidentified cabby in Quick Change (1991), a concierge in Honeymoon in Vegas (1992), a drunken sailor in Addams Family Values (1993), a Cuban-American businessman in Primary Colors (1998), sleazy alien pawn shop owner Jack Jeebs in the Men in Black films (1997–2002), an attorney in A Civil Action (1998), a widowed father in Thirteen Ghosts (2001), a cameo role in the film Gattaca (1997), a Russian immigrant in the film Paulie (1998), and a has-been television star who falls in love with an actual space alien, in the Star Trek: TOS satire film Galaxy Quest (1999).

In his first major film role, Shalhoub co-starred in the film Big Night (1996), as one in a pair of Italian immigrant brothers who own a struggling ethnic restaurant. He demonstrated his dramatic range in the 1998 big-budget thriller The Siege, where he co-starred alongside Denzel Washington, Annette Bening, and Bruce Willis. His character, FBI Special Agent Frank Haddad, also a Lebanese American, suffered discrimination after terrorist attacks in New York City. He returned to series television in 1999, this time in a lead role on Stark Raving Mad, opposite Neil Patrick Harris. The show failed to attract an audience and NBC canceled the series in 2000.

=== 2002–2009: Monk and acclaim ===
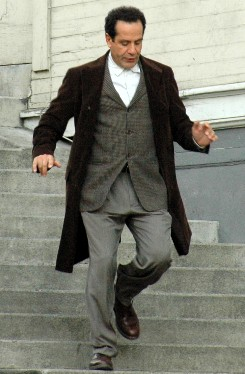
Shalhoub in 2005

After a three-year absence from the small screen, Shalhoub starred in another TV series, Monk. Airing on the USA Network, the series featured Shalhoub as Adrian Monk, a detective with obsessive-compulsive disorder. He was nominated for an Emmy Award for Outstanding Lead Actor in a Comedy Series in eight consecutive years from 2003 to 2010, winning in 2003, 2005, and 2006. He also took the Golden Globe award for Best Performance by an Actor in a Television Series – Musical or Comedy in 2003. In May 2020, NBC's Peacock streaming service posted a series of videos on YouTube during the COVID-19 pandemic, entitled the "At-Home Variety Show". Among them was a Monk short entitled "Mr. Monk Shelters in Place", featuring Shalhoub and his co-stars Traylor Howard, Ted Levine, and Jason Gray-Stanford, showing how their characters were coping with the pandemic.

Shalhoub returned in December 2006 to the Off-Broadway Second Stage Theatre, opposite Patricia Heaton for a run of The Scene by Theresa Rebeck. In addition to his acting work, Shalhoub, along with the Network of Arab-American Professionals and Zoom-in-Focus Productions, established The Arab-American Filmmaker Award Competition in 2005. Arab-American filmmakers submitted screenplays, and the chosen winner was flown to Hollywood to have their screenplay produced.

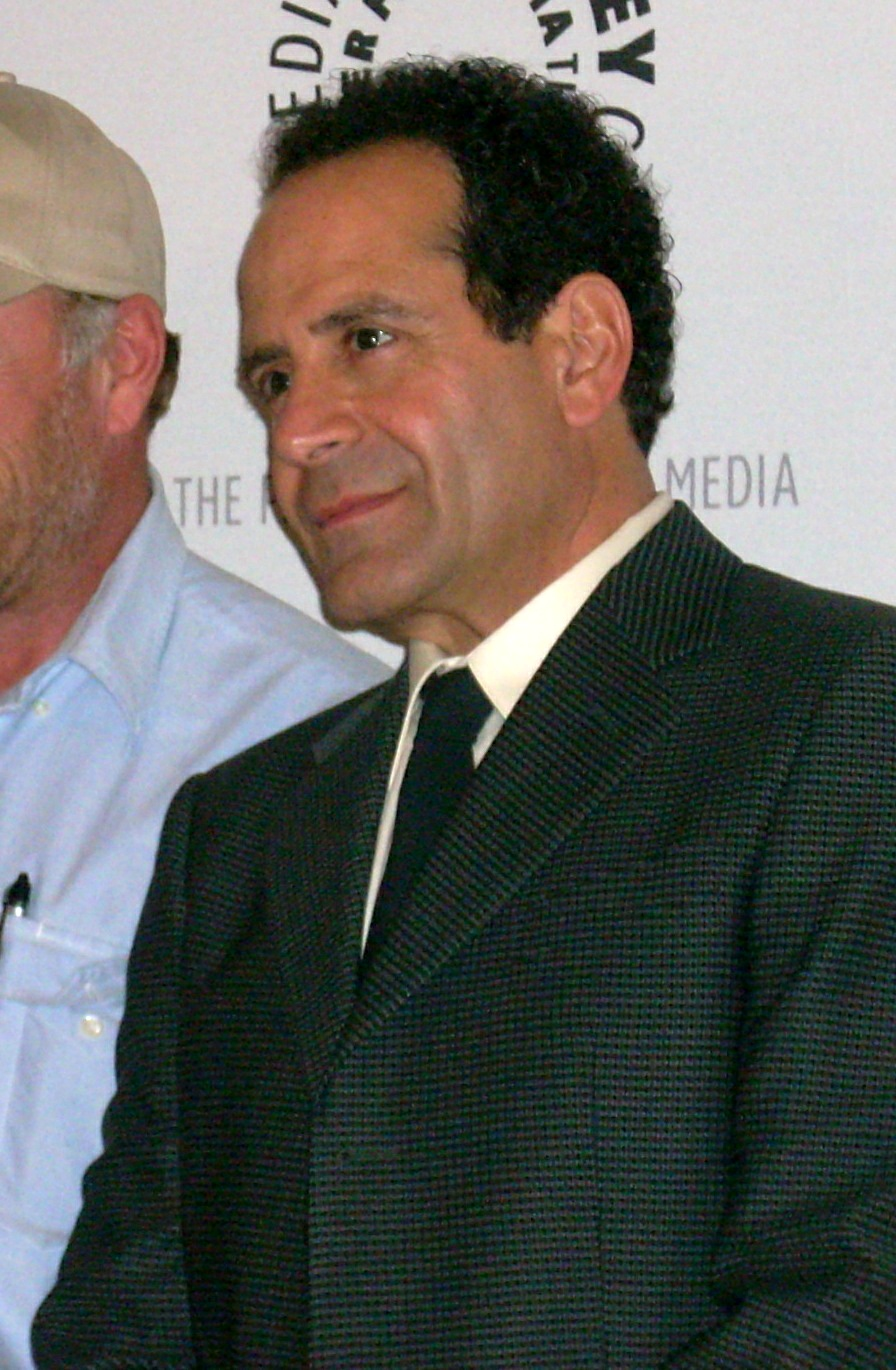
Shalhoub at the Paley Center in 2008

Shalhoub played Alexander "Alex" Minion in the first three Spy Kids films (2001–2003). He appeared with Matthew Broderick and Alec Baldwin in the 2004 Hollywood satire The Last Shot as a gruff small-time mobster with a love for movies. In 2006, he appeared in Danny Leiner's drama The Great New Wonderful as a psychologist in post-9/11 New York City. In 2007, he appeared in the horror film 1408 and on-stage off-Broadway as Charlie in The Scene. He received a 2008 Grammy nomination in the category "Best Spoken Word Album for Children" for his narration of The Cricket in Times Square. He provided the voice of Luigi, a 1959 Fiat 500 who runs a tire shop, in the 2006 Disney/Pixar film Cars and its 2011 and 2017 sequels, Cars 2 and Cars 3, respectively, as well as 3 episodes of the short-form Cars series Tales from Radiator Springs (2013–2014) and the first episode of Cars on the Road (2022), and several video games in the franchise (2006–2011).

=== 2010–2016: Return to theatre ===
In 2010, he went to Broadway to act as Saunders in a revival version of Lend Me a Tenor in New York at the Music Box Theatre. He was nominated for a 2013 Tony Award for Best Performance by a Featured Actor in a Play for Lincoln Center Theater's production of Golden Boy at the Belasco Theatre. He was nominated for a 2014 Tony Award for Best Performance by a Leading Actor in a Play for Lincoln Center Theater's production of Act One at the Vivian Beaumont Theatre. Shalhoub and his wife appeared in Samuel Beckett's Happy Days in June and July 2015 in New York City. Shalhoub played Victor Kershaw in the 2013 true crime film Pain & Gain. He voiced Splinter in the 2014 film Teenage Mutant Ninja Turtles and reprised the role in Teenage Mutant Ninja Turtles: Out of the Shadows (2016).

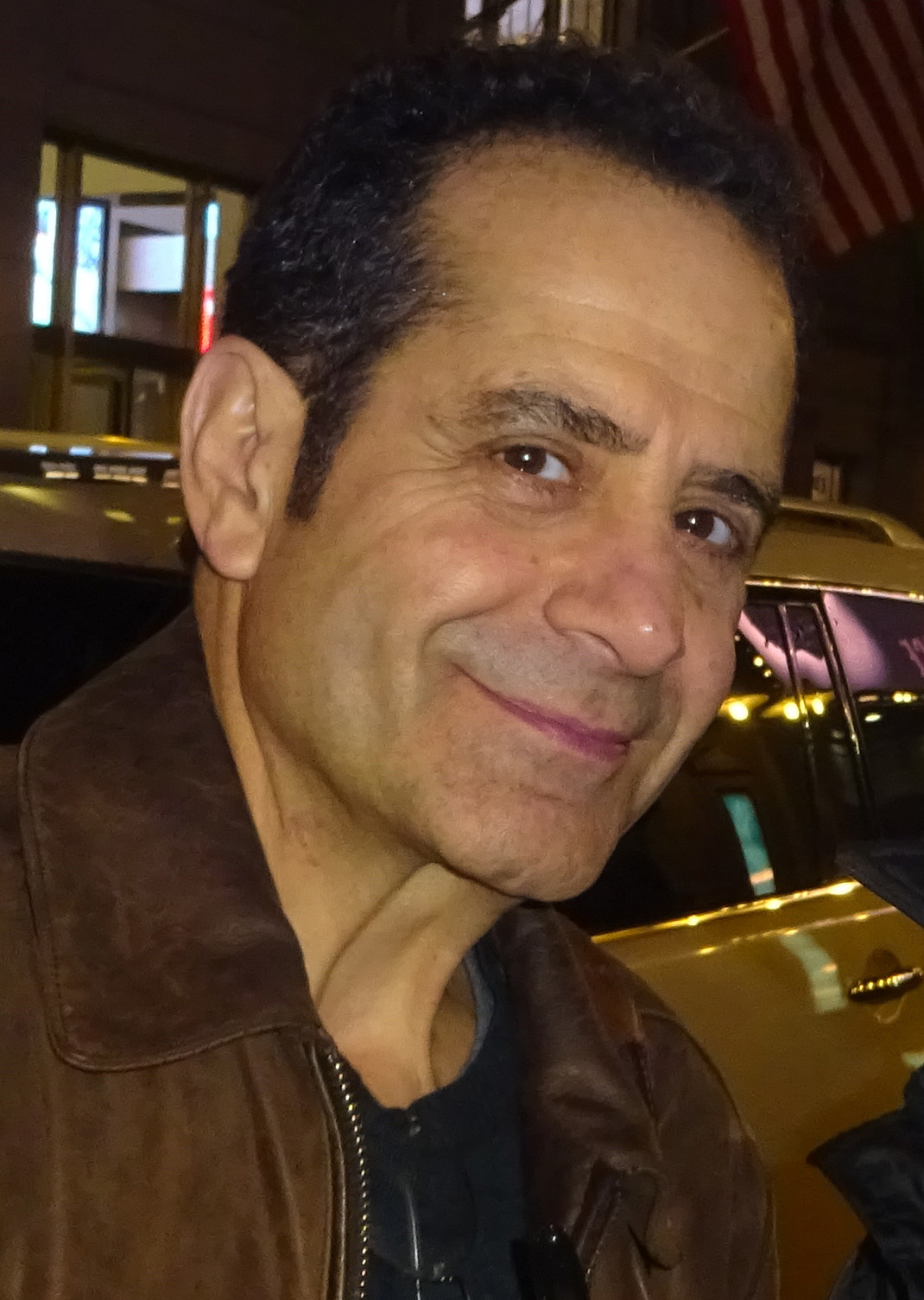
Shalhoub in 2017

He starred in the musical stage adaptation of the film The Band's Visit, in the Off-Broadway Atlantic Theatre Company production. The musical, with music and lyrics by David Yazbek and book by Itamar Moses, ran from November 11, 2016, through December 23, 2016. He reprised his role when the show moved to Broadway where it opened at the Ethel Barrymore Theatre on November 9, 2017. For his performance, he won the 2018 Tony Award for Best Actor in a Musical. He also appeared as Walter Franz in the 2017 Broadway revival of The Price.

=== 2017–2023: The Marvelous Mrs. Maisel ===
Shalhoub stars as Jewish-American math professor Abe Weissman, father of protagonist Midge Maisel (Rachel Brosnahan), in the Emmy-winning, Amazon-produced television comedy series The Marvelous Mrs. Maisel. For his performance he won the Primetime Emmy Award for Outstanding Supporting Actor in a Comedy Series and the Screen Actors Guild Award for Outstanding Performance by a Male Actor in a Comedy Series both in 2019. Thelma Adams of TheWrap praised Abe's character development and Shalhoub's performance on the series, writing, "Midge's father — always intelligent, rarely self-aware — has a remarkable epiphany where he finally understands what Midge has accomplished, and how late he is to the party." Cristina Escobar of Roger Ebert.com declared, "[Shalhoub] came close to stealing the show".

He played the character of Fred in the 2021 animated film, Rumble, and reprised his role as Adrian Monk in Mr. Monk's Last Case: A Monk Movie in 2023.

== Personal life ==
Shalhoub married actress Brooke Adams in 1992. They have worked together in several films, in one episode of Wings, and on BrainDead. Adams has appeared credited as a "Special Guest Star" in five episodes of Monk—"Mr. Monk and the Airplane", "Mr. Monk's 100th Case", "Mr. Monk and the Kid", "Mr. Monk Visits a Farm", and "Mr. Monk and the Badge," as well as in Mr. Monk's Last Case. They live in Los Angeles and have a summer cottage on Martha's Vineyard, Massachusetts.

Shalhoub and Adams appeared on Broadway together in the 2010 revival of Lend Me a Tenor. At the time of their wedding, Adams had an adopted daughter, whom Shalhoub adopted. In 1994, they adopted another daughter.

=== Investing ===
Shalhoub is an investor in the Michelin-starred Italian restaurant Rezdôra.

== Acting credits ==
=== Film ===
Year	Title	Role	Notes
1986	Heartburn	Airplane Passenger	Some scenes cut
1989	Longtime Companion	Paul's Doctor	
1990	Quick Change	Taxicab Driver	
1991	Barton Fink	Ben Geisler	
1992	Honeymoon in Vegas	Buddy Walker	
1993	Addams Family Values	Jorge	
1993	Searching for Bobby Fischer	Chess Club Member	
1994	I.Q.	Bob Rosetti	
1996	Big Night	Primo	
1997	A Life Less Ordinary	Al	
1997	Gattaca	German	
1997	Men in Black	Jack Jeebs	
1998	A Civil Action	Kevin Conway	
1998	The Siege	Agent Frank Haddad	
1998	The Impostors	Voltri, First Mate	
1998	Paulie	Misha Belenkoff	
1998	Primary Colors	Eddie Reyes	
1999	Galaxy Quest	Fred Kwan	
1999	The Tic Code	Phil	
2001	Thirteen Ghosts	Arthur Kriticos	
2001	The Man Who Wasn't There	Freddy Riedenschneider	
2001	Spy Kids	Mr. Alexander "Alex" Minion	
2001	Impostor	Nelson Gittes	
2002	Life or Something Like It	Prophet Jack	
2002	Made-Up	Max Hires	Also director
2002	Men in Black II	Jack Jeebs	
2002	Spy Kids 2: The Island of Lost Dreams	Mr. Alexander "Alex" Minion	
2003	Spy Kids 3-D: Game Over	Mr. Alexander "Alex" Minion	
2003	Party Animals	Celebrity Father	
2003	T for Terrorist	Man in White Suit	
2003	Something More	Mr. Avery	
2004	The Last Shot	Tommy Sanz	
2004	Against the Ropes	Sam LaRocca	
2005	The Naked Brothers Band: The Movie	Himself	
2005	The Great New Wonderful	Dr. Trabulous	
2006	Cars	Luigi (voice)	
2007	Careless	Mr. Roth	
2007	AmericanEast	Sam	
2007	1408	Sam Farrell	
2008	L.A. Actors	Bum	
2009	Feed the Fish	Sheriff Anderson	
2010	How Do You Know	Psychiatrist	
2011	Cars 2	Luigi (voice)	
2013	Movie 43	George	Deleted sketch
2013	Pain & Gain	Victor Kershaw	
2014	Teenage Mutant Ninja Turtles	Master Splinter (voice)	
2016	Teenage Mutant Ninja Turtles: Out of the Shadows	Master Splinter (voice)	
2016	Custody	Jason Schulman	
2016	The Assignment	Dr. Ralph Galen	
2017	Breakable You	Adam Weller	
2017	Final Portrait	Diego Giacometti	
2017	Cars 3	Luigi (voice)	
2017	They Shall Not Perish	Karnig Parnian	
2018	Rosy	Dr. Godin	
2021	Rumble	Fred (voice)	
2022	Linoleum	Dr. Alvin	
2023	Flamin' Hot	Roger Enrico	
2025	Play Dirty	Lozini	

=== Television ===
Year	Title	Role	Notes
1986	The Equalizer	Terrorist	Episode: "Breakpoint"
1987	Spenser: For Hire	Dr. Hambrecht	Episode: "The Road Back"
1988	Alone in the Neon Jungle	Nahid	Television film
1989	Money, Power, Murder	Seth Parker	Television film
1989	Day One	Enrico Fermi	Television film
1991	Monsters	Mancini	Episode: "Leavings"
1991–1997	Wings	Antonio Scarpacci	144 episodes
1992	Dinosaurs	Jerry (voice)	Episode: "Fran Live"
1993	Gypsy	Uncle Jocko	Television film
1995	Gargoyles	The Emir (voice)	Episode: "Grief"
1995	The X-Files	Dr. Chester Ray Banton	Episode: "Soft Light"
1996	Radiant City	Narrator	Television film
1996	Frasier	Manu Habib	Episode: "The Focus Group"
1996	Almost Perfect	Alex Thorpe	Episode: "Auto Neurotic"
1997	Men in Black: The Series	Jack Jeebs (voice)	2 episodes
1999	That Championship Season	George Sitkowski	Television film
1999	Ally McBeal	Albert Shepley	Episode: "Those Lips, That Hand"
1999–2000	Stark Raving Mad	Ian Stark	22 episodes
2000	MADtv	Taxi Cab Driver/Himself	2 episodes
2001	The Heart Department	Dr. Joseph Nassar	Television film
2002–2009	Monk	Adrian Monk	Lead role (125 episodes)
2011	Too Big to Fail	John Mack	Television film
2011	Five	Mitch Taylor	Television film
2012	Hemingway & Gellhorn	Koltsov	Television film
2013	We Are Men	Frank Russo	7 episodes
2013–2014	Cars Toons: Tales from Radiator Springs	Luigi (voice)	3 episodes
2015	Nurse Jackie	Dr. Bernard Prince	8 episodes
2016	The Blacklist	Alistair Pitt	Episode: "Alistair Pitt (No. 103)"
2016	BrainDead	Red Wheatus	Main role (13 episodes)
2017–2023	The Marvelous Mrs. Maisel	Abe Weissman	43 episodes
2017	Mickey and the Roadster Racers	Luigi (voice)	Episode: "Roaming Around Rome"
2019–2020	Elena of Avalor	Zopilote (voice)	6 episodes
2020	Peacock Presents: The At-Home Variety Show Featuring Seth MacFarlane	Adrian Monk	Episode: "Monk in Quarantine"
2020–2022	Central Park	Marvin (voice)	7 episodes
2022	Cars on the Road	Luigi (voice)	Episode: "Dino Park"
2023	The Company You Keep	Frankie Musso	2 episodes
2023	Mr. Monk's Last Case: A Monk Movie	Adrian Monk	Television film
2025	Breaking Bread	Himself	CNN documentary series
2027	Cars: Lightning Racers	Luigi (voice)	Upcoming series
2027	Einstein	Jack Einstein	Upcoming series

=== Stage ===
Year	Title	Role	Venue
1980	As You Like It	Oliver	American Repertory Theater
1980	The Berlin Requiem and The Seven Deadly Sins	Paddle Wheel/Boss/Horse	American Repertory Theater
1980	Lulu	Ferdinand/Casti-Piani	American Repertory Theater
1981	Has "Washington" Legs?	Wesley	American Repertory Theater
1981	The Marriage of Figaro	Figaro	American Repertory Theater
1981	Sganarelle- An evening of Molière farces	Alcidas/Lélie/Leandre	American Repertory Theater
1982	The Journey of the Fifth Horse	Pandalevski/Bizmionkov	American Repertory Theater
1982	Rundown	Spear	American Repertory Theater
1982	Three Sisters	Solyony	American Repertory Theater
1983	Waiting for Godot	Pozzo	American Repertory Theater
1983	The Boys from Syracuse	Sergeant	American Repertory Theater
1983	Baby with the Bathwater	Father/Voice of Psychologist	American Repertory Theater
1983	The School for Scandal	Joseph Surface	American Repertory Theater
1983	Measure for Measure	Angelo	American Repertory Theater
1984	Six Characters in Search of an Author	The Son	American Repertory Theater
1984	Holy Wars: Morocco and The Road to Jerusalem	Mr. Kempler/Ari	American Repertory Theater
1986	The Odd Couple	Jesus Costazuela	Broadhurst Theatre
1987	Richard II	Sir William Bagot	Shakespeare in the Park
1987	Henry IV, Part 1	Poins/Sir Richard Vernon	Shakespeare in the Park
1988	Zero Positive	Patrick	The Public Theater
1988	Rameau's Nephew	Lui	Classic Stage Company
1988	For Dear Life	Jake	The Public Theater
1989	The Heidi Chronicles	Scoop Rosenbaum (replacement)	Plymouth Theatre
1992	Conversations with My Father	Charlie	Royale Theatre
1997	The Old Neighborhood	Bobby	American Repertory Theater
2007	The Scene	Charlie	Second Stage Theatre
2010	Lend Me a Tenor	Henry Saunders	Music Box Theatre
2012	Golden Boy	Mr. Bonaparte	Belasco Theatre
2014	Act One	Moss Hart, Barnett Hart, George S. Kaufman	Vivian Beaumont Theatre
2015	The Mystery of Love and Sex	Howard	Mitzi E. Newhouse Theater
2015	Happy Days	Willie	The Flea Theater
2016	The Band's Visit	Tewfiq Zakaria	Atlantic Theater Company
2017	The Price	Walter Franz	American Airlines Theatre
2017	The Band's Visit	Tewfiq Zakaria	Ethel Barrymore Theatre
2024	What Became Of Us	Z	Atlantic Theater Company
2026	Antigone (This Play I Read in High School)	Creon	The Public Theater

=== Video games ===
Year	Title	Voice role
1997	Fallout: A Post-Nuclear Role-Playing Game	Aradesh
2006	Cars	Luigi
2007	Cars Mater-National Championship	Luigi
2009	Cars Race-O-Rama	Luigi
2011	Cars 2	Luigi

=== Producer ===
Year	Title	Notes
2003–09	Monk	125 episodes
2005	Mush	Short film
2009	Pet Peeves	Short film
2009	Feed the Fish	
