= Bitty Schram =

American actress

- Born: 1968 or 1969 (age 57–58)
- Education: University of Maryland
- Occupation: Actress
- Years active: 1992–2016

Bitty Schram (born 1968 or 1969) is an American actress who played Sharona Fleming in the television series Monk and Evelyn Gardner in the film A League of Their Own (1992).

== Early life ==
Schram is from Mountainside, New Jersey, and she attended Jonathan Dayton High School, where she was a competitive athlete. She studied at the University of Maryland, College Park on a tennis scholarship and graduated with a degree in advertising design. Bitty was a nickname she decided to use when she became an actress. Schram is Jewish.

== Career ==
The role that initially brought her fame was Evelyn Gardner, the Rockford Peaches' right fielder, in the Penny Marshall film A League of Their Own. Her character was the recipient of the classic admonition by manager Jimmy Dugan (Tom Hanks), "There's no crying in baseball!" Her character was also the mother of the obnoxious little boy, Stilwell.

During 1993–1995, she appeared in the original Broadway production of Neil Simon's Laughter on the 23rd Floor.

In 2002, Schram landed a major role opposite Tony Shalhoub on the USA Network series Monk. She was released midway through the show's third season. The network stated it had "decided to go in a different creative direction with some of its characters." The Hollywood Reporter reported that "some members of the series' supporting cast, including Schram, Ted Levine and Jason Gray-Stanford, attempted to renegotiate the terms of their contract[s]" and cited Schram's departure as evidence of the industry's "hard line against raise-seeking actors who aren't absolutely essential to the show." Levine and Gray-Stanford remained on the show. Natalie Teeger, played by Traylor Howard, replaced Schram's character as Monk's assistant. Schram made a guest appearance on one episode of the show's eighth and final season, titled "Mr. Monk and Sharona".

== Filmography ==
=== Film ===
Year	Title	Role	Notes
1992	Fathers & Sons	Terry	
1992	A League of Their Own	Evelyn Gardner	
1993	The Night We Never Met	Pharmacy Clerk	
1993	My Family Treasure	Young Alexandra	
1994	Chasers	Flo	
1994	Full Cycle	Sofie	
1996	Caught	Amy	
1996	The Pallbearer	Lauren	
1996	Marvin's Room	Janine	
1996	One Fine Day	Marla	
1998	Kissing a Fool	Vicki Pelam	
1998	Cleopatra's Second Husband	Hallie Marrs	
2001	The Tag	Gina	Short
2002	Unconditional Love	Waitress	
2004	The Sure Hand of God	Christine Bigbee	
2006	A-List	Samantha	
2016	Moments of Clarity	Officer Lori	Nominated–Maverick Movie Awards for Best Ensemble Acting (Feature)

=== Television ===
Year	Title	Role	Notes
1995	Episode: Long Island Fever	Penny	TV film
1999	G vs E	Ani	Episode: "Gee Your Hair Smells Evil"
2001	Destiny		TV film
2001	Strong Medicine	Juno Bouvoir	Episode: "Fix"
2001	Roswell	Bunny	Episode: "Secrets and Lies"
2001–2002	Felicity	Rita	Episodes: "Moving On", "A Perfect Match", "The Paper Chase"
2002–2005, 2009	Monk	Sharona Fleming	Regular Seasons 1–3, Guest Season 8 Nominated–Golden Globe Award for Best Performance by an Actress in a Television Series (Comedy or Musical)
2005	Kitchen Confidential	Reese Ryder	Episode: "Exile on Main Street"
2006	Thief	Lila Granville	TV miniseries
2007	You've Got a Friend	Jackie Nelson	TV film
2009	Ghost Whisperer	Jody	Episode: "This Joint's Haunted"
