= Jason Gray-Stanford =

Canadian actor (born 1970)

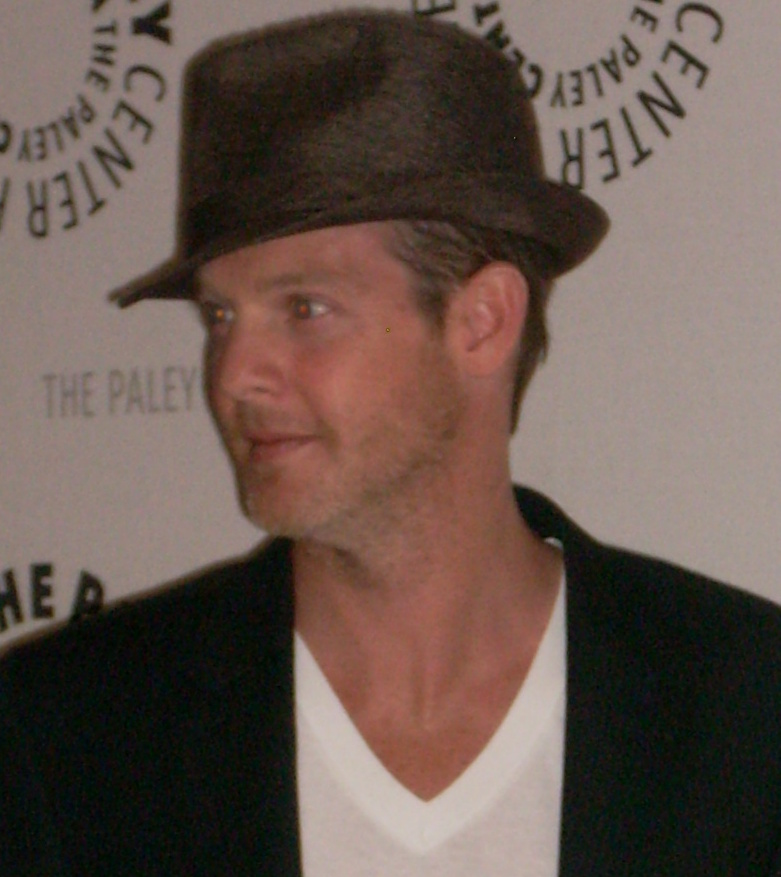
- Gray-Stanford in 2008
- Born: May 19, 1970 (age 56); Vancouver, British Columbia, Canada
- Other name: Jason Gray Standford
- Citizenship: Canada; United States
- Education: University of British Columbia
- Occupation: Actor
- Years active: 1992–present
- Spouse: Jes Macallan (m. 2012; div. 2017)

Jason Gray-Stanford (born May 19, 1970) is a Canadian actor. He is best known for playing Lieutenant Randy Disher in the USA Network television series Monk and for voicing Raditz in the Ocean Productions dub of Dragon Ball Z.

== Career ==
Gray-Stanford earned a BFA degree from the University of British Columbia in theatre. He has done extensive voice-over work for various Japanese anime films and series, and also contributed background vocals to Russell Crowe's 30 Odd Foot of Grunts album Gaslight.

He played Deputy Bobby Michan in Mystery Alaska and appeared in A Beautiful Mind, both starring Crowe. Other notable film credits include Flags of our Fathers, Earth to Echo, The Miracle Season, Caroline and Jackie, Lonely Hearts, and Summer of 84.

While mostly known for his role in the series Monk, he has also had several notable television appearances, including Monday Mornings, Grey's Anatomy, Justified, The X-Files, Bones, the NCIS and Stargate franchises, the series Republic of Doyle, and The Boys.

Among his many voice-over performances, Gray-Stanford voiced the roles of Donatello in Ninja Turtles: The Next Mutation and Sherlock Holmes in Sherlock Holmes in the 22nd Century. He was also the voice of Kento Rei Faun in the anime Ronin Warriors, the original English voice of Raditz and Cui in the Ocean Group dub of Dragon Ball Z, and the voice of Shinnosuke in the English dub of Ranma ½ and Joe Higashi in the Fatal Fury OVAs and film. Gray-Stanford is also recognized as the original voice of Yusaku Godai in Maison Ikkoku.

== Personal life ==
Gray-Stanford was married to Jes Macallan from 2012 to 2017.

In 2018, Gray-Stanford was diagnosed with an arrhythmia in his heart, which was controlled for several years with medications and other treatments. In November 2020, he underwent a successful heart transplant. Doctors told him afterwards that he would have probably lived for only a few more weeks without the transplant.

He became an American citizen in 2019.

== Filmography ==
Year	Title	Role	Other Notes
1992	Neon Rider	Daniel	Episode: "Daniel"
1993	The Commish	Dave	Episode: "Dead Cadet's Society"
1993	The X-Files	1947 Police Officer	Episode: "The Jersey Devil"
1994	The Commish	Dave	Episode: "Dead Cadet's Society"
1994	Highlander	Jonah	Episode: "The Cross of St. Antoine"
1994	Green Legend Ran	Ran	Anime dub voice; straight-to-video
1994	Fatal Fury: Legend of the Hungry Wolf	Joe Higashi	Anime dub voice; straight-to-video
1995	Dangerous Indiscretion	Video Store Clerk	
1995	The Surrogate	Curtis	TV movie
1995	Ronin Warriors	Gash/Kento	Anime dub voice; TV
1995	Ranma ½	Shinnosuke	Anime dub voice; straight-to-video (2 OVAs)
1995	M.A.N.T.I.S.	Student #1	Episode: "The Delusionist"
1995	Sliders	Bellhop	Episode: "Luck of the Draw"
1995	Strange Luck	First Year Intern	Episode: "The Liver Wild"
1995	Fatal Fury 2: The New Battle	Joe Higashi	Anime dub voice; straight-to-video
1995	Fatal Fury: The Motion Picture	Joe Higashi	Anime dub voice; straight-to-video
1995–1996	Ogre Slayer	Ogre Slayer	Anime dub voice; straight-to-video
1996	Key the Metal Idol	Tsukiyama	Anime dub voice; straight-to-video
1996	Please Save My Earth	Haruhiko Kazama/Shukaido	Anime dub voice; straight-to-video
1996	The Sentinel	Deputy Matheson	Episode: "Reunion"
1996	Pocket Dragon Adventures	Zoom-Zoom	Episode 1
1996–1998	Dragon Ball Z	Raditz/Cui	Anime dub voice; TV (8 Episodes)
1996, 1998	The Outer Limits	Airman/Dylan Venable	2 Episodes
1996–1999	Maison Ikkoku	Yusaku Godai	Anime dub voice; straight-to-video (Episodes 1-36)
1997	Doomsday Rock	Sgt. Thompson	TV movie
1997	Contagious	E.R. Doctor #3	TV movie
1997	Hostile Force	Arne	TV movie
1997	Extreme Dinosaurs	Bullzeye	Voice; all episodes
1997	The Adventures of Snowden the Snowman	Snowden	Voice
1997	Grey: Digital Target	Mei	Voice
1997–1998	Saban's Ninja Turtles: The Next Mutation	Donatello	Voice; 26 Episodes
1998	The Escape	Young Guard	TV movie
1998	Mummies Alive! The Legend Begins	(additional voices)	Straight-to-video
1998	The Mighty Kong	Ricky	Voice; straight-to-video
1998	Poltergeist: The Legacy	Bob Meyer	Episode: "Debt of Honor"
1998	Millennium	Kyle	Episode: "Closure"
1998	Snowden: Raggedy Ann and Andy's Adventure	Snowden	Voice
1998	Fat Dog Mendoza	Teen Robot Guy	Voice
1998	Camelot: The Legend	Gilly	Voice
1998	Stories From My Childhood	Various Characters	Voice; Episode: "Pinocchio"
1999	Mystery, Alaska	Bobby Michan	
1999	Stargate SG-1	Orner	Episode: "Past and Present"
1999–2001	Sherlock Holmes in the 22nd Century	Sherlock Holmes	Voice
2000	Harsh Realm	Lieutenant	Episode: "Three Percenters"
2000	First Wave	Willet	Episode: "Still at Large"
2000	Queer as Folk	Brian's First Trick	Episode: "Pilot"
2000	Cold Squad	Kevin Nixon	Episode: "Court Appeal"
2001	Last Wedding	Matthew	
2001	A Beautiful Mind	Ainsley	
2002	Taken	Howard Bowen	3 Episodes
2002–2009	Monk	Lt. Randall Disher	124 Episodes
2005	The Collector	Larry Emmerich	Episode: "The Superhero"
2006	Lonely Hearts	Officer Chetnick	
2006	Flags of Our Fathers	Lieutenant Schrier	
2007	Lost in the Dark	Roy Evans	TV movie
2008	Puppy Love	Andy	
2008	Upstaged		Video short
2009	Convict	Officer Nelson	
2010	Outlaw	Victor Harmon	2 episodes
2011	Grey's Anatomy	Josh Englander	Episode: "Golden Hour"
2011	Being Bin Laden	Amir	TV movie
2011	Lucky Christmas	Mike Ronowski	TV movie
2012	Caroline and Jackie	James	
2012	NCIS	Dr. Jay Berman	Episode: "Up in Smoke"
2013	Phantom	Sasha	
2013	Monday Mornings	Atty. Scott Henderson	5 episodes
2013	The Husband She Met Online	Craig Miller	TV movie
2014	Justified	Dylan "Dyllie" Crowe	Episode: "A Murder of Crowes"
2014	Red Sky	Arliss Skidmore	
2014	Earth to Echo	Dr. Lawrence Masden	
2014	Mistresses	FBI Agent Adam Thomas	5 episodes
2014	Republic of Doyle	Blake Brogan	7 episodes
2015	Pearly Gates	The Assistant	
2015	Bones	Roger Flender	2 episodes
2015	NCIS: New Orleans	Mickey	Episode: "Darkest Hour"
2016	Travelers	Aaron Donner	Episode: "Donner"
2016	Supergirl	Rand O'Reilly	Episode: "Changing"
2018	The X-Files	Rick Eggers	Episode: "Familiar"
2018	Summer of 84	Randall Armstrong	
2018	The Miracle Season	Scott Sanders	
2020	Peacock Presents: The At-Home Variety Show Featuring Seth MacFarlane	Lt. Randall Disher	Episode: "Monk In Quarantine"
2020	The Boys	Dennis	Episode: "The Bloody Doors Off"
2023	Mr. Monk's Last Case: A Monk Movie	Lt. Randall Disher	TV movie
2023	Percy Jackson and the Olympians	Maron	Episode: "I Become Supreme Lord of the Bathroom"
2024	The Painter	Niles	
2024	Murder in a Small Town	Blake Windsor	Episode: "Prized Possessions"
2025	The Irrational	Captain Nick Copetti	Episode: "Ghost Ship"
2026	Run Hide Fight: Infidels	George Huber	
