= List of awards and nominations received by Monk =

This is the list of awards and nominations received by the television series Monk (2002–2009), starring Tony Shalhoub.

== Major awards ==
=== Emmy Awards ===
Year	Category	Nominee(s) / Episode	Result
2003	Outstanding Lead Actor in a Comedy Series	Tony Shalhoub	Won
2003	Outstanding Main Title Theme Music	Jeff Beal	Won
2004	Outstanding Lead Actor – Comedy Series	Tony Shalhoub	Nominated
2004	Outstanding Casting – Comedy Series		Nominated
2004	Outstanding Guest Actor in a Comedy Series	John Turturro / "Mr. Monk and the Three Pies"	Won
2004	Outstanding Main Title Theme Music	Randy Newman	Won
2005	Outstanding Lead Actor in a Comedy Series	Tony Shalhoub	Won
2005	Outstanding Directing for a Comedy Series	Randall Zisk / "Mr. Monk Takes His Medicine"	Nominated
2006	Outstanding Lead Actor in a Comedy Series	Tony Shalhoub	Won
2006	Outstanding Guest Actress in a Comedy Series	Laurie Metcalf / "Mr. Monk Bumps His Head"	Nominated
2007	Outstanding Lead Actor in a Comedy Series	Tony Shalhoub	Nominated
2007	Outstanding Guest Actor – Comedy Series	Stanley Tucci / "Mr. Monk and the Actor"	Won
2008	Outstanding Lead Actor in a Comedy Series	Tony Shalhoub	Nominated
2008	Outstanding Guest Actress – Comedy Series	Sarah Silverman / "Mr. Monk and His Biggest Fan"	Nominated
2009	Outstanding Lead Actor in a Comedy Series	Tony Shalhoub	Nominated
2009	Outstanding Guest Actress in a Comedy Series	Gena Rowlands / "Mr. Monk and the Lady Next Door"	Nominated
2010	Outstanding Lead Actor in a Comedy Series	Tony Shalhoub / "Mr. Monk and the End"	Nominated
2010	Outstanding Original Music And Lyrics	Randy Newman for "When I'm Gone" / "Mr. Monk and the End (Part Two)"	Won

=== Golden Globe Awards ===
Year	Category	Nominee	Result
2003	Best Actor – Musical or Comedy Series	Tony Shalhoub	Won
2004	Best Series – Musical or Comedy	—	Nominated
2004	Best Actor – Musical or Comedy Series	Tony Shalhoub	Nominated
2004	Best Actor – Musical or Comedy Series	Tony Shalhoub	Nominated
2005	Best Actor – Musical or Comedy Series	Tony Shalhoub	Nominated
2007	Best Actor – Musical or Comedy Series	Tony Shalhoub	Nominated
2009	Best Actor – Musical or Comedy Series	Tony Shalhoub	Nominated

=== Screen Actors Guild Awards ===
Year	Category	Nominee	Result
2003	Outstanding Performance by a Male Actor in a Comedy Series	Tony Shalhoub	Nominated
2004	Outstanding Performance by a Male Actor in a Comedy Series	Tony Shalhoub	Won
2005	Outstanding Performance by a Male Actor in a Comedy Series	Tony Shalhoub	Won
2007	Outstanding Performance by a Male Actor in a Comedy Series	Tony Shalhoub	Nominated
2008	Outstanding Performance by a Male Actor in a Comedy Series	Tony Shalhoub	Nominated
2009	Outstanding Performance by a Male Actor in a Comedy Series	Tony Shalhoub	Nominated
2010	Outstanding Performance by a Male Actor in a Comedy Series	Tony Shalhoub	Nominated

== Other awards ==
=== ASCAP Awards ===
Year	Category	Nominee	Result	Ref.
2005	Top TV Series	Randy Newman	Won	

=== Family Television Awards ===
Year	Category	Nominee	Result	Ref.
2006	Best Actor	Tony Shalhoub	Won	

=== Gracie Allen Awards ===
Year	Category	Nominee	Result	Ref.
2009	Outstanding Supporting Actress – Comedy Series	Traylor Howard	Won	

=== PRISM Awards ===
Year	Category	Nominee	Result	Ref.
2007	Outstanding Actor in a Comedy Series	Tony Shalhoub	Nominated	
2010	Outstanding Actor in a Comedy Series	Tony Shalhoub	Won	

=== Satellite Awards ===
Year	Category	Nominee	Result	Ref.
2004	Best Actor – Musical or Comedy Series	Tony Shalhoub	Nominated	
2005	Best Actor – Musical or Comedy Series	Tony Shalhoub	Nominated	

=== Television Critics Association Awards ===
Year	Category	Nominee	Result	Ref.
2003	Individual Achievement in Comedy	Tony Shalhoub	Nominated	

=== Young Artist Awards ===
Year	Category	Nominee / Episode	Result	Ref.
2003	Best Performance in a TV Series (Comedy or Drama) – Supporting Young Actor	Max Morrow	Nominated	
2007	Best Performance in a TV Series (Comedy or Drama) – Guest Starring Young Actress	Rachel Rogers / "Mr. Monk Meets His Dad"	Nominated	
