= Monk season 8 =

Season of television series

Monk
- Season 8
- DVD cover
- Starring: Tony Shalhoub Traylor Howard Ted Levine Jason Gray-Stanford
- No. of episodes: 16

Release
- Original network: USA Network
- Original release: August 7 – December 4, 2009

Season chronology
- ← Previous; Season 7

The eighth and final season of Monk originally aired in the United States on USA Network from August 7 to December 4, 2009. It consisted of 16 episodes. Tony Shalhoub, Traylor Howard, Ted Levine, and Jason Gray-Stanford reprised their roles as the main characters. A DVD of the season was released on March 16, 2010.

== Crew ==
Andy Breckman continued his tenure as show runner. Executive producers for the season included Breckman, David Hoberman, series star Tony Shalhoub, writer Tom Scharpling, and Rob Thompson. Universal Media Studios was the primary production company backing the show. Randy Newman's theme ("It's a Jungle Out There") continued to be used, while Jeff Beal's original instrumental theme could be heard in some episodes. Newman also wrote a song for the final episode entitled When I'm Gone. The song was accompanied by a montage of past and present characters from the show, leading the series into the final end credits. Directors for the season included Randall Zisk, Michael Zinberg, David Breckman, and Andrei Belgrader. Dean Parisot returned to direct "Mr. Monk and the Badge". It was his only credit in the series, apart from the pilot episode. Writers for the season included Michael Angeli, Andy Breckman, David Breckman, Hy Conrad, Tom Gammill, Dylan Morgan, Max Pross, Salvatore Savo, Josh Siegal, Joe Toplyn, Tom Scharpling, and Peter Wolk.

== Cast ==
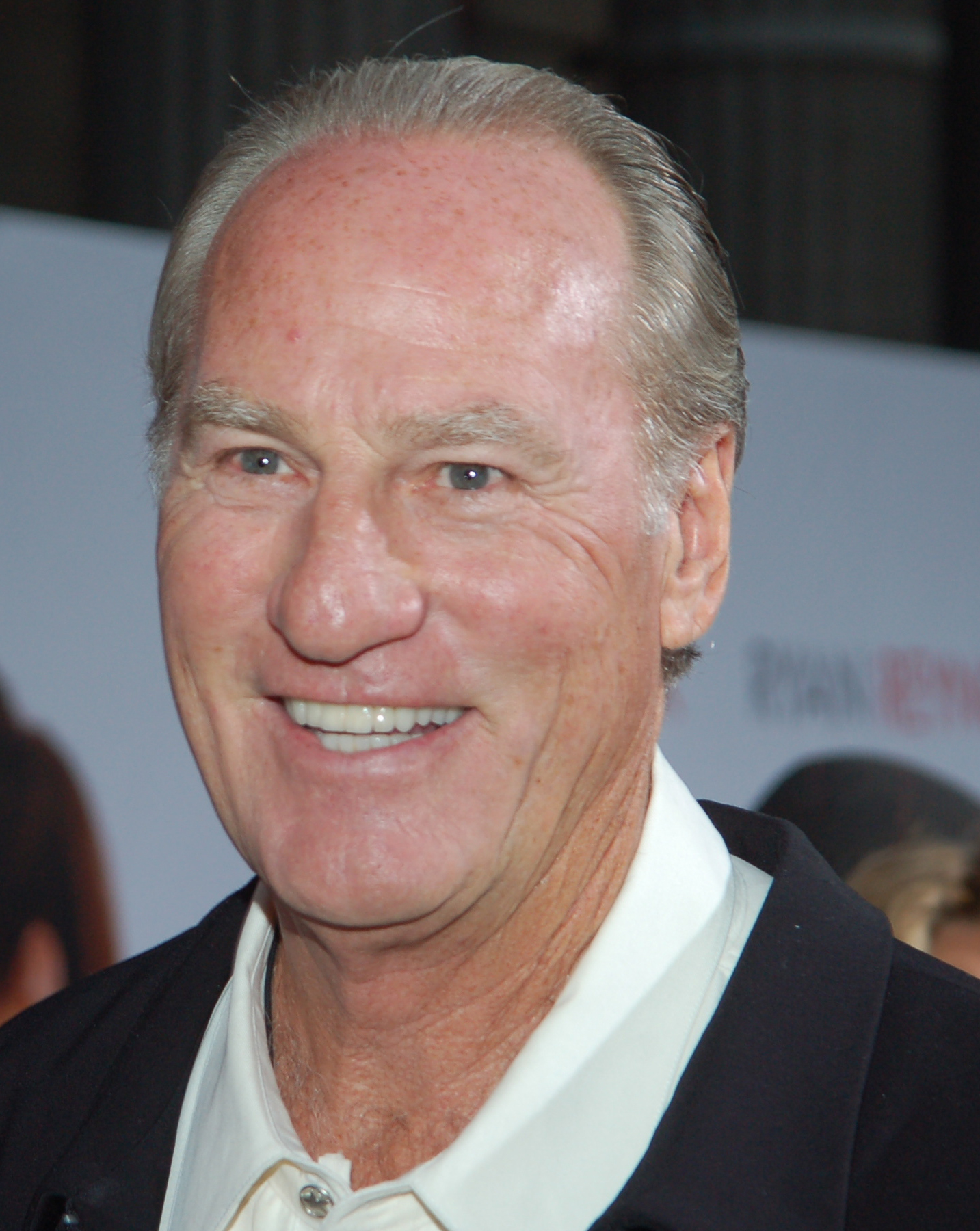
Craig T. Nelson made a guest appearance in the final two episodes as Judge Ethan Rickover

All four main characters returned for the final season. Tony Shalhoub returned as former homicide detective Adrian Monk, with Traylor Howard returning as Monk's faithful assistant, Natalie Teeger. Ted Levine returned as the SFPD captain, Leland Stottlemeyer, and Jason Gray-Stanford reprised his role as the lovable but oblivious Lieutenant Randy Disher.

Hector Elizondo returned as Monk's new psychiatrist, Dr. Neven Bell. Emmy Clarke continued to portray Julie Teeger. Virginia Madsen entered the series as Stottlemeyer's new girlfriend (and later wife), Trudy K. Jensen. Melora Hardin reprised her role as Trudy Monk (Monk's deceased wife), and Casper Van Dien returned as Lt. Steven Albright, Natalie's new love interest. Tim Bagley returned to resolve Harold Krenshaw's (Monk's number-one rival) plotline. Craig T. Nelson entered as Judge Ethan Rickover in the penultimate episode. D. B. Woodside entered in the same episode as Monk's physician, Dr. Matthew Shuler. Alona Tal made an appearance in the final episode as Trudy's daughter, Molly Evans. Bitty Schram made a special appearance as Sharona Fleming, Monk's former nurse (Schram was a former cast member, who left during the third season). Other guest stars for the eighth season included Brooke Adams, Adewale Akinnuoye-Agbaje, Sarah Aldrich, Dylan Baker, Eric Balfour, Ed Begley, Jr., Jack Betts, Kelly Carlson, Ian Paul Cassidy, Shelly Cole, Vince Curatola, Reed Diamond, Mary Beth Evans, Michael Fairman, Mark Harelik, Jesse Heiman, Carol Kane, Bernie Kopell, Wallace Langham, Meat Loaf, Louis Lombardi, John Carroll Lynch, Jay Malone, Jack McGee, Lex Medlin, Jay Mohr, Elizabeth Perkins, Teri Polo, Sarah Rush, Rena Sofer, Daniel Stern, Eric Stonestreet, Karen Strassman, Jack Wagner, Gary Weeks, Christina Vidal, Chandra West, Wade Williams, and Alex Wolff.

== Episodes ==
No. overall	No. in season	Title	Directed by	Written by	Original release date	U.S. viewers (millions)
110	1	"Mr. Monk's Favorite Show"	Randall Zisk	Jack Bernstein	August 7, 2009	5.14
The wholesome child star of Monk's favorite childhood television show has grown into a very different woman (Elizabeth Perkins) who needs his help—partially as her undercover bodyguard—after her tell-all memoir invites attempts on her life. Also guest stars Cameron Monaghan.
111	2	"Mr. Monk and the Foreign Man"	David Grossman	Story by : David Breckman and Justin Brenneman; Teleplay by : David Breckman	August 14, 2009	5.31
Monk finds himself increasingly drawn to a case involving a visiting Nigerian man (Adewale Akinnuoye-Agbaje) who is investigating his beloved wife's hit-and-run death–a case that strongly resonates with Monk.
112	3	"Mr. Monk and the UFO"	Kevin Hooks	Michael Angeli	August 21, 2009	5.16
Stuck in a small Nevada desert town when their car breaks down, Monk and Natalie join a local sheriff (Daniel Stern) investigating whether a woman's death on a hiking trail ties to a recent UFO sighting.
113	4	"Mr. Monk Is Someone Else"	Randall Zisk	Salvatore Savo	August 28, 2009	4.98
At the behest of an FBI agent (Reed Diamond), Monk assumes the identity of his doppelganger–a deceased hit man–in an effort to foil a mob execution that makes no sense: the target is a nondescript old man. Also guest stars Vincent Curatola, Eric Balfour, and Kelly Carlson.
114	5	"Mr. Monk Takes the Stand"	Mary Lou Belli	Josh Siegal and Dylan Morgan	September 11, 2009	4.82
Monk ponders retirement after an aggressive defense attorney (Jay Mohr) shreds his phobias and unconventional methods in court, helping a murderer go free. Also guest stars Jonathan Lipnicki.
115	6	"Mr. Monk and the Critic"	Jerry Levine	Hy Conrad	September 18, 2009	4.88
Natalie suspects a critic (Dylan Baker) of killing a young waitress at a hotel—a critic Monk thinks Natalie obsesses over after he panned Julie's performance in a play. Also guest stars Bernie Kopell.
116	7	"Mr. Monk and the Voodoo Curse"	Andrei Belgrader	Joe Toplyn	September 25, 2009	4.74
Unmarked voodoo dolls arrive to three unrelated people predicting their deaths accurately—then Natalie receives one predicting she'll die by decapitation, leading Monk to enlist the doll shop owner (Meat Loaf) to help find the actual killer.
117	8	"Mr. Monk Goes to Group Therapy"	Anton Cropper	Joe Ventura	October 9, 2009	4.37
Monk's insurance won't pay for more individual therapy sessions, so he joins Dr. Bell's therapy group—one of whom seems to be killing fellow patients one at a time, until Monk and Harold Krenshaw (Tim Bagley) suspect each other. Also guest stars Amy Aquino.
118	9	"Happy Birthday, Mr. Monk"	Tawnia McKiernan	Peter Wolk	October 16, 2009	3.98
Natalie tries to throw Monk a surprise birthday party as he investigates the mysterious death of an office building janitor thrown down a trash compactor, while Stottlemeyer begins dating a writer (Virginia Madsen). Also guest stars John Carroll Lynch.
119	10	"Mr. Monk and Sharona"	Randall Zisk	Tom Scharpling	October 23, 2009	5.42
Sharona Fleming (Bitty Schram) returns to San Francisco to handle legal issues related to her distant uncle Howie's recent death, which occurred when he fell down a flight of flagstone steps on a golf course. But when Monk sees photos of the accident, he determines that there has been foul play, to Sharona's consternation. Monk soon finds himself torn by the fact that Natalie's and Sharona's ways of working with him are so different. Also guest stars Jack Wagner.
120	11	"Mr. Monk and the Dog"	David Breckman	Beth Armogida	October 30, 2009	4.69
Monk reluctantly adopts a dog while looking into the suspicious disappearance of its owner—an artist (Marguerite Moreau) who turns up murdered—and finds an unexpected bond with the pet while he solves the crime. Also guest stars Wallace Langham.
121	12	"Mr. Monk Goes Camping"	Joe Pennella	Tom Gammill and Max Pross	November 6, 2009	4.26
To woo the lone holdout on the reinstatement committee (Wade Williams), Monk accompanies Lieutenant Disher on a scouting trip with the man's troublesome son (Alex Wolff), where nature is not the only thing the troop has to fear.
122	13	"Mr. Monk Is the Best Man"	Michael Zinberg	Joe Toplyn and Josh Siegal and Dylan Morgan	November 13, 2009	4.39
While investigating the charred corpse of a shooting victim found in a park, Monk must figure out who is making anonymous threats against Captain Stottlemeyer and his fiancée (Virginia Madsen) on the eve of their wedding. Also guest stars Teri Polo and Carol Kane.
123	14	"Mr. Monk and the Badge"	Dean Parisot	Tom Scharpling and Hy Conrad	November 20, 2009	5.30
Monk is reinstated to the police force at last. But he finds it more than he can handle, after a rookie officer is murdered after catching a serial killer, and Monk suspects the officer's death is tied to the informant who helped expose the murderer. Guest stars Mark Harelik.
124	15	"Mr. Monk and the End (Part One)"	Randall Zisk	Andy Breckman	November 27, 2009	5.82
After Monk returns to private consultation, he and Stottlemeyer discover a doctor (Ed Begley, Jr.) murdered near the location where Monk first learned of Trudy's (Melora Hardin) murder. Monk hunts a man, Kazarinski (John Edward Lee), he believes is involved, who is also targeting Monk, and Natalie is reunited with her late husband's Navy friend Lt. Albright (Casper Van Dien). After Monk is poisoned during dinner, his friends race against time to find an antidote. Stottlemeyer chases Kazarinski from a railroad station to a train yard where Kazarinski is killed by a swift-moving train, complicating the race for the antidote. Monk finally opens his last Christmas gift from Trudy and gets a jarring surprise. Also guest stars Craig T. Nelson.
125	16	"Mr. Monk and the End (Part Two)"	Randall Zisk	Andy Breckman	December 4, 2009	9.44
Monk finally watches a videotape Trudy left behind that points to her killer—Judge Ethan Rickover (Craig T. Nelson), freshly nominated to the state Supreme Court, who killed the doctor and the midwife he feared would expose his affair with Trudy before she met Monk, an affair that produced a baby girl falsely presumed dead. While Monk is going over clippings in the hospital, Natalie and Lt. Albright are cleaning his apartment and discover that Monk was poisoned by a tainted wipe when Natalie starts exhibiting the same symptoms. They call Disher who make their way to the hospital to give Monk the antidote, but find he escaped and is pursuing Rickover. When the police arrive, Monk is holding Rickover at gunpoint and forcing him to dig in his front yard. They discover that the midwife's skeleton is buried there, but before they can apprehend the judge, he kills himself with his last words being, "Take care of her." With the mystery of Trudy's death finally solved, life for everyone continues. Natalie now dates Lt. Albright. Lt. Disher moves to Summit, New Jersey, to become chief of police and have a relationship with Sharona Fleming. Having solved Trudy's murder, Monk conquers most of his phobias, then meets, and begins to forge a relationship with his newly discovered stepdaughter, Molly (Alona Tal), a movie critic who convinces him to continue his police consulting work.

== Awards and nominations ==
=== Emmy Awards ===
- Primetime Emmy Award for Outstanding Lead Actor - Comedy Series (Tony Shalhoub, nominated)
- Primetime Emmy Award for Outstanding Original Music and Lyrics (Randy Newman, won)

=== Screen Actors Guild ===
- Outstanding Actor – Comedy Series (Tony Shalhoub, nominated)
