= The Good Cop =

The Good Cop may refer to:

- The Good Cop (American TV series)
- The Good Cop (Israeli TV series)
- Good Cop, a BBC TV series

== See also ==
- One Good Cop
- Good cop bad cop (disambiguation)
