= The Misery Index (game show) =

American game show

- Genre: Game show
- Created by: Ben Newmark; Dan Newmark; Andy Breckman
- Presented by: Jameela Jamil
- Starring: Brian Quinn; James Murray; Joe Gatto; Sal Vulcano
- Country of origin: United States
- Original language: English
- No. of seasons: 3
- No. of episodes: 50

Production
- Executive producers: Ben Newmark; Dan Newmark; Adam Bold; Andy Breckman; Vin Rubino; Rob Anderson; Howard Klein; Brian Quinn; Joe Gatto; James Murray; Sal Vulcano
- Running time: 20 minutes
- Production companies: Grandma's House Entertainment; Andy Breckman Productions; 3 Arts Entertainment

Original release
- Network: TBS
- Release: October 22, 2019 – March 23, 2021

The Misery Index is an American television comedy game show developed for TBS that premiered on October 22, 2019. The show, based on the card game "Shit Happens," is hosted by Jameela Jamil, and stars the four members of The Tenderloins comedy troupe who also star in truTV's Impractical Jokers.

Andy Breckman, who created and wrote the TV shows Monk and The Good Cop, created the card game "Shit Happens" for his company Uncle Andy Toys. He developed the TV version with Ben & Dan Newmark of Grandma's House Entertainment.

The show features two competing teams, each composed of a non-celebrity contestant and two members of the Tenderloins, who will "attempt to determine the ranking of hilarious and miserable real-life events--from getting fired to accidentally sexting your grandfather--on a scale of 1–100." Michael Bloom, a senior vice president for TBS, said about the show's premise: "Andy Breckman and the Newmarks have hilariously gamified embarrassment, humiliation, and total misery."

Executive producers for the series are Breckman, the Newmark brothers of Grandma's House Entertainment, Howard Klein of 3 Arts Entertainment, Rob Anderson, and showrunner Vin Rubino. The series has run for three seasons so far; the first consisted of ten half-hour episodes, while the second consisted of twenty. In 2020, the series was renewed for a third season which premiered on January 26, 2021.

During the July 6, 2022, episode of Talk Is Jericho, podcast titled "The Impractical Jokers Appreciation Society" Vulcano commented that the show was "unceremoniously" not renewed by TBS but that he hoped it could come back at some point.

== Gameplay ==
The main game consists of three rounds that involve rating and ranking miserable true stories. Ratings are on a numerical scale of 1 to 100, as determined by a panel of psychologists, and are based on the "Three Pillars of Misery": physical pain, emotional trauma, and long-term psychological impact. At the start of each episode, each contestant relates a story of his/her own whose rating is never revealed.

=== Round 1: Misery Lane ===
Two hypothetical situations are presented to the teams, and the contestant whose story has earned the higher Misery Index rating from the panel plays first. Each team must decide whether its contestant's story falls above, below, or between the two situations; a correct choice wins $500.

=== Round 2: More or Less Miserable ===
The trailing contestant (or the one who did not start Round 1 in case of a tie) plays first. Each team is shown two similar stories and must decide which one earned the higher Index rating, earning $1,000 for a correct guess.

=== Round 3: Master of Misery ===
One miserable story is presented to both teams, and the contestants separately and secretly lock in their guesses at its Index rating. The one whose guess is closer to the actual rating wins $2,000 and advances to the bonus round with his/her teammates. An exact guess doubles the value to $4,000. However, if the two guesses are identical or equally distant from the actual rating, another story is played as a tiebreaker with the same $2,000/$4,000 at stake.

=== Bonus Round: Margin of Misery ===
The winning contestant is shown three miserable stories, one at a time, and must guess the Index rating of each within a specified margin of error in order to win additional money as follows.

- First story: $5,000 value, within 30 points
- Second story: $10,000 value, within 20 points
- Third story: $15,000 value, within 10 points

The contestant guesses by moving a range finder on a sliding scale, attempting to cover the actual rating, and has 10 seconds to lock in a guess on each story. He/she may choose one Tenderloin teammate for assistance. Before the third story is revealed, the other three Tenderloins join the contestant onstage to provide moral support.

The maximum potential winnings total in a standard game is $35,500, obtained by guessing correctly in each of the first two rounds, winning $4,000 for an exact guess in the third, and successfully covering the actual Index rating of all three stories in the bonus round. On December 23, 2020, the final episode of season two was called a holiday special where the third story of the bonus round yielded $25,000. The contestant that reached that round, Buddy, had played a perfect game and won all three bonus round stories, resulting in a grand total of $53,500.

== Episodes ==
Season	Episodes		Originally released	
Season	Episodes		First released	Last released
1	10		October 22, 2019	December 17, 2019
2	20	10	May 14, 2020	July 16, 2020
2	20	10	October 20, 2020	December 23, 2020
3	20	10	January 26, 2021	March 23, 2021
3	20	10	March 29, 2022	

=== Season 1 (2019) ===
No. overall	No. in season	Title	Original release date
1	1	"That Milk Must Have Turned by Now"	October 22, 2019
2	2	"Men of Intellect"	October 22, 2019
3	3	"He's Crushing His Man Cave Game"	October 29, 2019
4	4	"How Did It Get in There?"	November 5, 2019
5	5	"You Better Watch Your Filthy Mouth"	November 12, 2019
6	6	"We Got That D!"	November 19, 2019
7	7	"So That's Murder Then?"	November 26, 2019
8	8	"If My Grandmother Was that Hot, I'd Go for Her Too"	December 3, 2019
9	9	"Check Out This Sucker!"	December 10, 2019
10	10	"They Made Me Do It!"	December 17, 2019

=== Season 2 (2020) ===
No. overall	No. in season	Title	Original release date
Part 1
11	1	"When We Smash"	May 14, 2020
12	2	"UK vs US Special"	May 21, 2020
13	3	"This is Not a Drill!"	May 28, 2020
14	4	"The Grandma Special"	June 4, 2020
15	5	"They Didn't Blur the Dog!"	June 11, 2020
16	6	"Send in the Clowns"	June 18, 2020
17	7	"No One Told Sal"	June 25, 2020
18	8	"I Used to Have Abs Once Too"	July 2, 2020
19	9	"Trust Me As Someone Who Has One!"	July 9, 2020
20	10	"A Brick in the Face"	July 16, 2020
Part 2
21	11	"Chicken, Spaghetti and Sex"	October 20, 2020
22	12	"He Looks Like Mr. Magoo"	October 27, 2020
23	13	"Confirmed Urine"	November 10, 2020
24	14	"A Soprano in the Family"	November 17, 2020
25	15	"It Messes With Your Head!"	November 24, 2020
26	16	"Double the Misery"	December 1, 2020
27	17	"It's Gonna Be a Bloodbath"	December 8, 2020
28	18	"I'd Say Sex With a Nun!"	December 15, 2020
29	19	"Are You Cray-Cray?"	December 22, 2020
30	20	"The $50,000 Misery Index Holiday Special"	December 23, 2020

=== Season 3 (2021–22) ===
No. overall	No. in season	Title	Original release date
Part 1
31	1	"Eat My Pants!"	January 26, 2021
32	2	"Waste of a Good Bum"	February 2, 2021
33	3	"A Truly Miserable Valentine's Special"	February 9, 2021
34	4	"Jon Moxley vs His Bulldog"	February 16, 2021
35	5	"Ye Olden Days of Misery"	February 24, 2021
36	6	"A Monkey Stole My Baby"	March 2, 2021
37	7	"Don't Dip THAT in the Salsa"	March 9, 2021
38	8	"My Stepson, My Husband....My Lover"	March 16, 2021
39	9	"Major Red Flags"	March 20, 2021
40	10	"Bridge Over Troubled Infomercial"	March 23, 2021
Part 2
41	11	"Florida! Florida! Florida!"	March 29, 2022
42	12	"Joel McHale Explodes"	March 29, 2022
43	13	"Camels Gone Wild"	March 29, 2022
44	14	"Sexy Cougars"	March 29, 2022
45	15	"Is That a Third Arm?!"	March 29, 2022
46	16	"Feel the Burn"	March 29, 2022
47	17	"Beast Murr"	March 29, 2022
48	18	"She Licks What???"	March 29, 2022
49	19	"Gambled on a Fart"	March 29, 2022
50	20	"That's Not Snowflake!"	March 29, 2022

== French-Canadian version ==
In 2023, a Quebec version under the name Plus ou moins misérable(More or Less Miserable) hosted by Eve Côté with Marie-Lyne and Korine Côté as panelists airs on Noovo. It premiered on September 10, 2023.

== See also ==
- Misery index (economics)
