= Monk (soundtrack) =

Monk (original television soundtrack)

Soundtrack album by Jeff Beal
- Released: July 27, 2004 (U.S.)
- Recorded: Many Rooms Music, California
- Genres: Instrumental, Industrial, Classical, Film soundtrack
- Length: 53:25
- Label: Varèse Sarabande
- Producers: Jeff Beal; Robert Townson

In 2004, following the popular success and numerous awards and nominations for the cable television series Monk, Varèse Sarabande released an official soundtrack on compact disc.

Containing original music composed and conducted by Jeff Beal, the 36-track album contains tracks from various first-season episodes, a special extended arrangement of the original theme, and one composition written and recorded, but ultimately not contained in an episode. The disc plays for 53:25.

== Track listing ==
No.	Title	Length
1.	"Monk Theme (extended version)"	02:34
2.	"Miming Mr. Monk"	01:34
3.	"They're Killing Dr. Gould"	01:03
4.	"A Clean Apartment"	01:16
5.	"Finding The Pebble"	00:58
6.	"Rejection"	00:40
7.	"Trudy's Theme"	02:18
8.	"I Think I Smell Gas"	01:49
9.	"Keys In The Casket"	02:15
10.	"Lucky Guy"	01:30
11.	"Fat Suit Folly"	01:43
12.	"Monk Visits The Garage"	02:46
13.	"Counting Meters"	01:12
14.	"Monk Interrogates Gavin"	01:13
15.	"Remember Me?"	03:05
16.	"There Was A Struggle"	01:43
17.	"Monk Theme#"	00:51
18.	"Have Fun"	01:05
19.	"Pebbles And Clues"	01:05
20.	"Sharpening Pencils"	00:48
21.	"Zen Monk"	00:47
22.	"Monk's A Hero"	00:56
23.	"Love These Sneaks"	02:03
24.	"My Hero"	00:56
25.	"On The Beach"	00:53
26.	"The Final Chase"	03:49
27.	"Start The Watch"	01:00
28.	"Losing It?"	00:33
29.	"Monk Escapes"	02:32
30.	"Worried Monk"	01:09
31.	"Restaging The Murder"	01:48
32.	"Running Away"	00:54
33.	"Finding, Looking"	01:07
34.	"Back Safe At Home"	01:03
35.	"The Kiss"	01:08
36.	"Monk Theme (pilot version)"	01:19

== Credits ==
- Composer: Jeff Beal
- Producer: Jeff Beal
- Executive Producer: Robert Townson
- Music Editors: Helena Lea (pilot) and Jeff Wolpert (series, season one)
- Master: Erick Labson
- "Monk Theme" performed by Grant Geissman (guitar) and Jeff Beal.
- Recorded and Mixed by Jeff Beal at Many Rooms Music, California.
- Special Thanks: Dean Parisot, Rob Thompson, Jackie de Crinis, Todd Sharp, Judith Marlan, Fern Field, Nancy Mullins, Helena Lea, Robert Messinger, Andy Breckman, David Hoberman and Tony Shalhoub.
- Score published by USA Network, LLC/BMI.
