= Jameela Jamil =

British actress and comedian (born 1986)

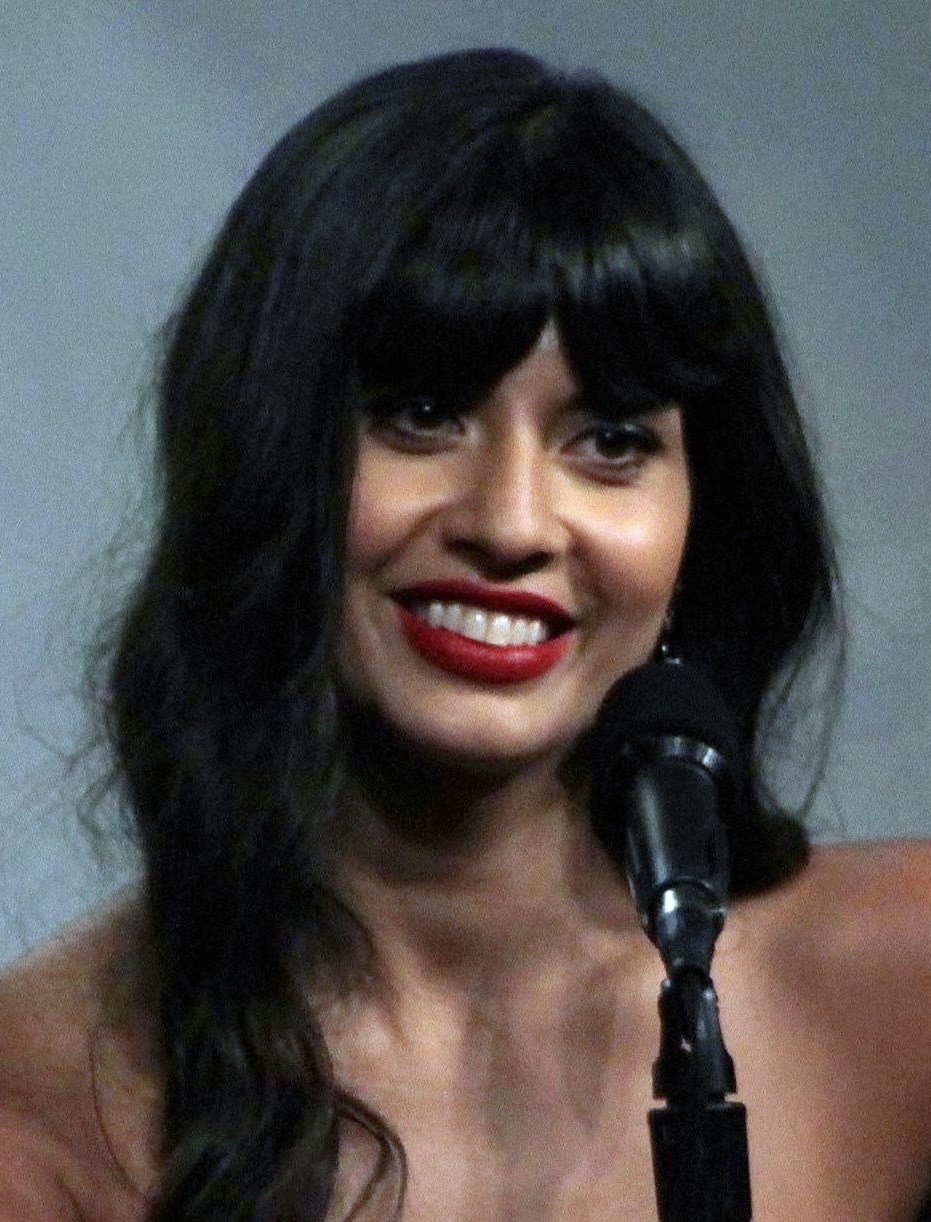
- Jamil in 2018
- Born: Jameela Alia Jamil; 25 February 1986 (age 40); London, England
- Occupations: Actress; comedian; television personality and presenter; model; writer; activist
- Years active: 2009–present
- Partner: James Blake (2015–present)

Jameela Alia Jamil (born 25 February 1986) is a British actress, comedian, activist, and presenter. She began her career on Channel 4, where she hosted a pop culture series in the T4 strand from 2009 until 2012. She then became the radio host of The Official Chart and co-hosted The Official Chart Update alongside Scott Mills on BBC Radio 1. She was the first regular solo female presenter of the BBC Radio 1 chart show.

In 2016, Jamil moved to the United States. She played Tahani Al-Jamil in the NBC fantasy comedy series The Good Place. She also hosted the TBS late-night game show The Misery Index and was one of the judges of the voguing reality competition show Legendary. In 2022, Jamil worked on two superhero projects: the animated film DC League of Super-Pets and the live-action television series She-Hulk: Attorney at Law. Since 2022, she has voiced the character Asencia in the science fiction series Star Trek: Prodigy.

== Early life ==
Jameela Alia Jamil was born on 25 February 1986 to Ali and Shireen Jamil, in London, England. She is of Pakistani descent on her mother's side and Indian descent on her father's side. Jamil grew up in several areas; she moved from Dulwich to Croydon before spending time in Spain and Pakistan, where each of her grandmothers lived. Upon returning to England, she lived in Camden, Belsize Park, Swiss Cottage, and Hampstead, the latter as a teenager in a council flat.

As a child, she faced numerous health problems, being born with congenital hearing loss and labyrinthitis, which she has had several operations to correct, and that she had 70% hearing ability in her left ear and 50% in her right ear. At nine, she was diagnosed with hypermobile Ehlers–Danlos syndrome, a genetic disorder affecting the connective tissue in the body, and at 12 with coeliac disease. She experienced mercury poisoning at 21, which she attributes to mercury leakage from amalgam teeth fillings, exacerbated by their improper removal, which damaged her digestive system.

As a teenager she suffered from anorexia nervosa, and describes not eating a full meal between the ages of 14 and 17. She believes her eating disorder developed due to social pressure, including magazine articles selling weight loss products. At age 17, she was struck by a car while running from a bee, breaking several bones and damaging her spine. She describes being told that she might never walk again, but slowly recovering after steroid treatment and physiotherapy, using a Zimmer frame to start walking. She credits the car accident for pushing her toward recovery from anorexia, saying it changed her relationship with her body. She attended Queen's College School in London but was unable to complete her A-Levels, citing the accident.

She then taught English to foreign students at the Callan School of English in London for two years. In a 2013 interview with The Independent, she said she worked as a model scout. She also describes having worked as a photographer, scout and model agent for Premier Model Management.

== Career ==
=== 2009–2015: Early media career ===
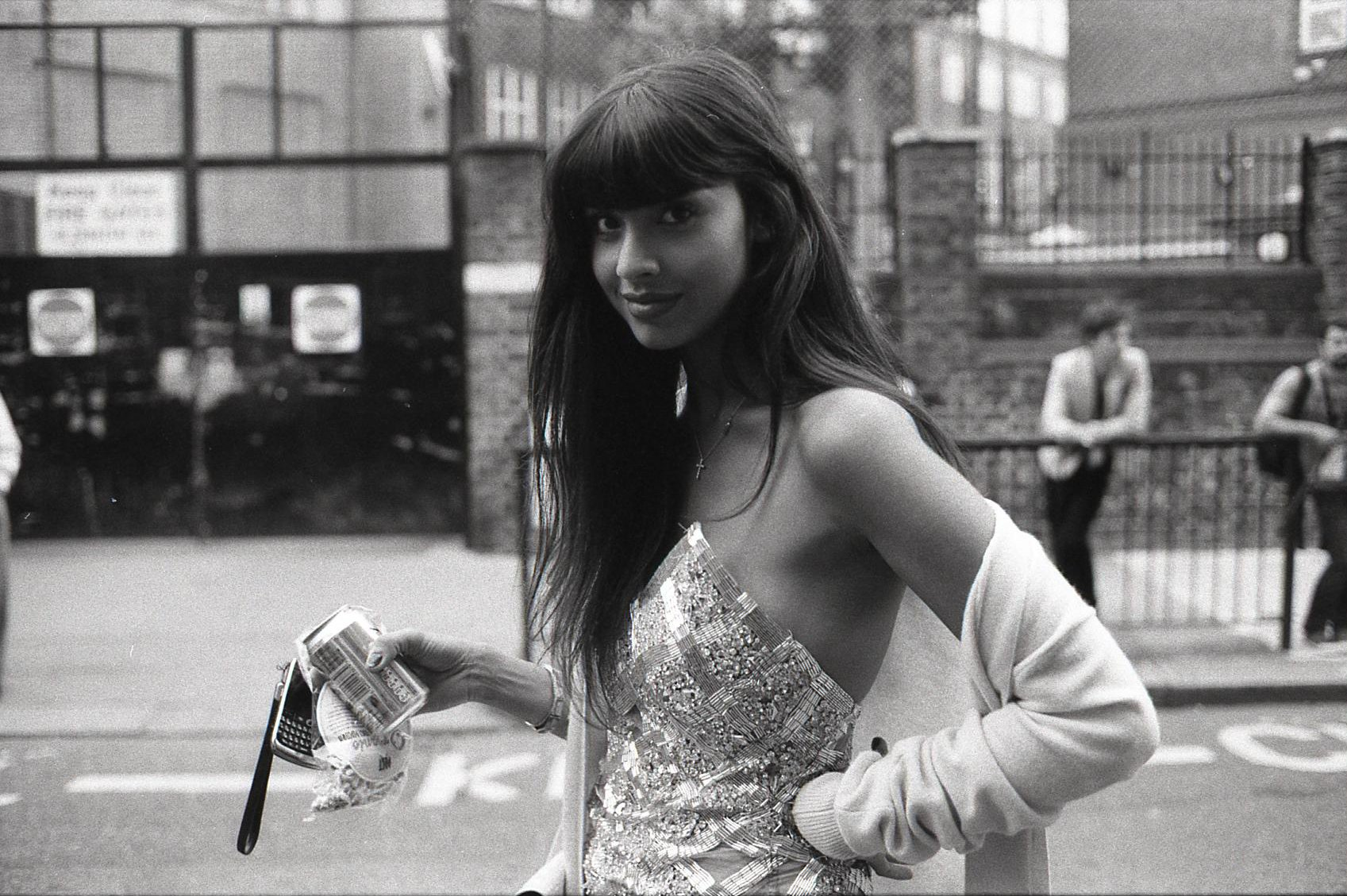
Jamil, pictured at the London Fashion Week, 2009

Jamil said in an NPR interview that she was working as a teacher when she was discovered by a producer at a bar and asked to audition as a presenter. She also said she applied to be a presenter by email after seeing a T4 (youth slot of British free-to-air Channel 4) job advertisement. Jamil appeared on Music Zone on E4, the digital / free-to-view entertainment channel owned by Channel Four, toward the end of 2008. She then began presenting at Channel 4's youth slot T4 in 2009. In January 2009, when the previous presenter, Alexa Chung, left the morning TV show Freshly Squeezed, Jamil succeeded her as co-host, alongside Nick Grimshaw. In 2010, Jamil presented The Closet, an online fashion advice show on the social networking site Bebo produced by Twenty Twenty.

It's very exciting. I know it shouldn't be a big deal, but there's also a huge lack of ethnic minorities in showbiz. I'm completely Asian – not mix – and I'm so proud to be such a big part of Radio 1. I actually can't wait to get started now!

— Jamil, on being the first female host of The Official Chart on BBC Radio 1.

Jamil also started working as an event DJ in 2010. She has said that her first show was at Elton John's birthday party, where she says she was invited to DJ because she lied about having prior experience. In subsequent interviews and social media, she said she worked as a DJ for eight years, after studying music for six years on a music scholarship.

From 2011 to 2014, she wrote a column for the women's monthly magazine Company. In January 2012, Jamil replaced June Sarpong as host of the reality show Playing It Straight, in which a group of gay men lie about their sexuality and compete with a group of straight men for a woman's affections to win money. In June 2012, Jamil collaborated with Very to debut her first fashion collection. At the end of 2012, she became the radio host of The Official Chart and co-host of The Official Chart Update alongside Scott Mills on BBC Radio 1. Jamil made radio history, becoming the first sole female presenter of the BBC Radio 1 Chart show.

=== 2016–present: Transition into acting ===
Jamil left London in 2016 and moved to Los Angeles, with no plans to act, and instead intended to work as a screenwriter. While working as a writer at 3 Arts, her agents told her that Michael Schur, who co-created Parks and Recreation, was looking for a British actress for an upcoming comedy series. Having no acting experience at this point, she went for the audition and told the casting director that she had stage acting experience. She was later recalled for a second interview with Schur and the producers, in which she claimed to have comedy improv experience. She was eventually given the role.

In September 2016, the NBC fantasy comedy series The Good Place premiered, with Jamil as a regular cast member, playing Tahani Al-Jamil. Jamil's character became known for her tendency to name drop.

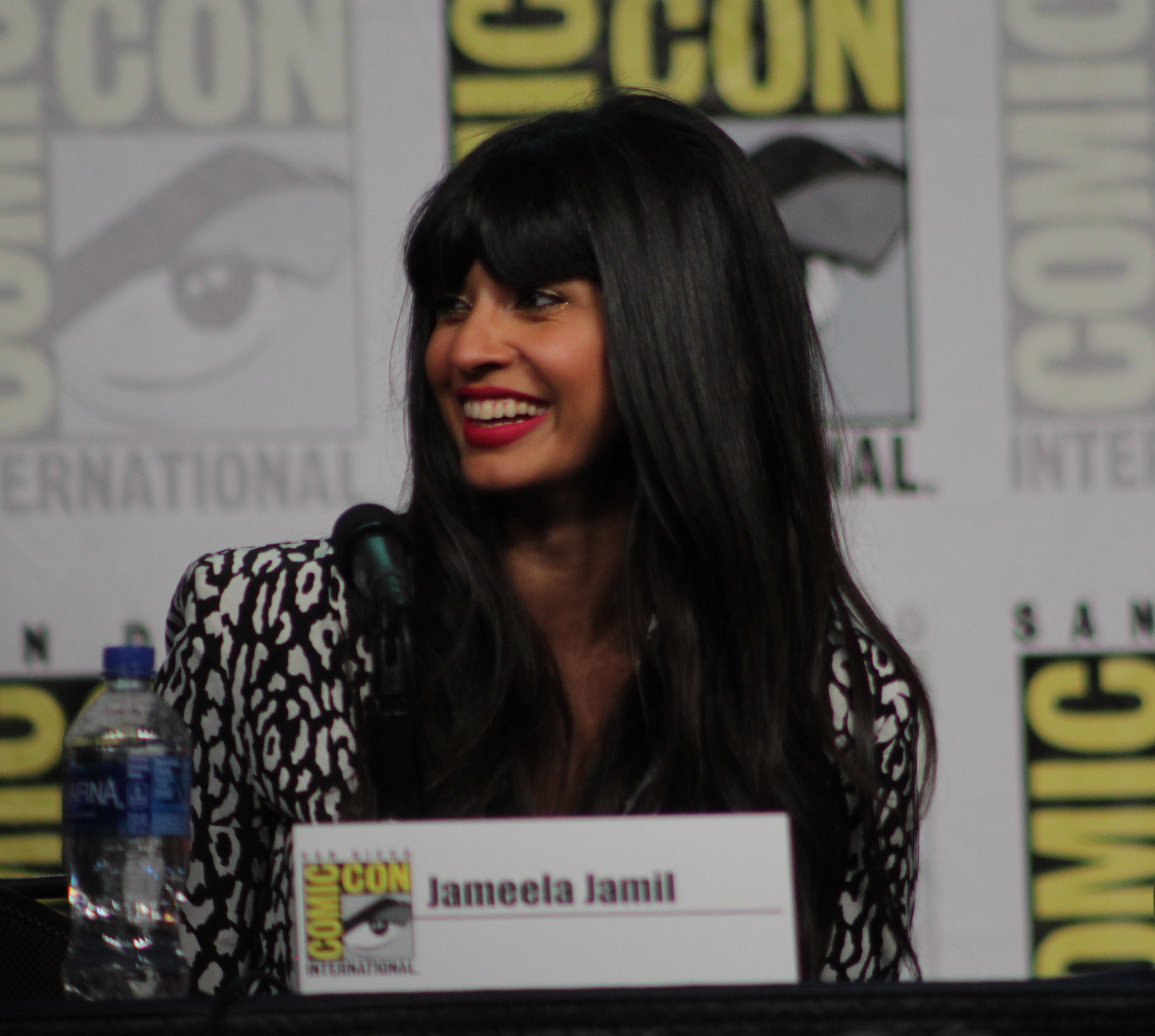
Jamil at San Diego Comic-Con on 20 July 2019

Jamil was on the cover of The Cut in February 2018; it was her first appearance on the cover of an American magazine. She provided her voice as a guest on the animated television series DuckTales. In the same year, Jamil hosted a recurring segment on Last Call with Carson Daly during its final season, "Wide Awake with Jameela Jamil".

Jamil's boyfriend, musician James Blake, said that she contributed to the production of his fourth album, Assume Form, in 2017–18; she is credited as an additional producer on five songs on the album.

Since 2019, Jamil has been the host of The Misery Index, a comedy game show on TBS.

In 2018, Jamil joined the cast of Disney's Indian-inspired cartoon set in fictional Jalpur. Mira, Royal Detective debuted in March 2020, with Jamil playing Mira's Auntie Pushpa.

In March 2020, she posed in a suit and tie for Playboy magazine's "On Speech" issue. She later tweeted, "From my Playboy shoot, I wanted to be shot like a man. No retouching, hi res, loose, comfortable clothes and completely unsexualized. I felt extremely free."

In April 2020, she debuted her podcast I Weigh with Jameela Jamil, which focuses on women's accomplishments, body positivity, activism and racial inclusivity. In October 2020, the podcast was nominated for an E! People's Choice Award. She was also the host of the first season of the SmartLess podcast Bad Dates.

In June 2021, Jamil was cast as the supervillain Mary MacPherran / Titania in the Disney+ streaming series She-Hulk: Attorney at Law (2022), set in the Marvel Cinematic Universe. Also in 2022, she voiced Wonder Woman in the animated film DC League of Super-Pets.

In 2021, Jamil contributed to the production of Blake's fifth album, Friends That Break Your Heart, adding additional production to its first single, "Say What You Will".

== Activism ==
In 2015, Jamil launched Why Not People?, an events and membership company dedicated to hosting live entertainment events accessible to people with disabilities.

In August 2020, Jamil announced on Twitter that she was deleting tweets from 2009 to 2020 in order to make her account more activism-focused. In November 2020, Jamil said it was a third-party app that caused her Twitter posts to disappear in the previous months, and that she had deleted her entire Twitter post history to figure out why her posts were being removed.

Jamil supports climate change awareness, expressing her admiration for Jane Fonda, Greta Thunberg and several other climate change activists.

In July 2026, while talking about her role as Tahani Al-Jamil in the television series The Good Place, Jamil called British people "the most evil people in history," “horrible", "awful,” compared them to the Marvel supervillain Thanos, and highlighted British rule in India for plundering "43 trillion pounds from the subcontinent." Jamil faced heavy backlash for her remarks.

=== Body image and health ===
Jamil has been a promoter of body neutrality. She criticises media industry standards and labels other female celebrities "double agents of the patriarchy" by promoting an unhealthy body image.

Jamil is against the airbrushing of editorial images and refuses to retouch all her photo shoots.

I think it's a disgusting crime to Photoshop your images and put them out there in the world without announcing that's what you've done. It's a lie, you're lying to your fans, and your followers, and people who look up to you. You're an asshole. I really believe that. You're an asshole.

— Jameela Jamil, excerpt from the 2018 Nylon cover interview

Jamil is critical of fashion and modeling industry standards and remarked that runway models looked "long-starved" and "terrified". Jamil frequently references Victoria's Secret models as a counterexample to her own identity. She also called Chanel designer Karl Lagerfeld a "ruthless, fat-phobic misogynist" after his death.

In March 2018, Jamil created an Instagram account called I Weigh, inspired by a picture that she came across online of Kourtney, Kim and Khloé Kardashian with their half-sisters Kendall and Kylie Jenner, detailing each woman's weight. Jamil describes I Weigh as "a movement... for us to feel valuable and see how amazing we are, and look past the flesh on our bones". The account welcomes submissions of followers' non-edited or airbrushed selfies using the hashtag #iweigh, with text describing the things that they feel grateful for or proud of. In part due to this work, Jamil was listed as one of BBC's 100 Women during 2018.

Jamil is a critic of diet shakes and appetite suppressants. She often invokes her own experience of having an eating disorder in her teens, having explained that she starved herself, took laxatives and followed tips from celebrities on how to maintain a low weight.

She has criticised the Kardashians, rapper Cardi B, and other influencers for promoting diet products. Jamil created a petition on change.org titled "Stop celebrities promoting toxic diet products on social media", with a goal of reaching 150,000 signatures. She called upon social media networks such as Facebook, Twitter, and Instagram to ban the practice, noting its dangerous effects on teenagers. In September 2019, Instagram rolled out new global policy restrictions to help protect teen users.

There's little to no information about the side effects or main ingredients, the harm they may cause or any of the science behind how these products are supposed to work. They are instead, flogged in glossy paid adverts by celebrities and influencers with no expertise or authority in nutrition/medicine/biology.

— An excerpt from Jamil's diet petition

In 2019, Jamil called out rapper Cupcakke on Twitter for posting about doing a water fast. Jamil often criticises Kim Kardashian for promoting unhealthy body ideals, such as by wearing a corset, promoting body makeup to cover skin imperfections such as psoriasis and offering maternity shapewear for her fashion line.

=== Sexuality ===
In 2013, Jamil criticised Rihanna in her column for Company magazine, blaming her for maintaining a relationship with her abuser for fame, smoking marijuana, and posting "provocative images on Instagram to millions of hungry followers". In 2014, she voiced her disapproval of Beyoncé sexualising her public image like Nicki Minaj, Rihanna, Miley Cyrus, Iggy Azalea and criticised all these artists for "delud[ing] themselves into thinking it's 'feminism' if you get your fanny out on 'your terms'."

In February 2020, she encountered criticism for taking a role as a host of the HBO voguing contest show Legendary, as she was not perceived as queer. She came out as queer in response.

In 2023, Jamil signed an open letter expressing "serious concerns about editorial bias" in The New York Times's reporting on transgender people. The letter characterized the newspaper's reporting as using "an eerily familiar mix of pseudoscience and euphemistic, charged language", and raised concerns about the Times's employment practices for trans contributors.

Jamil sent her publicist a series of text messages that were critical of Blake Lively at the start of and during a heavily publicized dispute between Lively and Justin Baldoni. After the texts became public, Jamil was criticized for siding with a man accused of sexual harassment and insulting an alleged victim although she presented as a feminist. Jamil responded in an Instagram story, saying: “Guys, feminism means fighting for the political, social and economic equity of women, for women. Just gender equity. It does not mean you have to like every single woman. It doesn’t mean you have to be friends with every single woman.”

=== Charity ===
Jamil appeared on C4 Orange Rockcorps 2009, volunteering to help create a concert to fund local community projects. She has supported the Cultural Learning Alliance, which promotes access to culture for children and young people, and Vinspired National Awards for people aged 16–25 who have contributed to their communities through volunteering. Jamil designed her own version of SpongeBob SquarePants to be auctioned off with all the proceeds going to Childline. She also said she would wear a chicken costume for the number of days equal to the number of thousands of pounds she raises for Comic Relief. She was sponsored approximately £16,000 and wore the costume for 16 consecutive days.

== Honours ==
Jamil was one of 15 women selected to appear on the cover of the September 2019 issue of British Vogue "Forces for Change", by guest editor Meghan, Duchess of Sussex.

On 2 August 2019, Jamil was awarded "Advocate of the Year" from the Ehlers–Danlos Society.

Jamil received the "Phenom" award from the 12th annual Shorty Awards on 3 May 2020.

== Personal life ==
Jamil has been in a relationship with musician James Blake since 2015. She publicly declared herself as queer after her appointment as a judge of voguing reality series Legendary received heavy criticism, as voguing ball culture is rooted in Black and Latino LGBTQ communities in New York.

Jamil has experienced anxiety, depression, and obsessive–compulsive disorder. On 10 October 2019, as part of World Mental Health Day, Jamil said she survived a suicide attempt six years earlier. In a 2020 episode of the talkshow Red Table Talk, she said she had also attempted suicide eight years earlier due to a major depressive episode. She said that she had EMDR therapy to treat her post-traumatic stress disorder before moving to Los Angeles.

In May 2024, Jamil said that her battle with an eating disorder had destroyed her bone density and damaged "my kidney, my liver, my digestive system, my heart".

== Filmography ==
=== Film ===
Key
†	Denotes films that have not yet been released

Film appearances by Jameela Jamil
Year	Title	Role	Notes
2019	How to Build a Girl	Cleopatra	
2022	Marry Me	Anikah	
2022	DC League of Super-Pets	Wonder Woman (voice)	
2023	Love at First Sight	Narrator	
2025	Elio	Ambassador Questa (voice)	
2025	A Merry Little Ex-Mas	Tess Wiley	
2026	People We Meet on Vacation	Swapna Bakshi-Highsmith	
2026	Paw Patrol: The Dino Movie	Heidi Pothesis (voice)	

=== Television ===
Television appearances by Jameela Jamil
Year	Title	Role	Notes
2009–2012	Freshly Squeezed	Herself	Lead host
2009–2012	T4	Herself	Host
2012	Playing It Straight	Herself	Host
2014	Celebrity Juice	Herself	Series 11, episode 8
2015	The Great Comic Relief Bake Off	Herself	Series 2, episode 3
2016–2020	The Good Place	Tahani Al-Jamil	Main cast
2018	Hollywood Game Night	Herself	Episode: "Ho Ho Holiday Game Night"
2018	Last Call with Carson Daly	Herself	Host, recurring segment, Wide Awake with Jameela Jamil
2019–2021	DuckTales	Gandra Dee, W.A.N.D.A	Voice role; 4 episodes
2019–2021	The Misery Index		Lead host
2019	Robot Chicken	Buttercup	Voice role; Episode: "Musya Shakhtyorov in: Honeyboogers"
2019	Still Laugh-In: The Stars Celebrate	Herself	
2020–2022	Legendary	Herself	Judge
2020–2022	Jurassic World Camp Cretaceous	Roxie	Voice role; Recurring role
2020	American Dad!	Christine S.	Voice role; Episode: "Exquisite Corpses"
2020	Big City Greens	Phoenix	Voice role; 2 episodes
2020	Crossing Swords	Sloane	Voice role; 4 episodes
2020	Harley Quinn	Eris	Voice role; Episode: "Bachelorette"
2020	Mira, Royal Detective	Auntie Pushpa	Voice role; Recurring role
2020	Animaniacs	Sultana	Voice role; Episode: "Episode 12: A Zit!/1001 Narfs/Manny Manspreader"
2021	Rugrats	Lady De-Clutter	Voice role; Episode: "Lady De-Clutter"
2021–2024	Star Trek: Prodigy	Asencia / The Vindicator	Voice role; Recurring role (season 1); Main role (season 2)
2022	She-Hulk: Attorney at Law	Mary MacPherran / Titania	Main role
2022	Pitch Perfect: Bumper in Berlin	Gisela	Main role
2023	Poker Face	Ava	Episode: Exit Stage Death

=== Radio ===
Radio appearances by Jameela Jamil
Year	Title	Role	Station
2012	The Radio 1 Request Show; ep. "With Jameela Jamil"	Host	BBC Radio 1
2013–2015	The Official Chart	Host	BBC Radio 1
2020	Wait Wait... Don't Tell Me!	Guest	NPR

Media offices
Preceded by Reggie Yates	BBC Radio 1 Chart show presenter 13 January 2013 – 18 January 2015	Succeeded by Clara Amfo
