= The Good Cop (Israeli TV series) =

Israeli television series

- השוטר הטוב
- Genre: Comedy
- Created by: Erez Aviram and Tomer Aviram
- Written by: Erez Aviram (Head Writer); Tomer Aviram; Assaf Beiser (Season 1); Youval Fridman (Season 1)
- Directed by: Tomer Aviram
- Country of origin: Israel
- Original language: Hebrew
- No. of seasons: 3
- No. of episodes: 30

Production
- Executive producer: Yoav Gross
- Running time: 30 min
- Production company: Yoav Gross Production

Original release
- Network: Yes Comedy
- Release: August 15, 2015 – December 7, 2017

Related
- The Good Cop (American TV series)

The Good Cop (Hebrew: השוטר הטוב, Ha-Shoter Ha-Tov) is an Israeli police television sitcom that premiered on yes. The series was created by Erez Aviram and Tomer Aviram and produced by Yoav Gross, and is the first Israeli police sitcom. The 15-part series premiered its first episode on the Yes Comedy channel in Israel on August 15, 2015. The second season of the series was broadcast on April 4, 2017 and ended on July 12, 2017. It was announced that the third season was approved.

Netflix acquired the Israeli series and in September 2018 gave a 10-episode, straight-to-series order for a U.S. remake by Andy Breckman, starring Tony Danza and Josh Groban.

== Premise ==
After years of living together, police officer Danny Confino comes home to discover his girlfriend is cheating on him. Shocked by the discovery, Danny decides to leave her and her young son, whom he loves and raises as his own. As a police salary won't allow him to rent his own apartment, Danny returns to his parents' house – temporarily. What starts out as a provisional arrangement soon becomes permanent as Danny discovers that life back at home surpasses any crime scene. Despite his unconventional and sometimes violent behavior, Danny is perceived as a "a man's man", a popular cop at the precinct he unofficially runs, but at home, with his exasperating parents and criminal brothers, he faces many more serious challenges. His hands tied, his authority limited, he slowly comes to find that his greedy and petty family are the real "criminals" and the main obstacles in his life.

== Episodes ==
=== Summary ===
Season	Episodes	Originally released	
Season	Episodes	First released	Last released
1	15	August 15, 2015	November 21, 2015
2	15	April 4, 2017	December 7, 2017

=== Season 1 ===
No.	Episode	Directed by	Written by	Original release date
1	Episode 1	Tomer Aviram	Erez Aviram	15 August 2015
A clever comedy about an honest and by-the-book cop named Danny with anger management problems, surrounded by people with questionable morals. After finding out his girlfriend is cheating on him he leaves her and moves back in with his dysfunctional family.
2	Episode 2	Tomer Aviram	Erez Aviram	22 August 2015
Izhar is preparing for the Social Security medical committee. The precinct commander runs a bet on who will find out the true reason behind Danny's breakup. Dubi and Danny are tricked by a gang of sophisticated bike thieves.
3	Episode 3	Tomer Aviram	Erez Aviram	29 August 2015
Following his recent violent behavior, Danny is sent to see the department psychologist. Izhar's old armchair is the center of a squabble between him and Yona, who threatens to divorce him. Danny is eager to make things right between them, but his plan has dramatic consequences.
4	Episode 4	Tomer Aviram	Erez Aviram	5 September 2015
Danny is getting involved with an attractive tourist. The air conditioner has broken down, and Yona gets upset as Izhar is reluctant to call the technician. A group of Breslov followers shuts down the city, causing problems between Rabi and Danny.
5	Episode 5	Tomer Aviram	Erez Aviram	12 September 2015
Izhar and Eitan convince Danny to invest a large sum of money with a shady financial consultant. When the other cops hear about the deal, they all want a piece of the action. Roncho gets beaten up at school, and Danny decides it's time to teach him to stand up for himself.
6	Episode 6	Tomer Aviram	Erez Aviram	19 September 2015
Danny starts dating Shuli, a beautiful art student, but their idyllic relationship is disturbed when a female police officer is aggressively trying to seduce him. Yona and Izhar continue to quarrel, and Yona decides she wants a dog as a gesture of reconciliation.
7	Episode 7	Tomer Aviram	Erez Aviram	26 September 2015
Danny is concerned that he was sexually harassed while being treated by the chiropractor. Yona disappears at night and Izhar suspects that she is cheating on him. Rabi's ambitious operation isn't going well, but then Razi brings on a game-changer.
8	Episode 8	Tomer Aviram	Erez Aviram	3 October 2015
Danny realizes that Izhar was never there for him as a father, and they decide to spend more time together. After a big-time criminal gets injured during his arrest, the cops must take shifts to watch him while he's in the hospital, just as Dubi disappears.
9	Episode 9	Tomer Aviram	Erez Aviram	10 October 2015
The operation to capture egg smugglers fails miserably, and Rabi puts the blame on Dubi. Danny discovers disturbing signs of Shuli's imbalance, but he's not yet ready to give the relationship up.
10	Episode 10	Tomer Aviram	Erez Aviram	17 October 2015
Eitan and Dany throw a party for their parents' anniversary in Netanya, but something goes wrong when a disturbing detail from Yona's past is revealed. And just then, Dubi and Corin arrive, each with their own drama.
11	Episode 11	Tomer Aviram	Erez Aviram	24 October 2015
Yona runs for HOA president and Izhar is trying to benefit from the situation. Razi loses consciousness during a chase. The relationship between Danny and Corin moves forward.
12	Episode 12	Tomer Aviram	Erez Aviram	31 October 2015
Danny falls victim to cyberbullying. Meyron, Danny's older brother, comes on a surprise visit with a new business venture. Izhar falls in love with a French tourist and leaves home.
13	Episode 13	Tomer Aviram	Erez Aviram	7 November 2015
Danny and his brothers try to convince Izhar to come back home. The real reason for Meyron's visit is revealed and it threatens to break up the family. The future of the precinct is in jeopardy after an inspection of a senior supervisor.
14	Episode 14	Tomer Aviram	Erez Aviram	14 November 2015
Rabi Informs the officers of the new pairings and Dubi has to make a tough decision. Izhar and Yona are trying to give their relationship another chance, but it's not going well. Danny is caught in a hostage situation during a bank robbery.
15	Episode 15	Tomer Aviram	Erez Aviram	21 November 2015
Rabi and the officers arrive at the scene of the crime. While trapped inside the bank, Danny is trying to take control. As the SWAT team arrives, they get into a pissing contest with the cops. And for some reason, Izhar and Yona also decide to show up.

=== Season 2 ===
No.	Episode	Directed by	Written by	Original release date
1	Episode 1	Tomer Aviram	Erez Aviram	4 April 2017
The comedy series starring Yuval Semo and Liora Rivlin is back for 2nd season. The precinct commander is trying to garner some achievements, and Dani Konfino tries his luck on the romantic side of life.
2	Episode 2	Tomer Aviram	Erez Aviram	11 April 2017
The connection with Yizhar is disengaged and it seems that something is wrong, Danny is experiencing a youth trauma all over again. The precinct is thriving thanks to a dramatic increase in the number of reports.
3	Episode 3	Tomer Aviram	Erez Aviram	18 April 2017
Bad news comes to the Konfinos. E.T takes advantage of the situation to evade reserve duty. At the precinct, Rabi gives feedback forms to assess his performance.
4	Episode 4	Tomer Aviram	Erez Aviram	25 April 2017
Isaac moves in with the parents, and Danny gets upset. Poor Dubi falls victim to Rabbi's manipulations, and Dalit pushes Danny to give her an answer.
5	Episode 5	Tomer Aviram	Erez Aviram	3 May 2017
A police car that vanishes poses a problem for Danny, who follows the thieves. The tension and the emotional upheaval take a heavy emotional toll on Yona. Dalit and Danny want a baby, and start trying.
6	Episode 6	Tomer Aviram	Erez Aviram	10 May 2017
In order to improve the police image, Rabi sets up a library at the precinct and demands that everyone start reading. A romantic affair from the past is bothering Danny just as Korin tries to get closer to him.
7	Episode 7	Tomer Aviram	Erez Aviram	17 May 2017
Danny and Dalit continue their attempts to get pregnant. E.T. gets involved in a dubious deal. A Ukrainian officer visits the precinct and reveals secrets about Rabi.
8	Episode 8	Tomer Aviram	Erez Aviram	24 May 2017
The police are getting nervous about the annual police quiz, and Rabi has to decide who is going to represent the precinct. Yona meets a young man and Danny is sent for tests at a fertility clinic.
9	Episode 9	Tomer Aviram	Erez Aviram	31 May 2017
A warning of a suicide bombing kicks off an emergency procedure at the precinct, and things gets out of control.
10	Episode 10	Tomer Aviram	Erez Aviram	7 June 2017
Danny arrives at the weekly psychology session with Reuven, which turns into an unexpected event after Danny makes a dramatic announcement.
11	Episode 11	Tomer Aviram	Erez Aviram	14 June 2017
A new officer who joins the team causes nervousness and tension at the precinct. The relationship between Danny and Corinne is heating up, and Yona and Udi are caught in an intimate situation.
12	Episode 12	Tomer Aviram	Erez Aviram	21 June 2017
Dubi and Yochi's love life is in crisis, and it's Danny who pays the price. Yona makes a romantic decision and the attempt to use Yizhar's old car exacts a painful price.
13	Episode 13	Tomer Aviram	Erez Aviram	28 June 2017
Danny and Korin go on vacation to clear their heads, but peace is destroyed when they find out who their neighbors are.
14	Episode 14	Tomer Aviram	Erez Aviram	5 July 2017
The officers are busy organizing the farewell party for Rabi while he is on an important date. Danny reveals disturbing details about Udi, and Dubi has a new love.
15	Episode 15	Tomer Aviram	Erez Aviram	12 July 2017
Season finale. Danny is in the hospital in a difficult situation, when his friends and family gather and prepare for the worst. Rabi gets surprising news.

== Cast and characters ==
=== Main ===
- First Sergeant Danny Konfino (Yuval Semo): After discovering that his girlfriend is cheating on him, Danny, a cranky 40-year-old police officer, decides to move back in with his parents. In the second season, Danny is faced with a romantic dilemma.
- Yona Konfino (Liora Rivlin): Danny's kindhearted mother. She has had enough of Izhar, Danny's cheap father, and their constant quarreling.
- Commander Jacob 'Rabi' (Guy Loel): The commander of the Petach Tikva police precinct for the last ten years, is a little selfish and known for his tendency to pamper himself with a variety of body lotions.
- Sergeant Dubi Azaria (Yigal Adika): Danny's friend, and a veteran cop who is lazy and fat. Robbed a bank at the end of the season because he needed money to raise his new baby. He was almost taken into custody but saved by Danny.
- Razi (Loai Nofi): An Israeli-Arab police officer.
- Izhar (Moshe Ivgy): Danny's father.
- Korin (Ortal Ben-Shoshan).
- Reuven, Danny's psychologist (Gilad Kleter).
