= Seven Second Delay =

Seven Second Delay is a comedy radio show broadcast on radio station WFMU. It has been hosted by Ken Freedman and Andy Breckman since the early 1990s. The show is self described as "on air radio stunts."

In March 2022, as part of a radio station fundraiser, the show's name officially changed to Dinner at Andy's for the next year. This followed a similar stunt in March 2021, in which the show's name officially changed to Andy and Ken's Fuzzy Glove Hour for one year. In 2026, the show was re-christened Well-Dressed Fancy Dandies with Ken and Andy, a title intended to last for one year.

In February 2007, the show received wide attention for a program in which an entry to the Metropolitan Diary section of The New York Times was faked. The faked entry was submitted to the Times by the program's blogmaster, who then lied to the editor who called to fact-check. After the false story ran in the Times, many blogs mocked the paper for it, and the Times editor called the blogmaster to berate her and threaten her future academic and career prospects. Freedman and Breckman called the editor on the air the next week to apologize (and to correct the error by causing an incident in real life that mirrored the one they had earlier fabricated). Subsequently, the story circulated that the Times might, as a result of this incident, cancel the Metropolitan Diary altogether.
