= Ken Freedman =

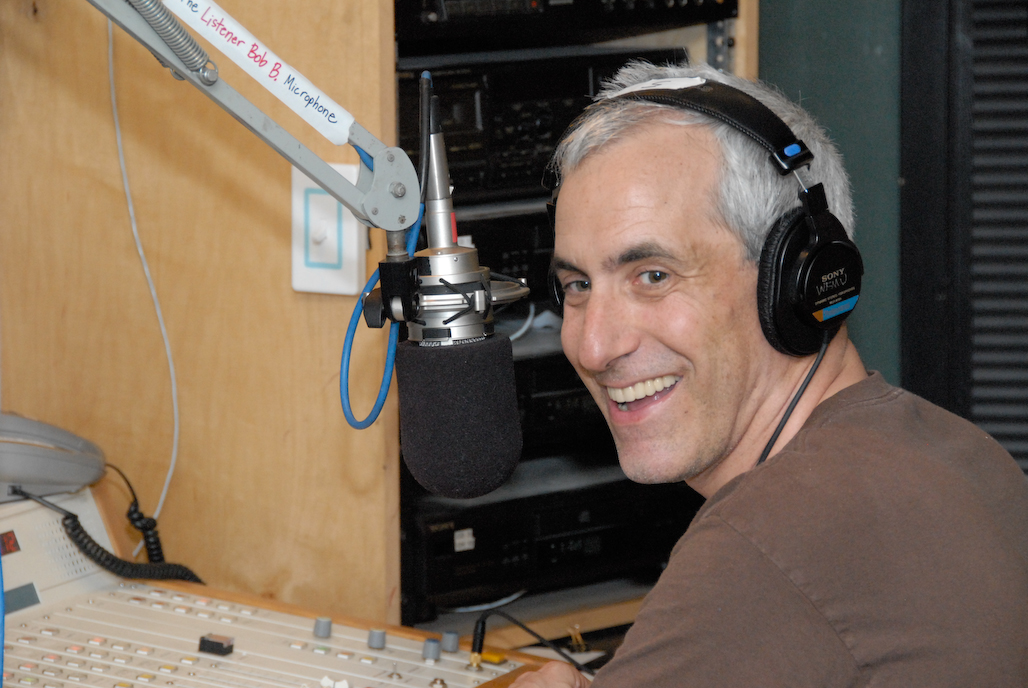
- Freedman in 2008
- Born: February 18, 1959 (age 67)
- Education: University of Michigan
- Occupation: General manager of WFMU
- Years active: 1976—present
- Known for: Seven Second Delay

Ken Freedman (born February 18, 1959) is an American radio personality. The general manager of WFMU, a freeform and independent radio station based in New Jersey, he co-hosts the comedy program Seven Second Delay with Andy Breckman, as well as hosting his own freeform radio program. He is a resident of Weehawken, New Jersey.

== History ==
In 1976 he hosted his first radio program as a DJ at Highland Park High School station WVHP. He served as station manager of WCBN-FM, the University of Michigan at Ann Arbor's freeform outlet, where he marked the 1980 election of Ronald Reagan by playing Lesley Gore's "It's My Party" for eighteen consecutive hours.

In December 1983, he joined WFMU as a DJ and succeeded Bruce Longstreet as general manager in August 1985. At the time, WFMU was licensed to and owned by Upsala College, and based in East Orange, New Jersey.

In February 1986, he launched a program guide/zine called LCD (Lowest Common Denominator). A compilation book entitled The Best of LCD: The Art and Writing of WFMU, was published by Princeton Architectural Press was compiled and edited by longtime WFMU radio host Dave "The Spazz" Abramson and was published in November 2007.

Ken Freedman talks about FM frequencies and WFMU (1990)

In 1989, he successfully fended off a challenge to the station's license from four rival broadcasters, who claimed that WFMU was broadcasting above its legal power limit.

In 1992, he founded the non-profit organization Auricle Communications, which purchased WFMU's license from Upsala in 1994 one year prior to the college's bankruptcy in 1995.

In 1993 the station launched its website, and in 1997 it began streaming its broadcasts full-time.

Freedman pioneered the use of direct licensing for broadcasters, obtaining alternative copyrights and waivers to address restrictions placed on broadcasters by the Digital Millennium Copyright Act. In 2007, Freedman built on these direct licensing activities and founded WFMU's Free Music Archive, an open source library of copyright-cleared music and audio which launched in April 2009.

In 2013, Freedman initiated the creation of a suite of software for broadcasters, journalists and online publishers known as the Audience Engine.
