= The Good Cop (American TV series) =

American television series

- Genre: Comedy drama; Police procedural
- Created by: Andy Breckman
- Based on: The Good Cop by: Erez Aviram; Tomer Aviram; Yuval Semo
- Starring: Tony Danza; Josh Groban; Monica Barbaro; Isiah Whitlock Jr.; Bill Kottkamp
- Composer: Pat Irwin
- Country of origin: United States
- Original language: English
- No. of seasons: 1
- No. of episodes: 10

Production
- Executive producers: Andy Breckman; Randy Zisk; Howard Klein; Tony Danza
- Production location: New York City
- Cinematography: Eric Moynier
- Editor: Deborah Moran
- Running time: 42–49 minutes
- Production companies: 3 Arts Entertainment; Andy Breckman Productions

Original release
- Network: Netflix
- Release: September 21, 2018

The Good Cop is an American murder-mystery comedy-drama television series created by Andy Breckman, based on an Israeli show of the same name created by Erez and Tomer Aviram. The ten-episode series premiered on Netflix on September 21, 2018. The series was canceled after one season.

== Cast ==
=== Main ===
- Tony Danza as Anthony "Tony" Caruso Sr., a streetwise ex-cop paroled from prison after serving seven years for a corruption conviction. He is tough and stubborn and knows the ins and outs of the criminal underworld. Although prohibited from interacting professionally with active police personnel, he is intent on proving that he still has what it takes to fight crime and solve homicide cases.
- Josh Groban as Anthony "TJ" Caruso Jr., Tony Sr.'s son, a by-the-book NYPD lieutenant who, in contrast to his father, goes to great lengths to avoid departmental infractions, even minor ones.
- Monica Barbaro as Cora Vasquez, an inspector turned homicide detective in the NYPD and Tony Sr.'s parole officer. She is a subordinate of Tony Jr.
- Isiah Whitlock Jr. as Burl Loomis, a veteran NYPD sergeant on the verge of retirement who coasts his way through investigations, making as little effort as possible. He refuses to chase suspects on foot or get out of his car during cold weather.
- Bill Kottkamp as Ryan Domki, a technical crime analyst for the NYPD. He is ultra-nerdy, technologically savvy, and obsessed with electronic devices.

=== Recurring ===
- John Scurti as Wendell Kirk, a barber and Tony Sr.'s friend

=== Guest ===
- Frank Whaley as Joseph Privett
- John Carroll Lynch as Sherman Smalls (Episode 3, "Who Is the Ugly German Lady?")
- Bob Saget as Richie Knight (Episode 6, "Did the TV Star Do It?")
- Rebecca Rittenhouse as Macy Clarke (Episode 7, "Who Killed the Guy on the Ski Lift?")

== Production ==
Netflix announced the new series in June 2017. The show stars Tony Danza as "a disgraced, former NYPD officer who never followed the rules", and Josh Groban as his son, Tony Jr., "an earnest, obsessively honest NYPD detective who makes a point of always following the rules". The show was created and is written by Andy Breckman, who created and wrote the Emmy Award-winning USA Network series Monk.

The main characters are father and son policemen, Tony Caruso Sr. and Jr., who live together. Tony Sr. (Danza) was expelled from law enforcement and arrested for chronic violations of departmental policy, while his son, Tony Jr. (Groban) scrupulously obeys departmental procedures. During one scene in episode 1, two of Tony Jr.'s colleagues reveal that others in the department refer to him sarcastically as the "Choirboy" and "Nancy Drew." In the series, according to Netflix, "This 'odd couple' become unofficial partners as Tony Sr. offers his overly-cautious son blunt, street-wise advice on everything from handling suspects to handling women."

Danza, a native New Yorker, anticipated drawing "on his real-life connection to the NYPD", as a member of the board of directors of the city's Police Athletic League, to develop his character. The first season was filmed in various neighborhoods in Brooklyn.

About the series, Breckman said, "Many cop shows feature dark and provocative material: psycho-sexual killers, twisted, grim, flawed detectives. Many address the most controversial issues of the day. I watch a lot of them. God bless 'em all. But the show I want to produce is playful, family-friendly, and a celebration of old-fashioned puzzle-solving."

Music for the series was composed by Pat Irwin.

== Episodes ==
=== Season 1 (2018) ===
No.	Title	Directed by	Written by	Original release date
1	"Who Framed the Good Cop?"	Randy Zisk	Andy Breckman	September 21, 2018
Tony Caruso Jr. (Josh Groban) is a scrupulously honest, rule-abiding Detective Lieutenant, living in Queens, New York. His father, Tony Caruso Sr. (Tony Danza), is an ex-detective who served eight years in prison for a corruption conviction. Part of Tony Sr.'s parole terms require him to live with his son and stay out of trouble. A former colleague in the department, Jack Livingston, whose testimony was pivotal in sending Tony Sr. to prison and against whom Tony Sr. harbors a grudge, is found dead in a local park.
2	"What Is the Supermodel's Secret?"	Randy Zisk	Andy Breckman	September 21, 2018
While playing poker in a pub, Tony Sr. spies a famous supermodel, Belinda Mannix (Emma Ishta), sitting alone in a booth. He stops the game, goes over and introduces himself to her. After she fails to seem impressed, he saves his number in her phone. Tony Jr. is called to investigate the shooting murder of an aged man, Albert Monte, who is found dead in a hotel room. The investigation reveals that Monte hosted scandalous bachelor parties and was apparently shot by a hitman wearing a giant bunny head; the murderer was caught on a surveillance camera exiting a service elevator. The morning after the poker game, Belinda unexpectedly shows up at the Caruso home, flirts with Tony Sr., and asks to use his phone, which Caruso Sr lost the night before.
3	"Who Is the Ugly German Lady?"	Alex Hardcastle	David Breckman	September 21, 2018
A prison buddy of Tony Sr., Sherman Smalls, escapes from confinement. Around the time of his escape, a woman was murdered in a nearby cabin in the woods and her husband brutally beaten. From a photo, the husband identifies Smalls as the assailant, and a manhunt ensues. Smalls, unaware that the police are looking for him as a murder suspect, shows up at the Caruso home and asks for Tony Sr.'s help.
4	"Will the Good Cop Bowl 300?"	Rodrigo García	Andy Breckman	September 21, 2018
During an amateur bowling league event, the alley's manager Joey Wingate is fatally shot behind the lanes. His death is ruled a suicide, but Cora, who was Wingate's former parole officer, believes he was murdered. Tony Jr. joins his father's bowling team alongside other members of the task force, replacing Ryan, and finds that he is naturally skilled at it. However, he is unaware that the special bowling ball Tony Sr. gave him is a remote-controlled device piloted by Ryan.
5	"Will Big Tony Roll Over?"	Kevin Hooks	Jonathan Collier	September 21, 2018
After their star witness is killed by a car bomb, the FBI brings in Tony Sr. to testify against his former cellmate Remy Derosa, putting him in the Four Seasons with his new wife Debbi (Alanna Ubach). An informant tries to warn Loomis that Tony Sr. is in danger, but Loomis ignores him while focused on an NFL game. The informant gives Loomis a dollar bill with his phone number, but Loomis unknowingly spends it, leading to a frantic search to find the dollar bill.
6	"Did the TV Star Do It?"	Silver Tree	Andy Breckman	September 21, 2018
Beth Landow, the personal assistant to celebrity talk show host Richie Knight (Bob Saget), is found murdered near a river. Tony Jr. suspects Knight is responsible and using his position to cover up his crimes. Tony Sr., who is invited to sing on Knight's show, believes he is innocent.
7	"Who Killed the Guy on the Ski Lift?"	Kevin Hooks	Hy Conrad	September 21, 2018
At an NYPD ski trip in Orange County, Tony Jr. learns his father has signed them up to have a panel on ethics and meets a woman named Macy Clark (Rebecca Rittenhouse). At the lodge, Macy discovers her boyfriend, NYPD officer Andre Rifkin, cheating on her. The next day, Macy and Andre board a ski lift, but by the time it reaches the top, Rifkin is dead, having been stabbed in the chest. Macy is arrested, but Tony Jr. believes her claims of innocence, earning the ire of other officers.
8	"Will Cora Get Married?"	Neema Barnette	Andy Breckman	September 21, 2018
Amid a genealogical search for relatives, Cora meets a man named Warren (Josh Segarra) and they start dating. A few weeks later, they return to Warren's apartment after a night out to find his roommate has been murdered. Tony Sr. finds a cat video filmed on the day of Connie's death that he thinks may provide a clue in her murder.
9	"Why Kill a Busboy?"	Rebecca Asher	Jonathan Collier	September 21, 2018
While Tony Sr. is on a date at an upscale restaurant, two armed robbers stick up the customers before killing a busboy seemingly without cause. Tony Sr. convinces his son to buy and re-open the restaurant with him, which becomes a success but suffers numerous health code violations. The same gunmen soon target another man with the same name as the first victim.
10	"Who Cut Mrs. Ackroyd in Half?"	Randy Zisk	Andy Breckman	September 21, 2018
An elderly woman is killed in an elevator accident, the third death at the same apartment in several months. Suspecting foul play, the division captain sends Tony Jr. and Cora to go undercover and see if any of the residents or staff have handwriting matching a note found in the basement. However, Cora is upset with Tony Jr. after finding a negative performance review he wrote of her. Tony Sr. tries to locate the man who killed Connie.

== Cancellation ==
On November 13, 2018, the series was canceled after one season.
