= Mr. Monk Is Open for Business =

Novel by Hy Conrad

Mr. Monk Is Open For Business
- First edition 2014 hard cover
- Author: Hy Conrad
- Language: English
- Series: Monk mystery novel series
- Genre: Mystery novel
- Publisher: Signet Books
- Publication date: June 3, 2014
- Publication place: United States
- Media type: Print (hardcover)
- ISBN: 978-0-451-47056-0
- Preceded by: Mr. Monk Gets on Board

Mr. Monk Is Open For Business is the eighteenth novel based on the television series Monk. It was published on June 3, 2014. Like the other novels, the story is narrated by Natalie Teeger, Monk's assistant. It is the third novel in the series to be written by Hy Conrad.

== Plot summary ==
Natalie rents an office for herself and Adrian Monk to make their positions as consulting detectives official. Lieutenant Amy Devlin soon comes to them asking for help finding a man who shot and killed three people and managed to elude the police.

== List of characters ==
=== Characters from the television series ===
- Adrian Monk: The titular detective, played in the series by Tony Shalhoub
- Natalie Teeger: Monk's loyal assistant and the narrator of the book, played on the series by Traylor Howard

=== Original characters ===
- Amy Devlin: A lieutenant who is Stottlemeyer's right hand in the San Francisco Police Department
