= Mr. Monk Gets on Board =

2014 novel by Hy Conrad

- First edition 2014 hard cover
- Author: Hy Conrad
- Language: English
- Series: Monk mystery novel series
- Genre: Mystery novel
- Publisher: Signet Books
- Publication date: January 7, 2014
- Publication place: United States
- Media type: Print (hardcover)
- ISBN: 978-0-451-24095-8
- Preceded by: Mr. Monk Helps Himself
- Followed by: Mr. Monk Is Open For Business

Mr. Monk Gets on Board is the seventeenth novel based on the television series Monk. It was published on January 7, 2014. Like the other novels, the story is narrated by Natalie Teeger, Monk's assistant. It is the second novel in the series to be written by Hy Conrad. It was originally meant to be an episode of the show, but was scrapped due to the cruise line company that owned the ship making too many demands.

== Plot summary ==
Natalie completes the requirements and receives a license as a private investigator, and proceeds to attend a business seminar at sea with Adrian Monk. When the alarm is pulled and the ship drops anchor, they discover the dead body of the cruise director in the sea. She has alcohol in her system, so her death is deemed an accident, but Adrian Monk isn't convinced.

== List of characters ==
=== Characters from the television series ===
- Adrian Monk: The titular detective, played in the series by Tony Shalhoub
- Natalie Teeger: Monk's loyal assistant and the narrator of the book, played on the series by Traylor Howard

== Background ==
In his author's note, Hy Conrad said that this novel was adapted from the script for a never-filmed episode of season 3 called "Mr. Monk Is At Sea". The premise of that episode had Monk and Sharona Fleming investigate a murder on a cruise ship. Had the episode been filmed, it probably would have taken the place of "Mr. Monk and the Game Show," the sole episode of the series where none of the supporting cast appear. Conrad noted that while USA Network approved the script, the episode got canned because they were unable to find a real cruise ship to secure for filming, as cruise lines were very sensitive about murders being committed on-board or people falling overboard. The script subsequently ended up in the vault. In the next few seasons, the writers would turn to the script of "Mr. Monk Is At Sea" when running low on ideas and make calls, but it became the show's white whale.

Mr. Monk Gets on Board is described by Conrad as being the plot of "Mr. Monk Is At Sea," but with some changes: the replacement of Sharona with Natalie, the addition of a subplot involving a book collector named Malcolm Leeds, and a visit to Mexico that includes a meeting with Captain Alameda, the San Macros police captain from season 2's "Mr. Monk Goes to Mexico".

== Reception ==
The West Orlando News praised the book and recommended it to fans of the television series.
