= Mistry (TV series) =

- Promotional poster
- Created by: Andy Breckman
- Based on: Monk by Andy Breckman
- Written by: Ritviq Joshi; Aarsh Vora
- Directed by: Rishab Seth
- Starring: Ram Kapoor; Mona Singh; Shikha Talsania; Kshitish Date
- Music by: Sarthak Nakul
- Country of origin: India
- Original language: Hindi
- No. of seasons: 1
- No. of episodes: 8

Production
- Executive producers: Nilamber Majumdar; Alok Jain; Vivek Srivastava; Neha Sinha; Dimpi Dey
- Producers: Deepak Dhar; Rishi Negi; Rajesh Chadha; Mrinalini Jain; Shyam Rathi
- Editor: Sourabh Prabhudesai
- Production companies: Banijay Asia; Universal International Studios

Original release
- Network: JioHotstar
- Release: 27 June 2025

Mistry is a Hindi-language mystery comedy-drama television series directed by Rishab Seth. The series was written by Ritviq Joshi and Aarsh Vora. It stars Ram Kapoor, Mona Singh, Shikha Talsania and Kshitish Date. The show is a franchised adaptation of the award-winning American murder-mystery TV series Monk, created by Andy Breckman.

The series was released on 27 June 2025 on JioHotstar, an Indian subscription video-on-demand streaming service.

== Cast ==
- Ram Kapoor as Armaan Mistry
- Mona Singh as ACP Sehmat Siddiqui
- Shikha Talsania as Sharanya
- Kshitish Date as Inspector Bunty Sawant
- Ankit Dabas as Nishant
- Shraddha Nigam as Sushmita
- Vidhaan Sharma as Shravan

== Reception ==
Archika Khurana of The Times of India gave 3.5 stars and observed that " Watch it for a soulful spin on the classic detective genre and Ram Kapoor’s eccentric performance." Rahul Desai of The Hollywood Reporter India stated that "The official adaptation of the Emmy-winning ‘Monk’ is incurious and functional." Vinamra Mathur of Firstpost gave 3 stars out of 5 and said that "The nature of the performances and background music suggest the tone is going to be perennially light and lunatic but in good ways. And Kapoor surely has a ball playing Armaan Mistry."

Sushmita Dey of Times Now rated it 3/5 stars and observed that "Is Mistry perfect? No. But is it entertaining? Yes, a bit. It’s not a deep dive into crime or psychology, but it offers a fun, breezy watch led by an actor who clearly enjoys being back in the spotlight." Aishwarya Vasudevan of OTT Play rated it 2/5 stars and said that "Ram Kapoor shines in a refreshing role in Mistry, but the show lacks intrigue. Despite solid performances, predictable plots and shallow mysteries make it a forgettable adaptation of Monk." Anindita Mukherjee of News 18 rated it 3.5/5 stars and commented that "Mistry will give you such opportunities in bounty. All in all, if you have been rooting for a show that will make you laugh, think and bite your nails at the same time, Mistry is worth every ounce of your valuable weekend time."

Nandini Ramnath of Scroll.in stated that "Mistry is a pleasant enough time-passer, with a hero who is antsy rather than angsty, troubled rather than traumatised. " Subhash K Jha of News 24 gave 2 stars out of 5 "Director Rishabh Seth allows Ram Kapoor no room to innovate or even move an inch away from the original version. Resultantly the character seems stilted and frozen." Amit Bhatia of ABP News rated it 3/5 stars and said that "Ram Kapoor starrer is a neat (pun intended) little series that won’t revolutionise the genre but offers just enough fun, curiosity, and emotional pull to keep you hooked." Deepa Gahlot of Rediff.com gave it 2.5 stars and noted that "Mistry may work for some, but also raises the question about mental illness being treated as a means of amusement for audiences."

== Controversy ==
In June 2025, actor Ram Kapoor was removed from promotional activities for Mistry after allegations surfaced that he made sexually suggestive and off-colour remarks during a media interaction, causing discomfort among members of the JioHotstar promotional and publicity teams. Following internal review and a formal complaint, the platform decided to cancel his remaining promotional appearances, thereafter conducting media interviews solely with co-star Mona Singh.

In a subsequent statement, Kapoor publicly addressed the controversy, admitting that “everything I’ve been accused of saying, I have said,” and declaring himself “guilty as charged,” while explaining that he did not intend to offend those present and had perceived the environment as casual and friendly. He also said that had he sensed anyone was uncomfortable, he would have corrected himself immediately.
