= Good cop bad cop (disambiguation) =

Good cop, bad cop is a psychological tactic often used in interrogation and negotiation.

Good cop bad cop may also refer to:

== Film and TV ==
- Bon Cop, Bad Cop, a 2006 Canadian dark comedy-thriller buddy cop film
- Good Cop, Bad Cop (film), a 1994 American action thriller film
- "Good Cop, Bad Cop" (NCIS), an episode of the television series NCIS
- "Bad Cop/Good Cop", a character voiced by Liam Neeson in The Lego Movie
- Good Cop Bad Cop Productions, American production company notably behind Live from Daryl's House
- Good Cop/Bad Cop, a 2025 television series

== Music ==
- "Good Cop Bad Cop", a song by Everything but the Girl from their 1996 album Walking Wounded
- "Good Cop/Bad Cop", a song by Blahzay Blahzay from the 1996 album Blah Blah Blah
- "Good Cop Bad Cop", a song by the Poster Children from their 1999 album New World Record
- "Good Cop, Bad Cop" (song), a 2017 song by Ice Cube
- Bad Cop/Bad Cop, California punk rock band

== See also ==
- The Good Cop (disambiguation)
