= GameStop: Rise of the Players =

- Poster
- Directed by: Jonah Tulis
- Produced by: Jonah Tulis; Blake J. Harris; Ben Braun; Dan Braun; Matt Burke
- Music by: Jeff Beal
- Production companies: Submarine Deluxe; Goodlight
- Distributed by: Neon; Super LTD
- Release date: January 28, 2022
- Running time: 94 minutes
- Country: United States
- Language: English
- Box office: $126,297

GameStop: Rise of the Players is a 2022 American documentary film directed by Jonah Tulis and produced by Blake J. Harris, who worked on Console Wars together.

== Synopsis ==
The documentary chronicles the GameStop short squeeze of 2021 which saw GameStop's stock rise over 2,500% amidst rampant volatility. This story is told mostly from the viewpoint of several value investors who participated in sharing their due diligence on social media, most notably Roaring Kitty's YouTube streams.

=== Interviewees ===
- Justin Dopierala, Founder and President of DOMO Capital
- Rod Alzmann, Managing Director at Wook Capital and Co-Founder of research publishing platform GMEdd.com
- Joe Fonicello, Co-Founder of research publishing platform GMEdd.com
- Dmitriy Kozin, Seeking Alpha Contributor (2019–2020)
- Farris Husseini, data analytics professional, former Chewy employee
- Jenn Kruza, Founder of Kruza Capital LLC
- Tom Barton, Founder and President of White Rock Capital
- Jeff Tarzia, YouTuber, Technical Content Developer at AttackIQ
- Abbe Minor, Owner of Sun Built
- Rigoberto Alcaraz, college student, daytrader
- Andrew Left, Author and Editor of Citron Research

== Reception ==
=== Box office ===
In the United States, the film earned $74,782 from 267 theaters in its opening weekend.

=== Critical response ===
The documentary holds a 79% approval rating on Rotten Tomatoes, based on 14 reviews.

Noel Murray at the Los Angeles Times felt that the film was strong from a stylistic and journalistic standpoint and that it did a great job of humanizing the players and supported a business instead of rooting for its failure.

Richard Whittaker at the Austin Chronicle found the documentary to be an "interesting analysis of the bubble in GameStop stock," yet he also criticized its "obnoxious enthusiasm" for not showing that the short squeeze investors are also stock market speculators that left the stock behind in a state as volatile as ever.

Josiah Teal at Film Threat stated the film was "tailor-made for a Reddit-savvy audience," and it "captures the unbridled essence of the Internet in a way gamers and meme-lords will adore."

Owen Good at Polygon stated the film introduced nine ordinary people, "who aren’t just the good guys of this story, they’re the best kinds of subjects a documentarian could want." Agreeing with the film's choice to call these nine investors “heroes,” Good believes the title fits. The senior reporter states that the real victory is the validation these investors found, not because they were proven right, but because they were willing to be wrong with all of their money, and that you can’t say the same about the big guys who lost billions of someone else’s.
