= Mr. Monk Helps Himself =

2013 novel by Hy Conrad

- First edition 2013 hard cover
- Author: Hy Conrad
- Language: English
- Series: Monk mystery novel series
- Genre: Mystery novel
- Publisher: Signet Books
- Publication date: June 4, 2013
- Publication place: United States
- Media type: Print (hardcover)
- Preceded by: Mr. Monk Gets Even
- Followed by: Mr. Monk Gets on Board

Mr. Monk Helps Himself is the sixteenth novel based on the television series Monk. It was published on June 4, 2013. Like the other novels, the story is narrated by Natalie Teeger, Monk's assistant. It is the first novel in the series to be written by Hy Conrad.

== Plot summary ==
Adrian Monk decides that it is time for Natalie Teeger to become a private detective to better aid him when solving cases. However, they come to a disagreement when Natalie wants to take the case of a woman whose apparent suicide starts to look like murder and Monk is more interested in a clown killed by poisoned money.

== List of characters ==
=== Characters from the television series ===
- Adrian Monk: The titular detective, played in the series by Tony Shalhoub
- Natalie Teeger: Monk's loyal assistant and the narrator of the book, played on the series by Traylor Howard
