= Mr. Monk and the End =

- Monk episodes
- Trudy gives her last gift to Adrian, hours before she is murdered
- Episode nos.: Season 8 Episodes 15 & 16
- Directed by: Randall Zisk
- Written by: Andy Breckman
- Original air dates: November 27, 2009; December 4, 2009

Guest appearances
- Craig T. Nelson as Ethan Rickover; John Edward Lee as Joey Kazarinsky; Emmy Clarke as Julie Teeger; Héctor Elizondo as Dr. Neven Bell; Melora Hardin as Trudy Monk; Alona Tal as Molly Evans; Casper Van Dien as Lt. Steven Albright; D. B. Woodside as Dr. Matthew Shuler; Ed Begley, Jr. as Dr. Malcolm Nash; Shelly Cole as Edie Kazarinsky

Episode chronology
← Previous "Mr. Monk and the Badge"	Next → —
- Monk (season 8)

"Mr. Monk and the End" is the two-part series finale of the American comedy drama detective television series Monk. It consists of the fifteenth and sixteenth episodes of the eighth and final season, and the 124th and 125th episodes of the series overall. The series follows Adrian Monk (Tony Shalhoub), a private detective with obsessive–compulsive disorder and multiple phobias, and his assistant Natalie Teeger (Traylor Howard). In the finale, twelve years after his wife Trudy's (Melora Hardin) murder, Monk receives a message identifying her killer.

"Mr. Monk and the End" was written by Andy Breckman and directed by Randall Zisk. "Part 1" aired in the United States on the USA Network on November 27, 2009, and was watched by 5.8 million viewers. When "Part 2" aired on December 4, 2009, it set a series high and a new viewership record for the most watched episode of a regular drama series ever in basic cable with 9.4 million viewers. The finale received generally positive reviews from critics, who praised Shalhoub's performance and the overall resolution of the series.

== Plot ==
In a flashback to December 14, 1997, Trudy Monk asks her husband about his latest investigation, the disappearance of a midwife named Wendy Stroud. Monk and Captain Stottlemeyer question Dr. Malcolm Nash, director of the birthing center where Stroud worked. Stottlemeyer receives a phone call and informs Monk that Trudy has been killed.

In the present day, a case takes Monk back to the same birthing clinic; Dr. Nash had been shot dead while digitizing patient records. Monk concludes that the murder was committed by a professional hitman, and the police find a partial fingerprint matched to Joey Kazarinski. Seeking a search warrant for Joey's home from Judge Ethan Rickover, the group overhear Rickover telling his wife that he will never move out of his house, even though he has been nominated for the State Supreme Court. That night, Kazarinski's employer instructs him to kill Monk.

When attending a dinner the following day at Natalie's house, Monk is poisoned with a powerful synthetic toxin based on ricin. Stottlemeyer forms a task force to find out who hired the hitman to kill Dr. Nash and what poison was used on Monk. The group track down Kazarinski to a train station, only for him to be hit by a freight train and killed.

Resigned that he now has no hope of surviving the poison, Monk unwraps his last present from Trudy. It contains a videotape recording, where Trudy confesses to having had an affair with Rickover when he was a law professor at Berkeley. The affair resulted in a child, which only lived for a few minutes. Trudy suspected that Rickover was killing everyone who knew about the affair, but opted to meet with him anyway.

Immediately after using a hand wipe, Natalie exhibits the poisoning symptoms. Natalie realizes that the poison was planted in Monk's hand wipes; the hospital is given this information to make an antidote.

Monk goes to Rickover's house and forces Rickover to dig up the remains of Wendy Stroud, which Monk intuited were under a sundial which Rickover illogically placed in the shade of a tree. Twelve years ago, Stroud told Rickover she intended to tell the press about his affair with Trudy and their child. He murdered her, and buried her in his front yard, which explains why he refused to move. Rickover also killed Trudy, as she was the only person who could connect Stroud's disappearance to him. Twelve years later, Dr. Nash came across references to the child when digitizing the birthing clinic's patient records, and thus suspected what had happened to Stroud. He blackmailed Rickover, who hired Kazarinski to kill him and poison Monk so he would be unable to take revenge for Trudy. Rickover steals Monk's gun and commits suicide after cryptically telling Monk to "take care of her".

Despite having finally found closure from Trudy's murder, Monk is bothered by Rickover's last words. A few days later, Monk finds an old newspaper article concerning Stroud's disappearance, and discovers that Trudy's child did not die, but was adopted. Stottlemeyer tracks her down. Monk meets Trudy's daughter, Molly Evans, who, much like her mother, is a writer, working as a film critic for a local paper. Monk considers retiring from detective work to spend time with Molly, but Molly encourages him to use his gift to continue helping people. Randy tells Stottlemeyer he is moving to Summit, New Jersey to take over as Chief of Police, and that he and Sharona Fleming are moving in together.

Monk's relationship with Molly is transformative, leading Monk to a more relaxed and outgoing approach reflected by his exchanging his usual collared shirt and buttoned-up blazer for more casual dress and making trips to the beach and the movies. A montage shows flashbacks from throughout the series and clips of the main characters in the present day: Stottlemeyer getting ready for work and embracing his wife, Randy setting up his desk in Summit, and Monk and Natalie arriving at another crime scene.

== Production ==
The idea of Monk being poisoned had been discussed by the Monk writers for almost as long as the series had been on the air, but the head writer and creator, Andy Breckman, opted to hold it off for the series finale. The writers had no idea what Trudy's present was when they introduced it in previous episodes, and the idea of it being a videotape naming Trudy's killer was inspired by a 2002 FedEx commercial which parodied the 2000 film Cast Away. In Cast Away, a FedEx employee is stranded on a desert island for four years, during which he utilizes several items in his assigned deliveries to aid in his survival, but leaves one package unopened to give him purpose. The commercial depicted a similar FedEx employee delivering the unopened package following his long stranding, only to learn that it contained items which would have alleviated or outright resolved his situation quickly, such as a satellite phone. Breckman thought this was a good plot idea and so used a parallel plotline for Trudy's gift.

Both episodes of "Mr. Monk and the End" were shot as a single production over 17 days (by comparison, most Monk episodes were shot individually on an 8-day schedule). The final scene filmed for "Mr. Monk and the End" (and thus for the series overall) was the scene in "Part 1" where Dr. Matthew Shuler informs Monk that the final stages of the poisoning are vomiting followed by death. Tony Shalhoub, who played Adrian Monk and was an executive producer on the show, felt this was a good scene to end the series on, because it involved all four of the main cast members working together.

The six-fingered hand in the scene where Trudy dies was unscripted. The director, Randy Zisk, came up with this nod to "Mr. Monk Is on the Run", which established the retcon that it was Frank Nunn (who has six fingers on one hand) and not Warwick Tennyson who built and planted the bomb which killed Trudy.

Ethan Rickover's house was designed to be incongruously modest for a judge's home, in order to reflect the fact that he bought the house when he was just a law professor and had not moved since then in order to conceal the body in the yard.

The train station scene in "Part 1" was filmed on location in Los Angeles Union Station, except for the announcer's room, which was a set with a blue screen background. The crew could not lock down the location for filming, so while the scene uses a substantial number of extras, most of the people in it were real travelers. For the part where Randy's inadvertent announcement of a killer loose in the station causes a mass panic, Zisk simply announced the nature of the scene they were filming over the station's PA and said they would appreciate it if anyone wanted to participate, and most of the travelers obliged by running and screaming on cue. For the subsequent chase sequence, Ted Levine (who played Leland Stottlemeyer) performed most of his own stunts.

The character Molly Evans was based on Breckman's daughter Rachel, and named after his daughter Molly and son Evan.

David Hoberman, one of the primary creators behind Monk, had an association with Randy Newman, the writer of the show's theme song "It's a Jungle Out There", so he asked him to come up with a new song for the finale. This song, "When I'm Gone", plays over the montage at the end.

== Reception ==
=== Critical reception ===
"Mr. Monk and the End" has received generally positive reviews. Allison Waldman of TvSquad called the cliffhanger at the end of "Part 1" great and said that she was "dying to know how [it would be] resolved". She also praised Tony Shalhoub's acting in the bed scene in which he talks to Trudy. Waldman called the drama "tense" in "Part 2", and praised Shalhoub and Craig T. Nelson's acting. Jonah Krakow of IGN had mixed feelings about the finale, saying that Molly's introduction was a nice way to send the show off, although he felt cheated that the show's biggest mystery was figuratively handed to Monk in a box. Like Waldman, he praised Shalhoub's and Nelson's acting, and the tension of their scene in which Nelson digs up the midwife's body. He gave the episode an 8 out of 10. The A.V. Club's Emily VanDerWerff called it "a surprisingly sweet ending to a show that I haven't watched regularly in a few years", and gave it a "B+".

=== Ratings ===
"Part 1" gained 5.8 million viewers. "Part 2" set various records in television history, with 9.4 million viewers. It was the series high (previously set by the prior season's finale "Mr. Monk Fights City Hall"), USA Network's most-watched scripted television show (previously set by Burn Notice), and basic cable's most-watched hour-long drama (previously set by The Closer with 9.2 million viewers).

=== Awards and nominations ===
Tony Shalhoub was nominated for the 2010 Primetime Emmy Award for Outstanding Lead Actor in a Comedy Series for this episode. Additionally, Randy Newman won the 2010 Primetime Emmy Award for Original Outstanding Music and Lyrics for the song "When I'm Gone".
