= Still Laugh-In: The Stars Celebrate =

- Written by: Jon Macks
- Starring: Tony Hale; Tiffany Haddish; Neil Patrick Harris
- Country of origin: United States
- Original language: English

Production
- Producer: George Schlatter
- Running time: 60 minutes

Original release
- Network: Netflix
- Release: May 14, 2019

Still Laugh-In: The Stars Celebrate is a Netflix variety special written by Jon Macks, narrated by Tiffany Haddish and Neil Patrick Harris and filmed at the Dolby Theatre in Los Angeles. It is a tribute to Rowan & Martin's Laugh-In, the American sketch comedy television program that ran for 140 episodes from January 22, 1968, to March 12, 1973, on the NBC television network, hosted by comedians Dan Rowan and Dick Martin.

== Premise ==
In Still Laugh-In: The Stars Celebrate, the hosts plays clips from the original series, and intercuts them with new takes on the show’s classic recurring bits by original cast members like Ruth Buzzi, Arte Johnson, Judy Carne, Jo Anne Worley, Goldie Hawn and more.

== Cast ==
- Tony Hale
- Tiffany Haddish
- Neil Patrick Harris
- Michael Douglas
- Rita Moreno
- Natasha Leggero
- Rob Riggle
- Rita Wilson
- Lily Tomlin
- Billy Crystal
- Brad Garrett
- Taye Diggs
- Lisa Ann Walter
- Nikki Glaser
- Jon Lovitz
- Ruth Buzzi
- Goldie Hawn
- Arte Johnson
- Judy Carne (archive footage)
- Jo Anne Worley

== Release ==
'Still Laugh-In: The Stars Celebrate' was released on May 14, 2019 on Netflix.
