= Erez Aviram =

Israeli television screenwriter and editor

- ארז אבירם
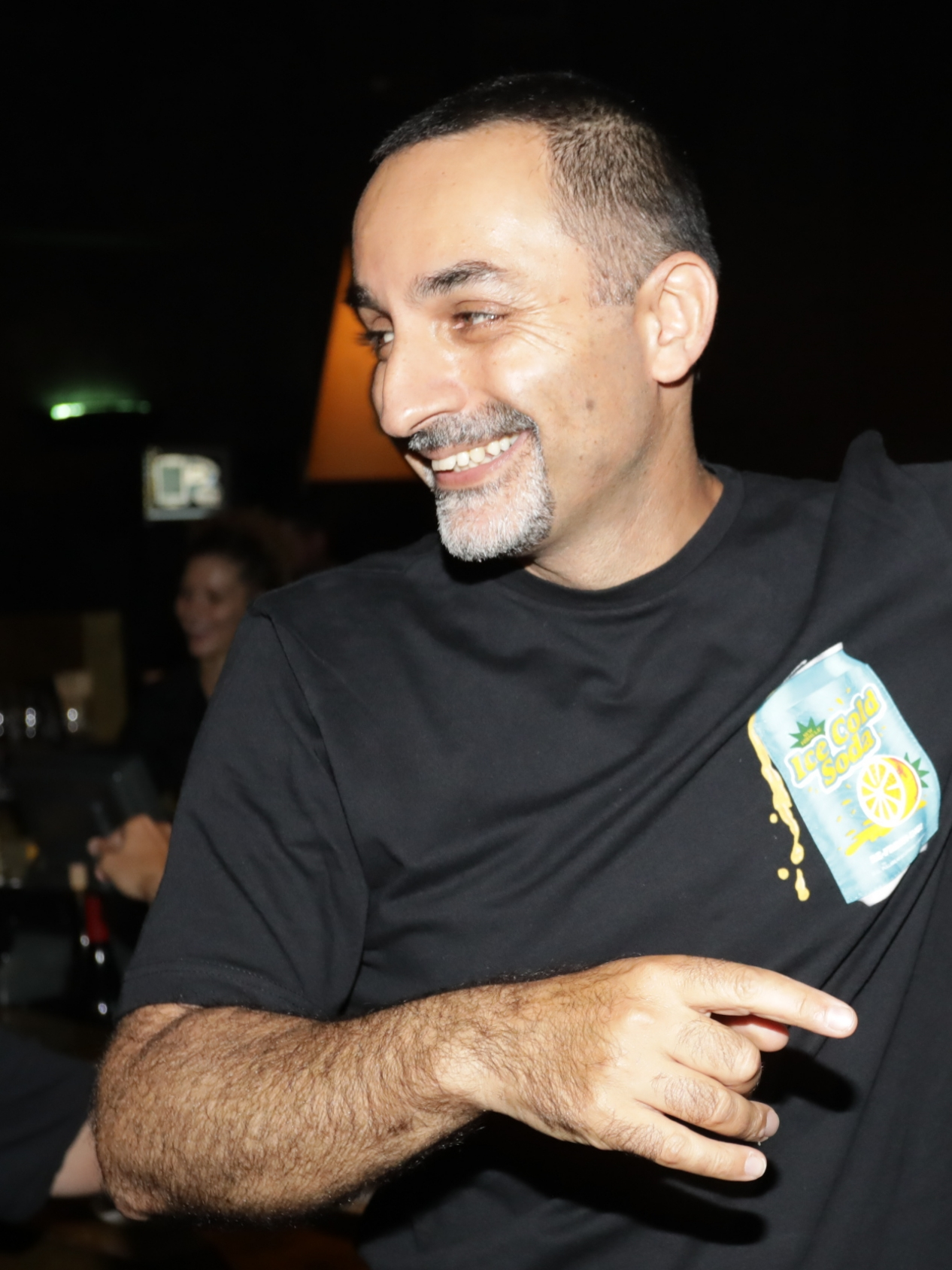
- Born: November 20, 1968 (age 57)
- Writing career
- Genre: Comedy
- Notable work: Eretz Nehederet

Erez Aviram (Hebrew: ארז אבירם; Born November 20, 1968) is an Israeli television screenwriter and editor known for his work on the comedy shows Eretz Nehederet and Hashoter Hatov (The Good Cop).

== Career ==
Aviram began his professional career as a journalist and editor for the Israeli news company Yediot Aharonot. He then moved to the advertising world, where he worked as a copywriter for leading advertising companies. In 2004, Aviram started writing for television.

Between 2006 and 2013, Aviram acted as head writer and editor for several satires such as: Season 3 of Kan Garim Bekef, the Israeli version of the French-Canadian sitcom, Les Parents, which aired on Channel 10. Aviram created several shows for the Israeli Children's Channel. His latest, the edutainment series Rewind, produced for the Israeli Educational Television, is a mockumentary about the nation's most important historical moments.

Aviram was a chief writer and editor for more than ten years on some of Israel's most successful satirical shows in Israel, such as Eretz Nehederet (Keshet), Haretzua (HOT), Shavua Sof (Reshet), and Ahorey HaChadashot (Channel 14).

== The Good Cop ==
Aviram co-created with his brother, Tomer Aviram, the series Hashoter Hatov (The Good Cop), Israel's first and only police comedy series, which debuted in 2015, on yes. The series, on which he serves as head writer, tells the story of Danny Konfino, a cop stationed in a small town, and his oddball colleagues. The show is currently on its third season.

== Other projects ==
Aviram is also an app developer. Recently he developed Bayoosh, which allows users to reject phone callers with a smile by choosing from a wide range of funny and personalized rejection messages. The messages are written by the app's users, and other can choose the one that is most appropriate at that moment.
