= Jeff Beal =

American composer (born 1963)

Jeff Beal (born June 20, 1963) is an American composer of music for film, television, and the concert hall. Highly regarded as a jazz instrumentalist and versatile composer, Beal creates music that often incorporates a synthesis of improvisatory and composed elements.

== Early life ==
Beal was born in Hayward, California, United States and began trumpet studies in the third grade after attending a school music assembly at Castro Valley's Marshall Elementary School with his father. Upon hearing the trumpet played, he chose it as his instrument. Beal's grandmother, Irene Beal, was an accomplished pianist, professional silent-movie accompanist, and fan of trumpeter Miles Davis. She gave Jeff a recording of Miles' collaboration with Gil Evans, Sketches of Spain. Beal wrote his first long-form composition for the Oakland Youth Symphony Orchestra while a student at Castro Valley High School. OYSO conductor Kent Nagano had Jeff combine his love of jazz improvisation with an orchestral accompaniment. This merging of improvisation with classical composition has remained a hallmark of Beal's music. Beal went on to study composition and trumpet at the Eastman School of Music in Rochester, New York, and graduated in 1985 with a Bachelor of Music degree.

== Jazz career ==
Beal married a fellow Eastman graduate, soprano Joan (Sapiro) Beal, and the pair moved from Rochester to New York City. It was there Beal composed and recorded his debut album, Liberation, for Island Records. Beal's jazz band went on to perform at The Blue Note and the Montreux Jazz Festival. At the request of Chick Corea, Beal composed and recorded a concerto for the virtuosic jazz bassist, John Patitucci, for Corea's Stretch Records label. Beal's signature work, Alternate Route, was composed for improvised trumpet and orchestra. Written fifteen years after his first long form composition, this piece was again premiered by Kent Nagano and the Berkeley Symphony Orchestra, with Beal as trumpet soloist. He has also composed improvisatory concerti for Dave Samuels, Larry Coombs, and Turtle Island String Quartet.

== Film and television composing ==
In the mid-1990s, Beal relocated to Los Angeles. His first critical notice came in 2001, for his "hypnotic combination of minimalist rhythmic drive and Americana" score to Ed Harris' directorial debut, Pollock. He has since been nominated for nineteen primetime Emmy Awards, and has won five, His first statue was awarded in 2003 for his main theme to the USA Network detective series Monk. His other Emmy nominations include HBO's evocative Depression era series Carnivàle and epic drama Rome, as well as four nominations and two wins for Netflix's House of Cards. Beal is noted for composing most of his music at his home, without assistants or orchestrators, playing most of the instruments himself. For House of Cards, he added strings by recording a 17-piece string ensemble in the living room of his home. He recently completed the score for Rodrigo García's Raymond & Ray for which he composed and performed all of the jazz trumpet solos mimed by actor Ethan Hawke.

== Concert works ==
Beal has a catalogue of 35 concert works, published by ESC, including many commissioned orchestral, choral and dance compositions. Beal has conducted his own music with a variety of orchestras, including the Boston Symphony Orchestra in the recording of the score to "Boston", a feature-length documentary on the history of the Boston Marathon the National Symphony Orchestra in House of Cards in Concert at the Kennedy Center, and the Los Angeles Chamber Orchestra performing Beal's new score for Buster Keaton's "The General". He was commissioned by the St. Louis Symphony Orchestra to compose a new song cycle for Grammy winner Hilá Plittman in honor of Leonard Slatkin’s fifty years with the Orchestra. "The Paperlined Shack", Beal's first album of exclusively his concert music was released in June 2022 on Supertrain Records featuring the titular song cycle performed by Plittman and the Eastman Philharmonia conducted by Leonard Slatkin and his string quartet "Things Unseen" performed by The New Hollywood String Quartet.

Beal also collaborated with the dance nonprofit vildwerk., which aims to increase environmental conservation awareness through dance. His commissioned score for Buglisi Dance Theatre’s Moss Anthology, choreographed by Jacqulyn Buglisi, was performed as Variation #5 for vildwerk.'s inaugural program, Time to Protect Our Planet in 2024. Though Moss Anthology: Variation #5 had previously been performed as a work in progress, CriticalDance.org reported the performance was complete at the Time to Protect Our Planet event.

In June 2026, the completed version of Moss was performed by the Buglisi Dance Theatre at Bryant Park’s Summer Stage at vildwerk.'s Dancing For The Wild program.

== Personal life ==
Beal disclosed that in 2007 that he had been diagnosed with multiple sclerosis. He attributes the stabilization of the disease's symptoms in part to his busy schedule and the concentration required to compose, and to treating his MS as a vascular disease with lifestyle intervention and venoplasty.

== Selected film credits ==
- A Gentleman's Game
- The Biggest Little Farm
- The Price of Everything
- Bigger
- Shock and Awe
- Generation Wealth
- An Inconvenient Sequel: Truth to Power
- The Sweet Life
- Spirit of the Marathon II
- Blackfish
- The Queen of Versailles
- Appaloosa
- The Deal
- Spirit of the Marathon
- Athlete A
- He's Way More Famous Than You
- Once Fallen
- Raymond & Ray
- The Company
- Where God Left His Shoes
- He Was a Quiet Man
- The Situation
- Emmanuel's Gift
- In the Realms of the Unreal
- Pollock
- Breaking News in Yuba County
- Jay Sebring....Cutting to the Truth
- GameStop: Rise of the Players

== Selected television credits ==
- House of Cards
- The Long Road Home
- The Putin Interviews
- GCB
- Monk
- Ugly Betty
- Rome
- Nightmares & Dreamscapes
- Carnivàle
- Back When We Were Grownups
- The Dovekeepers
- The Wool Cap
- Big Driver
- Door to Door
- Medium
- In Plain Sight
- Challenger: The Final Flight
- Jesse Stone television films
- All Her Fault

== Discography ==
Year	Album
1987	Liberation
1988	Perpetual Motion
1991	Objects in the Mirror
1993	Three Graces
1994	Contemplations
1996	The Gathering with Joan Beal
1997	Alternate Route
1998	Red Shift
2001	Pollock Original Soundtrack to film by Ed Harris
2004	Monk
2003	Tibet: Cry of the Snow Lion
2004	Carnivàle
2007	Rome
2016	Jesse Stone
2018	House of Cards Symphony
2022	GameStop: Rise of the Players
2024	New York Études
2026	New York Études, Volume II
2026	Body in Motion
