= Monk (TV series) =

American mystery comedy-drama television series (2002–2009)

- Genre: Police procedural; Comedy drama; Mystery
- Created by: Andy Breckman
- Starring: Tony Shalhoub; Bitty Schram; Jason Gray-Stanford; Ted Levine; Traylor Howard
- Opening theme: Instrumental theme by Jeff Beal (seasons 1–2); "It's a Jungle Out There" by Randy Newman (seasons 2–8)
- Composer: Jeff Beal
- Country of origin: United States
- Original language: English
- No. of seasons: 8
- No. of episodes: 125 (list of episodes)

Production
- Executive producers: Andy Breckman; David Hoberman; Tony Shalhoub; Tom Scharpling; Rob Thompson; Randy Zisk
- Camera setup: Single-camera
- Running time: 40–45 minutes
- Production companies: Mandeville Films; Touchstone Television; USA Cable Entertainment (seasons 1–3); Universal Media Studios (seasons 1–6) (Note: Credited as Universal Network Television (seasons 1–3) and NBC Universal Television Studio (seasons 3–6)); Universal Cable Productions (seasons 7–8)

Original release
- Network: USA Network
- Release: July 12, 2002 – December 4, 2009

Related
- Mr. Monk's Last Case (2023); Psych (2006-2014)

Monk is an American mystery comedy-drama television series that originally ran on the USA Network from July 12, 2002, to December 6, 2009, with 125 episodes broadcast over eight seasons. It follows Adrian Monk (Tony Shalhoub), a private detective with obsessive–compulsive disorder (OCD) and multiple phobias, and his assistants Sharona Fleming (Bitty Schram) and Natalie Teeger (Traylor Howard). Monk works with the San Francisco Police Department in solving unconventional cases while investigating his wife's unsolved murder. The show also explores the main characters' personal lives and struggles.

First envisioned by ABC as an Inspector Clouseau–type police show, the series' premise of a detective with obsessive–compulsive disorder originated with David Hoberman in 1998, while Andy Breckman, who is credited as creator, wrote the pilot episode by taking inspiration from Sherlock Holmes. Monk went through two years of development hell due to difficulties finding an actor for the main role. After USA Network took over production and Shalhoub was cast, the series' pilot was shot in Vancouver, British Columbia in 2001. Subsequent episodes of the first season were filmed in Toronto, Ontario, and the remainder of the series was shot primarily in Los Angeles, California.

Monk received critical acclaim and awards throughout its run, including eight Emmy Awards, one Golden Globe Award, and two Screen Actors Guild Awards. The two-part series finale aired on November 27 and December 4, 2009. The final episode held the record for the most-watched scripted cable television drama from 2009 to 2012 (subsequently broken by The Walking Dead) with 9.4 million viewers. A follow-up film, Mr. Monk's Last Case: A Monk Movie, premiered on Peacock on December 8, 2023, with a script written by Breckman and the main cast reprising their roles from the series.

== Premise ==
Adrian Monk was a brilliant homicide investigator with the San Francisco Police Department until the death of his wife Trudy exacerbated his obsessive–compulsive disorder (OCD) to the point he could no longer serve on the force. His depression and multiple phobias caused him to become homebound. After refusing to leave his house for over three years, Monk, with the help of his nurse and assistant Sharona Fleming, begins working as a private detective and consultant for the police while continuing to investigate Trudy's unsolved murder. Monk helps Captain Leland Stottlemeyer and Lieutenant Randy Disher solve baffling cases and undergoes therapy with the goal of being reinstated on the police force. Following Sharona's departure from San Francisco, Monk finds a new assistant in Natalie Teeger, a young widow and single mother.

While Monk's personal challenges and compulsions often cause problems and frustration for both himself and those around him, his observational skills and keen attention to detail enable him to solve cases through unconventional means. His 312 phobias include germs, needles, birds, heights, dentists, milk, death, snakes, lightning, mushrooms, nudity, certain animals, crowds and enclosed spaces. Most episodes in the series follow the whodunit format, while several others use the Inverted Detective Story structure.

== Cast and characters ==
=== Main cast ===
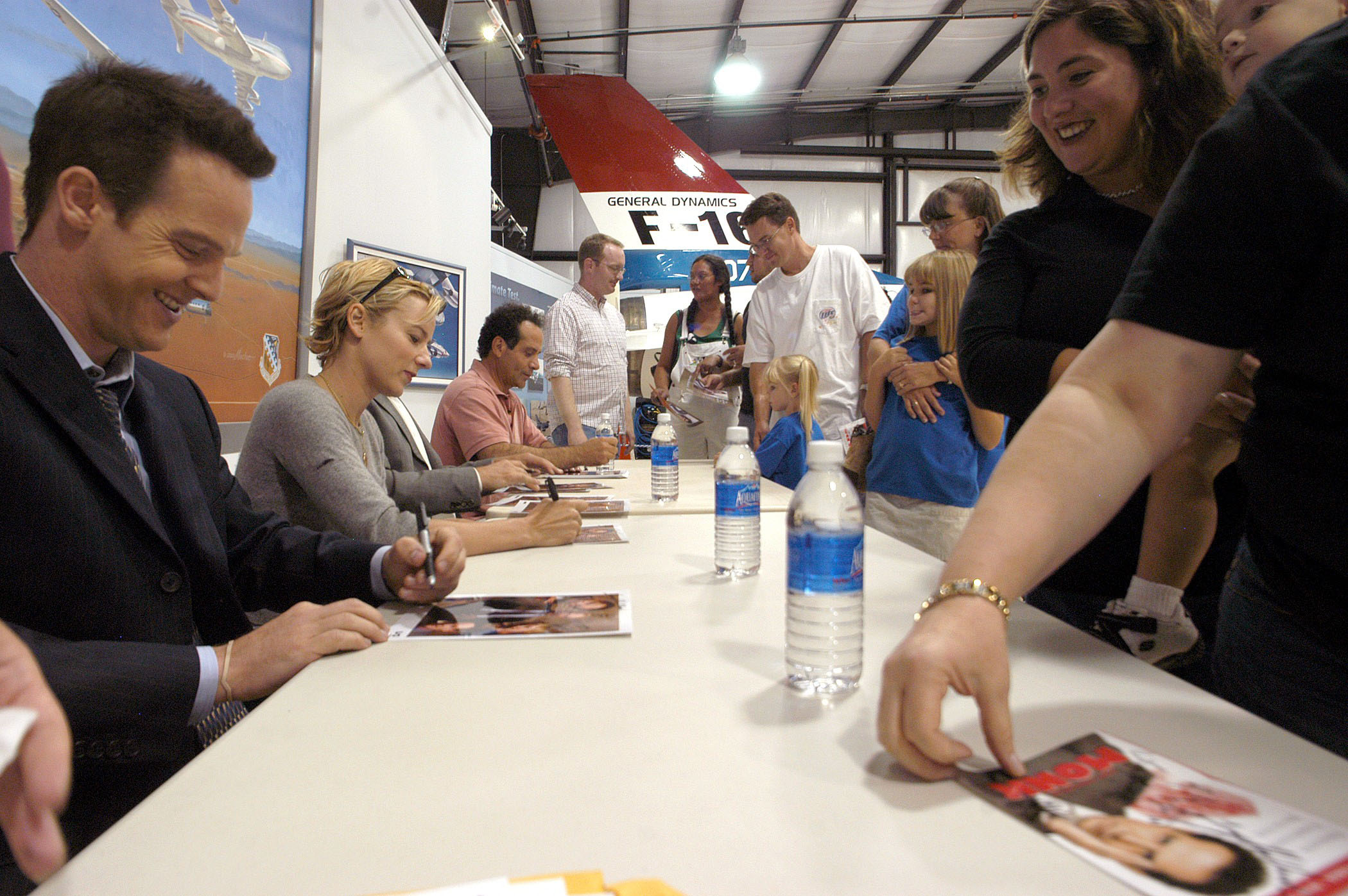
The cast of Monk signing autographs at Edwards Air Force Base. From left to right: Jason Gray-Stanford, Traylor Howard, and Tony Shalhoub.

- Tony Shalhoub as Adrian Monk: the "defective detective" and a renowned former homicide investigator who works as a private consultant for the San Francisco Police Department. He has obsessive–compulsive disorder and multiple phobias, all of which intensified after the murder of his wife Trudy, resulting in his suspension from the department. Monk helps the police solve unconventional crimes and undergoes therapy with the ultimate goal of overcoming his grief, taking control of his phobias and disorder, and being reinstated as a police detective.
- Bitty Schram as Sharona Fleming (seasons 1–3; guest season 8): Monk's personal nurse and first assistant, and a single mother with a son named Benjy. Sharona is often hard on Monk and refuses to baby him. She leaves the show when she moves to New Jersey to remarry her ex-husband.
- Jason Gray-Stanford as Lieutenant Randy Disher: Captain Stottlemeyer's second-in-command at the San Francisco Police Department's Homicide Division. Randy is naive and slightly dim and often poses far-fetched theories and comments about the cases that Monk works on. But he is a loyal friend and skilled police officer who handles himself adeptly in investigations and tactical maneuvers.
- Ted Levine as Captain Leland Stottlemeyer: the head of the San Francisco Police Department's Homicide Division. He and Monk have been good friends since their early days on the police force. Stottlemeyer is initially annoyed and reluctant to work with Monk due to his phobias, but grows to respect his friend and former colleague's observational abilities.
- Traylor Howard as Natalie Teeger (seasons 3–8): Monk's second personal assistant and a young widow with a daughter named Julie. Although Natalie is more deferential and patient with her boss than Sharona was, often referring to him as "Mr. Monk", she is not hesitant to call Monk out when she feels he is being unfair or unreasonable.

=== Supporting ===
- Stanley Kamel as Dr. Charles Kroger (seasons 1–6), Monk's first psychiatrist. He was said to have died of a heart attack after Kamel's death on April 8, 2008.
- Kane Ritchotte (pilot episode & seasons 2–3) and Max Morrow (season 1) as Benjy Fleming, Sharona's son.
- Stellina Rusich (seasons 1–2) and Melora Hardin (seasons 3–8) as Trudy Monk, a former journalist and Monk's deceased wife. Monk's efforts to solve her murder form the overarching storyline of the series.
- Jarrad Paul as Kevin Dorfman (seasons 2–5 & 7), an accountant and Monk's talkative and nosy upstairs neighbor.
- Tim Bagley as Harold Krenshaw (seasons 3 & 5–8), another patient of Dr. Kroger's with obsessive compulsive disorder who develops a rivalry with Monk due to their incompatible compulsions.
- Emmy Clarke as Julie Teeger (seasons 3–8), Natalie's daughter who grows to respect Monk and comes to see him as a father figure.
- Héctor Elizondo as Dr. Neven Bell (seasons 7–8), Monk's second psychiatrist who replaces Dr. Kroger.

== Episodes ==
Viewership and ratings per season of Monk
Season	Timeslot (ET)	Episodes	First aired		Last aired		TV season
Season	Timeslot (ET)	Episodes	Date	Viewers (millions)	Date	Viewers (millions)	TV season
1	Friday 9:00 pm (1); Friday 10:00 pm (2–13)	13	July 12, 2002	4.76	October 18, 2002	4.25	2002–03
2	Friday 10:00 pm	16	June 20, 2003	5.43	March 5, 2004	5.51	2003–04
3	Friday 10:00 pm	16	June 18, 2004	5.54	March 4, 2005	4.44	2004–05
4	Friday 10:00 pm	16	July 8, 2005	6.38	March 17, 2006	5.36	2005–06
5	Friday 9:00 pm (1–8, 10–16); Friday 10:00 pm (9)	16	July 7, 2006	5.09	March 2, 2007	5.71	2006–07
6	Friday 9:00 pm	16	July 13, 2007	4.82	February 22, 2008	6.88	2007–08
7	Friday 9:00 pm	16	July 18, 2008	5.64	February 20, 2009	5.54	2008–09
8	Friday 9:00 pm	16	August 7, 2009	5.14	December 4, 2009	9.44	2009–10

== Production ==
According to an interview with executive producer David Hoberman, ABC first conceived the series as a police show with an Inspector Clouseau-like character with OCD. Hoberman said ABC wanted Michael Richards, who had starred as a private investigator in The Michael Richards Show two years earlier, for the show, but Richards turned it down. Hoberman brought in Andy Breckman as creator, and Breckman, inspired by Sherlock Holmes, introduced Dr. Kroger as a Doctor Watson-like character and an Inspector Lestrade-like character who eventually became Captain Stottlemeyer.

Although ABC originated the show, the network handed it off to the USA Network. USA is now owned by NBC (NBC Universal). Monk was the first Touchstone Television-produced show aired on USA Network instead of ABC. Although ABC initially refused Monk, they did air repeats of the show on ABC between June and November 2002, and then again between March and May 2004. On January 12, 2006, USA Network announced that Monk had been picked up through at least season six as one of the "highest-rated series in cable history."

Season five premiered Friday, July 7, 2006, at 9:00 pm Eastern time. This marked the first time change for the program, which aired at 10:00 pm during its first four seasons. The change allowed the show to work as a lead-in to a new USA Network series, Psych, another offbeat detective program. Monk followed a consistent format of airing half of its 16 episodes in midyear and the second half early the following year, with the exception of the first season, which broadcast entirely from July through October 2002, and the final season, which broadcast entirely between August and December 2009.

Previously aired episodes of Monk began airing on NBC Universal sibling network NBC April 6, 2008. NBC eyed the show because its block with Psych could be plugged into NBC's schedule intact. The shows were being used to increase the scripted programming on the network as production of its own scripted programming ramped back up following the writers' strike. Ratings for the broadcast debut were well below NBC averages for the time period. The show came in third behind Big Brother 9 on CBS and Oprah's Big Give on ABC.

=== Location ===
Although set in the San Francisco Bay Area, Monk is for the most part shot elsewhere except for occasional exteriors featuring city landmarks. The pilot episode was shot in Vancouver, British Columbia, with some location shooting in San Francisco, and the subsequent season-one episodes were shot in the Toronto, Ontario area. Most of the episodes from seasons two through six were filmed in the Los Angeles area, including sets for Monk's apartment, the police station and Stottlemeyer's office, Dr. Kroger's office, and Natalie's house.

In the later part of season four, some on-location filming was done in San Francisco. Many portions of the episode "Mr. Monk and the Big Reward" were shot on location, including a climactic chase scene where Monk and Natalie are chased by three bounty hunters.

=== Theme music ===
During the first season of Monk, the series used a jazzy instrumental introduction to the show by songwriter Jeff Beal, performed by guitarist Grant Geissman. The theme won the 2003 Emmy Award for Outstanding Original Main Title Theme Music.

NYC actor Colter Rule was hired by USA Network to do all radio and TV promotions for the series from its inception, lending an ironic, understated tone that contributed to the show's early popularity. The original tag was "Monk! America's Favorite Defective Detective!" When season two began, the series received a new theme song, titled "It's a Jungle Out There", by Randy Newman. Reaction to the new theme was mixed. A review of season two in the New York Daily News included a wish that producers would revert to the original theme. Shalhoub expressed his support for the new theme in USA Today, saying its "dark and mournful sound,… [its] tongue-in-cheek, darkly humorous side… completely fits the tone of the show". Newman was awarded the 2004 Emmy Award for Outstanding Original Main Title Theme Music for "It's a Jungle Out There".

Randy Newman also wrote a new song for the final episode entitled "When I'm Gone". The song was released on iTunes on December 1, 2009, and won the 2010 Emmy Award for Outstanding Original Music and Lyrics.

== Syndication ==
Over the years, the show was syndicated on MyNetworkTV from 2010 to 2014. Other networks include Ion Television, WE tv, Sundance TV, MeTV, WGN America, Universal HD, Heroes & Icons, IFC, Cozi TV, Hallmark Mystery and GET.

== Accolades ==
The series won eight Emmy Awards, one Golden Globe Award, and two Screen Actors Guild Awards.

== Foreign adaptations ==
A Turkish adaptation titled Galip Derviş began airing on Kanal D in March 2013, the same name used when it first aired the original Monk in the 2000s.

An Indian adaptation, Mistry, was announced in 2025. Ram Kapoor stars as Armaan Mistry, the equivalent to Adrian Monk.

Country/language	Local title	Channel	Date aired/premiered
India	Mistry	JioHotstar	June 27, 2025 –
Turkey	Galip Derviş	Kanal D	March 21, 2013 – December 28, 2014

== Other media ==
=== Little Monk ===
USA Network premiered a 10-episode online series entitled "Little Monk" on August 21, 2009. It includes Adrian and Ambrose Monk during their middle-school years, bringing a back story to Monk's detective skills and phobias.

=== Scrapped television movie ===
On February 17, 2012, Andy Breckman announced that a script had been completed for a television movie titled Mr. Monk For Mayor. Breckman stated that the film should begin production by June–August 2012 in California for a release date in December 2012. Breckman also stated that he hoped a sequel would be produced, as well. The idea was rejected for budgetary reasons.

=== COVID-19 short ===
On May 11, 2020, Peacock, for their At-Home Variety Show released a 4.5-minute scripted short of Monk, titled Mr. Monk Shelters in Place, following Monk during the COVID-19 pandemic, showing how he fares during this time. Tony Shalhoub reprises the title role, as well as original main cast members: Jason Gray-Stanford, Ted Levine, and Traylor Howard as their respective characters.

=== Film ===
On March 14, 2023, Tony Shalhoub confirmed on Dr. Loubna Hassanieh's Unheard Stories: Stories That Inspire podcast that a 90-minute Monk movie was produced for Andy Breckman Productions, Mandeville Television, Universal Content Productions and Peacock, with shooting expected to start in May 2023. The following day, Peacock officially ordered the Monk follow-up film, titled Mr. Monk's Last Case: A Monk Movie with original cast members Shalhoub, Levine, Howard, Gray-Stanford, Hardin and Elizondo (who played Monk, Captain Stottlemeyer, Natalie, Randy, Trudy, and Dr. Bell respectively) confirmed to reprise their roles from the series with creator Andy Breckman writing the script. The movie premiered on December 8, 2023.

=== Soundtrack ===
The show's soundtrack features its original music score, composed by Jeff Beal.

=== Podcast ===
A "behind-the-scenes" audio podcast entitled "Lunch at Monk" was released. In the podcast, cast and crew members of the show are interviewed over lunch and dinner.

=== Novel series ===
Starting in 2006, during the airing of season four, Lee Goldberg, a writer for the series, produced a series of novels based on the original television series. This series continued well after the show they were based on had been cancelled. All of the novels are narrated by Natalie Teeger, Monk's second assistant.

For the most part, the novels remain faithful to the television series, with slight discontinuity. This is because, while Goldberg always adhered to the established continuity of the television series, the television writers ignored the continuity of the novels. Moreover, as stated in the author's notes to Mr. Monk and the Two Assistants and Mr. Monk and the Dirty Cop, due to novels having longer lead times than television episodes, episodes contradicting a novel's events sometimes aired even before the book reached store shelves. On December 31, 2012, the last novel to be written by Lee Goldberg was released. After Goldberg left the series, Hy Conrad wrote four more books, ending with Mr. Monk and the New Lieutenant.

Number	Title	Author	ISBN	Publication date	Notes
1	Mr. Monk Goes to the Firehouse	Lee Goldberg	0-451-21729-2	January 3, 2006	
2	Mr. Monk Goes to Hawaii	Lee Goldberg	0-451-21900-7	July 5, 2006	
3	Mr. Monk and the Blue Flu	Lee Goldberg	0-451-22013-7	January 2, 2007	
4	Mr. Monk and the Two Assistants	Lee Goldberg	0-451-22097-8	July 3, 2007	First appearance of Sharona Fleming in any Monk-related media since 2004, rendered non-canon by the episode "Mr. Monk and Sharona"
5	Mr. Monk in Outer Space	Lee Goldberg	0-451-22098-6	October 30, 2007	
6	Mr. Monk Goes to Germany	Lee Goldberg	0-451-22099-4	July 1, 2008	This novel was written before, but published after, the airing of "Mr. Monk Is on the Run", so events in this story run contrary to the series timeline. The foreword acknowledges some discontinuity.
7	Mr. Monk Is Miserable	Lee Goldberg	0-451-22515-5	December 2, 2008	Direct sequel to Mr. Monk Goes to Germany
8	Mr. Monk and the Dirty Cop	Lee Goldberg	0-451-22698-4	July 7, 2009	
9	Mr. Monk in Trouble	Lee Goldberg	0-451-22905-3	December 1, 2009	Excerpt "The Case of the Piss-Poor Gold" was published in Ellery Queen Mystery Magazine, November 2009
10	Mr. Monk Is Cleaned Out	Lee Goldberg	0-451-23009-4	July 6, 2010	
11	Mr. Monk on the Road	Lee Goldberg	0-451-23211-9	January 4, 2011	Excerpt "Mr. Monk and the Seventeen Steps" was published in Ellery Queen Mystery Magazine, December 2010
12	Mr. Monk on the Couch	Lee Goldberg	0-451-23386-7	June 7, 2011	Excerpt "Mr. Monk and the Sunday Paper" was published in Ellery Queen Mystery Magazine, June/July 2011
13	Mr. Monk on Patrol	Lee Goldberg	0-451-23664-5	January 3, 2012	
14	Mr. Monk Is a Mess	Lee Goldberg	0-451-23687-4	June 5, 2012	Direct sequel to Mr. Monk on Patrol
15	Mr. Monk Gets Even	Lee Goldberg	0-451-23915-6	December 31, 2012	Direct sequel to Mr. Monk Is a Mess
16	Mr. Monk Helps Himself	Hy Conrad	0-451-24093-6	June 4, 2013	
17	Mr. Monk Gets on Board	Hy Conrad	0-451-24095-2	January 7, 2014	Direct sequel to Mr. Monk Helps Himself. The novel itself was noted by Conrad to have been adapted from a never-filmed season-three script for an episode called "Mr. Monk Is At Sea", which would have had Monk and Sharona investigate a murder on a cruise ship. That episode was never filmed because no cruise line, out of sensitivity to the plot, wanted to loan a ship to the production crew to use for shooting.
18	Mr. Monk Is Open for Business	Hy Conrad	0-451-47056-7	June 3, 2014	Direct sequel to Mr. Monk Gets on Board
19	Mr. Monk and the New Lieutenant	Hy Conrad	0-451-47058-3	January 6, 2015	Direct sequel to Mr. Monk Is Open for Business. Hy Conrad confirmed through his website that New Lieutenant will be the final Monk novel.

=== Home releases ===
Universal Pictures Home Entertainment has released all eight seasons of Monk on DVD in Region 1. On October 5, 2010, Universal released Monk – The Complete Series: Limited Edition Box Set on DVD in Region 1, a 32-disc set featuring all eight seasons of the series, as well as special features and a collectible 32-page booklet. Kino Lorber released the entire series and the Mr. Monk's Last Case film in a Region A Blu-ray box set on December 16, 2025.

In Australia, Seasons 1–5 were re-released in slimmer packaging in 2010. In 2017, all eight seasons were re-issued and distributed by Shock Entertainment (previous releases were Universal).

DVD name	Episodes	Release dates		
DVD name	Episodes	Region 1	Region 2	Region 4
Season one	13	June 15, 2004	December 27, 2004	January 18, 2005
Season two	16	January 11, 2005	July 18, 2005	September 21, 2005
Season three	16	June 5, 2005	February 27, 2006	March 22, 2006
Season four	16	June 27, 2006	September 18, 2006	November 15, 2006
Season five	16	June 26, 2007	September 17, 2007	April 1, 2009
Season six	16	July 8, 2008	September 8, 2008	February 3, 2010
Season seven	16	July 21, 2009	August 23, 2010	June 30, 2010
Season eight	16	March 16, 2010	May 9, 2011	December 1, 2010
Season eight	16	November 23, 2010	May 9, 2011	December 1, 2010
Complete series	125	December 14, 2010	August 29, 2011	December 7, 2016
