= Andy Breckman =

American TV and film writer

- Born: Andrew Ross Breckman; March 3, 1955 (age 71); Philadelphia, Pennsylvania, U.S.
- Education: Boston University (dropped out)
- Occupations: Comedian, screenwriter, radio personality, toy developer
- Spouse: Beth Landau
- Children: 5
- Writing career
- Period: 1982–present
- Genres: Detective fiction, comedy
- Notable works: Monk, Rat Race, Seven Second Delay, Sgt. Bilko, I.Q., True Identity, Arthur 2: On the Rocks, The Good Cop
- Website: uncleandytoys.com

Andrew Ross Breckman (born March 3, 1955) is an American screenwriter, comedian, and radio personality. He was the creator, screenwriter, and executive producer of the Emmy Award-winning television series Monk on the USA Network and is co-host of WFMU radio's long-running conceptual comedy program Seven Second Delay. He has written screenplays for a number of comedy films including Sgt. Bilko (starring Steve Martin) and Rat Race (directed by Jerry Zucker).

== Early life ==
Breckman was born in Philadelphia, Pennsylvania, to a middle-class Jewish family. He grew up in Haddonfield, New Jersey, and attended Moorestown Friends School and Haddonfield Memorial High School. In the late 1970s and early 1980s, Breckman performed as a singer-songwriter.

== Television work ==
Breckman wrote for Late Night with David Letterman from 1982 to 1984 and contributed sketches to Saturday Night Live from 1983 to 1996. One of his most well-known vignettes was a Saturday Night Live sketch called "White Like Me" (which he also directed), in which Eddie Murphy disguises himself as a Caucasian for a day. In 2004 he served as a jokewriter for comedian Steve Martin's stint as host of the Academy Awards, for which Breckman was nominated for a Writers Guild of America (WGA) Award for TV writing.

Breckman's biggest success, Monk, was a murder-mystery with a humorous edge. Breckman told New Jersey Monthly that he was a voracious reader of the works of Arthur Conan Doyle, John D. MacDonald, and other authors of “solvable” mysteries, as well as being a big fan of the TV series Columbo. “In a way, it’s similar to comedy writing,” he says. "It's puzzles and puzzle solving. Very logical." In August 2009, USA Network launched the spinoff Little Monk.

He wrote seven episodes of the 2000-2001 Comedy Central series TV Funhouse, and in 2015 wrote "Dog Show" for The Jack and Triumph Show. In July 2016 he was part of a team of writers for Triumph the Insult Comic Dog's coverage of the Republican National Convention in Cleveland and the Democratic National Convention in Philadelphia; the writing crew won the WGA 2017 Award for TV Comedy/Variety.

The Good Cop, another humorous murder-mystery series created and written by Breckman, debuted on Netflix in September 2018. (It ran for ten episodes before being cancelled.) The show starred Tony Danza as Tony Caruso Sr., "a disgraced, former NYPD officer who never followed the rules," and Josh Groban as his son, Tony "T.J." Caruso Jr., a squeaky-clean homicide detective. About the series, Breckman said, "Many cop shows feature dark and provocative material: psycho-sexual killers, twisted, grim, flawed detectives. Many address the most controversial issues of the day. I watch a lot of them. God bless 'em all. But the show I want to produce is playful, family-friendly, and a celebration of old-fashioned puzzle-solving."

In October 2018, TBS announced it would be launching a new TV series, The Misery Index, starring members of the Tenderloins comedy troupe, based on Breckman's card game, "Shit Happens". Breckman developed the TV version with Ben and Dan Newmark of Grandma's House Entertainment. The series premiered on October 22, 2019. On December 3, 2019, it was announced the series was renewed for a second season. In 2021 it completed its third season.

Breckman wrote the screenplay for the feature-length film, Mr. Monk's Last Case: A Monk Movie, which aired on the Peacock Network in December 2023. The film reunited most of the cast of the original series.

In 2025, CBS ordered a series for a new crime drama by Breckman titled Einstein. The show, about Albert Einstein's fictitious great-grandson, Lewis Einstein, is adapted from 2017 German series and 2015 film of the same name. The pilot was directed by Randy Zisk, who previously teamed with Breckman on Monk. Tony Shalhoub, who played the title character in Monk, has a recurring role as Jack Einstein, Lewis Einstein’s father. The show is slated to debut on February 12, 2027.

A Hindi-language series, Mistry, based on Monk, debuted in 2025.

== Personal life ==
Breckman lives in Madison, New Jersey with his wife, documentary filmmaker Beth Landau, whom he met on the dating pages of Nerve.com and who is nicknamed "Boo." They have two children. In 2011, Breckman and Landau were a featured couple in the documentary When Strangers Click, a film about internet dating. As an engagement present, Breckman named a murder victim after his fiancée (spelled "Beth Landow") in Monk's season two (2003) episode, "Mr. Monk Goes Back to School".

== Radio ==
Since 1992, Breckman and WFMU station manager Ken Freedman have co-hosted a weekly one-hour comedy radio program, Seven Second Delay. The premise of the program seems to be a never-ending series of dead-on-arrival concepts, with the comedic value hinging on Breckman's recurring acknowledgment of failure and his desire to go home as quickly as possible. Breckman has described his co-host as "a sad, bitter little man and WFMU's fundraisers are a good time to humiliate him and exploit his willingness to do just about anything, including prostituting himself, to raise money for his adorable little public hippy noise radio station."

From 2009 to 2012, Seven Second Delay broadcast remotely from the Upright Citizens Brigade Theater comedy club in Manhattan. In 2011 the UCB shows went bi-weekly. Guests on the program included Dick Cavett, Joe Franklin, Amy Sedaris, Peter Stampfel, Jules Feiffer, Andrew VanWyngarden (of the band MGMT), Dan Okrent, Nora Ephron, Wallace Shawn, Jim Downey, and numerous other celebrities.

In 1998, Gadfly Records released Death-Defying Radio Stunts, a CD of outrageous moments from Seven Second Delay studio broadcasts.

== Other projects ==
In 2014 he launched a line of unusual toys under the brand name Uncle Andy Toys. Products which have reached the consumer market include Real Life Travel Bingo, Who Tooted?, and Rigged Trivia. In 2015 he launched "Feed a Puppy," a live-streaming interactive animal app featuring real rescue puppies, in which users purchase treats to feed the puppies, with a portion of sales receipts donated to rescue shelters. In 2016, he funded his new card game, Shit Happens, with a successful Kickstarter campaign.

Breckman achieved notoriety for his vigilante campaign against the scourge of porch piracy, as announced on Seven Second Delay on the October 21, 2026 program.

== Feud with Don McLean ==
Early in his singing career, Breckman was given the opportunity to perform as opening act for "American Pie" singer Don McLean, with whom he shared management. The two did not get along, and a feud developed that has persisted to the present day. Andy Breckman wrote about the feud and Don McLean responded to Breckman's claims on WFMU's website.

== Filmography ==
=== Films ===
- Moving (1988)
- Arthur 2: On the Rocks (1988)
- Hot to Trot (1988)
- True Identity (1991)
- I.Q. (1994)
- Sgt. Bilko (1996)
- Rat Race (2001)
- Mr. Monk's Last Case: A Monk Movie (2023)

=== TV and video ===
- Hot Hero Sandwich (1979)
- Late Night with David Letterman (1982)
- Saturday Night Live (1983–1996)
- Tourist Trap (1998)
- TV Funhouse (2000)
- Monk (2002–2009)
- The 75th Annual Academy Awards (2003)
- The Good Cop (2018)
- The Misery Index (2019)
- Mistry (2025)
- Einstein (upcoming; 2027)

== Discography ==
- Don't Get Killed (Gadfly Records, 1990)
- Proud Dad (Gadfly Records, 1994)
- Death-Defying Radio Stunts (Gadfly Records, 1998)
