= Karron Graves =

American actress, teacher (active 1987– )

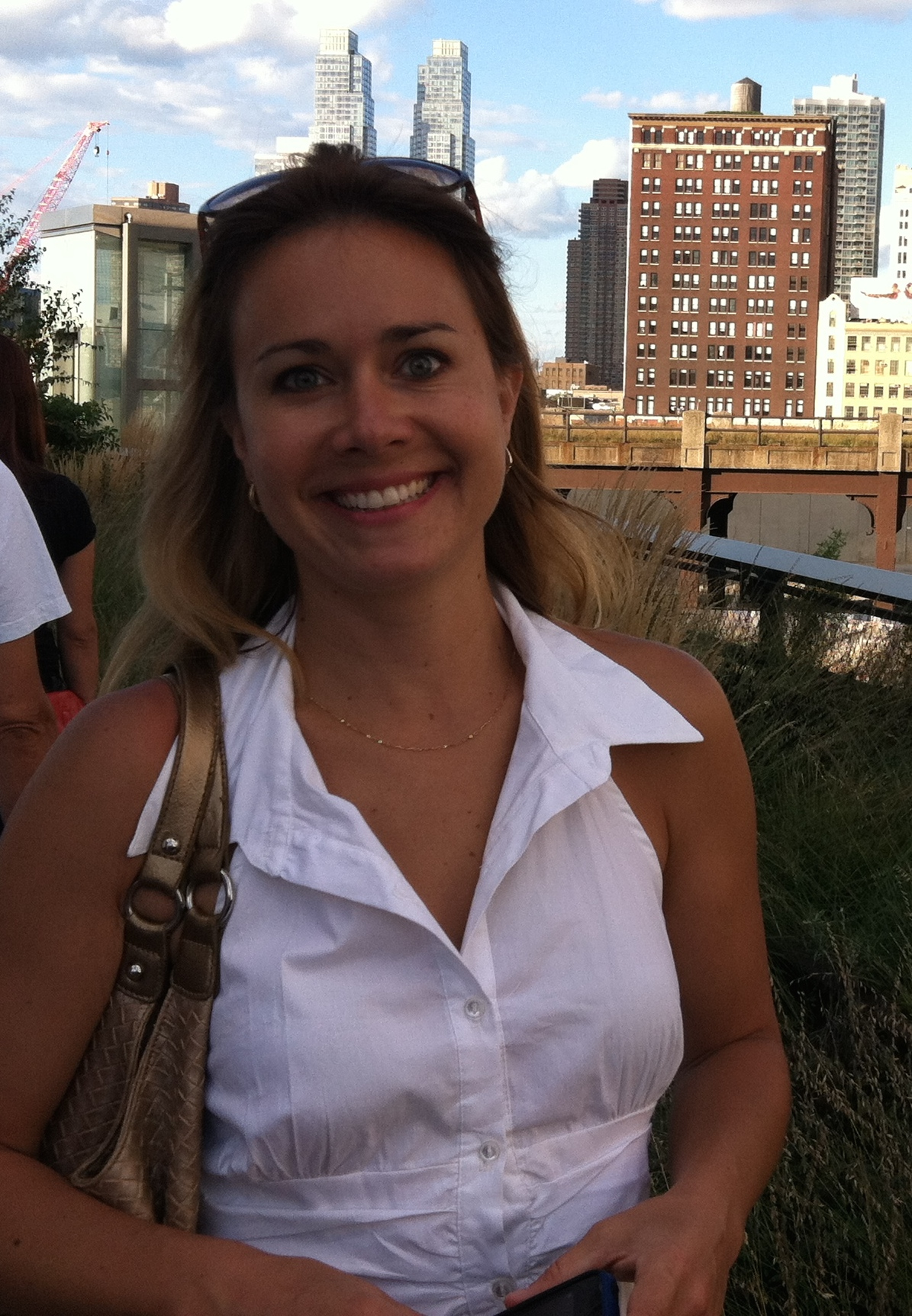
- Karron Graves on the High Line in Manhattan (2015)
- Born: November 30, 1973 (age 52); Janesville, Wisconsin
- Occupations: Actress; Teacher
- Years active: 1987-present
- Known for: Playing Mary Warren in the film The Crucible

Karron Graves is an American actress and teacher. She may be best known for playing Mary Warren in the 1996 screen adaptation of Arthur Miller’s The Crucible, starring Daniel Day-Lewis.

== Personal life and education ==
Graves was born on November 30, 1973, in Janesville, Wisconsin, and spent her childhood in both Sarasota, Florida, and New York City. As a young child, Karron was a competitive swimmer and a 2-time Junior Olympics competitor. She received her Bachelor of Arts from Princeton University and her Master of Fine Arts from the Yale School of Drama.

She lives in New York with her husband, Rolando Briceno, a teacher and school administrator; as of 2015 they had two children, daughter Jackie Jo and son Jude.

== Childhood career ==
On stage, she originated the role of Clara in the 1987 world premiere of Arthur Miller’s Danger:Memory! at Lincoln Center Theater, directed by Gregory Mosher. Other early stage roles included Ginya in Leslie Ayvazian’s Nine Armenians at Manhattan Theatre Club.

She made her television debut on Saturday Night Live in 1986 as Lisa Meyers, a Girl Scout opposite Phil Hartman's Ronald Reagan in a season 12 (1986-1987 season) sketch from the episode hosted by Steve Martin, Chevy Chase, and Martin Short that shows that Ronald Reagan is a political mastermind when the press isn't around. In 1987, she played the lead role of orphan girl Miranda, in the PBS television movie The Fig Tree, and appeared in the main cast of the short lived 1989 series Dolphin Cove, as Katie Larson, the teenage daughter of the character played by series lead Frank Converse.

== Stage, Film, and Television Roles ==
Graves may be best known for playing Mary Warren, a girl accused of witchcraft during the Salem witch trials, as shown in the 1996 film The Crucible, starring Daniel Day-Lewis and Winona Ryder; a review in People cited Graves for her "quietly moving performance". Other television appearances include episodes of NBC’s Law & Order, CBS’s Guiding Light, USA’s Monk, and Hulu's The Path, while film appearances include The Good Shepherd, the video short 5 Wishes, Late Phases, and Minor Premise (Film). Graves' stage credits include Broadway, Off-Broadway, and Regional Theatre productions. While at Yale, she originated the roles of Dora Hand in Roberto Aguirre-Sacasa’s The Muckle Man, Lizzie Booth in Trip Cullman’s Absolutely True, Sara in A. Rey Pamatmat’s Deviant, and Blanche Verse in Marcus Gardley’s ...And Jesus Moonwalks the Mississippi She received paid training with the SITI Company to star in the 2005 world premiere of Intimations for Saxophone, directed by Anne Bogart at Arena Stage, and she starred opposite James Whitmore in both 2006's Trying at Ford’s Theatre and the 70th Anniversary Celebration of Our Town in 2008. Graves also played Isobel Ashbrook on Broadway in Helen Edmundson's 2007 Tony Award-nominated Coram Boy, directed by Melly Still, and in 2012 starred Off-Broadway in The Philanderer at the New York City Center with the Pearl Theatre. In 2013 she appeared in the NYTimes Critics’ Pick Two Point Oh at 59E59.

In 2015, Graves won the New Hampshire Theater Award for Best Actress for her portrayal of Alice Maitland in The Peterborough Players' production of The Voysey Inheritance.

For the 2015-2016 season at the Roundabout Theatre Company, Karron played Mamie Gummer’s sister in the world premiere of Lindsey Ferrentino’s Ugly Lies the Bone, directed by Patricia McGregor. Graves joined the cast of Amy and the Orphans, during its Off-Broadway run in the Spring of 2018.

== Teacher ==
As of 2024, Graves teaches acting at the New York University Tisch School of the Arts and the American Musical and Dramatic Academy.
