= Gildart Jackson =

English actor, writer, and audiobook narrator

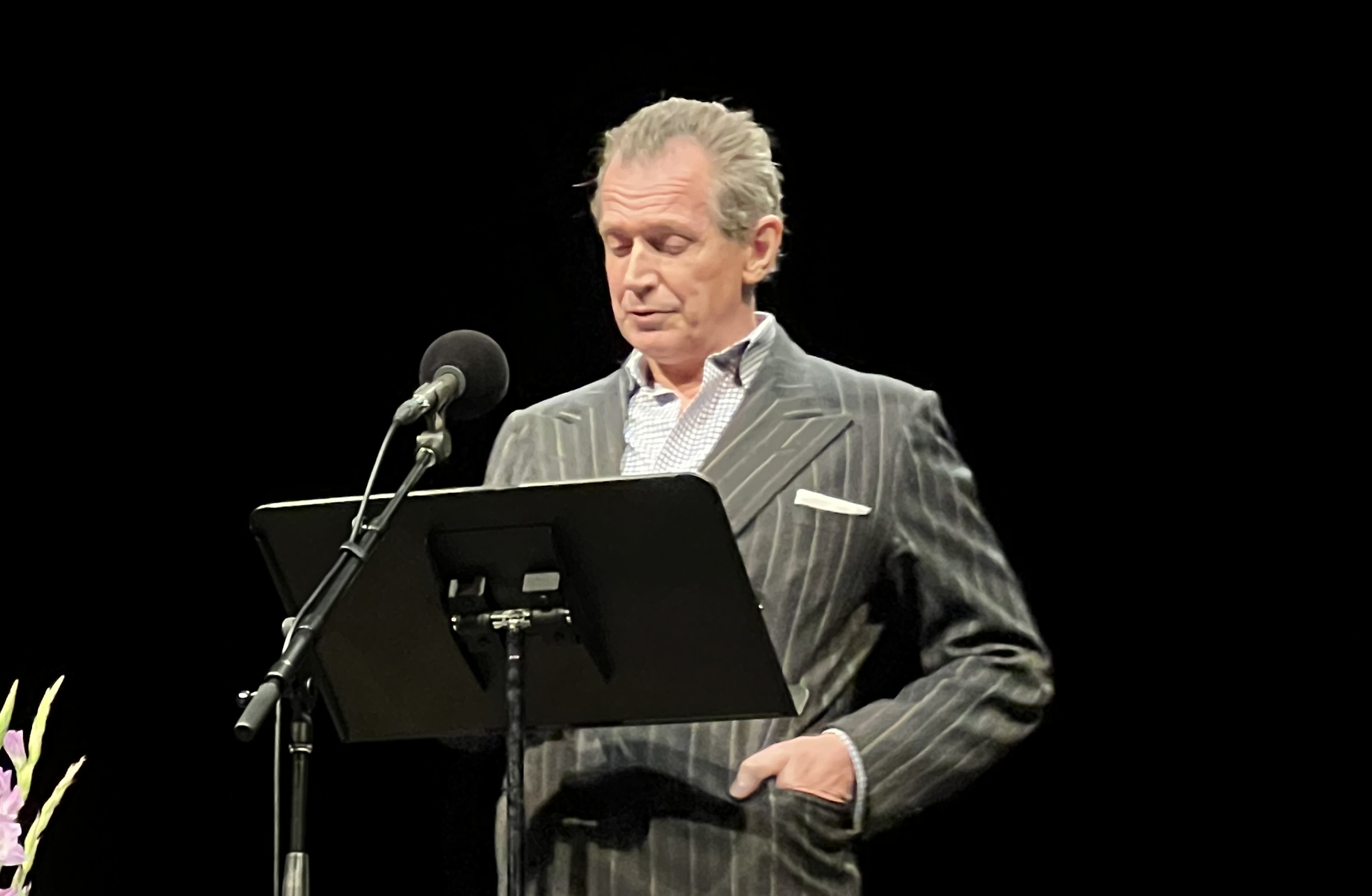
- Jackson in 2024
- Born: July 13, 1963 (age 63); London, England, UK
- Occupations: Actor, writer, audiobook narrator
- Years active: 1995–present
- Spouse: Melora Hardin (m. 1997)
- Children: 2
- Relatives: Jerry Hardin (father-in-law)

Gildart Jackson is an English actor and writer. He is best known for portraying Gideon in Charmed and Giles the butler in the 2013 reality television series Whodunnit?.

== Career ==
He played an Elder and Headmaster of Magic School named Gideon in the TV series Charmed. His character is known for his double crossing of the Charmed Ones by trying to kill Piper Halliwell's child Wyatt because of his powers.

Jackson appeared in the soap operas The Young and the Restless and General Hospital.

In 2013, he made a guest appearance in a season 9 episode of Supernatural.

In 2015, Jackson participated in a stage production of Charles Evered's Class at the Falcon Theatre in Burbank, California.

In 2016, Jackson participated in a stage production of a redux version of William Shakespeare's The Tempest in the Odyssey Theatre in Los Angeles.

== Personal life ==
Jackson has been married to Melora Hardin since 1997. They have two daughters.

== Filmography ==
=== Film ===
Year	Title	Role	Notes
1999	The Big Brass Ring	Thad Cottrell IV	
2002	Hot Rush	Alex	Short film
2003	Easy	Paul	
2004	Leave No Trace	Jess Dean	
2009	You	Rawdon	Writer/producer
2009	The Tub		Short film
2010	Asleep with the Angels	Manfred	Short film
2011	This Is Not an Umbrella	Benjamin Vrijenboch	Short film
2011	Red-Handed		Short film
2012	Zombie Hamlet	Professor Reginald Wellington III	
2012	Atlas Shrugged: Part II	Gilbert Keith-Worthing	
2012	A Helping Hand	Roy	Short film
2013	Monstrum	Librarian	Short film
2015	Deadly Pursuit	Victor	
2015	Hershel and the Hanukkah Goblins		Short film
2017	Gobi: A Little Dog with a Big Heart	Narrator	Short film

=== Television ===
Year	Title	Role	Notes
1995	Street Sharks	–	Series 3, Episode 4: "First Shark"; writer
1995–1996	Action Man	–	4 episodes; writer
1995	Larsens of Las Vegas		Television film
1997	Extreme Dinosaurs	–	3 episodes; writer
1999–2001	General Hospital	Simon Prentiss	
2000	V.I.P.	Auctioneer	Series 2, Episode 11: "Dangerous Beauty"
2000	Early Edition	Man in the Hat / Examinator	Series 4, Episode 14: "Performance Anxiety"
2001	Cover Me	Dr. Harold Bentley	Series 1, Episode 19: "Borderline Normal"
2001	When Billie Beat Bobby	English Bobby	Television film
2001	Sherlock Holmes in the 22nd Century		Series 2, Episode 8: "The Adventure of the Mazarin Chip"; writer
2001–2002	Hellsing	Chris Pickman	2 episodes; voice
2002	Judging Amy		Series 3, Episode 22: "Boston Terriers from France"
2002	Providence	Jackson Palmer	5 episodes
2002	Boomtown	Ivan Vronski	Series 1, Episode 2: "Possession"
2002	The Big Time	Clive	Television film
2002	John Doe	Inspector Tate Garrison	Series 1, Episode 9: "Manifest Destiny"
2003	Las Vegas	King Arthur / Arden King	Series 1, Episode 2: "What Happens in Vegas Stays in Vegas"
2003	CSI: Crime Scene Investigation	Oliver Micelli	Series 4, Episode 8: "After the Show"
2004	Charmed	Gideon	7 episodes
2004	Stargate: Atlantis	Janus	Series 1, Episode 14: "Before I Sleep"
2005	Untold Stories of the E.R.		Series 1, Episode 10: "Call the Code"; writer
2005	Franklin Charter	Piston	Television film
2006–2011	Hellsing Ultimate	The Major / Various characters	Voice
2009	The Suite Life on Deck	James Smith	Series 2, Episode 1: "The Spy Who Shoved Me"
2010	Hannah Montana	Quinn	Series 4, Episode 8: "Hannah's Gonna Get This"
2013	Whodunnit?	Giles the Butler	
2013	Burn Notice	Barton	Series 7, Episode 8: "Nature of the Beast"
2013	Supernatural	James Haggerty	Series 9, Episode 4: "Slumber Party"
2014	The Young and the Restless	Dr. Jorgensen	3 episodes
2017	Feud	Maitre d'	Series 1, Episode 4: "More, or Less"
2017–2021	The Bold Type	Ian Carlyle	12 episodes
2018	Home Invaders	Professor Marcus	Television film
2020–2021	Castlevania	FlysEyes	2 episodes; voice

=== Video games ===
Year	Title	Role	Notes
2011	Star Wars: The Old Republic	Servant One	Voice Role
2014	Star Wars: The Old Republic – Shadow of Revan	Additional Voices	
2019	Star Wars: The Old Republic – Onslaught	Additional Voices	
2022	Gotham Knights	Alfred Pennyworth	Voice Role
