= Dolphin Cove (TV series) =

American drama television series

- Title card from original run.
- Genre: Drama
- Created by: Allan Marcil
- Written by: Peter Benchley
- Directed by: Mel Damski; Noel Black; Brian Henson
- Starring: Trey Ames; Frank Converse; Ernie Dingo; Karron Graves; Virginia Hey; Antony Richards; Nick Tate
- Composer: Bill Conti
- Countries of origin: United States; Australia
- Original language: English
- No. of seasons: 1
- No. of episodes: 8

Production
- Executive producers: Allan Marcil; John Masius
- Producer: Kevin Slattery
- Production locations: Hollywood Center Studios, Hollywood, California; Disney-MGM Studios, Orlando, Florida; Sea World Gold Coast, Queensland, Australia
- Camera setup: Panavision
- Running time: 60 minutes
- Production companies: Dick Berg/Stonehenge Productions; Paramount Television

Original release
- Network: CBS
- Release: January 21 – March 11, 1989

Dolphin Cove is an American-Australian drama television series created by Allan Marcil, set in Sea World, Gold Coast, Queensland, Australia that aired on CBS from January 21 to March 11, 1989, for eight episodes.

== Synopsis ==
The show centers on widowed researcher Michael Larson and his two teenage children: daughter Katie, and her elder brother David. The Larsons move to Australia, after Michael is hired by wealthy industrialist Baron Trent to help perfect man-to-dolphin communications. To this end, Michael begins working with two dolphins named Slim and Delbert.

Michael's wife died in an automobile accident roughly a year ago. David does his best to fit in with the Aussie lifestyle, and at his new school, but finds it tricky. Katie, who was in the car with her mother during the fatal crash, was not injured physically but has been an elective mute (capable of speaking but refusing) ever since. Initially, Katie distrusts her new therapist, Alison Mitchell. Although Katie is not comfortable around most people, she promptly hits it off with Slim and Delbert. Moreover, Katie soon discovers that she has an almost telegraphic means of communicating with both dolphins; thus she succeeds where her father and Trent have failed.

Also working for Trent is Didge, an Aboriginal Australian. Didge acts as Michael's assistant, besides being a mentor and (when called for) bodyguard to David and Katie.

Kevin Mitchell, Alison's son, is one of David's classmates and frequently coaches David through life at their school.

The series, filmed on location at Seaworld on Australia's Gold Coast, was co-created by Peter Benchley.

== Cast ==
- Frank Converse as Michael Larson
- Trey Ames as David Larson
- Karron Graves as Katie Larson
- Ernie Dingo as Didge
- Virginia Hey as Alison Mitchell
- Antony Richards as Kevin Mitchell
- Nick Tate as Baron Trent
- Noah Taylor as Convict
- Penne Hackforth-Jones
- Richard Moir

== Episodes ==
No.	Title	Directed by	Written by	Original release date	U.S. viewers (millions)
1	"Pilot"	Mel Damski	Peter Benchley	January 21, 1989	17.1
Seeking to start a new life after the death of his wife dolphin researcher Michael Larson moves to Australia with his two children, and is hired by Baron Trent to figure out dolphin communication. His son, David, hates the family's new life, and daughter, Katie, who hasn't spoken since her mother's death, is wary of her new therapist, Allison, but bonds with dolphins Slim and Delbert.
2	"Two Shots and a Splash"	Noel Black	John Masius & Ann Reckling	January 28, 1989	14.4
Michael is visited by an old college friend, whose environmental protection efforts have grown more radical.
3	"Reading, Writing and Telepathy"	Mel Damski	Story by : John Masius & Ann Reckling; Teleplay by : Judith Kahan	February 4, 1989	15.7
Delbert's mysterious ailment makes Katie anxious at school, and David looks for work. Allison's ex-husband pays a visit for son Kevin's birthday.
4	"The Initiation of Lisa Ruddick"	Noel Black	Everett De Roche	February 11, 1989	14.1
Slim and Delbert are upset by a reporter, who is planting suspicion about Trent's true interests.
5	"The Ship That Sank Twice"	Marcus Cole	Everett De Roche	February 18, 1989	14.0
While Michael is away Trent's personal project disturbs Slim and Delbert. Didge's loyalties to his family and his work come into conflict.
6	"Fighting Back"	Geoffrey Nottage	Story by : Margaret Kelly; Teleplay by : Margaret Kelly & John Masius & Ann Reckling	February 25, 1989	13.2
Katie gets an admirer and David faces adversity. Didge's family believes that Trent's estate is on sacred land.
7	"Stormy Weather"	Brendan Maher	Carla Kettner	March 4, 1989	12.2
The estate is on generator power due to an approaching monsoon, and Didge welcomes two men claiming to be stranded fishermen, but who are actually escaped convicts.
8	"The Elders"	Geoffrey Nottage	John Masius & Ann Reckling	March 11, 1989	11.0
Michael's in-laws visit and want to take David and Katie back with them to the United States. Didge's grandfather begins a death ritual. Guest star: Teresa Wright received an Emmy nomination for her role as Michael's mother-in-law.
