= Thunder (TV series) =

- Starring: Melora Hardin
- Country of origin: United States
- No. of episodes: 13

Production
- Running time: 22? minutes
- Production companies: Marcum Productions; Charles Fries Productions

Original release
- Network: NBC
- Release: September 10, 1977 – September 2, 1978

Thunder is a 1977–1978 American children's show which aired on Saturday mornings on NBC. The show centered on the adventures of Cindy Prescott (Melora Hardin) and her friend, Willie Williams (Justin Randi) and featured Thunder, a black stallion who ran wild near the ranch owned by the Prescott family. The cast also featured Cindy's parents – Bill (Clint Ritchie), a rancher, and Anne (Melissa Converse), a veterinarian.

Thunder was always there to rescue Cindy and/or Willie in times of trouble "caused by others' misdeeds and thoughtlessness," including a forest fire caused by a practical joker, and Willie being hit by a stray bullet fired by teens in a no-shooting area. Also playing a part in the adventures was Willie’s stubborn mule, Cupcake, who was trained to "burp" on camera.

For about a month, in an effort to improve ratings, the producers of Thunder re-titled the show “Super Horse, Starring Thunder.”

Thunder was created by the creators of Fury, another show featuring a stallion. This show also aired on NBC, from 1955 to 1960.

Thunder was part of a 90-minute block of three live action shows to debut on NBC during the 1977 season, along with Search and Rescue: the Alpha Team and The Red Hand Gang. It was the only one of the three to run for a full season in the United States, with all episodes aired. (Search and Rescue: the Alpha Team was shown in prime time in Canada, where it was filmed and simply titled Search and Rescue, and stayed on the air for a full season.)

Concerning international broadcasting, it is best known that in Italy the show ran in syndication in the early 80's under the title Fulmine (Italian for lightning).

== Cast ==
- Melora Hardin as Cindy Prescott
- Justin Randi as Willie Williams
- Clint Ritchie as Bill
- Melissa Converse as Anne
