= Jonathan Hall Kovacs =

American actor

- Born: Jonathan Hall Kovacs; October 20, 1969 (age 56); Alameda County (CA), U.S.A.

Jonathan Hall Kovacs (also known as Johnny Kovacs or Jon K, born October 20, 1969, in Alameda County, California) is an American former child actor and director. Nowadays, he is an entertainer.

== Biography ==
=== Acting ===
Jonathan Kovacs appeared as a semi-regular character during the ninth season of Little House on the Prairie and as a regular character on the 1983 series The Family Tree. He was nominated for a Young Artist Award in 1984 as the Best Young Actor in a Drama Series for The Family Tree. He also made several appearances in other popular television works of that time period, in which all of the characters he played were deaf people.

=== Adult life and career ===
In 1988, he graduated with honours from California School for the Deaf in Fremont, California. He returned there after a couple of years away from school. He did several plays and ITV, a course in learning how to film and edit.

As an adult, he has directed a few short stage performances. His interest in ASL performances gave birth to Rathskellar (performing arts) in 1998 to showcase the raw beauty of sign language by combining it with visual arts and pulsating music. It turned out to astonish crowds and quickly became internationally known for thrilling levels of originality and intensity, which were rarely seen in ASL productions at the time.

== Personal life ==
Kovacs is Deaf.

== Filmography ==
Year	Title	Role	Notes
2001	Gideon's Crossing	John	2000-2001 television series, episodes 13-15
1985	Airwolf	Raf	1984-1986 television series, episode 3.09 "Jennie"
1983	The Family Tree	Toby Benjamin	1983 television series
1982-1983	Little House on the Prairie	Matthew Rogers	1974-1984 television series, 5 episodes
1982	The Six of Us	Toby Benjamin	television movie
