= The Six of Us =

- Genre: Drama
- Written by: Carol Evan McKeand
- Directed by: Edward Parone
- Starring: Gail Strickland; Marco St. John
- Music by: Mark Snow
- Country of origin: United States
- Original language: English

Production
- Executive producers: Deanne Barkley; Nigel McKeand
- Cinematography: Howard Schwartz
- Production company: NBC Productions

Original release
- Network: NBC
- Release: June 13, 1982

The Six of Us is a 1982 television film directed by Edward Parone and starring Gail Strickland and Marco St. John. It eventually served as a pilot film for the short-lived television series The Family Tree. The 1983 series was recast (except for the deaf actor Jonathan Hall Kovacs), and some characters' names were changed.

== Premise ==
It centers on a group of six individuals brought together to live, work, or navigate a shared experience, with the format focusing on their interpersonal dynamics, conflicts, and relationships.

As with many ensemble-based reality or drama formats, the core idea is to explore how different personalities interact in a confined or structured setting. The narrative typically develops through alliances, disagreements, personal backstories, and evolving group dynamics, offering insight into both individual behavior and group psychology.

The appeal of the show lies in its character-driven storytelling, where the tension and development come less from external plot devices and more from how the six participants influence one another over time.

== Cast ==
- Gail Strickland as Sally Benjamin-Tree
- Marco St. John as Kevin Tree
- Susan Swift as Tessa Benjamin
- Lee Montgomery as Sam Benjamin
- Jonathan Hall Kovacs as Toby Benjamin
- Patrick Cassidy as Jake Tree
- Phillip R. Allen as Robert Benjamin
