= Marco St. John =

American actor

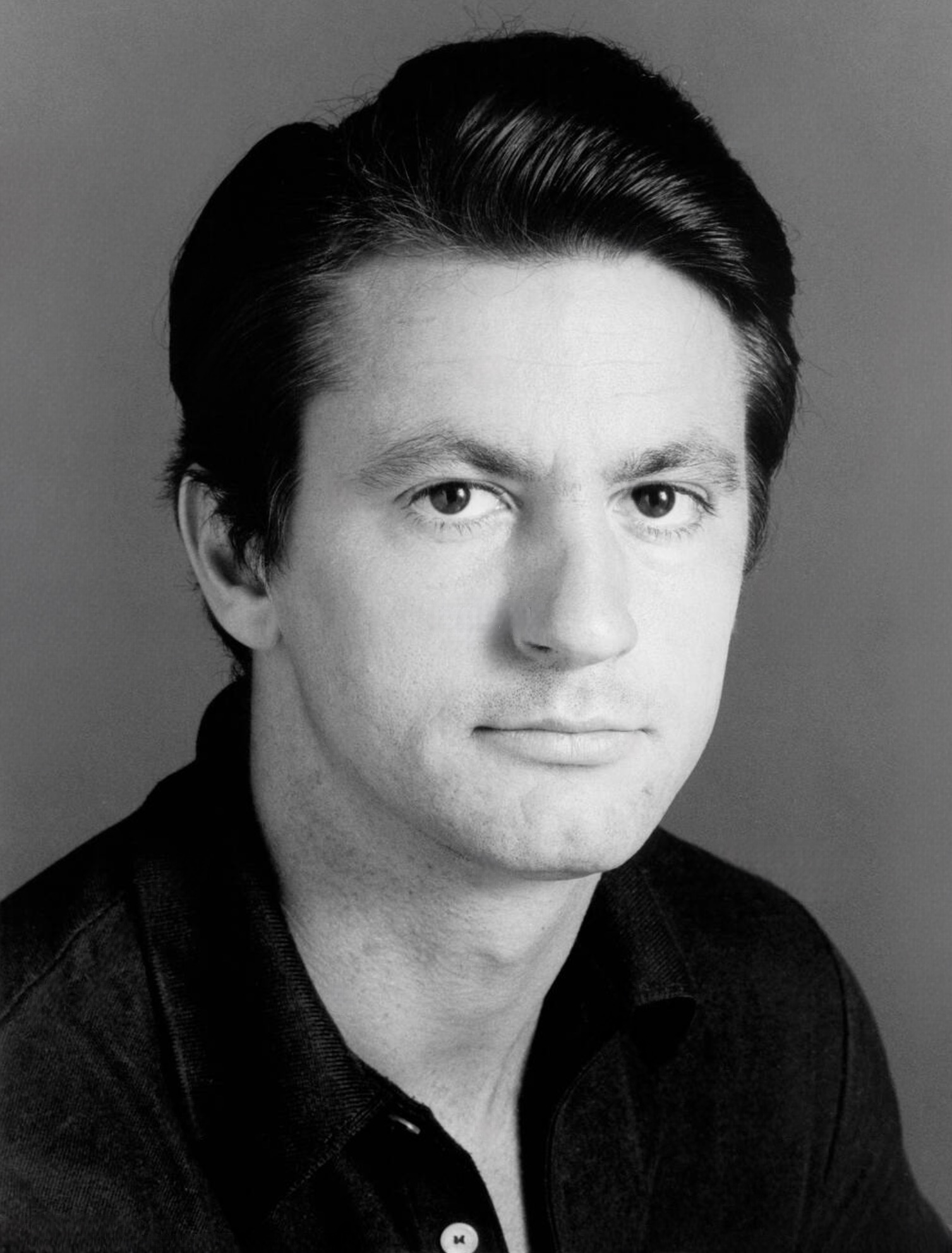
- John in Ball Four, 1976
- Born: Marco John Figueroa Jr. May 7, 1939 (age 87); New Orleans, Louisiana, U.S.
- Occupation: Actor
- Years active: 1951−present

Marco St. John (born Marco John Figueroa Jr.; May 7, 1939) is an American actor who has appeared in films and television programs. He is known for his role as the lascivious and obnoxious truck driver in the 1991 film Thelma & Louise and for playing Sheriff Cal Tucker in the 1985 horror film Friday the 13th: A New Beginning. He has also worked as a theater producer and cultural organizer on the Mississippi Gulf Coast.

== Early life ==
Marco St. John was born in New Orleans, Louisiana, the son of Iris (née Davidson) and Marco Juan Figueroa Sr., and spent part of his childhood connected to Ocean Springs, Mississippi, where his family maintained long-standing roots. He visited the Mississippi Gulf Coast as a child and later attended Ocean Springs High School and Gulfport High School. His family had deep involvement in local historical and cultural activities, including participation in historical pageants and reenactments connected to the 1699 French landing at Fort Maurepas in Ocean Springs.

He later studied at Fordham University in New York City, where he initially considered pursuing a law degree before turning to acting. After college, he trained in classical theater, including Shakespearean performance, at the Royal Academy of Dramatic Art in London. He subsequently returned to New York to pursue a professional acting career on stage.

== Career ==
St. John appeared in multiple Broadway productions and performed opposite Julie Harris in the Broadway play Forty Carats. He later played Hamlet at the San Diego Shakespeare Festival and appeared in more than 11 Broadway productions over the course of his career.

On television, he appeared on the soap opera As the World Turns, portraying Dr. Paul Stewart, and later had recurring and guest roles on series including In the Heat of the Night, Walker, Texas Ranger, Homicide, Major Dad, The Equalizer, and Mike Hammer.

St. John appeared in a number of feature films, including Thelma & Louise, Tightrope, Hard Target, The Package, and State of Grace. His role as the truck driver in Thelma & Louise became one of his most widely recognized performances, and newspapers noted that the notoriety of the role contrasted with his off-screen personality.

He founded the Mississippi Repertory Theater Company, which operated from 1979 to 1982 and brought professional actors and directors to the Mississippi Gulf Coast. After a hiatus of approximately 20 years, he announced plans to revive the company, citing increased cultural and financial readiness in South Mississippi. The revival was scheduled to begin with a production of The Lion in Winter at the Saenger Theatre in New Orleans under the direction of Richard Harden.

In 1980, St. John starred in The Gospel of St. Mark, a one-man stage production adapted from a Broadway presentation originally performed by Alec McCowen. The production was staged in Mississippi and noted for its demanding memorization and performance requirements.

He stated that professional theater in the community had a responsibility not only to entertain but also to educate and address social issues, and he expressed the view that the Mississippi Gulf Coast had the potential for national recognition in theater.

St. John portrayed Pierre Le Moyne d'Iberville in the annual reenactment of the 1699 French landing at Fort Maurepas in Ocean Springs. His participation reflected his family's long-standing involvement in local historical preservation and reenactment activities.

By the 1990s and early 2000s, St. John resided primarily in Ocean Springs, Mississippi, while continuing to work in film and television productions in Louisiana and elsewhere. During this period, he designed and helped construct a modern home in Ocean Springs and expressed interest in undertaking additional homebuilding projects between acting jobs.

== Filmography ==
=== Film ===
Year	Title	Role	Notes
1966	The Plastic Dome of Norma Jean	Bobo	
1972	The Mind Snatchers	Lawrence Shannon	
1976	The Next Man	Justin	
1978	Superman	Mugger's Arm in Alley	Uncredited
1980	Night of the Juggler	Hampton Richmond Clayton III	
1982	Cat People	Policeman	
1984	Tightrope	Leander Rolfe	
1985	Friday the 13th: A New Beginning	Sheriff Cal Tucker	
1989	The Package	Marth	
1990	State of Grace	Cavello	
1991	Thelma & Louise	Truck Driver	Uncredited
1993	Hard Target	Dr. Morton	
1995	The Dangerous	Polk	
1997	The Truth About Juliet	Jack Green	
2001	The Rising Place	Defense Attorney	
2001	The Waking	Deputy Wilkes	
2002	The Badge	Big Six Rayburn	
2003	Tough Luck	Charlie	
2003	Undermind	Mr. Laurie	
2003	Runaway Jury	Daley	
2003	Monster	Evan / Undercover "John"	
2003	Vicious	Col. Hardwick	
2004	The Punisher	Police Chief Morris	
2004	Mr. 3000	Reporter	
2005	At Last	Frank Singleton	
2006	Things That Hang from Trees	Sheriff Hank Bullard	
2006	Beyond the Wall of Sleep	Dr. Fenton	
2006	In	Cimanno	
2007	Flakes	Tre Zeringue	
2008	New Orleans, Mon Amour	Sinclar	
2008	My Mom's New Boyfriend	Inspector Laborde	
2008	The Loss of a Teardrop Diamond	Mr. Willow	
2008	Private Valentine: Blonde & Dangerous	Morris Grey Esq.	
2009	Bad Lieutenant: Port of Call New Orleans	Eugene Gratz	
2010	Leonie	Routolo	
2010	Dylan Dog: Dead of Night	Borelli	
2011	Rites of Spring	The Stranger	
2012	The Philly Kid	Doctor	
2012	The Campaign	Husband	Uncredited
2013	Shadow People	Professor Norman Fisher	
2013	The Butler	Warren E. Burger	Uncredited
2014	Barefoot	Mr. Vincent	
2015	Zipper	John Tamlin	
2015	Parallels	Promoter	
2015	Sweet Kandy	Warden Lester Cribbs	
2015	Return to Sender	Older Man	
2015	Fantastic Four	DC Military Official (Area 57)	
2015	Relentless Justice	Ingrassia	
2016	Partners	Captain Jack MacDonald	
2016	Indiscretion	Governor Wallace	
2017	Mississippi Murder	Det. Eddie	
2017	Novitiate	Father Luca	
2018	Urban Country	Judge Jacobs	

=== Television ===
Year	Title	Role	Notes
1962	Naked City	Dom Capado	Episode: "Daughter Am I in My Father's House"
1963	Route 66	Johnnie Simmons	Episode: "Soda Pop and Paper Flags"
1967	Coronet Blue	Ted	Episode: "A Time to Be Born"
1970	As the World Turns	Dr. Paul Stewart	Episode dated February 27, 1970
1972	Bonanza	Plank	Episode: "Riot"
1972–1974	Gunsmoke	Darcy / Virgil Bonner	2 episodes
1973	Bridget Loves Bernie	Roger Melton	Episode: "Greener Pastures"
1976	Kojak	Tony Papas	Episode: "Birthday Party"
1976	Ball Four	Rayford Plunkett / Raymond Plunkett	6 episodes
1977	Contract on Cherry Street	Eddie Manzaro	Television film
1977	Ryan's Hope	Police Officer	Episode #1.631
1980	Beulah Land	Blaylock	Episode: "Part III"
1981	American Playhouse	Banfield	Episode: "Until She Talks"
1982	The Six of Us	Kevin Tree	Television film
1983	Dixie: Changing Habits	Emcee	Television film
1984	Remington Steele	Doc Gridley	Episode: "Second Base Steele"
1987	The New Mike Hammer	Milo's Henchman	Episode: "A Face in the Night"
1987	The Equalizer	Victor Thorpe	Episode: "First Light"
1988–1990	In the Heat of the Night	Jay Turkus / Joe Ed Thaxton	2 episodes
1989	Kojak: Fatal Flaw	Payton	Television film
1990	Blue Bayou	Morley Rickerts	Television film
1991	This Gun for Hire	Tom Scott	Television film
1991	Major Dad	Barney Flatt	Episode: "Major Moonlighting"
1994–1996	Walker, Texas Ranger	Evan Calder / Officer Strangis	2 episodes
1995	Pointman	Martin Hirsch	Episode: "Judgement Day"
1996	The Big Easy	Elliott Booker	Episode: "The Gambler"
1999	Homicide: Life on the Street	Bus Driver McCusker	Episode: "Shades of Gray"
2000	Sacrifice	Dr. Hector Salcodo	Television film
2004	Frankenfish	Chief	Television film
2004	The Brooke Ellison Story	Literature Professor	Television film
2005	Snow Wonder	Judge Tilma	Television film
2007	Girl, Positive	Parent	Television film
2010	Memphis Beat	Mayor Brian Talmadge	Episode: "I Shall Not Be Moved"
2010–2013	Treme	Dr. Roger McAlary	7 episodes
2012–2013	Suit Up	Tom Wilshire	9 episodes
2015	I Killed My BFF	Simon	Television film
2016	Roots	Second Gambler	Episode: "Part 3"
2017	Mississippi River Sharks	Big Bill	Television film
2019	I Am the Night	Miller	Episode: "Matador"
