= The Family Tree (TV series) =

- Genre: family drama
- Created by: Carol Evan McKeand
- Starring: Anne Archer; Frank Converse
- Opening theme: Mark Snow
- Country of origin: United States
- No. of seasons: 1
- No. of episodes: 6

Production
- Executive producers: Carol Evan McKeand; Nigel McKeand; Deanne Barkley
- Running time: 60 minutes
- Production companies: The Tree Company, Inc. Saracen Productions; Comworld Productions

Original release
- Network: NBC
- Release: January 22 – February 26, 1983

The Family Tree is a 1983 American television series that aired on NBC, and starred Anne Archer and Frank Converse. The show was produced by Nigel McKeand and Carol Evan McKeand, showrunners of the groundbreaking 1976-80 ABC series Family. Its pilot episode was the 1982 television film The Six of Us. The show was canceled after six episodes due to low ratings.

== Plot ==
Annie Benjamin (Anne Archer) a divorced woman with three children, who worked part-time selling real estate, meets and then marries Kevin Nichols (Frank Converse); a divorced owner of a lumber company with grown children of his own. Annie's children, who all lived with their mother, include oldest son, Sam (Martin Hewitt); Tess (Melora Hardin); and Toby (Jonathan Hall Kovacs) who is deaf. On Kevin's side of the family, he has, besides his teenaged son Jake (James Spader), a grown daughter, Molly Tanner (Ann Dusenberry), who herself was already married. Jake lives with his mother, Elizabeth (Joanna Cassidy); and Annie's children are still very close to their father, Dr. David Benjamin (Alan Feinstein). Much of the stories focus on the problems of the Benjamin children adjusting to Kevin being their stepfather. Of all three of Annie's children, it was Toby, the youngest, who was perhaps most upset about his mother's divorce from his father.

== Cast ==
- Anne Archer as Annie Benjamin Nichols
- Frank Converse as Kevin Nichols
- Jonathan Hall Kovacs as Toby Benjamin
- Melora Hardin as Tess Benjamin
- Martin Hewitt as Sam Benjamin
- James Spader as Jake Nichols
- Evan Ross as Josh Krebs

== Episodes ==
Episode	Summary
Pilot	The Six of Us, 1982 television film. Note: For the series, all roles were recast with the exception of Toby.
Episode 1	Annie becomes overprotective of Toby when the house is burglarized while he's home alone; Sam resents Kevin's role as the man of the house.
Episode 2	Annie decides to attend an out-of-state funeral with her first husband against Kevin's wishes; Tess falls for a dancer. Notes: Guest-starring Michael Cummings as Dance Studio Owner.
Episode 3	Jake becomes romantically involved with Annie's best friend; Kevin avoids the task of learning sign language. Notes: Guest-starring Cassie Yates as Elise.
Episode 4	N/A
Episode 5	Kevin tells his ex-wife that he is no longer legally bound to support her; Tess sneaks out on a date. Notes: Guest-starring Joanna Cassidy as Elizabeth Nichols.
Episode 6	Kevin's daughter shows up after leaving her husband; Tess's father offers a lame excuse to avoid coming to her birthday party. Notes: Guest-starring Ann Dusenberry as Molly Nichols Tanner and Alan Feinstein as Dr. David Benjamin.

== Critical reception ==
David Bianculli of the Akron Beacon-Journal called it "the best family drama in years" and concluded that "Anne Archer, in particular, gives the series performance of the year".

=== Awards ===
The Family Tree was named a finalist for the season's best new series by the Television Critics Association (an award that ultimately went to Cheers).

== Ratings ==
Season	Episodes	Start date	End date	Nielsen rank	Nielsen rating
1982–83	6	January 22, 1983	February 26, 1983	94	N/A

=== Cancellation ===
When an hour of NBC's summer 1983 programming abruptly failed, the network repeated The Family Tree in its place, but this did not lead to a renewal.
