= Melora Hardin =

American actress (born 1967)

- Hardin in 2025
- Born: Melora Diane Hardin; June 29, 1967 (age 59); Houston, Texas, U.S.
- Education: Sarah Lawrence College
- Occupations: Actress; singer
- Years active: 1976–present
- Spouse: Gildart Jackson (m. 1997)
- Children: 2
- Father: Jerry Hardin
- Website: melora.com

Melora Diane Hardin Jackson (born June 29, 1967) is an American actress and singer. She is known for her roles as Jan Levinson on NBC's The Office (2005–2013), Trudy Monk on USA Network's Monk (2004–2009), and Tammy Cashman on Prime's Transparent (2014–2019), for which she was nominated for a Primetime Emmy. She starred as Lorelai in Hannah Montana: The Movie (2009). She also starred as magazine editor-in-chief Jacqueline Carlyle on The Bold Type, which aired on Freeform from 2017 to 2021.

== Early life ==
Hardin was born in Houston, Texas, the daughter of acting manager, coach, and retired actress Diane (née Hill) and actor Jerry Hardin. She is the sister of former Flock (web browser) CEO Shawn Hardin. She moved to San Francisco, California, at age 5 and later attended middle and high school in the San Fernando Valley at Patrick Henry Junior High School and Ulysses S. Grant High School, respectively. She graduated from Sarah Lawrence College.

== Career ==
=== 1976–1999 ===
Hardin started her acting career as the young star of the television series Thunder (1977–1978), and has appeared in over 70 movies and television programs since, including episode 39 of The Love Boat in 1978, two episodes of the medical drama Quincy, M.E. (as Amanda in the 1979 episode "Never a Child" and as Abagail "Abby" Garvin in the infamous 1982 anti-punk rock episode "Next Stop, Nowhere"), two 1981 Little House on the Prairie episodes (as Belinda Stevens in "The Reincarnation of Nellie", Parts 1 and 2) as well as playing Michele Pierson in the 1983 television movie Little House: Look Back to Yesterday. Hardin appeared as Whitney Dunbar, opposite C. Thomas Howell, in the 1986 film, Soul Man. She starred as Baby in the short-lived 1988 television series Dirty Dancing (based on the 1987 film of the same name) and two 1992 episodes of Quantum Leap (as Abigail in "Trilogy", Parts 2 and 3). She co-starred in the 1990 dance movie Lambada as Sandy. She appeared in Absolute Power (1997) as Christy Sullivan and played Ross's dirty-talking love interest in the season 1 Friends episode "The One with the Stoned Guy".

She was also originally cast in Back to the Future (1985) as Jennifer Parker alongside Eric Stoltz, who starred as Marty McFly. Stoltz was fired shortly after filming began and was replaced with Michael J. Fox. Hardin was deemed too tall to star alongside Fox, and she was later replaced by Claudia Wells.

=== 2000–present ===
Hardin starred in the 2000–2001 series Cover Me: Based on the True Life of an FBI Family, and she played the recurring role of Trudy Monk, the title character's deceased wife, on the USA Network series Monk (2004-2009). She appeared on the series NCIS as former Petty Officer Erin Toner in the episode "The Curse". In 2005, Hardin portrayed Linda Evans in Dynasty: The Making of a Guilty Pleasure, a fictionalized television movie based on the creation and behind the scenes production of the 1980s primetime soap opera Dynasty. Hardin played Jan Levinson in The Office (2005–2013), a former corporate manager and love interest of Michael Scott.

Hardin appeared in the 2006 film Thank You for Smoking, and appears in Hannah Montana: The Movie as the love interest of Billy Ray Cyrus's character. The film premiered on April 10, 2009. She played the role of Fantine in the Hollywood Bowl's concert of Les Misérables in Summer 2008. Hardin appeared in several episodes of the popular web show Elevator on YouTube.

Hardin made her Broadway debut as Roxie Hart in the revival of Chicago: The Musical on December 29, 2008. She stayed with the show until February 12, 2009. Also in 2009, Hardin was cast as Principal Jane Masterson in the popular comedy film 17 Again. Hardin was cast as a major character in Outlaw, playing a powerful senior partner of an elite law firm, and the main love interest to the series' protagonist, played by Jimmy Smits. Hardin played the role of Isabelle Palmer's mother Nancy in An American Girl: Isabelle Dances Into the Spotlight.

Hardin sang the U.S. national anthem at the Anaheim Ducks’ season-opening hockey game on October 13, 2010, and for the Phoenix Coyotes three days later.

In September 2021, she was announced as one of the celebrities competing on season 30 of Dancing with the Stars. Her professional dance partner, Artem Chigvintsev, and she made it to the semifinals and ultimately finished in sixth place.

Hardin originated the role of Francine Blake in the 2024 Broadway play McNeal, written by Ayad Akhtar and starring Robert Downey Jr. The show opened on September 30, 2024 and the limited engagement ran for 53 performances.

== Personal life ==
Hardin has been married to actor Gildart Jackson since 1997. They have two daughters.

== Filmography ==
=== Film ===
Year	Film	Role	Notes
1978	Something Queer is Happening at the Library	Jill	Short film
1979	The North Avenue Irregulars	Carmel	
1985	Papa Was a Preacher	Janette	
1986	Iron Eagle	Katie	
1986	Soul Man	Whitney Dunbar	
1989	Big Man on Campus	Cathy	
1989	The Jeweler's Shop	Monica	
1990	Lambada	Sandy Thomas	
1991	The Rocketeer	South Seas singer	
1993	Reckless Kelly	Robin Banks	
1994	The Pornographer	Sasha Leon Hoffner	
1995	Chameleon	Jill Hallman	
1996	The Undercover Kid	Clyde	
1997	Absolute Power	Christy Sullivan	
1998	Erasable You	Calamity	
1999	Seven Girlfriends	Laura	
2000	Certain Guys	Mary Beth	
2002	The Hot Chick	Carol	
2004	El Padrino	Jane	
2005	Thank You For Smoking	Interviewer	
2007	Drive Thru	Marcia Carpenter	
2007	The Dukes	Diane	
2007	Boxboarders!	Ruth Keene	
2007	The Comebacks	Barb Fields	
2007	The Violin	Gertrude Bloch	Short film
2008	27 Dresses	Maureen	
2009	17 Again	Principal Jane Masterson	
2009	Hannah Montana: The Movie	Lorelai	
2009	You	Miranda	Also director and producer
2010	Knucklehead	Mary	
2011	I Melt with You	Jane	
2012	Zombie Hamlet	Pam	
2012	Beauty and the Least: The Misadventures of Ben Banks	Mary Andrews	
2012	Taking the Edge Off		Short film
2014	An American Girl: Isabelle Dances Into the Spotlight	Nancy Palmer	Direct-to-video
2015	Self/less	Judy O'Neill	
2017	Anything	Rita	
2017	Golden Vanity	Mabel Montgomery-Mayflower	
2018	Cruel Hearts	Grace	
2021	Caged	Officer Sacks	
2023	Clock	Dr. Elizabeth Simmons	
2026	Drummer Boy	Rachel Clem	

=== Television ===
Year	Title	Role	Notes
1976	Police Story	Sheila	Episodes: "The Jar: Parts 1 & 2"
1977	Thunder	Cindy Prescott	Main role (12 episodes)
1977	The Cliffwood Avenue Kids	Melora	TV series
1978	The Love Boat	Courtney Chenault	1 episode
1979	Quincy, M.E.	Amanda	Episode: "Never a Child"
1980	Diff'rent Strokes	Emily Morehouse	Episode: "Skin Deep or True Blue"
1980	ABC Afterschool Special	Amy Warner	Episode: "What Are Friends For?"
1980	Haywire	Brooke Hayward, age 11	TV film
1980–1981	Secrets of Midland Heights	Micki Carroll	Regular role (10 episodes)
1981	Little House on the Prairie	Belinda Stevens	Episodes: "The Reincarnation of Nellie: Parts 1 & 2"
1982	Quincy, M.E.	Abigail "Abby" Garvin	Episode: "Next Stop, Nowhere"
1983	The Family Tree	Tess Benjamin	TV series
1983	Little House: Look Back to Yesterday	Michele Pierson	TV movie
1983	Magnum, P.I.	Nancy Perkins Gillis	Episode: "Luther Gillis: File #521"
1984	Mama Malone	Kathleen	Episode: "The Education of Frankie"
1985	The Best Times	Joy Villafranco	Regular role (6 episodes)
1986	Hotel	Beth	Episode: "Heroes"
1988–1989	Dirty Dancing	Frances "Baby" Kellerman	Main role (11 episodes)
1989	Tour of Duty	Christine Pierson	Episodes: "Sins of the Father", "Sealed with a Kiss"
1990	Shangri-La Plaza	Amy	TV film
1991	Equal Justice	Doris Walsh	Episode: "Who Speaks for the Children?"
1992	Miles from Nowhere	Teresa	TV film
1992	Mann & Machine	Louise Trotsky	Episode: "Torch Song"
1992	Quantum Leap	Abigail Fuller	Episodes: "For Your Love", "The Last Door"
1993	Moon Over Miami	Emily Booker	Episode: "My Old Flame"
1994	Murder, She Wrote	Cindy Warrick	Episode: "Roadkill"
1994	Golden Gate	Susan Carlino	TV film
1994	Renegade	Laura McMillan	Episode: "Carrick O'Quinn"
1994	Matlock	Lisa Swift	Episode: "The Scandal"
1994	Lois & Clark: The New Adventures of Superman	Molly Flynn	Episode: "Operation Blackout"
1995	Friends	Celia	Episode: "The One with the Stoned Guy"
1995	Touched by an Angel	Lizbeth Chamberlain	Episode: "The Big Bang"
1995	Diagnosis: Murder	Savannah Bellows	Episode: "The New Healers"
1996	Renegade	Kelly Anderson	Episode: "Paradise Lost"
1996	Caroline in the City	Beth	Episode: "Caroline and the Bridesmaids"
1997	Things That Go Bump	Chloe Garrett	TV film
1997	Orleans	Gina Vitelli	Episodes: "Luther's Temptation", "When the Saints Go Marching In"
1997	Tower of Terror	Claire Poulet	TV film
1997–1998	The Tom Show	Lorraine	Episodes: "Tom's First Date", "The Centerfold"
1998	Timecop	Edith Thomas	Episode: "Lost Voyage"
1998	The Pretender	Wendy Dawson	Episode: "Homefront"
1999	Payne	Danielle Harris	Episode: "Gossip Checks In and a Cat Checks Out"
1999	Diagnosis: Murder	Melanie Cooper	Episode: "Trash TV: Part 1"
2000–2001	Cover Me	Barbara Arno	Main role (24 episodes)
2001	Once and Again	Samantha Aldrich	Episode: "Moving On"
2002	Family Guy	Patsy Ramsey (voice)	Episode: "Brian Wallows and Peter's Swallows"
2002	Judging Amy	Rosalie Leavitt	Episode: "Roses and Truth"
2003	The Division	Cheryl Lynn Brinkmeyer	Episode: "Rush to Judgment"
2003	NCIS	Former Petty Officer Erin Toner	Episode: "The Curse"
2004	The Hollywood Mom's Mystery	Summer Rossner	TV film
2004	Boston Legal	Sharon Brant	Episode: "Head Cases"
2004–2009	Monk	Trudy Monk	Recurring role (10 episodes)
2005	CSI: Crime Scene Investigation	Sports Book Manager	Episode: "Big Middle"
2005	Dynasty: The Making of a Guilty Pleasure	Linda Evans	TV film
2005–2013	The Office	Jan Levinson	Regular role; 46 episodes
2006	Without a Trace	Pamela Seaver	Episode: "Rage"
2006	Gilmore Girls	Carolyn Bates	Episode: "Partings"
2006	The Office: The Accountants	Jan Levinson-Gould	Episode: "The Books Don't Balance"
2008	Mom, Dad and Her	Emma	TV film
2008	Yo Gabba Gabba!	Herself	Episode: "Birthday"
2010	Outlaw	Claire Sax	Recurring role (4 episodes)
2011	CSI: Miami	Wendy Colton	Episode: "G.O."
2012–2013	Wedding Band	Roxie Rutherford	Main role (10 episodes)
2013	Scandal	Shelley Meyers	Episode: "Say Hello to My Little Friend"
2014	Killer Women	Nan Reed	Episode: "Some Men Need Killing"
2014	Do It Yourself	Kaye	TV film
2014–2019	Transparent	Tammy Cashman	Recurring role (14 episodes)
2015	Falling Skies	Captain Katie Marshall	Episodes: "Everybody Has Their Reasons", "Stalag 14th Virginia"
2016	The Death of Eva Sofia Valdez	Courtney Monroe	TV film
2017	The Blacklist	Isabella Stone	2 episodes
2017	When We Rise	Carole Midgen	Episode: "Night III: Parts IV and V"
2017–2021	The Bold Type	Jacqueline Carlyle	Main role
2019, 2022	A Million Little Things	Patricia Bloom	5 episodes
2020	Celebrity Family Feud	Herself	Episode: "The Bold Type vs. RuPaul's Drag Race"
2021	Dancing with the Stars	Herself	Contestant, Season 30
2022	Love, Classified	Emelia	Hallmark Channel movie
2023	Mr. Monk's Last Case: A Monk Movie	Trudy Monk	TV movie

Director
Year	Title	Notes
2009	You	
2020	The Bold Type	Episode: "Snow Day"

== Awards and nominations ==
Year	Award	Category	Nominated work	Result
1984	Young Artist Awards	Best Young Actress in a Drama Series	The Family Tree	Nominated
1985	Young Artist Awards	Best Young Supporting Actress in a Daytime or Nighttime Drama	Two Marriages	Won
1987	Young Artist Awards	Exceptional Performance by a Young Actress Starring in a Feature Film – Comedy or Drama	Papa Was a Preacher	Nominated
2007	Screen Actors Guild Awards	Outstanding Performance by an Ensemble in a Comedy Series	The Office	Won
2008	Screen Actors Guild Awards	Outstanding Performance by an Ensemble in a Comedy Series	The Office	Won
2009	Screen Actors Guild Awards	Outstanding Performance by an Ensemble in a Comedy Series	The Office	Nominated
2016	Primetime Emmy Awards	Outstanding Guest Actress in a Comedy Series	Transparent	Nominated
