= Whodunnit? (2013 TV series) =

- Genre: Reality; Murder mystery
- Created by: Anthony Zuiker
- Presented by: Gildart Jackson
- Country of origin: United States
- Original language: English
- No. of seasons: 1
- No. of episodes: 9

Production
- Executive producers: Anthony Zuiiker; Cris Abrego
- Producers: Matt Weinburg; Trey Callaway
- Production location: Beverly Hills
- Running time: 42-43 minutes
- Production companies: Dare to Pass; 51 Minds Entertainment

Original release
- Network: ABC
- Release: June 23 – August 18, 2013

Whodunnit? is an American murder mystery-based reality television show broadcast on ABC. The series premiered on June 23, 2013, and concluded its first season on August 18, 2013. The series was not renewed for a second season. The series is hosted by Gildart Jackson, who plays the mansion's butler, Giles.

In each episode, the competitors witness a "murder" (staged by production) committed secretly by one of their numbers, and are instructed to find clues to how the murder was done and the identity of the murderer. Players are privately quizzed on how well they have deduced the mystery; the player with the lowest score becomes the next victim of the murderer, eliminating them from the game.

== Format ==
The series follows 13 guests, one of whom is secretly the "killer" posing as a contestant in the game, living in a Beverly Hills mansion named Rue Manor. They are guided by the butler, Giles (Gildart Jackson) who also acts as the show's host. Within the show's fiction, the guests, along with Giles and two maids, are trapped by the killer within the house grounds until they determine who the killer is. An early episode shows that Giles is wearing an ankle monitor that forbids him from leaving. In many ways, Giles acts as a puppet for the killer; the killer sends messages to Giles, who reads them to the surviving guests.

Each episode, at least one guest is "murdered" (through staged events by production) by the killer, either while the victim is alone or through pre-arranged circumstances while the remaining guests are congregated as to avoid revealing their identity. After the shock of the event, Giles offers the remaining guests an opportunity to search one of three areas (usually the crime scene, the last known whereabouts, or the morgue containing the victim's body) to discover clues about how the murder was carried out. Guests are free to select which area to search, though they are allowed access to only one area with a limited amount of time, and are confined to the bounds set by production, sometimes marked off with police tape. Guests then participate in a riddle challenge that leads them in a competitive search through the mansion. The guest who is able to complete the challenge receives an additional clue that may greatly help in solving how the murder was committed.

Guests are given limited opportunities to congregate, where they can share, withhold, or lie about whatever information they find from their investigations and riddle challenges; at all other times, guests are isolated from each other. On the show, this led to the ad hoc formation of two informal teams that tried to assure information was withheld from the other team, in an attempt to assure their own team's advancement to the next round. Though the murders and riddle challenges are presented as having been masterminded by the killer, in reality the guest playing the killer is as unaware of upcoming deaths and challenges as the other guests, and is not given any information from production about the larger social game.

Later, guests are individually taken to the mansion library where, in monologue, they describe to the unseen killer how they believe the murder took place and make an accusation as to who the killer is. However, each elimination is actually based on the guests' performance on an unaired written quiz (similar to The Mole) that objectively assesses the accuracy of their theories. The quiz consists of 12-15 short answer questions about the investigation sites and the riddle challenge; ties are broken based on the time taken to complete the quiz.

During dinner, Giles presents a message from the killer. The message states which guest had the most correct theory and is subsequently spared from being the killer's next victim. The message then fully explains how the murder was completed. After this, Giles hands an envelope to each remaining guest. Those receiving cards with the word "Spared" performed well enough to advance to the next episode. The lowest-scoring guest, along with at least one other low-scoring guest will receive a card with the word "Scared." As noted above, the guest playing the killer is as unaware of how the murders are committed as the rest of the guests are, and so may also receive a "Scared" card as well; however, the killer cannot be eliminated. The lowest-scoring guest is then eliminated from the competition by having been discovered to be "murdered" by the killer in some way at the end of each episode as a cliffhanger, thus introducing the murder to be solved in the next episode.

In the finale, the final three guests (the killer and the two remaining players) compete in a multi-part riddle and memory challenge based on elements from all of the previous murders. The first player to complete this challenge is directed to a final room to confront the killer, while the last player is sent elsewhere and subsequently eliminated. The killer confesses his or her identity to the last guest and congratulates them for winning the game. That guest leaves the estate with US$250,000.

== Production ==
ABC picked up Whodunnit? for nine episodes on February 6, 2013. As he was also the creator of the successful CSI franchise, creator and executive producer Anthony Zuiker was able to bring the crew and set pieces from the CSI series to assist in the production of the series.

The first victim, Sheri, was not an actual contestant, rather she was planted in the cast with the knowledge that she would be first one "killed," in order set up the "murder" to be solved in the first episode.

Each of the contestants was asked prior to the start of taping if he or she would like to play the killer; the guest ultimately chosen received a guaranteed stipend. The killer's identity was a well-kept secret during taping, to the extent that even executive producer Zuiker didn't know who the killer was for the first eight episodes.

The show has a $750,000 per day budget, with approximately 250 people involved in the show's production each day. This included award-winning makeup artists to help make the "deaths" of the guests look authentic. Stunt doubles are used in the show's more dangerous scenes. A female stunt double shaved her head to play Dontae, due to his small size, as he was set on fire during his death scene. The mountain lion that was present during Don's elimination cost $5,000 per hour, and a dummy was used in place of Don in shots where they both appeared.

Each episode took about 3 days to shoot: the first day revolved around the investigation, the second day included the riddle challenge and dinner ceremony, and the third day was spent with each of the guests doing solo interviews. After each murder, guests would have to play their own "corpse" in the morgue, though after the team had completed their examination, the murdered guest was allowed some brief time to say goodbye to the team.

In a post-show interview, Cris confirmed that she did not know any information the other guests did not, as she could have rigged the outcome of the show if she did. She stated that the only direction she ever received from the producers was to stop winning riddles after she had won two in a row. She also confirmed that there were no true clues to identifying the killer on the show, and that the producers chose to highlight her coincidental experience with guns and horses (in their respective episodes) to serve as hints for the viewer.

== Broadcast ==
The first season of Whodunnit? premiered on June 23, 2013 on ABC. It aired nine episodes in the Sundays at 9:00 p.m. Eastern/8:00 p.m. Central time slot, with the finale airing on August 18, 2013. It was not renewed for a second season.

== Contestants ==
| Name | Age | Occupation | Residence | Eliminated |
|---|---|---|---|---|
| Kam Perez | 30 | Homeland Security attorney | New York City, New York | Winner |
| Cris Crotz | 27 | Ex-beauty queen | Costa Mesa, California | The Killer |
| Lindsey Anderson | 27 | Engineer | Boston, Massachusetts | Runner-Up |
| Melina Alves | 29 | Flight attendant | Chicago, Illinois | Episode 9 |
| Ronnie Padron | 42 | Bounty hunter | Kenilworth, New Jersey | Episode 8 |
| Geno Walker | 33 | Bar trivia host | Chicago, Illinois | Episode 7 |
| Dana Davis Blake | 39 | Cardiac nurse | Asheville, North Carolina | Episode 6 |
| Sasha Horne | 28 | Journalist | Washington, D.C. | Episode 6 |
| Ulysses Wilson | 30 | Attorney | Harrisburg, Pennsylvania | Episode 5 |
| Don Tabak | 62 | Ex-homicide detective | Santa Clarita, California | Episode 4 |
| Adrianna Iwasinski | 40 | Television crime reporter | Oklahoma City, Oklahoma | Episode 3 |
| Dontae Mosbey | 27 | Insurance investigator | Long Beach, California | Episode 2 |
| Sheri Marsh | 28 | Ex-NFL cheerleader | Los Angeles, California | Episode 1 (Note: Sheri was not a contestant; rather, she was planted in the cast to be the first player murdered.) |

== Game history ==
The chart combines each guest's progress through the game with the guest he or she accused of being the killer in each episode. There is no correlation between the guests' suspicions of the killer's identity and who was eliminated in any particular episode.

The irrelevance of the killer's identity (despite the title of the show) is epitomized by Lindsey's row, as she correctly identified the killer from week one, but failed to succeed in the final challenge, resulting in her elimination. Likewise, Kam, the winner, never once guessed the killer's identity.

| | Week 1 | Week 2 | Week 3 | Week 4 | Week 5 | Week 6 | Week 7 | Week 8 | Finale | Accusations Against |
|---|---|---|---|---|---|---|---|---|---|---|
| Kam | Geno | Geno | Geno | Geno | Geno | Geno | Melina | Lindsey | Winner | 16 |
| Cris | Adrianna | Adrianna | Geno | Geno | Lindsey | Lindsey | Lindsey | Lindsey | The Killer | 16 |
| Lindsey | Cris | Cris | Cris | Cris | Cris | Cris | Cris | Cris | Runner Up | 7 |
| Melina | Cris | Cris | Cris | Cris | Cris | Kam | Kam | Cris | Murdered | 1 |
| Ronnie | Dontae | Adrianna | Kam | Kam | Kam | Kam | Kam | Murdered | | 0 |
| Geno | Kam | Kam | Kam | Kam | Kam | Kam | Murdered | | | 10 |
| Dana | Adrianna | Adrianna | Kam | Kam | Lindsey | Murdered | | | | 1 |
| Sasha | Adrianna | Ulysses | Ulysses | Kam | Lindsey | Murdered | | | | 0 |
| Ulysses | Dontae | Adrianna | Geno | Geno | Murdered | | | | | 2 |
| Don | Dana | Cris | Cris | Murdered | | | | | | 0 |
| Adrianna | Dontae | Kam | Murdered | | | | | | | 8 |
| Dontae | Adrianna | Murdered | | | | | | | | 3 |

Color key
– Spared - The guest had the most correct theory and survived. (If letters are blue, that means they also solved a riddle).
- Riddle Solver - The guest was able to solve a riddle, but did not have the most correct theory
– Spared - The guest performed well enough to survive.
– Scared - The guest was marked for possible elimination but survived.
– Scared - The guest was marked for possible elimination, had the least correct theory, and was thus killed.
– The guest was the runner-up and was killed.
– The guest was revealed to be the killer.
– The guest won the competition.

== Episodes ==
Each "murder" is listed under the episode in which its events are investigated, although brief footage of each murder (except for the first and penultimate) is shown at the end of the preceding episode as to reveal who was eliminated.

| No. | Title | Original release date |
|---|---|---|
| 1 | "High Voltage" | June 23, 2013 |
The 13 guests are welcomed to Rue Manor by the butler, Giles. After a brief meet-and-greet, the guests split up to explore the house, but race back when they hear a shattering of glass. They find Sheri "dead" by a broken fish tank in the house's foyer with exposed wires from a nearby lamp electrifying her body. Investigation: The investigation covers three areas, with the following clues identified by various guests: The crime scene (the foyer): The scene reveals the broken fish tank, a severed lamp wire, and a large blood stain underneath where Sheri's head lay.; The morgue: The only apparent wounds on Sheri's body are shards of glass in her forehead, and a large pellet pulled from the back of her neck.; The last known whereabouts (Sheri's room): The door to Sheri's room shows signs of forced entry. The shower in Sheri's bathroom is still running. A few letters are seen written into the fogged portion of the bathroom mirror, leading the investigators to use a nearby steamer to reveal a message by fogging the entire mirror: "Meet me at the fish tank, I have vital info for you."; Riddle challenge: The guests are each given a key that has imprinted on it "13:17" and the image of two crowns. This turns out to refer to the biblical verse 2 Kings 13:17, which starts: "Open the east window." The guests find one of the panes of glass missing at the eastern window of the main room, along with a three-digit number engraved in the window frame. This turns out to be the code to a combination lock on a garden storage bin outside, visible straight ahead from the window. Opening it reveals a crowbar and a slingshot. Ronnie is the first to find this clue, though several guests are with him at the time. Solution: The killer severed the wire on the lamp by the fish tank and removed a pane of glass from the main room. The killer then used a crowbar to break into Sheri's room while she was showering and wrote the message on the mirror in the bathroom, and then waited outside for her arrival. Sheri saw the message upon leaving the shower and headed downstairs. Once Sheri reached the fish tank and turned her back, the killer fired a pellet through the open window into the back of Sheri's neck. Sheri was killed on impact, falling forward into the tank, damaging the glass, and then falling back onto the rug. The crack on the tank shortly gave way, but allowed the killer time to hide the tools in the garden bin. The water from the tank splashed over Sheri's body and the nearby carpet, and the spliced lamp cord electrified the area. Best Theory: Sasha Scared: Don and Dontae
| 2 | "Fire Starter" | June 30, 2013 |
After the previous dinner, the guests adjourn to their rooms for the evening, with Giles informing them they have special pajamas provided by the manor to wear. During the night, the fire alarm goes off, and all the guests, except Dontae, gather outside. As they wait, Dontae comes running out of the house, engulfed in flames, and jumps into the pool. Despite the flames being doused, Dontae is found "dead." Killed: Dontae Investigation: The investigation covers three areas, with the following clues identified by various guests: The crime scene (the pool): With the body removed, the guests find loose scraps from Dontae's pajamas and socks, finding that neither matches with what the other guests were given to wear. They also find a medallion inscribed with a seal of St. Agatha at the bottom of the pool.; The morgue: Dontae's chest has the largest burnt area, meaning that it was likely the point of ignition; his right hand and arm are also severely burned. The morgue's investigators also discover that Dontae's pajamas are different from the other guests'.; The last known whereabouts (Dontae's room): The door has a large spread of soot from the door handle, and the nearby lampshade is partially burned, but no other parts of the room seem affected. An empty case by Dontae's bed includes a note suggesting there was a gift for Dontae from St. Agatha, the patron saint of fire, to help protect him. A shaggy rug leads from the bed to the door.; Riddle challenge: Each guest is given a white flag with the house crest on it and is told to look for "fire in liquid form." This clue leads to a bottle of benzene that, when sprayed on the flag, reveals a pink strip across the house crest. This guides them to a door upstairs that has a similar pink stripe running through the house crest on it; the door also has a rug in front of it. Kam reaches the door, receiving a brief electric shock when he attempts to open it; this shock ignites the pink stripe on the door. Cris and Ulysses are with him at that time. Solution: The killer provided Dontae with different pajamas that had been sprayed with odorless benzene and special socks that were more prone to generating static electricity. In addition, the killer left behind a pendant of St. Agatha with a note that read, "Patron saint, protector from fire. Sleep well." When Dontae retired for the night, he put on the clothes and pendant and went to sleep. The killer then set off the fire alarm at 4:38 in the morning. Like the other guests, Dontae got up but ran across the shag carpet in his special socks, generating static electricity. As he reached the doorknob, there was a spark of static discharge that ignited the benzene-soaked clothes, setting Dontae ablaze and eventually killing him. Dontae died from his burns, but not before he was able to jump into the pool. Best Theory: Ulysses Scared: Adrianna and Dana
| 3 | "Kaboom" | July 7, 2013 |
The group retires for the evening from the previous dinner. In the early morning, Adrianna is frightened by something in the breakfast nook, races out of the manor into a waiting golf cart, and attempts to leave the manor. As she tries to drive off, the golf cart explodes, sending Adrianna flying into a nearby tree to her death; the commotion wakes the other guests. Killed: Adrianna Investigation: The investigation covers three areas, with the following clues identified by various guests: The crime scene (near the gates): Among the wreckage, the investigators find that the golf cart seat had been sliced open underneath, as if to plant something inside. A large tree branch had purposely been placed on the paved path, which apparently forced the cart onto the nearby grass. The investigators also discover a nearby post with a broken video camera mounted on it.; The last known whereabouts (the breakfast nook): The TV in the breakfast nook is still on. As the guests investigate, they see the television signal interrupted with surveillance footage of Adrianna; this is followed by the message, "Drive off the property if you want to live." Several doors are marked with footprints, and almost every set of doors have been locked from the opposite side with cable ties securing them in place. Only one door leading outside is otherwise open.; The morgue (at the body's location, up in a tree): Adrianna's hand is holding onto a remote control, and while most of her body is burned, the most burn marks appear to be by her feet and legs.; Riddle challenge: The guests are given a golf ball with the words "13 steps" printed on it. This points to a golf cart parked outside down a stairway with 13 steps; the cart holds various remote gate openers with a clue leading to video tapes stored in an outside trash bin. Though the tapes have no useful video, the inside cover of each tape has a final clue that directs the guests to the attic. Ronnie alone is first to the attic, where he finds another monitor and a television remote with a "bomb" button on it. When he follows instructions on the monitor to press this button, the monitor shows Ronnie the footage of the golf cart exploding. Solution: The killer had planted a bomb in the golf cart and set the branch in the path. The killer then left a DVD in the disc drive of the television in the breakfast nook. As Adrianna watched television, the killer remotely started the DVD, instructing her to drive off the premises in order to stay alive. Adrianna tried to leave the room, but the killer had used zip-ties to secure all the doors except the one leading outside. She reached the golf cart and sped off, and as she approached the gates, she was forced to drive off the path to avoid the tree branch. Adrianna tried to use the remote control to open the gates, but instead this activated the camera near the scene. The killer, already holed up in the attic with video surveillance equipment, used this as a signal to remotely trigger the bomb on the cart, killing Adrianna and sending her body flying into a tree. Best Theory: Lindsey Scared: Dana and Don
| 4 | "Mountain Lyin" | July 14, 2013 |
Giles informs the guests that a formal breakfast will be served the next morning. At breakfast, the guests are happy to see Dana return, but are shocked to see Don arrive safely as well; for the first time, no one has been killed overnight. Steak and eggs are served to the guests, but Scared guests Dana and Don receive raw steak. While Dana shares a cooked steak with Ulysses, Don goes to the kitchen alone to cook his raw steak, despite protests from the other guests. As Don is cooking his steak, a secret panel opens and a cougar leaps out and attacks Don, the sounds terrifying the other guests. Giles subdues the cougar with a tranquilizer dart before the guests are allowed to investigate. Killed: Don Investigation: The investigation covers three areas, with the following clues identified by various guests: The crime scene (the kitchen): A pressure pad had been placed in front of the cooking stove where Don went to cook his steak. When stepped on, the pressure pad opens a secret panel behind him, revealing where the cougar had been hiding. In addition, the stove's heating coil had been rigged.; The suspect (the cougar; in place of the last known whereabouts): A tag around the cougar's neck indicates that it had been deliberately brought here. The cougar has the steak in its mouth and some blood on its paws.; The morgue: While there were gashes noted in his leg and neck, there was a surprisingly small amount of blood on his body. Don's skin is noted to be blotchy in an odd pink color. A small amount of white powder is found on the front of his shirt.; Riddle challenge: The guests are given a magnifying glass and a clue on a small slip of paper, which leads them to the morgue where a periodic table is posted on the wall. The riddle points out the letters 'C' and 'N', the atomic symbols for carbon and nitrogen. Using a magnifying glass to read small print written underneath those two elements (which, not coincidentally, are found in cyanide, CN^{−}) leads them upstairs to a closet with a clue written on a table cloth. This instructs the contestants to get their hunger for knowledge fed, as well as giving them a safe combination. A savvy Geno headed straight for the library, where he headed for the safe. Inside, was a blueprint that described how the stove was rigged. Solution: After receiving an un-cooked steak for breakfast, Don went to the kitchen to cook it. When he stepped on the pressure pad that had been placed in front of the stove, a secret panel behind him opened, releasing the cougar. Not noticing the cougar behind him, Don turned on the stove. As the killer had rigged the kitchen stove to release cyanide, once Don turned it on, he inhaled a lethal amount of cyanide resulting in a quick death. Don fell to the ground, and the hungry cougar jumped on him and scratched him. The cougar then went to retrieve the uncooked steak on the stove, just before Giles tranquilized it. Best Theory: Dana Scared: Kam and Ulysses
| 5 | "Bum Ba Dee Da" | July 21, 2013 |
At dinner, the killer calls Giles. The killer has left a prerecorded message of the guests speaking, their words stitched together to create a message instructing them to meet at the stables the next morning. Giles leads the guests on a horseback ride through Rue Woods that surround the manor. As they progress forward, the horses are suddenly startled by a flock of birds. While the other guests control their horses, Ulysses and his horse are seen drifting from the group. Some of the other guests call out to him, but it's too late as he slumps over, and both he and his horse take a tumble. Killed: Ulysses Investigation: Much of the episode takes place in Rue Woods instead of the mansion. The investigation covers three areas, with the following clues identified by various guests: The crime scene (the trail): A scarlet kingsnake is found in the horse's left saddle bag. Also, a tripwire was found to have released the birds from a cage.; The last known whereabouts (the horse stable): All the horses' nameplates are names from Greek mythology, except for one named Oleander, whose window has oleander flowers growing through it. Hidden in a nearby spittoon is some oleander crushed with a mortar and pestle. Also, there is a hammer and a box of "ten finishing nails"; an unaired clue shows only eight nails in the box.; The morgue (an outdoor makeshift one): A nearby sign displays poisonous and non-poisonous flora and fauna in the Rue Woods, including the poisonous oleander and the non-poisonous scarlet kingsnake. Ulysses has two small puncture wounds on his right calf. All of his clothes are hanging on a nearby clothesline, and his jeans reveal matching punctures. Later, it was revealed that there were wooden splinters where the jeans were punctured; this was missed by the guests.; Riddle challenge: The guests are told to find the right path by "looking to the sky." The guests then race up a trail to a three-way fork, each path marked by a colored arrow. The path marked by the blue arrow (representing the color of sky) leads to a table with individual puzzles for each of the guests that, when solved, gives them a path to follow through the woods. The path leads to a shack filled with snakes. Those that arrive at the shack are allowed two minutes alone to find the murder weapon inside and solve the challenge. If their time runs out, they have to go to the back of the line and the next guest to have arrived has their turn. Cris alone finds the murder weapon: a small floorboard with two nails sticking out of it. Solution: The killer first set up the bird cage and tripwire along the trail. Back at the stable, the killer hammered two nails into a floorboard, in a pattern similar to what a snakebite would look like. The nails were laced with poisonous ground oleander. While riding along the path, one of the guest's horses set off the tripwire, which released the birds, startling the horses. In the ensuing commotion, the killer secretly struck Ulysses in the right leg with the floorboard, lethally poisoning him. Ulysses lost control of his horse, and both he and his horse fell. The killer later hid the floorboard and placed the non-poisonous kingsnake in Ulysses' horse's left saddle bag as a red herring. Best Theory: Cris Scared: Dana, Geno, and Sasha
| 6 | "All the World's a Stage" | July 28, 2013 |
The guests return to Rue Manor for the night. The next morning, the guests are in their rooms when they begin to hear organ music play. Geno, one of the three Scared guests, runs downstairs and finds Sasha posed at the piano, as if playing, and Dana posed standing near her, leaning on the piano with a martini glass by her side. Both are dead. Killed: Dana and Sasha Investigation: There was no crime scene to investigate, though it was noted that the foyer, where the victims were found, was very chilly. Instead, teams searched two last known whereabouts (each of the two victims' rooms). Because the two rooms were adjacent to each other, each team had their own time to search the individual room and the shared hallway leading out from it. The investigation covers three areas, with the following clues identified by various guests: Sasha's last known whereabouts (Sasha's room): There are large shoe prints and cart tracks on the floor; it's noted that the cart tracks leading into the room are lighter than the tracks leading out of the room. On the bed, a washcloth with a lipstick mark is found.; Dana's last known whereabouts (Dana's room): The door is locked, and a metal device is found sticking out from underneath the door. The team uses the contraption to open the locked door from the outside. Large shoe prints and cart tracks are seen on the floor. A set of footprints leads out from the bed to the door.; Shared hallway (both of the teams above had access to this area): The two adjacent rooms open out to a carpet rug, which shows both large shoe prints as well as cart tracks leading in and out of both rooms. Footprints are also seen leading out of Dana's room. Further down the hallway, blood drops on the wooden floor lead to a hidden elevator.; The morgue: Both women have one wrist slashed open. They each have bits of cloth fiber in their nostrils as well. Each of their pajamas are found beside them; while Sasha's are clean, Dana's have a bloodstain dripping down the back of the left pant leg. This leads to the discovery of superficial cut wounds on Dana's left back.; Riddle challenge: The guests find effigies of themselves sitting in the seats of the movie theater. The first clue is presented in the form of a silent film, which leads them to find a second clue on the keys of the piano where Sasha and Dana were found. The clue contains a scalpel and another riddle that points them back to the movie theater. Using the scalpel, a final clue is found by cutting into the back of the effigy. This leads to the morgue, where a hidden room is found behind a cabinet. The scalpel is used to break into the sealed room, which turns out to be a second makeshift morgue, the objective of the riddle challenge. Cris is the first to find this. The hidden room contains two autopsy tables with a large amount of blood near their drains, a three-wheeled cart, a second washcloth with a lipstick mark on it (similar to the one found in Sasha's room), a bottle of chloroform, a hunting knife, and a rack of clothes is also seen. Large size 13 sneakers with paper stuffed into the soles, so that someone with smaller feet can wear them, is also found. Solution: The killer, wearing the large sneakers, used the door-opening contraption to break into Sasha's room and entered with the cart. After knocking Sasha out using the chloroform-soaked rag, the killer loaded her body into the cart and left the room. Next door, the killer re-used the contraption to open Dana's room, leaving the device behind. Waking Dana up at knifepoint, the killer coerced her out of bed and down the hall, jabbing the knife to her back and leaving a small blood trail. The killer forced Dana to roll the cart with Sasha to the elevator and to the makeshift morgue. After Dana tearfully placed Sasha on the autopsy table, the killer then knocked her out with another chloroform-soaked rag and put her on the other autopsy table. The killer slashed each of their wrists, killing them by letting all their blood drain out. After dressing them, the killer then posed them at the piano once rigor mortis had begun to set in, and turned up the air conditioning in order to keep them in place. Best Theory: Kam Scared: Geno and Ronnie
| 7 | "Party Crasher" | August 4, 2013 |
The killer has a message for Giles to read: the guests are all about to get "lei'd". The guests return to their rooms to change into Hawaiian attire, and then head to the foyer, where they find it has been transformed into a luau. Giles joins in on the fun, handing his jacket off to Geno before doing the limbo. When Geno proposes a toast, the lights suddenly go off and a crash is heard. Returning with flashlights, the guests find Geno dead, crushed underneath a chandelier. Killed: Geno Investigation: Prior to the guests splitting up, an irritated Giles asks about the whereabouts of his cell phone, which has gone missing. The investigation covers three areas, with the following clues identified by various guests: The crime scene (the foyer): The chandelier was found to have been lowered, as its cord extends from the ceiling to the floor. It's noted that the smeared blood on the floor appears to have originated from underneath Geno, rather than forming an outline around him if the chandelier had killed him. The Rue Manor crest on the dance floor is highlighted in green paint. A dual-pronged timer is found plugged into a nearby electrical socket with a scorch mark surrounding it, appearing to have caused a short circuit. Apparently, hidden behind nearby curtains was a lever that controlled the chandelier; this was missed by the guests.; The last known whereabouts (Geno's room): On Geno's bed, there is a lei made of kukui nutshells covered in green paint. The lei is fitted with keyrings, serving as a homemade garrote. There is also a notepad with the remnant of a page that had been torn off. What had been written is still imprinted, and lightly shading with a pencil reveals the message, "Steal Giles' cell phone and you will be 'spared.'" A twisted bobby pin is also lying on the floor; this was missed.; The morgue: There are shards from the chandelier embedded in Geno's head, neck, and back. A gunshot slug is extracted from his abdomen. While the guests go through Geno's clothes, a cell phone suddenly begins to ring in Geno's pants pocket. The guests answer and are startled to hear Giles, who tells them that they must have his missing phone, and asks that they leave it where they found it.; Riddle challenge: The guests are blindfolded and taken to a room in the manor; when allowed to remove their blindfolds, they realize the room is pitch black. Fumbling around in the dark, they eventually find night vision monoculars, which allows them to both read a note on the wall and find an exit tunnel to crawl through. This leads them to portable ultraviolet light wands and a clue that sends them to the morgue, where another clue with kukui nutshell leis are found. Disassembling the leis into individual nutshells and using the ultraviolet light reveals letters written on them, which when rearranged form the phrase "Hear No Evil." This is a clue to the three wise monkeys statues in the library. The "hear no evil" monkey statue provides one final clue that points back to the foyer, where Kam alone finds a drawer containing a gun with a silencer, as well as night vision goggles. Before the guests prepare to state their cases, the killer offers one additional clue: "How exactly did Geno crash my party? Work this answer into your case study; your life depends on it." Solution: In the foyer, the killer had used green fluorescent paint to highlight the Rue Manor crest on the dance floor. A timer was also placed in the socket and was set to short circuit the lights at midnight during the luau. A special kukui nutshell lei was designed for Geno, painted with an invisible fluorescent paint; the killer used the bobby pin to break into Geno's room to both leave the lei on his bed and also to write the note to steal Giles's phone. "Plan A" was for Geno to wear the lei to the luau; once the lights went out, the killer would strangle Geno. Instead, Geno took the note, left the lei behind, and headed to the luau. As instructed, while Giles did the limbo, Geno pocketed Giles' phone (according to the killer, this "dishonesty" gave more reason for the subsequent murder). Moving onto "Plan B," after the lights went out, the killer put on the night vision goggles, and used the silenced gun to fire a contact shot into Geno's stomach, lethally wounding him. Then as planned, the killer dragged Geno to the illuminated crest on the dance floor. This served as a target for the chandelier, which the killer then dropped using the lever hidden behind the curtains. Finally, the killer hid the night vision goggles and gun in a nearby drawer. Best Theory: Lindsey Scared: Melina and Ronnie
| 8 | "Frost Nixin" | August 11, 2013 |
At breakfast the next morning, everyone is once again surprised as both Scared guests Melina and Ronnie have survived the night. Giles informs the guests that the killer has decided to have a spa day, with each guest receiving a different service: Melina, a facial; Kam, a royal massage; Lindsey, a mani-pedi; Cris, a yoga session; and Ronnie, a dip in the hot tub. While everyone else is inside enjoying their treatments, Ronnie is relaxing in the hot tub. Suddenly, an explosion blasts Ronnie out of the hot tub and into the adjacent pool. The remaining guests quickly run outside to find the pool covered in fog, and are there just in time to see Ronnie surface, dead. Killed: Ronnie Investigation: Giles announces that there are four areas to investigate. The guests are given ice picks to dig into a frozen block of ice containing a box with a key; Kam is the first to finish and earns the right to visit the new "mystery area." He is also allowed 3 minutes at any of the other areas and chooses the crime scene. The remaining three guests must each choose a different area, but as they could not come to a decision, the killer had provided Giles cards to randomly assign these areas. The following clues are identified by various guests: The crime scene (the pool): There are chunks of ice floating in both the pool and nearby hot tub, which is only half full. On the ledge by the hot tub is a cup of tea that has apparently been frozen into ice. An unaired clue shows an envelope in the pocket of Ronnie's robe, which had been left beside the pool.; The last known whereabouts (the library): Among the outgoing mail on the desk is a letter Ronnie wrote to Giles revealing who he thought the killer was, but the names in the letter have all been crossed out. Nearby is a tea set with sugar, cream, rice milk, and an unlabeled white powder resembling powdered cream. The teacup is also noted to be missing, with a stirring spoon on a nearby plate. There was also a hidden camera located on the belly of the "see no evil" monkey statue as well as a book about deadly poisons left pulled out on the bookshelf; these clues were missed.; The morgue: Ronnie's body is frozen, yet also has burn marks. There is foam still frothing at Ronnie's mouth. Using a nearby thermometer, he is found to be running a temperature of 105 degrees Fahrenheit.; The mystery area (the attic): Much like in Adrianna's murder, this is simply a small room with a TV displaying security footage. The first scene is in the library, where Ronnie pours himself a cup of tea before sitting down to write a letter. This switches to a second scene at the hot tub, where Ronnie is relaxing before he appears to have fallen asleep. A final scene catches him being blasted out of the hot tub.; Riddle challenge: Giles starts the riddle off with a science experiment - he drops a canister into a contraption that then blasts ping pong balls everywhere. The guests each find a ping pong ball that says "Kitchen" and head there for the next clue. There are barrels of castor beans for each of the guests, with a clue telling them to dig to find a small cylinder hidden inside. Opening this reveals a word search, and the guests are only allowed to visit areas they find hidden in the puzzle. One of the phrases is "pool equipment," and going to the area where pool equipment is stored, Kam is the first to find an orange tank of liquid nitrogen hooked up to the hot tub water supply, with a timer on it. Solution: The killer had noticed that Ronnie liked to add powdered cream to his tea. Seeing through the hidden camera that Ronnie had gone to the library to write a letter to Giles, the killer sent a maid to deliver a tea set, including powdered cream spiked with ricin, a poison that can be extracted from the castor bean. After Ronnie left, the killer found the letter and scratched out all the names on it. Ronnie brought his poisoned tea with him to the hot tub, and when he turned on the jets, he unknowingly started the timer on the liquid nitrogen tank that the killer had previously hooked up to the hot tub water supply. The heated water from the hot tub magnified the effects of the ricin, heating Ronnie's body to a lethal temperature. Once the timer went off, the liquid nitrogen entered the hot tub and reacted violently, blasting Ronnie's body into the pool and burning his skin, while at the same time instantly freezing the hot tub water, leaving chunks of ice floating alongside him. Best Theory: Kam Scared: Lindsey and Melina
| 9 | "Golden Cuffs" | August 18, 2013 |
Yet again, all of the guests survive the night, and Giles informs them that the killer has provided them with a limo ride away from Rue Manor. The guests celebrate and open presents containing champagne flutes. They toast to finally making it out of Rue Manor, when suddenly, the driver makes a sharp U-turn and takes them back to the manor. They hurry in to discover a large TV has been placed in the foyer. When it turns on, the guests are shocked to see Giles tied up and surrounded by guns; he informs them that he has been kidnapped. Giles has been hidden away somewhere in the manor and pleads for the guests to find him quickly, for his life is on the line. He also warns them that failure to solve the upcoming crime will result in them all meeting a similar fate. Thick white smoke begins to pour into the foyer, and in the confusion, the other guests gradually realize that Melina has disappeared. Riddle challenge: Speaking on the TV screen through voice masking software, the killer relays a riddle to the surviving guests, challenging them to find Melina. The riddle asks the guests to recall the code used to open the storage bin in Sheri's death; there are several clues to this combination in the lounge. After figuring out the code, Kam notices a locked door behind partially opened curtains in the foyer and uses the code to solve the riddle. The wall revolves, opening up a room full of artifacts from all of the previous murders. At the far end of the room, they find Melina strangled to death with the rigged kukui necklace from Geno's murder (the original "Plan A"). Kam receives a puzzle piece, giving him an advantage in the final challenge. Killed: Melina Final challenge: The killer presents the final three guests with a multi-part riddle challenge, in which they have to solve riddles related to the previous murders with the help of the "reanimated bodies" of the previous guests. Depending on their answer, guests receive one of two jigsaw puzzle pieces to fit into each of their own large question mark-shaped boards in the foyer. Puzzle pieces received from riddles answered correctly would light up under a black light, while riddles answered incorrectly would result in puzzle pieces that would remain dark under the black light. Guests then return to the incorrectly answered riddles and try again. Briefly, the riddles are: Skill: Sheri's riddle requires guests to use a slingshot to strike one of two aquariums, one containing a picture of Sheri facing forward and the other, backward. Picking the aquarium with the picture showing which direction Sheri faced when the killer struck her resulted in a correct puzzle piece. While all three guests identified the correct fish tank, each of them required multiple attempts to break it.; Memory: Dontae's riddle simply asks guests to pick the correct saint on the necklace he received the night of his death, St. Agatha or St. Elmo. Kam's advantage in this final challenge was that he could skip this riddle.; Tactile: Adrianna's riddle instructs guests to rebuild the bomb that was used as a prop in the riddle challenge for her murder, and then to cut the wire whose color corresponded to the color of the letters of the message that she received in the breakfast nook.; Logic: Don's riddle prompts guests to put in order the steps to get Kona, the cougar, into its hiding place. Kam is noted to have missed this several times.; Excavation: Ulysses' riddle asks guests to find the scarlet kingsnake in the nearby bush and to drop it in the wooden basket.; Perception: Sasha and Dana's riddle in the theater shows guests two images with several minor differences; guests have to correctly identify how many differences there are to receive the correct puzzle piece. Both Lindsey and Cris missed this on their first try.; Sensory Deprivation: Geno's riddle has guests enter a pitch black room with a chest, which contains four items - night vision goggles, a gun, a kukui necklace, and a lei. Bringing the item that was not a part of Geno's murder nets a correct puzzle piece. Cris is seen to have initially incorrectly picked a gun.; Evidence: Ronnie's riddle tells guests to find a castor bean among the many different beans in a hot tub.; Instinct: Guests run to the attic to "find the killer" - and find Giles, untangled from his ropes. He claims the killer put him up to this, and asks guests to find his contract downstairs, read the fine print, and tell him whether or not he is the killer. Kam got this wrong at first.; Kam is the first to finish the challenge, and Cris finishes shortly thereafter; both receive a riddle that directs them to a room upstairs to find the killer. Lindsey, the last to finish, is instead directed to the room where they earlier had found Melina. The Killer Unmasked: Upstairs, Kam and Cris find themselves in a room filled with photographs of the murders along with video monitors showing live surveillance footage around Rue Manor. They begin to search frantically for what they believe is the final riddle that will reveal who the killer is, when all of a sudden, the monitor switches to a camera showing Lindsey entering the room from the foyer. Lindsey steps in and is distracted by the revolving door spinning behind her, not noticing the suit of armor poised to fire in front of her. Having set the trap off, Lindsey receives an arrow to her throat as her "prize" for being runner-up. Killed: Lindsey Stunned, Kam suddenly realizes that Cris is the killer, who menacingly gives one final rhyme: "I won't be played by your foolish game. The killer could be you...or me just the same. Enough of the riddles, the ruckus, the rhymes. I committed those murders, eleven straight times. It is true, I am the real sinner. Congratulations, Kam, you are the winner." The Killer: Cris Giles enters the room and gives Kam golden handcuffs to arrest Cris, who willingly is taken away by the police (incidentally played by the two executive producers, Zuiker and Abrego), her sadistic game over. Giles awards Kam his prize and walks him out. On his way out of the mansion, Kam is greeted by the previously eliminated guests, who have been allowed to break character as they see him off, most congratulating him on his victory. Giles offers to drive him wherever he wishes to go, to which Kam answers "Home". Winner: Kam In a post-show interview, it was revealed that the guests did not actually perform the final challenge simultaneously, as it would've been unfair if one guest was forced to wait while another guest was completing a station. Instead, each guest was timed individually, and in the end, Kam finished 44 seconds faster than Lindsey.

== Reception ==
=== Critical reception ===
Whodunnit? received generally mixed reviews from critics.

The series received 43 out of 100 at Metacritic.

Variety's Brian Lowry thought that the show was "especially brain-numbing", as the mysteries weren't suspenseful or intriguing. Mary McNamara of the Los Angeles Times said that it was "not terribly exciting" and that the premiere episode "didn't leave enough time for at-home deduction or competitive theories." Allison Keene of The Hollywood Reporter thought that the series generally ended up "either painful or unintentionally funny". She found the show to be a little pathetic, because "of how little amateurs really know and how ridiculous it sounds to regurgitate half-remembered forensic jargon".

=== Ratings ===
Whodunnit premiered to a 1.3 rating in the Adults 18-49 demographic and 4.05 million viewers. Ratings analysts viewed this result as soft, but still decent. In week two, however, it fell 23% to a 1.0 rating. It stayed near that point until the end of the season, when it finished with a season-high rating of 1.4.

| No. | Airdate | 18-49 (Rating/Share) | Viewers (millions) | Source |
|---|---|---|---|---|
| 1 | June 23, 2013 | 1.3/4 | 4.05 | |
| 2 | June 30, 2013 | 1.0/3 | 3.20 | |
| 3 | July 7, 2013 | 1.0/3 | 3.00 | |
| 4 | July 14, 2013 | 1.1/3 | 3.12 | |
| 5 | July 21, 2013 | 1.0/3 | 2.96 | |
| 6 | July 28, 2013 | 1.1/3 | 3.04 | |
| 7 | August 4, 2013 | 1.0/3 | 2.99 | |
| 8 | August 11, 2013 | 1.1/3 | 3.22 | |
| 9 | August 18, 2013 | 1.4/4 | 3.67 | |

=== Confusion over murders of guests ===
After the first episode aired, some audience members at home were confused about whether the murders were actually real. On the official website, the series' producers reveal fun facts about each episode, describing in more detail how the staged murder scenes were shot. In addition, viewers can watch exit interviews with the eliminated guests. Beginning with the second episode, each episode has ended with that week's "victim" (the guest eliminated the previous week), still in makeup and costume, humorously commenting on what it was like to play the role of the killer's victim. Executive producer Zuiker confirmed that this was added in post-production in response to the unexpected confusion in order to reemphasize the fictitious nature of the premise. The opening narration of the final episode reiterated that the contestants were solving "fictitious crimes," and even explicitly mentioned the confusion.

== Companion books ==
A companion book series, also titled Whodunnit?, is available in digital format. It is written by Anthony Zuiker and published by Hyperion Books. The first book, Whodunnit?: Murder in Mystery Manor was released on June 16, 2013. A second book, Whodunnit?: Murder on Mystery Island was released on August 27, 2013.

The series is a fictitious season of the events happening in the television show, with Giles, as the main character. It is stated in the books that whenever he gets a job, it will turn out to ultimately (whether the job is "Hijacked" or not) be for an extremely rich, yet utterly psychopathic serial killer wishing to enact another "Season", trapping him in the location where he currently works, and forcing him to host on his/her behalf, lest they kill him and or any other staff members that refuse to go along with the deadly game they have set up.

== See also ==
- Murder in Small Town X
- Escape the Night
- The Mole
- The Traitors
- 13: Fear Is Real
- Killer Camp
