= You (2009 film) =

- Film poster
- Directed by: Melora Hardin
- Written by: Gildart Jackson
- Produced by: Gildart Jackson; Melora Hardin
- Starring: Melora Hardin; Gildart Jackson; Brenda Strong; Allison Mack; Amy Pietz; Jerry Hardin; Don Michael Paul; Joely Fisher
- Cinematography: Kev Robertson
- Edited by: Jason Schmid
- Music by: Tim Burlingame
- Production company: Dancing Moon Productions
- Release date: May 8, 2009
- Running time: 84 minutes
- Country: United States
- Language: English

You is a 2009 American drama film directed by and starring Melora Hardin (in her directorial debut). The film also stars Gildart Jackson (who also wrote the film), Brenda Strong, Allison Mack, Amy Pietz, Jerry Hardin, Don Michael Paul, and Joely Fisher.

== Plot ==
Husband and wife Rawdon and Miranda are soulmates. Their love for each other is palpable as they lie in bed treasuring their 6 month old daughter Quincey. Miranda fantasizes about the speech she plans to make when, one day in their future, she will give this tiny infant away at her wedding.

Tragically, when Quincey is 3, Miranda is killed in a car accident and Rawdon is left alone, unmoored, to continue life without the love of his life.

Staying as strong as he can Rawdon takes Quincey to the roof of a skyscraper and explains that Mommy is now an angel. It is up here that for the first time they see a vision of Miranda as an angel.

Rawdon continues to see visions of her. Initially these visions help him—at home she gives him advice about parenting; in Portugal she softens his hardness; when he hides in the closet to isolate himself she snaps some sense into him and insists that Rawdon keep her mother, father and brother—Quincey's grandparents and Uncle Jack – firmly in Quincey's life.

Rawdon explains these visions to his therapist Paula as she helps him with the long grieving process and over a period of years, with Quincey growing before our eyes, Rawdon tries to move on with his life.

He tries to date other women. Disastrously. He falls instantly in love with Sam who ends up becoming his good friend and a surrogate Aunt to Quincey. He dates a woman named Kimberly who Quincey wisely suggests is far better suited to her Uncle Jack. And she is right. When Jack and Kimberly get married, Rawdon is their best man.

All the while Miranda's metaphysical presence is with him. He goes from needing her, to blaming her, to being angry at her. But for a long, long time he won't let her go away. Part of him wants her to stay alive in his imagination forever and gradually this presence that helped him initially becomes an impediment to his moving on with life.

In contrast to her Dad's stagnation, Quincey is growing up fast, and in no time she is dating, stealing cars, trying to set her Dad up with her best friend's divorced Moms, going off to University and falling in love with a Frenchman named Philippe.

It is not until Rawdon finally plucks up the courage to ask out somebody who might just be right for him that he finally, tearfully, asks Miranda to leave him.

This is ultimately a coming of age story. We watch Quincey literally come of age whilst her father, emotionally, comes of age. He eventually gives up the now stultifying memory of his dead wife and arrives at a new beginning.

The end of this story is also the beginning of another where Rawdon, surrounded by the people he loves—but without Miranda—finds himself giving Quincey away at her wedding to Philippe. And here he makes the speech that Miranda made in bed with him and Quincey so many years before.

== Cast ==
- Melora Hardin as Miranda
- Gildart Jackson as Rawdon
- Brenda Strong as Paula
- Allison Mack as Quincey
  - Kristi Lauren as Young Quincey
- Amy Pietz as Sam
- Jerry Hardin as Rex
- Don Michael Paul as Jack
- Joely Fisher as Kimberly
