= Frank Converse =

American actor (born 1938)

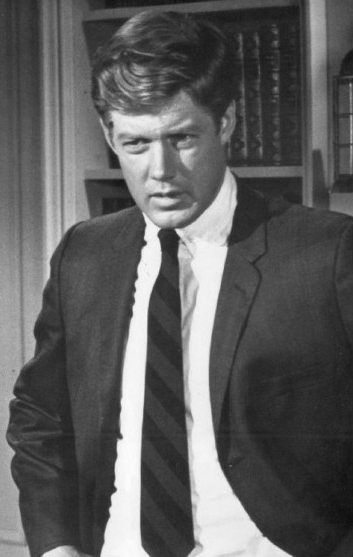
- Converse as Johnny Corso in N.Y.P.D., 1968
- Born: May 22, 1938 (age 88); St. Louis, Missouri, U.S.
- Years active: 1960s-2012
- Spouse(s): Maureen Anderman (1982–present); 2 children Carol Tawser (divorced); 2 children

Frank Converse (born May 22, 1938) is an American actor.

== Early life ==
Converse was born in 1938 in St. Louis, Missouri. In 1962, he received a Bachelor of Fine Arts in drama at Carnegie Institute of Technology (now Carnegie Mellon University) in Pittsburgh, Pennsylvania.

== Career ==
On Broadway, he starred in The Philadelphia Story (1980), Design for Living (1984), A Streetcar Named Desire (1988), and Lady in the Dark (1994). Off-Broadway, he starred in The House of Blue Leaves (1971) and South Pacific. In 2007, he appeared at the Hartford Stage in Thornton Wilder's Our Town with Hal Holbrook. Converse also did television commercials for Black & Decker in the late 1980s.

Converse was the star of five television series: Coronet Blue, N.Y.P.D. (not to be confused with NYPD Blue), Movin' On, The Family Tree, and Dolphin Cove. He played Harry O'Neill on One Life to Live and Ned Simon on As the World Turns, and he had a brief role in All My Children. He appeared opposite Bing Crosby in the 1971 TV movie thriller Dr. Cook's Garden and played Morgan Harris in Anne of Green Gables: The Sequel (also known as Anne of Avonlea). He starred in the Tales of the Unexpected as Jack in "Bird of Prey" (1984, series 7, episode 10). He also played Bill Davenport on an episode of Law & Order: Criminal Intent titled "Tomorrow".

His film career included roles in Hurry Sundown (1967), Hour of the Gun (1967, as Virgil Earp), The Rowdyman (1972), Killer on Board (1977), Cruise Into Terror (1978), The Pilot (1980), The Bushido Blade (1981), Spring Fever (1982), Solarbabies (1986), Everybody Wins (1990) and Primary Motive (1992). He also guested on such popular 1970s shows as The Mod Squad, Medical Center, Police Story, Rhoda, The Love Boat, Baa Baa Black Sheep and The Bionic Woman.

== Personal life ==
Divorced from Carol Tauser, then Astrid Ronning, he is currently married to actress Maureen Anderman.

== Filmography ==
Frank Converse film and television credits
Year	Title	Role	Notes
1967	Hurry Sundown	Rev. Clem De Lavery	Film
1967	Hour of the Gun	Virgil Earp	Film
1967	Coronet Blue	Michael Alden	1 season - 13 episodes
1967-69	N.Y.P.D.	Detective Johnny Corso	49 episodes
1970	The Mod Squad	Warren Loring	Episode: "Should Auld Acquaintance Be Forgot"
1970	The Young Rebels	Robert Larkin	Episode: "Father and I Went Down to Camp"
1970	The Young Lawyers	Dr. Vince Sabowski	Episode: "Is There a Good Samaritan in the House?"
1970	Medical Center	Pete Barris	Episode: "Trial by Terror"
1971	Dr. Cook's Garden	Jimmy Tennyson	ABC Movie of the Week
1971	A Tattered Web	Steve Butler	TV movie
1972	Alias Smith and Jones	Chris Truitt	Episode: "Bushwack!"
1972	The Rowdyman	Andrew Scott	Film
1973	The Starlost	Dr. Gerald W. Aaron	Episode: "Lazarus from the Mist"
1973	Columbo	Mr. Fallon	Episode: "Requiem for a Falling Star"
1974–76	Movin' On	Will Chandler	45 episodes
1977	Killer on Board	Dr. Paul	TV movie
1977	Rhoda	Sam Ellis	Episode: "The Second Time Around"
1978	The Love Boat	Bill Thompson	Season 1 episode 17:“The Last of the Stubings/The Million Dollar Man/The Sisters"
1978	Black Sheep Squadron	Major Burton Cannon	Episode: "Hotshot"
1978	The Bionic Woman	Jed Kimball	Episode: "Deadly Music"
1978	Cruise Into Terror	Matt Lazarus	TV movie
1979	The Bushido Blade	Captain Lawrence Hawk	Film
1980	The Pilot	Jim Cochran	Film
1981	Time Bandits	Dim	Film
1981	Fantasy Island	Tony Edwards	Episode: "Romance Times Three/Night of the Tormented Soul"
1982	Spring Fever	Lewis Berryman	Film
1983	The Family Tree	Kevin Nichols	1 season - 6 episodes
1984	Tales of the Unexpected	Jack	Episode: "Bird of Prey"
1984-87	One Life to Live	Harry O'Neill	8 episodes
1985	Magnum, P.I.	Sam Henderson	Episode: "The Kona Winds"
1985	The Equalizer	Guthrie Browne	Episode: "Back Home"
1986	Hotel	John Dunson	Episode: "Hearts Divided"
1986	Solarbabies	Greentree	Film
1987	Anne of Avonlea	Morgan Harris	TV miniseries
1989	Dolphin Cove	Michael Larson	1 season - 8 episodes
1990	Everybody Wins	Charley Haggerty	Film
1991–2008	Law & Order	(various)	5 episodes
1992	Primary Motive	John Eastham	Film
1992-93	As the World Turns	Ned Simon	9 episodes
1995	Murder, She Wrote	Everett Buffum	Episode: "The Dream Team"
1998	The Practice	Dr. Jordan	2 episodes
2002	Law & Order: Criminal Intent	Bill Davenport	Episode: "Tomorrow"
