= ...And Jesus Moonwalks the Mississippi =

2010 play by Marcus Gardley

- Written by: Marcus Gardley
- Subject: Reimagining of the Greek myth of Persephone and Demeter
- Setting: Banks of the Mississippi River during the Civil War

Premiere

...And Jesus Moonwalks the Mississippi is a 2004 play by Marcus Gardley. The play is a re-imagining of the Greek myth of Persephone and Demeter.

== Plot ==
...And Jesus Moonwalks the Mississippi is set on the banks of the Mississippi River during the Civil War. A lynched African-American man named Damascus is immediately resurrected as a woman named Demeter, who only has three days to find her daughter Po'em and transmit her song before she has to return to death.

== Characters ==
=== The Quilter ===
- Miss Ssippi is a beautifully large, black woman. She gives new meaning to the word elegance, although she appears over-worked and always on the run.

=== The Threads ===
- Free Girl is ten, half black and half white. Her face is caked in white powder and her hair is always tied up. She wears a tea dress.
- Blanche Verse or Blanchie is also ten and white. She wears short pants and an old army vest, which hangs loosely on her.
- Cadence Marie Verse is Blanche's mother. She is white and old enough to be embarrassed by her age. She is always dolled up: blush on the cheeks, rouge on the lips and gin on the tongue.
- Jean Verse is a thin, white romantic. He wears a white silk shirt, Confederate slacks and a dark fedora. His voice is like the wind; it caters to the trees.
- Demeter is old enough to die wise. She is black, with silver her hair and smooth skin. She is built like a good man, one who's been fighting all her life. She wears a tattered petticoat, ripped slacks and a headscarf. Damascus is her former being.
- Yankee Pot Roast is juicy, with much fat hanging off him. He is white and red all over.
- Jesus is black, a warm beauty. He wears sandals and a robe. The actor that plays him also plays The Great Tree.
- Brer Rabit is the House Negro.

== Influence ==
The play is based on the story of Persephone and her mother, the goddess of the harvest Demeter.
