= Cover Me (American TV series) =

- Also known as: Cover Me: Based on the True Life of an FBI Family
- Genre: Comedy drama
- Created by: Shaun Cassidy
- Starring: Peter Dobson; Melora Hardin; Cameron Richardson; Antoinette Picatto; Michael Angarano
- Composer: Jon Ehrlich
- Country of origin: United States
- Original language: English
- No. of seasons: 1
- No. of episodes: 25

Production
- Executive producer: Shaun Cassidy
- Producer: Jim Michaels
- Camera setup: Single-camera
- Running time: 60 minutes
- Production companies: Shaun Cassidy Productions; Studios USA Television

Original release
- Network: USA
- Release: March 5, 2000 – March 24, 2001

Cover Me (also known as Cover Me: Based on the True Life of an FBI Family) is an American crime comedy-drama series which ran on the USA Network from March 5, 2000, to March 24, 2001.

== Premise ==
Based on a real family, the series centers on undercover FBI agent Danny Arno, who instead of hiding the details of his work from his wife and children, includes them in his operations.

== Cast ==
- Peter Dobson as Danny Arno
- Melora Hardin as Barbara Arno, Danny's wife
- Cameron Richardson as Celeste Arno, Danny & Barbara's first daughter
- Antoinette Picatto as Ruby Arno, Danny & Barbara's second daughter
- Michael Angarano as Chance Arno, Danny & Barbara's son

David Faustino had the roles of Older Chance and Narrator, but the roles are said to be uncredited.

== Episodes ==
No.	Title	Directed by	Written by	Original release date
1	"Just Act Normal"	Michael Nankin	Shaun Cassidy	March 5, 2000
2	"The Line"	Tony Dow	Mark Saraceni & Shaun Cassidy	March 12, 2000
3	"Domestic Terrorism"	Lee Bonner	Philip Gerson	March 19, 2000
4	"Where Have You Gone, Sandy Koufax?"	Tony Dow	Scott Williams	April 2, 2000
5	"Perfect Frank"	Tony Dow	Scott Williams & Mark Saraceni & Shaun Cassidy	April 9, 2000
6	"Beauty Marks"	Michael Nankin	Story by : Gary Glasberg; Teleplay by : Scott Williams & Mark Saraceni	April 16, 2000
7	"Our Ms. Brooks"	Michael Nankin	Shaun Cassidy	April 23, 2000
8	"The Fever Flip"	Michael Nankin	Story by : Shaun Cassidy & Michael Nankin; Teleplay by : Shaun Cassidy	July 26, 2000
9	"Turtle Soup"	Philip Sgriccia	Story by : Joanne Waters and Mark Saraceni; Teleplay by : Joanne Waters	August 2, 2000
10	"F.B.I.V."	Stephen Cragg	Neena Beber	August 9, 2000
11	"Bazooka Joe"	Lee Bonner	Mark Saraceni and Shaun Cassidy	August 16, 2000
12	"The Book of Danny"	Philip Sgriccia	Dan E. Fesman & Harry Victor	August 23, 2000
13	"In Plain Sight"	Alan Myerson	Tony Phelan & Joan Rater	September 13, 2000
14	"Killing Me Softly"	Lee Bonner	Michael Angeli	September 20, 2000
15	"The Hit Parade"	Timothy Busfield	Harry Victor & Dan E. Fesman	September 27, 2000
16	"Absolution"	P. J. Pesce	Michael Angeli	January 7, 2001
17	"Vegas Mother's Day: Part 1"	Philip Sgriccia	Story by : Shaun Cassidy & Ted Shuttleworth; Teleplay by : Shaun Cassidy	January 14, 2001
18	"Vegas Mother's Day: Part 2"	Chris Long	Shaun Cassidy	January 14, 2001
19	"Borderline Normal"	Sanford Bookstaver	Chip Johannessen	February 4, 2001
20	"Sting Like a Bee"	Unknown	Dan E. Fesman & Harry Victor	February 11, 2001
21	"Home for the Holidays"	Timothy Busfield	Michael Angeli	February 18, 2001
22	"The River"	Sanford Bookstaver	Joan Rater & Tony Phelan	February 25, 2001
23	"RashoMom"	Adam Davidson	Story by : Patricia Wells and Harry Victor & Dan E. Fesman; Teleplay by : Harry Victor & Dan E. Fesman	March 4, 2001
24	"Sub-Zero"	Eric Bross	Laurie McCarthy	March 17, 2001
25	"Viva Zapatos"	Philip Sgriccia	Tony Phelan & Joan Rater	March 24, 2001
