= Marcus Gardley =

American dramatist, poet and screenwriter (born 1977/1978)

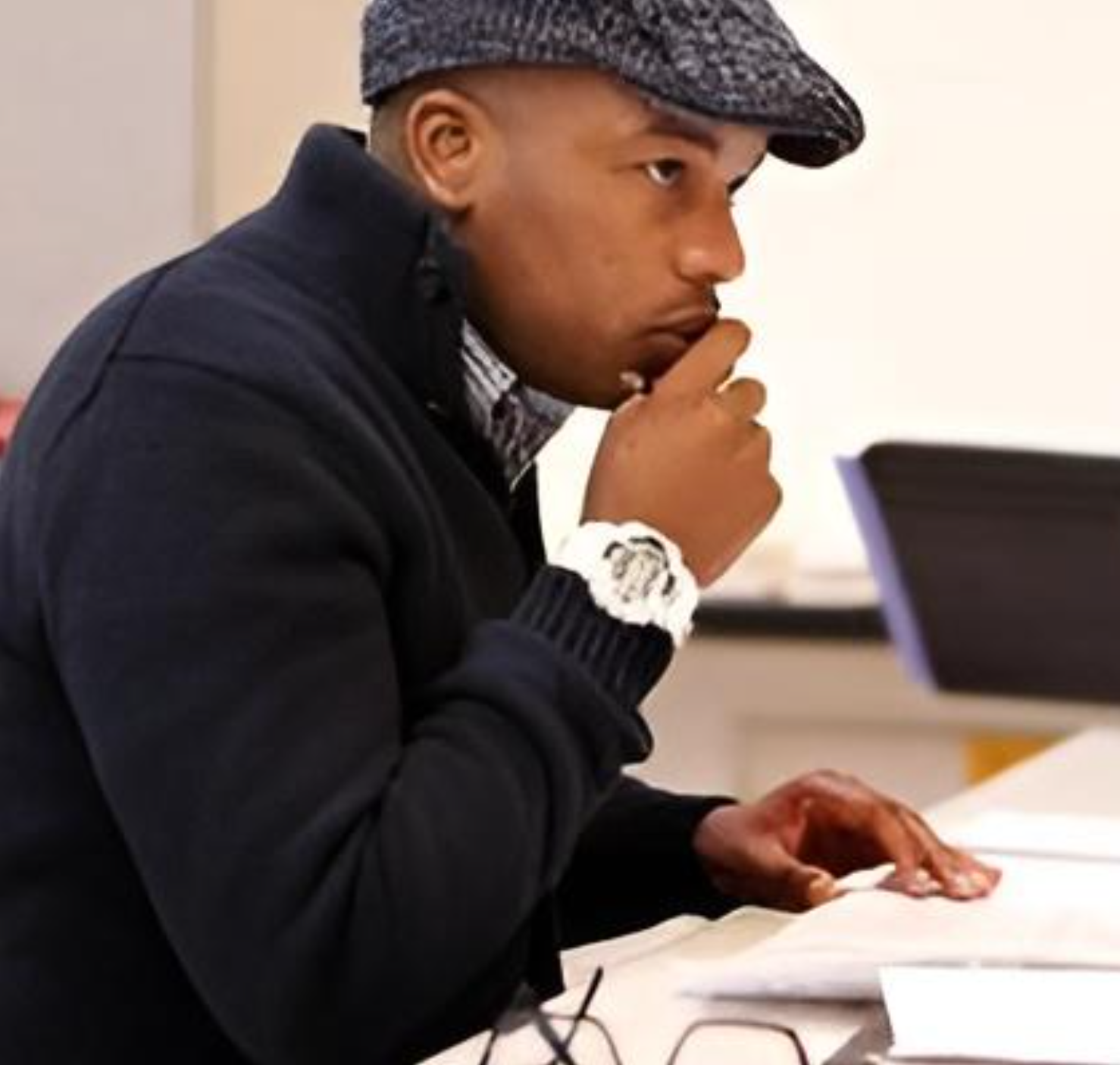
- Born: Oakland, California, U.S.
- Education: San Francisco State University (BFA); Yale University (MFA)
- Occupations: Poet, playwright, TV writer, screenwriter, co-chair of playwriting at the David Geffen School of Drama at Yale University

Marcus Gardley (born 1977) is an African American poet, playwright, TV writer, and screenwriter from West Oakland, California. He is currently the co-chair of playwriting at the David Geffen School of Drama at Yale University.

Gardley is among a new group of young African-American playwrights who have come to prominence during the "Age of Obama." He has cited the Harlem art scene as influential to his work, with James Baldwin as a primary inspiration.

The New Yorker described Gardley in 2010 as the "heir to Federico Garcia Lorca, Pirandello and Tennessee Williams."

== Early life and education ==
Gardley was born and raised in Oakland, California. The son of a nurse and a minister, he describes growing up in a home surrounded by books, ultimately leading him toward his academic path, at first wanting to become an anesthesiologist. Gardley originally studied and wrote poetry at San Francisco State University (SFSU), though his poetry professors told him that his poems read like plays. Initially not wanting to admit this, Gardley eventually came around to acknowledge that his poems often did incorporate elements of playwriting. Regarding this time, Gardley later recalled: "What I like about theater is it's like an orchestra. There are these different sounds from different people. I think of my plays as compositions in a way." Gardley earned the SFSU African American Student of Outstanding Achievement Award for 2000–1 and graduated with his B.F.A. He went on to earn his M.F.A. in playwriting from Yale School of Drama in 2004. Upon graduation, Gardley started teaching creative writing at Columbia University.

He was previously a member of New Dramatists, The Dramatists Guild, and the Lark Play Development Center.

In 2013, Gardley began a three-year term as the Playwright in Residence at Victory Gardens Theater, through the National Playwright Residency Program, funded by the Andrew W. Mellon Foundation and administered by HowlRound. It was renewed in 2016 for another three years.

== Theater ==
=== Plays ===
==== The House that will not Stand ====
The House that will not Stand was commissioned by Berkeley Repertory Theatre and Yale Repertory Theatre, and had productions in both spaces in January 2014, directed by Patricia McGregor. It subsequently premiered in London at the Tricycle Theatre in 2014 to rave reviews, a sold-out run, and two extensions, directed by Indhu Rubasingham. It was the most celebrated play in London at the time for a small theater. It then had an Off-Broadway premiere at New York Theatre Workshop in July 2018, directed by Lileana Blain-Cruz. It won the Obie Award in 2019 and the AUDELCO Award for Best Play. The play centers on a Creole woman in the early 1800s who, recently widowed, must contend with the possibility of losing her daughters and her home. Even though she is one of the wealthiest women in New Orleans, she loses the little freedom she has when the United States purchases the Louisiana territories from France. The work utilizes dark humor and stylized melodrama to tell the story of female sexuality agency and race relations.

==== …And Jesus Moonwalks the Mississippi ====
...And Jesus Moonwalks the Mississippi had a workshop production at the Sundance Theater Laboratory in 2006, directed by Matt August. It was then produced at The Cutting Ball Theater in 2010, directed by Amy Mueller, and earned both positive reviews and two sold-out extensions. It was rated as one of the top ten plays in the Bay Area. It had a workshop production at The Public Theater, directed by Robert O'Hara and starring Colman Domingo. The show is a poetic voyage of forgiveness and redemption, highly influenced by the myth of Demeter and Persephone, that encompasses traditional storytelling, gospel music, and humor to create a rich and vividly imaginative world.

==== black odyssey ====
In 2014, black odyssey was commissioned by the Denver Center Theater Company, where it premiered in 2017, directed by Chay Yew, with musical composition by Jaret Landon. It was revised for production at California Shakespeare Theater, where it was reset in Oakland, directed by Eric Ting, and included new musical composition by Linda Tillery and Molly Holm. The production was so successful it was mounted again the following year. It garnered 11 nominations and seven Theatre Bay Area Awards, including: Outstanding Production, Outstanding Ensemble, Outstanding Male Actor (Aldo Billingslea), Outstanding Female Actor (Margo Hall), Outstanding Direction (Eric Ting), Outstanding Costume Design (Dede Ayite), and the Creative Specialties Award. The third production took place in Boston as a co-production between The Front Porch Arts Collective & Underground Railway Theater in 2019, directed by Benny Sato Ambush. In 2023, the fourth presentation of the play, directed by Stevie Walker-Webb and with music composition by Linda Tillery and Molly Holm, occurred at Classic Stage Company in New York City. It was revised to take place in Harlem. It was nominated for the 2023 Drama Desk Award for Outstanding Adaptation. The next production of the play occurred in Memphis, Tennessee, at the Hattiloo Theatre, directed by Ekundayo Bandele & Maya Robinson. The play is about Ulysses Lincoln, a War veteran lost at sea and presumed dead, fighting to find his way back home to his wife and son. The meddlesome Gods, Deus and Paw Sidin have other plans in mind as they battle for control of Ulysses’ fate.

==== every tongue confess ====
every tongue confess was commissioned and produced at The Arena Stage in 2011. The first play ever produced in their new theater, the Kogod Cradle, was directed by Kenny Leon and starred Phylicia Rashad. The successful run sold out. The show takes place in Boligee, Alabama, where the temperature is rising, hailstones are falling, ghosts are walking among the living, and someone is setting black churches on fire. As one church burns to the ground, the parishioners trapped inside tell tales spanning generations that may unravel the mystery of who is behind the arsons. It blends lending folklore, magic, and real American history, in an epic fantasia that probes the line between redemption and damnation.

==== The Gospel of Lovingkindness ====
The Gospel of Lovingkindess was produced in Chicago at Victory Gardens Theater in 2014, directed by Chay Yew. It won Best Play at the African American Arts Alliance of Chicago. It was sold out and extended twice. It had a subsequent production in Washington, D.C. at the Mosaic Theatre in 2015, directed by Jennifer L. Nelson. It is a hymn-and-hip-hop-tinged elegy, set on the South Side of Chicago in a time of rising gun violence in a cosmopolitan, yet divided, city. The play tells the story of Manny, a 17-year-old who sings for President Obama at the White House only to be held up weeks later for his Air Jordan sneakers. Manny's mother retraces the trajectory of her son's fateful encounter with Noel, a fellow teenager with heartbreaking setbacks of his own, as she conjures the ghost of Ida B. Wells, the Civil Rights activist, now 153 years old, who offers a challenging perspective for the family and our community.

==== An Issue of Blood ====
An Issue of Blood was produced at Victory Gardens Theater in 2015, directed by Chay Yew. It opened to critical acclaim. The show takes place in 1676 in Virginia – a time when class, not color, defined an American’s destiny. Historic figure and wealthy landowner Negro Mary believes a vile curse has been cast upon her family and land. But her plans to break the curse are thwarted by a secret wedding, an interracial love triangle, and a crime of passion.

==== No More Monsters Here ====
In 2013, Gardley contributed this short play to The New Black Fest as part of a collaborative project titled Facing Our Truth: 10-Minute Plays on Trayvon, Race and Privilege, premiering in New York City. The piece features a black psychiatrist who prescribes that a white woman live as a black man for three days as a cure for her "negroidphobia."

==== On the Levee ====
On the Levee was produced at Lincoln Center (LCT3) in 2010, directed by Lear deBessonet and with set design by Kara Walker. It was nominated for 11 AUDELCO Awards. Based on a true story, this play with music revisits the Greenville, Mississippi flood of 1927, the worst in U.S. history before Hurricane Katrina. At the heart of the story are two fathers (a white cotton farmer and an African-American bootblack) and their sons.

==== the road weeps, the well runs dry ====
the road weeps, the well runs dry had a national tour in 2012 and 2013, produced by the Lark Play Development Center, with a grant from the Mellon Foundation. The tour started in Juneau, Alaska at the Perseverance Theatre, directed by Aaron Davidman. It was then at the Pilsbury House Theatre, in Minneapolis, Minnesota, directed by Marion McClinton. It then was in Tampa Bay, Florida, at the University of South Florida School of Theater and Dance, directed by Fanni Green. The final production was in Los Angeles at The Los Angeles Theatre Center, directed by Shirley Jo Finney. The play is part of a trilogy about the migration of a mixed tribe of African American and Seminole people in Florida.

==== This World in a Woman’s Hands ====
This World in a Woman’s Hands was a commission and production made possible by The Wallace Alexander Gerbode Foundation and The William and Flora Hewlett Foundation Emerging Playwrights 2006 initiative, produced in the Bay Area at Shotgun Players, directed by Patrick Dooley and with music composition by Linda Tillery and Molly Holm. It was a critical success. This is a play with music that details women of color building warships in the Richmond Shipyards during WWII.

==== A Thousand Ships ====
A Thousand Ships was commissioned by the Hewlett Foundation and had its world premiere at Oakland Theater Project. It was directed by Michael Socrates Moran and included an original music composition by Molly Holm. The show is an extraordinary tale of friendship between two black women and their families, from their wartime work in the Oakland shipyards to the fulfillment of a dream: their own hair salon.

==== A Wolf in Snakeskin Shoes ====
A Wolf in Snakeskin Shoes was commissioned and produced in London at the Tricycle Theater in 2015, directed by Indhu Rubasingham. It had a staged reading in New York City, produced by The Acting Company in 2021, directed by Ian Belknap. The play is an adaptation of Molière's Tartuffe. It is written in verse and is a play with music that showcases original gospel songs. The setting is a mega-church in modern-day Atlanta, Georgia. Given just days to live, multi-millionaire Archibald Organdy puts his faith in the flamboyant Archbishop Tardimus Toof, a prophet, preacher and part-time masseur who arrives from the deep, deep south. Toof promises to absolve Archibald’s sins and heal his disease, but his family suspects there’s more to this healer than faith, virtue, and snakeskin shoes.

==== A Wonder in my Soul ====
A Wonder in my Soul was produced at Victory Gardens Theater in 2017, directed by Chay Yew. It had an extended run and was a critical success. It had a subsequent production at Baltimore Center Stage in 2018, directed by Daniel Bryant. Sold out and extended twice. The show is about two longtime hair salon owners, Bell and Birdie, who grapple with the decision of whether to remain in their beloved South side neighborhood or relocate under the pressures of gentrification and crime. Told through music, poetry, and dance, the show looks at one neighborhood’s evolution through the eyes of two best friends and their lifetime of friendship.

==== X: Or, Betty Shabazz v. The Nation ====
X: Or, Betty Shabazz v. The Nation was commissioned by The Acting Company in 2018, and had a national tour, directed by Ian Belknap. It was then produced in New York City, Off-Broadway, at Theatre At St Clements, where it was produced by Malcolm X’s daughter, Ilyasah Shabazz. The play opened to rave reviews, was nominated for 2 AUDELCO Awards, and was a New York Times Critic Pick. Shakespeare’s Julius Caesar provides a framework for Gardley to deepen our understanding of one of America’s most complex, compelling historical figures and explore the tumultuous landscape of ideology and activism in the 1960s.

=== In development ===
==== Basquiat ====
The Broadway-bound musical is based on the life of the late artist, Jean-Michel Basquiat. John Legend is set to compose the music and Kamilah Forbes is set to direct. Alan D. Marks and Barbara Marks are attached to produce, along Universal Music Group and Basquiat's sisters, Lisane Basquiat and Jeanine Basquiat.

==== The Pursuit of Happyness ====
This new musical is based on the Oscar-nominated classic film. Jorah Kwamé is composing with lyrics by Siedah Garrett. Kamilah Forbes is attached to direct. The work is being produced by Will Smith, Todd Black, James Lassiter, Steve Tisch, Jason Blumenthal, and Mark Clayman.

The production received a workshop in the winter of 2025 starring Joshua Henry, Amber Iman, and Tyrese Shawn Avery.

== Television ==
In addition to his work as a playwright, Gardley has written for numerous television series. He began his TV career writing for the Exorcist TV series for Fox. He served as a staff writer on the Amazon Prime series Z: The Beginning of Everything, and later as an executive story editor and co-executive producer for The Chi on Showtime. In 2021, he served as a co-executive producer for the hit Netflix show Maid, which won the Writers Guild of America Award for Outstanding Longform Series - Adapted. He also wrote for the Apple TV+ show Foundation. In 2023, he was a co-executive producer for Boots Riley's groundbreaking Amazon Prime series I’m a Virgo, which was nominated for the 2024 Independent Spirit Award for Best New Scripted Series.

He inked an overall deal with Amazon Studios in 2021.

=== Credits ===
2023 - I'm a Virgo (Amazon Prime) - Season 1 - Co-Executive Producer

2021 - Foundation (Apple TV+) - Season 1

2021 - Maid (Netflix) - Limited Series - Co-Executive Producer

2019 - NOS4A2 - (AMC) - Season 1 - Co-Producer

2019 - Tales of the City (Netflix) - Season 1

2018-2020 - The Chi (Showtime) - Season 1 & 3, Co-Executive Producer

2017 - Mindhunter (Netflix) - Season 2

2017 - Z: The Beginning of Everything (Amazon Prime) - Limited Series

2016 - The Exorcist (Fox) - Season 1

=== In development ===
==== The Trees ====
Gardley is developing THE TREES, based on Percival Everett's novel of the same name, starring Sterling K. Brown, Da'Vine Joy Randolph, and Winston Duke. The project is currently in a historic seven-studio bidding war. The series follows three detectives as they probe murders in Money, MS, where victims are found alongside bodies resembling Emmett Till. As similar killings are found, they are tasked with solving the supernatural mystery.

== Film ==
Gardley wrote the screenplay for the 2023 film The Color Purple, a reimagining of the Spielberg classic, starring Fantasia Barrino, Colman Domingo, and Danielle Brooks. He also sold a Marvin Gaye biopic entitled, What's Going On?, with Allen Hughes to direct and Warner Bros to produce. The studio will put up the biggest budget ever for an African American music biopic, north of $80 million.

=== The Color Purple ===
The Color Purple is a 2023 American musical period drama film based on the stage musical of the same name, which, in turn, is based on the 1982 novel by Alice Walker. Spielberg and Quincy Jones returned as producers for the 2023 film, along with its Broadway producers Scott Sanders and Oprah Winfrey, the latter of whom also starred in the 1985 film.

The film scored 13 nominations at the 55th NAACP Image Awards, winning 11, including Outstanding Motion Picture, Outstanding Ensemble Cast in a Motion Picture, Outstanding Actress in a Motion Picture (Fantasia Barrino), Outstanding Supporting Actress (Taraji P. Henson), and Outstanding Supporting Actor (Colman Domingo). The film set the record as the motion picture with the most nominations and wins, since the ceremony's inception in the 1960s, surpassing Black Panther, The Best Man, and Jingle Jangle: A Christmas Journey, which all tied for 10 nominations.

It exceeded expectations and grossed $18.2 million, finishing first at the box office for the day. Its opening day was the second-highest domestic opening for a film on Christmas Day of all time (behind Sherlock Holmes' $24.6 million in 2009), and the highest-grossing domestic opening day for a musical since the COVID-19 pandemic.

=== What's Going On? ===
The Marvin Gaye estate and Motown are involved in the project, with Gaye's widow, Jan Gaye, serving as an executive producer alongside Suzanne de Passe. Dr. Dre, Jimmy Iovine, and Andrew Lazar are also attached as producers. Hughes and the producers will begin searching for an actor to portray Gaye, with production expected to begin next year. The film is panned for a theatrical release through Warner Bros. and a subsequent release on HBO Max. It will explore Gaye's life and personal struggles that shaped his career and music.

=== In development ===
==== The Fire is Upon Us ====
This film is based on the book, The Fire Is Upon Us: James Baldwin, William F. Buckley Jr., and the Debate over Race in America, by Nicholas Buccola. Universal Pictures and Janelle Monáe are attached to produce. The film follows the parallel rises of James Baldwin and William F. Buckley that comes to a head at their famous debate in Cambridge Union in 1965.

==== Queen Creole ====
The film is based on Gardley's hit play, The House that will not Stand. The film follows the lives of free Creole women in 1813 New Orleans, who became wealthy through plaçage, or the practice of common-law marriages between white men and women of color in what was then a French colony. However, after Louisiana was sold to the U.S. in 1803, Black women found themselves increasingly marginalized as their legal rights were diminished.

==== Brotherly ====
This film is centered around the music of the internationally known group, Boyz II Men. While it is not a biopic, it is a film based on their music. Amazon Studios, Davis Entertainment, and Malcolm D. Lee's Blackmaled Productions are attached to produce. The film will follow four men as they return to West Philadelphia for a high school reunion 20 years after having gone their separate ways — eventually finding hope, redemption and a new understanding of the enduring power of friendship.

== Teaching ==
=== Yale School of Drama ===
Gardley currently serves as the co-chair of the playwriting program at the David Geffen School of Drama at Yale University alongside Anne Erbe.

=== Additional teaching ===
Before he took the position at Yale, he was a professor of creative writing at Columbia University. He then went on to be a professor at the University of San Francisco, a professor of playwriting and African-American studies at the University of Massachusetts Amherst, and was an assistant professor of theatre arts and performance studies at Brown University.

During the pandemic, in 2020, he produced three writers workshops in Los Angeles, teaching the principles of TV writing and screenwriting. He also advises several workshops for the Frank Silvera Writers' Workshop Online, and teaches an annual screenwriting course as a part of the Antigravity Academy.

== Other theater credits (not listed above) ==
- The Box (The Foundry Theatre)
- Dance of the Holy Ghost (Yale Repertory Theater)
- Desire (Part of an Anthology) (New York Stage and Film, 59E59)
- Lear (California Shakespeare Theater)
- like sun fallin' in the mouth (National Black Theatre Festival)
- (L)imitations of Life (Empty Space Theater)
- Love is a Dream House in Lorin (Shotgun Players)
- The Victorian

== Awards and honors ==
- 2025 - [https://orchardproject.com/taste-of-something-new-2025/ Orchard Project 2026 Inspiration Award Winner
- 2024 - International Black Theatre Festival - August Wilson Award
- 2024 - Black Reel Award - Outstanding First Screenplay - Nominee (The Color Purple)
- 2024 - NAACP Image Award - Outstanding Writing in a Motion Picture - Nominee (The Color Purple)
- 2024 - Georgia Film Critics Association - Oglethorpe Award for Excellence in Georgia Cinema - Nominee (The Color Purple)
- 2024 - Independent Spirit Award - Best New Scripted Series - Nominee (I’m a Virgo)
- 2023 - Variety’s 10 Screenwriters to Watch
- 2023 - AUDELCO Award - Best Play - Winner (black odyssey)
- 2023 - AUDELCO Award - Best Playwright - Winner (black odyssey)
- 2023 - Drama Desk Award - Outstanding Adaptation - Nominee (black odyssey)
- 2023 - Gotham Independent Film Award - Breakthrough Series, Under 40 minutes - Nominee (I’m a Virgo)
- 2022 - Black Reel Awards for Television - Outstanding Writing, TV Movie/Limited Series - Nominee (Maid)
- 2022 - Writers Guild Award - Adapted Long Form - Winner (Maid)
- 2020 - Writers Guild Award - Best Drama Series - Nominee (Mindhunter)
- 2019 - Library Laureate of San Francisco
- 2019 - Obie Award for Playwriting (The House that will not Stand)
- 2019 - Doris Duke Artist Award Recipient
- 2018 - AUDELCO Award - Best Play - Winner (The House that will not Stand)
- 2018 - California Shakespeare Guiding Light Award Recipient
- 2017 - NYTimes Critics Pick (X: Or, Betty Shabazz v. The Nation)
- 2017 - Special Citation Theater Award (black odyssey)
- 2015 - Kennedy Prize Finalist (The House that will not Stand)
- 2015 - Glickman Award (The House that will not Stand)
- 2014 - Kennedy Prize Finalist (the road weeps, the well runs dry)
- 2013 - USA James Baldwin Fellow
- 2011 - Helen Hayes Awards - The Charles MacArthur Award for Outstanding New Play - Nominee (every tongue confess)
- 2011 - PEN Laura Pels Winner - American Playwright in Mid-Career
- 2011 - Aetna New Voices Fellowship at Hartford Stage
- 2010 - National Critics Steinberg New Play Award - Nominee (every tongue confess)
- 2009 - Best Play in Bay Area Theater (This World in a Woman’s Hands)
- 2008 - Helen Merrill Award
- 2007 - National Critics Steinberg New Play Award (Love is a Dream House in Lorin)
- 2007 - Best Play in Bay Area Theater (Love is a Dream House in Lorin)
- 2007 - Kesslering Honor Award
- 2005 - Dramatists Magazine Playwright to Follow
- 2004 - ASCAP Cole Porter Prize
- 2003 - San Francisco Bay Area's Gerbode Emerging Playwright Award
- 2001 - Eugene O'Neill Memorial Scholarship
- Marcus Gardley Day - Oakland, California, September 26th
