= Kevin Slattery =

Australian rules footballer (1926–2004)

Personal information
- Full name: Kevin James Slattery
- Born: 18 September 1926
- Died: 4 September 2004 (aged 77)
- Height: 187 cm (6 ft 2 in)
- Weight: 83 kg (183 lb)

Playing career^{1}
Years	Club	Games (Goals)
1947	North Melbourne	8 (2)
- ^{1} Playing statistics correct to the end of 1947.

Kevin James Slattery (18 September 1926 – 4 September 2004) was an Australian rules footballer who played with North Melbourne in the Victorian Football League (VFL).
