= Matlock (1986 TV series) season 3 =

Matlock
- Season 3
- No. of episodes: 20

Release
- Original network: NBC
- Original release: November 29, 1988 – May 16, 1989

Season chronology
- ← Previous; Season 2 Next → Season 4

The third season of Matlock originally aired in the United States on NBC from November 29, 1988, through May 16, 1989.

== Cast ==
- Andy Griffith as Ben Matlock
- Nancy Stafford as Michelle Thomas
- Julie Sommars as ADA Julie March
- Kene Holliday as Tyler Hudson

Cast notes

- Julie Sommars joined the cast this season
- Don Knotts begins making recurring appearances as Matlock's neighbor Les Calhoun.
- Kene Holliday departed at the end of the season, but appeared twice more early in Season 4. He missed 7 episodes, because he was sent to a rehabilitation clinic, for his drug and alcohol abuse.
- Kene Holliday was absent for eight episodes
- Julie Sommars was absent for fifteen episodes
- Nancy Stafford was absent for six episodes

== Episodes ==
No. overall	No. in season	Title	Directed by	Written by	Original release date	Viewers (millions)
48	1	"The Lemon"	Leo Penn	Diana Kopald Marcus	November 29, 1988	28.0
49	2	"The Ambassador: Part 1"	Christopher Hibler	Story by : Dean Hargrove & Joel Steiger; Teleplay by : Anne Collins	December 6, 1988	23.7
50	3	"The Ambassador: Part 2"	Christopher Hibler	Story by : Dean Hargrove & Joel Steiger; Teleplay by : Anne Collins	December 13, 1988	26.0
51	4	"The Mistress"	Harvey S. Laidman	Robert Hamilton	December 20, 1988	24.6
52	5	"The D.J."	Tony Mordente	Bill Dana	January 3, 1989	25.6
53	6	"The Captain"	Frank Thackery	Lincoln Kibbee	January 10, 1989	25.9
54	7	"The Vendetta"	David Solomon	Robert Schlitt	January 17, 1989	27.6
55	8	"The Mayor: Part 1"	Harvey S. Laidman	Story by : Dean Hargrove & Joel Steiger; Teleplay by : Robert Schlitt	January 31, 1989	26.4
56	9	"The Mayor: Part 2"	Harvey S. Laidman	Story by : Dean Hargrove & Joel Steiger; Teleplay by : Robert Schlitt	February 7, 1989	26.5
57	10	"The Black Widow"	Christopher Hibler	Gerald Sanoff	February 14, 1989	26.8
58	11	"The Other Woman"	Robert Scheerer	Phil Mishkin	February 21, 1989	27.3
59	12	"The Starlet"	Harvey S. Laidman	Marvin Kupfer	February 28, 1989	28.3
60	13	"The Psychic"	Frank Thackery	Beth Austin & Ron Austin (television story and teleplay by); From a story by: Sue Downey	March 7, 1989	27.1
61	14	"The Thief: Part 1"	Harvey S. Laidman	Gerald Sanoff	March 28, 1989	26.5
62	15	"The Thief: Part 2"	Harvey S. Laidman	Gerald Sanoff	April 4, 1989	23.7
63	16	"The Thoroughbred"	Leo Penn	Mary Ann Kasica & Michael Scheff	April 18, 1989	22.0
64	17	"The Model"	Tony Mordente	Robert Schlitt	April 25, 1989	22.4
65	18	"The Cult"	Harvey S. Laidman	Marvin Kupfer	May 2, 1989	23.5
66	19	"The Blues Singer"	Leo Penn	Joel Steiger	May 9, 1989	23.6
67	20	"The Priest"	Harvey S. Laidman	Max Eisenberg	May 16, 1989	22.7
