= Matlock (1986 TV series) season 4 =

Matlock
- Season 4
- No. of episodes: 24

Release
- Original network: NBC
- Original release: September 19, 1989 – May 8, 1990

Season chronology
- ← Previous; Season 3 Next → Season 5

The fourth season of Matlock originally aired in the United States on NBC with a two-hour season premiere from September 19, 1989, through May 8, 1990.

== Cast ==
=== Main ===
- Andy Griffith as Ben Matlock
- Nancy Stafford as Michelle Thomas
- Julie Sommars as ADA Julie March
- Clarence Gilyard as Conrad McMasters

=== Recurring ===
- Kene Holliday as Tyler Hudson

Cast notes

- Clarence Gilyard Jr. joined the cast this season
- Kene Holliday was credited in "The Best Seller" and "The Witness" instead of Gilyard who didn't appear in those episodes.
- Julie Sommars was absent for seventeen episodes
- Nancy Stafford was absent for eleven episodes
- Clarence Gilyard Jr. was absent for seven episodes

== Episodes ==
No. overall	No. in season	Title	Directed by	Written by	Original release date	Viewers (millions)
68	1	"The Hunting Party"	Robert Scheerer	Story by : Dean Hargrove & Joel Steiger; Teleplay by : Anne Collins	September 19, 1989	28.4
69	2	"The Hunting Party"	Robert Scheerer	Story by : Dean Hargrove & Joel Steiger; Teleplay by : Anne Collins	September 19, 1989	28.4
70	3	"The Good Boy"	Christopher Hibler	David Hoffman & Leslie Daryl Zerg	September 26, 1989	23.9
71	4	"The Best Seller"	Christopher Hibler	Robert Schlitt	October 10, 1989	20.5
72	5	"The Ex"	Harvey S. Laidman	Diana Kopald Marcus	October 17, 1989	19.0
73	6	"The Clown"	Leo Penn	Lincoln Kibbee	October 24, 1989	23.7
74	7	"The Star"	Seymour Robbie	Story by : Joyce Burditt, Dean Hargrove & Joel Steiger; Teleplay by : Anne Collins	October 31, 1989	25.1
75	8	"The Con Man"	Leo Penn	Gerald Sanoff	November 7, 1989	24.1
76	9	"The Prisoner: Part 1"	Harvey S. Laidman	Story by : Marvin Kupfer & Gerald Sanoff; Teleplay by : Gerald Sanoff	November 14, 1989	22.3
77	10	"The Prisoner: Part 2"	Harvey S. Laidman	Story by : Marvin Kupfer & Gerald Sanoff; Teleplay by : Gerald Sanoff	November 21, 1989	23.7
78	11	"The Fugitive"	Tony Mordente	Bruce Shelly & Reed Shelly	November 28, 1989	24.4
79	12	"The Buddies"	Frank Thackery	Phil Mishkin	December 12, 1989	24.7
80	13	"The Scrooge"	Harvey S. Laidman	Story by : Joel Steiger; Teleplay by : Anne Collins	December 19, 1989	25.6
81	14	"The Witness"	Tony Mordente	Susan Woollen	January 2, 1990	27.8
82	15	"The Student"	Burt Brinckerhoff	Story by : Marvin Kupfer; Teleplay by : Gerald Sanoff	January 9, 1990	25.4
83	16	"The Talk Show"	Robert Scheerer	David Hoffman & Leslie Daryl Zerg	January 16, 1990	25.5
84	17	"The Victim"	Robert Scheerer	Michael Marks	January 23, 1990	27.0
85	18	"The Kidnapper"	Frank Thackery	Joyce Burditt	February 6, 1990	24.1
86	19	"The Pro"	Burt Brinckerhoff	Max Eisenberg	February 13, 1990	25.4
87	20	"The Informer: Part 1"	Harvey S. Laidman	Story by : Sam Rolfe & Gerald Sanoff; Teleplay by : Gerald Sanoff	February 20, 1990	25.2
88	21	"The Informer: Part 2"	Harvey S. Laidman	Story by : Sam Rolfe & Gerald Sanoff; Teleplay by : Gerald Sanoff	February 27, 1990	25.7
89	22	"The D.A."	Russ Mayberry	Diana Kopald Marcus	March 20, 1990	23.4
90	23	"The Blackmailer"	Christopher Hibler	Gerald Sanoff	May 1, 1990	19.9
91	24	"The Cookie Monster"	Harvey S. Laidman	Michele S. Chodos & Bonnie L. DeSouza	May 8, 1990	19.0
