= Matlock (1986 TV series) season 1 =

Matlock
- Season 1
- No. of episodes: 23

Release
- Original network: NBC
- Original release: September 20, 1986 – May 12, 1987

Season chronology
- Next → Season 2

The first season of Matlock originally aired in the United States on NBC from September 20, 1986 – May 12, 1987. The two-part episode "The Don" served as a backdoor pilot for Jake and the Fatman.

== Cast ==
=== Main ===
- Andy Griffith as Ben Matlock
- Linda Purl as Charlene Matlock
- Kene Holliday as Tyler Hudson

=== Recurring ===
- Kari Lizer as Cassie Phillips
- Julie Sommars as ADA Julie March

Cast notes

- Lori Lethin was replaced by Linda Purl
- Linda Purl departed at the end of the season
- Linda Purl was absent for six episodes
- Kene Holiday was absent for one episode

== Episodes ==
No. overall	No. in season	Title	Directed by	Written by	Original release date	Rating/share (households)
1	1	"The Judge"	Christopher Hibler	Robert Hamilton	September 20, 1986	N/A
2	2	"The Stripper"	Daniel Haller	Story by : Rick Mittleman; Teleplay by : Michael Petryni	September 30, 1986	16.4/25
3	3	"The Affair"	John Llewellyn Moxey	Paul Savage	October 7, 1986	19.6/30
4	4	"The Seduction"	Nicholas Sgarro	Anne Collins	October 14, 1986	18.1/27
5	5	"The Don: Part 1"	Nicholas Sgarro	Anne Collins	October 28, 1986	17.6/27
6	6	"The Don: Part 2"	Leo Penn	Story by : Dean Hargrove & Joel Steiger; Teleplay by : Anne Collins	November 4, 1986	17.3/25
7	7	"The Sisters"	Alan Cooke	Doc Barnett	November 11, 1986	16.6/24
8	8	"The Cop"	Daniel Haller	Story by : Joel Steiger, Robert Schlitt & Dean Hargrove; Teleplay by : Robert Schlitt	November 18, 1986	17.0/25
9	9	"The Angel"	Larry Elikann	Robin Bernheim	November 25, 1986	17.1/26
10	10	"The Professor"	Bill Duke	Donald Ross	December 2, 1986	17.0/24
11	11	"Santa Claus"	Daniel Haller	Story by : Joel Steiger & Dean Hargrove; Teleplay by : Robert Schlitt	December 9, 1986	17.9/27
12	12	"The Chef"	Bob Sweeney	Story by : David R. Toddman, Joel Steiger & Dean Hargrove; Teleplay by : Anne Collins	January 6, 1987	19.6/28
13	13	"The Author"	Michael O'Herlihy	Gerald Sanoff	January 13, 1987	19.8/28
14	14	"The Rat Pack"	Nicholas Sgarro	Anne Collins	January 20, 1987	20.2/29
15	15	"The Nurse"	Charles S. Dubin	Robert Hamilton	February 3, 1987	19.7/29
16	16	"The Convict"	Daniel Haller	Marvin Kupfer	February 10, 1987	19.3/29
17	17	"The Court-Martial: Part 1"	Charles S. Dubin	Story by : Joel Steiger & Dean Hargrove; Teleplay by : Anne Collins	February 17, 1987	20.6/30
18	18	"The Court-Martial: Part 2"	Charles S. Dubin	Story by : Joel Steiger & Dean Hargrove; Teleplay by : Anne Collins	February 24, 1987	22.0/31
19	19	"The Therapist"	Christopher Hibler	Robert Hamilton	March 3, 1987	20.3/30
20	20	"The People vs. Matlock"	Charles S. Dubin	Robert Hamilton	March 24, 1987	20.3/31
21	21	"The Photographer"	Bob Sweeney	Robin Bernheim	March 31, 1987	21.2/32
22	22	"The Widow" "The Reporter"	Charles S. Dubin	Robert Hamilton	May 5, 1987	18.1/31
23	23	"The Doctors"	Tony Mordente	Dean Hargrove, Robin Bernheim & Joel Steiger	May 12, 1987	18.3/30
