= Matlock (1986 TV series) season 2 =

Matlock
- Season 2
- No. of episodes: 24

Release
- Original network: NBC
- Original release: September 22, 1987 – May 3, 1988

Season chronology
- ← Previous; Season 1 Next → Season 3

The second season of Matlock originally aired in the United States on NBC from September 22, 1987 – May 3, 1988 with a two hour season premiere (split into two parts when aired in syndication).

== Cast ==
=== Main ===
- Andy Griffith as Ben Matlock
- Nancy Stafford as Michelle Thomas
- Kari Lizer as Cassie Phillips
- Kene Holliday as Tyler Hudson

=== Recurring ===
- Julie Sommars as ADA Julie March

Cast notes

- Nancy Stafford and Kari Lizer joined the cast this season
- Kari Lizer departed at the end of the season
- Kari Lizer was absent for thirteen episodes
- Kene Holliday was absent for four episodes
- Nancy Stafford was absent for two episodes

== Episodes ==
No. overall	No. in season	Title	Directed by	Written by	Original release date	Rating/share (households)
24 25	1 2	"The Billionaire"	Christopher Hibler	Teleplay by : Anne Collins; Story by : Dean Hargrove & Joel Steiger	September 22, 1987	17.0/27
26	3	"Blind Justice"	Christian I. Nyby II	Sam Bernard	September 29, 1987	15.9/25
27	4	"The Husband"	Tony Mordente	Story by : Leigh Vance & Robert Schlitt; Teleplay by : Robert Schlitt	October 20, 1987	18.7/28
28	5	"The Power Brokers: Part 1"	Charles S. Dubin	Robert Hamilton	October 27, 1987	17.9/27
29	6	"The Power Brokers: Part 2"	Charles S. Dubin	Robert Hamilton	November 3, 1987	16.5/25
30	7	"The Annihilator"	Christopher Hibler	Story by : Rift Fournier; Teleplay by : Anne Collins	November 10, 1987	17.1/26
31	8	"The Network"	Christopher Hibler	Teleplay by : Phillip Mishkin; Story by : Dean Hargrove & Joel Steiger	December 1, 1987	14.3/22
32	9	"The Best Friend"	Tony Mordente	Gerald Sanoff	December 8, 1987	17.5/27
33	10	"The Country Boy"	Charles S. Dubin	Doc Barnett	December 15, 1987	17.0/25
34	11	"The Gift"	Tony Mordente	Robert Schlitt	December 22, 1987	17.1/29
35	12	"The Gambler"	Tony Mordente	Robert Hamilton	December 29, 1987	17.5/28
36	13	"The Body"	Charles S. Dubin	Gerald Sanoff	January 5, 1988	20.3/29
37	14	"The Reunion"	Charles S. Dubin	Maryanne Kasica & Michael Scheff	January 12, 1988	19.4/28
38	15	"The Gigolo"	Tony Mordente	Stephen Black & Henry Stern	January 19, 1988	18.3/26
39	16	"The Umpire"	Harvey S. Laidman	Phil Mishkin	January 26, 1988	18.5/27
40	17	"The Investigation: Part 1"	Christopher Hibler	Teleplay by : Anne Collins; Story by : Dean Hargrove & Joel Steiger	February 2, 1988	18.4/27
41	18	"The Investigation: Part 2"	Christopher Hibler	Teleplay by : Anne Collins; Story by : Dean Hargrove & Joel Steiger	February 9, 1988	19.2/28
42	19	"The Hucksters"	Charles S. Dubin	Teleplay by : Phil Mishkin; Story by : Dean Hargrove & Joel Steiger	February 16, 1988	18.3/27
43	20	"The Lovelorn"	Christopher Hibler	Max Eisenberg	February 23, 1988	19.0/28
44	21	"The Genius"	Frank Thackery	Lincoln Kibbee	March 15, 1988	18.5/28
45	22	"The Magician"	Christopher Hibler	Gerald Sanoff	March 22, 1988	19.2/30
46	23	"The Fisherman"	Harvey S. Laidman	Marvin Kupfer	March 29, 1988	19.0/30
47	24	"The Heiress"	Leo Penn	Diana Kopald Marcus	May 3, 1988	16.1/27
