= Matlock (1986 TV series) season 5 =

Matlock
- Season 5
- No. of episodes: 22

Release
- Original network: NBC
- Original release: September 18, 1990 – April 30, 1991

Season chronology
- ← Previous; Season 4 Next → Season 6

The fifth season of Matlock originally aired in the United States on NBC from September 18, 1990 through April 30, 1991.

== Cast ==
- Andy Griffith as Ben Matlock
- Nancy Stafford as Michelle Thomas
- Julie Sommars as ADA Julie March
- Clarence Gilyard Jr. as Conrad McMasters

Cast Notes

- Julie Sommars was absent for fourteen episodes
- Nancy Stafford was absent for eight episodes
- Clarence Gilyard Jr. was absent for four episodes

== Episodes ==
No. overall	No. in season	Title	Directed by	Written by	Original release date	Viewers (millions)
92	1	"The Mother"	Robert Scheerer	Michael Marks	September 18, 1990	23.6
93	2	"Nowhere to Turn"	Harvey S. Laidman	Story by : Dean Hargrove & Joel Steiger; Teleplay by : Anne Collins	September 25, 1990	22.8
94	3	"Nowhere to Turn"	Harvey S. Laidman	Story by : Dean Hargrove & Joel Steiger; Teleplay by : Anne Collins	September 25, 1990	22.8
95	4	"The Madam"	Leo Penn	Gerald Sanoff	October 2, 1990	23.1
96	5	"The Personal Trainer"	Burt Brinckerhoff	Lincoln Kibbee	October 9, 1990	24.0
97	6	"The Narc"	Harvey S. Laidman	Phil Mishkin	October 23, 1990	24.1
98	7	"The Secret: Part 1"	Leo Penn	Gerald Sanoff	October 30, 1990	22.6
99	8	"The Secret: Part 2"	Leo Penn	Gerald Sanoff	November 6, 1990	21.9
100	9	"The Brothers"	Christopher Hibler	Anne Collins & Gerald Sanoff	November 13, 1990	23.8
101	10	"The Cover Girl"	Christopher Hibler	Max Eisenberg	November 20, 1990	23.7
102	11	"The Biker"	Harvey S. Laidman	Bruce Shelly & Reed Shelly	November 27, 1990	24.4
103	12	"The Broker"	Robert Scheerer	Diana Kopald Marcus	December 4, 1990	22.2
104	13	"The Fighter"	Christopher Hibler	Story by : Phil Combest, David Hoffman & Leslie Daryl Zerg; Teleplay by : David Hoffman & Leslie Daryl Zerg	December 11, 1990	22.2
105	14	"The Critic"	Robert Scheerer	Phil Mishkin	January 8, 1991	24.3
106	15	"The Parents"	Harvey S. Laidman	Michael Marks	January 15, 1991	25.3
107	16	"The Man of the Year"	Burt Brinckerhoff	Story by : Gerald Sanoff; Teleplay by : Anne Collins	January 29, 1991	19.9
108	17	"The Arsonist"	Robert Scheerer	Jim McGrath	February 5, 1991	22.7
109	18	"The Formula"	Christopher Hibler	Story by : Gerald Sanoff; Teleplay by : Anne Collins	February 12, 1991	22.2
110	19	"The Trial: Part 1"	Frank Thackery	Story by : Gerald Sanoff; Teleplay by : Anne Collins	February 19, 1991	23.2
111	20	"The Trial: Part 2"	Frank Thackery	Story by : Gerald Sanoff; Teleplay by : Anne Collins	February 26, 1991	23.2
112	21	"The Accident"	Christopher Hibler	Max Eisenberg & Lonon F. Smith	March 26, 1991	22.1
113	22	"The Celebrity"	Leo Penn	Gerald Sanoff	April 30, 1991	18.6
