= List of Matlock (1986 TV series) episodes =

Matlock is an American mystery legal drama television series created by Dean Hargrove and starring Andy Griffith. The series premiered on NBC on March 3, 1986, and aired there for the first six seasons until the network cancelled the series on May 8, 1992; it later moved to ABC on November 5, 1992, and ended on May 4, 1995 after nine seasons. A total of 193 episodes were produced, including a pilot movie.

== Series overview ==
Season	Episodes	Originally released			Rank	Rating
Season	Episodes	First released	Last released	Network	Rank	Rating
Pilot		March 3, 1986		NBC	—N/a	20.9
1	23	September 23, 1986	May 12, 1987	NBC	15	18.6
2	24	September 22, 1987	May 3, 1988	NBC	14	17.8
3	20	November 29, 1988	May 16, 1989	NBC	13	17.7
4	24	September 19, 1989	May 8, 1990	NBC	20	16.6
5	22	September 18, 1990	April 30, 1991	NBC	17	15.5
6	22	October 18, 1991	May 8, 1992	NBC	39	12.4
7	18	November 5, 1992	May 6, 1993	ABC	29	13.2
8	22	September 23, 1993	May 19, 1994	ABC	35	12.1
9	18	October 13, 1994	May 4, 1995	ABC	61	10.0

== Episodes ==
=== Pilot (1986) ===
Actor	Character
Andy Griffith	Ben Matlock
Lori Lethin	Charlene Matlock
Alice Hirson	Hazel
Kene Holliday	Tyler Hudson

Title	Directed by	Written by	Original release date	Rating/share (households)
"Diary of a Perfect Murder"	Robert Day	Dean Hargrove	March 3, 1986	20.9/33
Ben Matlock (Andy Griffith) and his daughter Charlene (Lori Lethin) defend TV journalist Steve Emerson (Steve Inwood) who is accused of killing Linda Coolidge (Katherine Cannon), his ex-wife. Note: It originally aired as a two-hour series premiere during the spring of the 1985–86 network TV season, with subsequent two-part airings. In this TV movie it mentions that Ben's mom is still alive, but in later episodes it says that his mom died when he was young. The courtroom used is also different and larger, and the theme song and credits are uniquely composed to this story, when the full series would use a more upbeat rendition of the theme tune and footage as opposed to still photography with filters on it. Other guest stars: Billy Green Bush as Billy Ray Webber, Lawrence Pressman as Nelson White, Dennis Lipscomb as Les McCall, Richard Newton as Judge Reynolds, Robin Thomas Grossman as Prosecutor Burton Hawkins, Darrell Zwerling as Dr. Farnsworth, Peter White I as Attorney Harvey Ravanelle, James McEachin as Lt. Frank Daniels, Al Ruscio as Ernie "The Tailor" Marzell

=== Season 1 (1986–87) ===
The character Charlene Matlock, played by Lori Lethin in the pilot, was played by Linda Purl in the first season of the series.

The two-part episode "The Don" served as a back-door pilot for Jake and the Fatman.

No. overall	No. in season	Title	Directed by	Written by	Original release date	Rating/share (households)
1	1	"The Judge"	Christopher Hibler	Robert Hamilton	September 20, 1986	N/A
2	2	"The Stripper"	Daniel Haller	Story by : Rick Mittleman; Teleplay by : Michael Petryni	September 30, 1986	16.4/25
3	3	"The Affair"	John Llewellyn Moxey	Paul Savage	October 7, 1986	19.6/30
4	4	"The Seduction"	Nicholas Sgarro	Anne Collins	October 14, 1986	18.1/27
5	5	"The Don: Part 1"	Nicholas Sgarro	Anne Collins	October 28, 1986	17.6/27
6	6	"The Don: Part 2"	Leo Penn	Story by : Dean Hargrove & Joel Steiger; Teleplay by : Anne Collins	November 4, 1986	17.3/25
7	7	"The Sisters"	Alan Cooke	Doc Barnett	November 11, 1986	16.6/24
8	8	"The Cop"	Daniel Haller	Story by : Joel Steiger, Robert Schlitt & Dean Hargrove; Teleplay by : Robert Schlitt	November 18, 1986	17.0/25
9	9	"The Angel"	Larry Elikann	Robin Bernheim	November 25, 1986	17.1/26
10	10	"The Professor"	Bill Duke	Donald Ross	December 2, 1986	17.0/24
11	11	"Santa Claus"	Daniel Haller	Story by : Joel Steiger & Dean Hargrove; Teleplay by : Robert Schlitt	December 9, 1986	17.9/27
12	12	"The Chef"	Bob Sweeney	Story by : David R. Toddman, Joel Steiger & Dean Hargrove; Teleplay by : Anne Collins	January 6, 1987	19.6/28
13	13	"The Author"	Michael O'Herlihy	Gerald Sanoff	January 13, 1987	19.8/28
14	14	"The Rat Pack"	Nicholas Sgarro	Anne Collins	January 20, 1987	20.2/29
15	15	"The Nurse"	Charles S. Dubin	Robert Hamilton	February 3, 1987	19.7/29
16	16	"The Convict"	Daniel Haller	Marvin Kupfer	February 10, 1987	19.3/29
17	17	"The Court-Martial: Part 1"	Charles S. Dubin	Story by : Joel Steiger & Dean Hargrove; Teleplay by : Anne Collins	February 17, 1987	20.6/30
18	18	"The Court-Martial: Part 2"	Charles S. Dubin	Story by : Joel Steiger & Dean Hargrove; Teleplay by : Anne Collins	February 24, 1987	22.0/31
19	19	"The Therapist"	Christopher Hibler	Robert Hamilton	March 3, 1987	20.3/30
20	20	"The People vs. Matlock"	Charles S. Dubin	Robert Hamilton	March 24, 1987	20.3/31
21	21	"The Photographer"	Bob Sweeney	Robin Bernheim	March 31, 1987	21.2/32
22	22	"The Widow" "The Reporter"	Charles S. Dubin	Robert Hamilton	May 5, 1987	18.1/31
23	23	"The Doctors"	Tony Mordente	Dean Hargrove, Robin Bernheim & Joel Steiger	May 12, 1987	18.3/30

=== Season 2 (1987–88) ===
No. overall	No. in season	Title	Directed by	Written by	Original release date	Rating/share (households)
24 25	1 2	"The Billionaire"	Christopher Hibler	Teleplay by : Anne Collins; Story by : Dean Hargrove & Joel Steiger	September 22, 1987	17.0/27
26	3	"Blind Justice"	Christian I. Nyby II	Sam Bernard	September 29, 1987	15.9/25
27	4	"The Husband"	Tony Mordente	Story by : Leigh Vance & Robert Schlitt; Teleplay by : Robert Schlitt	October 20, 1987	18.7/28
28	5	"The Power Brokers: Part 1"	Charles S. Dubin	Robert Hamilton	October 27, 1987	17.9/27
29	6	"The Power Brokers: Part 2"	Charles S. Dubin	Robert Hamilton	November 3, 1987	16.5/25
30	7	"The Annihilator"	Christopher Hibler	Story by : Rift Fournier; Teleplay by : Anne Collins	November 10, 1987	17.1/26
31	8	"The Network"	Christopher Hibler	Teleplay by : Phillip Mishkin; Story by : Dean Hargrove & Joel Steiger	December 1, 1987	14.3/22
32	9	"The Best Friend"	Tony Mordente	Gerald Sanoff	December 8, 1987	17.5/27
33	10	"The Country Boy"	Charles S. Dubin	Doc Barnett	December 15, 1987	17.0/25
34	11	"The Gift"	Tony Mordente	Robert Schlitt	December 22, 1987	17.1/29
35	12	"The Gambler"	Tony Mordente	Robert Hamilton	December 29, 1987	17.5/28
36	13	"The Body"	Charles S. Dubin	Gerald Sanoff	January 5, 1988	20.3/29
37	14	"The Reunion"	Charles S. Dubin	Maryanne Kasica & Michael Scheff	January 12, 1988	19.4/28
38	15	"The Gigolo"	Tony Mordente	Stephen Black & Henry Stern	January 19, 1988	18.3/26
39	16	"The Umpire"	Harvey S. Laidman	Phil Mishkin	January 26, 1988	18.5/27
40	17	"The Investigation: Part 1"	Christopher Hibler	Teleplay by : Anne Collins; Story by : Dean Hargrove & Joel Steiger	February 2, 1988	18.4/27
41	18	"The Investigation: Part 2"	Christopher Hibler	Teleplay by : Anne Collins; Story by : Dean Hargrove & Joel Steiger	February 9, 1988	19.2/28
42	19	"The Hucksters"	Charles S. Dubin	Teleplay by : Phil Mishkin; Story by : Dean Hargrove & Joel Steiger	February 16, 1988	18.3/27
43	20	"The Lovelorn"	Christopher Hibler	Max Eisenberg	February 23, 1988	19.0/28
44	21	"The Genius"	Frank Thackery	Lincoln Kibbee	March 15, 1988	18.5/28
45	22	"The Magician"	Christopher Hibler	Gerald Sanoff	March 22, 1988	19.2/30
46	23	"The Fisherman"	Harvey S. Laidman	Marvin Kupfer	March 29, 1988	19.0/30
47	24	"The Heiress"	Leo Penn	Diana Kopald Marcus	May 3, 1988	16.1/27

=== Season 3 (1988–89) ===
No. overall	No. in season	Title	Directed by	Written by	Original release date	Viewers (millions)
48	1	"The Lemon"	Leo Penn	Diana Kopald Marcus	November 29, 1988	28.0
49	2	"The Ambassador: Part 1"	Christopher Hibler	Story by : Dean Hargrove & Joel Steiger; Teleplay by : Anne Collins	December 6, 1988	23.7
50	3	"The Ambassador: Part 2"	Christopher Hibler	Story by : Dean Hargrove & Joel Steiger; Teleplay by : Anne Collins	December 13, 1988	26.0
51	4	"The Mistress"	Harvey S. Laidman	Robert Hamilton	December 20, 1988	24.6
52	5	"The D.J."	Tony Mordente	Bill Dana	January 3, 1989	25.6
53	6	"The Captain"	Frank Thackery	Lincoln Kibbee	January 10, 1989	25.9
54	7	"The Vendetta"	David Solomon	Robert Schlitt	January 17, 1989	27.6
55	8	"The Mayor: Part 1"	Harvey S. Laidman	Story by : Dean Hargrove & Joel Steiger; Teleplay by : Robert Schlitt	January 31, 1989	26.4
56	9	"The Mayor: Part 2"	Harvey S. Laidman	Story by : Dean Hargrove & Joel Steiger; Teleplay by : Robert Schlitt	February 7, 1989	26.5
57	10	"The Black Widow"	Christopher Hibler	Gerald Sanoff	February 14, 1989	26.8
58	11	"The Other Woman"	Robert Scheerer	Phil Mishkin	February 21, 1989	27.3
59	12	"The Starlet"	Harvey S. Laidman	Marvin Kupfer	February 28, 1989	28.3
60	13	"The Psychic"	Frank Thackery	Beth Austin & Ron Austin (television story and teleplay by); From a story by: Sue Downey	March 7, 1989	27.1
61	14	"The Thief: Part 1"	Harvey S. Laidman	Gerald Sanoff	March 28, 1989	26.5
62	15	"The Thief: Part 2"	Harvey S. Laidman	Gerald Sanoff	April 4, 1989	23.7
63	16	"The Thoroughbred"	Leo Penn	Mary Ann Kasica & Michael Scheff	April 18, 1989	22.0
64	17	"The Model"	Tony Mordente	Robert Schlitt	April 25, 1989	22.4
65	18	"The Cult"	Harvey S. Laidman	Marvin Kupfer	May 2, 1989	23.5
66	19	"The Blues Singer"	Leo Penn	Joel Steiger	May 9, 1989	23.6
67	20	"The Priest"	Harvey S. Laidman	Max Eisenberg	May 16, 1989	22.7

=== Season 4 (1989–90) ===
No. overall	No. in season	Title	Directed by	Written by	Original release date	Viewers (millions)
68	1	"The Hunting Party"	Robert Scheerer	Story by : Dean Hargrove & Joel Steiger; Teleplay by : Anne Collins	September 19, 1989	28.4
69	2	"The Hunting Party"	Robert Scheerer	Story by : Dean Hargrove & Joel Steiger; Teleplay by : Anne Collins	September 19, 1989	28.4
70	3	"The Good Boy"	Christopher Hibler	David Hoffman & Leslie Daryl Zerg	September 26, 1989	23.9
71	4	"The Best Seller"	Christopher Hibler	Robert Schlitt	October 10, 1989	20.5
72	5	"The Ex"	Harvey S. Laidman	Diana Kopald Marcus	October 17, 1989	19.0
73	6	"The Clown"	Leo Penn	Lincoln Kibbee	October 24, 1989	23.7
74	7	"The Star"	Seymour Robbie	Story by : Joyce Burditt, Dean Hargrove & Joel Steiger; Teleplay by : Anne Collins	October 31, 1989	25.1
75	8	"The Con Man"	Leo Penn	Gerald Sanoff	November 7, 1989	24.1
76	9	"The Prisoner: Part 1"	Harvey S. Laidman	Story by : Marvin Kupfer & Gerald Sanoff; Teleplay by : Gerald Sanoff	November 14, 1989	22.3
77	10	"The Prisoner: Part 2"	Harvey S. Laidman	Story by : Marvin Kupfer & Gerald Sanoff; Teleplay by : Gerald Sanoff	November 21, 1989	23.7
78	11	"The Fugitive"	Tony Mordente	Bruce Shelly & Reed Shelly	November 28, 1989	24.4
79	12	"The Buddies"	Frank Thackery	Phil Mishkin	December 12, 1989	24.7
80	13	"The Scrooge"	Harvey S. Laidman	Story by : Joel Steiger; Teleplay by : Anne Collins	December 19, 1989	25.6
81	14	"The Witness"	Tony Mordente	Susan Woollen	January 2, 1990	27.8
82	15	"The Student"	Burt Brinckerhoff	Story by : Marvin Kupfer; Teleplay by : Gerald Sanoff	January 9, 1990	25.4
83	16	"The Talk Show"	Robert Scheerer	David Hoffman & Leslie Daryl Zerg	January 16, 1990	25.5
84	17	"The Victim"	Robert Scheerer	Michael Marks	January 23, 1990	27.0
85	18	"The Kidnapper"	Frank Thackery	Joyce Burditt	February 6, 1990	24.1
86	19	"The Pro"	Burt Brinckerhoff	Max Eisenberg	February 13, 1990	25.4
87	20	"The Informer: Part 1"	Harvey S. Laidman	Story by : Sam Rolfe & Gerald Sanoff; Teleplay by : Gerald Sanoff	February 20, 1990	25.2
88	21	"The Informer: Part 2"	Harvey S. Laidman	Story by : Sam Rolfe & Gerald Sanoff; Teleplay by : Gerald Sanoff	February 27, 1990	25.7
89	22	"The D.A."	Russ Mayberry	Diana Kopald Marcus	March 20, 1990	23.4
90	23	"The Blackmailer"	Christopher Hibler	Gerald Sanoff	May 1, 1990	19.9
91	24	"The Cookie Monster"	Harvey S. Laidman	Michele S. Chodos & Bonnie L. DeSouza	May 8, 1990	19.0

=== Season 5 (1990–91) ===
No. overall	No. in season	Title	Directed by	Written by	Original release date	Viewers (millions)
92	1	"The Mother"	Robert Scheerer	Michael Marks	September 18, 1990	23.6
93	2	"Nowhere to Turn"	Harvey S. Laidman	Story by : Dean Hargrove & Joel Steiger; Teleplay by : Anne Collins	September 25, 1990	22.8
94	3	"Nowhere to Turn"	Harvey S. Laidman	Story by : Dean Hargrove & Joel Steiger; Teleplay by : Anne Collins	September 25, 1990	22.8
95	4	"The Madam"	Leo Penn	Gerald Sanoff	October 2, 1990	23.1
96	5	"The Personal Trainer"	Burt Brinckerhoff	Lincoln Kibbee	October 9, 1990	24.0
97	6	"The Narc"	Harvey S. Laidman	Phil Mishkin	October 23, 1990	24.1
98	7	"The Secret: Part 1"	Leo Penn	Gerald Sanoff	October 30, 1990	22.6
99	8	"The Secret: Part 2"	Leo Penn	Gerald Sanoff	November 6, 1990	21.9
100	9	"The Brothers"	Christopher Hibler	Anne Collins & Gerald Sanoff	November 13, 1990	23.8
101	10	"The Cover Girl"	Christopher Hibler	Max Eisenberg	November 20, 1990	23.7
102	11	"The Biker"	Harvey S. Laidman	Bruce Shelly & Reed Shelly	November 27, 1990	24.4
103	12	"The Broker"	Robert Scheerer	Diana Kopald Marcus	December 4, 1990	22.2
104	13	"The Fighter"	Christopher Hibler	Story by : Phil Combest, David Hoffman & Leslie Daryl Zerg; Teleplay by : David Hoffman & Leslie Daryl Zerg	December 11, 1990	22.2
105	14	"The Critic"	Robert Scheerer	Phil Mishkin	January 8, 1991	24.3
106	15	"The Parents"	Harvey S. Laidman	Michael Marks	January 15, 1991	25.3
107	16	"The Man of the Year"	Burt Brinckerhoff	Story by : Gerald Sanoff; Teleplay by : Anne Collins	January 29, 1991	19.9
108	17	"The Arsonist"	Robert Scheerer	Jim McGrath	February 5, 1991	22.7
109	18	"The Formula"	Christopher Hibler	Story by : Gerald Sanoff; Teleplay by : Anne Collins	February 12, 1991	22.2
110	19	"The Trial: Part 1"	Frank Thackery	Story by : Gerald Sanoff; Teleplay by : Anne Collins	February 19, 1991	23.2
111	20	"The Trial: Part 2"	Frank Thackery	Story by : Gerald Sanoff; Teleplay by : Anne Collins	February 26, 1991	23.2
112	21	"The Accident"	Christopher Hibler	Max Eisenberg & Lonon F. Smith	March 26, 1991	22.1
113	22	"The Celebrity"	Leo Penn	Gerald Sanoff	April 30, 1991	18.6

=== Season 6 (1991–92) ===
No. overall	No. in season	Title	Directed by	Written by	Original release date	Viewers (millions)
114 115	1 2	"The Witness Killings"	Christopher Hibler	Story by : Gerald Sanoff; Teleplay by : Anne Collins	October 18, 1991	21.2
116	3	"The Strangler"	Leo Penn	Lincoln Kilbee	October 25, 1991	14.9
117	4	"The Nightmare"	Robert Scheerer	Anne Collins	November 1, 1991	14.0
118	5	"The Marriage Counselor"	Christopher Hibler	Phil Mishkin	November 8, 1991	19.1
119	6	"The Dame"	Leo Penn	David Hoffman	November 15, 1991	17.7
120 121	7 8	"The Suspect"	Harvey S. Laidman	Story by : Gerald Sanoff & Joel Stieger; Teleplay by : Anne Collins	November 29, 1991	19.4
122	9	"The Defense"	Peter Ellis II	Gerald Sanoff	December 6, 1991	16.2
123	10	"The Game Show"	Robert Scheerer	Max Eisenberg & Lonon F. Smith	December 13, 1991	16.5
124	11	"The Foursome"	Harvey S. Laidman	Diana Kopald Marcus	December 20, 1991	18.0
125	12	"The Picture: Part 1"	Leo Penn	Story by : Gerald Sanoff & Joel Stieger; Teleplay by : Anne Collins	January 17, 1992	20.6
126	13	"The Picture: Part 2"	Leo Penn	Story by : Gerald Sanoff & Joel Stieger; Teleplay by : Anne Collins	January 24, 1992	18.4
127 128	14 15	"The Outcast"	Frank Thackery	Robert Schlitt	February 7, 1992	22.1
129	16	"The Big Payoff"	Leo Penn	Story by : Joel Stieger; Teleplay by : Gerry Conway	February 28, 1992	18.7
130	17	"The Abduction"	Robert Scheerer	Lincoln Kibbee	March 6, 1992	19.2
131	18	"Mr. Awesome"	Harvey S. Laidman	William T. Conway	April 17, 1992	14.2
132	19	"The Evening News: Part 1"	Harvey S. Laidman	Story by : Gerald Sanoff; Teleplay by : Anne Collins	April 24, 1992	13.6
133	20	"The Evening News: Part 2"	Harvey S. Laidman	Story by : Gerald Sanoff; Teleplay by : Anne Collins	May 1, 1992	13.4
134 135	21 22	"The Assassination"	Christopher Hibler	Story by : Gerald Sanoff and Joel Steiger; Teleplay by : Anne Collins	May 8, 1992	24.7

=== Season 7 (1992–93) ===
No. overall	No. in season	Title	Directed by	Written by	Original release date	Viewers (millions)
136	1	"The Vacation"	Harvey Laidman	Gerry Conway	November 5, 1992	20.9
137	2	"The Vacation"	Harvey Laidman	Gerry Conway	November 5, 1992	20.9
138 139	3 4	"The Legacy"	Harvey S. Laidman	Story by : Gerald Sanoff; Teleplay by : D.O'Brien	November 19, 1992	16.6
140	5	"The Ghost"	Harvey S. Laidman	Gerry Conway	January 14, 1993	22.4
141	6	"The Class"	Harvey S. Laidman	Story by : Joel Steiger; Teleplay by : D.O'Brien	January 21, 1993	19.3
142	7	"The Singer"	Harvey S. Laidman	Robert Brennen	January 28, 1993	N/A
143	8	"The Mark"	Harvey S. Laidman	Robert Schlitt	February 4, 1993	20.9
144	9	"The Juror"	Frank Thackery	Gerald Sanoff	February 11, 1993	21.2
145 146	10 11	"The Fortune"	Leo Penn	Story by : Joel Steiger; Teleplay by : Anne Collins	February 18, 1993	19.0
147	12	"The Debt"	Christopher Hibler	Richard Collins	March 18, 1993	18.5
148	13	"The Revenge"	Frank Thackery	Story by : Gerald Sanoff; Teleplay by : Anne Collins	March 25, 1993	19.0
149	14	"The Obsession"	Christopher Hibler	Max Eisenberg and Lonon F. Smith	April 1, 1993	18.8
150	15	"The Divorce"	Leo Penn	William T. Conway	April 8, 1993	16.9
151 152	16 17	"The Final Affair"	Frank Thackery	Story by : Gerald Sanoff; Teleplay by : Anne Collins	April 29, 1993	17.9
153	18	"The Competition"	Leo Penn	Story by : Gerald Sanoff; Teleplay by : Anne Collins	May 6, 1993	15.9

=== Season 8 (1993–94) ===
No. overall	No. in season	Title	Directed by	Written by	Original release date	Viewers (millions)
154	1	"The Play"	Christoper Hibler	Phil Mishkin	September 23, 1993	14.0
155	2	"The Fatal Seduction: Part 1"	Christopher Hibler	Story by : Joel Steiger & Gerald Sanoff; Teleplay by : Anne Collins	September 30, 1993	15.8
156	3	"The Fatal Seduction: Part 2"	Christopher Hibler	Story by : Joel Steiger & Gerald Sanoff; Teleplay by : Anne Collins	October 7, 1993	18.5
157	4	"The Diner"	Frank Thackery	Max Eisenberg & Lonon F. Smith	October 14, 1993	17.6
158	5	"The View"	Christopher Hibler	Story by : Gerald Sanoff; Teleplay by : Joel Steiger & Gerald Sanoff	October 28, 1993	18.2
159	6	"The Last Laugh"	Russ Mayberry	Milton Berle & Stephen Lord	November 4, 1993	16.9
160	7	"The Capital Offense"	Robert Scheerer	Brian Alan Lane	November 11, 1993	20.5
161	8	"The Haunted"	Harvey S. Laidman	Story by : Gerald Sanoff and Joel Steiger; Teleplay by : Gerry Conway	November 18, 1993	18.5
162	9	"The Haunted"	Harvey S. Laidman	Story by : Gerald Sanoff and Joel Steiger; Teleplay by : Gerry Conway	November 18, 1993	18.5
163	10	"The Conspiracy"	Leo Penn	Joel Steiger & Gerald Sanoff	November 25, 1993	11.1
164	11	"Matlock's Bad, Bad, Bad, Dream"	Russ Mayberry	Robin Madden	December 2, 1993	14.0
165	12	"The Defendant"	Leo Penn	David Hoffman	December 16, 1993	14.4
166	13	"The Kidnapping: Part 1"	Christopher Hibler	Story by : Joel Steiger & Gerald Sanoff; Teleplay by : Anne Collins	January 13, 1994	17.8
167	14	"The Kidnapping: Part 2"	Christopher Hibler	Story by : Joel Steiger & Gerald Sanoff; Teleplay by : Anne Collins	January 20, 1994	18.6
168	15	"The Temptation"	Harvey S. Laidman	Gerald Sanoff	January 27, 1994	19.2
169	16	"The Crook"	Leo Penn	Joel Steiger & Gerald Sanoff	February 3, 1994	15.3
170	17	"The Murder Game"	Frank Thackery	Teleplay by : Robert Schlitt; Story by : Donald Paul Ross and Joel Steiger & Gerald Sanoff	February 10, 1994	15.4
171	18	"Brennen"	Robert Scheerer	Teleplay by : Michael McGuire; Story by : Michael McGuire and Joel Steiger & Gerald Sanoff	February 17, 1994	15.2
172	19	"The P.I."	Christopher Hibler	J.I. Henderson & Michael Moore	March 3, 1994	16.9
173	20	"The Godfather"	Christopher Hibler	Richard Collins	April 28, 1994	15.8
174	21	"The Idol"	Frank Thackery	Story by : Joel Steiger & Gerald Sanoff; Teleplay by : Anne Collins	May 19, 1994	16.1
175	22	"The Idol"	Frank Thackery	Story by : Joel Steiger & Gerald Sanoff; Teleplay by : Anne Collins	May 19, 1994	16.1

=== Season 9 (1994–95) ===
No. overall	No. in season	Title	Directed by	Written by	Original release date	Viewers (millions)
176 177	1 2	"The Accused"	Christopher Hibler	Story by : Gerald Sanoff and Joel Steiger; Teleplay by : Anne Collins	October 13, 1994	14.2
178	3	"The Scandal"	Frank Thackery	Brian Alan Lee	October 20, 1994	14.1
179	4	"The Dare"	Leo Penn	Gerald Sanoff and Joel Steiger	October 27, 1994	14.8
180	5	"The Tabloid"	Christopher Hibler	Story by : Gerald Sanoff and Joel Steiger; Teleplay by : Anne Collins	November 3, 1994	13.2
181	6	"The Coach"	Russ Mayberry	William T. Conway	November 10, 1994	13.3
182	7	"The Dating Game"	Robert Scheerer	Barry M. Scholnick	November 17, 1994	13.1
183	8	"The Confession"	Robert Scheerer	Story by : Gerald Sanoff and Joel Steiger; Teleplay by : Robert Schlitt	December 1, 1994	14.6
184	9	"Dead Air"	Christopher Hibler	Story by : Gerald Sanoff and Joel Steiger; Teleplay by : Anne Collins	December 8, 1994	12.4
185	10	"The Getaway"	Leo Penn	Gerald Sanoff and Joel Steiger	January 5, 1995	15.8
186	11	"The Verdict"	Leo Penn	Story by : Gerald Sanoff and Joel Steiger; Teleplay by : Anne Collins	January 12, 1995	16.2
187	12	"The Deadly Dose"	Robert Scheerer	Story by : Gerald Sanoff and Joel Steiger; Teleplay by : Anne Collins	February 2, 1995	15.7
188	13	"The Target"	Frank Thackery	Gerald Sanoff and Joel Steiger	February 9, 1995	16.0
189	14	"The Assault"	Christopher Hibler	Story by : Gerald Sanoff and Joel Steiger; Teleplay by : Anne Collins	February 16, 1995	16.2
190 191	15 16	"The Heist"	Leo Penn	Story by : Gerald Sanoff and Joel Steiger; Teleplay by : Anne Collins	April 27, 1995	16.8
192 193	17 18	"The Scam"	Frank Thackery	Story by : Gerald Sanoff and Joel Steiger; Teleplay by : Anne Collins	May 4, 1995	18.8

==== Home media ====
- DVD – September 20, 2005 (Paramount Pictures)
- DVD and Blu-ray – September 17, 2013 (Paramount Pictures/Warner Bros.)
- DVD – 2019 (Paramount Pictures)
- Blu-ray – TBA (Paramount Pictures)

== See also ==
- List of Matlock characters
