= Matlock (1986 TV series) season 8 =

Matlock
- Season 8
- No. of episodes: 22

Release
- Original network: ABC
- Original release: September 23, 1993 – May 19, 1994

Season chronology
- ← Previous; Season 7 Next → Season 9

The eighth season of Matlock originally aired in the United States on ABC from September 23, 1993, and concluded with a two-hour season finale on May 19, 1994.

== Cast ==
=== Main ===
- Andy Griffith as Ben Matlock
- Brynn Thayer as Leanne McIntyre
- Daniel Roebuck as Cliff Lewis

=== Recurring ===
- Clarence Gilyard Jr. as Conrad McMasters

Cast notes

- Brynn Thayer departed at the end of the season
- Brynn Thayer was absent for one episode
- Daniel Roebuck was absent for six episodes

== Episodes ==
No. overall	No. in season	Title	Directed by	Written by	Original release date	Viewers (millions)
154	1	"The Play"	Christoper Hibler	Phil Mishkin	September 23, 1993	14.0
155	2	"The Fatal Seduction: Part 1"	Christopher Hibler	Story by : Joel Steiger & Gerald Sanoff; Teleplay by : Anne Collins	September 30, 1993	15.8
156	3	"The Fatal Seduction: Part 2"	Christopher Hibler	Story by : Joel Steiger & Gerald Sanoff; Teleplay by : Anne Collins	October 7, 1993	18.5
157	4	"The Diner"	Frank Thackery	Max Eisenberg & Lonon F. Smith	October 14, 1993	17.6
158	5	"The View"	Christopher Hibler	Story by : Gerald Sanoff; Teleplay by : Joel Steiger & Gerald Sanoff	October 28, 1993	18.2
159	6	"The Last Laugh"	Russ Mayberry	Milton Berle & Stephen Lord	November 4, 1993	16.9
160	7	"The Capital Offense"	Robert Scheerer	Brian Alan Lane	November 11, 1993	20.5
161	8	"The Haunted"	Harvey S. Laidman	Story by : Gerald Sanoff and Joel Steiger; Teleplay by : Gerry Conway	November 18, 1993	18.5
162	9	"The Haunted"	Harvey S. Laidman	Story by : Gerald Sanoff and Joel Steiger; Teleplay by : Gerry Conway	November 18, 1993	18.5
163	10	"The Conspiracy"	Leo Penn	Joel Steiger & Gerald Sanoff	November 25, 1993	11.1
164	11	"Matlock's Bad, Bad, Bad, Dream"	Russ Mayberry	Robin Madden	December 2, 1993	14.0
165	12	"The Defendant"	Leo Penn	David Hoffman	December 16, 1993	14.4
166	13	"The Kidnapping: Part 1"	Christopher Hibler	Story by : Joel Steiger & Gerald Sanoff; Teleplay by : Anne Collins	January 13, 1994	17.8
167	14	"The Kidnapping: Part 2"	Christopher Hibler	Story by : Joel Steiger & Gerald Sanoff; Teleplay by : Anne Collins	January 20, 1994	18.6
168	15	"The Temptation"	Harvey S. Laidman	Gerald Sanoff	January 27, 1994	19.2
169	16	"The Crook"	Leo Penn	Joel Steiger & Gerald Sanoff	February 3, 1994	15.3
170	17	"The Murder Game"	Frank Thackery	Teleplay by : Robert Schlitt; Story by : Donald Paul Ross and Joel Steiger & Gerald Sanoff	February 10, 1994	15.4
171	18	"Brennen"	Robert Scheerer	Teleplay by : Michael McGuire; Story by : Michael McGuire and Joel Steiger & Gerald Sanoff	February 17, 1994	15.2
172	19	"The P.I."	Christopher Hibler	J.I. Henderson & Michael Moore	March 3, 1994	16.9
173	20	"The Godfather"	Christopher Hibler	Richard Collins	April 28, 1994	15.8
174	21	"The Idol"	Frank Thackery	Story by : Joel Steiger & Gerald Sanoff; Teleplay by : Anne Collins	May 19, 1994	16.1
175	22	"The Idol"	Frank Thackery	Story by : Joel Steiger & Gerald Sanoff; Teleplay by : Anne Collins	May 19, 1994	16.1
