= Matlock (1986 TV series) season 6 =

Matlock
- Season 6
- No. of episodes: 22

Release
- Original network: NBC
- Original release: October 18, 1991 – May 8, 1992

Season chronology
- ← Previous; Season 5 Next → Season 7

The sixth season of Matlock originally aired in the United States on NBC with a two-hour season premiere from October 18, 1991 and a two-hour season finale on May 8, 1992.

== Cast ==
=== Main ===
- Andy Griffith as Ben Matlock
- Nancy Stafford as Michelle Thomas
- Julie Sommars as ADA Julie March
- Clarence Gilyard Jr. as Conrad McMasters

=== Recurring ===
- Brynn Thayer as Leanne McIntyre

Cast notes

- Nancy Stafford and Julie Sommars departed at the end of the season
- Julie Sommars was absent for thirteen episodes
- Nancy Stafford was absent for eleven episodes
- Clarence Gilyard Jr. was absent for four episodes

== Episodes ==
No. overall	No. in season	Title	Directed by	Written by	Original release date	Viewers (millions)
114 115	1 2	"The Witness Killings"	Christopher Hibler	Story by : Gerald Sanoff; Teleplay by : Anne Collins	October 18, 1991	21.2
116	3	"The Strangler"	Leo Penn	Lincoln Kilbee	October 25, 1991	14.9
117	4	"The Nightmare"	Robert Scheerer	Anne Collins	November 1, 1991	14.0
118	5	"The Marriage Counselor"	Christopher Hibler	Phil Mishkin	November 8, 1991	19.1
119	6	"The Dame"	Leo Penn	David Hoffman	November 15, 1991	17.7
120 121	7 8	"The Suspect"	Harvey S. Laidman	Story by : Gerald Sanoff & Joel Stieger; Teleplay by : Anne Collins	November 29, 1991	19.4
122	9	"The Defense"	Peter Ellis II	Gerald Sanoff	December 6, 1991	16.2
123	10	"The Game Show"	Robert Scheerer	Max Eisenberg & Lonon F. Smith	December 13, 1991	16.5
124	11	"The Foursome"	Harvey S. Laidman	Diana Kopald Marcus	December 20, 1991	18.0
125	12	"The Picture: Part 1"	Leo Penn	Story by : Gerald Sanoff & Joel Stieger; Teleplay by : Anne Collins	January 17, 1992	20.6
126	13	"The Picture: Part 2"	Leo Penn	Story by : Gerald Sanoff & Joel Stieger; Teleplay by : Anne Collins	January 24, 1992	18.4
127 128	14 15	"The Outcast"	Frank Thackery	Robert Schlitt	February 7, 1992	22.1
129	16	"The Big Payoff"	Leo Penn	Story by : Joel Stieger; Teleplay by : Gerry Conway	February 28, 1992	18.7
130	17	"The Abduction"	Robert Scheerer	Lincoln Kibbee	March 6, 1992	19.2
131	18	"Mr. Awesome"	Harvey S. Laidman	William T. Conway	April 17, 1992	14.2
132	19	"The Evening News: Part 1"	Harvey S. Laidman	Story by : Gerald Sanoff; Teleplay by : Anne Collins	April 24, 1992	13.6
133	20	"The Evening News: Part 2"	Harvey S. Laidman	Story by : Gerald Sanoff; Teleplay by : Anne Collins	May 1, 1992	13.4
134 135	21 22	"The Assassination"	Christopher Hibler	Story by : Gerald Sanoff and Joel Steiger; Teleplay by : Anne Collins	May 8, 1992	24.7
