= Matlock (1986 TV series) season 9 =

Matlock
- Season 9
- No. of episodes: 18

Release
- Original network: ABC
- Original release: October 13, 1994 – May 4, 1995

Season chronology
- ← Previous; Season 8

The ninth and final season of Matlock originally aired in the United States on ABC with a two hour season premiere from October 13, 1994 and a two hour series finale on May 4, 1995.

== Cast ==
=== Main ===
- Andy Griffith as Ben Matlock
- Daniel Roebuck as Cliff Lewis
- Carol Huston as Jerri Stone

=== Recurring ===
- David Froman as Lt. Bob Brooks
- Julie Sommars as ADA Julie March

Cast notes

- Carol Huston joined the cast this season
- Daniel Roebuck and Carol Huston both missed one episode.
- It was unclear if the show would be renewed for a tenth season, so the show-runners produced an unofficial final episode, "The Assault", and it aired slightly earlier than the remaining episodes of the season in production order. After it became certain that Season 9 would indeed be the final season of Matlock, "The Assault" would be moved to air after the last aired episode in season 9 in syndication and serve as the effective conclusion to the series.

== Episodes ==
| No. overall | No. in season | Title | Directed by | Written by | Original release date | Viewers (millions) |
|---|---|---|---|---|---|---|
| 176 177 | 1 2 | "The Accused" | Christopher Hibler | Story by : Gerald Sanoff and Joel Steiger; Teleplay by : Anne Collins | October 13, 1994 | 14.2 |
| 178 | 3 | "The Scandal" | Frank Thackery | Brian Alan Lee | October 20, 1994 | 14.1 |
| 179 | 4 | "The Dare" | Leo Penn | Gerald Sanoff and Joel Steiger | October 27, 1994 | 14.8 |
| 180 | 5 | "The Tabloid" | Christopher Hibler | Story by : Gerald Sanoff and Joel Steiger; Teleplay by : Anne Collins | November 3, 1994 | 13.2 |
| 181 | 6 | "The Coach" | Russ Mayberry | William T. Conway | November 10, 1994 | 13.3 |
| 182 | 7 | "The Dating Game" | Robert Scheerer | Barry M. Scholnick | November 17, 1994 | 13.1 |
| 183 | 8 | "The Confession" | Robert Scheerer | Story by : Gerald Sanoff and Joel Steiger; Teleplay by : Robert Schlitt | December 1, 1994 | 14.6 |
| 184 | 9 | "Dead Air" | Christopher Hibler | Story by : Gerald Sanoff and Joel Steiger; Teleplay by : Anne Collins | December 8, 1994 | 12.4 |
| 185 | 10 | "The Getaway" | Leo Penn | Gerald Sanoff and Joel Steiger | January 5, 1995 | 15.8 |
| 186 | 11 | "The Verdict" | Leo Penn | Story by : Gerald Sanoff and Joel Steiger; Teleplay by : Anne Collins | January 12, 1995 | 16.2 |
| 187 | 12 | "The Deadly Dose" | Robert Scheerer | Story by : Gerald Sanoff and Joel Steiger; Teleplay by : Anne Collins | February 2, 1995 | 15.7 |
| 188 | 13 | "The Target" | Frank Thackery | Gerald Sanoff and Joel Steiger | February 9, 1995 | 16.0 |
| 189 | 14 | "The Assault" | Christopher Hibler | Story by : Gerald Sanoff and Joel Steiger; Teleplay by : Anne Collins | February 16, 1995 | 16.2 |
| 190 191 | 15 16 | "The Heist" | Leo Penn | Story by : Gerald Sanoff and Joel Steiger; Teleplay by : Anne Collins | April 27, 1995 | 16.8 |
| 192 193 | 17 18 | "The Scam" | Frank Thackery | Story by : Gerald Sanoff and Joel Steiger; Teleplay by : Anne Collins | May 4, 1995 | 18.8 |
