= Matlock (1986 TV series) season 7 =

Matlock
- Season 7
- No. of episodes: 18

Release
- Original network: ABC
- Original release: November 5, 1992 – May 6, 1993

Season chronology
- ← Previous; Season 6 Next → Season 8

The seventh season of Matlock originally aired in the United States on ABC with a two hour season premiere from November 5, 1992 through May 6, 1993.

== Cast ==
=== Main ===
- Andy Griffith as Ben Matlock
- Brynn Thayer as Leanne McIntyre
- Daniel Roebuck as Cliff Lewis
- Clarence Gilyard as Conrad McMasters

Cast notes

- Brynn Thayer and Daniel Roebuck joined the cast this season
- Clarence Gilyard, Jr. departed as a regular at the end of the season, but appeared once more early in Season 8. For most of Gilyard's final season, he had been absent for twelve episodes
- Daniel Roebuck was absent for eleven episodes
- Brynn Thayer was absent for one episode

== Episodes ==
No. overall	No. in season	Title	Directed by	Written by	Original release date	Viewers (millions)
136	1	"The Vacation"	Harvey Laidman	Story by : Gerald Sanoff; Teleplay by : Anne Collins	November 5, 1992	20.9
137	2	"The Vacation"	Harvey Laidman	Story by : Gerald Sanoff; Teleplay by : Anne Collins	November 5, 1992	20.9
138 139	3 4	"The Legacy"	Harvey S. Laidman	Story by : Gerald Sanoff; Teleplay by : D.O'Brien	November 19, 1992	16.6
140	5	"The Ghost"	Harvey S. Laidman	Gerry Conway	January 14, 1993	22.4
141	6	"The Class"	Harvey S. Laidman	Story by : Joel Steiger; Teleplay by : D.O'Brien	January 21, 1993	19.3
142	7	"The Singer"	Harvey S. Laidman	Robert Brennen	January 28, 1993	N/A
143	8	"The Mark"	Harvey S. Laidman	Robert Schlitt	February 4, 1993	20.9
144	9	"The Juror"	Frank Thackery	Gerald Sanoff	February 11, 1993	21.2
145 146	10 11	"The Fortune"	Leo Penn	Story by : Joel Steiger; Teleplay by : Anne Collins	February 18, 1993	19.0
147	12	"The Debt"	Christopher Hibler	Richard Collins	March 18, 1993	18.5
148	13	"The Revenge"	Frank Thackery	Story by : Gerald Sanoff; Teleplay by : Anne Collins	March 25, 1993	19.0
149	14	"The Obsession"	Christopher Hibler	Max Eisenberg and Lonon F. Smith	April 1, 1993	18.8
150	15	"The Divorce"	Leo Penn	William T. Conway	April 8, 1993	16.9
151 152	16 17	"The Final Affair"	Frank Thackery	Story by : Gerald Sanoff; Teleplay by : Anne Collins	April 29, 1993	17.9
153	18	"The Competition"	Leo Penn	Story by : Gerald Sanoff; Teleplay by : Anne Collins	May 6, 1993	15.9
