= Teri Austin =

Canadian actress, animal care activist (b. 1957)

- Born: Teresa Austin; April 17, 1957 (age 69); Toronto, Ontario, Canada
- Education: North Albion Collegiate Institute; York University
- Occupations: Actress; activist
- Years active: 1983–2001 (as actress); 2001-present (as animal care activist)
- Known for: Knots Landing; Thrill of a Lifetime

Teresa "Teri" Austin (born April 17, 1957) is a Canadian animal care activist and former actress. She had her greatest acting success in the 1980s and 1990s, and is best known for her role as Jill Bennett in the CBS primetime soap opera Knots Landing, and as co-host of the Canadian reality series Thrill of a Lifetime.

== Career ==
Born and raised in Toronto, Canada, Austin began her acting career there in television, film, radio and theatre. She co-hosted the show Thrill of a Lifetime before moving to Los Angeles to pursue an acting career there.

Austin is best-known for her performance as Jill Bennett on CBS series Knots Landing. She played the role from 1985 to 1989, and in 1990 won Soap Opera Digest Award for Outstanding Villain: Prime Time. She also appeared in Quantum Leap, Seinfeld, Matlock, Murder, She Wrote, L.A. Law, and returned to soap roles in Beverly Hills, 90210 and Models Inc.. In film, she appeared in The Vindicator (1986) and Raising Cain (1992).

In 2001, Austin left acting and began working as animal care activist in Los Angeles, creating The Amanda Foundation.

== Personal ==
Austin and Knots Landing co-star Ted Shackelford were roommates at one point of time when the show was on television.

== Filmography ==
Teri Austin film and television credits
Year	Title	Role	Notes
1985–1989	Knots Landing	Jill Bennett	Recurring role, 96 episodes
1985	The Fall Guy	Annie Benton	Episode: "The King of the Stuntmen"
1985	Terminal Choice	Lylah Crane	Feature film
1986	The Vindicator	Lauren Lehman	Feature film
1988	Dangerous Love	Dominique	Feature film
1989	False Witness	Sandralee Dawson	Television film
1989	Street Legal	Alex Roper	Episode: "See No Evil"
1990	Quantum Leap	Dana Barrenger	Episode: "Her Charm"
1990	Counterstrike	The Guide	Episode: "Art for Art's Sake" (credited as Tanya Austin)
1990	Cop Rock	Trish Vaughn	Feature film
1990, 1992	Matlock	Liz Bateman (ep1); Beth (ep2)	Episodes: "The Talk Show", "The Vacation"
1991	Seinfeld	Ava	Episodes: "The Stranded", "The Revenge"
1992	Wings	Shannon Moss	Episode: "Just Say No"
1992	Raising Cain	Karen	Feature film
1993	In The Heat Of The Night	Alice	Episode: "Deadly Affection"
1993	Murder, She Wrote	Louise Walton	Episode: "A Death in Hong Kong"
1993	L.A. Law	Morgan Farrell	Episode: "Rhyme and Punishment"
1994	Beverly Hills, 90210	Ingrid	Episodes: "A Pig Is a Boy Is a Dog", "Cuffs and Links"
1994	Models Inc.	Dinah	Episodes: "Blind by Love", "Till Death Do Us Part"
1995	Baywatch Nights	Lt. Amanda Cash	Episode: "Pressure Cooker"
1995	One West Waikiki	Carrie Travis	Episode: Unhappily Ever After
1996	The Dark Mist	Diamond	Feature film
1997	Diagnosis Murder	Claire Reed	Episode: "Delusions of Murder"
1998	Baywatch	Mom	Episode: "The Natural"
2000	An American Daughter	Greta	Feature film
2001	Gangland	Mary Anne Adams	Feature film
