= Perry Mason (TV film series) =

Television movies (1985–1995)

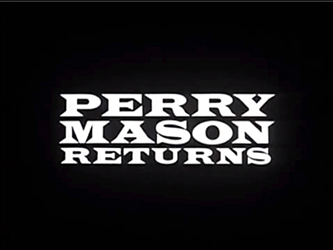
- Title card of the first entry, Perry Mason Returns
- Based on: Characters created by Erle Stanley Gardner
- Starring: Raymond Burr; Barbara Hale; William Katt; William R. Moses; David Ogden Stiers; James McEachin; Paul Sorvino; Hal Holbrook
- Theme music composer: Fred Steiner; Dick DeBenedictis
- Opening theme: "Park Avenue Beat"
- Country of origin: United States
- Original language: English

Production
- Executive producers: Dean Hargrove; Fred Silverman
- Producers: Jeff Peters; Joel Steiger; Barry Steinberg
- Camera setup: Single-camera
- Running time: 2,897 minutes
- Production companies: Intermedia Entertainment Company (1985–86); Strathmore Productions (1985–88); The Fred Silverman Company (1987–1995); Dean Hargrove Productions (1988–1995); Viacom Productions (1985–1995)

Original release
- Network: NBC
- Release: December 1, 1985 – April 10, 1995

Related
- Perry Mason (1957–1966)

A series of 30 Perry Mason television films aired on NBC from 1985 to 1995 as sequels to the CBS TV series Perry Mason. After a hiatus of nearly 20 years, Raymond Burr reprised his role as Los Angeles defense attorney Mason in 26 of the television films. Following Burr's death in 1993, Paul Sorvino and Hal Holbrook starred in the remaining television films that aired from 1993 to 1995, with Sorvino playing lawyer Anthony Caruso in the first of these and Holbrook playing "Wild Bill" McKenzie in the last three.

== Production ==
=== Development ===
The original Perry Mason television series was broadcast on CBS television from 1957 to 1966. Raymond Burr starred as Los Angeles criminal defense lawyer Perry Mason, a character created by American author and attorney Erle Stanley Gardner. Television producer Dean Hargrove resurrected the Perry Mason character in a series of television films for NBC beginning in 1985.

=== Casting ===
Dean Hargrove was able to bring back the two then-surviving major stars, Raymond Burr and Barbara Hale, reprising their roles as Mason and his private secretary Della Street. In the first telefilm, Perry Mason Returns, Mason resigns from his position as an appellate court judge to defend Street on a murder charge. William Katt, Hale's own son, was cast as private investigator Paul Drake, Jr., the son of original series' private investigator Paul Drake. William Hopper, who played Drake, had died in 1970; his photograph appears on Paul Drake Jr.'s desk. Katt appeared in the first nine movies before being dropped from the series.

In the later TV movies, Mason utilizes the services of Ken Malansky (William R. Moses), an attorney who works with him as a private investigator. Malansky is introduced in The Case of the Lethal Lesson (1989) as a law student who is defended by Mason on a murder charge.

Among the actors to appear in major recurring roles were David Ogden Stiers as District Attorney Michael Reston (1986–1988), James McEachin as police Sergeant (later Lieutenant) Ed Brock (1986–1995), and Alexandra Paul as Ken Malansky's girlfriend Amy Hastings (1989).

=== Filming ===
Budgeted at $3 million, Perry Mason Returns was filmed in Toronto, standing in for Los Angeles to save production costs. The second telefilm, The Case of the Notorious Nun, was filmed in Vancouver, while the third, The Case of the Shooting Star, was also filmed in Toronto. Because of lower production costs, many of the later TV movies (beginning with the fourth, The Case of the Lost Love) were filmed and set in Denver, Colorado rather than Mason's traditional locale of Los Angeles. Although located in Colorado, a courtroom wall shown at the end of the opening title sequence bears a Seal of Los Angeles County, California plaque.

=== Music ===
Fred Steiner's theme music was re-recorded by composer Dick DeBenedictis; Steiner himself arranged the theme at DeBenedictis's request.

=== After Burr's death ===
A total of 30 movies were made between 1985 and 1995, with Burr starring in 26. After Burr died in 1993, Paul Sorvino and Hal Holbrook starred in the final four telefilms from 1993 to 1995. These four films were presented as A Perry Mason Mystery, with Sorvino starring as Anthony Caruso in the first film and Holbrook starring as Bill "Wild Bill" McKenzie in the remaining three. Their characters are introduced as both colourful lawyers and close friends of Mason, who is ostensibly out of town. Both Barbara Hale and William R. Moses reprised their roles for all four films, although in the final film in 1995, Hale contributed only a small cameo with Holland Taylor substituting for her.

Hale said that continuing the series was suggested by Burr. "Raymond was so concerned that the crew keep working - we'd been with the same crew for six years. He felt we must keep going as long as the audience was as kind to us as they are. It's the show that will keep going, but not the character. I do think it's a sweet memorial."

== Television films ==
=== Raymond Burr films ===
No.	Title	Directed by	Written by	Original release date
1	Perry Mason Returns	Ron Satlof	Dean Hargrove	December 1, 1985
Della Street, now the secretary of a wealthy businessman, is framed for her boss' murder. To defend her, Perry Mason resigns from his position as an appellate judge and becomes a defense attorney again. First appearance of William Katt as Paul Drake, Jr., the son of Perry's old investigator. Cast: Patrick O'Neal, Holland Taylor, Richard Anderson, Kerrie Keane, Al Freeman Jr., David McIlwraith, Roberta Weiss, Cassie Yates
2	Perry Mason: The Case of the Notorious Nun	Ron Satlof	Joel Steiger	May 25, 1986
A young priest, brought in by the archbishop to look for signs of embezzlement in the archdiocese, is found stabbed in his hotel room. Sister Margaret, a young nun who has been assisting him, is accused of the murder. The archbishop asks old friend Perry Mason, already secretly assisting in the financial investigation, to defend Sister Margaret. Cast: Arthur Hill, Tom Bosley, Barbara Parkins, Michele Greene, Timothy Bottoms, Jon Cypher, Edward Winter; James McEachin, Gerald S. O'Laughlin; William Prince, David Ogden Stiers Note: David Ogden Stiers and James McEachin make their regular-cast debuts as D.A. Michael Reston and Sergeant Ed Brock, respectively. Tom Bosley, playing a priest and possible murder witness, would later star as a crime-solving priest in the long-running Father Dowling Mysteries (1987–1990), co-developed by Perry Mason movie producer Dean Hargrove.
3	Perry Mason: The Case of the Shooting Star	Ron Satlof	Anne C. Collins	November 9, 1986
Jealous of the time actress Kate Huntley is spending with talk-show host Steve Carr, actor/director Robert McCay decides to "prank" him by shooting at him on his show on live television with a gun loaded with blanks. However, the gun is loaded with live ammo, and Carr is unwittingly killed. Producer Sidney (last name not given) recruits old law school friend Perry Mason to defend McCay, but Mason, a personal friend of Carr's wife, is worried about conflict of interest. Cast: Jennifer O'Neill, Joe Penny, Ron Glass, Alan Thicke, Ivan Dixon, Wendy Crewson, Ross Petty, Lisa Howard, J. Kenneth Campbell, Lee Wilkof, Bryan Genesse, Cec Linder
4	Perry Mason: The Case of the Lost Love	Ron Satlof	Anne Collins	February 23, 1987
An old flame of Mason's, Laura Robertson, is to fill a vacated government position. Her husband Glenn is approached by a man who says he knows his wife had a nervous breakdown seven years prior. The husband, believing mental illness is something to be stigmatized, foolishly allows himself to be blackmailed, believing if his wife's former medical condition should ever be released, her appointment will not go through. When the husband goes to the man with the blackmail money, the husband finds him dead, and he is arrested for the crime and tried. Cast: Jean Simmons, Gene Barry, Robert Mandan, Robert Walden, Stephen Elliot, Robert F. Lyons, Gordon Jump, Jonathan Banks, Stephanie Dunnam, Leslie Wing
5	Perry Mason: The Case of the Sinister Spirit	Richard Lang	Anne Collins	May 24, 1987
Perry defends publisher Jordan White when he is accused of murdering his publishing house's top client, mystery author David Hall, during a visit to Hall's Denver estate along with several other invited guests of the author. Hall, before his death, had played a series of cruel tricks on his guests which included an alleged psychic, an aging B-movie actress, and a questionable tarot reader, all of whom, along with Jordan, had inspired the characters in Hall's latest book. Claiming his tricks were about forcing them to confront their sins and lies, Hall's acts may have provoked one of the guests to murder him instead. Also under suspicion is Hall's own assistant Andrew Lloyd, who had secretly planned to publish an exposé on his employer. Cast: Robert Stack, Dwight Schultz, Kim Delaney, Dennis Lipscomb, Jack Bannon, Leigh Taylor-Young, Matthew Faison
6	Perry Mason: The Case of the Murdered Madam	Ron Satlof	Patricia Green	October 4, 1987
Della meets up with an old friend, a child that she used to baby-sit, and she and Perry are invited to meet the friend's new wife, Suzanne. Meanwhile, Suzanne rents out her house to four gentlemen who are having a meeting about a plan that could get them all rich - little realizing that Suzanne is taping the whole conversation. Suzanne holds out for more money from her "client" before giving up the tape and is found murdered and the tape gone. As Perry, Della and Paul start to help the friend (who discovered the body and is hence the prime suspect), they discover that Suzanne used to be a Madam of a "certain kind of house", that the four "meeting" takes great pains to cover up their business and that Suzanne's past may have caught up with her. Cast: Daphne Ashbrook, Vincent Baggetta, Jason Bernard, Anthony Geary, Bill Macy, James Noble, John Rhys-Davies, Ann Jillian, Kim Johnston Ulrich Note: Beginning with this movie, due to his poor health, Raymond Burr's physical activity became limited to sitting, standing while holding onto something, or taking a few steps with the assistance of crutches. In this film, his limited movements and use of crutches are explained by Perry having injured his knee while skiing. His mobility would improve slightly for some of the later movies, but by the time of his final Mason movie in 1993, Burr, by then dying of cancer, was confined entirely to seating or leaning onto something due to the pain.
7	Perry Mason: The Case of the Scandalous Scoundrel	Christian I. Nyby II	Anthony Spinner	November 15, 1987
Perry is suing a gutter-trash newspaper that is running a story about a love affair between him and Della. The editor, Harlan Wade, also has "dirt" files on an Army General, his banker, and other "clients". All of them make little-concealed verbal threats to Wade at a party, but the person who hated him most is a female reporter he had just fired from the paper for attempting to write a serious story. Soon after she threatens him, he is found floating in his pool, shot. The reporter is arrested for the crime and Perry, who has a personal stake in the matter, sets out with Della and Paul to solve the mystery. However, the other suspects just want the case to be over and will go to any lengths to protect their pasts and their secrets. Cast: Robert Guillaume, Morgan Brittany, Eugene Butler, René Enríquez, George Grizzard, Wings Hauser, Yaphet Kotto, Susan Wilder
8	Perry Mason: The Case of the Avenging Ace	Christian I. Nyby II	Lee David Zlotoff	February 28, 1988
During his time as an appellate judge, Perry Mason had overseen the appeal of Air Force Col. Kevin Parks, convicted of the murder of Amy Beth Sawyer, the wife of a fellow airman whom Parks was rumored to have had an affair with. Despite the appeal being denied, Perry notes reservations, so when Parks receives a second chance at appeal, Perry, by then having returned to law practice, is invited to consult with Parks' attorney and a new witness who can exonerate the Colonel. However, in an elaborate scheme, the witness is murdered, Parks is kidnapped during a police escort, and he is later found in the middle of the road, with the murder weapon in his hand. Taking the case over from Parks' attorney, Perry immediately suspects that not only is Parks innocent of both murders, but that Amy Beth's real killer planned the whole scheme to ruin Parks' certain chance at being cleared. With the same figures involved in Parks' first murder trial still around, not only original suspects and witnesses, but D.A Michael Reston and Sergeant Ed Brock, Perry finds himself, in a sense, running two trials to solve two murders, with one man's life and freedom on the line. Cast: Patty Duke, Erin Gray, Larry Wilcox, Charles Siebert, James Sutorius, Arthur Taxier, Don Galloway, Richard Sanders, Gary Hershberger Note: This film marked a reunion between Raymond Burr and his Ironside co-star, Don Galloway. Galloway would also have a role in The Case of The Defiant Daughter before both he and Burr would reprise their roles in the 1993 reunion film The Return of Ironside. This film, through a flashback opening, also marks the only instance of Perry in his previous line of work as an appellate judge, before the events of Perry Mason Returns led to him stepping down from the position and returning to law practice.
9	Perry Mason: The Case of the Lady in the Lake	Ron Satlof	Shel Willens	May 15, 1988
Sara Travis, haunted by the murder of her sister in the lake near her home 15 years earlier, has only just been rebuilding her life, thanks to her husband Billy, a former athlete. When Sara suddenly disappears and is presumed murdered in that very lake, a presumed case of history repeating itself takes hold. Billy, found at the scene of the crime (based on a phone tip), is accused of the murder. Perry, taking the case from Sara's sick uncle, finds that many in Sara's circle, including her own family, had good reasons to frame Billy beyond just the belief that he only married Sara for her family's large fortune. Paul Drake. Jr, meanwhile, is sent to search for a red-haired woman who had tried to flirt with Billy the night before the crime, while Perry investigates whether Sara's and Billy's plans to sell the family's mining business and build a ski resort were a motive for killing her. Cast: David Hasselhoff, John Beck, Doran Clark, George Deloy, John Ireland, Audra Lindley, Darrell Larson, Liane Langland Note: William Katt's and David Ogden Stiers's final appearances as Paul Drake, Jr. and D.A. Michael Reston, respectively. In the case of the latter, rather than replace Stiers, there would be a succession of rotating prosecutors for the remaining movies, played by various guest stars, including Harry Lennix, Bob Gunton, Valerie Mahaffey, Scott Baio, and Paul Dooley. Some, like Mahaffey, would log in at least two entries, but most would only appear in one movie each.
10	Perry Mason: The Case of the Lethal Lesson	Christian I. Nyby II	Robert Hamilton	February 12, 1989
William R. Moses makes his debut as Perry's co-counsel and legman Ken Malansky, who is introduced as a law student who seeks Perry's help when he is accused of murdering one of his classmates in a law class Perry is teaching. Alexandra Paul also makes her first of three appearances as Ken's wealthy ex-girlfriend Amy Hastings, who tries in her own way to help Ken clear his name. Cast: Brian Keith, Alexandra Paul, Leslie Ackerman, Richard Allen, John DeMita, Brian Backer, Karen Kopins, John LaMotta, Charley Lang, John Allen Nelson, Mark Rolston, Raye Birk, Marlene Warfield
11	Perry Mason: The Case of the Musical Murder	Christian I. Nyby II	George Eckstein	April 9, 1989
While recovering in hospital from a knee operation, Perry notices through a window Johnny Whitcomb, an ex-stage manager for a musical called Polly. While the star, film actress Amanda Cody, is scoring a big success, director Tony Franken is dictatorially tearing through the cast and crew, dismissing Johnny after he dares to stand up for himself. That night, Tony gets a phone call, goes down to the theatre and is shot. The police arrest Johnny and when Perry comes forward with the alibi Amanda begs Perry to represent Johnny. While Perry and Della investigate the murder, Ken and his fiancée Amy investigate the theatre's security guard Parker Newton, a huge man with a very nasty temper who has the key to solving the murder. Cast: Debbie Reynolds, Jerry Orbach, Dwight Schultz, Alexandra Paul, Luis Ávalos, Mary Cadorette, Lori Petty Note: In this episode, it is revealed that Sergeant Ed Brock (James McEachin) has been promoted to Lieutenant.
12	Perry Mason: The Case of the All-Star Assassin	Christian I. Nyby II	Robert Hamilton	November 19, 1989
Thatcher Horton owns a Denver sports arena and a couple of sports teams. Bobby Spencer, a friend of Ken, was one of his hockey players. Horton seemingly promised him that he would take care of him if he was injured. Feeling that Horton is reneging, Bobby, who has asked Ken to represent him, threatens Horton, who is killed not long afterwards, and when the murder weapon is found in Bobby's possession, Perry comes to help defend Bobby. It seems that Horton was not liked by other people including his wife and son, and it also seems that the killer was a professional assassin, so did one of them hire him? Cast: Deidre Hall, Bruce Greenwood, Shari Belafonte, Pernell Roberts, Alexandra Paul, Jason Beghe Note: Alexandra Paul's last appearance as Amy Hastings.
13	Perry Mason: The Case of the Poisoned Pen	Christian I. Nyby II	George Eckstein	January 21, 1990
Famous crime writer Bradley Thompson is in town to collect an award for his latest book. However, he is also a fraud, taking information, book plots and sometimes the entire book from other people and getting them published under his own name, and then enjoying the credit when they become bestsellers. While most of his victims have become famous writers in their own right, Bradley, in collecting his award, successfully offends all of them. During the party after the award ceremony, Bradley is poisoned and his ex-wife is framed for the crime, who calls in Perry, Della and Ken to investigate. Cast: Cindy Williams, Barbara Babcock, Kiel Martin, Tony Lo Bianco, David Warner
14	Perry Mason: The Case of the Desperate Deception	Christian I. Nyby II	George Eckstein	March 11, 1990
U.S. Marine David Berman manages to get himself transferred to Paris to search for a hidden Nazi, Krugman, that had killed his grandparents and crippled his mother. He manages to find a witness but just after they talk, she is run over and killed. That night, he is kidnapped by a shadowy organization and told that Krugman is hiding under the new identity of Felix Altmann. David goes to a health spa and meets Altmann, but Altmann is shot and David is framed for the crime. As an old friend of the family, Perry goes to France to help out, but now not only does that involve freeing David, but he must also discover secrets that have been kept hidden for over 45 years and for which certain people are still more than willing to kill. Cast: Ian Bannen, Ian McShane, Yvette Mimieux, Terry O'Quinn, Marcy Walker, Teresa Wright, Paul Freeman
15	Perry Mason: The Case of the Silenced Singer	Ron Satlof	Anne Collins	May 20, 1990
Terri Knight is one of the biggest superstars in music, but success had come at a cost for her and those close to her. Displaying a diva status has driven a wedge between not only her and her bandmates but with her own manager and husband Jack Barnett. When Terri is murdered in her penthouse by a hired hitman, Jack is immediately suspected of arranging the hit, but his former law professor Perry takes the case. Among the other suspects are Terri's former friend Carla Peters, who started out with her when they were singing in a Supremes-like trio; her ex-husband, who sang with her in a husband-and-wife duo in her early days before she left him, and various others. Ken, meanwhile, goes undercover to get info from a singer who is the only tie to the unknown hitman. In the end, Perry believes the key to the case lies in the claim by all involved that Terri had changed from the sweet person they all knew into somebody different. Cast: Tim Reid, Alan Rachins, Vanessa Williams, Angela Bassett, Alice Ghostley, Kene Holliday, Nia Peeples Note: Kene Holliday, playing Terri's former husband, had previously been a cast member on the hit series Matlock, created by Perry Mason movie producers Dean Hargrove and Fred Silverman.
16	Perry Mason: The Case of the Defiant Daughter	Christian I. Nyby II	Anne Collins	September 30, 1990
Richard Stuart is a very wealthy man, thanks to his methods of "assisting" certain people to advance in their careers. However, he is blackmailing all of his clients and invites them every now and then to a poker game in Las Vegas, through which he gets his money from them. David Benson's brother was killed thanks to one of Richard's schemes and during one of the "poker" parties, David bursts in with a gun and attempts to shoot Richard but is overpowered and thrown out. Later on that night, Richard is shot with David's gun and David is arrested for the crime. David's young daughter Melanie had followed her father to Las Vegas and when David is arrested runs to Perry who is in town for a boxing match with Ken. Perry knows of Richard's methods and as he wants to know the truth sets out with Della and Ken to solve the mystery but Melanie wants to help too and gets herself in major trouble with one of the suspects. Cast: Jere Burns, Robert Culp, Ken Kercheval, Kevin Tighe, Robert Vaughn, Don Galloway, Jenny Lewis
17	Perry Mason: The Case of the Ruthless Reporter	Christian I. Nyby II	Sean Cholodenko	January 6, 1991
Perry is at TV station "KGGY" to be interviewed but thanks to the interference of main anchor-person Brett Huston the interview is pulled. Mostly everybody hates Brett as he knows all the station workers' secrets and has also written a memo insulting all of the main station players: Vic St. John, the station manager; Twyla Cooper, the producer; Chuck Gilmore, the sports reporter; Gary Slate, the weatherman; Cassie Woodfield, the reporter; and Gillian Pope. Brett is shot dead with Gillian's gun and therefore she is arrested for the crime. Gillian calls in Perry, Della and Ken to investigate. As Della and Perry set out to solve the mystery, Ken gets close to Cassie but she is a suspect and when it appears that somebody is trying to kill her, the mystery deepens. Cast: John James, Jerry Orbach, Susan Sullivan, Philip Michael Thomas, Kerrie Keane, Mary Page Keller
18	Perry Mason: The Case of the Maligned Mobster	Ron Satlof	Sean Cholodenko	February 11, 1991
With strong reservations, and against the wishes of both Della and especially Ken, Perry agrees to defend former mob figure Johnny Sorrento when he is accused of ordering a hit on his wife, who was threatening to divorce him. With several businesses, including a movie studio, under his watch, Sorrento claims that he is legitimate and that his less-than-reputable past is behind him, but others are less convinced. Perry, meanwhile, has his eye on other suspects, including a restaurateur feeling owed by Johnny, and a mystery woman whose unwarranted advances on Johnny had triggered his wife's jealousy just before her death. Perry soon realizes that finding the real killer may depend on Johnny's estranged son and a previous unsolved murder from years back that Johnny may have been involved in. Cast: Mason Adams, Paul Anka, Michael Nader, Anne Schedeen, Pamela Bowen, Sean Kanan, Stephen Tobolowsky Note: Future The Young and the Restless star Sean Kanan, playing Johnny Sorrento's son, would later have the distinction of playing the final murder victim investigated by Perry in Raymond Burr's final Perry Mason movie, The Case of The Killer Kiss, in 1993.
19	Perry Mason: The Case of the Glass Coffin	Christian I. Nyby II	Brian Clemens	May 14, 1991
Internationally renowned magician David Katz comes to Denver with his group to perform for a charity gala for disabled children, attended by Perry and Della, who support the charity. His arrogant assistant Kate Ford tells David that she is, from now on, going to do an illusion in which an assistant is raised in a glass coffin only to disappear when the coffin is opened up in the air (while the assistant climbs out before the coffin is raised). After a one night stand with David, Kate is pregnant and blackmails David, who is unable to have children with his wife Judy, creating the rest of the group to vehemently loathe her. At the gala, the glass coffin is raised but when it opens Kate's dead body falls to the ground - strangled. Cast: Peter Scolari, Nancy Lee Grahn, John Karlen, Dennis Lipscomb, Julie Sommars, Kim Braden, Bob Gunton, Kate Vernon
20	Perry Mason: The Case of the Fatal Fashion	Christian I. Nyby II	Robert Janes	September 24, 1991
Dyan Draper, editor of a well-known fashion magazine, is infamous for writing columns that destroy other people's careers; she also drives her employees to near-madness with her orders. Lauren Jeffreys, editor of another magazine, meets with Dyan and tries unsuccessfully to stop Dyan from writing about her in her next column. She tries again at Dyan's place, but Dyan is next seen dead on the floor. Lauren is the prime suspect, but as she's friends with Della and Perry, Perry takes the defense. Lauren gave birth at 16 and the child grew up to be Julia Collier, Dyan's private assistant, and Lauren and Julia try to reunite. Meanwhile, Ken comes up against Albert Nardone, infamous crime mobster and little-known fashion designer, as Nardone's nephew gets killed by Dyan's killer and unwillingly has one of Nardone's hoods "assist" him in searching for the killer. Cast: Valerie Harper, Diana Muldaur, Scott Baio, Robert Clohessy, George DiCenzo
21	Perry Mason: The Case of the Fatal Framing	Christian I. Nyby II	Sean Cholodenko	March 1, 1992
Recently-deceased painter Truman York turns up alive when paintings supposedly painted by him appear. He goes to the gallery where they're being sold and slashes them, before going to his dealer to find out where these paintings are coming from. Later, a man whose wife was killed in the accident that he was supposedly killed in shows up looking for him. He goes to his wife and asks her to let him stay in her apartment; later he is killed. The man is arrested and he calls his friend Ken Malansky for help, and Ken calls Perry. Once Perry agrees to solve the case, he finds that his chief suspect is a photographer who may have been looking to cash in on the name of a dead celebrity. Cast: Jane Carr, Maureen Mueller, John Rhys-Davies, Scott Valentine, David Soul
22	Perry Mason: The Case of the Reckless Romeo	Christian I. Nyby II	Brian Clemens	May 5, 1992
Sleazy talk show host Ted Mayne writes a tell-all book, which enrages and embarrasses several very prominent women. One of them, actress Roxanne Shield, loses her composure during an interview and winds up making a televised death threat. When Ted is latter murdered, she is arrested. Witnesses claim they saw Roxanne outside his apartment that night and police later find the murder weapon in her car. Renowned defence attorney Perry Mason accepts the challenge of defending her in court. Cast: Geraldo Rivera, Tracy Nelson, Priscilla Barnes, Anjanette Comer, Vonetta McGee, Amy Steel, Robin Tunney
23	Perry Mason: The Case of the Heartbroken Bride	Christian I. Nyby II	Brian Clemens	October 30, 1992
During the wedding ceremony of fashionable pop star Kaitlynn Parrish, a heated altercation between a drunken woman and her father breaks out, disrupting the festivities. When the uncle is found murdered and Parrish is fingered as the suspect, Perry enlists Della and Ken to help him uncover the truth. Cast: Ronny Cox, Linda Blair, Paul Dooley, Diane Baker, Brian MacNamara, Stephen Stills
24	Perry Mason: The Case of the Skin-Deep Scandal	Christian I. Nyby II	Robert Schlitt	February 19, 1993
Alana Westbrook, a maverick owner of a cosmetics company, is unveiling a new cream which she claims she's been using. Having previously concealed her age, she reveals she is 60 years old, crediting the cream for her youthful appearance. After she is later murdered and the formula goes missing, her husband Arthur is arrested and Perry defends him. Cast: Carmen Argenziano, Scott Thompson Baker, Jonathan Banks, Polly Bergen, Morgan Fairchild, Michael Halsey, Tippi Hedren, David Warner, Patrick O'Neal
25	Perry Mason: The Case of the Telltale Talk Show Host	Christian I. Nyby II	Joyce Burditt	May 21, 1993
Dr. Sheila Carlin, a radio psychologist and old friend of Della's, asks for Perry's help when she is being pestered by someone. Theorizing that it could be one of her co-workers at the radio station, she arranges for Perry to be interviewed by the station's owner Winslow Keene, whom she suspects of being behind the harassment. Winslow, meanwhile, enrages the rest of the talk show hosts at the station by informing them of changes that he is making to their time slots. That night, Winslow is shot by a hitman hired by someone at the station and Sheila is set up for the murder. Taking on the case with Della and Ken, Perry finds out that Keene's power over the station came from various secrets he had over his stars, including a shock-jock duo, a conspiracy theorist, a former athlete turned sports show host, and a relationship expert. Meanwhile, Ken teams up with an undercover cop as they search for the hired gunman, which might depend on finding a mystery woman from the cop's past. Cast: Fritz Coleman, Cristina Ferrare, G. Gordon Liddy, Fred Roggin, Montel Williams, Mariette Hartley, Regis Philbin Note: This was the last Perry Mason movie aired during Raymond Burr's lifetime. In addition, the film aired 17 days after Burr was seen reprising his other long-running TV character, wheelchair-using detective Robert Ironside, in The Return of Ironside, which also aired on NBC.
26	Perry Mason: The Case of the Killer Kiss	Christian I. Nyby II	Gerry Conway	November 29, 1993
When Mark Stranton, a popular soap opera actor, dies from an on-camera kiss, which triggered an allergic reaction, Perry's goddaughter Kris Buckner, the victim's co-star who had planted the deadly kiss, is framed. Taking on her defense, Mason finds that nearly the whole show's cast and crew had good reason to kill Stranton, for reasons varying from a publicity stunt involving marriage to one of his co-stars to his role in a staff member's abortion. Meanwhile, Ken, with help from a visiting tourist, finds his life in danger as he and Perry suspect that the clue to Stranton's death might lie in an unsolved 28-year-old murder. Cast: Stuart Damon, Linda Dano, Genie Francis, Arleen Sorkin, Michael Tylo Note: This was the last film to be filmed with Raymond Burr prior to his death; it was aired posthumously two and a half months after his passing. An in-memory note appeared at the end of the film. By the time of filming, Burr's struggle with kidney cancer was debilitating enough that, throughout the movie, Perry is shown either seated or leaning on a table for support. He is seen moving briefly only once, unassisted, for a few seconds.

=== A Perry Mason Mystery ===
No.	Title	Directed by	Written by	Original release date
27	A Perry Mason Mystery: The Case of the Wicked Wives	Christian I. Nyby II	Joyce Burditt	December 17, 1993
Note: To address the death of Raymond Burr, Perry Mason is addressed as being out of town, or unavailable in general, for the remaining films. After a photo shoot featuring his exes, fashion photographer David Morrison is blinded by camera flashes and stabbed with a sword. His current wife, Dee who arranged the shoot, is accused of the crime. Beforehand, to oversee legal issues regarding both the shoot and the women involved, Dee had asked for help from a friend of hers, attorney Anthony Caruso, who had overseen each of the exes' divorces. Caruso, borrowing his friend Perry Mason's office while Perry is away, soon goes from overseeing a photo shoot to handling a murder case. With Della and Ken's help, Caruso digs into past secrets of David's marriages, which make all his exes prime suspects. Starring Paul Sorvino as Anthony Caruso. Cast: Shelley Hack, Kathy Ireland, Maud Adams, Beverly Johnson, Kim Alexis, Paula Marshall, Eric Braeden
28	A Perry Mason Mystery: The Case of the Lethal Lifestyle	Helaine Head	Bruce Franklin Singer, Joyce Burdit	May 10, 1994
For the remainder of the series, Hal Holbrook takes over as "Wild Bill" McKenzie, a motorcycle-riding ranch owner and former prosecutor, whose reputation in the courtroom has led to a series of colorful stories spread around about him, from him getting a confession by threatening to shoot the accused's dog to, at the movie's start, exposing a corrupt defense attorney working against his own client. When he agrees to fill in for Perry as a guest speaker at a lavish resort, he quickly finds himself coming to the defense of an old friend of his, retired chess star Daniel Kingman. Kingman is accused of murdering trashy tabloid host Adrian Lye, who had proof that Kingman had thrown one of his last matches. As Will Bill, with help from Della and Ken, gets to work, they soon find out Lye had dirt on many of the guests gathered at the hotel, including a basketball team owner, an aging actress, and a has-been director. Starring Hal Holbrook as "Wild Bill" McKenzie. Cast: Robin Leach, Dixie Carter, Diahann Carroll, Robert Englund, James Stephens Note: This film marks a reunion between Hal Holbrook and his wife, actress Dixie Carter, playing one of the suspects. Holbrook had previously had a recurring role in Carter's series Designing Women.
29	A Perry Mason Mystery: The Case of the Grimacing Governor	Max Tash	Robert Schlitt	November 9, 1994
"Wild Bill" McKenzie had, months earlier, faced tragedy when a friend of his, former D.A. Harlan Richards allegedly committed suicide. Richards, running for governor, had seen his campaign damaged by rumors of his having an affair with Charlotte Moore, an exotic dancer who was seeking hush money. Richards' daughter Karen, is convinced that both the accusations and her father's death were planned and ordered by Harlan's opponent, sitting governor Ryan Allison. Allison, after a fiery confrontation with Karen at his office, invites her to meet with him, claiming that he wants to investigate Harlan's death. Karen arrives that night to find him dead from a stabbing. Taking on her defense, Bill, with the help of his ranch guests Della and Ken, starts digging into motive and soon finds secrets not only among Allison's administration but even from Allison's wife, who already poses a threat to Karen's defense by her claiming to have left her husband alive just minutes before Karen arrived. Added into the mix is not only blackmailer Charlotte Moore, who has been suspiciously missing since the governor's murder, but also local corrupt businessman Johnny Steele, who may have a member of Allison's team on his payroll. Starring Hal Holbrook as "Wild Bill" McKenzie Cast: Tony Curtis, Ken Kercheval, James Brolin, Deborah Raffin, John Spencer, Gregg Henry, Bonnie Bartlett, Kim Johnston Ulrich, Elyssa Davalos
30	A Perry Mason Mystery: The Case of the Jealous Jokester	Vincent McEveety	Gerry Conway	April 10, 1995
Bill McKenzie's niece works as a production assistant for controversial television personality Josie Joplin, who publicly accuses her of having an affair with her husband. One night McKenzie's niece receives a message which she believes is from Josie to go to her hotel room, when she gets there someone knocks her out and when she wakes up, Josie is dead and she's the number one suspect, so McKenzie defends her. Starring Hal Holbrook as "Wild Bill" McKenzie Cast: Tony Roberts, Victoria Jackson, David Rasche, Dyan Cannon, Susan Diol, Holland Taylor, Tina Yothers Note: Barbara Hale, for her final appearance as Della Street, only appears in a cameo. Her departure is explained by having Della leave town to help Perry on a case in Europe. Holland Taylor, playing Della's fill-in assistant, had co-starred as one of the prime suspects in the first Mason movie, Perry Mason Returns, 10 years prior. That gave Taylor and Hale the distinction of being the only two actors to have appeared in both the first and last Perry Mason movies of any kind.

== Reception ==
Perry Mason Returns, the first television film in the series, was the second-highest-rated TV movie in American television during the 1985–86 season.

=== Awards ===
- 1988: Perry Mason: The Case of the Avenging Ace received a nomination for Outstanding Achievement in Music Composition for a Miniseries or a Special (Dramatic Underscore) at the 40th Primetime Emmy Awards. The composer was Dick DeBenedictis.
- 1990: Perry Mason: The Case of the Silenced Singer was nominated for Outstanding Achievement in Music and Lyrics at the 42nd Primetime Emmy Awards, for a song composed by Dick DeBenedictis.

== In popular culture ==
The British sitcom May to December (1989–1994) shows a photograph of Perry Mason (Raymond Burr) in the office of Scottish solicitor Alec Callender. The "signed" photograph reads:- "Cheers Alec, let's crack open a case sometime. Perry".

== Home media ==
All 30 Perry Mason television films are available on Region 1 DVD. They were released in five six-film sets that were initially available exclusively through Amazon.com. On June 7, 2016, the first four movie collections were given general retail release.

DVD set	TV movies	Release date	Notes
Volume 1	1–6	December 31, 2013	
Volume 2	7–12	May 13, 2014	
Volume 3	13–18	August 5, 2014	
Volume 4	19–24	October 7, 2014	
Volume 5	25–30	March 22, 2016	
Complete Movie Collection	1–30	August 9, 2016	
