= The Dare =

The Dare may refer to:

== Music ==
- The Dare (musician), stage name of Harrison Patrick Smith
- "The Dare", a song on the album Treehouse by Sofi Tukker

== Television ==
- "The Dare", an episode of the TV program Matlock

== Film ==
- The Dare (film), 2019 film directed by Giles Alderson

== Other ==
- The Dictionary of American Regional English, or DARE
- "The Dare", a ghost story written by Maria Leach that had similar plot elements to The Twilight Zone episode "The Grave"
