= Verdict (disambiguation) =

In law, a verdict is the formal finding of fact made by a jury.

Verdict or The Verdict may also refer to:

== Arts, entertainment, and media ==
=== Characters ===
- Verdict (comics), a fictional superhero team

=== Films ===
- The Verdict (1925 film), an American mystery silent film directed by Fred Windemere
- The Verdict (1946 film), an American film noir directed by Don Siegel
- The Verdict (1959 film), a French drama directed by Jean Valère
- The Verdict (1964 film), a British crime drama film, part of the Edgar Wallace Mysteries series
- The Verdict (1982 film), an American film starring Paul Newman, directed by Sidney Lumet
- The Verdict (2013 film), a Belgian drama directed by Jan Verheyen
- The Verdict (2025 film), an Indian Tamil-language courtroom drama film
- Verdict (1974 film), a French-Italian drama starring Sophia Loren
- Verdict (2019 film), a Filipino film

=== Literature ===
- Verdict (play), a 1958 play by Agatha Christie
- The Verdict (1980), a novel by Barry Reed, basis for the 1982 film

=== Music ===
- The Verdict (The Jacka album), 2012
- The Verdict (Queensrÿche album), 2019
- Verdict, an EP by Bloodred Hourglass, 2009

=== Periodicals ===
- The Verdict, a magazine published by Justia
- The Verdict, the current-day Present Truth Magazine, an evangelical Christian periodical
- Verdict, a technology news website owned by GlobalData

=== Television ===
==== Series ====
- Verdict (TV series), a 1998 British series
- The Verdict (2007 TV series), a 2007 reality legal series
- The Verdict (Australian TV program), a 2015 Australian talk show

==== Episodes ====
- "The Verdict" (American Crime Story)
- "The Verdict" (Dynasty 1981)
- "The Verdict" (Dynasty 1984)
- "The Verdict" (Matlock)
- "The Verdict" (Modern Family)
