= Daniel Haller =

American film director (1929–2024)

- Born: September 14, 1929; Glendale, California, U.S.
- Died: December 14, 2024 (aged 95); Hidden Hills, California, U.S.
- Education: Chouinard Art Institute
- Occupations: Film director; art director; production designer
- Years active: 1952–1988
- Spouse: Kinta Zebal Haller

Daniel Haller (September 14, 1929 – December 18, 2024) was an American film, television director, production designer and art director.

== Life and career ==
Haller was born in Glendale, California on September 14, 1929. He studied at the Chouinard Art Institute in Los Angeles. In 1953, Haller started as an art director in television and then later made low budget feature films. Haller designed sets for Roger Corman's Edgar Allan Poe film series, including House of Usher (1960) and The Pit and the Pendulum (1961). Haller directed his first film, Die, Monster, Die!, in 1965 for American International Pictures, based on H. P. Lovecraft's short story "The Colour Out of Space". After directing two motorcycle pictures, Devil's Angels (1967) and The Wild Racers (1968), Haller filmed another Lovecraft adaptation, The Dunwich Horror (1970). That same year he directed his sole studio film, Pieces of Dreams(1970) starring Robert Forster and Lauren Hutton for United Artists. It was nominated for the Golden Globe and Academy Award for Best Original Song.

From 1972, all of Haller's subsequent work has been in television, including directing episodes of Night Gallery, Kojak, Sara, Battlestar Galactica, Buck Rogers in the 25th Century and the pilot episode of Knight Rider.

Haller died on December 18, 2024, at the age of 95.
