= Kene Holliday =

American actor (born 1949)

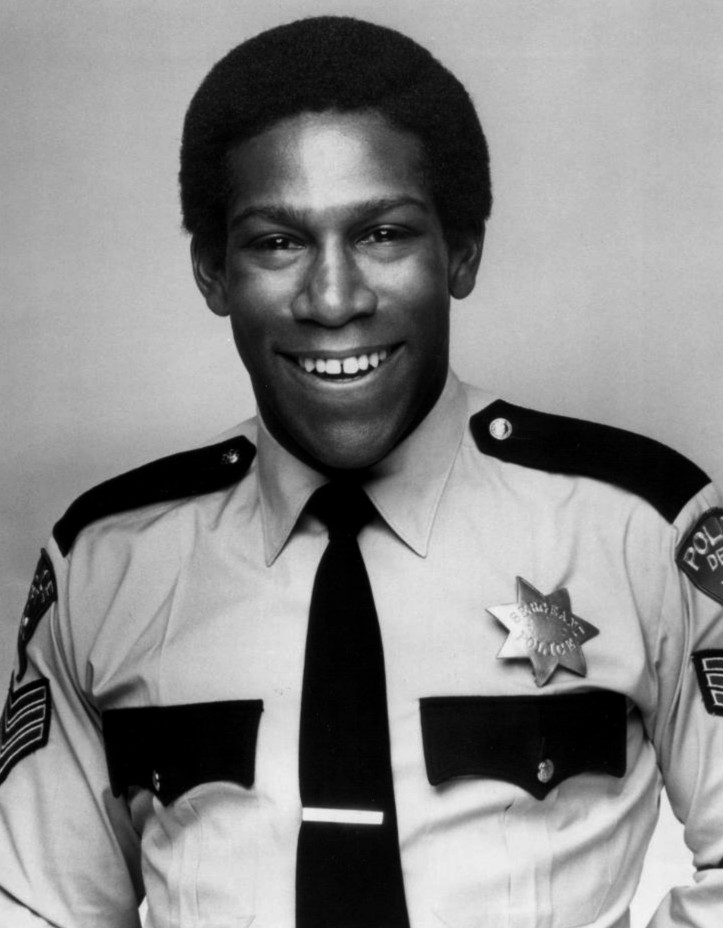
- Holliday as Curtis Baker in Carter Country in 1977
- Born: Kenneth Earl Holliday; June 25, 1949 (age 77); Copiague, Suffolk County, New York, U.S.
- Other name: Kene Holiday
- Occupation: Actor
- Years active: 1971–present
- Spouses: Janifer Baker Holloway; Darlene Collins; Linda Copling
- Children: 2 sons

Kenneth Earl Holliday (born June 25, 1949) is an American actor of stage, film, and television. He is known for his role as Ben Matlock's original private investigator, Tyler Hudson, on Matlock, and as Sgt. Curtis Baker on Carter Country from 1977 until 1979. He was nominated for the Independent Spirit Award for Best Supporting Male for his performance in the film Great World of Sound.

== Biography ==
Holliday, from the Copiague area of Long Island, New York, was raised in a Christian home, born into a Baptist family. At age 12, he lost his father. With the encouragement of his mother, he participated in track at Copiague High School where he was part of the Fantastic Four Relay Team and was the star of his football team. He was nicknamed as Mr. Hotshot and was known as a "scoring machine" on and off the football field. He graduated in 1967 and attended University of Maryland on a full scholarship. As he recalled, times were turbulent, and the football team was preparing to go on strike against the NCAA over a change in coaches.

He was "jazzed" by a class he took related to the history of theater and acting became his new passion. In 1969, as an undergraduate he played Yank in The Hairy Ape by Eugene O'Neill. He was the first black person to perform in a leading role on the college's "main stage."

After graduation from college his first work was with the Inaugural Theater Group at the Folger Shakespeare Library in Washington, D.C. There, he conducted workshops as a founding member of the D.C. Black Repertory Company. In 1975, he was fired from his job because of his continued problems with drugs and alcohol. His chemical abuse continued for the next 14 years. However, despite those problems he starred in the role of Carlyle in David Rabe's Vietnam War–era play Streamers at the Lincoln Theatre.

That play led him to Los Angeles in 1976 where he guest-starred on several shows such as Kojak; What's Happening!!; The Incredible Hulk; Quincy, M.E.; Lou Grant; Soap and its spin-off series, Benson; The Jeffersons; The Fall Guy; Hart to Hart and Doogie Howser, M.D. He guest starred on many other shows. His first "featuring" television series was Carter Country where he co-starred with Victor French as Sgt. Curtis Baker from 1977 until 1979. He also was featured in Roots: The Next Generations and starred in a series of pilots which failed to make it to the air as regular series. Kene provided the voice of the character Roadblock in the 1980s cartoon series, G.I. Joe and 1987's G.I. Joe: The Movie. In 1985, he appeared in the TV film Badge of the Assassin.

In early 1986, while providing the voice of Roadblock, he received a phone call from producers Fred Silverman and Dean Hargrove. He was their first choice to play Matlock's private investigator Tyler Hudson on the Matlock series opposite TV veteran Andy Griffith. Holliday said in a 2012 interview with Blake Radio that when he was 11 years old he occasionally watched The Andy Griffith Show; he had recognized all the characters from his mentor's show and won the Matlock role. He was eventually fired from the series due to ongoing concerns around his substance abuse.

== Other TV work and personal life ==
He has numerous television and movie appearances to his credit, including roles in G.I. Joe: The Movie (1987), CBS’s made-for-television movie Miracle on the Mountain (2000), Hope & Faith (2004), and Law & Order: Special Victims Unit (2005).

He published a book of poetry in 1998 entitled The Book of K-III: The Contemporary Poetics of Kene Holliday.

Following his departure from Matlock in 1989, Holliday became a traveling evangelist, and spent the next decade preaching in gospel musicals. Holliday married his wife, Linda Copling, on April 6, 1996.

In 2002, Holliday paused his work to became the round-the-clock caregiver for his mother, who has Alzheimer's disease and subsequently became a member of the Alzheimer's Foundation of America.

While taking care of his mother, he accepted the lead role in the movie Great World of Sound in 2007.

== Filmography ==
Year	Title	Role	Notes
1976	Kojak	Assistant D.A. Dunn	Episode: "A Shield For Murder" (parts 1 and 2)
1977–79	Carter Country	Sergeant Curtis Baker	44 episodes
1978	Incredible Hulk	Paul	Episode: "Earthquakes Happen"
1978	Battle of the Network Stars	Himself	Episode: "Battle of the Network Stars IV"
1978	What's Happening!!	The Gong Show Judge Himself	Episode: "Going, Going, Gong"
1979	Quincy M.E.	Father Tony Hamilton	Episode: "Never a Child"
1979	Roots: The Next Generations	Detroit	Miniseries; Part III
1980	Soap	Eddie Dawson	Episode 60
1980	Benson	Jake	Episode: "Takin' It to the Streets"
1981	See China and Die	Sgt. Alvin Sykes	Television film
1982	Hart to Hart	William Dean	Episode: "Hart and Sole" as William Dean
1982	Chicago Story	Dr. Jeff House	
1984	Benson	Earl (Benson's brother)	Episode: "The Reunion"
1984	The Philadelphia Experiment	Major Clark	
1984	No Small Affair	Walt Cronin	
1985	Badge of the Assassin	Albert Washington	Television film
1985–86	G.I. Joe: A Real American Hero	Roadblock (voice)	36 episodes
1986	Diary of a Perfect Murder	Tyler Hudson	Television film
1986	The Fall Guy	Lt. Joe Budd	Episode: "In His Shadow"
1986–90	Matlock	Tyler Hudson	seasons 1–3; appeared in episode 4 & 14 in season 4
1987	G.I. Joe: The Movie	Roadblock (voice)	Direct-to-video
1987	If It's Tuesday, It Still Must Be Belgium	Bon Sperling	Television film
1990	Perry Mason: Case of the Silenced Singer	Joe Dillon	
1991	The Josephine Baker Story	Sidney Bechet	Television film
1991	Doogie Howser, M.D.	Raymond's Old Mentor	Episode: "Truth and Consequences"
1992	Jake and the Fatman	Montgomery Dubois	Episode: "Ain't Misbehavin'"
1996:	Diagnosis Murder	Burke's Producer	Episode: "FMurder"
2005	Law & Order: Special Victims Unit	Coach Veneziano	Episode: "Ripped"
2007	Great World of Sound	Clarence	
2008	Law & Order: Criminal Intent	Cold Case Detective	Episode: "Last Rites"
2009	Grand Theft Auto: Episodes from Liberty City	Theodore the Saxophone Player	Videogame
2009	Everybody's Fine	Butcher	

== Accolades ==
- Gotham Awards
  - 2008: Breakthrough Actor: Great World of Sound (Nominated)
- Independent Spirit Award
  - 2008: Best Supporting Male: Great World of Sound (Nominated)
