= Charles S. Dubin =

American film and television director

- Born: February 1, 1919; New York, New York, U.S.
- Died: September 5, 2011 (aged 92); Los Angeles, California, U.S.
- Occupation: Director
- Years active: 1951–1991

Charles Samuel Dubin (February 1, 1919 – September 5, 2011) was an American film and television director.

From the early 1950s to 1991, Dubin worked in television, directing episodes of Tales of Tomorrow, Omnibus, The Defenders, The Big Valley, The Virginian, Hawaii Five-O, M*A*S*H, Matlock, The Rockford Files, Kojak , Murder, She Wrote and other notable series. His other highest-profile work included the 1965 television version of Rodgers and Hammerstein's Cinderella, starring Lesley Ann Warren.

== Life and career ==
Dubin was born Charles Samuel Dubronevski in the New York City borough of Brooklyn, to a Russian Jewish family. He attended Samuel J. Tilden High School, and first became interested in the arts by wanting to pursue a career as an opera singer. After graduating from high school, he attended Brooklyn College, studying drama, and acted in a number of stage productions, before graduating in 1941. He then attended Neighborhood Playhouse in Manhattan studying stage managing and directing. He continued to act and sing in stage productions working as an understudy.

In 1950, he was hired by ABC, as an associate director and, within a few months, was soon promoted to head director, later going on to direct a number of notable series spanning 30 years. In 1958, Dubin was named in the Hollywood blacklist. He refused to testify and he was never cited for contempt, but was fired by NBC.

He directed more episodes of the highly popular 1970s television comedy M*A*S*H than anyone else.

Dubin retired in 1991 at the age of 70, after 39 years in television and 48 years in entertainment. His last television directing credit was the series Father Dowling Mysteries starring Tom Bosley.

== Marriage ==
He was married to Daphne Elliott, herself an early television director for The Big Story, with whom he had two children. They divorced in 1975. Later he married author and filmmaker Mary Lou Chayes.

== Death ==
On September 5, 2011, Dubin died of natural causes, aged 92.
