= Russ Mayberry =

American film director

- Born: Russell Bradley Mayberry; December 22, 1925; Duluth, Minnesota, U.S.
- Died: July 27, 2012 (aged 86); Fort Collins, Colorado, U.S.
- Education: Northwestern University
- Occupation: Television director
- Years active: 1947–1995
- Spouse: Sandy Mayberry (?–2012)
- Children: 2

Russell Bradley Mayberry (December 22, 1925 – July 27, 2012) was an American television director.

== Early life and career ==
Mayberry was born on December 22, 1925, in Duluth, Minnesota. He later moved to Chicago, Illinois, after serving as a Navy aviator during World War II. He was educated at Northwestern University.

Throughout a career that started in 1947, Mayberry amassed a number of credits in television. His credits include The Monkees, Bewitched, I Dream of Jeannie, That Girl, The Brady Bunch, The Partridge Family, The Andy Griffith Show, Alias Smith and Jones, McCloud, Marcus Welby, M.D., The Rockford Files, Kojak, The Fall Guy, Baa Baa Black Sheep, Miami Vice, Dallas, the Star Trek: The Next Generation episode Code of Honor, In the Heat of the Night, Matlock, The Rebels and other series.

== Later career ==
He directed Unidentified Flying Oddball (1979) starring Dennis Dugan for Walt Disney Productions. He also directed a number of television films, including The Million Dollar Dixie Deliverance and Sidney Shorr: A Girl's Best Friend.

His last directorial credit was an episode of the Prime Time Entertainment Network series Pointman in 1995.

== Personal life ==
Mayberry lived in Los Angeles, California, in Evergreen, Colorado, and in Fort Collins, Colorado. He died on July 27, 2012, at Fort Collins Medical Center. He is survived by his wife Sandy, his two children, and his grandson and granddaughter.
