= Nancy Stafford =

American actress, speaker, author

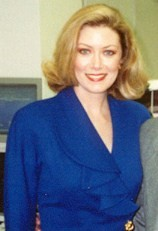
- Stafford in 1990
- Education: University of Florida (BA)
- Occupation: Actress
- Years active: 1977–present
- Known for: Matlock; St. Elsewhere; Miss Florida 1976
- Spouse: Larry Myers (m. 1989)
- Children: 1
- Website: www.nancystafford.com

Nancy Stafford is an American actress, speaker and author, known for her roles on television. She came to prominence in the 1980s as Michelle Thomas, law partner, on five seasons of Matlock. She later hosted a syndicated TV series called Main Floor (1994–2005), a show about fashion and beauty.

== Early life ==
Nancy Stafford graduated from the University of Florida. She was Miss Florida 1976, competing in the 1977 Miss America Pageant.

== Career ==
Stafford moved to Los Angeles in 1982, where she had her first contract role playing the dual role of Adrienne/Felicia Hunt on the daytime soap opera The Doctors. She had guest starring roles in shows such as Riptide, Remington Steele, Scarecrow and Mrs. King, Who's the Boss?, Hunter, Quantum Leap, and Magnum, P.I.. In 1983, Stafford won her first regular role on the NBC medical drama series St. Elsewhere as Joan Halloran. She played the role for two seasons and came back for one more episode in 1986. She later starred as Patricia Blake in the short-lived ABC series Sidekicks from 1986 to 1987.

Stafford is best known for her role as Ben Matlock's legal partner Michelle Thomas in the legal drama Matlock, from 1987 to 1992, after appearing as a guest in season 1. When the show relocated its filming from the west coast, Stafford opted to leave Matlock. After her departure from Matlock, she began public speaking and hosted Main Floor, a 1990s talk show.Stafford also made an appearance in Saved by the Bell:The College Years episode "The Poker Game".

In 2008, she co-hosted the first season of Love, Marriage and Stinkin' Thinkin alongside Mark Gungor. Stafford continued to guest star in many shows, such as ER, Frasier, Babylon 5, Baywatch and The Mentalist.

Stafford is the author of many Christian books, such as: Beauty by the Book: Seeing Yourself as God Sees You, The Wonder of His Love: A Journey into the Heart of God, and her 2006 book, Mothers & Daughters Taking Your Adult Relationship to a Deeper Level.

== Personal life ==
Stafford married Larry Myers, a pastor. She has a step-daughter and grandson. Her older brother, Tracy Stafford, was a two-term Mayor of Wilton Manors, Florida, and a five-term member of the Florida House of Representatives. She is a practicing Christian.

== Filmography ==
=== Film ===
| Year | Title | Role | Notes |
|---|---|---|---|
| 1982 | Q | Eyewitness | |
| 1987 | U.S. Marshals: Waco & Rhinehart | Joyce | Television film |
| 1993 | Moment of Truth: A Child Too Many | Sharon Davis | Television film |
| 1995 | Deadly Invasion: The Killer Bee Nightmare | Karen Ingram | Television film |
| 2002 | Destiny | Counselor | |
| 2004 | The Proverb | Lady in Park | Short film |
| 2007 | The Wager | Annie Steele | |
| 2011 | Christmas with a Capital C | Kristen Reed | |
| 2012 | Race to the Finish | Julie | |
| 2012 | Christmas Oranges | Mrs. Hartley | |
| 2013 | Foreclosed | Terri Boyd | Short film |
| 2013 | Superheroes Don't Need Capes | Jenny | |
| 2013 | Season of Miracles | Nurse Barbara | |
| 2013 | Assumed Killer | Dr. Weston | |
| 2013 | Christmas for a Dollar | Mrs. Rathbone | |
| 2014 | Heaven Help Us | Kat Banks | Short film |
| 2016 | Heritage Falls | Laura Fitzpatrick | |
| 2016 | I'm Not Ashamed | Mrs. Talbot | |
| 2017 | Heaven Bound | Josie | |
| 2017 | A Mermaid's Tale | Thaleia | |
| 2019 | Faith, Hope & Love | Mary Sue | |
| 2020 | First Lady | Kathryn Morales | |
| 2023 | Far Haven | Alma Watkins | |

=== Television ===
| Year | Title | Role | Notes |
|---|---|---|---|
| 1982 | The Doctors | Adrienne / Felicia Hunt | 1 episode |
| 1983 | Lone Star | Amanda Talbot | Television pilot |
| 1983–1986 | St. Elsewhere | Joan Halloran | Series regular, 30 episodes |
| 1984 | Who's the Boss? | Trish Baldwin | Episode: "Sorority Sister" |
| 1985 | Riptide | Lt. Peggy Burke | Episode: "Prisoner of War" |
| 1985 | Hunter | Nell Armstrong | Episode: "The Avenging Angel" |
| 1985 | Magnum, P.I. | Amy Griswald | Episode: "The Treasure of Kalaniopu'u" |
| 1985 | Scarecrow and Mrs. King | Colleen Donnelly | Episode: "Flight to Freedom" |
| 1985 | Remington Steele | Jennifer Davenport | Episode: "Stronger Than Steele" |
| 1986 | You Are the Jury | Diane Blake | Episode: "The State of Arizona vs. Dr. Evan Blake" |
| 1986 | D.C. Cops | Molly St. Clair | Television pilot |
| 1986–1987 | Sidekicks | Patricia Blake | Series regular, 23 episodes |
| 1986 | Matlock | Caryn Nelson / Caroline Nathan | Episode: "The Seduction" |
| 1987–1992 | Matlock | Michelle Thomas | Series regular, 109 episodes |
| 1990 | Quantum Leap | Peg Myers | Episode: "Miss Deep South - June 7, 1958" |
| 1993 | Saved by the Bell: The College Years | Judith Trudell | Episode: "The Poker Game" |
| 1996 | Frasier | Claire Barnes | Episode: "Moon Dance" |
| 1996 | Babylon 5 | Dr. Mary Kirkish | Episode: "Messages from Earth" |
| 1997 | Baywatch | Cassie Rose | Episode: "Rendezvous" |
| 2003 | Judging Amy | Judge Bell | Episodes: "Motion Sickness", "The Wrong Man" |
| 2008 | The Mentalist | Rosemary Tennant | Episode: "Seeing Red" |
| 2017–2018 | Scandal | BNC Anchor | 4 episodes |

Awards and achievements
| Preceded by Ann K. Schmalzried | Miss Florida; 1976 | Succeeded by Cathy La Belle |
