= Dean Hargrove =

American screenwriter (born 1938)

- Born: July 27, 1938 (age 88); Iola, Kansas, U.S.
- Education: Wichita State University; UCLA School of Theater, Film and Television
- Occupations: Television producer, writer, director
- Years active: 1960–present
- Notable work: Columbo, Matlock, Diagnosis: Murder, The Man from U.N.C.L.E.
- Spouse: Paula Vernay (m. 1962; div. 1978) Brenda Scott (m. 1979)
- Children: 1 stepchild
- Awards: Primetime Emmy Award for Columbo (1974)

Dean Hargrove (born July 27, 1938) is an American television producer, writer, and director. His background includes graduating from the St. John's Military School, Wichita State University, and attending the UCLA Film School as a graduate student. He specializes in creating mystery series. He frequently worked with television producer Fred Silverman and television writer Joel Steiger.

== Early career ==
Dean Hargrove was born on July 27, 1938, in Iola, Kansas. Early in his career, he received an Emmy nomination in his early twenties for his writing on the short-lived NBC series The Bob Newhart Show, starring Bob Newhart. This series is not to be confused with the more widely known CBS sitcom of the same name that aired from 1972 to 1978.

=== The Man from U.N.C.L.E. ===
Hargrove joined the writing staff of The Man from U.N.C.L.E. late in its first season (1964). His most substantial contributions came during the show's second season, where he wrote several episodes, including the two-part "The Alexander the Greater Affair", which was later edited into the theatrical release One Spy Too Many. He did not participate in the third season and contributed only one two-part episode during the series' brief fourth season.

=== Columbo and Matlock ===
Following his work on U.N.C.L.E., Hargrove joined Universal Television, where he wrote for several series including It Takes a Thief and The Name of the Game. He was also instrumental in the development of Columbo, scripting the second pilot episode, "Ransom for a Dead Man", and serving as producer during the show's second, third, and fourth seasons. While working at Universal, he launched an independent production company for theatrical films, Strathmore Productions, who produced The Manchu Eagle Murder Caper Mystery. In 1976, he left Universal Television to be hired by Viacom Productions through his company Strathmore Productions.

In later years, Hargrove worked with The Fred Silverman Company, Viacom Productions and Paramount Network Television, where he produced several long-running television series. These included the Perry Mason television movies on NBC from 1985 to 1995, Matlock, which aired on NBC and later ABC from 1986 to 1995, Jake and the Fatman (CBS, 1987–1992), and Diagnosis: Murder (CBS, 1993–2002).

== Personal life ==
Hargrove married Paula Vernay, an actress born in Iran who appeared in Son of Sinbad. The couple divorced after he had an affair with Brenda Scott, whom he would marry in 1979. He has one stepchild.

== Awards ==
Hargrove won a Primetime Emmy Award for Columbo in 1974 and was nominated on four other occasions.

== Filmography (selected television) ==
Year	Title	Creator	Producer	Writer	Network
1960–1972	My Three Sons	no	no	yes	ABC / CBS
1964–1968	The Man from U.N.C.L.E.	no	no	yes	NBC
1968–1971	The Name of the Game	no	yes	no	NBC
1970–1977	McCloud	no	yes	yes	NBC
1972–1975	Columbo	no	yes	yes	NBC
1979	Dear Detective	no	yes	yes	
1985–1995	Perry Mason television films	no	yes	yes	NBC
1986–1995	Matlock	yes	yes	yes	NBC / ABC
1987–1992	Jake and the Fatman	yes	yes	yes	CBS
1989–1991	Father Dowling Mysteries	yes	yes	yes	NBC / ABC
1993–2001	Diagnosis: Murder	no	yes	no	CBS
2002	Diagnosis: Murder	no	yes	no	CBS
2005	McBride	yes	yes	no	Hallmark Channel
2005	Jane Doe	yes	yes	yes	Hallmark Channel
2006–2008	Murder 101	yes	yes	no	Hallmark Channel
