= Robert Scheerer =

American actor, director, and producer

- Born: December 28, 1929; Santa Barbara, California, U.S.
- Died: March 3, 2018 (aged 88); Valley Village, Los Angeles, California, U.S.
- Occupations: Actor; film and television director; producer

Robert Scheerer (December 28, 1929 – March 3, 2018) was an American film and television director, actor, and producer.

Scheerer was born in Santa Barbara, California, on December 28, 1929.

Scheerer's work in films began with his dancing, including Mister Big (1943) and other films with the tap group The Jivin' Jacks and Jills. He also performed on television programs, including Dagmar's Canteen, Cavalcade of Stars, and Four Star Revue. He made his Broadway debut in the musical Lend an Ear in 1948, appearing with Carol Channing and Gene Nelson, and won a Theatre World Award for Outstanding Debut. He continued on Broadway in Dance Me a Song (1950), Top Banana (1951) and The Boy Friend (1954). He also was assistant to the choreographer for Tickets, Please! (1950).

After the 1950s Scheerer concentrated on directing, receiving an Emmy Award for Best Director in 1964 for The Danny Kaye Show. He received three Emmy Award nominations for directing Fame. Scheerer went on to direct multiple episodes of Star Trek: The Next Generation, Star Trek: Deep Space Nine and Star Trek: Voyager.

Scheerer died in Valley Village, California, on March 3, 2018.

== Filmography ==
=== Film ===
- Adam at 6 A.M. (1970)
- The World's Greatest Athlete (1973)
- How to Beat the High Cost of Living (1980)

=== Television (selection) ===
- Arsenic and Old Lace (1969)
- Poor Devil (1973)
- It Happened at Lakewood Manor (1977)
- Star Trek: The Next Generation (11 episodes)
  - "The Measure of a Man" (1989)
  - "Peak Performance" (1989)
  - "The Price" (1989)
  - "The Defector" (1990)
  - "Tin Man" (1990)
  - "Legacy" (1990)
  - "New Ground" (1992)
  - "The Outcast" (1992)
  - "True Q" (1992)
  - "Chain of Command", Part I (1992)
  - "Inheritance" (1993)
- Star Trek: Deep Space Nine: "Shadowplay" (1994)
- Star Trek: Voyager: "Rise" (1997), "State of Flux" (1995)

In a 1992 interview, Scheerer said "I love to work with a script and an actor" and "On The Next Generation, the actors work hard, try things and are pleasant. The crew is hard-working and fun; we have a lot of laughs and they can really get down to work when they need to. That's what makes it a pleasure to do."
