= List of Matlock characters =

These are the characters of the 1986 American television legal drama Matlock.

== Main ==
| Character | Portrayer | Position | Seasons | | | | | | | | | |
| Character | Portrayer | Position | Pilot | 1 | 2 | 3 | 4 | 5 | 6 | 7 | 8 | 9 |
|---|---|---|---|---|---|---|---|---|---|---|---|---|
| Ben Matlock | Andy Griffith | Lawyer | Main | Main | Main | Main | Main | Main | Main | Main | Main | Main |
| Charlene Matlock | Lori Lethin | Lawyer | Main | | | | | | | | | |
| Charlene Matlock | Linda Purl | Lawyer | | Main | | | | | | | | |
| Hazel | Alice Hirson | Secretary | Main | | | | | | | | | |
| Tyler Hudson | Kene Holliday | Private investigator | Main | Main | Main | Main | Guest | Cameo | | | | |
| Michelle Thomas | Nancy Stafford | Lawyer | | | Main | Main | Main | Main | Main | Cameo | Cameo | |
| Cassie Phillips | Kari Lizer | Assistant | | | Main | | | | | | | |
| Julie March | Julie Sommars | Prosecutor | | Recurring | Recurring | Main | Main | Main | Main | Cameo | Cameo | Guest |
| Conrad McMasters | Clarence Gilyard Jr. | Private investigator | | | | | Main | Main | Main | Main | Main | |
| Leanne MacIntyre | Brynn Thayer | Lawyer | | | | | | | Guest | Main | Main | |
| Cliff Lewis | Daniel Roebuck | Lawyer | | | | | | | | Main | Main | Main |
| Jerri Stone | Carol Huston | Private Investigator | | | | | | | | | | Main |

=== Ben Matlock ===
Benjamin Leighton "Ben" Matlock is a renowned, folksy yet cantankerous defense attorney who charges a fee of $100,000 to take a case. He is known for visiting crime scenes to discover overlooked clues, as well as his down-home style of coming up with viable, alternative theories of the crime in question (usually murder) while sitting in his office playing the banjo or polishing his shoes. Matlock also has conspicuously finicky fashion sense (wearing nothing but grey suits) and an insatiable appetite for hot dogs (an explanation for this is featured in the Diagnosis: Murder cross-over double episode "Murder Two", which also marked the last appearance of Matlock on television). Despite his high fees and apparent wealth, he is something of a cheapskate. He's the show's main protagonist. Andy Griffith appeared in every episode of the series.

=== Charlene Matlock ===
Charlene is Ben's daughter and is also a lawyer. She assists her father at his law practice in Atlanta for a short time, appearing only in the first season of the series. Purl replaced Lori Lethin who appeared as Charlene in the pilot "Diary of a Perfect Murder". It's explained later in Season 1 that Charlene moved to Philadelphia and started her own firm there.

=== Leanne MacIntyre ===
MacIntyre is Matlock's daughter. After divorcing her husband, of whom her father did not much approve, she moves back to Atlanta to help him with his legal practice. She assists her father for three years before leaving for her own practice. During that time, she works with her father on numerous cases, including defending him on one occasion. They once found themselves on opposite sides of a divorce case, though she also defends her father in a personal injury case simultaneously during the same episode. Leanne uses the same courtroom techniques her father at times, which often results in her clients being proven innocent. In the Season 9 episode, The Accused, it's implied that Leanne may now be living in Los Angeles. She left the show in 1994.

=== Julie March ===
March is the assistant D.A. of Atlanta, a good friend, and probable lover of Ben Matlock. After a chance meeting with Ben Matlock in an elevator, the two hit it off, and Matlock is surprised to learn that she will be the prosecutor for the case he is working on. The two lawyers soon become friends and though their relationship is never defined formally, there were ongoing indicators that it was romantic. She regularly made him fried chicken - one of his favorite meals. In one episode Julie stays with Ben in his home while hers was being renovated. The arrangement becomes conflictual due to a case but in the end they celebrate at Ben's house with champagne and candles lit around his living room. In another episode, he and Julie talk about a time he took her to dinner for her birthday and they held hands during that event. Season 6 Episode 2 " The Witness Killings" Ben takes Julie to his hometown for the town's bicentennial festivities. They stay with Ben's aunt Elsie who instantly recognizes the romantic connection and notes their politeness for sleeping in separate rooms, encouraging them to just use one. Elsie asks intrusive questions to Julie about marriage and children which makes Julie uncomfortable. The townsfolk are so enamored by and intrusive of Ben's fame and money, the awkwardness surrounding Ben and Julie disclosing the breadth of their relationship is compounded and they subsequently introduce each other as work colleagues. At that point Ben proclaims to his former town girlfriend that Julie "doesnt belong to me." In Julie's return in the season nine episode "The Confession", she reveals that she has feelings for him. She left in 1992.

=== Michelle Thomas ===
Thomas is an attorney working with Ben Matlock. Ben meets Michelle in England, where Michelle is working as legal counsel for a wealthy Brit. She decides to move back to the US when Ben asks her to join him at his firm. She is an intelligent, highly capable lawyer who often works with Ben on his cases, and who occasionally acts as the primary attorney. She is soft-spoken and beautiful, sometimes using her charm and good looks to convince witnesses and suspects to give her the information she needs to crack a case. Her sharp intelligence is best illustrated in an episode called "The Game Show"; she goes undercover as a contestant to investigate a murder, and reveals to Ben and Conrad that she is a polymath, being able to answer nearly every question correctly.

=== Cassie Phillips ===
Cassie worked as a typist and secretary for Ben, usually typing legal documents and sending them to the courthouse. She involved herself in some cases and was very persistent in her first episode ("The Therapist") when she came to Ben looking for a job, one that he said didn't exist. In "The Lovelorn", Cassie mentioned she has a boyfriend Brad. They didn't speak for some time because of misunderstandings they both had with each other. Ben helped them to reconcile. Later, Cassie told Ben she accepted Brad's offer to accompany him on his business trip. Cassie was last seen on the episode "The Genius" featuring Ben's nephew Irwin, on whom she had a crush. She left in 1988, without any explanation, but it presumes that she left with Brad.

=== Jerri Stone ===
Geraldine Margaret "Jerri" Stone is an assistant who works for Ben Matlock in the final season. She has a forthright style, once even jabbing her foot into that of a man who was looking through some files while investigating a murder. She also enjoys singing old songs with Ben on occasion. She drives a blue Ford SUV.

=== Tyler Hudson ===
Hudson is a private investigator for Ben Matlock. Before working for Matlock, Tyler was a lieutenant in the U.S. Army. He is interested in cooking and investing in venture capital projects on the side, such as in pecans. In the episode "The Chef", he says that he entered the Junior Chamber of Commerce Chili Cook-Off, which he wins $2,000 for his chili. It is a Victoria Edwards recipe: chili with chicken, peanut butter sauce, and a few secret ingredients. Tyler rarely misses Victoria Edward's TV cooking show. In early 1989, in the middle of the third season, Holliday had to take time off of work, due to him going to rehab for his drug/alcohol dependency, where he attended on an outpatient basis, and by the time he was 3 months sober, he was already fired.

=== Conrad McMasters ===
McMasters is a private investigator for Ben Matlock. Before working for him, Conrad worked for Dalton Parks as a deputy sheriff in Manteo, where Matlock meets him in hopes of figuring out whether or not Spencer Hamilton killed his brother's killer. In his spare time, he does singing, rodeo riding, cooking, and playing the guitar. In almost the same situation as his partner, Michelle Thomas, he was shot and nearly killed in the episode "The Outcast", but survived.

He either works with or has dates with several women:

In "The Star", while getting goosebumps, Conrad hid himself at the front door and accidentally scared Catherine's daughter, Susan McKay. She was sent to Matlock, about the afternoon her mother was murdered for real, and said she was doing research for her book about her mother, being the vain, cruel parent that she was; the culprit turned out to be Jack Burns, who represented Catherine's career.

In "The Informer", Conrad works with Ben's client's partner/investigator, Angela Page, to work on a case on the night one of David's clients, Sam Chandler, was murdered. After Matlock's client abruptly fires Angela, she turns to Conrad; the real culprit behind Sam's murder turned out to be Al Brackman.

In "The Secret", when Matlock sends him to Chicago to talk to Sherry Brown in questioning her about the negatives he is supposed to find, he receives word that she died from jumping off the apartment building.

In "The Cover Girl", he had a short fling with Carla Royce, a model. When Carla's boss and head of a modeling agency, Jackie Whitman, is murdered, Conrad asked Carla if Jackie and Bobby Michaelson (Paul Lieber), who had informed Conrad he owned part of a modeling agency in New York, got along with each other, Carla replied that Jackie and Bobby "fought like cats and dogs". Carla then explained it was not easy being Jackie's partner, much less one of her models; when Conrad wondered why, Carla explained that Jackie was a control freak and always had to have the last word in everything, which Carla referred to as "infuriating". When Conrad asked her why she went along with Jackie's advice, Carla explained that nine out of ten times, Jackie was right. However, Conrad breaks up with her before she is found guilty of Jackie's murder.

In "The Game Show", while looking at the credits for the game show It's About Time, he asked his friend Marjorie Wood, a contestant coordinator, to give Conrad many tickets for the show, along with Matlock, who would meet hostess Kari Summers for the show. He asked Michelle Thomas to become a contestant; she refused, but literally changed her mind when she met the eligibility requirements. Producer Larry Fisher was, at one point, going to replace the old host, Dennis Blake, with a much younger host (as his show was dropping in the ratings). Kari was arguing with Larry; before Dennis showed up his career would have been over. For every show, Kari attached the tiny device to the lighting board, and the lights would go out prior to the taping of the show, and nobody would see anything. Kari was found guilty for killing Larry (after taking a break), while Dennis was found innocent.

In "Mr. Awesome", when waitress and mother Anne Johnson was accused of murdering her ex-boyfriend, Dwayne Meeks, Conrad sought Matlock out to represent Anne. Matlock and Conrad both found out that Dwayne was a liar, a jerk and a cheater towards the many women who were afraid of him. Her son Jimmy draws the pictures of people to model on his own so much and was so good at it, because he had nothing else to do. Anne was found innocent of her ex-boyfriend's murder, and the culprit was Lorraine Ortega (aka Sissy Lockwood), a bartender, who was also a fugitive from Texas; she gave Dwayne all that money, and later used the stun gun to kill him when she entered the apartment on the same day.

Clarence Gilyard, Jr., appeared in nearly every episode of the show, for his three seasons, until he reduced his role for his fourth season in 1992. He left the show in 1993 to star in Walker, Texas Ranger, where he stayed on the show for eight seasons.

=== Cliff Lewis ===
Lewis is an attorney, but is described as Ben Matlock's friend in the season-eight episode, "The Godfather". He lies once to the people from Mt. Harlan, saying that he is a full partner with Ben, but he later confesses that Ben Matlock does not have any partners. Cliff is the son of Billy Lewis, Matlock's high-school girlfriend's brother, whom he had known back in Mt. Harlan.

== Recurring ==
- Charlie Matlock (Andy Griffith), father of Ben Matlock, is a gas station owner; his only appearances are set in flashbacks before the series timeline began. (appears in the episodes: "The Dame", season 6; "The Legacy", parts 1 and 2, season 7; and "The Diner", season 8)
- Young Ben Matlock (Steve Witting) in episodes "The Dame" and "The Diner"
- Lt. Bob Brooks (David Froman; 58 episodes), Atlanta PD detective and friend of Ben Matlock's (seasons 1-6 and one appearance in season 9, where he was murdered)
- Lloyd Burgess (Michael Durrell; 54 episodes), district attorney, seasons 1-6
- Richard "Richie" Cooksey (Richard Newton; 24 episodes), judge seasons 1-6
- Judge Clagett (Al Wiggins; 17 episodes), judge in seasons 7-9
- Les Calhoun (Don Knotts; 16 episodes), Matlock's neighbor in seasons 3-6
- Billy Lewis (Warren Frost; 16 episodes), friend/nemesis of Ben Matlock and brother of his old high-school girlfriend; the father of Cliff Lewis seasons 6-9
- Irene Sawyer (Lucille Meredith; 15 episodes), judge seasons 1-6
- Arthur Beaumont (Jason Wingreen; 13 episodes), judge seasons 1-6
- Lt. Harmen Andrews (Jordan Rhoades), friend of Ben Matlock; works in the Atlanta PD season 8
- Lt. Frank Daniels (James McEachin; 8 episodes), friend of Matlock; works in the Atlanta PD season 1
- Cynthia Justin (Aneta Corsaut; 7 episodes; played Helen Crump on The Andy Griffith show), judge
- Ed Wingate (J. Kenneth Campbell; 3 episodes), FBI agent
- Sarah (Betty Lynn; 4 episodes; played Thelma Lou on The Andy Griffith Show) (Matlock's secretary in 4 episodes of season one)
- Ms. Hawkins (Diane Shalet) (Matlock's housekeeper season 5)
- Mrs. McCardle (Marge Redmond) (Matlock's housekeeper season 5)
- Billy Wheeler (Randy Travis; 2 episodes), in "The Big Payoff" (1992), he is a guitar-playing wanderer who travels around doing odd jobs. Matlock hires him to paint his house but then encourages him to try music after hearing him play. In "The Mark" (1993), he is now an aspiring country singer who wins the lottery, and shortly thereafter finds himself framed for the murder of contractor Judy Wilson, who was really a con artist and had taken him and every other partner for a ride.

== Notable one-time characters ==
- Carter Addison (Dick Van Dyke), in "The Judge" (1.2), a judge who murders his lover and then presides over the murder trial in which Ben is trying to clear someone else's name for.
- Laura Miller (Laura Robbins), who appeared in "The Godfather" (8.19), is the goddaughter of Ben Matlock. The last time she saw her godfather was 11 years before her wedding, when he was at her mother's funeral. She no longer lived in Mt. Harlan at this point; instead, she was working in an Atlanta-area mall in a clothing store as an assistant manager in Marietta.
- David Sears (silent film actor Eddie Quillan) made his last acting appearance in the season one episode "The Author".
- Hazel (Alice Hirson) appeared in the pilot Diary of a Perfect Murder. Hazel is Matlock's secretary.
- Diana Huntington (Christina Pickles) in the "Picture" (6.12-13) is Matlock's annoying cousin.
- Harvey Chase (Milton Berle) is the favourite comedian of Matlock who Matlock defends when he is accused of murdering a younger rival.

== See also ==
- List of Matlock episodes
