= Ben Matlock =

Fictional lawyer

- Matlock character
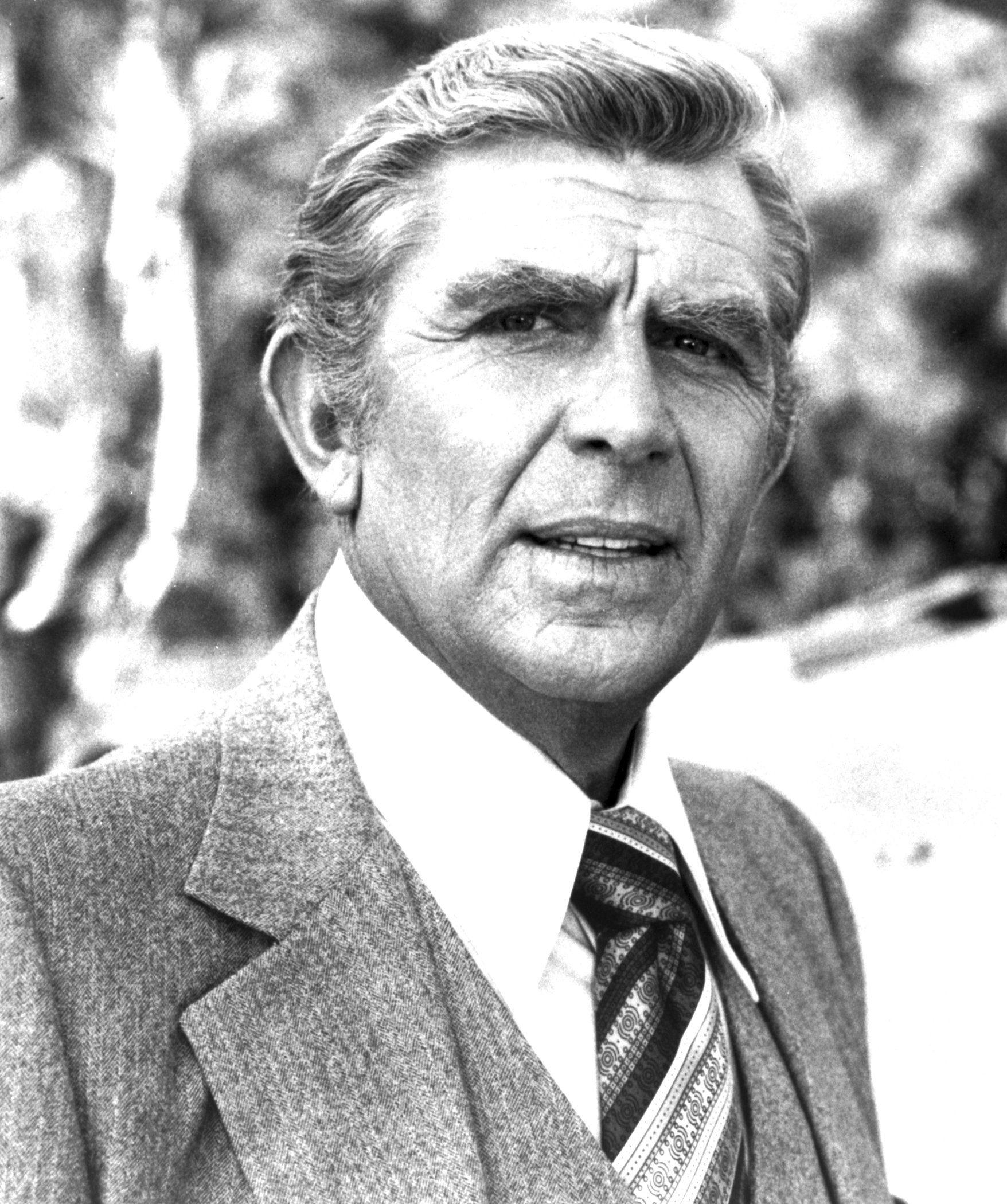
- Andy Griffith portraying Ben Matlock
- Portrayed by: Andy Griffith; Steve Witting (young)
- First appearance: Diary of a Perfect Murder (1986); Matlock
- Last appearance: "Murder Two: Part 2" (1997); Diagnosis: Murder
- Created by: Dean Hargrove
In-universe information
- Occupation: Defense attorney
- Father: Charlie Matlock
- Spouse: (deceased)
- Children: Charlene Matlock; Leanne MacIntyre
- Other relatives: Laura Miller (goddaughter)

Benjamin Leighton Matlock is a fictional character from the television series, Matlock, played by Andy Griffith. Matlock is a renowned, folksy yet cantankerous defense attorney who is worth every penny of his $100,000 fee. Known for visiting the scene of the crime to discover clues otherwise overlooked and his down-home style of coming up with viable, alternative theories of the crime in question (usually murder) while sitting in his office playing the banjo ukulele or polishing his shoes. Matlock also had conspicuously finicky fashion sense, and an insatiable appetite for hot dogs. Despite his high fees and apparent wealth, he is something of a cheapskate. Andy Griffith initially did not like the character due to his vanity and cheapness. Matlock is reported to be based on Georgia defense attorney Bobby Lee Cook. Steve Witting played a young Matlock in two episodes, with Griffith playing his father.

== Early life ==
In high school, Ben played baseball, and hit a home run in the 9th inning (The Umpire). Ben worked for nine years prior to attending Harvard Law School, and accordingly was significantly older than his law school classmates. As such, Ben was not treated exceptionally well by his classmates, and one classmate purposely kept him out of Harvard's Law Review. (The Reunion) He ultimately graduated from Harvard Law in 1957. (The Reunion)

While attending Harvard Law School, Ben tried to quit law school. His professor, Erskine Tate, threatened to beat him up. Later Ben recalled that Tate was his favorite professor and that he owed the professor a lot. (The Professor)

Ben Matlock's first big case was defending a black cook, Cyrus Jordan (portrayed by Stan Shaw) in 1962, who was accused of murdering the sheriff in Mt. Harlan. Ben had become dissatisfied with being a D.A., and wanted to defend people, and decided to take Cyrus' case.

== Family ==
Ben Matlock is a widower who had two daughters, Charlene and Leanne, who both became lawyers in their own right and who both worked alongside their father at one point or another. His father, Charlie Matlock, was an auto repairman in Ben's hometown.

He also had a goddaughter, Laura Miller (portrayed by Laura Robbins), whom he had not seen for the last 11 years since her mother's funeral. She worked at a clothing store at an Atlanta mall (The Godfather).

Ben also has a nephew Erwin Bruckner, who, in the episode The Genius, was accused of murdering his boss.

== Legal practice ==
Ben Matlock had been in practice since the early 1960s, has represented over 400 criminal cases (Diary of a Perfect Murder), and chose his cases based on the belief that his client was innocent. His retainer is $100,000.

Ben Matlock had several assistants over the years, both as lawyers and private investigators. His lawyer assistants were his daughters Charlene Matlock and Leanne MacIntyre as well as Michelle Thomas and Cliff Lewis. His private investigators were Tyler Hudson, Conrad McMasters, Cliff Lewis, and Jerri Stone. His associates often walked into his house without knocking, eating with Ben, and having barbecue with him (The Confession).

At times, Matlock has taken divorce and custody cases. One such case, concerning Carla Evans and her husband, was an unusual case for Matlock because he lost. Five years afterward, Carla was charged with murdering her ex-husband, and Matlock took the case pro bono as a way of apologizing to Carla (The Stripper). Losing a case was a rarity for Matlock, but he has had the occasion to correct that, as with Lester Matthews (The Convict), when Lester was tried for murdering a fellow inmate. Another one he lost was when Ken Wilson was arrested for killing his wife (The Black Widow). It took Matlock's client seven years for him to get out of custody. After his release, he was accused a second time, hence, his lawyer traveled to Los Angeles to reopen the case, a second time. He was found innocent. The third case he lost was to Dave Travis (The Pro), who was then convicted for killing Victor Tomasio. There was also (The Brothers) where Matlock lost the case when he got the other brother to admit to being involved in the murder and subsequently telling where the defendant was and his involvement. Matlock won in that he caught the killers but albeit in a different way that wouldn't break client-lawyer privilege as well as living up the agreement he'd made earlier to his client to defend him.

A case he had won where Drew Carey (The Fugitive), was found innocent for not killing Uncle Edwin. Although he did not do it, the judge recommended Drew perform an indefinite community service, despite his volatile behavior, inside and outside of court.

TV Actor Andy Griffith portrayed Ben Matlock for the duration of the Matlock television series. He also portrayed Charles Matlock, Ben's father, in flashbacks.

== Songs Ben Matlock sings in Matlock ==
- My Buddy by Anne Murray in (The Starlet), accompanied on banjo.
- Yes Sir, That's My Baby by Bing Crosby.
- Going Down the Road Feeling Bad with Randy Travis.

Throughout the series, Ben Matlock is shown to be talented in playing the Country guitar, ukulele, steel guitar, and banjo.

== See also ==
- List of characters in Matlock
