= Anne Collins (author) =

Canadian writer, editor and publishing executive

Anne Collins (born 1952) is a Canadian writer, editor and publishing executive who won the Governor General's Award for English-language non-fiction in 1988.

Born in Whitby, Ontario, Collins earned a Bachelor of Arts from York University and has held a wide range of writing, and editorial jobs in the Canadian publishing and magazine industry. The publisher at Knopf Random Canada Publishing Group and vice-president of Random House of Canada, Collins has also written the award-winning In the Sleep Room: The Story of The CIA Brainwashing Experiments in Canada. In the Sleep Room explored the history of Dr. Ewen Cameron and Montreal's Allan Memorial Institute and was made into a movie directed by Anne Wheeler in 1998.

== Works ==
- The big evasion: abortion, the issue that won't go away (1985)
- In the Sleep Room: the story of the CIA brainwashing experiments in Canada (1988)

== See also ==
- David Orlikow
- MKULTRA
