= Joel Steiger =

American television producer (1942–2021)

Joel Steiger (March 11, 1942 – March 21, 2021) was an American television producer, writer, and director. He specialized in creating mystery series and has worked as writer, executive producer, and consultant on some of the most successful television mysteries of the 80's & 90's.

== Awards ==
Steiger has won one Edgar Award in 1983 for "Remington Steele" for episode "In the Steele Of The Night".

== Filmography (selected television) ==
=== Producer or executive producer ===
- Diagnosis Murder (executive producer) (2 episodes, 1997)
- Gramps (1995) (TV) (executive producer)
- Matlock (executive producer) (89 episodes, 1990-1995) (supervising producer) (45 episodes, 1987-1990) (producer) (24 episodes, 1986-1987) (co-executive producer) (21 episodes, 1989-1990)
- Jake and the Fatman (executive producer) 44 episodes
- Perry Mason (co-executive Producer) 26 2hr movies

=== Writer ===
- A Town Without Pity (2002) (TV) (writer)
- Diagnosis Murder (9 episodes, 1997-2001)
- Thrill (1996) (TV) (television story)
- Matlock (54 episodes, 1986-1995)
- Perry Mason: The Case of the Telltale Talk Show Host (1993) (TV) (story)
- Father Dowling Mysteries (41 episodes, 1989-1991)
- Jake and the Fatman (1987) TV series (unknown episodes)
