= List of seaQuest DSV episodes =

This is the complete list of seaQuest DSV episodes. In all, there are 57 episodes, with two of them originally being two-hour television movies. If the two two-hour episodes ("To Be or Not to Be" and "Daggers") are counted as four one-hour episodes then the total number of episodes would be 59. The series was titled "seaQuest DSV" for its first two seasons and renamed "seaQuest 2032" for the third season.

seaQuest DSV first aired on September 12, 1993 with "To Be or Not to Be" and concluded on June 9, 1996 with "Weapons of War".

== Series overview ==
Season	Episodes	Originally released	
Season	Episodes	First released	Last released
1	23	September 12, 1993	May 22, 1994
2	21	September 18, 1994	September 13, 1995
3	13	September 20, 1995	June 9, 1996

=== Summary of series ===
In "the near future" (beginning in the year 2018), the series follows the adventures of the high-tech submarine seaQuest DSV 4600. Funded by the United States government and other private loans, the seaQuest was the largest submarine to ever travel the seas. Designed by navy captain Nathan Bridger, the seaQuest was originally designed as a military vessel. However, following the death of his son Robert during a global war in the early 21st century, Bridger retires from the service and retreats to an island somewhere in the Yucatán Peninsula. Devoting the majority of his time to science, Bridger rescued a dolphin, whom he named Darwin, from a fisherman's net in a lagoon. He attempted to develop a form of verbal communication between Humans and dolphins, but eventually tried to develop a series of hand signals. During his self-imposed exile on the island, Bridger's wife, Carol, also dies, leaving him totally alone. Following the "Livingston Trench Incident" in which the world was almost plunged into a nuclear war, the seaQuest was left without a captain. The ship was recalled to drydock and refitted to become less of a military force and more of an exploration and research vessel. Realizing that the ship needed a captain that had not been "sitting with his finger on the trigger", the new United Earth Oceans Organization (or UEO) recruits Bridger to assume command of the boat he designed.

=== Airdate discrepancies ===
When seaQuest DSV originally aired on NBC, the network occasionally aired the episodes out of order from when they were produced. This resulted in a number of continuity errors between episodes. For example, in the first season, Captain Bridger's uniform originally lacked any collar insignia. It was later added after a few episodes had been completed, but, because the episodes aired out of order, the insignia appears then disappears from episode to episode (if viewing by airdate order). Later in the season, Admiral Noyce is seen as the Secretary General of the UEO in "The Stinger" and "Hide and Seek", a position he obtains in "The Last Lap at Luxury" which originally aired afterwards. In the second season, Bridger's beard is gone in "Dream Weaver", but reappears in "Watergate", only to disappear again throughout the rest of the season. Additionally, the episode "Blindsided" (which finally aired in September 1995 shortly before the third season was to begin airing) shows the seaQuest still on Earth, even though it had been taken to the planet Hyperion and destroyed in the season finale "Splashdown". In the third season, the episode "Brainlock" shows Lieutenant Brody still alive, even though he died in "SpinDrift".

For the purposes of this article, the episodes are listed by episode number.

== Episodes ==
=== Season 1 (1993–94) ===
No. overall	No. in season	Title	Directed by	Written by	Original release date	Prod. code
1	1	"To Be or Not to Be" "The Nathan Bridger Incident"	Irvin Kershner	Teleplay by : Rockne S. O'Bannon & Tommy Thompson; Story by : Rockne S. O'Bannon	September 12, 1993	68901
When Commander Jonathan Ford is forced to relieve Captain Marilyn Stark of duty for disobeying orders, the seaQuest DSV is left without a captain. The new United Earth Oceans Organization recruits reluctant retired Captain Nathan Bridger to assume command; however, Bridger is not at all enthusiastic about rejoining the military. But, when a renegade pirate submarine begins to endanger lives, Bridger can't help but be swept up in the life he tried to escape, especially when the captain of the rebel sub turns out to be the recently fired Stark on a revenge mission to destroy the seaQuest. Special guest star: Shelley Hack Note: Originally shown as a feature length TV pilot movie, which was later cut into two separate episodes for syndication.
2	2	"The Devil's Window"	Les Landau	David J. Burke & Hans Tobeason	September 19, 1993	68916
While investigating a black smoker, Darwin becomes seriously ill. Bridger must contemplate setting his long-time aquatic pal free in order to save his life.
3	3	"Treasures of the Mind"	Bryan Spicer	David Kemper	September 26, 1993	68918
The seaQuest discovers the lost Library of Alexandria sunken beneath the sea. However, when surrounding nations cannot agree on a peaceful way to share the discovery, Bridger must act as mediator before escalating tensions result in the destruction of the library.
4	4	"Games"	Joe Napolitano	David Venable	October 3, 1993	68904
Mass murderer Dr. Rubin Zellar (Alan Scarfe) is unwittingly taken aboard the seaQuest. Placing him in custody, Zellar is able to escape and informs Bridger that he's hidden a toxin frozen in ice somewhere aboard the ship... a toxin that is surely melting with each passing second.
5	5	"Treasures of the Tonga Trench"	Les Sheldon	John J. Sakmar & Kerry Lenhart	October 9, 1993	68917
As the seaQuest undergoes inspection, Lieutenant Benjamin Krieg has a close encounter with an unknown life form while in a seaCrab in the Tonga Trench. When the creature lets him go, Krieg discovers a treasure trove of mysterious glowing stones; stones that may mean big money. However, is the bigger threat to seaQuest the greed that overtakes the crew or the unknown life form?
6	6	"Brothers and Sisters"	Bill L. Norton	Art Monterastelli	October 17, 1993	68906
The seaQuest is ordered to entomb a munitions depot thought to be abandoned. However, when the crew discovers children living inside, Bridger must convince them to follow him to safety. Special guest star: Kellie Martin
7	7	"Give Me Liberte"	Bill L. Norton	John J. Sakmar & Kerry Lenhart	October 24, 1993	68903
A virus found on board a sunken space station infects the crew. As Bridger rushes to find the inventor of the pathogen, a warrior submarine from an opposing confederation arrives to cover up their crimes, even if it means the destruction of the seaQuest. Special guest star: Udo Kier
8	8	"Knight of Shadows"	Helaine Head	Melinda M. Snodgrass	October 31, 1993	68924
When Bridger is hurled across his quarters by an unknown force, it leads the seaQuest to find a hundred-year-old sunken ship where the spirits of those who perished there haunt its ancient hull, one of which possesses Dr. Westphalen.
9	9	"Bad Water"	Bryan Spicer	David Kemper	November 7, 1993	68921
Commander Ford, Dr. Westphalen, Lucas and Lieutenant Krieg are trapped on the surface of the ocean as a hurricane rages above them. Meanwhile, suffering severe damage from a lightning strike, the seaQuest must desperately search for a sunken French submarine before its passengers, all children, run out of air.
10	10	"The Regulator"	Les Sheldon	David J. Burke	November 21, 1993	68925
When the air conditioning breaks down in the crew quarters, Krieg has no choice but to turn to "The Regulator", a cut-throat black market trader who hides a shamed past with whom Bridger is familiar with and whom Lucas finds he can sympathize with.
11	11	"seaWest"	Gabrielle Beaumont	John J. Sakmar & Kerry Lenhart	November 28, 1993	68920
When the seaQuest visits the Broken Ridge mining colony, one of the colonists desperately pleads for the crew's help to escape from a dangerous situation straight out of the Old West. Special guest stars: David McCallum as Frank Cobb, David Morse as Lenny Sutter
12	12	"Photon Bullet"	Steve Dubin	Michael Cassutt	December 19, 1993	68923
Feeling isolated, unwanted, and unappreciated aboard the seaQuest, Lucas visits Node Three, a communications colony populated by other teenage computer geniuses, led by legendary computer hacker Martin Clemens, aka. "Mycroft". However, Lucas soon finds himself caught up in the group's tampering with global finances – tamperings that have more motive than they appear. Special guest stars: Tim Russ, Seth Green
13	13	"Better Than Martians"	John T. Kretchmer	David Kemper & Dan Brecher	January 2, 1994	68926
The first crewed mission to Mars returns home to Earth, led by Commander Scott Keller, an old friend of Bridger. However, a malfunction during re-entry plunges the capsule into the ocean where a corrupt general from a foreign confederation races to recover the astronauts before the seaQuest can.
14	14	"Nothing but the Truth"	Les Sheldon	David Kemper	January 9, 1994	68913
In preparation for an experiment, the crew evacuates the seaQuest, leaving only Commander Ford, Lt. Commander Hitchcock, Lieutenant Krieg, Chief Crocker, and Lucas aboard. However, environmental extremists use the seaQuest's vulnerable state to seize control of the boat.
15	15	"Greed for a Pirate's Dream"	James A. Contner	David J. Burke & Robert Engels	January 16, 1994	68927
When Dr. Raleigh Young's magma buoy launched from the seaQuest months earlier rockets out of the sea and crash lands onto an island, a group of treasure hunters believe that the UEO is on their way to steal the fortune they hope to find.
16	16	"Whale Song"	Bryan Spicer	Patrick Hasburgh	February 6, 1994	68932
When an environmental radical begins to sink whaling ships, the UEO orders Bridger to find the attacker and destroy him. However, Bridger refuses on moral grounds and resigns as captain of the seaQuest.
17	17	"The Stinger"	Jonathan Sanger	Teleplay by : John J. Sakmar and David J. Burke & Patrick Hasburgh; Story by : John J. Sakmar & Kerry Lenhart	February 20, 1994	68928
Lucas and Lt. Commander Hitchcock enter the seaQuest in a competition to design a revolutionary new kind of single-seat submersible. However, while testing it, Lucas is fired upon and the sub is captured by a rival developer.
18	18	"Hide and Seek"	Lindsley Parsons III	Robert Engels	February 27, 1994	68933
While visiting Dr. Westphalen is visiting Malcolm Lansdowne, the two of them are captured by ousted dictator and escaped UEO prisoner Milos Tezlov, who wants Malcolm's dolphins to train for militaristic purposes. However, when Kristin notices Tezlov's autistic son Caesar taking an extreme liking to dolphins, she forges a deal for her release, granting Tezlov passage aboard the seaQuest. Special guest star: William Shatner
19	19	"The Last Lap at Luxury"	Bryan Spicer	Zora Quayton	March 20, 1994	68905
UEO Secretary General Andrea Dre travels aboard the seaQuest en route to a conference where she invites Lucas to join her to speak out on his work with Darwin. However, Lucas soon finds himself held hostage along with the leaders of the other UEO confederations.
20	20	"Abalon"	Les Sheldon	Patrick Hasburgh	May 1, 1994	68936
When Commander Ford believes he saw a mermaid at the bottom of the ocean, Captain Bridger orders him to take shore leave, but while on leave, Ford encounters the same woman again and soon finds himself ensnared in a mysterious scientist's unnatural experiment. Meanwhile, Lucas sneaks away to a party where Julianna and he may go “all the way.” Special guest star: Charlton Heston
21	21	"Such Great Patience"	Bryan Spicer	David Kemper	May 8, 1994	68934
The seaQuest makes the biggest discovery in Human history when they discover an alien starship entombed in an undersea rock face; trapped there for over a million years. When an away team goes inside the ship, they find that they might not be the only thing aboard it.
22	22	"The Good Death"	David J. Burke	Story by : Hans Tobeason & Douglas Burke; Teleplay by : Hans Tobeason	May 15, 1994	68931
The seaQuest is tricked into torpedoing a ship carrying dozens of child refugees, led by Cynthia Westphalen, Kristin's daughter. When their launch is damaged, Commander Ford, Shan, and the Westphalens must take refuge in the Amazonian Confederation, whose brutal leader believes the seaQuest has sent assassins after him. Guest starring: Luis Guzmán
23	23	"Higher Power"	John T. Kretchmer	David J. Burke & Patrick Hasburgh	May 22, 1994	68937
An emotional time is at hand as the seaQuest's tour of duty comes to an end; Chief Crocker faces his retirement and the end of his marriage, Commanders Ford and Hitchcock are offered the same command, and Captain Bridger and Dr. Westphalen begin a romantic relationship. Most emotional of all is Lucas who realizes that his father is hardly a part of his life anymore. However, when the Earth's crust begins to crack open underneath his father's power plant, the world is threatened by an unstoppable rise in ocean temperature which will melt the polar caps. With lava seeping into the sea, Bridger must sacrifice the seaQuest in order to save the world. Final appearances: Stephanie Beacham as Dr. Westphalen, Stacy Haiduk as Lt. Cmdr. Hitchcock, Royce D. Applegate as Chief Crocker

=== Season 2 (1994–95) ===
No. overall	No. in season	Title	Directed by	Written by	Original release date	Prod. code
24	1	"Daggers"	Bryan Spicer	Jonathan Falls	September 18, 1994	69704A/B
The crew of the new seaQuest shove off from New Cape Quest, Florida, but their shakedown cruise is interrupted when Genetically Engineered Life Forms (G.E.L.F.s) revolt and seize control of their island colony as well as a defensive weapons space base and threaten to destroy the Human race. Note: Originally shown as a feature-length episode, which was later cut into two separate episodes for syndication.
25	2	"The Fear That Follows"	Robert Wiemer	Clifton Campbell	September 25, 1994	69702
The engineers of the alien spacecraft that the original seaQuest discovered before her destruction receive the message sent by the crew and relay their intentions, through Darwin, to make first contact with the Human race. While the crew are ecstatic, General Thomas and a hot-shot UEO lieutenant can only see things from a military perspective.
26	3	"Sympathy for the Deep"	Bruce Seth Green	Carleton Eastlake	October 2, 1994	69701
A parapsychologic experiment gone terribly wrong and has driven the residents of the peaceful Miranda Colony to near insanity, including Captain Bridger's old girlfriend, who pleads with him for help. When the seaQuest arrives, they too are affected.
27	4	"Vapors"	Les Sheldon	David J. Burke	October 9, 1994	69710
While on shore leave, Captain Bridger and Dr. Smith struggle with a possible romance after rumors about their love life sweep through the seaQuest. Meanwhile, Henderson and O'Neill go out on a date, while Commander Ford, Brody and Ortiz try to find dates. On their shore leave, Piccolo, Lucas and Dagwood respond to Piccolo's father's plea for help. Special guest star: Dom DeLuise
28	5	"Playtime"	Robert Wiemer	Lawrence Hertzog	October 23, 1994	69703
A distant call for help pulls the seaQuest through an underwater anomaly, propelling the boat 225 years into the future where they find that mankind has destroyed itself, leaving only two teenaged kids as the only Human life left on Earth.
29	6	"The Sincerest Form of Flattery"	Jesús Salvador Treviño	Carleton Eastlake	November 13, 1994	69708
A programmer obtains a computerized copy of Captain Bridger's personality and uses it to automate an experimental submarine. When the project goes awry, the sub breaks free and begins attacking UEO bases. Bridger must go one-on-one with himself before the sub can destroy the seaQuest and level New Cape Quest with a missile attack which will kill everyone in the city.
30	7	"By Any Other Name"	Burt Brinckerhoff	Lawrence Hertzog	November 20, 1994	69707
A distress call from an underwater horticultural colony brings the seaQuest and her crew to investigate. However, the seemingly benign colony is not what it appears to be when a flower picked by Henderson is brought back to the boat and begins to mutate.
31	8	"When We Dead Awaken"	Annette Haywood-Carter	Clifton Campbell	November 27, 1994	69706
Lieutenant Brody's mother suddenly reappears in her son's life after being cryogenically frozen for twenty-two years, though their reunion may be short lived as she is soon targeted by an assassin – an assassin who's affiliated with someone the seaQuest crew is familiar with.
32	9	"Special Delivery"	Gus Trikonis	Patrick Hasburgh	December 11, 1994	69711
When Dr. Smith performs psychological evaluations on the crew, Commander Ford allows Dagwood to take shore leave. Trouble soon arises when he is accused of murdering the man who created him, something he does not remember doing. Sentenced to life in prison, Ford and Brody attempt to give Dagwood a small taste of a life he's never had and seemingly never will.
33	10	"Dead End"	Steven Robman	Carleton Eastlake	December 18, 1994	69712
Lucas, Brody, O'Neill and Henderson are pulled beneath the Earth's surface into a cavern while in a seaLaunch. With not enough air for them all to return to the surface, they must take their chances in a lottery. When Lucas comes up short, he must come to terms with being condemned to death.
34	11	"Meltdown"	Anson Williams	Tom Szolossi	January 8, 1995	69705
An undersea mining operation raises the temperature in the South Atlantic, releasing a behemoth prehistoric crocodile from its icy tomb which threatens the life of local inhabitants, including an undersea farming team led by Commander Ford's family.
35	12	"Lostland"	Bruce Seth Green	Ted Raimi & David J. Burke	January 15, 1995	69714
On a deep diving mission, Commander Ford discovers an ancient gold helmet proving that the lost continent of Atlantis once existed. However, when Captain Bridger and Ortiz try the helmet on, they are consumed by the ancient curse sealed within and begin lashing out at the crew.
36	13	"And Everything Nice"	Burt Brinckerhoff	Lawrence Hertzog	January 22, 1995	69715
While up-world, Lucas falls for a beautiful woman and asks to resign from his position aboard the boat. However, he soon becomes ensnared in an elaborate scheme to seize control of the seaQuest and deal a crippling blow to the UEO.
37	14	"Dream Weaver"	Oscar L. Costo	Clifton Campbell	February 19, 1995	69713
When a comet splashes into the water near seaQuest's location, it mysteriously disintegrates into particles, which cocoons the boat and impregnates it with an aggressive alien predator that disables the ship and attacks the crew. Special guest star: Mark Hamill as Tobias LeConte
38	15	"Alone"	David J. Burke	Carleton Eastlake	February 26, 1995	69717
A paranormal being known as "The Avatar" begins to threaten the world with his ability to place government officials into comas, including Secretary General McGath. As the UEO places all known psychics into concentration camps to try to stop "The Avatar", Dr. Smith must use her own psychic powers to confront him before it's too late.
39	16	"Watergate"	Casey O. Rohrs	Patrick Hasburgh	March 5, 1995	69716
On a mission to escort rock star Sarah Toenin to a USO show, Lucas and O'Neill discover that nearby Solitaire Island is, in fact, an ancient pyramid. Upon making the discovery, Sarah speaks in strange tongues that O'Neill recognizes as Ancient Greek, foretelling the coming of Neptune, the God of the sea.
40	17	"Something in the Air"	Steven Robman	Lawrence Hertzog	March 19, 1995	69718
The crew protects a group of researchers at an abandoned mining outpost while they study an ancient chest found buried in the Mediterranean. However, the chest turns out to be a Pandora's Box that unleashes a demon on the seaQuest team.
41	18	"Dagger Redux"	Oscar L. Costo	Patrick Hasburgh	April 2, 1995	69719
A legendary computer hacker known as "The Marauder" breaks Mariah out of prison to use her desire for revenge against Captain Bridger to destroy the seaQuest, leaving the sea free to be mined for prehistoric insect fuel whom "The Marauder" believes to be the missing element in cold fusion. Meanwhile, feeling stagnated aboard the boat, O'Neill takes a leave of absence but soon finds himself in Mariah's clutches.
42	19	"The Siamese Dream"	Jesús Salvador Treviño	Jonathan Brandis & David J. Burke	April 30, 1995	69723
When Piccolo and Dagwood mysteriously share a nightmare, Dr. Smith takes them to a parapsychology facility to try to help them, administered by her former love, Clay Marshall. However, Marshall is planting the dreams in an attempt to gain access to the seaQuest.
43	20	"Blindsided"	Anson Williams	Clifton Campbell	September 13, 1995	69720
When his airplane crashes in the South American jungle, Piccolo is kidnapped by a ruthless dictator from a militant confederation who has been secretly creating cloaked artificial life-forms that have gone out of control. Note: Originally scheduled to air the same night as the season two finale, this episode finally aired one week before the season three premiere.
44	21	"Splashdown"	Anson Williams	Carleton Eastlake	May 21, 1995	69722
After receiving a plea for help from Commander Keller, a massive alien starship draws seaQuest from the water and takes the crew billions of light-years away to the far distant world of Hyberion where they are dropped in the middle of a civil war that threatens to destroy the boat and all aboard. Special guest star: Mark Hamill as Tobias LeConte Final appearances: Marco Sanchez as Sensor Chief Ortiz, Rosalind Allen as Dr. Smith

=== Season 3 (SeaQuest 2032) (1995–96) ===
No. overall	No. in season	Title	Directed by	Written by	Original release date	Prod. code
45	1	"Brave New World"	Anson Williams	Clifton Campbell	September 20, 1995	K0403
In the ten years since Captain Nathan Bridger and the crew of seaQuest mysteriously disappeared off the face of the Earth, Captain Oliver Hudson leads a search for the lost submarine as a fascist Australian confederation grows its sphere of influence above and below the sea. When seaQuest reappears on Earth, it may be just the miracle the UEO needs to stop the Alliance of Macronesia's intent of world domination. Special guest star: Roy Scheider
46	2	"In the Company of Ice and Profit"	Jesús Salvador Treviño	Patrick Hasburgh	September 27, 1995	K0404
As the crew chafes against the hard-as-nails attitude of Captain Hudson, Larry Deon of Deon International plots to send an iceberg the size of New England towards Saudi Arabia, which, when melted, would flood the Saudi desert, increasing the demand for his water purification technologies. To prevent Hudson from destroying the iceberg, Deon plants Macronesian refugees on its surface, led by a former member of seaQuest's crew: Lieutenant Benjamin Krieg. Special guest star: John D'Aquino Final appearance: John D'Aquino as Lieutenant Krieg
47	3	"Smoke on the Water"	Oscar L. Costo	Lee Goldberg & William Rabkin	October 11, 1995	K0406
When UEO haulers begin to mysteriously disappear, the seaQuest is ordered to stand guard and defend the ships. However, this mission reunites Hudson with his long-lost love. Meanwhile, when Dagwood encounters a group of Daggers up-world, he considers leaving seaQuest, and Lucas must learn about the responsibilities of being an officer.
48	4	"Destination Terminal"	Bruce Seth Green	Javier Grillo-Marxuach	October 18, 1995	K0407
When a revolutionary new underwater train heads out on her maiden voyage, Lucas is ordered by Captain Hudson to go along and observe, while Commander Ford and Henderson also take a ride on a secret date. However, when Deon International plots to keep the air travel business at number one, they sabotage the train and kill the engineer, leaving Lucas to stop the locomotive before it crashes.
49	5	"Chains of Command"	Anson Williams	Lee Goldberg & William Rabkin	November 1, 1995	K0408
When UEO missiles are launched against a Macronesian outpost, Captain Hudson is ordered to relieve his former commanding officer, Admiral Vanalden, who has seized control of a secret military base and plans to plunge the Human race into a state of nuclear war.
50	6	"Brainlock"	Anson Williams	Naren Shankar & Javier Grillo-Marxuach	January 12, 1996	K0401
On the eve of the signing of the new UEO charter, President Alexander Bourne and Larry Deon conspire to gain control of Lieutenant Fredericks' psyche-implant in order to program her to assassinate Secretary General McGath and cripple the UEO beyond repair.
51	7	"Spindrift"	Oscar L. Costo	Carleton Eastlake	November 8, 1995	K0410
After rescuing a group of children from a Macronesian attack, Henderson is captured and sentenced to death by President Alexander Bourne. Unwilling to accept this, Captain Hudson organizes a rescue mission, one that puts Lieutenant Brody's life in extreme jeopardy. Final appearance: Edward Kerr as Lieutenant Brody
52	8	"Equilibrium"	Anson Williams	Naren Shankar & Javier Grillo-Marxuach	November 15, 1995	K0411
Upon discovering a viral outbreak caused by a rescue mission mounted by the original seaQuest over a decade earlier, Lucas develops a method to counteract the agent. However, when Captain Bridger arrives on the scene and proposes to let the pathogen naturally break down, seaQuest soon finds itself locked in mortal combat with its former captain. Special guest star: Roy Scheider
53	9	"Resurrection"	Oscar L. Costo	Lee Goldberg & William Rabkin	December 6, 1995	K0412
After faking his own death, environmental radical Max Scully once again encounters the seaQuest and plans to use the ship's laser banks to detonate an underwater nuclear stockpile that will destroy the Human race, save for a select few within his environmental paradise of Ecotopia. Piccolo finds out that he didn't pass the officer's exam, but Captain Hudson gives him a field commission as Warrant Officer
54	10	"Good Soldiers"	Jesús Salvador Treviño	Naren Shankar	December 20, 1995	K0405
Captain Bridger, Lucas, Commander Ford, and Dagwood infiltrate a former UEO base, now in the hands of Macronesia, to locate a set of top-secret data crystals containing information on crimes against humanity—crimes that Bridger and Ford were accessories to. Special guest star: Roy Scheider Final appearance: Roy Scheider as Captain Bridger
55	11	"Second Chance"	Frederick King Keller	Carleton Eastlake	December 27, 1995	K0402
A freak imbalance in one of seaQuest's reactor cores creates a time displacement sphere around the boat that rockets the ship back in time to October 1962, where they find that all of mankind has been destroyed as a result of the Cuban Missile Crisis. With no choice, the crew must travel back further in time to try to prevent the event.
56	12	"Reunion"	Anson Williams	Carleton Eastlake	January 28, 1996	K0413
On a diplomatic mission, Henderson discovers that her former love is now a prisoner and forced to work as slave labour. She also finds that Mason Freeman, Larry Deon's hired gun, is also a prisoner. When the two of them instigate a prison break and steal a submarine, they capture a UEO science outpost and hold the science team hostage. Final Appearance: Peter DeLuise as Dagwood
57	13	"Weapons of War"	Steve Beers	Javier Grillo-Marxuach	June 9, 1996	K0409
As seaQuest patrols a free trade zone between the UEO and Macronesia, Lieutenant O'Neill's online romance turns out to be a defector from an elusive Asian power known as the Chaodai; a power that attacks both the UEO and Macronesia with its impressive sub-fighter capability. In this final adventure, one member of seaQuest's crew will not live to see another day.

== See also ==
- List of underwater science fiction works
