= Fauser =

Fauser is a German surname. Notable people with the surname include:

- Gerrit Fauser (born 1989), German professional ice hockey player
- Jörg Fauser (1944–1987), German writer, poet and journalist
- Mark Fauser, American actor, director, screenwriter, and producer
