= Brent Briscoe =

American actor and screenwriter

- Born: May 21, 1961; Moberly, Missouri, U.S.
- Died: October 18, 2017 (aged 56); Burbank, California, U.S.
- Occupations: Actor, writer
- Years active: 1991–2017

Brent Briscoe (May 21, 1961 – October 18, 2017) was an American character actor and screenwriter. He was best known for his role as JJ on Parks and Recreation (2011–2015).

== Early life ==
Briscoe was born in Moberly, Missouri. After completing his education at the University of Missouri, Briscoe launched his career as a theater actor.

== Career ==
He then segued into screenwriting and acting in feature films. He moved to Los Angeles permanently after working with Billy Bob Thornton on Sling Blade. He also frequently worked with Mark Fauser, who was his college roommate.

== Death ==
Briscoe was hospitalized in October 2017 after suffering a fall. It led to internal bleeding and heart complications that resulted in his death on October 18, 2017, at the age of 56.

== Filmography as actor ==
Year	Title	Role	Notes
1993	Ghost Brigade	Raider #2	
1996	Sling Blade	'Scooter' Hodges	
1997	U Turn	Boyd	
1998	Another Day in Paradise	Clem	
1998	Break Up	County Sheriff #2	
1998	A Simple Plan	Lou Chambers	
1999	The Minus Man	Chief of Police	
1999	The Thirteenth Year	John 'Big John' Wheatley	Television film
1999	Crazy in Alabama	Jury Foreman / Chester Vinson (voice)	
1999	The Green Mile	Bill Dodge	
1999	Man on the Moon	Heavyset Technician	
2000	Beautiful	Lurdy	
2001	Double Take	Junior Barnes	
2001	Madison	Tony Steinhardt	
2001	Driven	'Crusher'	
2001	Say It Isn't So	Detective Vic Vetter	
2001	Mulholland Drive	Detective Neal Domgaard	
2001	The Majestic	Sheriff Cecil Coleman	
2002	It's All About You	Bathroom Patron	
2002	Waking up in Reno	Russell Whitehead	
2002	Journey of Redemption	Badge	
2003	The Big Empty	Dan	
2004	Spider-Man 2	Garbage Man	
2005	Twitches	Painter	TV movie
2005	House	The Farmer	Episode: "Three Stories"
2006	Bon Cop, Bad Cop	Judd	
2006	Bachelor Party Vegas	Mel 'Big Gut Mel'	Video
2007	The Messengers	Plume	
2007	Spider-Man 2.1	Garbage Man	
2007	In the Valley of Elah	Detective Hodge	
2007	Mr. Woodcock	Barber #2	
2007	Home of the Giants	Prock	
2007	Randy and the Mob	Griff Postell	
2007	National Treasure: Book of Secrets	Michael O'Laughlen	
2008	Crazy	Doug Johnson	
2008	Black Crescent Moon	Earl	
2008	Yes Man	Homeless Guy	
2009	The Smell of Success	Shotgun Farmer	
2009	The Grind	Brent B.	
2009	Extract	Phil	
2010	The Killer Inside Me	Bum / The Stranger / Visitor	
2010	Bloodworth	Coble	
2010	Dirty Girl	Officer Perry	
2011–2015	Parks and Recreation	JJ	Recurring role
2012	Jayne Mansfield's Car	Bobby	
2012	The Dark Knight Rises	Veteran Cop	
2012	Born Wild	Kyle Rich	
2012	Ambush at Dark Canyon	Morgan Heinz	
2013	Beneath	Mundy	
2013-2014	Hell on Wheels	Jimmy 'Two Squaws'	Guest role
2014	Zombeavers	Winston Gregorson	
2014	Atlas Shrugged Part III: Who Is John Galt?	Dispatcher	
2014	Hello, My Name Is Frank	Puggis Tripp	
2015	Justified	Luther Kent	Episode: "Noblesse Oblige"
2016	Term Life	Officer Murphy	
2016	Goliath	Beach Bum	
2017	Twin Peaks	Detective Dave Macklay	Recurring role
2017	Brooklyn Nine-Nine	Matthew Langdon	Last role Episode: "Crime and Punishment"
2019	5th of July	Dakota	

== Filmography as writer ==
Year	Title	Notes
1994	Evening Shade	2 episodes
1996	The Right to Remain Silent	Teleplay
2002	Waking Up in Reno	
