= List of seaQuest characters =

This is the complete list of the characters of seaQuest DSV, renamed seaQuest 2032 during its third and final season. The series went through significant cast changes after every season it was on the air.

== Table of main cast members ==
Key
Main	Actor received "Starring" credit that season
Recurring	Actor appears in two or more episodes that season
Guest	Actor appears in only one episode that season

Actor	Character	Seasons		
Actor	Character	1	2	3
Roy Scheider	Captain Nathan Bridger	Main	Main	Recurring
Stacy Haiduk	Lieutenant Commander Katherine Hitchcock	Main		
Don Franklin	Commander Jonathan Ford	Main	Main	Main
Jonathan Brandis	Lucas Wolenczak	Main	Main	Main
John D'Aquino	Lieutenant Benjamin Krieg	Main		Guest
Royce D. Applegate	Chief Manilow Crocker	Main		
Ted Raimi	Lieutenant JG Tim O'Neill	Main	Main	Main
Marco Sanchez	Sensor Chief Miguel Ortiz	Main	Main	
Darwin	Darwin	Main	Main	Main
Stephanie Beacham	Dr. Kristin Westphalen	Main		
Rosalind Allen	Dr. Wendy Smith		Main	
Edward Kerr	Lieutenant James Brody		Main	Main
Michael DeLuise	Warrant Officer Anthony Piccolo		Main	Main
Kathy Evison	Lieutenant JG Lonnie Henderson		Main	Main
Peter DeLuise	Dagwood		Main	Main
Michael Ironside	Captain Oliver Hudson			Main
Elise Neal	Lieutenant J.J. Fredericks			Main

First season cast.

== First season main characters ==
=== Captain Nathan Bridger ===
Captain Nathan Hale Bridger (Roy Scheider; main seasons 1 & 2, recurring season 3) is the commanding officer of both UEO submarines named seaQuest DSV and the designer of the boats in the show's first two seasons. Scheider became displeased with the direction of the series during the second season, as well as the "episodic" nature of the series (he believed that the show should contain long-running story and character arcs) and chose to exit the series at the end of the second season. For season 3, he was replaced by actor Michael Ironside, who portrayed Captain Oliver Hudson, although he continued to appearas a guest in season 3. "Good Soldiers", which was the character's last appearance, originally did not include Bridger at all; Scheider's character was written into the script in order to fulfill contractual obligations.

=== Dr. Kristin Westphalen ===
Dr. Kristin Westphalen (Stephanie Beacham; season 1) was a Physical oceanography and the Chief Medical Officer of the seaQuest and leader of the science team aboard the ship. Before joining seaQuest, Dr. Westphalen had attempted to contact Nathan Bridger in the name of scientific research, however, she was informed that he was incommunicado. The two of them did not meet on the best of terms as Bridger, still in civilian clothing, snickered at her diatribe against Commander Ford, leading her to accuse him of being a stowaway. The two gradually formed a working relationship as Bridger assumed command of the vessel and put emphasis on the scientific mission of the seaQuest over the military one.

=== Lucas Wolenczak ===
Lucas Wolenczak (Jonathan Brandis) was born in Danbury, Connecticut, US and afterwards his family moved to Buffalo. Lucas was a highly intelligent teenager who graduated magna-cum-laude with a degree in Applied Science of Artificial Intelligence from Stanford University, achieving a GPA that has been unbroken. When his parents divorced, Lucas' father, Dr. Wolenczak, one of the world's most valued scientists, was able to pull some strings allowing Lucas to serve aboard the seaQuest DSV as part of the boat's scientific contingent. After the events with the space war and Captain Bridger leaving to be with his grandson, Lucas was not welcome as a civilian on the SeaQuest under the new Captain so he chose to enlist in the Navy to become a UEO officer. He is referred to as Ensign (O1 rank) throughout the final season of the show.

=== Commander Jonathan Ford ===
Commander Jonathan Devin Ford (Don Franklin) comes from a very financially well off family, his father owning "Ford Freeport: Aquacultural Engineering", one of the largest undersea farming companies in the world. He had a bad relationship with his father and brother. In 2022 a sharp raise in the temperature of the water in the South Atlantic, caused by an undersea mining operation, a Deinosuchus (gigantic prehistoric crocodile) thawed out and was threatening the local ecosystem and the life of the local people. With the help of his family they stopped the creature and settled their differences. Ford's father decided to take a year off from work and give Jonathan's younger brother Ben the run of the company. His mother is deceased.

The character of Ford was originally supposed to have a far different background, originally having him been a poor kid from Chicago who joined the navy to get away from his gang life after witnessing the death of his older brother. Since this was never established in the first year (except for the novelization of the pilot episode and non canon sources such as the others novels and an issue of the comic) it was disregarded for the rest of the series.

=== Lieutenant Commander Katherine Hitchcock ===
Lieutenant Commander Katherine Hitchcock (Stacy Haiduk; season 1) was the Chief Engineer of the seaQuest DSV 4600 following her refit in 2018. While at the naval academy, she, along with Benjamin Krieg, were top of their class, and were eventually wed. However, the marriage only lasted a year. Being Chief Engineer, Hitchcock was also third in command aboard the seaQuest and was placed in command in several occasions, such as the Liberté space station incident where Commander Ford had been infected with an unknown virus and was unable to perform his duties.

=== Lieutenant Benjamin Krieg ===
Lieutenant Benjamin Krieg (John D'Aquino; main season 1, guest season 3) served as seaQuest`s supply and morale officer. He had previously attended the naval academy with Captain Bridger's son Robert and with Katherine Hitchcock, whom he was later wed to for a year. While at the academy, he painted the homecoming mule pink, something that Captain Bridger later found amusing. Krieg had aspirations of a command at sea, but, he never was able to fulfill that dream. Krieg was involved in a few minor transgressions during his tour of duty, such as attempting to extort an Arctic research outpost by selling them thermal underwear at an inflated price, as well as sneaking two pounds of outlawed ground beef aboard the boat with the intention of making a real cheeseburger.

=== Lieutenant JG Tim O'Neill ===
Lieutenant JG Tim O'Neill (Ted Raimi) was the communications officer of the seaQuest DSV 4600, originally serving under Captain Marilyn Stark. He remained aboard the boat after she had been relieved of duty and the seaQuest was refitted to serve as more of a research vessel. O'Neill specialized in foreign languages, was fluent in at least a dozen and could adequately speak several others. He also shared some sort of unknown psychic link with Darwin which allowed him to sense when Darwin was ill. A religious man since childhood, O'Neill was taught to believe that evolution topped out with mankind and had a difficult time believing in intelligent life on other planets, although, secretly wished that it existed.

The character of O'Neill was originally supposed to be a character named Garry Stephen Bachmann from Ottawa, Canada. This was then changed to be a woman named MacKenna O'Neill, then the character was changed back to a male and renamed "Mack O'Neill". This name was used right up until filming was to begin, name tags designed for his uniforms that read "M. O'Neill" are known to exist before it was ultimately changed to "Tim".

=== Chief Manilow Crocker ===
Chief Manilow Crocker (Royce D. Applegate; season 1) was on the brink of retirement when Admiral Noyce personally asked him to sign aboard seaQuest when it was put back to sea in 2018. Crocker had served together with Captain Bridger before and, as a result, didn't regret his decision to serve one more tour with his old friend. As Chief of Security aboard seaQuest, Crocker was responsible for the safety of all aboard. On more than one occasion, he was ordered to board enemy vessels and colonies to take the occupants into custody. Crocker was also the first Human being to lay eyes on an actual alien when the seaQuest found an ancient alien starship entombed in an underwater rock face. The alien fired at Crocker, but, it was merely a method of transportation which moved Crocker to a holding area aboard the alien ship, before finally returning him to seaQuest.

=== Sensor Chief Miguel Ortiz ===
Sensor Chief Miguel Ortiz (Marco Sanchez; seasons 1 & 2) was a member of seaQuest's original crew under Captain Stark. After she was relieved of duty, he stayed on, serving again under Nathan Bridger's command. As the Sensor Chief, Ortiz was responsible for controlling the boat's WSKRs (Wireless Sea Knowledge Retrieval Satellites) and was also involved in various away missions. He could understand Spanish and had a knowledge of Greek mythology, particularly that of Atlantis. He was eventually killed when the Seaquest‘s crew got involved in the Hyperion civil war.

The character that ultimately became Ortiz underwent two radical changes before becoming what it did. First he was a man named Drew and then was changed to being the son of a rich Vietnamese family named Ngyuen Ky before settling on making him Cuban, the name originally being Mundo Ortiz.

=== Darwin ===
Darwin is a dolphin. He is able to communicate to the crew through the assistance of a translation device known as the vo-corder, and to navigate throughout the Seaquest via a series of water-filled access tunnels leading to the ship's moon pool openings, where he could interact more directly with the rest of the crew. Before accepting command of the Seaquest, Nathan Bridger, while living on an island, befriended and began working on communicating with and training Darwin, using hand-signals to communicate. The two were close friends, and even in his capacity as captain, Bridger often referred to him as "My dolphin", treating him at times like a very fond pet, and at other times like an equal, even diverting the ship from a research mission in order to seek medical assistance when Darwin became sick, citing that he was a member of the crew just as much as anyone else.

== Second season main characters ==
=== Dr. Wendy Smith ===
Dr. Wendy Smith (Rosalind Allen; season 2) came aboard the seaQuest DSV 4600 II in 2021 after the first seaQuest had been destroyed by Captain Nathan Bridger the previous year in an attempt to seal a lava pool that threatened to melt the world's polar caps. When Dr. Kristin Westphalen elected not to sign aboard the new seaQuest, Dr. Smith won the most coveted medical position in the UEO, that of the chief medical officer of the flagship. She was a licensed parapsychologist and had ESP. Smith was eventually killed when the Seaquest's crew got involved in the Hyperion civil war.

The character of Dr. Smith was originally two different characters: Diane Page, a 35-year-old African American Ph.D. and Wendy Woo, a 25-year-old M.D. The producers of the show originally wanted Tamara Tunie and Kelly Hu respectively.

Kathy Evison originally auditioned for the role of Dr. Smith. Although she did not get the role of Smith, the show's producers liked her enough to hire her and created a new character, Lonnie Henderson, for her to play.

The episode "Alone", which focused extensively on Dr. Smith's powers, infuriated actor Edward Kerr (Brody) to the point that he stormed off the set and did not appear in the episode.

=== Lieutenant James Brody ===
Lieutenant James Brody (Edward Kerr; seasons 2 & 3), at the age of three, was involved with his mother in a murder cover-up at the (accidental) hands of Franklin Thomas. Contracting the P-Core A virus, Brody's mother was place in cryogenic suspension and he was sent to live with his grandparents, who "let (him) get away with murder. After joining the navy, Brody led a stealth invasion during the North Korean Crisis in 2010, which Captain Bridger considered to be a "nifty piece of work". At some point in his life, Brody sired a son with a woman. However, being a career-military and a private man, Brody never told any of the seaQuest crew of that aspect of his life. He himself only found out about the then 10 year old boy after the ship returned from Hyperion and the mother of the boy decided to contact him after one of her parents had recently died.

Brody ultimately died later that year in a rescue mission to save Lieutenant Henderson from a Macronesian death sentence. His last words were "With your shield or on it." The two actors originally considered for the role of Brody were Dan Gauthier and Paul Gross.

=== Warrant Officer Anthony Piccolo ===
Anthony Piccolo (Michael DeLuise; seasons 2 & 3) first boarded the seaQuest as a Seaman in the episode Daggers, the first episode of the second season. He was an experimental ex con, let out from prison on an early release program where they conducted science experiments on volunteers. Piccolo was offered and then received a pair of genetically altered gills, allowing him to breathe underwater like a fish. He was put on seaQuest because that's where the parole board thought he would be most useful. One of Picollo's most important aspects, according to producer Carleton Eastlake, is "he's also the most human of the whole crew, because he's really very unsophisticated."

=== Lieutenant JG Lonnie Henderson ===
Lieutenant Lenore "Lonnie" Ellen Henderson (Kathy Evison; seasons 2 & 3) signed aboard the seaQuest DSV-II as a helmsman in 2021. As a first generation naval officer, she was a bit rough around the edges in terms of proper protocol. She successfully was able to smuggle her stuffed bear Addison aboard seaQuest, much to the consternation of Commander Ford. Henderson initially showed an interest in Lieutenant O'Neill and the two spent some shore leave together. However, O'Neill was uncomfortable dating someone he served with and the two remained just friends. She also offered herself to Lucas Wolenczak when it was believed that he was going to die in a cavern.

=== Dagwood ===
Dagwood (Peter DeLuise; seasons 2 & 3) was the prototype G.E.L.F. He originally did not have a name, but, adopted the name "Dagwood" as a joke, since G.E.L.F.s were also known as "Daggers". Dagwood was the imperfect prototype Dagger, intended as supersoldiers, but, he was reassigned to custodial duties, eventually being placed aboard the new seaQuest DSV in 2021. He proved his worth to the seaQuest crew almost immediately when he saved Lieutenant O'Neill's life when a large turbine collapsed on top of him, lifting the immense vent off of him. He was also able to convince Mariah, leader of the G.E.L.F. uprising that the G.E.L.F. baby was in fact a human.

== Third season main characters ==
=== Captain Oliver Hudson ===
Captain Oliver Hudson (Michael Ironside) was the third commanding officer of the seaQuest after Captain Marilyn Stark and Captain Nathan Bridger. Hudson assumed command of the boat in 2032. After the seaQuest mysteriously disappeared off the face of the Earth in 2022, Hudson began a ten year search for the missing ship and crew while in command of a slow-moving, long-distance hauler, which he believed would give him the best chance of finding it. Hudson replaced Roy Scheider's Nathan Bridger as the star of the series for season 3. The producers wanted a character different from Bridger, so instead of being the relaxed fatherly figure Hudson had more of a military personality. Using some unused aspects from Bridgers original character profile in the season 1 writers bible Hudson enlisted in the US Navy as a way of rebelling against his father, the only onscreen evidence of this was an enlisted Good Conduct Medal on his ribbon bar. The aspects concerning his father would have been dealt with had the series not ended, in what would have been the 15th episode of the season, "Depths of Deceit".

=== Lieutenant J.J. Fredericks ===
Lieutenant J.J. Fredericks (Elise Neal) had served with Captain Hudson aboard the hauler he commanded prior to both of them signing aboard seaQuest. Hudson considered her his best student and believed that she dedicated her whole life to her duty. While training to pilot a Spectre-Demon class subfighter, Fredericks accidentally crashed it, almost drowning in the process. She became extremely fearful of ever piloting it again and since the UEO had invested so much in her training, they convinced her to wear a "psyche-implant"; a device that literally "programmed the scare out of her". The device also gave the UEO 24 hour access to every feeling that she had, but, she was willing to deal with the inherent humiliation in order to become the best subfighter pilot in the UEO. Unfortunately, Larry Deon and President Alexander Bourne were able to gain access to her psyche-implant and reprogrammed it to coerce her to assassinate UEO Secretary General McGath. Thanks to the efforts of Lieutenant Brody and Ensign Wolenczak, Fredericks was able to fight against their programming and McGath's life was saved. Unfortunately, during the Seaquest crew’s fight against the Chaodai, Fredericks’ life was lost when her subfighter was destroyed.

== Third season recurring characters ==
- Dr. Perry (Karen Fraction) – When seaQuest returned to Earth in 2032 after mysteriously disappearing ten years earlier, Dr. Wendy Smith was among the fatalities suffered in the Hyperion Civil War the seaQuest was forced into in 2022. With no Chief Medical Officer, Dr. Perry signed aboard the ship as Smith's replacement. During her time on the ship she performed several important tasks that save countless lives. Dr. Perry and Lucas were able to synthesize a cure for a mutated viral strain that threatened the crew of seaQuest.
- Lt. Commander Heiko Kimura (Julia Nickson) – A Chaodai sub fighter pilot that defected to the UEO in 2032 to warn them of the future threat posed by the Chaodai. She conducted an online relationship with Lt. O'Neill and used him to find the ship and get on board. When Tim confronted her about it later she told him that she didn't feel bad about tricking him, because the Chaodai represented a horror he couldn't imagine, and that he should have been glad to have his fantasy girl for as long as he did. Had the show continued she would have been a main character going forward.

== UEO Personnel ==
- Secretary General William Noyce (Richard Herd) – Ranked as admiral in the UEO navy, Noyce had served with Captain Bridger for many years prior to his appointment to seaQuest. Noyce was usually seaQuest`s liaison to UEO Headquarters and often relayed mission orders and other commands to the ship. Noyce had met future UEO secretary general Andrea Dre at Woodstock when his own car broke down. They remained friends for years afterwards. Noyce was made acting secretary general in the episode "The Last Lap at Luxury" following Dre's arrest for treason, forcing him into retirement from his military career. He appeared with the title in two earlier episodes, "The Stinger" and "Hide and Seek", suggesting the episodes were aired out of order.
- Secretary General Arthur McGath (Michael Costello) – Replacing William Noyce as the Secretary General of the UEO, McGath was frequently in contact with the seaQuest to issue new orders and missions. Possessing a high amount of respect for Captain Bridger, McGath refused to relieve him of command when a gold helmet believed to be from Atlantis cursed Bridger and caused him to behave irrationally, claiming he didn't want the last thing on the captain's record to read "relieved of command by the Secretary General".
- General Francis "Frank" Gideon Thomas (Jesse Doran) – A General seen in the US Army in 2019, then in the UEO Army as of 2021. Thomas was involved in a murder cover-up in his early adulthood involving Alison Brody resulting in the death of her friend. Realizing that she would be able to testify against him, Thomas conspired with a corrupt doctor to infect her with a fatal virus so that she wouldn't be able to incriminate him. Years later, Alison Brody, who had been in cryogenic stasis since her infection, emerged from her sleep. Worried, Thomas had her kidnapped and planned to kill her once and for all. Lieutenant James Brody, her son and member of the seaQuest crew, was able to intercept the general and rescue his mother. Although Thomas' fate is unknown, it can be inferred that he was likely discharged from the military due to his actions and sentenced to prison.

== seaQuest Crewmembers ==
- Chief Carleton (Dan Hildebrand) – One of the lead helmsmen aboard seaQuest, Carleton came on board after Stark was removed from command but before Bridger assumed command. He was a main fixture on the bridge from 2018 to mid 2019. He was on duty when the boat was heavily damaged after a lightning bolt struck the ship's communication's buoy. He, along with the bridge crew, was able to reroute power from one of the ship's WSKRs, operate the vessel, and save a downed French submarine. Carleton eventually left the ship and was replaced in 2019 by Chief William Shan.
- Lieutenant Dalton Phillips (Mark Fauser) – One of the weapons officers aboard the seaQuest, Phillips had served under the command of Captain Marilyn Stark prior to her dismissal as captain of the ship. When Bridger assumed command of the boat, Phillips remained on board.
- Dr. Joshua Levin (Timothy Omundson) – A member of the seaQuest's science and medical team. Assigned to the Aqua Sphere 7 outpost later that year, Levin, as well as the rest of the away team, became infected with an unknown virus spread to the station by the sunken French space station Liberté. They were eventually cured, and Levin remained onboard seaQuest for the rest of the year.
- Chief William Shan (Dustin Nguyen) – One of the helmsmen of the seaQuest, Shan was born in Brazil in one of the favelas prior to the newly formed Amazonian Confederation and is a descendant of Vietnamese boat people. He possesses extensive knowledge of his people's background and speaks Portuguese. A capable combat officer, Shan was often part of Chief Manilow Crocker's security teams.
- Helmswoman Tyler (Dorian Field) – One of the helmsmen of the seaQuest, Petty Officer Tyler joined the crew in early 2022, replacing Helmswoman Mackay. She faced some difficult situations during her tour on the ship. She was on duty when the UEO was being threatened by a powerful psychic known as the Avatar and was able to overcome the side effects caused by the "psychic battle" between Smith and the Avatar and keep control of the helm.

== Scientists ==
- Malcolm Lansdowne (Robert Engels) – A long-time friend of Nathan Bridger's, Malcolm Lansdowne maintained a dolphin research facility in the Caicos Key. When Darwin took ill during a mission to investigate a black smoker, Lansdowne was able to eventually determine that it was the bacteria in the smoker that had infected him in the first place. When Max Scully had attempted to thwart the efforts of whaling ships, he borrowed an extensive amount of money from Lansdowne in order to purchase an old-style Foxtrot-class submarine to combat the whalers.
- Martinson Hologram (W. Morgan Sheppard), "The Old Man", is the holographic representation of Professor Martinson was designed to offer a sounding board to the ship's captain in the event of a crisis. Although the navy refused to install the program, Lucas brought him on-line nevertheless. During his first year as captain of the seaQuest, Bridger confided in Martinson frequently and the hologram was able to provide invaluable information as well. When environmental extremists captured seaQuest, Martinson was able to adequately distract one of them, allowing Lieutenant Krieg to lock him inside Bridger's quarters.
- Dr. Raleigh Young (Roscoe Lee Browne) – A specialist in underwater volcanoes, Dr. Raleigh Young had developed a special "magma buoy" which could be launched into an undersea volcano and remain functional, despite the intense heat, which would allow researchers to know in weeks what originally would have taken years. Somewhat hypersensitive, Dr. Young could not understand why Captain Bridger would choose to worry about a sick dolphin rather than his important research. However, he soon came to understand Bridger's reasoning and implored him to seek a cure for his ailing friend. His magma buoy was eventually launched.
- Commander Scott Keller (Kent McCord) – Commander of the space shuttle Wayfarer, the first crewed Earth vehicle to reach Mars and back, Scott Keller had attended the naval academy with Nathan Bridger, with whom they remained competitively friendly. One night, as a favour to Bridger, Scott ate a dozen and a half of Organa Watt's, the woman who ran the women's dorm at the academy, terrible cookies so Bridger could sneak a girl out the back. However, while Keller opted for outer space, Bridger opted for inner space. Bridger and seaQuest eventually rescued Scott's Wayfarer capsule after an accident during re-entry forced them to splashdown near the Montegnard Confederation. He was eventually involved in the Hyperion civil war, with his final fate being a mystery.
- Professor Tobias LeConte (Mark Hamill) – Blinded by the magnificent light of a comet, Tobias was a child prodigy. At seven years old, he pinpointed the exact moment the universe was born. By age fourteen, he held Isaac Newton's chair at Cambridge. However, he was not fully human. Born on the planet Hyperion, eleven million light-years away from Earth, Tobias sent out a message of peace on a planet of conquest. His anti-expansion philosophies branded him a traitor for which he was sentenced to death. He fled to Earth and melded with the real Tobias LeConte, essentially giving the child life as the comet that blinded him also would have given him cancer, which his alien physiology was able to naturally fight off.

== Adversaries ==
- Maximilian "Max" Scully (Jonathan Banks) – A radical environmental activist who faked his death in the year 2011 after being disfigured by a bomb explosion he intended to use himself. By the late 2010s, Scully had borrowed money from Malcolm Lansdowne to purchase an old Russian Foxtrot-class submarine which he and his crew originally used to monitor the movements of illegal whaling ships. Convinced that the UEO wasn't going to do anything about the whalers, Scully took matters into his own hands and began firing live torpedoes at the whalers. Unfortunately, during one such instance, a torpedo missed its intended target and sank a cruise ship accidentally. His crew abandoned him and Scully eventually was apprehended by the seaQuest. Rather than be taken into custody, Scully launched himself out of a torpedo tube, leaving Captain Bridger to destroy his abandoned vessel. Scully was believed to be all but dead considering that he was nowhere near any land masses and had no choice but to swim to save himself. Somehow, Scully was able to survive and developed an undersea colony dedicated to the preservation of the Earth called "Ecotopia." Although he was still wanted for the deaths of the passengers of the cruise ship, the UEO granted him a full pardon when Ecotopia became a member of the UEO in 2032. Scully's ideals still had not changed as he took advantage of his tour of seaQuest to tap into the main computer of the sub. From Ecotopia, he was able to disable the ship's life support system and directed seaQuest`s pulse lasers at an underwater nuclear waste dump - the intention being to destroy the Human race, save for those within Ecotopia, whose descendants would return to the surface of the Earth generations later and protect the planet's environment, rather than ravage it. Scully was defeated by Captain Hudson, Lucas, and Elaine Morse, who managed to kill him. Even though his plans were thwarted, and a nuclear holocaust was prevented, Lucas hoped though that the peaceful Ecotopia colony would be Scully's legacy, not his lunacy.
- Mariah (Sam Jenkins) – Leader of the G.E.L.F. colony uprising, Mariah sought freedom for her and her people on their twenty first birthday in 2021. First seizing control of the colony, she led a group of daggers to UEO Headquarters in New Cape Quest. Once there, she captured General Thomas and a fully armed Navis-18 UEO submarine. Using Thomas' military command codes, she was able to gain access to the Ronald Reagan Memorial Laser Space Base where she plotted to destroy enough the world's air exchange plants, which would suffocate the human race, leaving the G.E.L.F.s as the only sentient life on the planet. She halted her plan when she realized that the G.E.L.F. baby that had recently been born at the colony was more human than her parents were due to spontaneous evolution and that destroying the human race would result in the ultimate destruction of the G.E.L.F.s as well. She released General Thomas and was imprisoned in a UEO detention facility.
- President Alexander Bourne (Michael York) – President of the Macronesian Alliance (formerly New Australia), Bourne rose to power during the ten years that seaQuest was missing. The ships in his naval fleet, the Lysander class, were capable of subduction; particle liquefication, which "turns land mass into soup" and allowed him to seize power in half of the Pacific Ocean. Bourne did not agree with the policies and limitations of the UEO and sought any means to discredit and defame them. As a result, and because of several concerns about human rights violations, the UEO imposed a trade embargo against Macronesia, which led to several conflicts between both governments.
- General Armand Stassi (Andrew Stahl) is Alexander Bourne's right hand man and the Highest Ranking officer in the Macronesian Military. He was with the President in the attempted take over of the Nexus Colony, which was ultimately thwarted thanks to the return of seaQuest and the help of Nathan Bridger.
- Larry Deon (Tim DeKay) – A business tycoon who served as chairman of Deon International, the largest supplier of most of the world's goods and resources. Deon International also operated restaurant chains, military development groups, and major sports franchises, such as the "Deon Demons". Deon, who "sold IBM off at a yard sale when he was 24", sought to conglomerate his empire with the entire world market, making Deon International "the only game in town". As manufacturer of the, allegedly, state of the art Lysander-class subfigher (high speed submersibles capable of engagements at speeds up to 300 knots), Deon International was able to neatly furnish Macronesia with their underwater war machines. Larry would soon conspire with President Bourne's attempt to assassinate Secretary General McGath in order to abolish the UEO. Captain Hudson was able to stop him and planned to bring him to justice, but before he could say anything, Mason Freeman, Deon's right-hand man, shot him to prevent Larry from incriminating himself or the company. While he was seriously injured, Deon was not killed. He remained in a coma.
- Mason Freeman (Ralph Wilcox) – Larry Deon's right-hand man, Freeman is more aggressive, ruthless, and in many ways, more cunning than his boss is. Larry ordered him to capture Captain Hudson and hold him hostage to further ensure that an iceberg in the Weddell Sea would not be destroyed by seaQuest. Hudson was able to overpower Freeman, but rather than send him to a UEO prison, he ordered Freeman sent back to Deon, to tell Larry that while he sent his best man, Hudson sent him right back. Freeman was later sent to sabotage the OmniPacific underwater train in order to keep Deon International's air travel services number one in long-distance traveling. Mason's efforts were thorough, but Lucas was able to safely stop the train and save the passengers. Freeman, however, was able to escape. Apparently not on speaking terms with Larry, Freeman shot his boss after Captain Hudson had arrested him, in order to stop Larry from incriminating Deon International in the plot to assassinate Secretary General McGath. Freeman was immediately arrested and imprisoned. Freeman, and Jason Pardee, a former love of Lieutenant Henderson, were able to escape prison and held a science team hostage in exchange for their own freedom. Freeman was also able to take Lucas and Henderson prisoner after they were sent over to the science station under the pretense of assistance. Plotting to kill Lucas to send a message to Captain Hudson, Henderson, Lucas, and the science team were able to escape. While Pardee was killed at the hands of Henderson, Freeman seemed to disappear. As the seaQuest futilely tries to find him, he happily rolls along the ocean floor in an underwater tank, singing to himself in contentment.

== Others ==
- President Hoy Chi (James Shigeta) is the President of the Montagnard Confederation. Chi had wished his state to remain a peaceful and supportive member of the UEO, but, also an important player within it.
- Julianna (Sarah Koskoff), AKA "Red Menace", was a brilliant computer hacker who worked alongside Martin Clemens (AKA "Mycroft") and Nick (AKA "Wolfman") in an attempt to make right the perceived wrongs of the world by diverting stolen funds from corrupt governments into places where they would be better served, such as hospitals.
- Navy Quartermaster Bickle (Denis Arndt) serves as a navy quartermaster. He was used to dealing and trading with Lieutenant Ben Krieg and had formed somewhat of a sarcastic relationship with him. While Bickle was highly qualified at his work he had an acrimonious relationship with his wife. Krieg had promised to turn him onto a good divorce lawyer, but Bickle was less than convinced since Krieg had to salute his ex-wife, Lieutenant Commander Hitchcock.
- Officer D Richardson (Peter Dumas) served as a back up crew bridge member. He was part of the UEO association that was on board the Seaquest and also served as a police swat guard to protect the cast members on the seaquest.
