= Karen Fraction =

American actress (1958–2007)

- Born: Karen Elizabeth Fraction; February 15, 1958; Flint, Michigan, United States
- Died: October 30, 2007 (aged 49); Largo, Florida, United States
- Other names: Karen E. Fraction; Karen Fraction-Hamilton
- Years active: 1986–2001
- Spouse: Lawrence Hamilton
- Website: http://www.karenfraction.com/

Karen Elizabeth Fraction Hamilton (February 15, 1958 – October 30, 2007) was an American actress, dancer and model from Flint, Michigan. She is probably best remembered as Dr. Perry, the Chief Medical Officer in seaQuest 2032, and Jennifer Parker, one of the main characters in the hit short-lived Nickelodeon television series My Brother and Me.

== Biography ==
During her second year at Adelphi University, where she earned a bachelor degree in communication arts in 1980, she was cast in a touring production of The Wiz. This eventually led her to Broadway, where she debuted in The Tap Dance Kid starring Hinton Battle. Other credits include a 1987 revival of Cabaret, Anything Goes, the 1991 revival of Oh, Kay! as well as touring Europe and Japan in Bob Fosse's Dancin'. She also participated in the famous 1985 concert version of Stephen Sondheim's Follies and performed at the Radio City Music Hall.

"If you can work on projects you believe in, have fun with and touch people's lives, that's success," she told The Flint Journal in 1994 after taking a starring role as Jennifer Parker in My Brother and Me. Although the show only lasted for the 1994/1995 season it brought her enough attention that she was cast as Dr. Perry in seaQuest 2032, replacing Rosalind Allen, although due to the show's move to a more military tone her part was a recurring character instead of a main character.

She has also appeared in commercials and magazine advertisements dating from the 1980s, including AT&T, K-Mart, Febreze and Denny's.

She died on October 30, 2007, five years after being diagnosed with breast cancer. She is survived by her two children, Lauren Elizabeth Jean and Lawrence Wm. Morris, and her husband Lawrence Hamilton.

== Filmography ==
- Follies in Concert (1986) .... Dancer
- Swamp Thing (TV) (1 episode) (1992) .... Tanda
- My Brother and Me (TV) (Main Character) (1994) .... Jennifer Parker
- seaQuest 2032 (TV) (Recurring Character) (1995–1996) .... Dr. Perry
- Our Son, the Matchmaker (1996) .... Claudia Wade
- Palmetto (1998) .... Plainclothes Cop
- Walker, Texas Ranger (TV) (In Harm's Way: Part 2) (1999) .... Judge Millhouse
- The First of May (1999) .... Doctor
- Sheena (TV) (2 episodes) (2001) .... Masuya / Miku
- Taina (TV) (Pilot) (2001) .... Dance Instructor
