= 18th CableACE Awards =

The 18th Annual CableACE Awards were held on November 16, 1996. Below are the nominees and the winners from that ceremony in the major categories.

== Winners and nominees ==
Winners in bold.

=== Movie or Miniseries ===
- **Truman** (HBO)
- The Late Shift (HBO)
- Sophie and the Moonhanger (Lifetime)
- Soul of the Game (HBO)
- The Tuskegee Airmen (HBO)

=== Dramatic Series ===
- **The Outer Limits** (Showtime)
- Avonlea (Disney Channel)
- Strangers (HBO)

=== Comedy Series ===
- **The Larry Sanders Show** (HBO)
- Exit 57 (Comedy Central)
- Mystery Science Theater 3000 (Comedy Central)

=== Actor in a Movie or Miniseries ===
- **Gary Sinise** – Truman (HBO)
- Robbie Coltrane – Cracker (Episode: "Brotherly Love") (A&E)
- Laurence Fishburne – The Tuskegee Airmen (HBO)
- Carl Lumbly – Nightjohn (Disney Channel)
- Courtney B. Vance – The Affair (HBO)

=== Actress in a Movie or Miniseries ===
- **Sela Ward** – Almost Golden: The Jessica Savitch Story (Lifetime)
- Anne Bancroft – Homecoming (Showtime)
- Kerry Fox – The Affair (HBO)
- Lela Rochon – Mr. and Mrs. Loving (Showtime)
- Cicely Tyson – The Road to Galveston (USA)

=== Supporting Actor in a Movie or Miniseries ===
- **Tom Hulce** – The Heidi Chronicles (TNT)
- Jason Bernard – Sophie and the Moonhanger (Lifetime)
- Dennis Boutsikaris – Chasing the Dragon (Lifetime)
- Andre Braugher – The Tuskegee Airmen (HBO)
- Stephen Root – The Road to Galveston (USA)

=== Supporting Actress in a Movie or Miniseries ===
- **Amanda Plummer** – The Right to Remain Silent (Showtime)
- Christine Lahti – The Four Diamonds (Disney Channel)
- Laura San Giacomo – The Right to Remain Silent (Showtime)
- Alison Steadman – Pride and Prejudice (A&E)
- Shelley Winters – Mrs. Munck (Showtime)

=== Actor in a Dramatic Special or Series ===
- **Danny Glover** – America's Dream (Episode: "Long Black Song") (HBO)
- Ben Cross – Poltergeist: The Legacy (Episode: "The Substitute") (Showtime)
- Mark Harmon – Strangers (Episode: "The Visit") (HBO)
- Michael Shulman – Lifestories: Families in Crisis (Episode: "Someone Had to be Benny") (HBO)
- Wesley Snipes – America's Dream (Episode: "The Boy Who Painted Christ Black") (HBO)

=== Actress in a Dramatic Special or Series ===
- **Donna Murphy** – Lifestories: Families in Crisis (Episode: "Someone Had to be Benny") (HBO)
- Tina Lifford – America's Dream (Episode: "Long Black Song") (HBO)
- Cherie Lunghi – Strangers (Episode: "The One You Love") (HBO)
- Amanda Plummer – The Outer Limits (Episode: "A Stitch in Time") (Showtime)
- Maureen Stapleton – Avonlea (Episode: "What a Tangled Web We Weave") (Disney Channel)

=== Actor in a Comedy Series ===
- **Garry Shandling** – The Larry Sanders Show (HBO)
- Brian Benben – Dream On (HBO)
- Michael McKean – Dream On (HBO)
- Jeffrey Tambor – The Larry Sanders Show (HBO)
- Rip Torn – The Larry Sanders Show (HBO)

=== Actress in a Comedy Series ===
- **Tracey Ullman** – Tracey Takes On... (HBO)
- Denny Dillon – Dream On (HBO)
- Janeane Garofalo – The Larry Sanders Show (HBO)
- Penny Johnson – The Larry Sanders Show (HBO)
- Wendie Malick – Dream On (HBO)

=== Children's Special or Series – 6 and Younger ===
- **The World of Peter Rabbit and Friends** (Episode: "The Tale Of The Flopsy Bunnies & Mrs. Tittlemouse") (The Family Channel)
- A Chanukah Mitzvah (Jewish TV Network)
- Allegra's Window (Nickelodeon)
- Gullah Gullah Island (Nickelodeon)
- Little Bear (Nickelodeon)

=== Children's Series – 7 and Older ===
- **The Composers' Specials** (HBO)
- Are You Afraid of the Dark? (Nickelodeon)
- Flash Forward (Disney Channel)
- Space Cases (Nickelodeon)
- The Secret World of Alex Mack (Nickelodeon)

=== Children's Special – 7 and Older ===
- **Nickelodeon Sports Theater with Shaquille O'Neal** (Episode: "4 Points") (Nickelodeon)
- Family Video Diaries (Episode: "Before You Go: A Daughter's Diary") (HBO)
- Johnny & Clyde (Showtime)
- Nick News (Episode: "The Body Trap") (Nickelodeon)
- The Little Riders (Disney Channel)

=== Children's Educational or Informational Special or Series ===
- **Nick News** (Nickelodeon)
- Justice Factory (Court TV)
- Teen Summit (Episode: "Living on the Street . . . On the Real") (BET)
- The Big Help Stories (Nickelodeon)

=== Animated Programming Special or Series ===
- **Duckman** (USA)
- Courage the Cowardly Dog (Episode: "The Chicken from Outer Space") (Cartoon Network)
- Dr. Katz, Professional Therapist (Comedy Central)
- Ren & Stimpy (Nickelodeon)
- Rocko's Modern Life (Nickelodeon)

=== Comedy Special ===
- **20 Years of Comedy on HBO** (HBO)
- HBO Comedy Hour (Episode: "Hazelle!") (HBO)
- Mr. Show (HBO)

=== Variety Special or Series ===
- **Tracey Takes On...** (HBO)
- Dennis Miller Live (HBO)
- Lifetime Applauds (Episode: "The Fight Against Breast Cancer") (Lifetime)
- Midnight Mac Starring Bernie Mac (HBO)

=== Music Special or Series ===
- **The South Bank Show** (Episode: "Wynton Marsalis") (Bravo)
- The Concert for the Rock and Roll Hall of Fame (HBO)
- VH1 Duets (VH1)
- VH1 Honors (VH1)
- VH1 Storytellers (VH1)

=== Documentary Special ===
- **Survivors of the Holocaust** (TBS)
- Investigative Reports (Episode: "Kamikaze") (A&E)
- Letting Go: A Hospice Journey (HBO)
- Paradise Lost: The Child Murders at Robin Hood Hills (HBO)
- Rain of Ruin (History)

=== Documentary Series ===
- **The Revolutionary War** (TLC)
- Biography (A&E)
- Crime Science (A&E)
- Lost & Found (FX)
- Mysteries of the Bible (A&E)

=== Talk Show Series ===
- **Politically Incorrect with Bill Maher** (Comedy Central)
- Charles Grodin (CNBC)
- Larry King Live (CNN)
- Reflections on the Silver Screen (AMC)
- The Howard Stern Show (E!)

=== Program Interviewer ===
- **Roy Firestone** – Up Close Primetime (ESPN)
- Larry King – Larry King Live (CNN)
- Howard Stern – The Howard Stern Show (E!)
- Mary Tillotson – CNN and Company (CNN)

=== News Special or Series ===
- **Investigative Reports** (Episode: "Seized by the Law") (A&E)
- Chernobyl: Legacy of a Meltdown (CNN)
- Investigative Reports (Episode: "Danger on the Rails") (A&E)
- Return to the Hot Zone (CNN)
- War on the Cocaine Cartel (CNN)

=== Newscaster ===
- **Bernard Shaw** and **Judy Woodruff** – Inside Politics (CNN)
- Joie Chen and Miles O'Brien – CNN Saturday/Sunday Morning News (CNN)
- Leon Harris and Donna Kelley – CNN Morning News (CNN)

=== Sports News Series ===
- **Sports Tonight** (CNN)
- Baseball Tonight (ESPN)
- NFL Game Day (ESPN)
- NFL Prime Monday (ESPN)
- SportsCenter (ESPN)

=== Sports Information Series ===
- **Real Sports with Bryant Gumbel** (HBO)
- Outside the Lines (ESPN)
- Peak Performance (TLC)
- The Sports Reporters (ESPN)
- Up Close Primetime (ESPN)

=== Sports Host ===
- **Chris Berman** – Baseball Tonight, NFL Halftime, and SportsCenter (ESPN)
- Verne Lundquist (TBS)
- Keith Olbermann (ESPN)
- Bob Page (Madison Square Garden)
- Al Trautwig (Madison Square Garden)

=== Performing Arts Special or Series ===
- **B.B. King: The Blues Summit** (A&E)
- My Life With Handel (Ovation)
- The South Bank Show (Episode: "Elaine Paige") (Bravo)
- The South Bank Show (Episode: "Luciano Pavarotti") (Bravo)
- Still/Here (Ovation)
