= Waking Up in Reno =

2002 film directed by Jordan Brady

- Theatrical release poster
- Directed by: Jordan Brady
- Written by: Brent Briscoe; Mark Fauser
- Produced by: Ben Myron; Robert Salerno; Dwight Yoakam; Billy Bob Thornton
- Starring: Billy Bob Thornton; Charlize Theron; Patrick Swayze; Natasha Richardson
- Cinematography: William A. Fraker
- Edited by: Lisa Zeno Churgin
- Music by: Christopher Young; Marty Stuart
- Distributed by: Miramax Films
- Release date: October 25, 2002
- Running time: 91 minutes
- Country: United States
- Language: English
- Box office: $267,109 (US)

Waking Up in Reno is a 2002 American road comedy-drama film directed by Jordan Brady and starring Billy Bob Thornton, Charlize Theron, Patrick Swayze, and Natasha Richardson. The screenplay by Brent Briscoe and Mark Fauser focuses on two redneck couples taking a road trip from Little Rock to Reno to see a monster truck rally.

== Plot ==
Lonnie Earl Dodd is a Little Rock car dealer who stars in his own cheesy television commercials. He and his wife Darlene are best friends with Roy and Candy Kirkendall, who are trying to start a family. When the two couples decide to drive cross-country to see a monster truck rally, Lonnie Earl pulls a new SUV off his lot and the four set off.

En route, they stop at an Amarillo, Texas restaurant where Lonnie Earl is determined to win a free dinner by consuming a 72-ounce steak and all the trimmings within an hour. Darlene longs to see the Grand Canyon, but Lonnie Earl insists they stick to their schedule and refuses to fulfill her dream. It becomes increasingly clear Darlene is living timidly in her husband's shadow, kowtowing to his demands and accepting his verbal and emotional abuse without complaint.

In Reno, a fortune teller tells Candy she is expecting a baby, and she buys several home pregnancy tests to see if she is right. She's overjoyed when all the results are positive, but complications arise when Roy calls Doc Tuley for the results of a fertility test he took before leaving home. Roy is told he's sterile, and therefore clearly not the father of Candy's child.

Darlene notices an uneasy glance between Lonnie Earl and Candy and realizes they have been having an affair. Devastated, she treats herself to a complete and expensive makeover and goes to see Tony Orlando perform, determined not to let her insensitive husband rob her of this dream as well. Meanwhile, Roy is in the hotel lounge trying to make headway with Brenda, who unbeknownst to him is a hooker.

Eventually, the two couples return to their suite where they engage in loud arguments and fisticuffs. The following day they discover Darlene has found the ultimate way to avenge her husband's boorish treatment of her - she has donated the SUV he intended to sell when they returned home to be destroyed by an enormous, fire-breathing Robosaurus during the monster truck rally.

In an epilogue we learn Roy and Candy are the parents of three children, the results of the fertility test having been incorrect. Lonnie Earl and a confident Darlene are equal partners in his business, and she has become the star of the still-cheesy ads he continues to make.

== Cast ==
- Billy Bob Thornton as Lonnie Earl Dodd
- Charlize Theron as Candy Kirkendall
- Patrick Swayze as Roy Kirkendall
- Natasha Richardson as Darlene Dodd
- Holmes Osborne as Doc Tuley
- Penélope Cruz as Brenda
- Rebecca Chace as the Nurse

Brad Pitt and Jennifer Aniston (then a couple) were attached to star but dropped out prior to filming. Thornton also co-produced the film.

== Critical reception ==
Roger Ebert of the Chicago Sun-Times rated the film 1½ stars, calling it "another one of those road comedies where Southern roots are supposed to make boring people seem colorful". He continued, "Well, they could be, if they had anything really at risk. But the film is way too gentle to back them into a corner. They're nice people whose problems are all solved with sitcom dialogue, and the profoundly traditional screenplay makes sure that love and family triumph in the end." Despite finding the characters to be "pleasant", and feeling that "in some grudging way we are happy that they're happy," he ultimately declared that "nothing in Waking Up in Reno ever inspired me to think of its inhabitants as anything more than markers in a screenplay."

Kevin Thomas of the Los Angeles Times observed, "The one thing that can be said of Waking Up in Reno is that it's rigorously consistent. Every note rings false, for writers Brent Briscoe and Mark Fauser have overlooked no stereotypes or clichés of small-town blue-collar speech, behavior, or tastes. Because they have not drawn from life but from a zillion other contemporary middle Americana movies and TV shows, their characters are so many times removed from reality that it is hard to blame director Jordan Brady for relentlessly condescending to their characters and plot. (This picture is way too heavy-handed to pass for satire.)"

Sean Axmaker of the Seattle Post-Intelligencer noted "the tepid script is neither satire nor farce, and the soap opera twists are far too tame to spark the material. With the low-gear direction by Jordan Brady, you might think he has some heavy hauling to do, but the teary confessions and screechy screaming bouts are all sound and no fury . . . This half-baked production sat on Miramax's shelf for a couple of years. It's no more done now than then, merely more stale."

Peter Travers of Rolling Stone wrote the film "offers big, fat, dumb laughs that may make you hate yourself for giving in. Ah, what the hell. The whole cast, directed by Jordan Brady with no restraint, is slumming . . . Thornton plays this low-ball farce with deceptive, masterful ease. Appreciate it."

Todd McCarthy of Variety called the film "a hillbilly romantic comedy in which the hillbillies show up but the romance and comedy never do" and "a real what-were-they-thinking effort." He added, "Given the complete lack of urgency and inspiration in the material, [the] filmmakers have tried to give their work a semblance of life by all manner of desperate means - animated maps, jumpy editing, jokey narration and slumber-arresting musical cues, to little avail."

== Box office ==
The film opened in 197 theaters in the United States and Canada on October 25, 2002. On its opening weekend, it grossed $108,930, an average of $552 per screen, and ranked #45 at the box office. It was pulled from release after four weeks.

== Home media ==
Miramax Home Entertainment released the Region 1 DVD on April 8, 2003. The film is in anamorphic widescreen format with audio tracks in English and French. Bonus features include commentary by director Jordan Brady and screenwriters Brent Briscoe and Mark Fauser, deleted scenes with optional commentary, and The Making of Waking Up in Reno.

In December 2010, Miramax was sold by The Walt Disney Company, their owners since 1993. That same month, the studio was taken over by private equity firm Filmyard Holdings. Filmyard licensed the home media rights for several Miramax titles to Echo Bridge Entertainment, and Echo Bridge reissued the film on DVD with new artwork on May 3, 2011. In 2011, Filmyard Holdings licensed the Miramax library to streaming site Netflix. This deal included Waking Up in Reno, and ran for five years, eventually ending on June 1, 2016.

In March 2016, Filmyard Holdings sold Miramax to Qatari company beIN Media Group. Then in April 2020, ViacomCBS (now known as Paramount Skydance) bought a 49% stake in Miramax, which gave them the rights to the Miramax library. Waking Up in Reno is among the 700 titles they acquired in the deal, and since April 2020, the film has been distributed by Paramount Pictures. On July 27, 2021, Paramount Home Entertainment reissued the film on DVD, with this being one of many Miramax titles that they reissued around this time. The reissue uses the same artwork as the 2003 release, and adds Paramount's mountain logo to the packaging like with all of their other Miramax reissues. Paramount later made the film available on their streaming service Paramount+.
