= Kathy Evison =

American actress

- Years active: 1992–2000
- Known for: Lonnie Henderson (seaQuest DSV)

Kathy Evison is an American former actress. She is best known for playing Lonnie Henderson in season 2-3 of seaQuest DSV.

== Biography ==
Evison's first television acting part was in The Heights in 1992 (in the episode "Natalie"), before she was cast in a regular role for the TV series seaQuest DSV in 1994.

One of Evison's guest appearances on Diagnosis: Murder, (the episode "Blood Ties"), was filmed as a pilot episode for a spin off series called Whistlers which would have starred her and Zoe McLellan. Ultimately the show wasn't picked up by the network.

== Selected filmography ==
- The Heights (TV) (1992) (episode: "Natalie") .... Natalie
- Beverly Hills, 90210 (TV) (3 episodes) (1994) .... Kathy Fisher
- seaQuest DSV (TV) (1994–96) .... Lieutenant JG Lonnie Henderson (main role)
- The New Adventures of Flipper (TV) (1996) (episode: "Sea Horse") .... Emma Phelps
- Highlander: The Series (1996) (TV) (episode: "Haunted") .... Jennifer Hill
- Diagnosis: Murder (TV) (3 episodes) (1996–99) .... Det. Amy Devlin
- The Pretender (TV) (episode: "Survival") (1999) .... Lt. Molly Kimbrell
- 7th Heaven (TV) (1999) (episode: "Yak Sada") .... Jessica Tanner
- Murder, She Wrote: A Story to Die For (TV movie) (2000) .... Penny Ryan
