= My Brother and Me =

American sitcom

- Genre: Slice of life Family sitcom
- Created by: Ilunga Adell; Calvin Brown, Jr.
- Written by: Ilunga Adell; Demetrius A. Bady; Bootsie; Calvin Brown, Jr.; Donelle Q. Buck; Bobby Crawford; Merrie Dudley; Angella Harris; Fred Johnson; J. Stanford Parker
- Directed by: Arlando Smith; Adam Weissman
- Starring: Arthur Reggie III; Ralph Woolfolk IV; Jimmy Lee Newman, Jr.; Aisling Sistrunk; Karen E. Fraction; Jim R. Coleman
- Country of origin: United States
- Original language: English
- No. of seasons: 1
- No. of episodes: 13

Production
- Executive producers: Calvin Brown, Jr.; Ilunga Adell; Bonnie Burns
- Production locations: Nickelodeon Studios, Orlando, Florida
- Camera setup: Multi-camera
- Running time: 24 minutes
- Production companies: Burns & Burns; Nickelodeon Productions

Original release
- Network: Nickelodeon
- Release: October 15, 1994 – February 2, 1995

My Brother and Me is an American sitcom that originally aired on Nickelodeon, created by Ilunga Adell and Calvin Brown Jr.

It premiered on October 15, 1994, replacing The Adventures of Pete & Pete at once, and ended on February 2, 1995, with a total of 13 episodes over the course of one season and production on the series wrapped in August 1994.

== Plot ==
The series is about the Parkers, a family living in the west side of Charlotte, North Carolina, who experience the highs and lows of everyday life. Jennifer and Roger Parker have two sons, Alfie and Dee Dee. Alfie is the cool elder brother and Dee Dee is the younger brother, who always follows Alfie around. The family also has a smarter, older daughter named Melanie. Another main character of the show is Alfie's best friend Milton 'Goo' Berry. Recurring characters who are friends with Dee Dee are Harry (the show's only white character) and Donnell. Melanie's best friend is Dionne, who is Donnell's older sister.

== Cast ==
=== Main ===
- Alfred "Alfie" Parker (Arthur Reggie III)
- Derek "Dee-Dee" Parker (Ralph Woolfolk IV)
- Milton "Goo" Berry (Jimmy Lee Newman, Jr.)
- Melanie Parker (Aisling Sistrunk)
- Jennifer Parker (Karen E. Fraction)
- Roger Parker (Jim R. Coleman)

=== Recurring ===
- Donnell Wilburn (Stefan J. Wernli)
- Deonne Wilburn (Amanda Seales)
- Harry White (Keith "Bubba" Naylor)
- Mrs. Pickney (Kym Whitley)
- Moo Berry (Willie Brunson)
- Aunt Helen (Florence Anthony)
- Janie (Vanessa Baden)
- Mrs. Wilburn (Avis Marie Barnes)

== Episodes ==
No.	Title	Directed by	Written by	Original release date	Prod. code
1	"The Quest for Kendall's Autograph"	Arlando Smith	Calvin Brown Jr.	October 15, 1994	104
Alfie and Dee Dee leave the bazaar to get an autograph; guest Seattle Supersonic Kendall Gill.
2	"The Joke's On You"	Adam Weissman	Demetrius A. Bady & Calvin Brown, Jr.	October 22, 1994	112
Practical jokes are played while Jennifer has entered the family into the Queen City Magazine "family of the year" contest.
3	"Sensitive Goo"	Adam Weissman	Donnelle Buck & Merrie Dudley	January 1, 1995	111
A hit to the head causes Goo to change his personality.
4	"Real Men Don't Wear Tights"	Arlando Smith	Bobby Crawford & Fred Johnson	November 1, 1994	109
Alfie protests on wearing tights for the Robin Hood school play, but later he quits.
5	"Hit the Open Man"	Arlando Smith	J. Stanford Parker	November 30, 1994	108
At basketball tryouts, Alfie and Goo try out for the seniors. Dee Dee, Harry, and Donnell try out for the junior team; guest Dennis Scott of the Orlando Magic.
6	"A Stranger Among Us"	Susan Dansby	Fred Johnson	December 6, 1994	103
The brothers trade for Goo's pet ball python snake while Melanie and Deonne bring home the class rabbit mascot.
7	"Partners"	Adam Weissman	Donnelle Buck	December 15, 1994	101
A girl named Janaya admires Dee Dee during Science class.
8	"The Haircut"	Adam Weissman	Ilunga Adell & Calvin Brown, Jr.	December 20, 1994	113
Goo gives Dee Dee a bad haircut from Goo, after his parents didn't allow him to get one at a barbershop.
9	"Nobody's Baby"	Arlando Smith	Donnelle Buck	December 28, 1994	105
Dee Dee finds himself in several situations with his family that leave him feeling unwanted. He backs out from going to a monster truck show, then gets angry and decides to run away.
10	"Dance"	Adam Weissman	Ilunga Adell	January 5, 1995	102
Alfie teaches Dee Dee and Harry to dance during Donnell's birthday party.
11	"The Surprise"	Arlando Smith	Ilunga Adell & Angela Harris	January 19, 1995	110
Goo and Melanie false date against Alfie while they plan to throw a surprise party.
12	"The Candy Sale"	Arlando Smith	Demetrius A. Bady & Calvin Brown, Jr.	January 26, 1995	107
Alfie and Goo sell candy bars in order to buy new jackets with the help of Goo's uncle.
13	"The Big Bully"	Arlando Smith	Fred Johnson	February 2, 1995	106
Alfie and Goo help Dee Dee stand up to a bully named Big Lou.

== Cancellation ==
The show was Nickelodeon's first series featuring a predominantly black cast and ran for 13 episodes. In a 2007 interview, Ralph Woolfolk IV, who played Dee Dee, stated that the show was canceled due to disagreements between the producers and creators of the show; the two parties had different visions for the show, which caused a major fallout.

== Home media ==
"My Brother and Me: The Complete Series" was released on June 23, 2014, exclusively on Amazon.com in region 1. This release contains two discs. It is published on demand and manufacture on demand (MOD) onto DVD-Rs. All My Brother and Me episodes can be found on iTunes.

== Awards and nominations ==
In 1996 and 1997, My Brother and Me was nominated for the NAACP Image Award (Outstanding Youth or Children's Series/Special).

== See also ==
- Kenan & Kel
- Cousin Skeeter
- Romeo!
- Just Jordan
