= SeaQuest DSV =

American television series (1993–1996)

seaQuest DSV
- The seaQuest DSV main title
- Genre: Science fiction
- Created by: Rockne S. O'Bannon
- Starring: Roy Scheider; Jonathan Brandis; Stephanie Beacham; Don Franklin; Michael Ironside
- Composers: John Debney (Season 1); Don Davis (Seasons 1 & 2); Russ Mitchell Landau (Seasons 2 & 3)
- Country of origin: United States
- Original language: English
- No. of seasons: 3
- No. of episodes: 57 (list of episodes)

Production
- Executive producers: Rockne S. O'Bannon; David J. Burke; Steven Spielberg; Patrick Hasburgh; Clifton Campbell; Tommy Thompson; Robert Engels
- Producers: Steve Beers; Gregg Fienberg; Oscar L. Costo
- Running time: 45 minutes per episode
- Production companies: Amblin Television; Universal Television

Original release
- Network: NBC
- Release: September 12, 1993 – June 9, 1996

SeaQuest DSV (stylized as seaQuest DSV and also promoted as simply seaQuest) is an American science fiction television series created by Rockne S. O'Bannon that originally aired on NBC from 1993 to 1996. The show centers on the crew of the high-tech deep-submergence vehicle seaQuest DSV, a submarine operated by the United Earth Oceans Organization (UEO), as they explore the ocean depths, protect underwater colonies, and navigate geopolitical tensions in a near-future world where humanity has colonized the seas due to depleted land resources. Set initially in 2018 and shifting to 2032 by its third season (when the title changed to seaQuest 2032), it originally mixed high drama with realistic scientific fiction.

The series follows Captain Nathan Bridger (played by Roy Scheider), a reluctant naval officer recruited to command the seaQuest, alongside Lucas Wolenczak (played by Jonathan Brandis), a teenaged computer genius placed aboard seaQuest by his father. Supporting characters include Commander Jonathan Ford (played by Don Franklin), the ship's executive officer; Kristin Westphalen (played by Stephanie Beacham), the chief medical officer and head of the science department; and Lieutenant Commander Katherine Hitchcock (played by Stacy Haiduk), the chief engineer. In the opening episode of the third season Bridger departed seaQuest and was replaced by Captain Oliver Hudson (played by Michael Ironside). Also present was a dolphin character called Darwin who, due to technological advances, was able to communicate with the crew.

Produced by Amblin Entertainment under Universal Television, seaQuest DSV featured Steven Spielberg as one of the show's executive producers during the first two seasons. Production of the first season was marked by disputes between the producers, NBC and cast members, changes in the production staff, and an earthquake. The second season saw changes in the cast, as well as continued disputes between cast members and producers. The third season introduced a new lead actor and title. While initially popular, the series began to decline in ratings throughout its run and was abruptly canceled in the middle of its third season.

"The twenty-first century. Mankind has colonized the last unexplored region on earth, the ocean. As captain of the seaQuest and its crew, we are its guardians. For beneath the surface lies the future."

— Opening Narration

== Overview ==
=== Season 1 ===
The first-season cast

The series follows the adventures of the high-tech submarine seaQuest DSV 4600, a deep-submergence vehicle operated by the United Earth Oceans Organization (UEO), a global coalition of up-world countries and undersea confederations, similar to the United Nations.

The storyline begins in 2018, when mankind has exhausted almost all natural resources, except for on the ocean floor, where human colonies have been established. The UEO was created after a recent showdown of nations and confederations at the Livingston Trench in the North Atlantic Ocean. The showdown was depicted in the pilot episode, "To Be Or Not to Be", and remained a recurring element for the duration of the series.

The seaQuest was designed by retired naval captain Nathan Bridger for NORPAC, a military organization mentioned in the pilot, which loans the vessel to the UEO. Bridger is asked to take command of the vessel, and after initial reluctance—he had promised his now-dead wife not to rejoin the Navy after their son was killed in naval combat—agrees.

The mission of seaQuest, Bridger, and the crew is to protect seafloor colonies from hostile nonaligned nations, to mediate disputes, and to perform undersea research, much of which was still in the preliminary stages when the show began production in 1993. The first season's storylines primarily dealt with plausible oceanographic research, environmental issues, political machinations of the world and the interpersonal relationships of the crew.

=== Season 2 ===
The season two cast

In the first-season finale, Bridger sacrifices the seaQuest to prevent an ecological disaster and for a short time it was not known if the show would be renewed for another season. The series had struggled in the ratings against Murder, She Wrote on CBS and Lois and Clark: The New Adventures of Superman on ABC. But NBC had guaranteed Steven Spielberg two seasons in a deal like the one he had secured for his 1985 series Amazing Stories.

Before the second season, NBC and Universal made changes to the show's format, cast, and production location. They moved the show's production from Los Angeles to Orlando. NBC fired Royce D. Applegate (Chief Petty Officer Manilow Crocker) and John D'Aquino (Krieg) because the network wanted a younger cast for the second season. D'Aquino returned for a guest appearance in the third season. Stacy Haiduk (Hitchcock) told producers that she did not wish to move to Orlando for the second season, having just returned to Los Angeles after spending four years in Florida during the production of The Adventures of Superboy. Stephanie Beacham (Westphalen) was also hesitant to move to Florida. Beacham also blamed continued disputes between the network and the show's producers as a major reason why she did not return.

Joining the series for season two were Edward Kerr as Lieutenant James Brody, seaQuest's weapons officer; Kathy Evison as Lieutenant Lonnie Henderson, ship's helmsman; Rosalind Allen as Dr. Wendy Smith, the boat's new chief medical officer; Michael DeLuise as Seaman Anthony Piccolo, an ex-convict who has genetically engineered gills; and Peter DeLuise as Dagwood, a prototype genetically engineered life form (G.E.L.F. or "dagger"—a racial slur) who serves as seaQuest's custodian. As the seaQuest was rebuilt in the storyline, it allowed the sets to be redesigned for the new Florida location. A shortened version of the Emmy-winning main title theme was created. The series returned to the airwaves on September 18, 1994, with the two-hour television movie season premiere, "Daggers".

NBC and the show's producers decided they wanted more traditionally science-fiction oriented episodes, a direction that was explored toward the end of the first season in the episode "Such Great Patience", in which seaQuest discovers a million-year-old alien ship entombed in the ocean floor. The second season explored as genetic engineering, aliens, parapsychology, time travel and various "monsters of the week", including killer plants, a giant fire-breathing worm, a prehistoric crocodile and an ancient demon.

Roy Scheider was vocal in his anger at the show's new direction. In an interview given during the second season, Scheider averred: "It's childish trash...I am very bitter about it. I feel betrayed...It's [the new season] not even good fantasy. I mean, Star Trek does this stuff much better than we can do it. To me the show is now 21 Jump Street meets Star Dreck." Scheider felt the series had strayed too far away from its premise, and that he "became more of a combat commander than a scientific commander and I hadn't signed up for that."

Scheider added that producers had indicated that after moving production to Florida, the show was "going to present human beings who had a life on land as well as on the boat." Instead, he said, "we've had one script that has done that," the episode "Vapors". "The other shows are Saturday afternoon 4 o'clock junk for children. Just junk—old, tired, time-warp robot crap," alluding to the much-maligned episode "Playtime."

As Scheider explained, "I don't do this kind of stuff... I said [to the production executives], 'If I wanted to do the fourth generation of Star Trek, I would have signed up for it. I wouldn't have done seaQuest. You guys have changed it from handball into field hockey and never even bothered to talk to me.'" Scheider's comments left him in trouble with some of the executive producers, including Patrick Hasburgh, who, in reply, had strong words for Scheider as well: "I'm sorry he is such a sad and angry man. seaQuest is going to be a terrific show, and he is lucky to be part of it."

By the end of season two, seaQuest DSV was again suffering, partly attributed to a perceived decrease in the quality of the writing and by preemptions by NBC for sports coverage. The possibility of cancellation appeared likely but NBC kept the show in production after the cancellation of plans for a new series, Rolling Thunder, to replace seaQuest DSV. Producer Lee Goldberg claimed the new series was canceled because the premise was "awful." The season finale, written as a possible series finale, involved the seaQuest and its crew being abducted by aliens and forced into a civil war on an alien world where the ship appeared to be destroyed and the crew presumed dead.

=== Season 3 ===
The world is not a nice place, it's not comfortable...corporate entities have grown to the point where they rival and sometimes are more powerful than actual national governments. UEO is not the big kid on the block anymore, seaQuest is no longer state of the art; it's a boat and it's a military vehicle and I'm going to take it places it has never been before

— Michael Ironside, in an interview promoting season three

Blaming continued disputes with producers and abandonment of the show's original premise, Roy Scheider requested to be released from his contract with NBC. However, the network only partially agreed and demanded that Bridger would make several appearances throughout the third season. Edward Kerr had been very frustrated with the episode entitled "Alone" (Reportedly, Kerr hated the script so much that he left the set. Brody is absent from that episode) and also wished to exit the series in the third season, which is why his character was critically injured in the season finale, "Splashdown".

NBC would only agree to release him from his contract if he continued to play Brody for a few episodes in the third season so his character could be killed off for more dramatic impact in the episode "SpinDrift". Because of rescheduling, the episode "Brainlock", with Brody still alive, aired after the character's death. Rosalind Allen was released; her character Dr. Smith proved to be unpopular with the audience and because producers felt that her character's telepathic abilities would not fit with the more serious tone planned for the new season.

Marco Sanchez (Chief Petty Officer Miguel Ortiz), who had requested to remain with the series, was also released after NBC decided it wanted the principal cast number dropped from ten to nine, leaving Jonathan Brandis (Lucas Wolenczak), Don Franklin (Commander Jonathan Ford), and Ted Raimi (Lieutenant Tim O'Neill) as the only three cast members who remained with the show since the first episode. The marine trivia presentations at the end of the show, formerly hosted by oceanographer Dr. Bob Ballard in season one and the main cast excluding Scheider in season two, were dropped entirely. The show itself was renamed seaQuest 2032, with the storyline pushed ahead ten years after the end of season two.

The season three cast

In the season premiere, the seaQuest reappears on Earth, its crew mostly intact, ten years after their abduction at the end of season two. Captain Bridger retires to raise his new grandson and Michael Ironside joins the cast as the more militaristic Captain Oliver Hudson. Originally, Ironside refused to take over from Scheider as star of the series. "I saw so many problems that I couldn't see where I'd be able to do the work I wanted to do." claimed Ironside. Also considered for the lead of the series was actor Jonathan Banks, who had previously appeared in the first-season episode "Whale Songs" as radical environmentalist Maximilian Scully.

After weeks of negotiations where Ironside offered producers a number of changes to the storytelling structure of the series, which were agreed upon, he finally signed on. "You won't see me fighting any man-eating glowworms, rubber plants, 40-foot crocodiles and I don't talk to Darwin." he said. Though not cast as the new lead of the series, Jonathan Banks reprised his character of Scully in the third season. Also joining the cast was Elise Neal as Lieutenant J.J. Fredericks, who served as seaQuest's sub-fighter pilot.

Steering story lines back towards more reality-based themes, the third season attempted to blend the sense of the first season with some of the unique elements of the second season, while at the same time, pushing forward in an entirely new direction altogether as the UEO faces the threat of the Macronesian Alliance and the ever growing corporate conglomerate Deon International. The series was perceived as becoming much darker than it was in the previous two seasons, focusing less on science (as it had in the first season) and science fiction (as it had in the second season) and more on international politics. While these changes were met with mostly positive reactions, ratings continued to decline and NBC canceled the series after thirteen episodes. The 57th and final network airing of seaQuest 2032 took place on June 9, 1996.

== Cast ==
=== Main ===
==== Season 1 ====
- Roy Scheider as Captain Nathan Bridger (47 episodes)
- Jonathan Brandis as Lucas Wolenczak (57 episodes)
- Stephanie Beacham as Dr. Kristin Westphalen (22 episodes)
- Stacy Haiduk as Lieutenant Commander Katherine Hitchcock (23 episodes)
- Don Franklin as Commander Jonathan Ford (56 episodes)
- John D'Aquino as Lieutenant Benjamin Krieg (22 episodes)
- Royce D. Applegate as CPO Manilow Crocker (22 episodes)
- Ted Raimi as Lieutenant Tim O'Neill (54 episodes)
- Marco Sanchez as CPO Miguel Ortiz (40 episodes)
- Frank Welker as voice of Darwin
- Dr. Bob Ballard as himself, marine trivia during credits

==== Season 2 ====
- Rosalind Allen as Dr. Wendy Smith (19 episodes)
- Edward Kerr as Lieutenant James Brody (26 episodes)
- Michael DeLuise as Seaman Anthony Piccolo (33 episodes)
- Kathy Evison as Lieutenant Lonnie Henderson (32 episodes)
- Peter DeLuise as Dagwood (31 episodes)

==== Season 3 ====
- Michael Ironside as Captain Oliver Hudson (13 episodes)
- Elise Neal as Lieutenant J.J. Fredericks (10 episodes)

=== Recurring ===
- Shelley Hack as Captain Marilyn Stark
- Richard Herd as Admiral/Secretary General William Noyce
- W. Morgan Sheppard as "The Old Man", Professor Martinson
- Dustin Nguyen as CPO William Shan
- Jesse Doran as General Francis Gideon Thomas
- Kent McCord as Commander Scott Keller
- Robert Engels as Malcolm Lansdowne
- Mark Fauser as Weapons Officer Dalton Phillips
- Timothy Omundson as Dr. Joshua Levin
- Dan Hildebrand as Helmsman Carleton
- Roscoe Lee Browne as Dr. Raleigh Young
- Sarah Koskoff as Julianna
- Denis Arndt as Navy Quartermaster Bickle
- James Shigeta as Montegnard Confederation President Chi
- Jonathan Banks as Maximilian Scully
- Michael Costello as Secretary General McGath
- Sam Jenkins as Mariah
- Mark Hamill as Tobias LeConte
- Karen Fraction as Dr. Perry
- Michael York as President Alexander Bourne of Macronesia
- Andrew Stahl as General Stassi
- Tim DeKay as Larry Deon
- Ralph Wilcox as Mason Freeman
- Patricia Charbonneau as Elaine Morse

== Episodes ==
Season	Episodes	Originally released	
Season	Episodes	First released	Last released
1	23	September 12, 1993	May 22, 1994
2	21	September 18, 1994	September 13, 1995
3	13	September 20, 1995	June 9, 1996

During the first and second seasons, NBC aired the show on Sundays at 8:00 p.m. Eastern Time; however, the series was frequently preempted in the second season in favor of NBC Sports coverage. During the third season, NBC moved the show to Wednesdays at 8:00 p.m. ET; seaQuest continued to face frequent preemptions in favor of sports coverage and other television specials. Several of the show's producers, including Carleton Eastlake, believe these preemptions led to the show's cancellation.

After cancellation, the series aired on the Sci-Fi Channel in the United States, Horror Channel in the UK, Space: The Imagination Station in Canada and Network Ten in Australia.

== Production ==
In October 1992, it was announced NBC had given a 22-episode order to Sea Quest which was co-created by Rockne S. O'Bannon and Steven Spielberg. The budget for the first season was estimated to be around $30 million with Universal Television's televisions ambitions for the series being to serve as part of a larger multimedia franchise Spielberg had been friends with Roy Scheider since he starred in Jaws and was instrumental in getting him as the lead in the series with Scheider saying of the experience "It's the best part offered me this year. If it gets to be half as good as it reads — it will be wonderful. It's time for a show like this on TV."

During development, the original title for the series was Deep Space, though this was changed after the announcement of Star Trek: Deep Space Nine.

Roy Scheider's character was based on John C. Lilly and Bob Ballard, who was also the technical advisor for the series in the first season. Lilly was a pioneer researcher into the nature of consciousness using as his principal tools the isolation tank, dolphin communication and psychedelic drugs, sometimes in combination. He was a prominent member of the Californian counterculture of scientists, mystics and thinkers that arose in the late 1960s and early 1970s. Albert Hofmann, Gregory Bateson, Ram Dass, Timothy Leary, Werner Erhard, and Richard Feynman were all frequent visitors to his home. The character's name, Nathan Hale Bridger, was in homage to Nathan Hale.

When producers began developing new characters for the second season, they named Lieutenant Brody after Police Chief Martin Brody, Roy Scheider's character in the first two Jaws films. Ralph Willcox and Karen Fraction, who both became recurring guest stars in the third season, had previously appeared as different characters in the second. Despite the numerous cast changes, Jonathan Brandis appeared in every episode of the series, Don Franklin in all but one episode ("And Everything Nice"), and Ted Raimi in all but two episodes ("Nothing But The Truth" and "The Siamese Dream").

Several of the cast's family members were brought in to play characters, as well. Brenda King, Roy Scheider's wife, portrayed Carol Bridger; Todd Allen, Rosalind Allen's husband, portrayed Clay Marshall in "The Siamese Dream"; Michael and Peter DeLuise's father, veteran actor Dom DeLuise, portrayed Nick Piccolo in "Vapors". Several cast members also dabbled on the creative side of the show, as both Ted Raimi and Jonathan Brandis penned episodes during the second season. (Brandis wrote the aforementioned "The Siamese Dream" and Raimi, "Lostland".) Conversely, Robert Engels, one of the show's executive producers (and writer of two episodes, "Greed For a Pirate's Dream" and "Hide and Seek") during the first season, portrayed the recurring character Malcolm Lansdowne.

While in production, seaQuest DSV won and was nominated for a number of awards. John Debney won the 1994 Emmy for "Outstanding Individual Achievement in Main Title Theme Music" for his composition of the seaQuest DSV theme song and in 2000, it was named the 48th best theme song of all time by TV Guide. Don Davis also won an Emmy in 1995 for "Outstanding Individual Achievement in Music Composition for a Series" (Dramatic Underscore) for his score for the second-season premiere, "Daggers". Russ Mitchell Landau was also nominated for his work on the third-season premiere, "Brave New World", in 1996. Kenneth D. Zunder was nominated for the Emmy award for "Outstanding Individual Achievement in Cinematography for a Series" for the episode "Such Great Patience". Jonathan Brandis won the 1994 Young Artist Award for "Best Youth Actor Leading Role in a Television Series" for his portrayal of Lucas Wolenczak and the series was nominated for a 1994 ASC Award for "Outstanding Achievement in Cinematography in Movies of the Week/Pilots" as well as the Saturn Award for "Best Genre Television Series" in 1995.

A seaQuest DSV feature film was in pre-production stages, however, it never materialized.

Despite being scripted in at least one episode, Captain Bridger never refers to Dagwood by name. The closest he ever got was calling him "Dag" in the episodes "Special Delivery" and "The Siamese Dream".

Despite popular belief, Darwin was not a real dolphin but rather an animatronic animal designed and created by Walt Conti, who had created other similar effects for films such as Star Trek IV: The Voyage Home, The Abyss and Free Willy. Alien creature effects were designed and created by Tony Gardner's Alterian, Inc.

== Home media ==
Title	Ep #	DVD release date					
Title	Ep #	Region 1	Discs	Region 2	Discs	Region 4	Discs
Season One	23	December 26, 2005	4	November 20, 2006	6	December 5, 2006	6
Season Two	21	January 1, 2008	8	March 31, 2008	8	August 20, 2008	8
Season Three	13	TBA	TBA	TBA	TBA	October 5, 2011	4

In 2005, Universal announced that the first season of seaQuest DSV would be released on Region 1 DVD along with a week-long marathon of the show on the Sci Fi Channel. The DVD release included never before seen deleted scenes on selected episodes. The second season was released in 2008 in region 1. As opposed to the first season, the second season was released on eight single-sided discs and does not contain any extra features such as deleted scenes. The third season was not released on DVD in region 1 but was released in Region 4 in 2011.

On December 12, 2015, the Australian DVD label ViaVision, through its distributor Madman Distribution, released season 1 on Blu-ray in full 1080p High definition. Although presented in 1080p, the program is presented Pillarboxed to maintain the original 4:3 aspect ratio. Season 2 was released on Blu-ray on March 2, 2016. On April 15, 2020, selected episodes were made available on the early preview of the streaming service Peacock, available to Xfinity subscribers with qualifying devices.

On May 6, 2019, Mediumrare Entertainment released the complete series on DVD in Region 2 however two episodes are missing, 'Dagger Redux' and 'The Siamese Dream' instead two episodes from the previous disc are overlapped in their place. Despite this, the correct episode titles are listed in the DVD menu.

Mill Creek Entertainment announced the complete series of SeaQuest DSV on Blu-ray was released on July 19, 2022.

== Merchandise ==
- A short series of novels based on the characters and concepts depicted on seaQuest DSV were available during the first season of the show. They were:
  - seaQuest DSV: The Novel (a novelization of the pilot episode) by Diane Duane and Peter Morwood. Published October 1993. ISBN 978-0-441-00037-1
  - seaQuest DSV: Fire Below by Matthew J. Costello. Published January 1994. ISBN 0-441-00039-8
  - seaQuest DSV: The Ancient by David Bischoff. Published March 1994. ISBN 0-441-00042-8
- Nemesis Comics published one issue of a seaQuest DSV comic book in March 1994. It contained a 23-page original story titled Deep Faith, blueprints for the Renegade submarine and for the seaQuest bridge, and two one-page "Logbook" character bios for Captain Bridger and Dr. Westphalen. The cover for the planned second issue was included on the final page of Issue #1, but it was ultimately never published.
- A video game was released for the Super NES, Game Boy, and Genesis consoles in 1994.
- A series of action figures designed by Playmates Toys were released in 1993. Captain Bridger, Commander Ford, Lucas Wolenczak, Lt. Commander Hitchcock, Lieutenant O'Neill, Chief Crocker, Darwin, Dr. Rubin Zellar, and The Regulator were released as part of wave one. Additional characters such as Dr. Westphalen, Chief Ortiz, and Lieutenant Krieg and a Darwin with sound effects were planned as part of wave two, but they were never released. Additionally, prototypes of the seaQuest, the Delta 4 Pirate sub, the Stinger, a seaLaunch, and a Deep Sea Mini Pickup, all with electronic lights and sounds, are known to exist but were not released.
- A series of trading cards produced by SkyBox were released in 1993, depicting characters, scenes, and episodes from the first season. It consisted of 100 standard trading cards, plus four foil chase cards and two promotional cards.
- Various models were produced by Monogram, including the seaQuest, a Deep Sea Mini Pickup, The Stinger, and Darwin (actually a remolded Flipper) were released.
- Various pieces of clothing, including T-shirts, baseball caps, and embroidered patches of the seaQuest and UEO logos (replicas of the ones used on the show) were released.
- A non-fictional large format book was released in the UK during the first season, titled seaQuest DSV: The Official Publication of the Series. It contained comprehensive interviews and production information, artwork, and design histories, as well as a production report of the episode "Hide and Seek". (Published October 1994. ISBN 0-752-20978-7)

Other merchandise made available included a shot glass in cobalt blue with gold logo, key chains and pins, a book cover, 'magic rocks' sets, journal, and a set of bookmarks.

=== Soundtrack album ===
seaQuest DSV

Soundtrack album by John Debney
- Released: 1995 (initial release), 2020 (Deluxe Edition)
- Recorded: Universal City Studios, Stage 10
- Genre: Soundtrack
- Length: 29:46 (original release); 131:28 (Deluxe Edition)
- Label: Varèse Sarabande
- Producers: John Debney; Philip Neel

John Debney composed the original theme music and scored the pilot and season one shows, with Don Davis working on season two. When the series was revamped as SeaQuest 2032 in the final season, Russ Landau composed a new theme and scored all the episodes. In 1995, Varèse Sarabande released an album of Debney's music from the show, featuring the series main and end title themes and selections from "To Be or Not to Be" (tracks 2–8), "Knight of Shadows" (tracks 9 and 10) and "Such Great Patience" (tracks 11–13). In 2020, the label released a 2-CD expansion, with music from "To Be or Not to Be" on disc 1. Disc 2 contained music from the season one episodes “Brothers And Sisters” (tracks 1–7), “Knight Of Shadows” (8–11), “The Regulator” (12–14), “The Good Death” (15–23), “Such Great Patience” (24–31) and “The Devil's Window” (track 32).

==== 1995 album ====
1. Main Title (1:03)
2. Preparing for Battle (2:51)
3. Bridger's Dream (:52)
4. Uncharted Waters (2:06)
5. First Engagement (3:18)
6. Darwin Speaks (:58)
7. Dangerous Adversary (1:34)
8. To Adventures Bold (1:31)
9. Waltz With the Dead (2:48)
10. The Forgiving/Resurrection (4:53)
11. The Discovery (2:15)
12. Lucas Meets the Alien (2:30)
13. Solemn Oath (2:26)
14. End Credits (:37)

==== 2020 Deluxe Edition ====
CD 1: "To Be or Not to Be"

1. SeaQuest Opening Credits (3:29)
2. SeaQuest Arrives (4:01)
3. Military Welcome (:37)
4. To The Island (1:30)
5. Come See Her (1:38)
6. seaQuest (3:32)
7. Playon To SeaQuest (:37)
8. Hitchcock Retreats (1:50)
9. Darwin Speaks (:59)
10. Stark Prepares (1:02)
11. Act In To SeaQuest (:46)
12. Transition (:34)
13. Attack Formation (2:48)
14. At The Precipice / Into The Rift (7:48)
15. Stark Plots (:42)
16. Damage Assessment (:52)
17. Hyper-Probe (2:05)
18. Impending Battle / Play On (1:51)
19. Bridger Returns (2:42)
20. Battle Stations (2:50)
21. Caught (1:21)
22. To The Bottom Of The Sea / A Tag To Bonnie The Bad Girl (6:57)
23. To The Ocean (4:15)
24. SeaQuest: End Credits (:57)
25. SeaQuest Opening (alternate version with Choir mixed down) (1:45)
26. SeaQuest (alternate version) (1:36)

CD 2: Season One Highlights

1. SeaQuest Series Promo (2:33)
2. Of Treasures In The Deep (1:14)
3. The Discovery (1:41)
4. Mind Meld #2 (1:23)
5. Big Tension (3:38)
6. Exploring The Depot (1:30)
7. Saying Goodbye (2:40)
8. Into The Ghost Ship (1:43)
9. The Possession Of Kristini (2:47)
10. Lukas Confronts Captain (3:14)
11. The Forgiving (4:51)
12. Vern Leaves (2:09)
13. Monkey Fish (1:42)
14. Inside Us All (:56)
15. Attacked (1:12)
16. Cynthia (1:20)
17. Drug Store (1:38)
18. Narrow Escape (1:57)
19. The Plan (1:41)
20. Close Call (3:31)
21. The Escape (4:21)
22. Darwin Save Malik (1:03)
23. Cheo Checkmate (1:08)
24. Discovery (2:14)
25. Of Gods And Astronauts (2:28)
26. Encounter (1:44)
27. Wolf In The Fold (1:37)
28. Intruder (4:28)
29. Communication (2:29)
30. Understanding/Possible Pickup (4:31)
31. Invitation Extended (2:26)
32. SeaQuest: End Credits (:35)

== See also ==
- List of underwater science fiction works
