= Pinocchio's Revenge =

1996 American horror film

- Video box art
- Directed by: Kevin S. Tenney
- Screenplay by: Kevin S. Tenney
- Produced by: Jeff Geoffray; Walter Josten
- Starring: Rosalind Allen; Todd Allen; Aaron Lustig; Ron Canada; Candace McKenzie; Lewis Van Bergen; Larry Cedar; Brittany Alyse Smith
- Cinematography: Eric Anderson
- Edited by: Daniel Duncan
- Music by: Dennis Michael Tenney
- Production company: Trimark Pictures
- Distributed by: Trimark Pictures; Blue Rider Productions
- Release date: October 7, 1996
- Running time: 96 minutes
- Country: United States
- Language: English

Pinocchio's Revenge is a 1996 American horror film written and directed by Kevin S. Tenney and distributed by Trimark Pictures. It stars Rosalind Allen and Todd Allen and was released direct-to-video. The film's plot concerns a lawyer who brings home a wooden puppet that was found buried with a boy supposedly killed by his father. Her 8-year-old daughter Zoe sees the doll and takes it as her own. Soon accidents start happening and Jennifer struggles to find the cause as she begins to question her daughter's wellbeing and whether or not there may be something sinister to the doll. The movie is closer "to Don Mancini's original intent for Child's Play".

The film was conceptualized as Bad Pinocchio, written as The Pinocchio Syndrome, shot as Pinocchio, and released as Pinocchio's Revenge on VHS and Laserdisc on 23 September 1997.

== Plot ==
Despite overwhelming evidence, Jennifer Garrick, the lawyer defending convicted child murderer Vincent Gotto, believes her client is not guilty and is hiding the identity of the real killer. A fellow attorney in Jennifer's office explains the presence of a large Pinocchio-type puppet sitting in her chair, previously buried by Gotto in his son's grave, as belatedly delivered evidence which she had earlier requisitioned. Intending to examine the puppet in the hope of finding a clue which might prevent Gotto's execution, Jennifer brings it home and her emotionally fragile daughter Zoe mistakes it for a birthday gift.

Zoe develops a relationship with the Pinocchio puppet and becomes unbalanced to an even greater degree. Trouble begins when Zoe's bully at school is pushed in front of a bus, which Zoe blames on Pinocchio trying to protect her. Soon after, Jennifer's boyfriend David Kaminsky is knocked down the basement stairs while babysitting Zoe, but is saved when she calls 9-1-1. Later, Zoe is at one of her therapy sessions when her psychiatrist, Dr. Edwards, has to leave the room. Zoe begins talking with Pinocchio about who is to blame for David's accident, with each placing blame on the other. Jennifer and Dr. Edwards watch the argument through a video feed, seeing that Zoe is talking to herself.

That night, Pinocchio convinces Zoe to set him free on the pretense that he will confess to David about causing his accident. Zoe makes him promise he will not do anything bad and cuts his strings, at which point Pinocchio takes off for the hospital with Zoe in pursuit. Through a first-person perspective, an unknown person walks into David's room and unplugs his life support machine, killing him. When Zoe denies to Jennifer that she visited the hospital and blames David's death on Pinocchio, an angry and confused Jennifer locks the puppet in the trunk of her car.

That night, Zoe is left in the care of babysitter Sophia, who reminds Zoe that she gave Pinocchio a conscience in the form of a cricket she caught earlier. Zoe runs to her room to check on the cricket, only to find it killed. Sophia runs to the sound of Zoe's screams, only to be attacked and killed by someone wielding a fireplace poker. Jennifer arrives home to find the babysitter dead and Zoe standing in a dark hallway. When she tries to confront Zoe, the girl runs away in a panic. As Jennifer explores the house, she is struck by the poker and sees her daughter standing above her with it in her hand.

Zoe explains that she just managed to get the poker away from Pinocchio, but before Jennifer can inquire further, she vanishes. Jennifer stands up to see Pinocchio standing in the room, at which point he suddenly turns towards her and attacks her with a knife. Following a pursuit through the house, Jennifer throws Pinocchio through a glass coffee table, only to see that her daughter is suddenly lying in the puppet's place. The movie closes with a catatonic Zoe being committed. Jennifer vows not to give up until Zoe recovers and comes home, to which Dr. Edwards states, "I hope not, for your sake, I hope not."

== Cast ==
- Rosalind Allen as Jennifer Garrick
- Brittany Alyse Smith as Zoe Garrick
- Aaron Lustig as Dr. Bert Edwards
- Todd Allen as David Kaminsky
- Candace McKenzie as Sophia
- Ron Canada as Barry
- Larry Cedar as District Attorney
- Lewis Van Bergen as Vincent Gotto
- Janet MacLachlan as Judge Allen
- Sal Viscuso and Ed Bernard as Jail Guards
- Dick Beals as The Voice of Pinocchio
  - Verne Troyer as Pinocchio Double

== Legacy ==
In 2026, another attempt to portray Pinocchio as a killer was made with the production of Pinocchio Unstrung. The film reportedly features similarities to the former, such as a scene in which Pinocchio watches a woman in the shower and a scene at a hospital in which he kills a patient.

== See also ==
- Killer toys
- Pinocchio Unstrung
