= The Right to Remain Silent =

- VHS cover
- Based on: The RIght to Remain Silent by Brent Briscoe; Mark Fauser
- Written by: Mark Fauser; Brent Briscoe
- Directed by: Hubert C. de la Bouillerie
- Starring: Lea Thompson; LL Cool J Patrick Dempsey; Christopher Lloyd; Amanda Plummer; Carl Reiner; Judge Reinhold; Laura San Giacomo; Fisher Stevens; Robert Loggia
- Music by: Randy Miller
- Country of origin: United States
- Original language: English

Production
- Producers: Thom Colwell; Donna Dubrow; John McTiernan; Debbie Robins
- Cinematography: Greg Gardiner
- Editor: Mike Murphy
- Running time: 97 minutes
- Production companies: Chanticleer Films; Tongue River

Original release
- Network: Showtime
- Release: January 7, 1996

The Right to Remain Silent is a play by Mark Fauser and Brent Briscoe that was adapted for a television film in 1996 starring Robert Loggia and Lea Thompson.

== Synopsis ==
It was supposed to be just a normal night at the police station for rookie cop Christine Paley. She has to deal with and report on about eight different types of arrests which can happen in a normal month. Lt. Mike Brosloe leads her through one of the most unusual first shifts.

== Main cast ==
- Robert Loggia as Mike Brosloe
- Lea Thompson as Christine Paley
- LL Cool J as Charles Red Taylor
- Amanda Plummer as Paulina Marcos
- Christopher Lloyd as Johnny Benjamin
- Laura San Giacomo as Nicole Savita
- Fisher Stevens as Dale Myerson
- Judge Reinhold as Buford Lowry
- Patrick Dempsey as Tom Harris
- Carl Reiner as Norman Friedler
- Colleen Camp as Mrs. Lowry
- Mary Pat Gleason as Doris
- Dey Young as School Board Member

== Awards ==
Both Amanda Plummer and Laura San Giacomo were nominated for Best Supporting Actress in a Movie or Miniseries at the 18th CableACE Awards, with Plummer winning the award.
