= Royce D. Applegate =

American actor and screenwriter

- Born: Royce Dwayne Applegate; December 25, 1939; Midwest City, Oklahoma, U.S.
- Died: January 1, 2003 (aged 63); Hollywood Hills, Los Angeles, California, U.S.
- Resting place: Woodland Memorial Park Cemetery in Sand Springs, Oklahoma
- Other names: Roy Applegate; Royce Applegate
- Occupations: Actor; screenwriter; author
- Years active: 1969–2003
- Spouse: Norma Applegate (m. 1958; div. 1969)

Royce Dwayne Applegate (December 25, 1939 – January 1, 2003) was an American actor and screenwriter who was first billed as Roy Applegate.

Born in Midwest City, Oklahoma, his most visible role was that of Chief Petty Officer Manilow Crocker on the first season of the television series seaQuest DSV.

Applegate portrayed Deputy Crawford in Stir Crazy (1985). In that year, he also appeared in two episodes of Diff'rent Strokes, playing family man-turned-kidnapper Donald Brown, a father who kidnaps character Sam McKinney in order to replace his own dead son.

Applegate was a top-billed ensemble cast member in the 1987 Richard Fleischer-directed, It's a Mad, Mad, Mad, Mad World- and Midnight Madness-esque screwball comedy film Million Dollar Mystery, playing the dim-witted roadside desert diner proprietor Tugger.

Applegate twice co-starred under the direction of The Coen Brothers, appearing in both O Brother, Where Art Thou? (2000) and Intolerable Cruelty (2003), the latter of which was his final screen role, and released posthumously.

He portrayed Confederate General James L. Kemper in two films, Gettysburg (1993) and Gods and Generals (2003).

On New Year's Day 2003, Applegate died aged 63 at his Hollywood Hills home in a fire.

== Partial filmography ==
=== Film ===
List of Live-Action Performances in Theatrical Released Movies
Year	Title	Role
1972	Fuzz	Patrolman Cramer (Note: Credited as Roy Applegate)
1972	They Only Kill Their Masters	Harry
1972	The Mad Bomber	Man in Car
1974	The Last Porno Flick	Policeman #1
1976	Chesty Anderson, USN	Phil
1977	Prime Time a.k.a. American Raspberry	Miracle White Announcer
1978	Harper Valley P.T.A.	"Dutch"
1978	Loose Shoes	Delmus
1980	Alligator	Callan
1981	Back Roads	The Father
1981	History of the World: Part I	Coming Attractions
1984	Splash	Buckwalter
1986	Armed and Dangerous	2nd Toxic Guard
1987	From the Hip	Mr. Wilby
1987	Rampage	Gene Tippetts
1987	Million Dollar Mystery	Tugger
1992	White Sands	Peterson
1993	Gettysburg	Brigadier General James L. Kemper
1994	The Getaway	Gun Shop Salesman
1995	Under Siege 2: Dark Territory	Ryback's Cook
1998	Phoenix	Dickerman
1998	Dr. Dolittle	"I Love You" Dog (voice)
2000	O Brother, Where Art Thou?	Man with Bullhorn
2002	The Rookie	Henry
2003	Gods and Generals	Brigadier General James L. Kemper
2003	Seabiscuit	'Dutch' Doogan
2003	Intolerable Cruelty	Mr. Gutman

=== Television Film ===
List of Performances in Television Movies
Year	Title	Role
1974	Cry Panic	Grady
1975	Attack on Terror: The FBI vs. the Ku Klux Klan	John Worden
1990	Murder in Mississippi	Deputy Winter
1998	Poodle Springs	Ivan, The Motel Manager
1999	Inherit the Wind	George Sillers

=== Television ===
List of Performances on Television
Year	Title	Role	Episodes
1969-1971	That Girl	Harry; Bill	Hearing Today, Gone Tomorrow; Two for the Money
1970	Mayberry R.F.D.	Guy With Headband	Sensitivity Training
1971	Mod Squad	Eddie	The Price of Love
1979	Charlie's Angels	"Bingo"	
1981	Flamingo Road	"Tiny"	
1981	Hart to Hart	Billy Ray Thompson	
1981	Little House on the Prairie	Georgie	
1981-1982	CHiPs	Roger Brown; Dewayne	Ponch's Angels Part I and II; Silent Partner
1981-1985	The Dukes of Hazzard	Insurance Adjuster / Harry Ray Pearson	
1982	The Blue and the Gray	1st Cell Reporter	
1982	T.J. Hooker	Frank Durbin	
1985	Diff'rent Strokes	Donald Brown, Sam's Kidnapper	
1989	Mike Hammer: Murder Takes All	William Bundy	
1990	Twin Peaks	Reverend Clarence Brocklehurst	
1993-1994	seaQuest DSV	Chief Manilow Crocker	
1998-2001	JAG	Craig Allenby	
2000	CSI: Crime Scene Investigation	Mr. Laferty	Episode: "Pilot

=== Writer ===
- Loose Shoes (1980)
- Evil Town (1987)
