= Jonathan Brandis =

American actor (1976–2003)

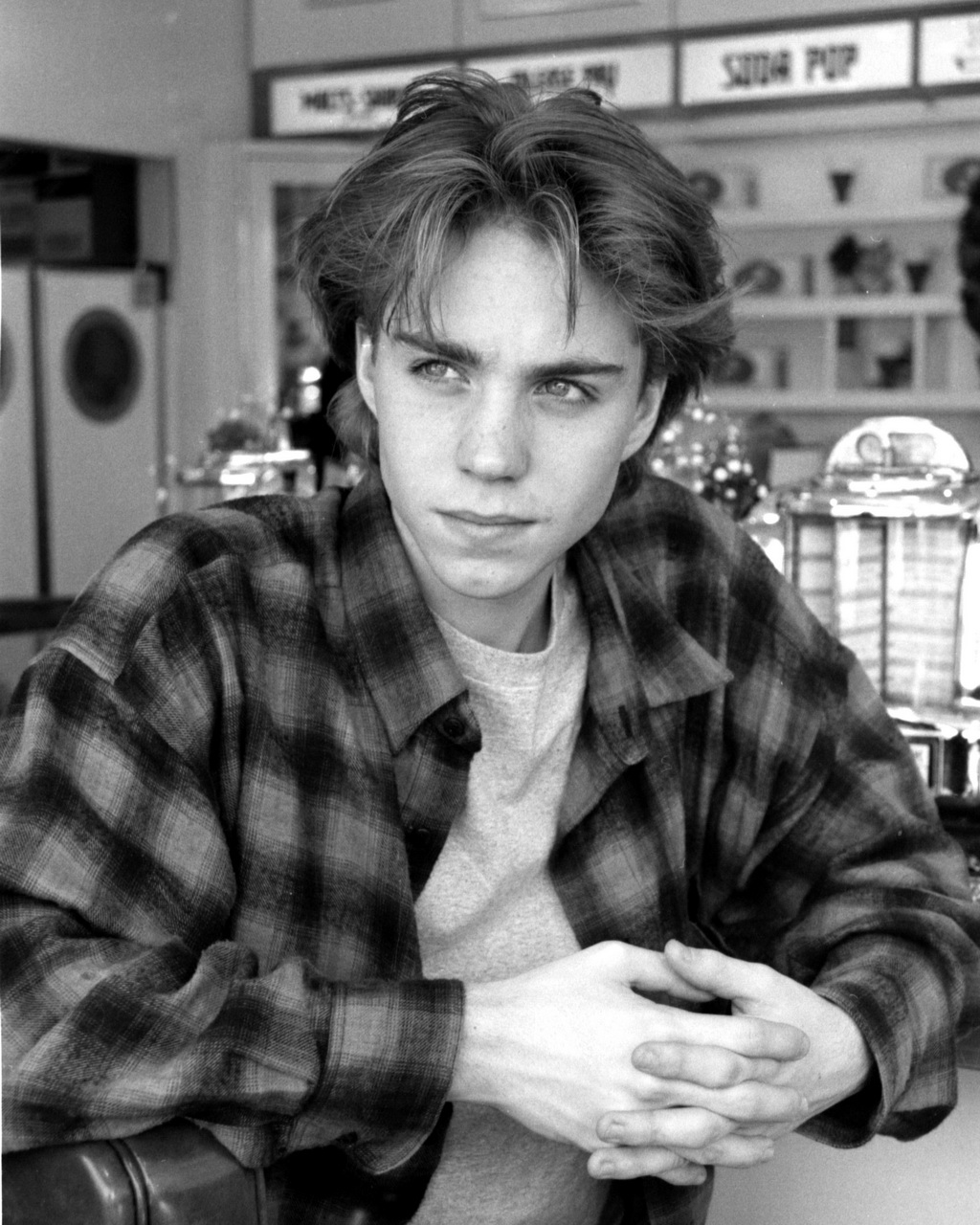
- Brandis in 1993
- Born: Jonathan Gregory Brandis; April 13, 1976; Danbury, Connecticut, U.S.
- Died: November 12, 2003 (aged 27); Los Angeles, California, U.S.
- Education: San Fernando Valley Professional School
- Occupation: Actor
- Years active: 1978–2003
- Awards: Young Artist Award (1994) for SeaQuest DSV

Jonathan Gregory Brandis (April 13, 1976 – November 12, 2003) was an American actor. Beginning his career as a child model, Brandis moved on to acting in commercials and subsequently won television and film roles. Brandis made his acting debut in 1982 as Kevin Buchanan on the soap opera One Life to Live. In 1990, he portrayed Bill Denbrough in the television miniseries It, and starred as Bastian Bux in The NeverEnding Story II: The Next Chapter. In 1993, at the age of 17, he was cast in the role of teen prodigy Lucas Wolenczak on the NBC series seaQuest DSV. The character was popular among teenage viewers, and Brandis regularly appeared in teen magazines. He died by suicide in 2003.

== Early life ==
Jonathan Gregory Brandis was born on April 13, 1976, in Danbury, Connecticut, the only child of Mary, a teacher and personal manager, and Gregory Brandis, a food distributor and firefighter. At the age of two, he began his career as a child model for Buster Brown shoes. At the age of four, Brandis began acting in television commercials. He attended San Fernando Valley Professional School, graduating in 1993.

== Career ==
At age six, Brandis won the role of Kevin Buchanan on the soap opera One Life to Live. He moved to Los Angeles with his family at age nine and made guest appearances on shows such as Blossom; L.A. Law; Who's the Boss?; Murder, She Wrote; The Wonder Years; Full House; Webster and Kate & Allie.

At age 13, Brandis was cast in his first starring role as Bastian Bux in The NeverEnding Story II: The Next Chapter. He played the young Bill Denbrough in the 1990 television miniseries It, based on the epic horror novel of the same name. Brandis's performance in the miniseries was lauded by critics and audiences. Brandis was cast as the lead in two films made close together, first as Barry Gabrewski in Sidekicks and then starring as Matthew/Martha in Ladybugs.

Around age 17, Brandis landed one of his best-known roles, as scientific prodigy Lucas Wolenczak in Steven Spielberg's futuristic science fiction series seaQuest DSV. The role propelled him into teen idol status. At the height of his popularity, Brandis received approximately 4,000 fan letters a week and had to be escorted onto the set of seaQuest DSV by three studio security guards because of the many female fans present. He voiced Mozenrath, an evil young sorcerer, in Disney's animated series Aladdin.

After seaQuest DSV was cancelled in 1996, 20-year-old Brandis appeared in the television film Her Last Chance. His next role was in the television film Born Free: A New Adventure, which was shot in South Africa. He continued his career in supporting roles in Outside Providence and Ride with the Devil (both in 1999). In 2000, he costarred in Bad Girls from Valley High, which, because of distribution problems, was not released until 2005, two years after his death. Brandis had a small role in Hart's War (2002). In 2003, he was cast in 111 Gramercy Park, a pilot that was not picked up by the network. He made his final onscreen appearance in the action drama Puerto Vallarta Squeeze in 2004, which was also released posthumously. He was friends with fellow child actor-turned-teen idol Soleil Moon Frye and was featured in her 2021 documentary Kid 90, which was culled from Frye's extensive collection of home video footage shot during the 1990s.

== Personal life ==
From 1995 to 2001, Brandis dated actress and singer Tatyana Ali. The then-couple appeared in an article in People magazine in July 1996.

== Death ==
On November 11, 2003, Brandis was found hanged in the hallway of his Los Angeles apartment. He was transported to Cedars-Sinai Medical Center and died the following day of injuries sustained from the hanging at the age of 27.

Brandis did not leave a suicide note. After his death, friends reported that he had been depressed about his extended career lull and was reportedly disappointed when his appearance in the 2002 war drama Hart's War—a role he hoped would revive his career—was significantly reduced to a mere deleted scene in the film's final cut. Brandis began drinking heavily and said that he intended to kill himself.

In 2021, Brandis's father speculated that Brandis could have suffered from bipolar disorder. He told People, "His death wasn't due to the entertainment industry. I look back now, and in his 20s, he showed signs of manic depression. I hope that anyone suffering can go get help."

== Filmography ==
=== Film ===
Year	Title	Role	Notes
1987	Fatal Attraction	Party guest	
1988	Oliver & Company	Additional voices	Voice
1988	The Wrong Guys	Kid Tim	
1989	Pet Sematary	Narrator	Voice
1989	Stepfather II	Todd Grayland	
1990	Ghost Dad	Additional voices	Voice
1990	The NeverEnding Story II: The Next Chapter	Bastian Bux	
1992	Ladybugs	Matthew / Martha	
1992	Sidekicks	Barry Gabrewski	
1998	Aladdin's Arabian Adventures: Magic Makers	Mozenrath	Voice; direct-to-video
1999	Outside Providence	Mousy	
1999	Ride with the Devil	Cave Wyatt	
2002	Hart's War	Lewis P. Wakely	
2002	The Year That Trembled	Casey Pedersen	
2003	Between the Sheets	Robert Avocado	
2004	Puerto Vallarta Squeeze	Neil Weatherford	Released posthumously
2004	The Slainesville Boys	—	Director and producer; released posthumously
2005	Bad Girls from Valley High	Drew	Filmed in 2000; direct-to-video; released posthumously
2021	Kid 90	Himself	Documentary; released posthumously

=== Television ===
Year	Title	Role	Notes
1982–1983	One Life to Live	Kevin Buchanan	Unknown episodes
1984	Kate & Allie	Chip's friend	Episode: "Odd Boy Out"
1986	Mystery Magical Special	Himself	Television special
1986	Sledge Hammer!	Young Sledge	Episode: "They Shoot Hammers, Don't They?"
1987	Buck James	Unknown role	Episode: "Sin of the Father"
1987	Duet	Danny	Episode: "Jane's Getting Serious"
1987	Good Morning, Miss Bliss	Michael Thompson	Pilot
1987	L.A. Law	Kevin Talbot	2 episodes
1987	Poor Little Rich Girl: The Barbara Hutton Story	Lance Reventlow (age 11)	Television film
1988	Mars: Base One	Unknown role	Television film
1988	Webster	Bobby	Episode: "Take My Cousin, Please"
1989	Full House	Michael Monford	Episode: "A Little Romance"
1989	Who's the Boss?	Paul	Episode: "Your Grandmother's a Bimbo"
1990	Alien Nation	Andron	Episode: "The Touch"
1990	The Earth Day Special	Himself	Television special
1990	The Flash	Terry Cohan	Episode: "Child's Play"
1990	It	Young Bill Denbrough	Miniseries
1990	The Munsters Today	Matt Glover	Episode: "The Silver Bullet"
1990	Murder, She Wrote	Kevin Bryce	Episode: "If the Shoe Fits"
1991	Blossom	Stevie	Episode: "To Tell the Truth"
1991	Gabriel's Fire	Matthew Fixx	Episode: "Truth and Consequences"
1991	Our Shining Moment	Michael "Scooter" McGuire	Television film
1991	Pros and Cons	Danny	Episode: "Once a Kid"
1991	The Wonder Years	Steve	Episode: "The Yearbook"
1992	Crossroads	Michael Stahl	Episode: "Freedom of the Road"
1992	Do Not Bring That Python in the House	Gabriel Miller	Television film
1993	Saved by the Bell: The College Years	Himself	Episode: "A Thanksgiving Story"
1993–1996	seaQuest DSV	Lucas Wolenczak	Main role; also co-wrote episode "The Siamese Dream"
1994	Good King Wenceslas	Prince Wenceslas	Television film
1994	Masters Of Illusion	Himself	Documentary
1994–1995	Aladdin	Mozenrath	Voice; 8 episodes
1996	Born Free: A New Adventure	Randolph "Rand" Thompson	Television film
1996	Fall into Darkness	Chad	Television film
1996	Her Last Chance	Preston Altherton	Television film
1997	Two Came Back	Jason	Television film
2003	111 Gramercy Park	Will Karnegian	Unsold pilot

== Awards and nominations ==
Award	Year	Category	Nominated work	Result
Saturn Awards	1992	Best Performance by a Younger Actor	The NeverEnding Story II: The Next Chapter	Nominated
Young Artist Awards	1990	Best Young Actor Guest Starring in a Television Series	The Flash	Nominated
Young Artist Awards	1991	Best Young Actor Starring in a Motion Picture	The NeverEnding Story II: The Next Chapter	Nominated
Young Artist Awards	1993	Outstanding Young Ensemble Cast in a Motion Picture	Ladybugs (shared with cast)	Nominated
Young Artist Awards	1993	Best Young Actor Starring in a Motion Picture	Ladybugs	Nominated
Young Artist Awards	1994	Best Youth Actor Leading Role in a Television Series	seaQuest DSV	Won
Young Artist Awards	1995	Best Performance by a Youth Actor in a TV Mini-Series or Special	Good King Wenceslas	Nominated
