= Mary Tillotson =

American journalist

Mary Tillotson (previously known as Mary Wright, fl. 1970) is an American broadcast journalist formerly with CNN, for whom she was a White House correspondent and host of CNN & Co.

== Biography ==
Tillotson grew up in Tuscaloosa, and attended the University of Alabama majoring in journalism.

=== Journalism ===
She worked for WSB in Atlanta, Georgia from 1970 to 1975. After a move to Washington, D.C. she worked as a reporter and anchor with WTTG-TV in Washington, D.C.; a congressional reporter for the Independent Television News Association; and as a news anchor for Mutual Radio Network.

She was hired by CNN in 1981, and from 1985 to 1988 and 1991-1993 was the CNN White House correspondent. From 1988 to 1991 she was a Congressional correspondent. She covered the 1984 presidential campaign, including the Democratic National Convention, and the 1988 Republican and Democratic National Conventions, as well as the 1992 presidential campaign; she also covered two international summits between Ronald Reagan and Mikhail Gorbachev.

From 1993 to 1999 she was the permanent host for CNN & Co., a talk show highlighting female policy experts covering current news.

=== George H.W. Bush adultery question ===
In 1992, while working as a member of the White House press pool for CNN, she questioned then-president George H. W. Bush at a White House news conference about never-proven allegations of adulterous behavior, which had been reported by the New York Post. President Bush replied: "I'm not going to take any sleazy questions like that from CNN."

Bush spokesman Marlin Fitzwater later said that Tillotson "will never work around the White House again," The New York Times reported.

Early on the morning of the news conference, August 11, 1992, editors at CNN's Atlanta headquarters faxed Tillotson, who was working with other reporters at the Bush family compound in Kennebunkport, Maine, a copy of the New York Post story alleging Bush's extramarital affair.

Bush and Democratic rival Bill Clinton were in the midst of an intense presidential campaign, and the Bush re-election staff often mused aloud (though not for attribution) that Clinton was not suitable for the Oval Office because of questions about "family values," his "character," and his reputation as an adulterer.

Reporters attending the Kennebunkport news conference were herded behind a rope line. Before the news conference, one of spokesman Fitzwater's young press office assistants walked the rope line asking which reporter might ask about the Post story.

Before Tillotson was called on, several other reporters received a so-called "Presidential Point"—meaning a question was allowed. They all asked about Middle East politics. When Mr. Bush nodded in Tillotson's direction, she asked if the president, given the importance his campaign placed on "family values," wouldn't like to respond to the New York Post story. Mr. Bush, as quoted above, excoriated Tillotson and CNN for the "sleazy" question.

After the news conference, Tillotson joined the presidential motorcade for a ride to Air Force One and its return flight to Washington. A CNN assignment editor reached her by cell phone to tell her she would likely be fired because of the controversy surrounding her question.

Upon her return to the White House press work space, Tillotson was virtually alone. Most of the White House press corps had chosen to return to Washington later on a designated press plane, not Air Force One. Tillotson heard Anna Perez, who was first lady Barbara Bush's press secretary, coming down the stairs towards CNN's work space. She loudly called, "Mary Tillotson? Mary Tillotson?" as she descended the steps.

Stopping at the door of the CNN booth, Perez raised her hand in benediction and said "I absolve you," burst into a belly laugh, and left.

Late that afternoon, Dateline NBC's Stone Phillips interviewed Mr. Bush at the White House and also asked about the Post story. Bush again refused to answer, explaining, "... you're perpetuating the sleaze by even asking the question, to say nothing of asking it in the Oval Office, and I don't think you ought to do that, and I'm not going to answer the question," The Times reported.

An NBC camera crew who recorded the interview said Phillips had apologized to the president off-camera. Phillips explained to Bush that he had asked the question because bosses at NBC had ordered him to, according to the NBC crew.

The next day, Fitzwater asked Tillotson why she had asked the question. She answered that the story had been reported and was already known. She was simply covering a presidential campaign and her job was to ask such questions of the candidates. Her employers expected no less, she said.

In a book years later, Fitzwater transformed the scene: he wrote that Tillotson wept and said her bosses had ordered her to ask about Fitzgerald.

== Return to academia ==
In 2006, Tillotson returned to her hometown of Tuscaloosa, where she currently resides. There, she became a faculty member of the Osher Lifelong Learning Institute (OLLI) at the University of Alabama, and is now an instructor. During her lectures, she has given classes on the nature of news and newsmaking, and how public policy topics are reflected in the news.

== Personal life ==
By 2014, she was known to have retired from journalism. Since that year through 2015, she has also given, and continues to give speeches in her home state of Alabama about her life and work.

As of January 2018, Tillotson is listed as the secretary of the Tuscaloosa Symphony Guild since at least October 26, 2015.

Tillotson has supported the College of Arts and Sciences at the University of Alabama.
