= Mark Fauser =

American actor

- Occupations: Actor, director, writer, producer
- Years active: Television and movies: 1992–present; theatre:?–present
- Website: http://www.markfauser.com/

Mark Fauser is an American actor, director, screenwriter, and producer who currently operates the independent film movie studio, Overlook Productions.

He has written several teleplays, plays, and movies, and has done major studio rewrites for companies such as Universal Studios, Paramount Pictures, Columbia Pictures and CBS Television. In 2002 his movie It's All About You (starring John D'Aquino) was the "Winner for Best Comedy" at the 2001 Beverly Hills Film Festival.

== Selected works ==
Actor

- Waking Up in Reno (2002) .... Boyd
- It's All About You (2002) .... Mark
- Journey of Redemption (2002) .... Doug
- Madison (2001) .... Travis
- Between the Sheets (1998) .... Nasal reporter
- JAG (TV) ("Recovery") (1996) .... Captain Matthews
- Coach (TV) ("The Popcorn Bowl") (1994) .... Reporter No. 1
- seaQuest DSV (TV) (1993/1994) (Recurring character) .... Lieutenant Dalton Phillips
- The New WKRP in Cincinnati (TV) (2 episodes) (1992/1993) .... Fire Captain
- Evening Shade (TV) (4 episodes) (1991–1992) .... Bill
- Quantum Leap (TV) (Moments to Live By) (1992) .... Policeman
- Freeze Frame (TV) (1992) .... Sonny

Director

- It's All About You (Film and Play)

Writer:
Movies

- Waking Up in Reno (2002)
- It's All About You (2002)
- The Right To Remain Silent (TV) (1996) (teleplay)
- Evening Shade (TV) ("Mama Knows Best" and "Educating Calvin") (1994)

Plays

- It's All About You
- Pa's Funeral
- The Right To Remain Silent
- The King of Cool (A Tribute To James Dean)

Producer

- It's All About You (Film and Play)
