= Edward Kerr =

American actor (born 1966)

- Born: October 14, 1966 (age 59); Kansas City, Missouri, U.S.
- Occupation: Actor
- Years active: 1993–present
- Spouse: Michelle Stanford (m. 2012)
- Children: 2

Edward Kerr (born October 14, 1966) is an American actor. He has also been credited as Ed Kerr.

Raised in Kansas City, Missouri, he attended Rockhurst High School and Vanderbilt University before deciding to pursue an acting career.

He moved to Hollywood and landed a holding deal at NBC, and starred in two of the network's primetime series, The Secrets of Lake Success and seaQuest DSV and followed by a starring role in the feature film Above Suspicion. He earned critical praise as the lead in the TNT cable feature program, Legalese, and starred in the festival comedy Confessions of a Sexist Pig.

Kerr later costarred on the 1999 series Snoops and joined the cast of NBC's comedy series Three Sisters.

He married Michelle Stanford on August 24, 2012. They have a son, Walker Travers Kerr, born on St. Patrick's Day, 2013.

== Partial filmography and TV credits ==
1. The Secrets of Lake Success (1993) (Miniseries).... Tony Parrish
2. SeaQuest DSV .... Lt. James Brody (27 episodes, 1994–1996)
3. Above Suspicion (1995) .... Nick Cain
4. Magic Island (1995) (Direct-to-video) .... Prince Morgan
5. Touched by an Angel .... Kevin Abernathy (1 episode, 1996)
6. Legalese (1998) (TV movie) .... Roy Guyton
7. Snoops (1999) .... Det. Greg McCormack (unknown episodes)
8. The Astronaut's Wife (1999) .... Pilot
9. Sex and the City .... Jason (1 episode, 2000)
10. Three Sisters .... Jasper G. "Jake" Riley (10 episodes, 2001–2002)
11. Dexter Prep (2002) (TV movie) .... Jim
12. Monk .... Denny Graf (1 episode, 2004)
13. What I Like About You .... Rick (15 episodes, 2004–2005)
14. CSI: Miami .... Tom Hanford (1 episode, 2005)
15. Men in Trees .... Ian Slattery (2 episodes, 2006)
16. Close to Home .... Kyle Cantrell (1 episode, 2006)
17. Heist .... Det. Roy Thomas (1 episode, 2006)
18. You Did What? (2006) .... Charlie Porter
19. Freddie .... James (1 episode, 2006)
20. House .... Ted (1 episode, 2006)
21. Girls on the Bus (2006) (Television pilot)
22. Ambition To Meaning (2008) ..... Chad Moore
23. Pretty Little Liars ..... Ted Wilson (11 episodes, 2012–2017)
24. Hot in Cleveland ..... Rex (1 episode, 2013)
25. Lucifer ..... Don Zeikel (1 episode, 2018)
26. SEAL Team ..... Captain Edwards (1 episode, 2019)
