= Rosalind Allen =

New Zealand actress

- Born: Rosalind E. Ingledew; September 23, 1957 (age 68); New Zealand
- Occupation: Actress
- Years active: 1984–2002; 2021–present
- Spouse: Todd Allen (m. 1990; div. 2005)

Rosalind Allen (born September 23, 1957) is a New Zealand-born actress, best known for her portrayal of Doctor Wendy Smith in the second season of seaQuest DSV.

== Early life ==
Born Rosalind E. Ingledew in New Zealand, she studied acting there, before moving to the United States.

== Career ==
Her first movie appearance was as an extra in the film Three Men and a Little Lady, and after guest appearances on a number of daytime dramas dating back to the mid-1980s, and a fairly large part in Children of the Corn II: The Final Sacrifice, as well as several independent films, Allen was signed as a main character in NBC's popular sci-fi series, seaQuest DSV, but she left after one season.

Like her seaQuest predecessor (Stephanie Beacham), she appeared in an episode of Star Trek: The Next Generation. Allen also appeared alongside her then husband Todd Allen in seaQuest DSV in the episode "The Siamese Dream".

Allen twice portrayed the love interest of Bobby Ewing (Patrick Duffy), though as different characters, on both the final episode of the original run of Dallas and the first reunion TV movie Dallas: J.R. Returns.

== Filmography ==
Film and television
Year	Title	Role	Notes
1984	Riptide	Waitress	Episode: "Somebody's Killing the Great Geeks of America"
1984	T. J. Hooker	Judy	Episode: "Death on the Line"
1984	Double Trouble	Marcy	Episode: "Dueling Feet"
1984	St. Elsewhere	Beverly Colfax	Episode: "My Aim Is True"
1984	Knight Rider	Car Buyer	Episode: "A Good Knight's Work"
1984	Cover Up	Holly Watson	Episode: "Sudden Exposure"
1985	Cover Up	Barbara Carroll	Episode: "Who's Trying to Kill Miss Globe?"
1985	Perfect	Sterling	
1985	Knight Rider	Samantha Lawton	Episode: "Knight Behind Bars"
1986	8 Million Ways to Die	Tote Lady	
1986	Dangerously Close	Mrs. McDonald	
1987	The Hogan Family	Regina	Episode: "Nightmare on Oak Street"
1987	All My Children	Silver Kane / Noelle Keaton	TV series
1988	Matlock	Linda Michaels	Episode: "The Body"
1988	L.A. Law	Officer Sandra Davis	Episode: "Hand Roll Express"
1988	Star Trek: The Next Generation	Yanar	Episode: "The Outrageous Okona"
1989	A Peaceable Kingdom	Isabelle	Episode: "Moonstruck"
1989	Designing Women	Terry Wilder	Episode: "Julia Drives Over the First Amendment"
1990	Freddy's Nightmares	Mrs. Lowe	Episode: "What You Don't Know Can Kill You"
1990	Dream On	Lauren	Episode: "The First Episode"; Episode: "The Trojan War"
1990	Three Men and a Little Lady	Pretty Girl	
1990	Santa Barbara	Gretchen Richards	28 episodes
1991	Son of Darkness: To Die For II	Nina	
1991	Dallas	Annie Ewing	Episode: "Conundrum": Parts 1 and 2
1992	Jake and the Fatman	Sherry Manville	Episode: "I Can't Believe I'm Losing You"
1992	Children of the Corn II: The Final Sacrifice	Angela Casual	
1993	Bodies of Evidence	Grace Devlin	3 episodes
1993	Ticks	Holly Lambert	Video
1994	Seinfeld	Diane DeConn	Episode: "The Marine Biologist"
1994	Naked Gun 33 1/3: The Final Insult	Bobbi	
1994	Love Affair	Qantas Flight Attendant	
1994–1995	seaQuest DSV	Dr. Wendy Smith	21 episodes
1996	Touched by an Angel	Evie Mateos	Episode: "Rock 'N' Roll Dad"
1996	Boy Meets World	Susan	Episode: "Stormy Weather"
1996	Home Improvement	Kelly Barnes	Episode: "Eye on Tim"
1996	Pinocchio's Revenge	Jennifer Garrick	
1996	Mother	Woman at Gas Station	
1996	Dallas: J.R. Returns	Julia Cunningham	TV movie
1997	Murder One	Suzanne Lawson	3 episodes
1997	Promised Land	Jenny Lillienthal	Episode: "St. Russell"
1998	Silk Stalkings	Miss Jackson	Episode: "Teacher's Pet"
1998	Beyond Belief: Fact or Fiction	Barb Nouveau	Episode: "The Warning"
2002	Titus	Stewardess #2	Episode: "Insanity Genetic: Part 1"
