= Diagnosis: Murder season 1 =

Diagnosis: Murder
- Season 1
- No. of episodes: 19

Release
- Original network: CBS
- Original release: October 29, 1993 – May 13, 1994

Season chronology
- ← Previous; TV films (1992–1993) Next → Season 2

Diagnosis: Murder's first season originally aired Fridays at 8:00-9:00 pm (EST). The season was released on DVD by Paramount Home Video. It included the 1991 pilot "It Never Entered My Mind" from the fourth season of Jake and the Fatman.

== Cast ==
- Dick Van Dyke as Dr. Mark Sloan
- Scott Baio as Dr. Jack Stewart
- Victoria Rowell as Dr. Amanda Bentley
- Barry Van Dyke as Steve Sloan
- Michael Tucci as Norman Briggs
- Delores Hall as Delores Mitchell

== Episodes ==
No. overall	No. in season	Title	Directed by	Written by	Original release date	U.S. viewers (millions)
1	1	"Miracle Cure"	Michael Lange	James Kramer	October 29, 1993	14.6
Dr. Mark Sloan investigates the hit-and-run death of an ex-con, who was killed by his uncaught accomplice (Robert Guillaume) in his crime, who is now posing as a priest. Mark also has trouble with a homeless woman (Sylvia Sidney) who is hospitalized with an illness that resembles dementia and keeps running off, unaware she witnessed the murder.
2	2	"Amnesia"	Michael Lange	Story by : Joyce Burditt and David Hoffman and Leslie Daryl Zerg; Teleplay by : Joyce Burditt	November 5, 1993	12.7
A woman arrives at the hospital claiming to be an amnesiac, but Sloan's probing of her past leads him to discover she's a mob assassin and believe that she's plotting to murder a hospitalized senator. However, her actual target is the doctor operating on the senator, who is a witness in a case against the mob.
3	3	"Murder at the Telethon"	Anson Williams	Vance DeGeneres	November 12, 1993	12.5
A comedian (Dom DeLuise) who was hosting a telethon for the hospital is murdered, so Sloan investigates and discovers the victim had a long list of people who'd want him dead, including his own son. Dick Martin, Granville Vandusen, Steven Anderson, Dick Van Patten, and Joyce Van Patten also guest star.
4	4	"Inheritance of Death"	Frank Thackery	Gerry Conway	November 19, 1993	12.4
A millionaire dies after declaring his intention to leave his money to the hospital - and Sloan suspects the man's offspring. Note: In addition to Sloan, Dick Van Dyke plays the millionaire Johnathan Nash and his sons Julian Nash and J. Edison Nash and his daughter Judith Nash. Guest Star: Michael Champion
5	5	"The 13 Million Dollar Man"	Anson Williams	Gordon T. Dawson	December 3, 1993	12.5
When a dying man gives him a lottery ticket worth millions, Sloan must fight his way through competing claims in order to give the money to charity. Guest Star: Ken Kercheval
6	6	"Vanishing Act: Part 1"	Christian I. Nyby II	Bruce Franklin Singer	December 10, 1993	11.2
Steve is framed for the murder of an internal-affairs officer by one of his senior officers, one of a group of four dirty cops that's involved in a drug trade. Guest Star: Richard Gant, Dennis Lipscomb, John Beck, and Boyd Kestner.
7	7	"Vanishing Act: Part 2"	Christian I. Nyby II	Bruce Franklin Singer	December 17, 1993	11.1
Dr. Sloan and Jack use connections to the underworld to expose the dirty cops and figure out which one set up Steve for murder. Guest Stars: Richard Gant, Boyd Kestner, John Beck, and Don Gordon
8	8	"Shanda's Song"	Neema Barnette	Craig Volk	January 7, 1994	14.8
Dr. Sloan hunts for the stalker of a female pop star who possibly killed a backup singer.
9	9	"The Restless Remains"	Christian I. Nyby II	Story by : John Hill; Teleplay by : Robert Schlitt	January 14, 1994	16.2
An infomercial financial guru arrives at Mark's house claiming to have been poisoned, dies in the living room, and disappears without a trace. His staff and his wife claim he's still alive, but make excuses as to why Mark never sees him and he suspects something's up. A side gag involves Mark diagnosing and treating a security guard at the studio who has jaw pain. Guest Stars: Ned Romero
10	10	"Murder with Mirrors"	Anson Williams	Gerry Conway	January 21, 1994	16.8
Dr. Sloan works to clear a friend that's involved in the murder of a magician who was about to leave Mark's friend to go solo. Special Guest Star: Emma Samms Guest Stars: Ray Buktenica, Jack Laufer, and Mitchell Whitfield.
11	11	"Flashdance with Death"	Christian I. Nyby II	Gerry Conway	January 28, 1994	17.2
Dr. Sloan uses a few leads to find out who's responsible for the death of a dance studio's unfavorable co-owner. Guest Stars: Paula Marshall, and Kristoff St. John. Watch for a dancer called Shannon, played by Elizabeth Berkley, star of Saved by the Bell and Showgirls.
12	12	"Reunion with Murder"	Anson Williams	Robin Madden	February 4, 1994	16.3
Amanda is suspected of murdering an old college roommate who had written a tell-all book about her sorority sisters. Mark believes the key to finding the true killer is locating the book before the killer does. Note: The dog that Amanda adopts is who she names "Yoda".
13	13	"Lily"	Frank Thackery	Gerry Conway	March 4, 1994	16.6
When a call girl who was blackmailing some of her clients ends up dead, Mark sorts through her clients to find out who killed her. Guest Star: Gerald McRaney
14	14	"Guardian Angel"	Christian I. Nyby II	Bruce Franklin Singer	April 1, 1994	13.3
After the city's mayor is murdered, Sloan investigates the peculiar behavior of the politician's widow. Guest Star: James McEachin, who plays the police Lt. Frank Daniels in six episodes of Matlock (1986 TV series) and Lt. Ed Brock in the Perry Mason TV movies). (He plays a derelict in this episode.)
15	15	"Nirvana"	Christian I. Nyby II	Peter Dunne	April 8, 1994	13.6
Dr. Sloan follows a few leads to a spa in his investigation of a con man's murder.
16	16	"Broadcast Blues"	Christian I. Nyby II	James Kramer	April 15, 1994	15.3
A convict that Dr. Sloan examines takes everyone at the hospital hostage - and two deaths occur during the hostage situation. Mark suspects that the convict was murdered but the only clue is the man's last words.
17	17	"Shaker"	Alan Myerson	Gerry Conway	April 29, 1994	13.6
Dr. Sloan suspects foul play after a friend dies in an earthquake. Guest Star: Allan Miller
18	18	"The Plague"	Peter Ellis	Gerry Conway	May 6, 1994	13.9
Dr. Sloan comes to suspect that someone could have deliberately exposed a hit man to the bubonic plague. Guest Stars: Julie Sommars (Julie March in the TV Series Matlock), and David Froman (Lieutenant Bob Brooks in Matlock).
19	19	"Sister Michael Wants You"	Leo Penn	Joyce Burditt	May 13, 1994	13.7
Dr. Sloan goes undercover as a priest to help a nun catch a murderer in her convent after a director is shot and the investigation uncovers a plot to buy out said convent. Guest Star: Delta Burke
