= Diagnosis: Murder season 2 =

Diagnosis: Murder
- Season 2
- No. of episodes: 22

Release
- Original network: CBS
- Original release: September 16, 1994 – May 5, 1995

Season chronology
- ← Previous; Season 1 Next → Season 3

Diagnosis: Murder's second season originally aired Fridays at 8:00-9:00 pm (EST). In episode 21, Lauralee Bell, Eric Braeden, Jeanne Cooper, Doug Davidson, Kristoff St. John, Melody Thomas Scott, and Heather Tom guest star.

== Cast ==
- Dick Van Dyke as Dr. Mark Sloan
- Scott Baio as Dr. Jack Stewart
- Victoria Rowell as Dr. Amanda Bentley
- Michael Tucci as Norman Briggs
- Delores Hall as Delores Mitchell
- Barry Van Dyke as Steve Sloan

== Episodes ==
No. overall	No. in season	Title	Directed by	Written by	Original release date	U.S. viewers (millions)
20	1	"Many Happy Returns"	Lou Antonio	Lee Goldberg and William Rabkin	September 16, 1994	14.7
Sloan is faced with both a murder investigation and an audit from the IRS. Guest Star: Holland Taylor as IRS Agent Gretchen McCord.
21	2	"A Very Fatal Funeral"	Alan Myerson	Gerry Conway	September 23, 1994	14.9
Briggs is a suspect in the deaths of a charity's chairman and many board members. Guest Star: Michelle Phillips.
22	3	"Woman Trouble"	Roy Campanella II	Joyce Burditt	September 30, 1994	14.5
Sloan suspects that something's afoot when a rich patient misses an appointment and vanishes. Guest Star: Sally Kellerman and Janet Julian. Note: Michael Tucci does not appear in this episode.
23	4	"The Busy Body"	Vincent McEveety	Dan Wilcox	October 7, 1994	15.3
On his birthday, Sloan is forced to deal with both hospital inspectors and the disappearing body of a lawyer who was murdered in the hospital pharmacy.
24	5	"My Four Husbands"	Christian I. Nyby II	Robin Bernheim	October 14, 1994	14.0
Mark's celebrity niece (Morgan Fairchild) is framed for the murder of one of her ex-husbands (Gerrit Graham). Sal Viscuso also guest stars.
25	6	"Murder Most Vial"	Richard Compton	Richard Collins	October 21, 1994	13.6
Sloan probes the death of a media mogul who threatened to sue the hospital. Guest Stars: Ken Kercheval, Christine Belford, and John Rubinstein.
26	7	"You Can Call Me Johnson"	Christian I. Nyby II	John Wirth	October 28, 1994	14.2
Sloan operates on Jack's "godfather," who unexpectedly dies after the surgery. Guest Star: Abe Vigoda (plays Jack's Godfather Albert Bartell).
27	8	"Georgia on My Mind"	Peter Ellis	Brad Kern	November 4, 1994	14.8
Sloan investigates the murder of a private investigator whose last words are among the very few clues that can solve his death. Guest Stars: Daphne Ashbrook and Kurt Fuller.
28	9	"The Last Laugh: Part 1"	Christian I. Nyby II	Lee Goldberg and William Rabkin	November 11, 1994	14.2
Mark's colleague (Pernell Roberts) is murdered, and his widow is accused of the crime, thrusting him into a personal dilemma. Carey Van Dyke and Dyan Cannon also guest star.
29	10	"The Last Laugh: Part 2"	Christian I. Nyby II	Lee Goldberg and William Rabkin	November 18, 1994	15.5
Upon realizing he's made a terrible mistake, Sloan must clear an innocent man who's been sent to jail for the murder of Dr. Valin (Pernell Roberts). Guest Stars: Stephen Root, Rif Hutton, and Dyan Cannon.
30	11	"Death by Extermination"	Christopher Hibler	Dan Wilcox	December 2, 1994	13.7
Mark and his sister Dora (Betty White) find her real-estate agent murdered in her new home, and Dora is forced to move in with Mark until the murder is solved. Guest Stars: Susan Gibney, Kari Lizer (played Cassie Phillips on Matlock).
31	12	"Standing Eight Count"	Christopher Hibler	Travis Fine	December 9, 1994	13.1
Sloan and his staff investigate the murder of a boxer who had just won a title bout. Suspects include the boxer he defeated, the boxers wife, a disgruntled boxer, and his promoter. Guest Star: Stanley Kamel
32	13	"The Bela Lugosi Blues"	Lee Philips	Michael Gleason	January 6, 1995	15.8
Sloan investigates the murders of three men drained of their blood, including two of the most eligible bachelors in Los Angeles. Guest Star: Julie Carmen
33	14	"The New Healers"	Christopher Hibler	Lee Goldberg and William Rabkin	January 13, 1995	16.2
Sloan gives the police advice when the star of a medical TV series dies during filming at Community General. Guest Stars: Ian Ogilvy, Denise Crosby, and Diedrich Bader.
34	15	"Call Me Incontestible"	Michael Schultz	Dan Wilcox	January 20, 1995	15.4
When Alex Forman, a long-time patient and friend of Mark's, hangs himself, Mark suspects foul play. Alex and two other apparent suicides were customers of the same dating service Perfect Couples, an amazing coincidence. In fact, the police computer said that the odds against it were 64 million to one. What Mark and the others couldn't figure out was how one makes someone hang himself without leaving bruises on the body or drugs showing up in the autopsy. Amanda and Mark send Jack to join Perfect Couples to investigate. When Jack gets there to apply for membership, the flirtatious receptionist, Fawn (Rebecca Chambers), all but asks him out. Jack needs to write a biography, and Amanda and Dolores write it for him. Amanda delivers it to Perfect Couples on her way home, so Jack doesn't see it. They say to Mark that they had always wanted to create Mr. Right. The bio is so effective that 62 women try to date Jack on the first day. Among other things, the bio says that Jack takes 2-hour bubble baths (with his dates) and drinks Armagnac (brandy). Jack is mobbed by women everywhere he goes and says he feels like a Beatle. Renée Coleman stars as Gloria, a beautiful, flirtatious patron of Perfect Couples, whom Jack dates because she dated all three of the "suicides", making her a suspect. Her violently jealous ex-husband, recently released from prison, becomes another suspect, after he attacks Jack.
35	16	"A Blast from the Past"	Burt Brinckerhoff	Joyce Burditt	February 3, 1995	15.7
A paroled murderer whom Steve helped put away stalks Sloan for revenge. He's consistently one step ahead, but his arrogance and aggressive behavior may be his undoing when his fiancée asks for help in escaping his tyrannical reign.
36	17	"Playing for Keeps"	Peter Ellis	Gerry Conway	February 10, 1995	14.2
Sloan investigates the death of a women's volleyball player who was being stalked. Guest Stars: Nancy Everhard, Yvette Nipar, Alex Datcher and Sam Jenkins
37	18	"Sea No Evil"	Christian I. Nyby II	Lee Goldberg and William Rabkin	February 17, 1995	15.3
Gretchen McCord comes back to LA to help defend her nephew a lifeguard who was on duty when a swimmer drowned under mysterious circumstances - and Sloan suspects a larger plot. Guest Star: Holland Taylor as IRS Agent Gretchen McCord.
38	19	"How to Murder Your Lawyer"	Leo Penn	Michael Gleason	February 24, 1995	13.5
Steve is taking a course from a shy lawyer, Arnold Baskin, who is almost run over right after class. Agnes, a paralegal at his firm is also taking the class and picks him up off the ground. Agnes guessed that someone at the firm was reading the case files and selling the names of key witnesses who then end up dead, and she was investigating. The perp thought Arnold was investigating, because Agnes used his name when she accessed files, and so he tried to murder him. Steve and Jack help Agnes and Arnold find the identity of the perp. Guest Stars: Mitchell Whitfield, Leah Remini, Kenneth Mars, and Cliff DeYoung. Note: This episode was intended to be the pilot for a spinoff.
39	20	"Naked Babes"	Christian I. Nyby II	Joyce Burditt	March 31, 1995	13.6
Amanda discovers a black-market baby ring in a maternity home while searching for a friend (Kim Johnston Ulrich) who gave birth to quadruplets. Bo Jackson also guest stars as the creative nanny hired by Jack to look after the babies. Guest Star: Dwight Schultz
40	21	"Death in the Daytime"	Christian I. Nyby II	Michael Gleason	April 28, 1995	11.9
Sloan investigates a series of potentially deadly mishaps plaguing the cast of The Young and the Restless. Special Guest Stars: Lauralee Bell, Eric Braeden, Jeanne Cooper, Doug Davidson, Kristoff St. John, Melody Thomas Scott, and Heather Tom. Guest stars: J. Eddie Peck, Kim Lankford, Jack Kehler, Rainer Grant, Kathryn Cressida, Sherri Paysinger and Mark De Alessandro.
41	22	"My Baby Is Out of This World"	Christopher Hibler	Richard Collins	May 5, 1995	10.4
Sloan probes the death of a rock star whose wife believes he was murdered by an alien who may be their child's biological father. Guest Stars: Jason Carter and Robert Gossett.
