= Diagnosis: Murder season 4 =

Diagnosis: Murder
- Season 4
- No. of episodes: 26

Release
- Original network: CBS
- Original release: September 19, 1996 – May 8, 1997

Season chronology
- ← Previous; Season 3 Next → Season 5

Diagnosis: Murder's fourth season originally aired Thursdays at 8:00–9:00 pm (EST).

This season is notable for establishing Dr. Mark Sloan's friendships with two other popular TV characters: Ben Matlock and Joe Mannix.

The season was released on DVD Complete and in two parts by Visual Entertainment, Inc.

== Cast ==
- Dick Van Dyke as Dr. Mark Sloan
- Victoria Rowell as Dr. Amanda Bentley
- Charlie Schlatter as Dr. Jesse Travis
- Michael Tucci as Norman Briggs
- Barry Van Dyke as Steve Sloan

== Episodes ==
No. overall	No. in season	Title	Directed by	Written by	Original release date	U.S. viewers (millions)
60	1	"Murder by Friendly Fire"	Christian I. Nyby II	Gillian Horvath	September 19, 1996	11.5
A cop colleague of Steve's winds up dead in a tragic friendly-fire incident involving a veteran cop. But could it be that the deadly shooting was premeditated all along? Kim Johnston Ulrich plays the conniving widow. Guest Star: Jonathan Banks. Note: Michael Tucci does not appear in this episode.
61	2	"Murder Can Be Contagious"	Vincent McEveety	Lee Goldberg & William Rabkin	September 26, 1996	12.9
At Dr. Mark’s beach house, Jesse and Mark try to treat a man who has collapsed. Mark diagnoses the man’s illness as smallpox. So, Mark and Jesse must quarantine in place. While investigating, Steve and Dr. Amanda discover that they are dealing with an incredibly fast acting genetically altered strain of smallpox. What’s more, the strain was developed by an LA based science lab for the Department of Defense, but every vial of the virus, and the antigen, have been stolen from the lab. Steve and Amanda only have hours to find the cure before it's too late. And then Jesse starts to get sick… Guest Star: Ken Howard. Note: Michael Tucci does not appear in this episode.
62	3	"Murder on Thin Ice"	Christopher Hibler	Robin Madden	October 3, 1996	12.8
After stage-managing an attack on herself just to win endorsements, a skater kills her accomplice and frames her rival. Guest Stars: Julie Benz, Mark Derwin
63	4	"X Marks the Murder"	Christian I. Nyby II	Lindsay Harrison	October 10, 1996	12.3
64	5	"X Marks the Murder"	Christian I. Nyby II	Lindsay Harrison	October 10, 1996	12.3
In Part 1: A serial killer, who marks his female victims by slicing a bloody ‘X’ into the sole of their foot, calls Community General and asks to speak to Dr. Mark Sloan. The press are calling him the ‘Casanova Killer’ but the LAPD have not revealed his bloody signature of the carved ‘X’. Meanwhile, Norman is worried because the Board of Directors have requested his presence in New York and, despite Mark’s reassurances, he fears the worst. The Casanova Killer, who sees Mark as a worthy adversary – and wants his professional ‘respect’ – starts calling Mark at home. It is revealed that the killer, Michael Dern, works at a Gas Station on the Pacific Coast Highway, and Dr. Mark is one of his regular customers. Dr. Amanda visits the same Gas Station on her way to Mark’s beach house. She has forgotten her purse, but Dern lets her off when she reveals that she is a colleague of ‘Doc Sloan’s’. Norman explains that the Board are very impressed with his work at CGH and want him to become a global decision maker regarding their many charitable gifts. Increasingly frustrated with Mark’s lack of respect for him, the killer decides that Amanda will be his next victim… In Part 2: After Michael Dern’s statement that the supposed sixth victim of the Casanova Killer was a woman he’d never even heard of, he is found murdered in his prison cell. At first, Mark assumes that victim ‘No. 6’ may have been murdered by a copycat killer. But the sixth victim also had the bloody ‘X’ carved into the sole of her foot, a detail that was never released by the police. How could a copycat have known that crucial detail? Steve pursues Bobby Scott, who shared the same cell with Dern – and is the only suspect in Dern’s murder. Steve finds Scott dead in an alley. Later we learn Scott died of an overdose of chemically pure heroin. Meanwhile, Norman’s new jet-setting role as a ruthless global decision maker for the Trust, starts to get too much for him. Mark starts to realise that that the unique ‘M.O.’ of the Casanova Killer has been used to camouflage the unrelated murder of victim ‘No. 6’ by an individual who knew all the intimate details of the Casanova Killer’s case - right down to a forensic level… Guest Stars: Gregory Itzin, Kurt Fuller and John Schneider.
65	6	"A Model Murder"	Vincent McEveety	Sam Egan	October 17, 1996	11.8
Sloan and Steve investigate a fashion show when they suspect a modeling agent of being a serial killer who murdered a private eye that discovered her secret, and her next target is one of Jesse's college buddies. Guest Stars: Lesley-Anne Down, Jessica Collins, and Jason Clarke
66	7	"Murder Can Be Murder"	Christian I. Nyby II	Tom Chehak	October 24, 1996	11.5
A respected Cardiologist (Alan Rachins) and two business partners, concoct a devious insurance scam to murder a man and pass him off as one of them. But when the partner who was supposed to be dead gets cold feet, he is murdered for real. Meanwhile, Mark adopts a basset hound belonging to one of Jesse's deceased relatives, as the others try to find a home for it. Guest Stars: Alan Rachins, Josh Taylor, and Stephen Lee.
67	8	"An Explosive Murder"	Steve Miner	Dean Hargrove	October 31, 1996	12.2
An ambitious female cop goes undercover tracking a terrorist (Eric McCormack) who blew up a delivery truck and killed the driver, injuring Mark in the process. The terrorist then orders a hit on Mark. Note: Michael Tucci does not appear in this episode.
68	9	"Murder by the Busload"	Christian I. Nyby II	Lee Goldberg & William Rabkin	November 7, 1996	13.0
Steve Sloan has prime tickets for an LA Lakers basketball game and is eager for his dad, Mark, to wrap up his shift and join him for the game. Just then, multiple casualties from a serious bus crash, start arriving at Community General. Mark promises Steve that he will join him as soon as possible. One casualty, Fred Talisker is triaged as ‘Dead on Arrival’ despite the best efforts of Paramedic Tanya Wells. In between her shifts Tanya is studying for the Medical School entrance exam – and it is clear that Dr. Jesse is attracted to her. Later, Dr. Amanda determines that Talisker died from a blow to the back of the head - and not the crash. Mark calls in Steve to report the suspected murder. One of the bus crash victims, Sara, reveals that there have been a number of rapes on the UCLA campus, and that’s why she started taking the bus. Steve retraces Talisker’s steps prior to his death. His pattern of behaviour strikes Steve as suspicious. Mark deduces that Talisker’s behaviour makes perfect sense if he was the rapist and was stalking his next intended victim when he boarded the bus. Then, another crash victim, Lou, a homeless Vietnam veteran, is murdered in his hospital bed. Lou’s murder must be connected in some way, but how? After the grim revelation of the murderer’s true identity, the episode ends on a comical note. Coach Del Harris of the Lakers, delivers two complimentary tickets to Amanda at the reception desk. Believing they're fakes, Amanda tears them up! Steve and Mark call out as the Coach is leaving and Amanda desperately grabs adhesive tape in an effort to repair the (clearly genuine) tickets. Guest Stars: Richard Riehle, Nancy Youngblut, Del Harris (as himself) and Kathy Evison. This was the first of three guest appearances Kathy Evison made on ‘DM’.
69	10	"A Candidate for Murder"	Christopher Hibler	Steve Hattman	November 14, 1996	14.4
The drug-addicted daughter of U.S. Senator Terence Bell is apparently killed in the Senator’s hotel suite in downtown Los Angeles. The Senator’s senior aide, the machiavellian Peter Trent who is only concerned with the possible repercussions for the Senator’s re-election campaign, attempts to make the incident look like an overdose. Later, when the autopsy reveals fundamental inconsistencies, Dr. Mark and Steve discover just how far Trent is prepared to go in order to protect the Senator's career – and his own. Guest Stars: Michael Cole, and John Rubinstein.
70	11	"The ABCs of Murder"	Christian I. Nyby II	Steve Hattman	November 21, 1996	12.6
Dr. Mark Sloan helps a tough district attorney (Piper Laurie) probe a drive-by shooting at a high school which left a popular teacher dead. But her stubborn insistence that a Korean teen is responsible makes finding the real killer a challenge. Note: Michael Tucci does not appear in this episode.
71	12	"Murder in the Family"	Vincent McEveety	Lindsay Harrison	December 12, 1996	12.5
This is a ‘DM’ Christmas episode. Even though there are plenty of Christmas trees on display, the storyline, initially at least, seems rather sad and grim, and it takes a little while for the Christmas associated themes to emerge. After many years, Mark's daughter, Carol Hilton (Dick Van Dyke’s real-life daughter, Stacy Van Dyke) comes home for Christmas in an attempt to escape the wrath of her abusive trucker husband, Bruce. She plans to file for divorce and move out of state for a new job. But, before she can put her plan into action, Bruce is found murdered. Unbeknownst to Carol, Bruce's actual job was illegally dumping toxic waste and blackmail, and she's likely the next target of his crooked associates. The first standout element in this story is the imperfect, but very believable, relationship between Carol and Steve, her brother. Steve has always been overly protective of Carol, and he detested Bruce. One gets the impression that Carol may even have married Bruce in an impulsive attempt to escape Steve’s rather suffocating over-protection. When Steve is seriously injured and brought into Community General as a patient, a very moving bedside rapprochement takes place between brother and sister. The themes of love and forgiveness here make perfect sense in the context of a Christmas episode. But the epilog of this episode is the real joy. Stacy Van Dyke delivers a brilliant rendition of ‘Have yourself a merry little Christmas’ while the regular cast goof around and decorate the Christmas tree in Dr. Mark’s beach house. At the end, the regular cast, plus Stacy, all break the fourth wall and look straight into the camera to wish the audience, at home, a very ‘Merry Christmas’. Guest Stars: Stacy Van Dyke (plays Carol Sloan Hilton), Anne Lockhart, John Capodice and Wanda De Jesus.
72	13	"In Defense of Murder"	Vincent McEveety	Joyce Burditt & Gerry Conway	January 9, 1997	13.61
The head pediatric nurse at Community General turns out to be a former prostitute whose one-time madam is murdered after declaring her intention to publish a tell-all book. The suspect nurse is defended by the lawyer (and murderer) Darren Worthy (David Dukes), who is trying to exploit the case for his own personal gain.
73	14	"A History of Murder"	Christian I. Nyby II	Gerry Conway	January 16, 1997	14.12
As a major new Cardiac facility is about to begin construction at Community General, Norman Briggs’ ceremonial hammer blow reveals a decades old skeleton entombed behind a wall. The skeleton is that of Dr. Gregory Nordoff who had been a pioneering heart surgeon and the young Mark Sloan’s one-time mentor. In a series of black and white flashbacks, we see that Dr. Nordoff had gone missing on November 22, 1963 – the same day that President Kennedy was assassinated. Everyone had assumed that Dr. Nordoff was responsible for the theft of missing hospital funds and had run away. Now, with the discovery of Nordoff’s murder, everyone, especially Mark, starts to re-examine the events of 30 years earlier. Incredibly, Dr. Raymond Huxley who had been Nordoff’s protégé back in the day, suffers a massive heart attack and expires just hours after the discovery of Nordoff’s remains. Then, the veteran nurse, turned administrator, who had worked with both men, is found violently murdered in the parking garage. Mark has to navigate personal memories, both nostalgic and heartbreaking, to uncover the tragic secrets that lie behind the sequence of related deaths that extend over more than three decades. Guest Stars: Nicholas Pryor, Tricia O'Neil, James Sloyan and David Purdham.
74	15	"Murder Two: Part 1"	Christopher Hibler	Gerald Sanoff & Joel Steiger	January 30, 1997	15.73
Dr. Mark Sloan enlists his old friend, Ben Matlock (Andy Griffith), to defend Dr. Jesse who is accused of murdering a colleague, Dr. Eric Spindler, a Resident at Community General. Guest Stars: Mark Kiely, Susan Diol and Lee Chamberlin. Note: Michael Tucci does not appear in this episode.
75	16	"Murder Two: Part 2"	Christopher Hibler	Gerald Sanoff & Joel Steiger	February 6, 1997	15.63
With Jesse falsely accused of murdering Eric Spindler, Ben Matlock (Andy Griffith) gathers all the evidence to find the real killer. Guest Star: H. Richard Greene. Note: This was Andy Griffith's final appearance as Attorney Ben Matlock. Note: Michael Tucci does not appear in this episode.
76	17	"Hard-Boiled Murder"	Christian I. Nyby II	Lee Goldberg & William Rabkin	February 13, 1997	15.16
Dr. Sloan assists veteran Private Investigator Joe Mannix (Mike Connors) with an unsolved murder case from 1973. Note: This episode serves as a sequel to the Mannix episode "Little Girl Lost". Guest Stars: Richard Gant, Julie Adams, Pernell Roberts, and Beverly Garland. Note: Michael Tucci does not appear in this episode.
77	18	"Murder, Country Style"	Christopher Hibler	Story by : Lee Goldberg & William Rabkin and Gerry Conway; Teleplay by : Gerry Conway	February 20, 1997	14.93
The prime suspects in the murder of a country star are a driven TV producer and her timid songwriter daughter. Guest Stars: Deanne Bray, Barbara Mandrell, Billy Ray Cyrus, Terri Clark, Linda Davis, Billy Dean, Joe Diffie, Eddie Rabbitt, and Reba McEntire. Note: Michael Tucci does not appear in this episode.
78	19	"Delusions of Murder"	Christopher Hibler	Michael Berlin & Eric Estrin	February 27, 1997	14.10
Psychiatrist Gavin Reed (Dwight Schultz) kills his estranged wife Claire (Teri Austin) and tries to frame a patient. But Mark and Amanda suspect otherwise and they soon learn Reed has sinister motives with his patients. Guest Star: Dwight Schultz. Note: Michael Tucci does not appear in this episode.
79	20	"A Passion for Murder"	Christian I. Nyby II	Lee Goldberg & William Rabkin	April 3, 1997	12.42
A sexy, but sinister, pharmaceutical rep has every intention of winning the hospital's new chief of staff's heart.
80	21	"Blood Brothers Murder"	Christian I. Nyby II	Barry Van Dyke & Jeffrey Glasser	April 10, 1997	12.24
A beach boy is suspected of killing his girlfriend's brother – a gang member. Guest Stars: Carey Van Dyke and Shane Van Dyke. Note: Michael Tucci does not appear in this episode.
81	22	"Physician, Murder Thyself"	Christian I. Nyby II	Story by : Gerry Conway and Lee Goldberg & William Rabkin; Teleplay by : Gerry Conway	April 24, 1997	13.33
A surgeon drops dead while operating on another doctor. Guest Stars: Jack Klugman (plays Dr. Jeff Everden), Chad Everett, Wayne Rogers and Bernie Kopell
82	23	"Murder in the Air"	Tom Chehak	Tom Chehak	April 24, 1997	13.09
The pilot of an airliner escorting Sloan and Amanda to a medical conference in Europe, is killed.
83	24	"The Merry Widow Murder"	Oz Scott	Joyce Burditt	May 1, 1997	12.20
A wealthy woman, Claire Whitfield (Brynn Thayer) and her lover cook up an elaborate plot to bump off her husband, Elliott (Wayne Tippit) and frame Mark. Brynn Thayer plays Leanne Macintyre on Matlock. Note: Charlie Schlatter and Michael Tucci do not appear in this episode.
84	25	"Comedy Is Murder"	Christopher Hibler	Story by : Dick Van Dyke & Lee Goldberg & William Rabkin; Teleplay by : Lee Goldberg & William Rabkin	May 8, 1997	12.62
A washed up comedian stumbles in his attempts to murder his more successful partner, whose ex-wife ends up dead in the pool. But evidence soon suggests he might not be responsible. Guest Stars: Harvey Korman, Tim Conway (plays Tim Conrad), and Tom Gallop (plays Phil Zarkin). Note: Michael Tucci does not appear in this episode.
85	26	"The Murder of Mark Sloan"	Christopher Hibler	Steve Hattman	May 8, 1997	14.16
A mad bomber whom Sloan helped put away breaks out of prison bent on revenge, but Mark discovers the bomber was not responsible for all attempts on his life. Guest Stars: Carol Bruce, and Mary Kay Adams. Note: This marks the final appearance of Michael Tucci as Norman Briggs.
