= Diagnosis: Murder season 3 =

Diagnosis: Murder
- Season 3
- No. of episodes: 18

Release
- Original network: CBS
- Original release: December 8, 1995 – May 3, 1996

Season chronology
- ← Previous; Season 2 Next → Season 4

Diagnosis: Murder's third season originally aired Fridays at 9:00-10:00 pm (EST). The season was released on DVD by Paramount Home Video.

== Cast ==
- Dick Van Dyke as Dr. Mark Sloan
- Victoria Rowell as Dr. Amanda Bentley
- Charlie Schlatter as Dr. Jesse Travis
- Michael Tucci as Norman Briggs
- Barry Van Dyke as Steve Sloan

== Episodes ==
| No. overall | No. in season | Title | Directed by | Written by | Original release date | U.S. viewers (millions) |
|---|---|---|---|---|---|---|
| 42 | 1 | "An Innocent Murder" | Vincent McEveety | Cynthia Deming & William Royce | December 8, 1995 | 13.0 |
A young lady murders her rich father (Arthur Taxier) and makes it look like a suicide, but Sloan manages to find holes in her story.
| 43 | 2 | "Witness to Murder" | Paris Barclay | Story by : Mimi Rothman Schapiro & Bill Wells; Teleplay by : Cynthia Deming & William Royce | December 15, 1995 | 12.3 |
Sloan tries to help a girl who witnessed her father's murder and is afraid to tell anyone.
| 44 | 3 | "All-American Murder" | Christian I. Nyby II | Tom Chehak | December 22, 1995 | 12.2 |
The results of an autopsy on a deceased newcomer to the beach bring a surprising twist to the person's death. Guest Stars: Curtis Armstrong and Leo Penn.
| 45 | 4 | "Murder in the Courthouse" | Bruce Kessler | Roger Lowenstein | December 29, 1995 | 11.9 |
Mark serves jury duty on a case in which a notorious hit man is found innocent - only to be killed by a bomb that the prosecutor planted for revenge. Mark's effort to prove the prosecutor did uncovers surprising details about her life and the hitman's. Guest Stars: Dixie Carter, James Hong, and Brian Tochi.
| 46 | 5 | "Murder on the Run: Part 1" | Christian I. Nyby II | Story by : Maurice Hurley & Steve Hattman; Teleplay by : Steve Hattman | January 5, 1996 | 13.4 |
A man falsely convicted of killing his wife takes Mark hostage in order to prove his innocence. (A train transporting prisoners derails, sending him to the hospital--partly inspired by The Fugitive.) Guest Stars: Jeff Allin, Dion Anderson, Richard Fancy, and Denise Crosby.
| 47 | 6 | "Murder on the Run: Part 2" | Christian I. Nyby II | Story by : Maurice Hurley & Steve Hattman; Teleplay by : Steve Hattman | January 12, 1996 | 13.0 |
Sloan becomes convinced that George Karn (Jeff Allin) is innocent, so he sets out to find the man who killed Karn's wife. But a hardened police officer constantly impedes his efforts. Guest Stars: Denise Crosby, Richard Fancy, and Dion Anderson.
| 48 | 7 | "Love Is Murder" | Tom Chehak | Nan Hagan | January 19, 1996 | 14.0 |
Steve becomes attracted to a female reporter who murders cops. Guest Star: Rebeccah Bush
| 49 | 8 | "Misdiagnosis Murder" | Christian I. Nyby II | Gerry Conway | January 26, 1996 | 12.4 |
Dr. Jesse gets involved in a large conspiracy when he sees an alleged heart-attack victim, while a wealthy benefactor takes a shine to Briggs. Guest Stars: Richard Romanus.
| 50 | 9 | "The Pressure to Murder" | Christopher Hibler | Sibyl Gardner | February 9, 1996 | 12.2 |
Sloan investigates the death of Amanda's cousin Troy, a rugby player and medical intern. Mark quickly determines it was murder but now must figure out why. The key is ABADCAD, in more ways than one.
| 51 | 10 | "Living on the Streets Can Be Murder" | Christopher Hibler | Carey W. Hayes & Chad Hayes | February 16, 1996 | 13.2 |
Someone is murdering homeless people and harvesting their organs for transplants, so Mark poses as a vagrant to flush them out. Guest Stars: Bryan Cranston
| 52 | 11 | "Murder, Murder" | Peter Ellis | Nancy Bond | February 23, 1996 | 12.2 |
Sloan faces double trouble while investigating the murders of an old friend (Robert Vaughn) and his young wife (Ruth McGinnis), the prime suspect being the friend's sister-in-law (also McGinnis), his wife's identical twin. Guest Stars: Alan Fudge and Jack McGee.
| 53 | 12 | "Murder in the Dark" | Bernard L. Kowalski | Joyce Burditt | March 8, 1996 | 11.4 |
Dr. John Foster, a pioneering New York surgeon, arrives at Community General Hospital to perform an abdominal aortic procedure on a wealthy patient. The night before the surgery, Dr. Mark is concerned to note that Dr. John is drinking rather heavily. Dr. John turns up for the surgery in an intoxicated state and is ordered out of the OR by Dr. Claire Hartman who then performs the surgery. He then goes on a bender and later arrives at Dr. Claire’s apartment and has a furious row with her. Dr. Claire is found dead the next morning. Mark diagnoses that John is a full-blown alcoholic and furthermore John has no memory of going to Dr. Claire’s apartment – or much of anything else, from the night before. But might Dr. Claire’s fast and loose private life hold the real key to her murder? Look out for the bartender who Jesse speaks to at the Whirlwind Club. He is played by Kevin McNally, Dick Van Dyke’s real-life son in law and, in later seasons, the recurring character of Will Sanders a Fire Department Paramedic, who frequently wheels patients into the CGH Reception area while summarising the patient’s injuries for the medical staff. Guest Star: John Pleshette, Kevin McNally
| 54 | 13 | "35 Millimeter Murder" | Bruce Seth Green | Steve Hattman | March 29, 1996 | 12.5 |
A picture taken by a paparazzo provides a clue in a kidnapping and murder case, while Amanda goes into labor. Guest Stars: Stephen Furst and Cylk Cozart.
| 55 | 14 | "The Murder Trade" | Oz Scott | Joyce Burditt | April 5, 1996 | 13.0 |
A Psychotherapist murders a downsizing expert who threatened Mark Sloan's job, then attempts to blackmail the doctor into returning the favor. Guest Stars: Leila Kenzle and Terry O'Quinn.
| 56 | 15 | "Mind Over Murder" | Christian I. Nyby II | Gerry Conway | April 12, 1996 | 11.8 |
A psychic from an infomercial claims she saw a future murder being committed. Guest Stars: George Hamilton and Tracy Nelson
| 57 | 16 | "Murder by the Book" | Christopher Hibler | Tom Chehak & Steve Hattman | April 19, 1996 | 11.6 |
Call girls and the co-author of their racy book, ‘Munchies, Snacks and Spreads’, are being threatened with murder, while Dr. Amanda discovers she was never legally married. Guest Stars: Troy Evans, Tony Pierce, Jeri Lynn Ryan and Rick Dees (as himself).
| 58 | 17 | "FMurder" | Christian I. Nyby II | Story by : Gerry Conway & Steve Hattman; Teleplay by : Gerry Conway | April 26, 1996 | 12.0 |
Sloan suspects a TV homemaker (Vicki Lawrence) murdered a perverted radio host (Morton Downey Jr.) who got her pregnant. Guest Star: Kene Holliday (played Tyler Hudson on Matlock)
| 59 | 18 | "Left-Handed Murder" | Jonathan Frakes | Mark Masuoka | May 3, 1996 | 11.7 |
The remains of Sloan's friend are found in a dead shark, which is made all the more suspicious when it's discovered the victim had three wives. Curio: In this episode, Dr. Amanda is very clearly pregnant. So, sequentially, the events of this episode must have taken place prior to those in episode 13 (‘35 Millimetre Murder’) when Dr. Amanda gave birth – with Dr. Jesse’s assistance. Guest Star: Tim Choate, Christina Pickles.
