= Diagnosis: Murder season 6 =

Diagnosis: Murder
- Season 6
- No. of episodes: 22

Release
- Original network: CBS
- Original release: September 24, 1998 – May 13, 1999

Season chronology
- ← Previous; Season 5 Next → Season 7

Diagnosis: Murder's sixth season originally aired Thursdays at 9:00–10:00 p.m. (ET/PT) on CBS. The season was released on DVD complete and available in two parts by Visual Entertainment, Inc.

== Cast ==
- Dick Van Dyke as Dr. Mark Sloan
- Victoria Rowell as Dr. Amanda Bentley
- Charlie Schlatter as Dr. Jesse Travis
- Barry Van Dyke as Lieutenant Steve Sloan

== Episodes ==
| No. overall | No. in season | Title | Directed by | Written by | Original release date | U.S. viewers (millions) |
|---|---|---|---|---|---|---|
| 111 | 1 | "Resurrection" | Christian I. Nyby II | Lee Goldberg & William Rabkin | September 24, 1998 | 13.15 |
| 112 | 2 | "Resurrection" | Christian I. Nyby II | Lee Goldberg & William Rabkin | September 24, 1998 | 13.15 |
In the finale of the previous season, Caitlin Sweeney succeeded in bombing Community General and a number of characters are now trapped in the rubble. A concussed Mark works hard to save Amanda's life. Some 4 months later, as the hospital starts to reopen, FBI Agent Ron Wagner reveals that Caitlin has started robbing banks to raise money for R.O.A.R.: Revolutionary Order for Armed Rebellion. Steve and Jesse discuss plans to buy Barbecue Bob's, which is going out of business. Later, Steve and Jesse ask Mark for a loan to buy the restaurant. Caitlin and R.O.A.R. successfully intercept a police convoy that was transporting Carter Sweeney. The Sweeneys then kidnap Mark from his home. They demand Mark figure out a way to obtain $100 million or they will keep blowing up stores and restaurants, thereby killing many innocent people. Mark agrees and comes up with an ingenious plan that works, involving a fake armored car. Guest Stars: Harry J. Lennix (plays F.B.I. Agent Ron Wagner), Arye Gross (plays Carter Sweeney), Kim Little (plays nurse Susan Hilliard, Jesse's girlfriend), and Stephanie Niznik (plays Caitlin Sweeney).
| 113 | 3 | "Till Death Do Us Part" | Max Tash | Terence Winter | October 1, 1998 | 15.42 |
A couple-to-be, Philip and Cindy, discuss their plans for patricide. Later, the events of the wedding day unfold. Wayde Garrett (Patrick Duffy) is the wealthy father of the homicidal bride. The couple's plan is to kill Wayde, by poisoning, and leave sufficient (planted) evidence for Mark and Steve to conclude that Wade's younger wife, Denise, was the murderer. It all seems like the perfect crime. We then see the couple agreeing that their plan is perfect and simply cannot go wrong on the day of the wedding - which hasn't actually taken place yet. Next, we see the actual events of the wedding day play out. Wayde still dies of poisoning but everything else that was so meticulously planned never quite goes to plan. Mark and Steve reach the logical conclusion that Denise was the murderer, but somehow it all seems just too neat to be true and Mark is suspicious. Guest Stars: Patrick Duffy, Staci Keanan, Stacey Travis
| 114 | 4 | "Wrong Number" | Christian I. Nyby II | James L. Novack | October 8, 1998 | 12.26 |
Dr. Mark Sloan is alerted to the abduction of a child when the kidnapper dials the doctor's number by mistake. Mark's attempts to help Steve locate the kidnapper turn to tragedy when the victim's father is shot and killed while he is attempting to deliver the ransom money. The FBI become involved and Steve learns that the Agent in charge is a female who he met, and became very close to, at a Training Seminar in Florida. Later, Steve is given a classic phone booth to phone booth runaround by the kidnapper when he makes a second attempt to deliver the ransom. But things don't add up in this case. Could it be that the kidnapper and the murderer are entirely different people? Guest Stars: Eva LaRue, Kathy Evison
| 115 | 5 | "Blood Will Out" | Christopher Hibler | Robin Bernheim | October 15, 1998 | 14.34 |
A supposedly dead man, a survivor of a mass shooting at a restaurant, escapes from Dr. Amanda's Pathology Lab and terrorizes Community General. However, during their search for the man, our gang learn some dark secrets. This episode takes place during the course of a single night shift at Community General. Guest Stars: Bryan Cranston, Daniel Riordan, Kim Little (plays Nurse Susan Hilliard)
| 116 | 6 | "Alienated" | Bruce Seth Green | J. Larry Carroll & David Bennett Carren | October 29, 1998 | 14.22 |
Jesse is apparently abducted by aliens. But his efforts to prove it are fruitless. However Mark soon suspects that Jesse's supposed abduction might be a cover up for something sinister. Note: This episode features several actors from the Star Trek franchise – Walter Koenig, George Takei, Wil Wheaton, Majel Barrett and Grace Whitney
| 117 | 7 | "Write, She Murdered" | Frank Thackery | Jacquelyn Blain | November 5, 1998 | 13.48 |
A mystery novelist who is suffering from writer's block, murders her literary agent, hoping the investigation into his murder will inspire her next book. Guest Stars: Shelley Long, Adam West and Richard Herd. Note: Victoria Rowell also plays the author's fictional heroine Danielle Slade.
| 118 | 8 | "Rear Windows '98" | Vincent McEveety | Jacquelyn Blain | November 12, 1998 | 14.20 |
Dr. Amanda is surfing the web when she witnesses a real-time webcam murder online. Horrified by what she has seen, Amanda becomes obsessed with identifying the female murder victim in the hope that she can find her killer. Amanda's credit card is then refused at BBQ Bobs. Incredibly, the killer has identified Amanda and is set on destroying her online life. Three hacker friends of Dr. Jesse's help Amanda fight back against her persecutor. But the killer, who is clearly a very capable computer whiz, always manages to stay one step ahead. Mark then makes a breakthrough and realises that they are actually dealing with a serial killer who has murdered people all over the country. Guest Stars: Kim Little (plays Nurse Susan Hilliard), Jennifer Ringley (plays the first victim as a fictionalized version of herself).
| 119 | 9 | "The Last Resort" | Christian I. Nyby II | Paul Bishop | November 19, 1998 | 13.08 |
Steve joins his troubled partner, Detective Reggie Ackroyd (Joe Penny) in a rehab unit for stressed-out cops. Reggie seems delusional and keeps blaming a murderer he caught for abducting his wife and daughter, and Steve indulges him. Mark is puzzled by Steve's apparent deep-seated resentment towards him. Reggie and Steve trick Mark, tie him up and escape in order to return to the scene of the abduction. Reggie and Steve succeed in finding the bodies of Reggie's missing wife and daughter by following the voices in Reggie's head. Guest Stars: Susan Gibney (plays Det. Tanis Archer in 7 episodes), Reginald Vel Johnson, and Martin Kove (plays Captain Newman), Greg Grunberg
| 120 | 10 | "Murder x 4" | Frank Thackery | J. Larry Carroll & David Bennett Carren | December 3, 1998 | 12.94 |
Three apparently senseless murders; the killers are caught but for various reasons don't talk. The police and doctors look for a common thread and find it. The perps are all terminally ill patients; but who is hiring them? How do they get paid? They try to intercept the fourth would-be murderer. Guest Stars: Richard Biggs, George Lazenby
| 121 | 11 | "Dead in the Water" | Neema Barnette | Robin Bernheim | December 17, 1998 | 12.70 |
On their way to Carmel for their long planned romantic getaway, Jesse and Susan's car breaks down near the small coastal town of Sea Ridge. Susan is stunned when she spots her former fiancė, Greg Hutchens, who supposedly died in a car accident years earlier – an accident in which Susan was the driver. It emerges that Greg is very much alive but allowed Susan to believe she had been responsible for the accident and his death. Jesse contacts Mark to relate the bizarre story. Intrigued, Mark, Amanda and Steve start researching Greg's 'fatal' accident and his record as a professional diver. Jesse and Susan seek out Greg to get some real answers but find only his dead body. They are immediately arrested by Sheriff Kelso and charged with murder. And 'justice' in Sea Ridge is worryingly swift. Guest Stars: Monte Markham, Laurence Lau and Kim Little (played Nurse Susan Hilliard).
| 122 | 12 | "Trapped in Paradise" | Bruce Seth Green | Ernie Wallengren | January 7, 1999 | 15.90 |
After a second murder without any apparent motive, occurs at the exclusive Hill Ridge Estates gated community, Steve, going undercover as the estranged brother of the latest victim, moves into the deceased's house posing as a physician from Community General. Upon arrival, he finds that Shelby Turner, an investigative reporter from a tabloid obsessed with space aliens, has already loudly introduced herself as his wife. After throwing a housewarming gets them fingerprints which match to dead people, Mark pieces together what the three victims had in common with each-other and the true nature of Hill Ridge Estates starts to emerge. Guest Stars: Martin Kove, Jay Acovone, Shawn Huff
| 123 | 13 | "Voices Carry" | Christopher Hibler | Lee Goldberg & William Rabkin | January 21, 1999 | 13.31 |
A retiring detective Harry Trumble (Jack Klugman) continues to pursue a serial killer known as "The Clown Killer", and will lie, cheat and even kill to do it. Guest Stars: Jack Klugman (played Quincy on the TV Series Quincy M.E.), Martin Kove
| 124 | 14 | "Murder, My Suite" | Jim Johnston | Story by : Lee Goldberg & William Rabkin; Teleplay by : E.F. Wallengren | January 28, 1999 | 13.80 |
A cool, calm and ruthless brunette, Ariel, is about to inject her accomplice, Alex, with a hypodermic. When Alex states that he's going to need a larger 'cut' for his trouble, Ariel switches vials and injects him with the contents of the other vial, which she then casts aside. At Community General, Dr. Amanda reveals that she is this years' recipient of the MESSI award, the premiere award for Forensics experts. Mark, Amanda and Jesse decide to celebrate with lunch at a fancy restaurant where they bump into Dr. Herb Downey a top man in infectious disease. Just moments later, Alex stumbles in and collapses onto a nearby table surrounded by diners. The four doctors quickly investigate. In Alex's room they discover the empty vial that Ariel had thrown away. The label reveals that it contained Legionella bacteria, thus they have a major outbreak of legionnaires disease on their hands. This necessitates an immediate quarantine of the premises. Mark's first assumption is that this is probably terrorism. Steve alerts the Center for Disease Control, but it will be several hours before they can deliver the antigen. The four doctors set up an improvised emergency ward as, one by one, the guests start to fall seriously ill – including Amanda. Guest Stars: Francois Giroday, Dara Tomanovich
| 125 | 15 | "Murder on the Hour" | Christopher Hibler | J. Larry Carroll & David Bennett Carren | February 4, 1999 | 12.13 |
This episode starts with a point-of-view camera shot that is strongly reminiscent of Twin Peaks. The unknown individual whose p.o.v. we are sharing, clearly knows their way around Community General Hospital. They enter a patient's room and proceed to cold bloodedly murder the patient and then attempt to cover their tracks. We can see on the bedside clock that the time is exactly 6:00pm. A couple of hours later, a somewhat shocked Steve Sloan accompanies the body of an armed robber he had to shoot, into the ER. After Mark and Jesse manage to save the patient, Dr. Jesse, infuriated at the failure of Dr. Mason, the other on-call ER resident, to respond to any of her multiple pages, goes searching for her and discovers her dead body in the On-call room. She has been dead for approximately an hour. Dr. Amanda reports to a perplexed Mark, that the patient who we (the audience) saw at 6:00pm, was in fact, murdered. Shortly afterwards, a panicked male Orderly reports the discovery of the body of another dead patient in a stairwell. Reasoning backwards, Mark, Amanda, Jesse and Steve realise the chilling truth that there is a serial killer operating inside Community General. And, what's more, they are committing a murder every hour, on the hour. Guest Stars: Beverly Leech, Jason Hildebrandt
| 126 | 16 | "Rescue Me" | William Rabkin | Jacquelyn Blain | February 11, 1999 | 12.00 |
Dr. Jesse is out shopping when he hears the sound of a car crash. Rushing to help, he manages to extricate the driver, a young woman, from the wrecked vehicle via the already open passenger side door. Later at Community General, Jesse checks on his new patient and it is apparent that there is an attraction between them. The woman, Chloe Marsden, is a professional artist - with a focus on romantic subjects. Later, she shows up at Jesse's apartment with a disturbing story of her ex, Richard Locke, having turned up at her house and jealously wrecked it. Jesse feels that he has to let her stay the night. But he is embarrassed the next morning when Susan arrives with breakfast and discovers Chloe in the apartment. The increasingly disturbing topics of obsession and manipulation in this episode are leavened by two scenes of Mark performing joyously as part of a talented barber shop quartet and his comic encounters with the rather terrifying new head of Nursing Services who has the ability to reduce grown men to tears. Guest Stars: Kim Little (plays Nurse Susan Hilliard), Audie England, Matt Battaglia
| 127 | 17 | "Down Among the Dead Men" | Barry Steinberg | Paul Bishop | February 18, 1999 | 12.53 |
Doctors Mark, Amanda and Jesse are at BBQ Bob's discussing the pros and cons of hosting a musical benefit there when Steve enters holding a note that was left on his windshield. The printed note quotes the California Penal Code for armed robbery and is signed 'KMIYC'. Just then, automatic weapons fire erupts outside, and BBQ Bob's windows are raked with gunfire. Incredibly, the very crime referred to in Steve's note is happening at the Jewelers store just across the lot from the restaurant, and there are plenty of casualties for Mark, Amanda and Jesse to tend to. After a strange conversational encounter between Steve and the leader of the armed robbers, the surviving robbers escape, discarding the proceeds of their crime in the process. The next day, Steve receives a new note quoting another California Penal Code felony crime. The deadly campaign of the strangely twitching 'KMIYC' is clearly not over. Guest Stars: Susan Gibney (plays Detective Tanis Archer) and Travis Tritt.
| 128 | 18 | "Never Say Die" | Frank Thackery | Barry Van Dyke | February 25, 1999 | 12.92 |
A juvenile delinquent, Tommy Anders (Shane Van Dyke), is assigned community-service time at a boxing gym, where the death of a twitchy young fighter quickly arouses suspicion. He ran in front of a bus to demonstrate that he was indestructible. (If some of the other delinquents at the gym resemble Tommy, it's no accident, because there are other Van Dyke kids there.) Later, after a sparring session with Steve, Tommy realizes that he is blind. Steve blames himself unconditionally but Mark reserves judgement suspecting some other element at the gym to be the cause of the strange effects upon the boxers there. Other Guest Stars: Carey Van Dyke, Wes Van Dyke, and Taryn Van Dyke.
| 129 | 19 | "Trash TV" | Ron Satlof | Lee Goldberg (part 1); David Bennett Carren & J. Larry Carroll (part 2) | April 29, 1999 | 9.86 |
| 130 | 20 | "Trash TV" | Ron Satlof | Lee Goldberg (part 1); David Bennett Carren & J. Larry Carroll (part 2) | April 29, 1999 | 9.86 |
An unusual patient at Community General is the "Masked Magician", who reveals magic tricks in highly rated specials on Pox TV, but gets wounded by a real arrow due to sabotage. Meanwhile, rival channel GBS prepares a series "Doctor Danger", supposedly based on Dr. Mark Sloan, but when shown the pilot he refuses to have anything to do with this mockery; Jesse however agrees to write scripts for it. Shortly after, both the masked magician -who unveiled himself to become irreplaceable- and Mark's character 'Dr. Danger', are murdered. Mark tricks the first killer, but accepts that motive doesn't hold true for the first, so a second murderer must still be out there. While Kent Beudine presents a cynical show on the horror gripping Hollywood after two TV celebrity murders, Mark is convinced Jesse is on the right track for motive by remarking it all upsets the program line-ups of rival networks in terms of the almighty ratings. Producer Jackson Burley is ignored even by his former protégés, and minutes after star Jerry Lane turns down an offer to transfer to West Coast VP Garth Zand's network GBS, the winner on Thursday after the previous crimes, he is run over by a fake parking valet. After Zand invites Mark for a scary gourmet dinner, featuring the potentially fatal Japanese blowfish, his luck changes: he finds himself in Community General as a patient and all GBS executives refuse his calls, after Lane exposes him he literally fears for an assassin and switches his patient file with his roommate's. Guest Stars: Gary Sandy, Stephen J. Cannell (plays Jackson Burley and "Dr. Mark Sloane" in the third pilot in the episode), Dan Gilvezan (plays Kent Beudine), Randolph Mantooth, Ian Ogilvy, Robert Ito (plays Sam on Quincy M.E.), and Billy Warlock (plays "Dr. Mark Sloane" in the second pilot in the episode).
| 131 | 21 | "Blood Ties" | Bruce Seth Green | Lee Goldberg & William Rabkin | May 6, 1999 | 10.98 |
Background: DM Producer, Fred Silverman, intended that every season of Diagnosis: Murder should include an episode that would serve as a familiar presentational wrapper for a television pilot. These episodes were known as backdoor pilots. For the most part, these episodes were well camouflaged as regular episodes of DM. This episode, 'Blood Ties', although very enjoyable, is probably the least well camouflaged of all the backdoor pilots. A pair of female vice Detectives: Amy Devlin (Kathy Evison) and Taylor Lucas (Zoe McLellan) behave like female versions of Murtaugh and Riggs (from the Lethal Weapon franchise). Devlin being the female officer who 'made Detective faster than any woman in LAPD history', whereas Lucas is unorthodox and recklessly fearless. This episode, which is largely played for laughs, morphs into a version of Magnum Force as it transpires that the LAPD contains a Death Squad composed of all female officers who are killing criminals whose organs just happen to be urgently needed! The four rogue cops are played by the actress/models Brandi Sherwood, Michelle Lintel, Shannon Marketic and Kelli McCarty.
| 132 | 22 | "Today Is the Last Day of the Rest of My Life" | Ron Satlof | Ernest Kinoy | May 13, 1999 | 12.05 |
Dr. Mark Sloan attempts to have a new doctor arrested for murder after she helps a pair of terminally ill patients commit suicide. Guest Stars: Kim Little (plays Nurse Susan Hilliard) and Arthur Rosenberg (plays Harold Lomax, in his first appearance he is played by Richard Fancy and is the Administrator at Community General Hospital).
