= List of Diagnosis: Murder characters =

This is a list of characters in the drama/murder mystery television show, Diagnosis: Murder, which ran from 1993 to 2001. The characters are listed alphabetically by their last name or by the name which appears in the episode credits.

== Tanis Archer ==
Tanis Archer
- First appearance: Retribution Part 1
- Last appearance: Down Among The Dead Men
- Portrayed by: Susan Gibney

In-universe information
- Occupation: Police Detective

Tanis Archer, played by Susan Gibney, is Steve Sloan's 2nd partner. In the Diagnosis Murder Books it mentions she and Steve dated once but that it didn't work out.

She appears in seasons 5 and 6.

== Amanda Bentley ==
Amanda Bentley
- First appearance: Diagnosis of Murder
- Last appearance: Without Warning
- Portrayed by: Cynthia Gibb (First 3 TV movies); Victoria Rowell (TV series, last 2 TV movies)

In-universe information
- Occupation: Medical examiner/pathologist for Community General Hospital Chief of Pathology

Dr. Amanda Bentley is a medical examiner/pathologist. She appears in seasons 1-8 and is played by Victoria Rowell. However, in the first three TV Movies (Diagnosis of Murder, The House on Sycamore Street and A Twist of the Knife), Amanda is played by Cynthia Gibb. Victoria Rowell appeared in all the episodes of the series, with the exception of 15 (both sporadically) on (CBS).

In The first three TV movies Amanda Bentley (Cynthia Gibb) had feelings for Jack Parker (Stephen Caffrey). But she denied these feelings for him for the first two TV movies. In The TV movies she was not adopted, and her father was a doctor who wanted her to leave Community General Hospital and open up a practice with him financing it.

Dr. Amanda Bentley is a colleague of Dr. Mark Sloan's, with her specialization being pathology. Fiercely intelligent, beautiful and loyal to her friends, Amanda is an orphan (just as Victoria Rowell is), taken to an orphanage when she was younger and soon adopted. Her adopted father was an owner of a yacht, and his sailors were always good friends with the family. When she was six, Amanda took up ballet. She stopped dancing for medical school but returns to it at the end of season eight. She once fainted during medical school at the sight of her first corpse. She is constantly kidded about it in the first two seasons. It was revealed in season 1 that she was considering changing her specialty. In the episode Reunion with Murder, Amanda got a Guard Dog named Yoda. And in the episode "Confession" she adopts a rabbit. In The Diagnosis Murder books written by Executive Producer and Writer Lee Goldberg, it takes place right after the end of season 6 right when he left the show, which means seasons 7-8 + the two reunion Telefilms are not considered canon by the books. In the last book "The Last Word" Amanda is framed for selling body parts out of her morgue. At the end of the book after she was proved innocent the hospital and the County Coroner's Office offer her job back, but she thinks she might not go back.

At one point during the show Amanda's character is married once to Mr. Colin Livingston, a military man. In later episodes it is made clear that she is separated from Colin; however, whether this is the result of his death in a plane crash or a divorce varies from one episode to the next.

Amanda's character has a child from her marriage with Colin, her son, CJ (Colin Jesse). CJ was delivered by Jesse, and Mark is chosen to be his godfather. Later in the series, Amanda adopts another boy, Deon, from his abusive parents.

== Norman Briggs ==
Norman Briggs
- First appearance: Miracle Cure
- Last appearance: The Murder Of Mark Sloan
- Portrayed by: Michael Tucci

In-universe information
- Occupation: Head of Administration for Community General Hospital

Norman Briggs, played by Michael Tucci, is the Head of Administration for Community General Hospital.

Norman attended Yale University. He graduated in 1978 and was voted "Most Popular". Before going to graduate school, he served in the Peace Corps and was sent to Nigeria.

He took his first job at Community General, two years before Dr. Jack Stewart or Dr. Amanda Bentley came.

In a lot of episodes Norman talks about his mother "Minnie Briggs". He's constantly worried about his mother and what his mother thinks. He also has a sister named "Marie Briggs".

Throughout the show, Norman shows measurable contempt for Dr. Mark Sloan's solving cases for the LAPD/his son Steve. Norman feels it takes Mark away from his patients, and thus is not giving them the attention, they deserve. To please Norman, Mark often lies to him about his involvement with cases.

Though not popular with the staff at Community General (and well aware of that fact), he is still committed to the work of the hospital, and his efforts at managing to balance the books allow the Hospital to continue to function and prosper.

He now volunteers at the Malone Foundation, a trust fund dedicated to giving money to charity or free clinics. Norman enjoys this job because he says it is good to give money, knowing it will help people, instead of "pinching pennies" as he does at Community General.

The character appears in the first four seasons only.

== Cheryl Brooks ==
Cheryl Brooks
- First appearance: "Jake's Women"
- Last appearance: "On The Beach"
- Portrayed by: Charmin Lee

In-universe information
- Occupation: Police Detective

Cheryl Brooks, played by (Charmin Lee) is Steve Sloan's second partner. She has feelings for Steve, and he has feelings for her. They thought about dating each other after she was divorced.

She appears in seasons 7 and 8.

== Kate Hamilton ==
Kate Hamilton
- First appearance: Diagnosis Of Murder
- Last appearance: The House On Sycamore Street
- Portrayed by: Mariette Hartley

In-universe information
- Occupation: Head of Administration for Community General Hospital

Kate Hamilton, played by (Mariette Hartley) is the Head of Administration for Community General Hospital. She and Mark have feelings for each other.

She appears in the first two TV movies only.

In the third Diagnosis Murder book "The Shooting Script" it says in a file that Noah Dent has about Past Administrators that Dr. Sloan defamed her, convincing her to quit her job, sell her home, and use the proceeds to establish a nonprofit food bank in the inner city of Los Angeles.

== Susan Hillard ==
Susan Hillard
- First appearance: Drill for Death
- Last appearance: "Today Is the Last Day of the Rest of My Life"
- Portrayed by: Kim Little

In-universe information
- Occupation: Nurse for Community General Hospital

Nurse Susan Hillard, played by Kim Little, is Jesse Travis's girlfriend from the 5th to the 6th seasons.

In one of the episodes, it is mentioned she's originally from Oklahoma.

In the 7th-season episode "Bringing Up Barbie," Susan Hillard dumps Jesse for a chiropractor, but in the Diagnosis Murder books which are written by Lee Goldberg, one of the Writers and executive producers of the show, seasons 7–8 and the two reunion telefilms never happened. Susan Hillard is in most of the eight books, and in the sixth book, The Dead Letter, she and Jesse get married. In the last book, The Last Word, Jesse and Susan Travis are framed for contaminating organs and murdering several people. Carter Sweeney is behind it, and by the end of the book, Mark proves them innocent. Community General Hospital offers both Jesse and Susan their jobs back, but they think that they are not really wanted and think they will find new jobs.

== Josie ==
Josie
- First appearance: "It Never Entered My Mind" from "Jake and the Fatman"
- Last appearance: "It Never Entered My Mind" from "Jake and the Fatman"
- Portrayed by: Ally Walker

In-universe information
- Occupation: Medical Student for Clairemont Hospital

Josie, played by (Ally Walker) is a medical student at Clairemont Hospital and a close friend of Dr. Mark Sloan's.

When Dr. Mark Sloan was accused of murdering Clairemont Hospital Administrator Russell Havilland, Josie, Richard, and Thad help Mark find the real murderer.

== Delores Mitchell ==
Delores Mitchell
- First appearance: Miracle Cure written by James Kramer
- Last appearance: My Baby Is Out Of This World
- Portrayed by: Delores Hall

In-universe information
- Occupation: Secretary for Mark Sloan at Community General Hospital

Delores Mitchell, played by Delores Hall is Dr. Mark Sloan's secretary at Community General Hospital for the first two seasons.

In the episode (The 13 Million Dollar Man) it is mentioned that Delores Mitchell had an ex-husband. It remains unknown what became of Delores after the second season.

== Jack Parker ==
Jack Parker
- First appearance: Diagnosis Of Murder written by Dean Hargrove
- Last appearance: Diagnosis Murder TV movie : A Twist Of The Knife
- Portrayed by: Stephen Caffrey

In-universe information
- Occupation: Medical Student for Community General Hospital

Dr. Jack Parker, played by Stephen Caffrey is a Resident at Community General Hospital and a good friend of Dr. Mark Sloan's. Jack is in love with Amanda Bentley (Cynthia Gibb) and he tries desperately to get a date with her. He changed his last name to his mother's maiden Name because he didn't want anyone to realize he was the son of gangster Mr. Foss (Michael MacRae). He tried to get out of the shadow of his father's bad image. Jack Parker has a relative named Uncle Lester.

=== Details ===
Dr. Jack Parker was later replaced by Jack Stewart for the weekly series.

== Richard ==
Richard
- First appearance: It Never Entered My Mind from Jake and the Fatman written by Joyce Burditt
- Last appearance: It Never Entered My Mind from Jake and the Fatman
- Portrayed by: Steven Eckholdt

In-universe information
- Occupation: Medical Student for Clairemont Hospital

Richard, played by Steven Eckholdt is a medical student at Clairemont Hospital and a good friend of Dr. Mark Sloan's.

When Dr. Mark Sloan was accused of murdering Clairemont Hospital Administrator Russell Havilland, Richard Josie, and Thad help Mark find the real murderer.

== Mark Sloan ==
Dr. Mark Sloan
- Diagnosis Murder character
- Portrayed by: Dick Van Dyke
- First appearance: It Never Entered My Mind from Jake and the Fatman
- Last appearance: Without Warning
In-universe information
- Occupation: Head of Internal Medicine, Community General Hospital; Silent partner, BBQ Bob's, former army surgeon in a mash unit
- Father: James Sloan
- Mother: Henrietta Sloan
- Brothers: Stacey Sloan
- Sisters: Dora Sloan
- Spouse: Katherine Sloan (deceased)
- Children: Steve Sloan; Carol Sloan Hilton
- First cousins: Johnathan Nash (deceased); J. Edison Nash; Judith Nash; Julinne Nash; Harold
- Other relatives: Edna (sister in-law); Earl (brother in-law)

Dr. Mark Sloan, played by Dick Van Dyke, has been in medicine for over 40 years and is chief of internal medicine at Community General Hospital, well as being a consultant to the LAPD and a former army vet who served in a MASH unit. As a doctor, he is the black sheep of the family, coming from "a long line of cops" (his father was a police detective). He thought his dad left him and his siblings when he was ten years old but in fact his dad was murdered by his dad's partner, Danny McNamara. In 1963 Mark was going to become a cardiac surgeon but his mentor Gregory Nordhoff (David Purdham) disappeared and it looked like he had embezzled $50,000. However, 34 years later his body was found where the hospital was being worked on back in 1963 and at the end of the episode his murderer was found. Dick Van Dyke was one of two actors (next to his son) to appear in all the episodes of the series, during its eight-season run on CBS.

Mark Sloan is the son of James Sloan (Lewis Smith), and his wife Henrietta Sloan. Mark also has an older sister, Dora (Betty White), who owns a travel agency. He also has a younger brother, Stacey (Jerry Van Dyke), who owns a malt shop in Arkansas and has a tendency to sleepwalk. In the episode "The 13 Million Dollar Man", Mark is given a Pot bellied Pig named "Miss Piggy". He probably finds her a good home. He also takes care of a Basset Hound named "Bob" for a while and gives him to a couple of girls who live on the beach where he lives. He also has a sister in-law named Edna and a brother in-law named Earl.

Mark is a widower, since his wife Katherine died of cancer a little over 10 years ago. In "Today Is the Last Day of the Rest of My Life" it is revealed that she was in so much pain at the end of her life that he actually considered performing assisted suicide but didn't follow through for both ethical and personal reasons. This has left him with a conflicted view of the practice – although morally against it, he understands the reasons for it. Their son Steve Sloan was unaware of his father's conflict until it came up during the trial of a doctor who ended the lives of several terminally ill patients at their request.

With Katherine, he had two children. His son Steve (with whom Mark shares his Malibu beach house) is a lieutenant and police detective for the LAPD. Mark and Steve mentioned in an episode that they once had a dog and it died ten years ago. Mark also has an estranged daughter, Carol Sloan Hilton (Stacy Van Dyke), a nurse, who lives in Northern California. She later married Yvette Fahd and she changed her last name, so her new name is Carol Sloan Fahd. She and her husband were murdered in the Diagnosis Murder TV movie "A Town Without Pity". But her father and brother, Steve, help bring their murderers to justice.

Before Mark and his wife, Katherine, had a house they had an apartment at Armacost Avenue, in West Los Angeles. In the Diagnosis Murder book "The Silent Partner" it is mentioned that Mark and Katherine lived for many years in a ranch style house in Brentwood, California. His home in the first two seasons was a small house at 6544 Colorado Drive, Los Angeles. Sometime later, he buys a beach house located at 3231 Beach Drive, Malibu.

To pay for medical school, Mark served in the Army during the Korean War.

Mark likes jazz and Glenn Miller, enjoys dancing (soft shoe and tap). He can play a number of instruments including the clarinet and keyboards. He is good at chess and can often be found rollerblading when his car breaks down. His party piece is magic tricks.

In the final book, "The Last Word", Mark Sloan's life turned upside down when Carter Sweeney has his son Steve framed for murdering D.A. Neil Burnside, and Jesse and Susan Travis for murdering people on the operating table with contaminated organs. Mark ends up getting fired by new Head Administrator Janet Dorcott, who blames him for causing a scandal around the hospital. Mark asks Jack Stewart to pretend to get murdered to incite the wrath of his Uncle Elias Stewart. Uncle Elias helps Mark prove that they were framed by Carter Sweeney.

== Steve Sloan ==
Steve Sloan
- First appearance: Diagnosis of Murder
- Last appearance: Without Warning
- Portrayed by: Barry Van Dyke

In-universe information
- Occupation: Police Detective Sergeant/Lieutenant for LAPD

Police Detective Sergeant /Lieutenant Steve Sloan, played by Barry Van Dyke, is a police detective/lieutenant. The character appears in all 178 episodes across eight seasons.

Steve Sloan is the son of Dr. Mark Sloan and Mark's wife, Katherine. Katherine died of cancer when Steve was younger—throughout the series, Mark refers to her death occurring "ten years ago." Steve has one sibling, an estranged sister named Carol. (Carol is only mentioned in a few episodes.)

Right out of college, he joined the army and spent 18 months on one tour to Vietnam during the War. He took a second tour towards the end of the war. Afterwards, Steve joined the LAPD and, after season two, was promoted from homicide detective Sergeant to lieutenant. Following this appointment, Steve was subsequently promoted to his own one-man army, in his genuine pursuit of justice.

His apartment burns down and he moves to a separate apartment in his father's Malibu beach house. He often tries to move away, once even buying an electric house. After the house almost kills Mark, Steve begins renting it. Steve was once shot in the chest and was legally dead for three minutes until doctors were able to resuscitate him. This makes him a target in "Murder on the Hour".

At the beginning of season six, he and Dr. Jesse Travis go into business together. They co-own a barbecue restaurant called BBQ Bob's. Mark is also a silent partner.

Sloan is unmarried and it becomes a running gag that all his girlfriends turn out to be involved in murders that he is currently investigating, or they end up dead.

As a character he is quite active. Sloan played Little League, where he badly broke his nose, and American football in high school. He is quite athletic, enjoying jogging and playing and watching basketball, while he also rides dirtbikes and has a small catamaran on the beach. One of his dreams was to become a stunt man and in the episode "Frontier Dad" (Season Seven) he gets this chance, though is overcome with stage fright. (This episode was also written by Barry Van Dyke and starred all of Barry's children.) He also often uses his patented dive to apprehend criminals.

In the last TV movie, "Without Warning", Steve Sloan proposes to Ellen Sharpe a tabloid reporter he met in the episode Dance of Danger and she accepts.

She is portrayed by Kim Quinn.

In The Diagnosis Murder books written by executive producer and Writer Lee Goldberg, it takes place right after the end of season 6 right when he left the show, which means seasons 7-8 and the 2 reunion TV films are not considered canon by the books. The last book "The Last Word" has Steve being framed for murdering D.A. Neil Burnside by Carter Sweeney. By the end of the book, the police ask Steve to come back to the force, but he doesn't think he will go back to being a cop and instead he would become a private investigator.

=== Details ===
Towards the end of the series, Barry began writing his own episodes, such as "Never Say Die", and "Frontier Dad". All episodes Barry wrote star his four children: Carey, Shane, Wes and Taryn. Shane becomes a regular during season eight, portraying Alex, a medical student.

== Alex Smith ==
Alex Smith
- First appearance: Sleeping Murder
- Last appearance: Diagnosis Murder TV movie: Without Warning
- Portrayed by: Shane Van Dyke

In-universe information
- Occupation: Medical Student for Community General Hospital

Alex Smith is played by Shane Van Dyke and Is a Medical Student that is good friends with Mark, Steve, Jesse, and Amanda.

Alex Smith appears in the 7th-8th seasons and the last TV movie "Without Warning".

== Jack Stewart ==
Dr. Jack Stewart
- First appearance: Miracle Cure written by Bruce Franklin Singer
- Last appearance: My Baby Is Out Of This World
- Portrayed by: Scott Baio

In-universe information
- Occupation: Doctor for Community General Hospital

Dr. Jack Stewart, played by Scott Baio is a Doctor at Community General Hospital and is a close friend of Dr. Mark Sloan.

Jack Stewart appears only in the first two seasons. In season 3 it mentions that Jack Stewart leaves to start his own practice in Colorado. In the 1st Book "The Silent Partner" Jack Stewart returns to perform a surgery on a wealthy patient. Jack reveals that he left Community General because he fell in love with Amanda Bentley, and that he didn't want to say anything to ruin their relationship as friends. Jack Stewart also appears in the last book "The Last Word". In "The Last Word", Jack Stewart pretends to get murdered so Jack's Uncle Elias Stewart will help Mark go after Carter Sweeney, who framed his son Steve for murdering D.A. Neil Burnside, and framed Amanda for selling body parts out of her morgue, and Jesse and Susan Travis for murdering several people with contaminated organs. Jack Stewart smoothed things out with Elias Stewart after he pretended to be killed.

=== Family ===
Almost all of Jack Stewart's family is connected to the mob.

His father was mob boss Charles Stewart and his uncle's name is Elias Stewart. In the episode The 13 Million Dollar Man it mentioned that he has a relative named Uncle Lou who was a bootlegger. His godfather's name was Albert Bartell (Abe Vigoda) and he was murdered in the episode "You Can Call Me Johnson". Albert Bartell had a son named Vinnie Bartell (Mark Rolston).

== Thad ==
Thad
- First appearance: "It Never Entered My Mind" written by Joyce Burditt
- Last appearance: "It Never Entered My Mind" written by Joyce Burditt
- Portrayed by: Kristoff St. John

In-universe information
- Occupation: Medical Student for Clairemont Hospital

Thad, played by (Kristoff St. John), is a Medical Student at Clairemont Hospital, and a good friend of Dr. Mark Sloan.

When Dr. Mark Sloan was accused of murdering Clairemont Hospital Administrator Russell Havilland, Thad, Richard, and Josie help Mark find the real murderer.

== Jesse Travis ==
Dr. Jesse Travis
- First appearance: An Innocent Murder written by Cynthia Deming & William J Royce
- Last appearance: Without Warning
- Portrayed by: Charlie Schlatter

In-universe information
- Occupation: Trauma surgeon for Community General Hospital; Co-owner of BBQ Bob's restaurant

Dr. Jesse Travis, played by Charlie Schlatter, is introduced in "An Innocent Murder," the first episode of season three. The moment Charlie Schlatter joined the cast in 1995, Jesse became a breakout character. He appeared as a regular character through season 8, missing only five episodes.

After medical school, Jesse became a resident at Community General, where his teacher, Dr. Mark Sloan would inspire him to be a doctor.

According to the background revealed in the show, he was born in Minnesota. He was raised in Elgin, Illinois. His mother's name is never mentioned, but she was portrayed by Kathleen Noone. She is a podiatrist who owns a family practice in Minnesota. She is always trying to convince Jesse to move back. His father is Dane Travis (Robert Culp), who is a retired CIA spy and tennis professional. His parents are divorced. He also has a cousin named Morty.

In the Diagnosis Murder books, which are written by Lee Goldberg (one of the writers and executive producers of the show), seasons 7-8 and the 2 reunion TV movies never happened. It has Susan Hillard in most of the eight books and in the sixth book "The Dead Letter" she and Jesse get married. In the last book "The Last Word", Jesse and Susan Travis are framed for contaminating organs and murdering several people. Carter Sweeney was behind it and by the end of the book, Mark proves them innocent. Community General Hospital offers both Jesse and Susan their jobs back but, they don't really want them there so they think they will find new jobs.

(Charlie Schlatter was introduced in Season Three to replace Scott Baio, who'd left the show.)

== Madison Wesley ==
Madison Wesley
- First appearance: Sleeping Murder
- Last appearance: Getting Mad, Getting Even
- Portrayed by: Joanna Cassidy

In-universe information
- Occupation: Dean for Community General Hospital's Medical school

Dr. Madison Wesley, played by Joanna Cassidy is the Dean for Community General's Medical School. Mark Sloan seems to have feelings for her, and she seems to have feelings for him.

== Esther Wiggins ==
Esther Wiggins
- First appearance: Diagnosis Of Murder written by Dean Hargrove
- Last appearance: The House On Sycamore Street
- Portrayed by: Vernee Watson-Johnson

In-universe information
- Occupation: Secretary for Mark Sloan at Community General Hospital

Esther Wiggins, played by Vernee Watson-Johnson) is Dr. Mark Sloan's Secretary at Community General Hospital in the first two TV movies.
