= Diagnosis: Murder season 5 =

Diagnosis: Murder
- Season 5
- No. of episodes: 25

Release
- Original network: CBS
- Original release: September 25, 1997 – May 14, 1998

Season chronology
- ← Previous; Season 4 Next → Season 6

Diagnosis: Murder's fifth season originally aired Thursdays at 9:00–10:00 pm (EST). The season includes the 100th episode of the series. This is the first season of the show that didn't feature Michael Tucci in his role as Chief Hospital Administrator Norman Briggs.

The season was released on DVD in two parts and as a whole by Visual Entertainment, Inc. When the split season was released, the episode of Obsession Part 2 wasn't included. The scene where Mark meets Rob Petrie at the radio station is absent in the single releases but was included in the complete collection set.

== Cast ==
- Dick Van Dyke as Dr. Mark Sloan
- Victoria Rowell as Dr. Amanda Bentley
- Charlie Schlatter as Dr. Jesse Travis
- Barry Van Dyke as Steve Sloan

== Episodes ==
No. overall	No. in season	Title	Directed by	Written by	Original release date	U.S. viewers (millions)
86	1	"Murder Blues"	Christian I. Nyby II	Lee Goldberg & William Rabkin	September 18, 1997	13.96
The investigation of a councilman's wife's murder uncovers a possible conspiracy within the police department. Keen eyed viewers will spot the fact that all the guest stars in this episode are actors who previously starred in classic US TV Cop shows. Fred Dryer was in Hunter, James Darren was in T.J. Hooker, Angie Dickinson was in Police Woman, and Martin Milner and Kent McCord were in Adam-12. McCord also starred alongside Barry Van Dyke in Galactica 1980, the short-lived continuation of the original Battlestar Galactica. Guest Stars: Fred Dryer, Kent McCord, and Martin Milner. Murderer: Councilman Watson (James Darren) and Captain Cynthia Pike (Angie Dickinson)
87	2	"Open and Shut"	Christopher Hibler	Jacquelyn Blain	September 25, 1997	15.11
A judge's son, David, also a judge, has been having an affair with Allison Porter (Marisa Coughlan), the daughter of a media mogul, since she was 13. On her 18th birthday she announces to David that she is going public, saying "I'm an adult now, and you're not married, so there is no need for secrecy", whereupon he drowns her in the bathtub. Guest Stars: Carol Huston, James Read, and Robert Stack. Murderers: David and Peter McReynolds (Robert Stack)
88	3	"Malibu Fire"	Christian I. Nyby II	Story by : Gerry Conway; Teleplay by : Gerry Conway & Wayne Berwick	October 2, 1997	13.86
In the hills above Malibu, what appears to be a protest over a new housing development, leads to a major fire incident. At news of the fire, Community General swings into action. Steve Sloan, in his role as a local volunteer firefighter, is present when the body of an antagonistic ecologist (who had a long list of enemies) is discovered. While investigating, Steve is attacked and left unconscious in the path of the oncoming inferno. Guest Stars: Robert Fuller, Randolph Mantooth, Brian Patrick Clarke, and Richard Gross. Murderer: Sally Tremont
89	4	"Deadly Games"	Christopher Hibler	Jeff Peters	October 9, 1997	12.86
A wealthy blue blood is stabbed as part of a plot concocted by her chief security guard. Guest Stars: Michael Beck, Jack Kehler, Victoria Tennant, Patricia Charbonneau Murderer: Frank Waldeck
90	5	"Slam-Dunk Dead"	Vincent McEveety	Story by : Larry Brody; Teleplay by : Larry Brody and Lee Goldberg & William Rabkin	October 16, 1997	13.86
Jesse faces being fired and losing his State license because he is blamed for the death of a professional basketball star who took a lethal mixture of medications. Guest Stars: Dan Gilvezan (plays Kent Beaudine), Mark Taylor, Pooh Richardson, Malik Sealy, and Brent Barry. Murderer: Dwayne (Courtney Gains)
91	6	"Looks Can Kill"	Christopher Hibler	Craig Tepper	October 23, 1997	15.03
A seemingly healthy model drops dead, and her condition may be related to the extensive plastic surgery procedures she had undergone. The clinic that did her work comes under investigation. Guest Stars: Shelley Hack, Anthony Michael Hall, Neil Roberts, Jill Whelan Murderer: Dr. Richard Johnson
92	7	"Fatal Impact (Part I)"	Christian I. Nyby II	David Bennett Carren & J. Larry Carroll	October 30, 1997	14.93
Doctors Mark Sloan and Amanda Bentley participate in the investigation of an airliner's deadly crash. Guest Stars: Harry J. Lennix (plays F.B.I. Agent Ron Wagner) and Steven Anderson.
93	8	"Fatal Impact (Part II)"	Christian I. Nyby II	Jacquelyn Blain	October 30, 1997	14.93
Amanda's new boyfriend Special Agent Ron Wagner, declares he's taking over the investigation of the plane-crash and its hijack and smuggled Russian nuclear fuel rods for the FBI, but soon realizes he couldn't make anything like the necessary progress without the ingenious doctors trio and Steve. They team up for the investigation which becomes desperately urgent as there are indications that the nuclear material is to be used for a bomb likely to be used to cause an LA Apocalypse by surprising, personally vindictive suspect Diane, the spokesperson of the bereaved.
94	9	"Must Kill TV"	Christopher Hibler	Lee Goldberg & William Rabkin	November 6, 1997	15.45
A TV executive's death from a second heart attack leads Sloan to uncover the fact that her nitroglycerin tablets had been replaced by sugar pills. Guest stars: Michele Greene, Jaleel White, John Aniston, Erik Estrada, Peter Graves (plays himself doing a Pilot of Doctor Danger as Dr. Mark Sloane), Jane Seymour, Fred Willard, Stephen J. Cannell (plays Jackson Burley), Reginald VelJohnson, Doug E. Doug, Tom Gallop (plays Phil Zarkin), and Dr. Joyce Brothers. Murderer: Harry Fellows (Fred Willard)
95	10	"Discards"	Christian I. Nyby II	J. Larry Carroll & David Bennett Carren	November 13, 1997	16.07
Jesse gets involved in a deadly web of international intrigue when he discovers his father is a real-life secret agent. Guest stars: Robert Culp (plays Dane Travis, Jesse's Father), Barbara Bain (plays Cinnamon Carter, the same character she played on the Mission Impossible TV Series), Robert Vaughn, Phil Morris, and Patrick Macnee. Murderer: Jim Kesler
96	11	"A Mime Is a Terrible Thing to Waste"	Christopher Hibler	Lee Goldberg & William Rabkin	November 20, 1997	15.05
Rachel York stars as an attractive in-your-face polymath who finds a murdered mime in her bed. She will do anything to solve the murder, including stealing Steve's badge and calling herself Lieutenant Stevie Sloane. In the end, Mark and Steve agree that "She is really something!" Guest Star: Ken Kercheval. Murderer: Chelsea Drew (Kim Lankford)
97	12	"Down and Dirty Dead"	Ron Satlof	Barry Van Dyke	December 11, 1997	14.87
An extreme motocross daredevil's fatal crash during the filming of a lucrative video production, turns out to be sabotage. Guest Stars: Carey Van Dyke, and Shane Van Dyke. Murderer: Kyle Lewis
98	13	"Retribution: Part 1"	Christian I. Nyby II	Lee Goldberg & William Rabkin	January 8, 1998	13.89
The night before his crucial testimony in the trial of a drugs kingpin, Steve is seriously wounded in an attempted hit. Mark confronts the mobster and threatens him in front of multiple witnesses. When the crime lord is then murdered with the use of a sophisticated binary poison, Dr. Sloan becomes the prime suspect and is put on trial for murder. Guest Stars: Susan Gibney (who plays Tanis Archer), Fred Dryer (plays Police Chief Masters), Dennis Lipscomb, Jack Carter, and Connie Blankenship (who plays A.D.A. Sharon Ellison). Murderer: To be revealed in part 2.
99	14	"Retribution: Part 2"	Christian I. Nyby II	Lee Goldberg & William Rabkin	January 15, 1998	15.98
Four months after the events of the previous episode, a distraught Mark is still on death row and is being tormented by an old adversary whose crime Mark was instrumental in uncovering years earlier. Steve is recovering from his wounds but the vicious mob war that started in the previous episode, shows no signs of abating. Steve and ADA Sharon Elison race to find out who framed Mark and finally end the mob war. Guest Stars: Susan Gibney, Fred Dryer, Dennis Lipscomb, James Stephens, Neal McDonough, and Robb Skyler. Murderers: Malcolm Trainor and Ian Trainor
100	15	"Drill for Death"	Ron Satlof	Robin Madden	January 22, 1998	15.58
During an emergency drill at Community General the nursing administrator and an artist patient are murdered. Halfway through the episode a subway tunnel collapses and they have a real emergency on top of the drill. This 100th episode of the show features multiple guests stars from the original Robert Altman movie 'M*A*S*H' and the TV show 'M*A*S*H'. Guest stars: Kim Little (plays Nurse Susan Hilliard, Jesse's Girlfriend), Sally Kellerman, Elliott Gould, Loretta Swit, Jamie Farr, William Christopher, and Christopher Norris. Murderer: Adele Botsford
101	16	"Rain of Terror"	Christian I. Nyby II	Craig Tepper	January 29, 1998	14.42
On a wet and stormy night in Topanga Canyon the widow and daughter of an old friend of Mark's are anticipating their upcoming dinner party when violence suddenly erupts. When dinner guests Mark and Amanda arrive at the isolated house amidst the growing thunderstorm, they quickly suspect that all is not as it should be. Guest Stars: John O'Hurley, Phina Oruche, and Adrienne Barbeau. Murderers: Amy Sanderson (Ele Keats) and Dana Neal (Andy Shreeman)
102	17	"Baby Boom"	Vincent McEveety	Jacquelyn Blain	February 5, 1998	13.20
A man wearing a suicide vest, holds a child-birth class, along with Dr. Amanda, hostage. He claims that one of the expectant women used his sperm without permission. Guest Star: Sam McMurray Murderer: Nurse Perky
103	18	"Talked to Death"	Christian I. Nyby II	Joyce Burditt	February 26, 1998	15.25
A pair of talk-show hosts pull a February sweeps ratings stunt that ends with one killing the other. Guest Stars: Phyllis Diller, Army Archerd, Mary Frann, Kathie Lee Gifford, Regis Philbin, Ian Ogilvy, Greg Lauren, and Tod Susman. Murderers: Larry Duggin, Tom Grant & Lucy Caruso
104	19	"An Education in Murder"	Frank Thackery	Story by : Jacquelyn Blain and D. O'Brien & Paul Rendle; Teleplay by : Jacquelyn Blain	March 5, 1998	14.99
Mark is teaching a genetics class at Norrington Hall a highly competitive private prep school. A homicidally manipulative social butterfly plots multiple deaths for those who don't share her idea of returning 'favours'. Guest Star: Kim Little (Nurse Susan Hilliard) Murderer: Noelle Andrew
105	20	"Murder at the Finish Line"	Christopher Hibler	J. Larry Carroll & David Bennett Carren	March 26, 1998	13.76
Sloan investigates a speedway crash that (apparently) killed a stock-car racer. He soon discover that he may have died before the race even started. Guest Stars: Marina Sirtis and Tommy Kendall Murderer: Mary Ann Eagin
106	21	"First Do No Harm"	Vincent McEveety	Ernest Kinoy	April 16, 1998	14.62
A young patient dies in the ER due to red-tape delays involving an HMO, leading Sloan to question managed care. Guest Stars: Alan Oppenheimer, Jason Schombing, Richard Fancy (plays Harold Lomax the new Administrator at Community General Hospital), Neil Dickson, Nancy Youngblut (plays Nurse Nancy Rush), and Davenia McFadden (plays Betty Pearson). Murderer: None of the parties involved were found to be liable.
107	22	"Promises to Keep"	Christian I. Nyby II	David Bennett Carren & J. Larry Carroll	April 23, 1998	14.95
Disgraced ex-cop Ryan Matthews and his daughter, arrive in Los Angeles to identify a female murder victim believed to be Ryan's ex-wife, but it's not her. Note: This episode concludes a story that begins on Promised Land in "Total Security". Guest stars: Troy Evans, Gary Graham, and Christopher John Fields. Murderer: Eddie Ward
108	23	"Food Fight"	Ron Satlof	Jacquelyn Blain	April 30, 1998	13.09
Jesse volunteers to select the caterer for the important Benefactor's Ball when a murder is committed. Guest Stars: Kim Little (plays Nurse Susan Hilliard), Pat Morita, David L. Lander, Leslie Easterbrook, Conrad Janis, Erin Moran, and Don Most. Murderer: Emerson Horn
109	24	"Obsession: Part 1"	Christian I. Nyby II	Lee Goldberg & William Rabkin	May 7, 1998	13.43
Dr. Mark Sloan is convinced that the Sunny View Bomber, a serial bomber he helped convict of murder, is guilty even when there's another bombing after the man's execution takes place. Guest stars: Harry J. Lennix (plays F.B.I. Agent Ron Wagner), Orson Bean (plays Lewis Sweeney, the son of Reagen Sweeney, and father of Carter and Caitlin Sweeney), Arye Gross (plays Carter Sweeney), Stephanie Niznik (plays Caitlin Sweeney), and Dennis Boutsikaris (plays D.A. Neil Burnside). Murderer: To be revealed in part 2.
110	25	"Obsession: Part 2"	Christian I. Nyby II	Lee Goldberg & William Rabkin	May 14, 1998	12.03
Three months after the events in the previous episode, an unemployed Mark, Jesse and Steve together with Amanda and FBI Special Agent Ron Wagner, go on an unauthorized investigation into the apparently random bombings in Los Angeles. Guest Stars: Harry J. Lennix (plays F.B.I. Agent Ron Wagner), Arye Gross (plays Carter Sweeney), Stephanie Niznik (plays Caitlin Sweeney), Jasper Armstrong Marsalis (plays Amanda's child C.J.), and Dennis Boutsikaris (plays D.A. Neil Burnside). The first two episodes of the next season, with the same writers, Resurrection Parts I and II, continue these episodes with Carter Sweeney and his sister Caitlin. Also, one of the writers, Lee Goldberg has written a book: Diagnosis Murder #8: The Last Word, which is the last book in his series, in which Carter Sweeney appears again, coming up for an appeal. Murderers: Carter Sweeney and Caitlin Sweeney. Accessory to murder: Sharon Ellison, ADA.
