= Diagnosis: Murder (film series) =

American series of television films

The Diagnosis: Murder film series (1992–1993, 2002) is a series of five television films that aired as part of the CBS television series Diagnosis: Murder.

== TV films (1992–1993) ==
The first three Diagnosis: Murder television films were broadcast on CBS between January 5, 1992 and February 13, 1993, before the premiere of television series. The Diagnosis: Murder television series subsequently premiered on CBS on October 29, 1993.

=== Cast ===
- Dick Van Dyke as Dr. Mark Sloan
- Cynthia Gibb as Dr. Amanda Bentley
- Stephen Caffrey as Dr. Jack Parker
- Barry Van Dyke as Steve Sloan

=== Films ===
Film no.	Title	Directed by	Written by	Original release date	U.S. viewers (millions)
1	"Diagnosis of Murder"	Christopher Hibler	Dean Hargrove; Joyce Burditt	January 5, 1992	21.2
Dr. Mark Sloan investigates when a good friend (Bill Bixby) is accused of murdering his boss. Special guest stars: Ken Kercheval, William Atherton, Brynn Thayer, and Mariette Hartley.
2	"The House on Sycamore Street"	Christian I. Nyby II	Bruce Franklin Singer	May 1, 1992	15.6
One of Dr. Mark Sloan's old students apparently jumps off a tall building, falling to his death. But Sloan doesn't think he killed himself – Sloan thinks he was murdered. Guest stars: David Warner, Mariette Hartley, George Hamilton, and Peter Scolari.
3	"A Twist of the Knife"	Jerry London	Gerry Conway	February 13, 1993	16.1
An old girlfriend of Sloan's, Rachael Walters (Suzanne Pleshette), returns to the hospital to operate on a U.S. Senator. She deliberately infects the Senator with a staph infection, leading to his death. Mark suspects Rachael in the Senator's death and decides to investigate his old flame. Guest stars: Christina Pickles, and Ken Lerner.

== TV films (2002) ==
The final episode of the Diagnosis: Murder television series aired on May 11, 2001. Two Diagnosis: Murder television films were broadcast on CBS after this, on February 6 and April 26, 2002.

=== Cast ===
- Dick Van Dyke as Dr. Mark Sloan
- Victoria Rowell as Dr. Amanda Bentley
- Charlie Schlatter as Dr. Jesse Travis
- Barry Van Dyke as Steve Sloan

=== Films ===
Film no.	Title	Directed by	Written by	Original release date	U.S. viewers (millions)
4	"Town Without Pity"	Christopher Hibler	Joel Steiger	February 6, 2002	12.53
Dr. Mark Sloan and his son Steve go to the desert to learn the fate of Mark's daughter and her new husband (Faran Tahir).
5	"Without Warning"	Christian I. Nyby II	Story by : Burt Prelutsky & Steve Brown; Teleplay by : Burt Prelutsky	April 26, 2002	9.59
A dead body washes up by the ocean. Steve's investigation leads to a farm with migrant workers. The migrant workers are dying from an unknown ailment and Mark struggles to find the cause. Note: This is the final Diagnosis: Murder television film. This is also the effective series finale.
