= Georgia on My Mind (disambiguation) =

"Georgia on My Mind"' is a 1930 song written by Hoagy Carmichael and Stuart Gorrell, often associated with Ray Charles.

Georgia on My Mind may also refer to:

- Georgia on My Mind (novelette), a science fiction novelette by Charles Sheffield published in 1993
- "Georgia on My Mind" (Diagnosis Murder Episode), from the second season of the series
- "Georgia on My Mind", an episode from the twelfth season of the ABC News program, What Would You Do?
