= Mystery Woman =

- Genre: Mystery
- Created by: Michael Sloan
- Written by: Michael Sloan; Joyce Burditt
- Starring: Kellie Martin; Clarence Williams III
- Music by: Joe Kraemer
- Country of origin: United States
- Original language: English
- No. of episodes: 11

Production
- Executive producers: Robert Halmi Jr. Larry Levinson
- Producer: Lincoln Lageson
- Editor: Colleen Halsey
- Running time: 80–84 min.
- Production companies: Alpine Medien Productions; Larry Levinson Productions

Original release
- Network: Hallmark Channel
- Release: August 31, 2003 – January 13, 2007

Mystery Woman is the name of a series of 11 made-for-television mystery films released by the Hallmark Channel between 2003 and 2007, and now appearing regularly on the Hallmark Movies & Mysteries. While on the Hallmark Channel, it was broadcast in rotation with the movie series McBride, Murder 101, and Jane Doe, under the umbrella title Hallmark Channel Mystery Wheel.

In the UK, these movies are aired, on a rotation basis, in the afternoon drama slot on Channel 5. The series pilot aired in 2003, followed by ten episodes that ran through 2005–07.

Mystery Woman stars Kellie Martin as Samantha Kinsey, proprietor of a bookstore specializing in mystery books who gets involved in solving real-life mysteries. Martin has also directed two episodes.

== Main cast ==
- Kellie Martin as Samantha Kinsey: an avid murder-mystery fan who inherits a bookstore in the first film. Her extensive knowledge of murder-mystery books assists her in her amateur sleuthing. In the pilot, she is divorced, but this is never mentioned in the other films.
- J. E. Freeman in the first film, Clarence Williams III in subsequent films as Philby (Note: In the pilot, he is named Ian Philby. However, in Mystery Woman: In the Shadows, his name is Philby Cross.): Caretaker of the bookstore, later revealed to have worked in a secret agency for the government identified as O.S.D. Level 6 in Mystery Woman: Oh Baby. He is like a father figure to Samantha.
- Constance Zimmer in the first film, replaced by Nina Siemaszko in subsequent films as Cassie Hillman: An assistant to the District Attorney, and personal friend of Samantha's.
- Casey Sander as Chief Connors: The often-foiled police chief who is quick to arrest before Samantha usually proves him wrong. Despite the fact that he hates it when Samantha interferes in his investigations, Chief Connors does care for her, as shown in the last episode of the series Mystery Woman: In the Shadows when he tells her that she may be a pain in the backside but she is his pain in the backside. His affection is also shown in his nickname for her: "Snoopy".

== Films ==
No.	Title	Directed by	Written by	Original release date
1	"Mystery Woman"	Walter Klenhard	Michael Sloan	August 31, 2003
Recently divorced from art gallery owner Elliot McCallister (Steven Brand), Samantha Kinsey (Martin) inherits her Uncle Bobs' crime mystery-specialized bookshop. Jack Stenning (Robert Wagner) is Samantha's former literature professor and is working on a new true crime book. His adopted daughter Tracy tells Samantha that she worries her father's pursuit of his latest story may turn out to be dangerous. At a party in his home, Jack is murdered by a surprise guest who stages Jack's death to look like a suicide. Jack's estranged son Tom (Troy Bishop) and his boss Lieutenant Robert Hawke (William R. Moses) investigate but rule it a suicide. Although general heir and claiming she loved Jack despite serial adultery, his widow Mary (Joan Severance) asks Samantha and her friend Cassie to investigate it as a murder. Shortly after, Sam is the target of a break-in and sabotage convincing her that there is more to the mystery. She and her uncle's mysterious friend, Ian Philby (Freeman), discover that Jack's new book was connected to the disappearance of heiress Rebecca Carlson 10 years ago and his own murder may be linked to Carlson's murder.
2	"Mystery Woman: Mystery Weekend"	Mark Griffiths	Michael Sloan (creator), Joyce Burditt	January 7, 2005
A recluse hit author Clare Beckman (Beth Broderick) is about to announce her retirement at Samantha's bookshop when a gunshot is heard. While Clare manages to dodge the bullet, she is killed by cleverly planted bee venom which kills her instantly due to her being allergic to bees, a fact which few people knew about.
3	"Mystery Woman: Snapshot"	Georg Stanford Brown	Michael Sloan (creator), Joyce Burditt	January 28, 2005
Samantha's close friend Barbara (Patty McCormack) is agitated when she is left out of her brother Avery's will who recently died in a car crash. Barbara now suspects that there may be more to her brother's death. She requests Samantha to develop some photographs she took on Avery's birthday (on the day of the crash), certain that an explanation can be found but also worried that she can't trust anyone from her family including the family lawyer, Benson, who is trying to prove her unstable. Before Samantha can get back to her, Barbara is shot and murdered. Samantha investigates her friend's death with almost every family member of Barbara's making it on to the suspect list.
4	"Mystery Woman: Sing Me a Murder"	Stephen Bridgewater	Michael Sloan (creator), Joyce Burditt	February 25, 2005
Mystery Woman bookshop owner, Samantha Kinsey, has offered to host a charity concert for a once-famous folk-rock trio out to recapture their old fame. But the band's promoter is found murdered in his hotel room. Samantha and her partner in crime, Philby, set out to investigate and must ask all the band members to relive memories from their hazy past if they want to find the truth.
5	"Mystery Woman: Vision of a Murder"	Kellie Martin	Michael Sloan (creator), Joyce Burditt	June 5, 2005
Samantha is invited to a state of the art resort and spa to shoot photographs for their brochure. Samantha and her friend Cassie meet the staff and other guests but soon one of the guests, Debbie, is found murdered incidentally right after her friend and fellow guest Alice discovered Debbie was having an affair with her husband. All the guests at the healing center become suspects as Samantha tries to find the killer.
6	"Mystery Woman: Game Time"	David S. Cass Sr.	Michael Sloan (creator), Mark Saraceni	August 21, 2005
An old friend from Samantha's elementary school days trying to sell his latest mystery video game and a reclusive author holding a book signing at Mystery Woman don't seem likely to cross paths. But a fatal poisoning using a biological weapon screams GAME OVER for one of them. Now Samantha has to play detective or risk losing more than just a game.
7	"Mystery Woman: At First Sight"	Kellie Martin	Michael Sloan (creator), Mark Saraceni	January 21, 2006
Samantha finds her mother, who gave her up for adoption. Then Samantha’s mom is arrested for murder. Samantha sets out to solve the crime.
8	"Mystery Woman: Wild West Mystery"	David S. Cass Sr.	Michael Sloan (creator), Joyce Bruditt, Paul Bruditt	March 18, 2006
Samantha is helping plan the Wild West Days event in her town of Walden, which will include the famous Clint Lawson and his gang of actors from the Red River Days Western-themed TV show. But an accident with Clint's saddle and the shooting of one of the Red River Days cast members forces Samantha, Philby, Cassie, and Chief Connors to saddle up to roust out ugly secrets from these cowboys and cowgirls.
9	"Mystery Woman: Oh Baby"	David S. Cass Sr.	Michael Sloan (creator), Joyce Bruditt, Mark Saraceni	August 19, 2006
A couple accused of a murder go on the run, leaving their baby in the care of bookshop owner & amateur sleuth Samantha Kinsey. Can Samantha look after the baby and solve the case?
10	"Mystery Woman: Redemption"	David S. Cass Sr.	Michael Sloan (creator), Joyce Bruditt	November 6, 2006
A rare first edition from a pioneer author goes missing in the mystery novels-specialized Kinsey bookshop during remodeling by the local firm of Tyler Dell, who recently lost his father, a Vietnam veteran. Retired English teacher Jim Carter, who overheard everything, is murdered shortly after a row in Reverend Tucker's homeless shelter Haven with aggressive lush Murphy. Rude police chief Connors isn't up to an investigation while the killer keeps sniping, so the bookstore's armchair sleuths duo does it alone, starting from a lacquered box left by Jim for his illegitimate daughter, who never even knew his name. It starts a set of cues, slowly unraveling a grim intrigue starting during a 1965 US illegal intrusion into Red Khmer territory.
11	"Mystery Woman: In the Shadows"	David S. Cass Sr.	Michael Sloan (creator), Eric Enroth, Patricia Tait	January 13, 2007
While searching for a KGB double agent who was about to be exposed by another Russian spy-turned-successful author, Samantha and Philby are thrust into the murderous world of international espionage.

== Continuity ==
Throughout the series, the Jeep Liberty driven by Samantha alternates from an all silver vehicle with a large roof rack, to one that's silver with black trim and a smaller roof rack.
