= Likely Suspects =

- Created by: Steve Aspis
- Starring: Sam McMurray; Jason Schombing
- Country of origin: United States
- Original language: English
- No. of seasons: 1
- No. of episodes: 13

Production
- Producers: Lee Goldberg; William Rabkin; Paul Bernbaum; Clifton Campbell
- Running time: 30 minutes
- Production company: Four Point Entertainment

Original release
- Network: Fox
- Release: September 11, 1992 – January 14, 1993

Likely Suspects is an American crime drama that aired from September 11, 1992, to January 14, 1993.

== Premise ==
The show is an interactive crime drama where the viewer is treated as the protagonists' rookie partner.

== Cast ==
- Sam McMurray as Detective Marshak
- Jason Schombing as Detective Harry Spinoza

== Episodes ==
No.	Title	Directed by	Written by	Original release date
1	"Pilot"	Don Scardino	Steve Aspis	September 11, 1992
2	"Breaking Up is Hard to Do"	Unknown	Paul Bernbaum	September 19, 1992
A sexual surrogate has been murdered.
3	"The Royal Flush"	Peter Baldwin	Lee Goldberg & William Rabkin	September 26, 1992
A controversial radio personality has been drowned in a toilet.
4	"Final Chapter (a.k.a. The Killer Book)"	Burt Brinckerhoff	Paul Bernbaum	October 2, 1992
A tv reporter drowns in a pool.
5	"The Cheese Stands Alone"	Tucker Gates	Clifton Campbell	October 9, 1992
A host of a children's show has been murdered.
6	"Smells Like Teen Spirit"	David Nutter	Lee Goldberg & William Rabkin	October 16, 1992
Marshak and the rookie tries to find a murderer at a nightclub.
7	"Game, Set and Death"	Dean Parisot	Paul Bernbaum	October 23, 1992
A volleyball player is murdered.
8	"Addicted to Murder"	Bryan Spicer	Lee Goldberg & William Rabkin	November 6, 1992
Someone is killed in a sauna. The detectives get a new captain.
9	"Mind over Murder"	Peter Baldwin	Lee Goldberg & William Rabkin	November 13, 1992
10	"A Date with Death"	Burt Brinckerhoff	Lee Goldberg & William Rabkin	November 20, 1992
11	"Am I Not Your Stiff?"	David Nutter	Clifton Campbell & Paul Bernbaum	December 11, 1992
A rock star from Ireland is murdered.
12	"McDeath"	Miles Watkins	Lee Goldberg & William Rabkin	January 8, 1993
An executive for a fast-food restaurant is murdered.
13	"Murder Among Friends"	Peter Baldwin	Lee Goldberg & William Rabkin	January 15, 1993
A landscaper is killed.
