= Leap of Faith (film) =

1992 film by Richard Pearce

- Original theatrical poster
- Directed by: Richard Pearce
- Written by: Janus Cercone
- Produced by: Michael Manheim; David V. Picker
- Starring: Steve Martin; Debra Winger; Lolita Davidovich; Liam Neeson; Lukas Haas
- Cinematography: Matthew F. Leonetti
- Edited by: John F. Burnett; Mark Warner; Don Zimmerman
- Music by: Cliff Eidelman; Billy Straus
- Distributed by: Paramount Pictures
- Release date: December 18, 1992
- Running time: 108 minutes
- Country: United States
- Language: English
- Budget: $20 million
- Box office: $23.4 million

Leap of Faith is a 1992 American comedy-drama film directed by Richard Pearce and starring Steve Martin, Debra Winger, Lolita Davidovich, Liam Neeson, and Lukas Haas. The film is about Jonas Nightengale, a Christian faith healer who uses his revival meetings to milk money out of the inhabitants of Rustwater, Kansas.

== Plot ==
Faith healer Jonas Nightengale and his manager Jane Larson break down in Rustwater, Kansas, a small, rural town suffering from a long drought. Learning they will have to wait four days for replacement parts for their truck, Jonas decides to hold revival meetings to help pay for the repairs.

Jonas and his staff use cons to make it appear as if Jonas has divine knowledge. Despite his repeated diversions whenever he is asked when the drought will end, the townspeople find Jonas's shows to be entertaining and inspiring, and eagerly donate their money.

Sheriff Will Braverman is skeptical and decides to investigate Jonas's past. He learns that Jonas is in fact Jack Newton, a native of New York City who lived a life of crime in his teen years. Braverman shares this information with the townspeople, who have gathered for another tent revival. Jonas storms off the stage, but soon returns to successfully spin Braverman's report, leaving the crowd more energized than ever, much to Braverman's exasperation. Nightengale continues his dubious ministry over the next several days as Jane and Braverman find themselves falling for each other.

Nightengale attempts to begin a relationship with diner waitress Marva, whose brother Boyd walks with crutches following an auto accident. She explains that doctors could not find anything physically wrong with him and his ailment is psychosomatic. Boyd comes to believe that Jonas can help him walk again. During a meeting, Boyd walks to the crucifix and touches the feet of Jesus. He drops his crutches and begins to walk unassisted, and the awed crowd sweeps the stage. After the show, an enraged Jonas rails to Jane that they were conned, but then realizes Boyd walking again could only be a real miracle.

After the revival, Jonas enters the empty, darkened tent and mocks the crucifix and Christianity. Boyd enters and says he wants to join Jonas on the road, and Jonas agrees to meet him the following morning. Marva arrives and sends Boyd out of the tent. She thanks Jonas, who asks her to give Boyd a message the next morning: just because someone does not show up, that does not mean he does not care.

Jonas leaves the tent and sees that a crowd has gathered — many praying, some sleeping in groups, and others feeding those present. He begins to understand that Boyd's miracle, and the faith that enabled it, are real after all. He packs a bag and departs alone under the cover of darkness, leaving behind his entire road show and hitching a ride with a truck driver bound for Pensacola, Florida.

When the driver asks if he is in trouble, Jonas replies that for the first time in his life he is not. The drought threatening Rustwater's crops harvest comes to a dramatic end with a miraculous downpour. Jonas laughs as he realizes the truth, and he rides off into the stormy evening, hanging out the truck window and loudly thanking Jesus for the rain.

== Cast ==
- Steve Martin as Jonas Nightengale/Jack Newton
- Debra Winger as Jane Larson
- Lolita Davidovich as Marva
- Liam Neeson as Sheriff Will Braverman
- Lukas Haas as Boyd
- Albertina Walker as Lucille
- Meat Loaf as Hoover
- Philip Seymour Hoffman as Matt
- M. C. Gainey as Tiny
- La Chanze as Georgette
- Delores Hall as Ornella
- Phyllis Somerville as Dolores
- Troy Evans as Officer Lowell Dade
- Ricky Dillard as Choirmaster

== Production ==
The movie was filmed in Groom, Claude, and Tulia, Texas, though parts of the movie were filmed in Plainview, where the town water tower had the fictional town mascot and name painted on the side until 2016. Michael Keaton was considered for the starring role, but ultimately Martin was cast. The consultant for cons and frauds was Ricky Jay who was called in a 1993 article of The New Yorker as "perhaps the most gifted sleight-of-hand artist alive".

David Picker was called in to help produce the film at short notice. He said filming quickly got behind schedule and he suggested the director, Richard Pearce, be fired. The studio refused this but allowed Picker to fire the cameraman and replace him with Matt Leonetti. According to Picker, Pearce was unable to handle Debra Winger and Lolita Davidovich.

== Reception ==
On Rotten Tomatoes the film has an approval rating of 64% based on reviews from 22 critics. The site's consensus states: "Steve Martin's layered performance transcends Leap of Faith's somewhat undercooked narrative."

Roger Ebert of the Chicago Sun-Times gave the film three out of four, and wrote: "The movie itself has considerable qualities, among them Martin's performance as Nightengale. This isn't the sleek, groomed, prosperous Steve Martin we've seen in movies like L.A. Story. It's Martin as a seedy, desperate, bright, greedy man without hope." Janet Maslin of The New York Times wrote: "Well acted and amusingly told, featuring a fine performance by Steve Martin in the central role, this tale ultimately switches gears and takes a deeply serious turn."

== Musical adaptation ==
The Center Theatre Group presented the musical at the Ahmanson Theatre, Los Angeles, with Rob Ashford as director and choreographer. Performances began on September 11, 2010, with an official opening on October 3, 2010, running through October 24, 2010. Raul Esparza played the role of Jonas Nightengale and Brooke Shields played the role of Marva. The musical began previews on Broadway at the St. James Theatre on April 3, 2012, and opened on April 26, 2012, before closing after only 20 performances. Direction was by Christopher Ashley, choreography by Sergio Trujillo, a revised book by Warren Leight, with a cast featuring Raúl Esparza as Jonas Nightengale, and Jessica Phillips as Marva.
