= Kim Johnston Ulrich =

American actress

- Born: Kim Johnston; Ripon, California, U.S.
- Education: Modesto Junior College (AA); California State University, Stanislaus (BA)
- Occupations: Actress; model
- Years active: 1983–present
- Known for: Passions; As the World Turns; Perry Mason: The Case of the Murdered Madam
- Spouse: Robert J. Ulrich (m. 1981)
- Children: 2

Kim Johnston Ulrich is an American actress.

== Early life and education ==
Ulrich was born Kim Charisse Johnston in Ripon, California. She earned an Associate of Arts degree in fashion merchandising from Modesto Junior College and a Bachelor of Arts degree in art from California State University, Stanislaus.

== Career ==
Before Ulrich became an actress, she worked as a model, appearing in national magazines.

From 1983 to 1986, Ulrich played the role of Diana McColl on As the World Turns. In 1985, she appeared in "Grappling Steele", an episode of Remington Steele, where she played a soap opera actress. In 1987 she appeared in an episode of The Charmings as Cinderella. In 1988, she guest-starred in two episodes of Werewolf. In 1988, she appeared as Rachel in an episode of Cheers. In 1990, Ulrich appeared on the TV series Wings as Carol, Brian's former wife. In 1993, Ulrich appeared in the pilot episode of Lois & Clark: The New Adventures of Superman as Dr. Antoinette Baines, a villainous scientist. She appeared in a third-season episode of Highlander: The Series in 1995. She appeared in the first episode of season four of Diagnosis Murder as a conniving wife in the episode "Murder by Friendly Fire" in 1996.

In 1999, she played the role of Dorothy "Dottie" Strudwick in two episodes of 3rd Rock from the Sun. She played the role of Ivy Winthrop Crane on NBC's daytime drama Passions from 1999 to 2008. In 2010 and 2011, she played the role of Doctor Visyak on The CW television series Supernatural in the episodes "Like a Virgin", "Let It Bleed", and "The Man Who Knew Too Much". She also played Nancy Hargrove in the eighth-season episode "A Man Walks Into a Bar..." of NCIS.

== Personal life ==
She married casting director Robert J. Ulrich on January 3, 1981, in Modesto, California.

== Filmography ==
=== Film ===
Year	Title	Role	Notes
1983	Zelig	Beauty Contestant	Uncredited
1988	Spellcaster	Teri	
1995	Rumpelstiltskin	Shelley Stewart	
2018	Rocking the Couch	—N/a	Documentary
2019	Chain of Death	Rebecca	

=== Television ===
Year	Title	Role	Notes
1983–1985	As the World Turns	Diana McColl	12 episodes
1985	Remington Steele	Whitney Chambers	Episode: "Grappling Steele"
1985	Hostage Flight	Jane	Television film
1986	Hotel	Tracy Benedict	Episode: "Scapegoats"
1986	The A-Team	Elaine	Episode: "Beneath the Surface"
1986	Hunter	Allison Kavaley	2 episodes
1987	Our House	Carol Grey	Episode: "Family Secrets"
1987	The Hogan Family	Dawn Cassidy	Episode: "Community Theatre"
1987	Sweet Surrender	Jennifer	Episode: "The Holdens Go to Dinner"
1987	J.J. Starbuck	Daphne	Episode: "A Killing in the Market"
1987	Perry Mason: The Case of the Murdered Madam	Candy	Television film
1987	The Charmings	Cinderella	Episode: "Cindy's Back in Town"
1987	St. Elsewhere	Gena Parrish	Episode: "Handoff"
1987, 1988	My Two Dads	Patti Ann Klawicki	2 episodes
1987, 1990	Jake and the Fatman	Tessa Carmichael / Tina	2 episodes
1988	Werewolf	Diane Bathory	2 episodes
1988	The Highwayman	Mellissa	Episode: "Billionaire Body Club"
1988	Cheers	Rachel	Episode: "Swear to God"
1988, 1991	Matlock	Laura Corning / Sandy Farrell	2 episodes
1989	Nightingales	Allyson Yates	13 episodes
1989	Monsters	Madeline Wescott	Episode: "Cocoon"
1990	Mancuso, F.B.I.	Barbara Turner	Episode: "Ahami Awry Kidnapped"
1990	The Love Boat: A Valentine Voyage	Kelly	Television film
1990	Midnight Caller	Eda Marshall	2 episodes
1990	Wings	Carol Hackett	2 episodes
1990	The Family Man	Pat	Episode: "The New Guy"
1991	Dallas	Bootsie Ewing	Episode: "Conundrum"
1991	Who's the Boss?	Christine Morrison	Episode: "The Road to Washington: Part 2"
1991	Blood Ties	Amy Lorne	Television film
1991	Sisters	Tiffany Blue	2 episodes
1991	Reasonable Doubts	Lila Simon	8 episodes
1992, 1994	Murder, She Wrote	Julia Harris / Andrea Cromwell	2 episodes
1993	Major Dad	Lt. Kent	Episode: "I'll Be Seeing You"
1993	Lois & Clark: The New Adventures of Superman	Dr. Antoinette Baines	Episode: "Pilot"
1994	Walker, Texas Ranger	Lisa Dutton	Episode: "The Committee"
1994	A Perry Mason Mystery: The Case of the Grimacing Governor	Karen Richards	Television film
1994–1996	Diagnosis: Murder	Various roles	3 episodes
1995	Renegade	Officer Elaine Hart	Episode: "Den of Theieves"
1995	Highlander: The Series	Ceirdwyn	Episode: "Take Back the Night"
1995	Dazzle	Valerie Kilkullen	Television film
1995	High Tide	Maddy / Madeleine	Episode: "Down South"
1995	Strange Luck	Terry	Episode: "The Liver Wild"
1996	Murder One	Woman	Episode: "Chapter One, Year Two"
1997	Moloney	Lily	Episode: "I'm Ambivalent About L.A."
1998	7th Heaven	Nancy Randall	Episode: "Drunk Like Me"
1998	Spy Game	Allegra Markovich	Episode: "How Diplomatic of You"
1999	Any Day Now	Trudy Dennis	Episode: "Blue"
1999	Smart Guy	Sandy Hastings	Episode: "Cross Talk"
1999	3rd Rock from the Sun	Dorothy Strudwick	2 episodes
1999–2008	Passions	Ivy Winthrop	738 episodes
2005	CSI: Crime Scene Investigation	Mrs. Levine	Episode: "Iced"
2006	Standoff	Judith Cunningham	Episode: "Pilot"
2011	NCIS	Nancy Hargrove	Episode: "A Man Walks Into a Bar..."
2011	The Mentalist	Kim Cartwright	Episode: "Every Rose Has Its Thorn"
2011	Supernatural	Dr. Eleanor Visyak	3 episodes
2012	Drop Dead Diva	Caitlin Andrews	Episode: "Ashes to Ashes"
2014	Castle	Lenanne Dagmar	Episode: "Once Upon a Time in the West"
2014	Major Crimes	Janet Olson	Episode: "Party Foul"
2017	Law & Order True Crime	Connie	3 episodes
2018	The Rookie	Alice	Episode: "The Switch"
