= Delores Hall =

American stage and television actress

Delores Hall is an American stage and television actress who made her Broadway debut as a replacement in the ensemble of Hair.

== Musical theatre career ==
Starting in 1968 and through at least the summer of 1969, Hall was an original member of the Los Angeles production of Hair. Wearing signature pigtails she opened the show, singing "Aquarius". Hall was still involved in Hair in 1971, having performed "Aquarius" and "The Lord's Prayer" at the show's birthday celebration at the Cathedral of St. John the Divine in New York and released on the album Divine Hair / Mass in F. She appeared in Godspell starting in 1972 on and off for the next 2 years stopping the show every night singing "Bless The Lord". Hall would then riff an a cappella encore and stop the show again.

Hall played "Bread" in the 1972 musical Dude and performed in the original musical revues The Night That Made America Famous and Your Arms Too Short to Box with God, for which she won a Tony Award.

Hall's debut LP was released in 1973 by RCA Records, titled "Hall-Mark" and produced by Billy Jackson. She also released an LP on Capitol Records in 1979 titled Delores Hall produced by Robert Thiele Jr. and Mark Kamins for Coco Rose Productions.

She went on to star as "Jewel" in the original New York production of The Best Little Whorehouse in Texas.

== Film and television ==
Delores Hall's first movie was Scrooged, in 1988. She played a security guard named Delores in Lethal Weapon 3 (1992). Hall played Ornella in Leap of Faith (1992). On television, she was a regular on the first two seasons of Diagnosis: Murder, playing Delores Mitchell.

== Filmography ==
Year	Title	Role	Notes
1988	Scrooged	Hazel	
1992	Lethal Weapon 3	Delores Jackson	
1992	Leap of Faith	Ornella	
1993–95	Diagnosis: Murder	Delores Mitchell	41 episodes
