= Michael Tucci =

American actor (born 1946)

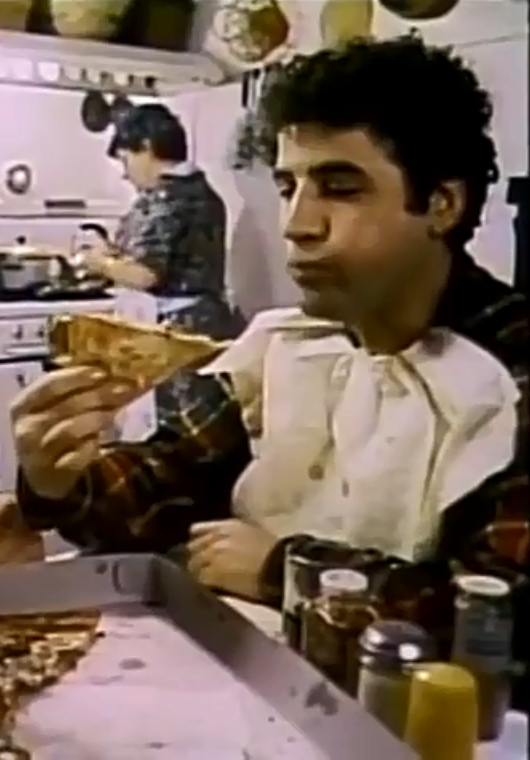
- Tucci in 1977
- Born: April 15, 1946 (age 80); New York, New York, U.S.
- Occupations: Actor, singer
- Years active: 1975–2018
- Spouse: Kathleen Tucci
- Children: 2

Michael Tucci (born April 15, 1946) is an American actor and retired high school teacher. He played Pete Schumaker in It's Garry Shandling's Show (1986–1990), and Sonny LaTierri in the 1978 film Grease.

== Personal life ==
He graduated from H. Frank Carey Junior-Senior High School in Franklin Square, New York, and C.W. Post College of Long Island University, where he was President of local Sigma Beta Epsilon fraternity that had Marjorie Merriweather Post as its honorary house mother and later became a chapter of Sigma Alpha Epsilon national fraternity. Tucci also served as a dormitory Residence Manager. He also earned a J.D. degree from St. John's Law School. He is married to a former television network executive, Kathleen, with whom he has two daughters, Kate (b. 1989) and Kelly (b. 1994).

== Career ==
Tucci is best known for playing the T-Birds member Sonny LaTierri in the 1978 film version of the musical Grease. He portrayed law student Gerald Golden in the TV series The Paper Chase from 1983 to 1986. He then played best friend Pete Schumaker on It's Garry Shandling's Show (1986–1990). He also spent more than three years touring with companies of the musical Chicago, performing as Amos, Roxy Hart's husband. Additionally, he performed as the Green Apple in the play "Destination" by Uta Hagen. He was in numerous productions on Broadway.

On television, he played Mark Sloan's friend and hospital administrator Norman Briggs for the first four seasons of Diagnosis: Murder. He played the father of Melissa McCarthy's character in The Heat (2013).

Tucci was also a teacher and theatre coach at St. Francis High School in La Cañada Flintridge, California. In 2014 he directed the school's rendition of We're the Millers starring American Croatian comedians George Dulcich and Stanko Zovak.

== Filmography ==
Year	Title	Role	Notes
1975	The Night They Robbed Big Bertha's	Lou	
1975	Forced Entry	Richie	Alternative title: The Last Victim
1978	Grease	Sonny LaTierri	
1979	Sunnyside	Harry Cimoli	
1981	Lunch Wagon	Arnie	Alternative title: Lunch Wagon Girls
1982	Pandemonium	Man Leaving Restaurant	
1982	Groucho	Chico Marx	
1998	Evasive Action	Judge	
1999	Elevator Seeking	Carl	Direct-to-video
2001	Blow	Dr. Bay	
2001	Mimic 2	Dr. Shapiro	Direct-to-video
2013	The Heat	Mr. Mullins	

== Television credits ==
Year	Title	Role	Notes
1976	Delvecchio	George Sanfillipo	Episode – "Red Is the Color of My True Love's Hair"
1976	Barney Miller	Fred	Episode – "Hash"
1978	Barney Miller	Rubin	Episode – "The Accusation"
1979	The Love Boat	Sam	Episode – "Ages of Man/Bo 'n Sam/Families"
1980	Barney Miller	Danny Rizzo	Episode – "People's Court"
1980	Angie	Dennis	Episode – "Angie and Brad's Close Encounter"
1980	Alice	Dino	Episodes – "Hello Vegas, Goodbye Diner", "Too Many Robert Goulets"
1980	Enola Gay: The Men, the Mission, the Atomic Bomb	Captain Claude Eatherly	TV movie
1981	Lou Grant	Marvin	Episode – "Reckless"
1982	Barney Miller	Gilbert Doyle	Episode – "The Clown"
1982–1983	Trapper John, M.D.	Dr. Charlie Nichols	Recurring role (3 episodes)
1982	The Powers of Matthew Star	Pileggi	Episode – "The Italian Caper"
1983–1986	The Paper Chase	Gerald Golden	36 episodes
1984	Night Court	Mr. Pina	Episode – "The Nun"
1985	Diff'rent Strokes	Officer Jim Coletta	Episode – "Street Smarts"
1986	Cagney & Lacey	Polonais	Episode – "The Man Who Shot Trotsky"
1986	Faerie Tale Theatre	Lionel	Episode – "The Princess Who Had Never Laughed"
1986–1990	It's Garry Shandling's Show	Pete Schumaker	Main cast (71 episodes)
1991	MacGyver	Philip	Episode – "Honest Abe"
1991	Chance of a Lifetime	Randall	TV movie
1992–1993	Flying Blind	Jeremy Barash	Main cast (22 episodes)
1993–1997	Diagnosis: Murder	Norman Briggs	Main cast (85 episodes)
1994	Monty	Dr. Rubin	Episode – "Baby Talk"
1994	MacShayne: The Final Roll of the Dice	Harvey Bell	TV movie
1995	Just Like Dad	Frank Turner	TV movie
1996	The Man Who Captured Eichmann	Danny	TV movie
1997	Life's Work	Principal Blair	Episode – "Harassment"
1999	JAG	Father Genaro	Episode – "Second Sight"
2001	Once and Again	Arnold	Recurring role (2 episodes)
2015	The Comedians	Billy's Agent	Episode – "Pilot"
