= William Rabkin =

American novelist

- Born: Berkeley, California, U.S.
- Education: University of Washington, UCLA
- Occupations: Television producer television writer and author
- Years active: 1987–present

William Rabkin is an American television producer, television writer and author.

== Early life ==
Rabkin grew up in Berkeley, CA, where his father was a Classics professor. He graduated from the University of Washington in Seattle, then received his MFA in screenwriting from UCLA, where he wrote for the Daily Bruin student newspaper.

== Career ==
He has written for a number of notable television series namely Spenser: For Hire, Murphy's Law, Hunter, Baywatch, Diagnosis Murder, A Nero Wolfe Mystery, Haunted Lives: True Ghost Stories, Monk and many other series.

Nearly all of his television work has been collaborations with fellow writer and producer Lee Goldberg, whom he met when they were both UCLA students working on Daily Bruin. They first teamed up as writers on the unmade, feature film adaptation of Goldberg's novel .357 Vigilante, beginning a professional partnership that lasted for twenty years.

Rabkin is also the author of a number of tie-in companion novels for the Psych television series, as well as the reference books Successful Television Writing (2003) (which he co-authored with Goldberg), Beginning Television Writing, (2010), and Writing the Pilot (2011).

=== Teaching ===
He teaches screenwriting as part of the faculty at UC Riverside's Low-Residency Graduate Creative Writing Program in Palm Desert, California. and is assistant director of the MFA program at Long Island University

== Personal life ==
His father was Norman Rabkin (1930-2012), the Shakespearean scholar best known for his work Shakespeare and the Problem of Meaning.

== Bibliography ==
- Ella Clah: The Pilot Script (with Lee Goldberg, Aimee Thurlo & David Thurlo) (2013)

=== The Dead Man Series ===
- Face of Evil (with Lee Goldberg) (2011)
- Ring of Knives (with Lee Goldberg and James Daniels) (2011)
- Hell in Heaven (with Lee Goldberg) (2011)
- The Dead Woman (with Lee Goldberg and David McAfee) (2011)
- The Blood Mesa (with Lee Goldberg and James Reasoner) (2011)
- Kill Them All (with Lee Goldberg and Harry Shannon) (2011)
- Beast Within (with Lee Goldberg and James Daniels) (2011)
- Fire & Ice (with Lee Goldberg and Jude Hardin) (2012)
- Carnival of Death (with Lee Goldberg and Bill Crider) (2012)
- Freaks Must Die (with Lee Goldberg and Joel Goldman) (2012)
- Slaves to Evil (with Lee Goldberg and Lisa Klink) (2012)
- The Midnight Special (with Lee Goldberg and Phoef Sutton) (2012)
- The Death Match (with Lee Goldberg and Christa Faust) (2012)
- The Black Death (with Lee Goldberg and Aric Davis) (2012)
- The Killing Floor (with Lee Goldberg and David Tully) (2012)
- Colder Than Hell (with Lee Goldberg and Anthony Neil Smith) (Jan 2013)
- Evil to Burn (with Lee Goldberg and Lisa Klink) (March 2013)
- Streets of Blood (with Lee Goldberg and Barry Napier) (June 2013)
- Crucible of Fire (with Lee Goldberg and Mel Odom) (2013)
- The Dark Need (with Lee Goldberg and Stant Litore) (2013)
- The Rising Dead (with Lee Goldberg and Stella Green) (2014)
- Reborn (with Lee Goldberg, Kate Danley, Phoef Sutton, and Lisa Klink) (2014)

=== Psych Tie-Ins ===
- A Mind Is a Terrible Thing to Read (2008)
- Mind Over Magic (2009)
- The Call of the Mild (2010)
- A Fatal Frame of Mind (2010)
- Mind-Altering Murder (2011)

=== Non-fiction ===
- Science Fiction Film-Making in the 1980s (1994) – co-written with Lee Goldberg, Randy & Jean-Marc Lofficier
- Dreamweavers: Fantasy Film-Making in the 1980s (1994) – co-written with Lee Goldberg, Randy & Jean-Marc Lofficier
- Successful Television Writing (2003) – co-written with Lee Goldberg
- Writing the Pilot (2011)
- Writing the Pilot: Creating the Series (2017)

== Filmography ==
| Year | Title | Role/Job | # of Episodes Written/ Notes |
|---|---|---|---|
| 1987–1988 | Spenser For Hire | Writer | 3 episodes, including the unsold spin-off pilot "Play It Again, Sammy" |
| 1988 | The Highwayman | Writer | 1 episode, "Haunted Highway" |
| 1988–1989 | Murphy's Law | Staff Writer | 5 episodes, ABC TV series starring George Segal based on the "Trace" and "Digger" books by Warren Murphy |
| 1989 | Hunter | Writer, Story Editor | 1 episode, "On Air" |
| 1989–1990 | Baywatch | Writer, Executive Story Editor | 4 episodes, including the final NBC episode, entitled "The End," before the series went into first-run syndication |
| 1990–1991 | She-Wolf of London | Writer, Supervising Producer | 11 episodes |
| 1991–1992 | Likely Suspects | Writer, Supervising Producer | 5 episodes, including "Smells Like Teen Spirit," an Edgar Award Finalist for Best Teleplay |
| 1993–1994 | Cobra | Writer, Supervising Producer | 7 episodes |
| 1994–1995 | Diagnosis: Murder | Writer | 6 episodes |
| 1995 | The Cosby Mysteries | Writer, Supervising Producer | 2 episodes |
| 1995 | Sliders | Writer | 1 episodes, “Prince of Wails” |
| 1995 | Deadly Games | Writer | 2 episodes, "The Boss" and "The Car Mechanic" |
| 1995 | Stick With Me, Kid | Writer, Supervising producer | 3 episodes |
| 1995 | SeaQuest DSV | Writer, Supervising producer | 3 episodes |
| 1995 | The Greatest Shows You Never Saw | Writer, producer | CBS TV Special |
| 1995–1996 | Flipper | Writer | 2 episodes |
| 1996–1998 | Diagnosis: Murder | Writer, Supervising Producer, Executive Producer | 26 episodes |
| 1999 | Martial Law | Writer, executive producer | 3 episodes |
| 2001–2002 | A Nero Wolfe Mystery | Writer | 6 episodes, including "Prisoners Base," an Edgar Award Finalist for Best Teleplay |
| 2002 | The Nightmare Room | Writer | 1 episode, “My Name is Evil” |
| 2003 | She Spies | Writer | 1 Episode, "Crossed Out" |
| 2003–2005 | 1-800-Missing aka Missing | Writer / Supervising Producer | 8 episodes |
| 2003–2006 | Monk | Writer | 3 episodes “Mr. Monk Can’t See a Thing”, “Mr. Monk Meets the Godfather,” “Mr. Monk Goes to Mexico” |
| 2004 | The Best TV Shows That Never Were | Writer, executive producer | ABC TV Special |
| 2007 | Psych | Writer | 1 episode, “Forget Me Not” |
| 2010–2012 | The Glades | Writer | 3 episodes |
| 2020 | Dream Raider | Writer | 8 episodes, HBO Max series |
