= Barry Van Dyke =

American actor (born 1951)

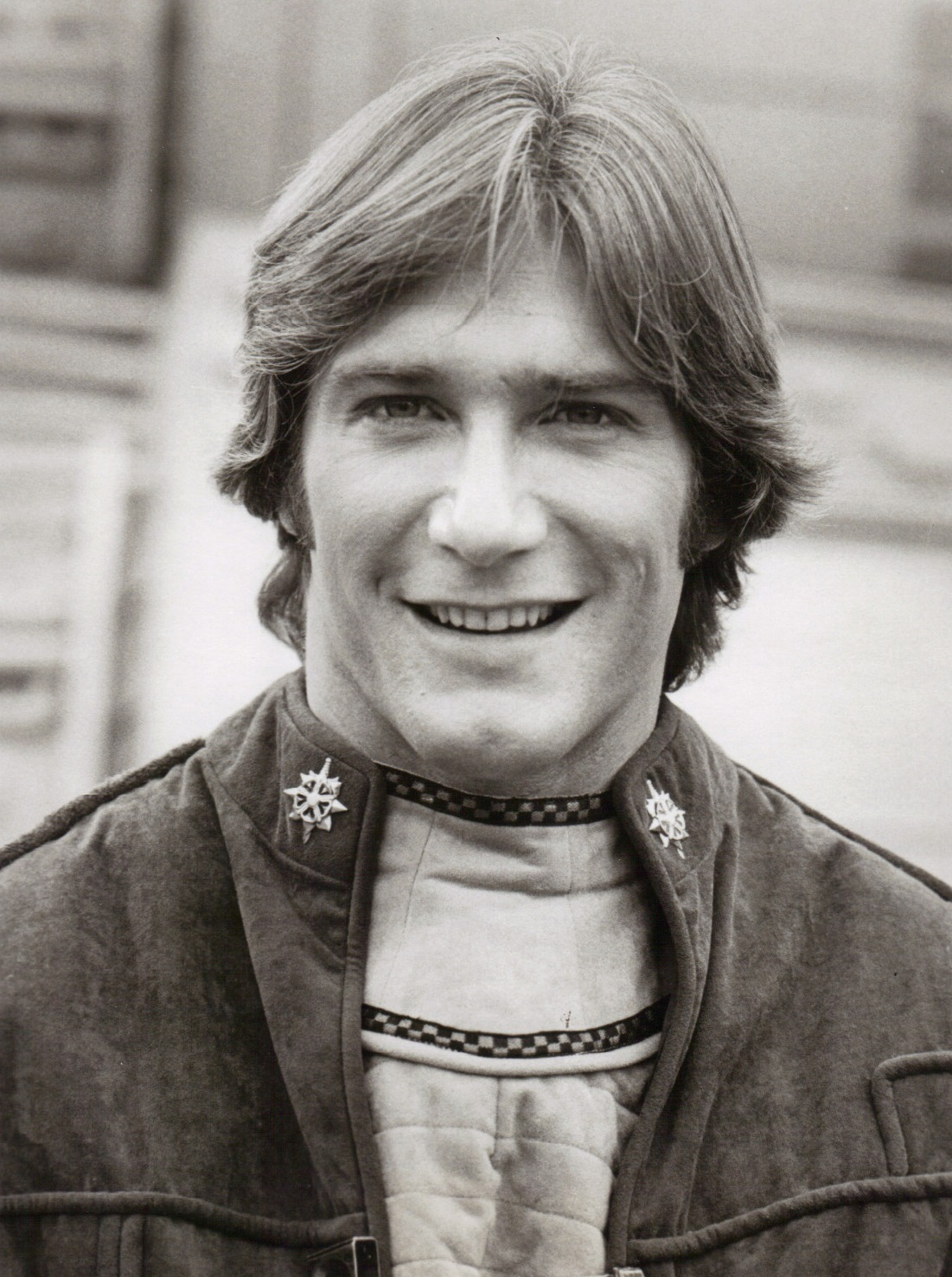
- Van Dyke as Lt. Dillon in Galactica 1980
- Born: July 31, 1951 (age 75); Atlanta, Georgia, U.S.
- Occupations: Actor, writer, director, presenter
- Years active: 1962; 1971–present
- Spouse: Mary Carey (m. 1974)
- Children: 4, including Shane
- Father: Dick Van Dyke
- Relatives: Jerry Van Dyke (uncle); Kelly Jean Van Dyke (cousin)

Barry Van Dyke (born July 31, 1951) is an American actor. He is the second son of actor and entertainer Dick Van Dyke and Margie Willett, and the nephew of Jerry Van Dyke. He has often worked with his father. He is best known to audiences as Lieutenant Detective Steve Sloan, a homicide detective and the son of Dr. Mark Sloan (played by Dick Van Dyke) on Diagnosis: Murder. In the show, the characters' relatives were frequently played by real-life family members.

== Biography ==
Barry Van Dyke was born in Atlanta, Georgia, the son of Dick Van Dyke (born 1925) and his first wife, Margie Willett (1927–2008).

Van Dyke's television debut was as Florian, a violin-toting nine-year-old in "The Talented Neighborhood" episode of The Dick Van Dyke Show alongside big brother Christian. However, his father advised him to wait before pursuing a show business career. Van Dyke later told a reporter, "He wanted me to have my childhood. He told me that if I still wanted to act after I graduated high school, then it would be OK."

Later, he worked as a gofer on his father's television series, The New Dick Van Dyke Show, which debuted in 1971 and aired until 1974. While working on that show, he secured a part as an extra.

He worked with his father again in the short-lived series The Van Dyke Show (which was canceled after six episodes in 1988) and then the long-running series Diagnosis: Murder, which aired from 1993 to 2001. In both series, he had major roles. He also wrote and directed several episodes of Diagnosis: Murder. After Diagnosis: Murder ended, Barry appeared in the Murder 101 television films, again alongside his father.

Barry Van Dyke also appeared in many other television shows over the course of his long career. His other television work includes a starring role in Galactica 1980 as Lieutenant Dillon, and appearances in Remington Steele; The Love Boat; Magnum, P.I.; The Dukes of Hazzard; as Ace Combat Pilot and former M.I.A. soldier St. John Hawke in the final season of Airwolf; The A-Team; Gun Shy; Murder, She Wrote; Mork & Mindy; and The Redd Foxx Show.

== Marriage and children ==
In 1974, he married Mary Carey; the couple have four children: Carey (born February 25, 1976), Shane (born August 28, 1979), Wes (born October 22, 1984), and Taryn (born June 1, 1986).

== Filmography ==
Year	Title	Role	Notes
1961	Hazel	Kid playing football on playground (uncredited)	Episode: "Hazel and the Playground"
1962	The Dick Van Dyke Show	Florian	Episode: "The Talented Neighborhood"
1971–1974	The New Dick Van Dyke Show	Various characters	7 episodes
1976	Stalk the Wild Child	Volleyball Player	TV movie
1976	Gemini Man	Steward	Episode: "Escape Hatch"
1976	Van Dyke and Company	Computer Date #1	Episode #1.6
1977	Wonder Woman	Freddy	Episode: "Wonder Woman in Hollywood"
1977	Tabitha	Roger Bennett	Episode: "Tabitha"
1977	Ants	Richard Cyril	TV movie
1978	The Harvey Korman Show	Stuart Stafford	Main cast (5 episodes)
1978	Eight Is Enough	Larry Phenton	Episode: "Cinderella's Understudy"
1978	Mork & Mindy	Dan Phillips	Episode: "A Mommy for Morky"
1978	What's Up, Doc?	Howard Bannister	TV pilot
1979	The MacKenzies of Paradise Cove	Eric	Episode: "Bridget's Romance"
1980	Galactica 1980	Lt. Dillon	Main cast (10 episodes)
1980	Casino	Edge	TV movie
1980	The Love Boat	Scott Hanson	Episode: "Boomerang
1981	Ghost of a Chance	Wayne Clifford	TV pilot
1982	The Powers of Matthew Star	Coach Curtis	Episodes: "Winning" and "Endurance"
1982	Remington Steele	Creighton Phillips	Episode: "Steele Belted"
1982	Foxfire Light	Linc Wilder	Feature film
1983	Magnum, P.I.	Duke Davis	Episode: "The Big Blow"
1983	Gun Shy	Russell Donovan	Main cast (6 episodes)
1983	The Love Boat	Joey Gardiner	Episode: "When the Magic Disappears"
1984	The A-Team	Dr. Brian Lefcourt	Episodes: "The Bend in the River" (Part 1 & 2)
1984	The Dukes of Hazzard	Brock Curtis	Episode: "The Dukes in Hollywood"
1984	Mr. Mom	Jack Butler	TV pilot
1985	The Canterville Ghost	John Otis	TV movie
1985	The Love Boat	Roger DeConte	Episode: "Love Times Two"
1986	The Redd Foxx Show	Sgt. Dwight Stryker	Recurring role (4 episodes)
1986	T. J. Hooker	George Collins	Episode: "Shootout"
1986	The Love Boat	Brandon Cobb	Episode: "Hello Emily / The Tour Guide / The Winner Number"
1987	Airwolf	St. John Hawke	Main cast; Season 4 (24 episodes)
1988	The Van Dyke Show	Matt Burgess	Main cast (10 episodes)
1990	Full House	Eric Trent	Episode: "No More Mr. Dumb Guy"
1990	Murder, She Wrote	Buddy Black	Episode: "How to Make a Killing Without Really Trying"
1991	She-Wolf of London	Alan Decker	Episode: "Habeas Corpses"
1992	Diagnosis of Murder	Detective Steve Sloan	Diagnosis: Murder (TV film series)
1992	The House on Sycamore Street	Detective Steve Sloan	Diagnosis: Murder (TV film series)
1993	A Twist of the Knife	Detective Steve Sloan	Diagnosis: Murder (TV film series)
1993–2001	Diagnosis: Murder	Detective Steve Sloan	Main cast (178 episodes)
2002	A Town Without Pity	Detective Steve Sloan	Diagnosis: Murder (TV film series)
2002	Without Warning	Detective Steve Sloan	Diagnosis: Murder (TV film series)
2006	Murder 101	Mike Bryant	Murder 101 (TV film series)
2007	College Can Be Murder	Mike Bryant	Murder 101 (TV film series)
2007	If Wishes Were Horses	Mike Bryant	Murder 101 (TV film series)
2008	The Locked Room Mystery	Mike Bryant	Murder 101 (TV film series)
2008	Light Years Away	Colonel Burke	Feature film (released 2015)
2010	6 Guns	Frank Allison	Direct-to-video film
2012	Strawberry Summer (Hallmark title) Easy Heart (Pixl title)	Jim Landon	TV movie
2015	Dad Dudes	Principal Miller	Episode: "Pilot"
2019	Heavenly Deposit	Roland	Feature film
2019	The Untold Story	Edward	Feature film
