= Christian I. Nyby II =

American television director

Christian Ib Nyby
- Born: June 1, 1941 (age 84); Los Angeles, California, US
- Occupation: Television director
- Years active: 1972 – present
- Parent(s): Christian Nyby; Thelma Litscher

Christian I. Nyby II (born Christian Ib Nyby June 1, 1941) is an American television director, son of film editor and director Christian Nyby.

== Education ==
Nyby graduated from Van Nuys High School in Van Nuys, California, in 1959. He attended the University of Idaho for two years before transferring to the University of Southern California.

== Career ==
Nyby was sent to South Vietnam as a photographer for the United States Air Force in 1963.

In 1967, Nyby became an assistant director for Ironside, and by 1972 received his first directing credits for Ironside episode "Find a Victim", and Adam-12 episode "The Tip". Nyby went on to direct multiple episodes of Emergency!, Battlestar Galactica, B. J. and the Bear, CHiPs, The A-Team, The Fall Guy, Hill Street Blues, Diagnosis: Murder and Walker, Texas Ranger. Tales of the Gold Monkey and the pilot episode of the unsold 1988 Remo Williams series. Nyby also directed numerous Perry Mason television movies in the late 1980s and early 1990s. Nyby's father, Christian Nyby, also a television director (as well as a film editor and director) directed multiple episodes of the original Perry Mason series.

== Personal life ==
Nyby married Susan Keenan in 1963.
