= Joyce Burditt =

American writer and network executive (1938–2022)

- Joyce Burditt, from the jacket of a 1977 edition of The Cracker Factory
- Born: Joyce Ellen Rebeta; September 12, 1938; Cleveland, Ohio, U.S.
- Died: June 2, 2022 (aged 83); Los Angeles, California, U.S.
- Occupations: Writer and network executive
- Spouse: George Burditt (m. 1957)
- Children: 3, including Jack Burditt
- Writing career
- Notable works: Diagnosis: Murder, Perry Mason, Matlock, The Cracker Factory

Joyce Burditt (September 12, 1938 – June 2, 2022), also known as Joyce Rebeta-Burditt, was an American writer and network executive. She was known for creating the TV series Diagnosis: Murder. She was also a longtime writer and producer on such TV series as Perry Mason, Matlock, and the Father Dowling Mysteries. She wrote a best selling novel, The Cracker Factory, in 1977, about an alcoholic housewife, partly drawn from her own experiences.

== Early life and education ==
Joyce Ellen Rebeta was born in Cleveland, Ohio, the daughter of Paul John Rebeta and Coletta Ellen Rebeta (later Supp). Both of her parents were also born in Cleveland. After moving to Southern California in 1969, she took classes at Los Angeles Valley Junior College.

== Career ==
Burditt was known for creating the TV series Diagnosis: Murder, which ran for almost 200 episodes and TV movies. She was also a longtime writer and producer on such TV series as Perry Mason, Matlock, and the Father Dowling Mysteries. Burditt was a programming executive for comedy at ABC, serving as a liaison between the network and sitcom productions including Barney Miller and Soap. Her last television writing credit was on seven episodes of Mystery Woman (2005–2006), a series of films for the Hallmark Channel, starring Kellie Martin.

She wrote a best selling novel, The Cracker Factory, in 1977, about an alcoholic housewife, which is partly drawn from her own experiences with alcoholism and institutionalization. It was made into an American TV movie of the same name. This was followed by the sequel, The Cracker Factory 2: Welcome to Women's Group, in 2010. She wrote the humorous novel Triplets, in 1981, and the mystery novel Buck Naked, about a Los Angeles detective heroine, in 1996.

== Publications ==
- The Cracker Factory (1977)
- Triplets (1981)
- Buck Naked (1996)
- The Cracker Factory 2: Welcome to the Women's Group (2010)

== Personal life ==
Rebeta married the writer George Burditt in 1957 and had three children. They later divorced. Her son Jack Burditt became a screenwriter. On June 2, 2022, she died in Los Angeles. Her grave is in the San Fernando Mission Cemetery in Mission Hills.
