= Diagnosis: Murder season 7 =

Diagnosis: Murder
- Season 7
- No. of episodes: 24

Release
- Original network: CBS
- Original release: September 23, 1999 – May 11, 2000

Season chronology
- ← Previous; Season 6 Next → Season 8

Diagnosis: Murder's seventh season originally aired from September 23, 1999, to May 11, 2000. The season was released on DVD complete and available in two parts by Visual Entertainment, Inc.

== Cast ==
- Dick Van Dyke as Dr. Mark Sloan
- Victoria Rowell as Dr. Amanda Bentley
- Charlie Schlatter as Dr. Jesse Travis
- Barry Van Dyke as Steve Sloan

== Episodes ==
| No. overall | No. in season | Title | Directed by | Written by | Original release date | U.S. viewers (millions) |
|---|---|---|---|---|---|---|
| 133 | 1 | "The Roast" | Christopher Hibler | Mark Solomon | September 23, 1999 | 11.70 |
Dr. Mark Sloan is to be the guest of 'honor' as Man of the Year at the Roast, where comedians makes merciless fun of him in the Jokers Club. Andy Baxter, a sideman, makes an unexpected appearance and grossly insults the speaker, Lou Summers. A brief power surge blankets the room in darkness and when the lights come back on, Baxter falls over dead with a knife in the back. Lou is later found bludgeoned to death in the bathroom. Guest stars: Dick Martin, Tim Conway, David Leisure, Steve Allen, Jayne Meadows, Tom Poston, Ted Danson and Julia Duffy
| 134 | 2 | "Sleeping Murder" | Ron Satlof | Chris Abbott | September 30, 1999 | 12.19 |
When a businessman runs through the streets to shoot an apparent nobody in clear daylight, Steve is puzzled. Dr. Mark is even more surprised when his younger brother, Stacy (Jerry Van Dyke), appears after a drive all the way from Arkansas for a free medical consult about bad back pain. Stacy is also found to have relapsed into a dangerous childhood habit of sleepwalking, placing him in suspicious circumstances at the scenes of both a murder and an attempted murder. Note: This episode marks the first appearance of three recurring characters, Dr. Madison 'Maddie' Wesley (Joanna Cassidy), Alex Smith (Shane Van Dyke), and Detective Cheryl Banks (Charmin Lee).
| 135 | 3 | "Bringing Up Barbie" | Ron Satlof | Steve Brown | October 7, 1999 | 11.99 |
Dr. Mark is at BBQ Bob's talking on the phone to Dr. Jesse. Jesse is spending the day patiently babysitting Amanda's exuberant young son, CJ. While talking to Mark, Jesse reveals that Nurse Susan Hilliard, his previous girlfriend, has now moved to Oregon “with a chiropractor”. On his way out of the restaurant, Mark is delighted to recognise Chuck Greer, who once saved Steve's life in Vietnam, and happily agrees to minding Chuck's teenage daughter, Barbie, for a few hours. Barbie also proves to be quite a handful. But Mark's babysitting of Barbie turns out to be far more perilous than Jesse's babysitting of CJ. Note: This episode marks the first appearance of Steve's new (unnamed) Captain (John Schuck).
| 136 | 4 | "Murder at Midterm" | Christopher Hibler | Melody Fox & Marc Cushman | October 14, 1999 | 12.24 |
Dr. Mark Sloan is delivering a lecture to a class of final year students at Community General Medical School. While speaking, he appears to gradually become unwell and then collapses in front of the entire class. The group of soon-to-be doctors speculate in an attempt to accurately diagnose the complaint when Quinn Montgomery, one of the brighter students, concludes that Dr. Sloan is in fact, faking his symptoms as a practical test for the class. Dr. Sloan immediately 'recovers' and congratulates Quinn for his cool-headed deduction. But we quickly learn that although Quinn is a gifted student, he is also a deceitful two-timer. He is engaged to heiress Jennifer Warner while also seeing Nurse Holly Harris. When Holly informs Quinn that she is pregnant, he realises that the prospect of his brilliant career as a doctor married to a wealthy wife, is in distinct danger of disappearing unless he can excise the problem… Guest Stars: Jonathan Scarfe, Joanna Cassidy and Renee Humphrey
| 137 | 5 | "The Flame" | Christian I. Nyby II | Joel Steiger | October 21, 1999 | 12.71 |
While Dr. Jesse is out jogging, he sees smoke billowing from a domestic garage. He manages to break in, but unfortunately, is too late to save Frank Baumgart - an apparent suicide victim. Baumgart's former boss, John Parkinson, is later arrested by Steve, on suspicion of murder made to look like a suicide. All of this is complicated by the fact that John happens to be married to Livia, the first woman Mark developed feelings for after his wife died. In addition, Livia previously had an affair with the deceased. The evidence against John seems overwhelming but he argues his innocence so passionately it causes Dr. Mark to question the evidence and his own unconscious bias. Guest Stars: Michelle Phillips, Ray Wise, Charmin Lee
| 138 | 6 | "The Killer Within" | Frank Thackery | Terry Curtis Fox | October 28, 1999 | 13.60 |
Dr. Madison Wesley discovers Lisa, a medical student and Madison's de facto stepdaughter, after Lisa has overdosed on Demerol. The concerned Madison convinces Dr. Mark to pull some strings to get Lisa into Community General's highly regarded narcotics rehab program. The self-loathing Lisa has difficulty getting along with the other members in the group therapy sessions. Fellow addict and ambitious actress, Kiki, is particularly hostile when she detects an attraction between Lisa and another rehab patient, Tommy Santini. When Lisa realises that the Senior Therapist, Dr. Carla Meyer, follows sloppy procedure when issuing prescribed medicationsshe manages to steal a dose of Demerol. Sometime later, when Lisa comes to, she discovers Tommy's dead body. Dr. Amanda determines that Tommy's cause of death was a Demerol overdose - but it was widely known that Tommy was in rehab due to marijuana and alcohol abuse. Lisa pleads ignorance of the crime, but Dr. Carla ejects her from the program and then she is arrested by Steve. Meanwhile, a stellar review in the newspaper means that BBQ Bob's is besieged by trend-following 'foodies' and business booms. But Dr. Jesse has trouble maintaining a sense of proportion between his work and his wildly popular establishment. Guest stars: Joanna Cassidy, Lisa Sheridan, Lauren Dahl and Bruce A. Young
| 139 | 7 | "Gangland" | Victor Lobl | Terry Curtis Fox | November 4, 1999 | 13.86 |
| 140 | 8 | "Gangland" | Victor Lobl | Terry Curtis Fox | November 4, 1999 | 13.86 |
Old-school mob boss, 'Mr. G', who happens to be a perfect Mark Sloan lookalike, is released from prison. His gang, now under the leadership of his daughter Maya (Susan Gibney) and her right hand man Eddie Michaels (David Marciano), has shifted location to California and rented a Malibu beach-house. Maya has a plan to make all 'the family's' future businesses legitimate. Her principal project is a theme park, located on a bluff near Malibu, which will utilise state of the art virtual reality to recreate notorious shoot-outs from the history of America's underworld. Dr. Mark, meanwhile, is hoping that the same exact location, presently an old-fashioned children's pony riding attraction, can be used as the perfect site for Community General's planned 'Wellness Center'. There is a deep distrust between 'Mr. G' and Maya. Each suspects the other of being responsible for the murder of Mr. G's only son - and heir apparent – while 'Mr. G' was serving time. Given that Dr. Mark and 'Mr. G' look identical, they are mistaken for each other several times in the two episodes. At first these cases of mistaken identity are comical but then turn potentially deadly when 'Mr. G' becomes a target. Also starring: Kathleen Lloyd
| 141 | 9 | "The Mouth That Roared" | Terrence O'Hara | Cathryn Michon | November 11, 1999 | 11.79 |
During an appearance on Donny and Marie Osmond's TV chat show, radio shock-jock, Denise Steiner, declares (in jest) that she would have to kill her birth mother - who had given her up - if she found her after all these years. Later, while Dr. Mark is her radio guest, she receives a call from someone claiming to be her mom. Denise dismisses it, but after the show her producer reveals that the caller, Joanne Lombardi, knew about Denise's birthmark and the heart valve problem she had as an infant. But we know that Joanne has been receiving threatening phone calls from someone unknown. Overcoming her own cynicism, Denise visits Joanne and comes to believe that she really is her birth mother. Later, Denise receives old newspaper clippings that may implicate Joanne in a scandal involving betraying illegal immigrant families. She goes to see Joanne to confront her but discovers her dead body. After Denise is arrested by Steve, Mark fills in as presenter of her radio show – which allows him to investigate those at the radio station who may have a grudge against Denise. Guest stars: Christine Tucci, Mark Adair-Rios and Alyson Croft
| 142 | 10 | "The Seven Deadly Sins" | Christopher Hibler | Chris Abbott & Steve Brown | November 18, 1999 | 11.50 |
The seven deadly sins of the title refer to seven jewels that were crafted for Nicholas II, the last Tsar of Russia. Each jewel bears an individual name such as gluttony, wrath, lust etc. A lady thief, posing as a fine arts detective from Scotland Yard, inserts herself into a murder case that involved the theft of one of the 'deadly sins'. Dr. Mark sees through this fake identity fairly quickly but is strangely sympathetic towards the connoisseur thief, while Steve is much less sympathetic. It transpires that the suspect in the murder case is Grant Connor, the protégé of our lady thief. The final remaining 'sin' is shortly due to be auctioned to benefit Community General Hospital. With two world class thieves targeting the event, can the final 'sin' be protected and sold before one of the thieves outwits the authorities? Guest stars: Stephanie Zimbalist, Philip Casnoff and Guy Siner
| 143 | 11 | "Santa Claude" | Nancy Malone | Burt Prelutsky & Steve Brown | December 16, 1999 | 12.01 |
A flashback shows a convict desperately running through the woods. We can hear tracker dogs hot on his trail. He manages to break the window of a truck, hotwire it and drive off. In the present, it is Christmas time at Community General Hospital. Claude Campbell, the hospital's janitor, tells Dr. Mark that he is looking forward to playing Santa Claus for the children, but he suddenly collapses. After tests, it is Mark informs Claude that he has pancreatic cancer, with six months to live, but Claude's response is remarkably calm. Claude's humility galvanises Mark and Steve into seeking any benefit or program that will make his last months' more bearable. Their research turns up the unfortunate fact that Claude (not his real name) is an escaped convict. He was serving time for murdering his wife in St Louis. Mark, disbelieving that such a gentle person could commit murder, sets up a hypnotic regression session for Claude. What Claude recalls while under hypnosis, results in Steve flying to St Louis to re-investigate the 13-year-old case. Guest stars: Leon Russom, Joanna Cassidy, Richard Riehle and Joyce Brothers (as herself).
| 144 | 12 | "Man Overboard" | Frank Thackery | Michael Lyons | January 6, 2000 | 13.26 |
It is a very busy shift at Community General Hospital. Doctors Mark, Amanda and Jesse feel run off their feet – and Steve is facing the prospect of a double shift at the precinct too. Mark accepts an offer to fill in for a cruise ship's medical staff on a short cruise off the California coast. One of the passengers, irascible millionaire Robert Brantigan and his family, come to the attention of our three MDs due to him receiving an overdose of his prescribed insulin. Later, Brantigan's wife, Clare, reports him missing. Initially, what has occurred appears straightforward, but information that comes to Steve indicates that an almost exact incident occurred some years earlier, meaning that we are dealing with a serial killer and the threat that Dr. Mark represents to the killer means that his life is in danger. Guest stars: Brynn Thayer, Nick Tate and Allison Mackie
| 145 | 13 | "Frontier Dad" | Frank Thackery | Story by : Paul Vincent Picerni & Barry Van Dyke; Teleplay by : Barry Van Dyke | January 13, 2000 | 12.53 |
Dr. Mark Sloan has been invited to the set of 'Frontier Dad', a TV series about a family-friendly old west hero, Dash. Dr. Amanda and her two sons together with Dr. Jesse, Steve and the biggest fan of the show, Alex Smith, have all gone with him. Tragically, they all get to witness the fatal fall of an ambitious stunt performer. Back at Community General, they piece together that the stunt was sabotaged and that the widely disliked star of the show, Carl Simpson, was the likely intended victim. In order to uncover the murderer, Steve goes undercover as Carl's stunt-double and Jesse gets a gig as the production's medic. Guest stars: Robert Fuller, Anne Lockhart, Jeff MacKay and Sal Viscuso.
| 146 | 14 | "Too Many Cooks" | Christopher Hibler | Joyce Burditt | January 20, 2000 | 13.80 |
A famous chef is killed at a charity auction while eating one of his own creations, a dish poisoned by a competitor at a popular food network. Guest stars: Ken Kercheval, Harriet Sansom Harris and Alastair Duncan
| 147 | 15 | "Jake's Women" | Victor Lobl | Mark Solomon | February 3, 2000 | 14.35 |
Dr. Mark Sloan is shocked to discover that his friend is in a bigamous marriage. Meanwhile, Steve tries to find a balance between investigating Jake's murder and a special new friendship. Guest stars: Molly Cheek and Cristine Rose.
| 148 | 16 | "Murder by Remote" | Christopher Hibler | Terry Curtis Fox | February 10, 2000 | 13.28 |
Noisy construction work drives Steve crazy and he decides to move out of the beach-house, making his dad nostalgic. Steve's new house has its security system installed by a shady home security mogul, who claims that his rival has been sabotaging his system. But that is only the beginning. Guest stars: Jonathan Banks, Dan Lauria, Melissa Greenspan and Charmin Lee
| 149 | 17 | "Teacher's Pet" | Vince McEveety | Joel Steiger | February 17, 2000 | 13.64 |
When trainee doctor Mickey Hoving is found murdered at Dr. Sloan's home, his wife, Jill, testifies that a gang of robbers broke into the house and killed him but left her alive. However, details of an extramarital affair soon begin to emerge and contradict her version of events. Guest stars: Brigid Brannagh, Robin Thomas, Joanna Cassidy and Kevin Sizemore
| 150 | 18 | "The Unluckiest Bachelor in L.A." | Bernie Kowalski | Cathryn Michon | February 24, 2000 | 13.55 |
Despite his clumsy and willful appearance, his honesty gets Steve picked in a TV dating show by candidate Lily Wilson. Everything goes well between the two until she is murdered. A corrupt private investigator and Lily's long estranged brother, a doctor at Community General, become suspect. Guest stars: Challen Cates, Jim Ortlieb and Kim Greist
| 151 | 19 | "A Resting Place" | Farhad Mann | Story by : Charlie Schlatter & Craig Tomashoff; Teleplay by : Burt Prelutsky | April 6, 2000 | 11.52 |
Steve's retired colleague Dave 'Hawk' Hawkins is murdered while undercover in the rest home 'Sunny Meadows'. Dr. Mark goes undercover and uncovers a hidden secret about one of the deceased patients. Guest stars: James Greene, Charlotte Rae and Lee Weaver
| 152 | 20 | "Murder at BBQ Bob's" | Victor Lobl | Paul Bishop | April 20, 2000 | 11.47 |
While US Marines Captain Paul Davis, Lieutenant Richard Martinelli -an MP- and Lt. Jean Romanski are eating at BBQ Bob's during Jesse's shift, Captain Hank Thomas bursts in saying "You'll all be sorry" and shoots himself in the head. When Steve and a Naval Investigator investigate, they discover Thomas's personal life which included an affair with his commanding officer's wife, among other things. They deduce he might have been murdered. Question is, how? Guest stars: Mark Valley, Alexandra Hedison and Jenya Lano
| 153 | 21 | "Two Birds With One Sloan" | Nancy Malone | Terry Curtis Fox | April 27, 2000 | 11.99 |
Wheelchair user, Saul Singer, has a car accident but Dr. Mark gets him (by ambulance) to TV presenter Drew McIntyre's trivia quiz "Through the Roof" where he is breaking the earnings records - because he blackmails Drew to hand over the answers in advance. But when Singer suddenly dies on air, Mark poses as a contestant to uncover the culprit. Guest stars: John Griffin, Allyce Beasley and Ken Lerner
| 154 | 22 | "Swan Song" | Victor Lobl | Joel Steiger | May 4, 2000 | 11.48 |
Danielle Marsh, a famous jazz musician and old friend of Dr. Mark Sloan, arrives in LA for a performance, but she starts to display uncharacteristic paranoid behaviour. She also insists that a threatening figure is following her. Guest stars: Helen Reddy, Melissa Greenspan, Gina Hecht and David Graf
| 155 | 23 | "Out of the Past" | Victor Lobl | Steve Brown | May 11, 2000 | 10.80 |
| 156 | 24 | "Getting Mad, Getting Even" | Donald L. Gold | Burt Prelutsky | May 11, 2000 | 10.80 |
When a girl cop is brought in wounded, Jesse patches her up and dates her, but as Amanda finds and brings her out, she sets him up for a staged scary ride. Also, intern Alex reunites with an old flame, who had connections to a well-known call girl. Two weeks later, Brett Hayward murders Dr. Hjortsberg, the plastic surgeon who created his present identity, knowing him as patient Eddie Dagabosian, and as such harbors something against Madison, with whom he moves in, but Steve's LAPD team finds the drugs the killer 'stole' in a nearby dumpster. Meanwhile, Jesse is accused of writing a tell-all book about Community General and its staff. Guest Stars: Joanna Cassidy and John Schneider.
