= Diagnosis: Murder season 8 =

Diagnosis: Murder
- Season 8
- No. of episodes: 22

Release
- Original network: CBS
- Original release: October 12, 2000 – May 11, 2001

Season chronology
- ← Previous; Season 7

Diagnosis: Murder's eighth and final season originally aired from October 12, 2000, to May 11, 2001.

== Cast ==
- Dick Van Dyke as Dr. Mark Sloan
- Victoria Rowell as Dr. Amanda Bentley
- Charlie Schlatter as Dr. Jesse Travis
- Barry Van Dyke as Steve Sloan

== Episodes ==
No. overall	No. in season	Title	Directed by	Written by	Original release date	U.S. viewers (millions)
157	1	"Death By Design"	Christopher Hibler	Mark Egan	October 12, 2000	7.93
A friend hired to revamp Mark's office ends up dead, wrapped up in a roll of carpet, and the murderer's trail leads all the way to Egypt.
158	2	"Blind Man's Bluff"	Frank Thackery	Joel Steiger	October 19, 2000	8.43
A man caught between his wife and his lover is suddenly found murdered. The finger is initially pointed in the direction of the lover, because the wife is blind and presumed to have been unable to do the awful deed.
159	3	"Sleight-of-Hand"	Nancy Malone	Mark Solomon	October 26, 2000	8.40
Mark's magic instructor turns up dead after an apparent surfing accident, but Mark suspects the deceased's twin brother may have been the one with a trick up his sleeve.
160	4	"By Reason of Insanity"	Sandy Smolan	Terry Curtis Fox	November 2, 2000	8.39
Mark comes to the defense of his schizophrenic former student, who can't explain his alibi after being charged with murder.
161	5	"The Patient Detective"	Victor Lobl	Stephen A. Miller	November 9, 2000	7.77
Dr. Sloan's son Steve nearly dies in a traffic accident then claims to have seen murder take place in his hospital room. Although the man seemingly died of natural causes, it's quickly revealed to be more than it seems.
162	6	"The Cradle Will Rock"	Victor Lobl	Joel Steiger	November 16, 2000	8.56
Mark discovers that an impassioned love affair between a nurse and a 17-year-old hospital worker may be the motive for murder.
163	7	"Hot House"	Victor Lobl	Terry Curtis Fox	November 23, 2000	8.46
To investigate a possible murder, Dr. Sloan goes into a house of roommates who are monitored 24 hours a day by cameras for a national television show. He soon discover the victim had a history of abuse not just to his cast members, but his family too.
164	8	"All Dressed Up and Nowhere to Die"	Bernie Kowalski	Terry Curtis Fox	November 30, 2000	8.12
Mark gets wrapped up in the world of high fashion and designer drugs while tracking down the person responsible for planting a bomb that killed his friend on his wedding day.
165	9	"Confession"	Donald L. Gold	Chris Abbott & Steve Brown	December 7, 2000	9.11
A priest listens to the confession of a killer, but won't reveal who the killer is due to confidentiality and becomes the prime suspect himself after evidence points to him. Mark decides to go undercover to help clear the priest's name.
166	10	"Playing God"	Christian I. Nyby II	Burt Prelutsky	December 14, 2000	11.06
Someone kills a medical student, drains his blood and stores the corpse in the Community General morgue.
167	11	"Less Than Zero"	Christian I. Nyby II	Cathryn Michon	March 8, 2001	10.92
Dr. Sloan investigates the demise of a television star who may have died because of compulsive dieting.
168	12	"Sins of the Father: Part 1"	Victor Lobl	Joel Steiger	March 15, 2001	9.48
The shooting death of a patient opens a doorway to Mark's past that forces him to face the disappearance of his father.
169	13	"Sins of the Father: Part 2"	Victor Lobl	Joel Steiger	March 22, 2001	9.82
Mark attempts to discover why his father, a former police detective, vanished more than 50 years earlier, leaving him and his mother to fend for themselves.
170	14	"You Bet Your Life"	Nancy Malone	Burt Prelutsky	March 29, 2001	9.50
When a big-time bookie and a gambling heart surgeon turn up dead, Mark bets that something foul is afoot.
171	15	"Bachelor Fathers"	James Nasella	Steve Brown	April 5, 2001	9.15
Mark takes on the extortionists responsible for murdering the twin sister of a young woman who claims Dr. Travis fathered her infant son.
172	16	"Being of Sound Mind"	Christopher Hibler	Burt Prelutsky	April 12, 2001	9.80
Jesse and Amanda are among six strangers selected as the beneficiaries of a lonely man's will. The others are a medical student, a nurse, a doctor, and a patient's husband. But all stand in the way of a killer who's scheming to get their multi-million dollar inheritance. Meanwhile, Mark is interviewing candidates for the position as his (new) secretary.
173	17	"Dance of Danger"	Christian I. Nyby II	Barry Van Dyke & Jeffrey Glasser	April 19, 2001	8.56
A newspaper reporter goes to Mark for help when she suspects a New Age religion is responsible for the stabbing of her dance partner.
174	18	"The Red Shoes"	Frank Thackery	Victoria Rowell & Fred Fontana	April 26, 2001	8.11
Dr. Sloan tries to help Amanda when she becomes involved in an incident involving the Chinese government.
175	19	"No Good Deed"	Sandy Smolan	Terry Curtis Fox	May 3, 2001	9.57
Dr. Sloan investigates a controversial attorney who confesses to murder while near death but recants after he recovers.
176	20	"Deja Vous"	Christian I. Nyby II	Terry Curtis Fox	May 10, 2001	8.89
Steve begins dating a woman who looks similar to his murdered ex-girlfriend.
177	21	"On the Beach"	Donald L. Gold	Joyce Burditt & Burt Prelutsky	May 17, 2001	9.60
After breaking his leg in a Scooter accident at Community General, Dr Sloan is forced to recuperate at home. While observing his neighbours, Mark notices the unpleasant neighbour who has the habit playing excessively loud music, disposing of something in the ocean. Mark earlier formed the suspicion that the same neighbour may have been abusing his girlfriend, and so realises that the object discreetly disposed of, may have been her body. Additionally, Mark has a new Home-Help Nurse to assist him in his recovery. This new Nurse turns out to be quite a character, even assisting Mark in his investigation.
178	22	"The Blair Nurse Project"	Barry Van Dyke	Carey Van Dyke & Barry Van Dyke	May 24, 2001	6.63
When a filmmaker begins using Community General Hospital as the location for an eerie documentary, Dr. Sloan discovers it may be haunted.
