= List of Diagnosis: Murder episodes =

Diagnosis: Murder is an action comedy/mystery/medical crime drama television series starring Dick Van Dyke as Dr. Mark Sloan, a medical doctor who solves crimes with the help of his son, a homicide detective played by his real-life son Barry Van Dyke. The series began as a spin-off of Jake and the Fatman. The series was created by Joyce Burditt, and originally aired on CBS from October 29, 1993, to May 11, 2001, with a total of 178 episodes aired across eight seasons.

In addition, a total of five Diagnosis: Murder television films were made, with the first three (Diagnosis of Murder, The House on Sycamore Street and A Twist of the Knife) being produced before the television series began. The final two movies (A Town Without Pity and Without Warning) were produced in 2002, after the television series had ended.

== Series overview ==
Season	Episodes	Originally released	
Season	Episodes	First released	Last released
Pilot		March 20, 1991	
Movies 1–2		January 5, 1992	February 13, 1992
Movie 3		February 13, 1993	
1	19	October 29, 1993	May 13, 1994
2	22	September 16, 1994	May 5, 1995
3	18	December 8, 1995	May 3, 1996
4	26	September 19, 1996	May 8, 1997
5	25	September 18, 1997	May 14, 1998
6	22	September 24, 1998	May 13, 1999
7	24	September 23, 1999	May 11, 2000
8	22	October 12, 2000	May 11, 2001
Movies 4–5		February 6, 2002	April 26, 2002

== Episodes ==
=== Pilot (1991) ===
A backdoor pilot for Diagnosis: Murder aired as the 19th episode of the fourth season of Jake and the Fatman. ("No. overall" and "No. in season" for the pilot indicate the position of the episode within the collection of episodes of the originating series.)

No. overall	No. in season	Title	Directed by	Written by	Original air date	U.S. viewers (millions)
79	19	"It Never Entered My Mind"	Bernard L. Kowalski	Joyce Burditt	March 20, 1991	19.7
Dr. Mark Sloan is accused of murdering a hospital administrator, so he starts his own investigation with the help of his medical students.

=== Movies (1992–1993) ===
Film no.	Title	Directed by	Written by	Original release date	U.S. viewers (millions)
1	"Diagnosis of Murder"	Christopher Hibler	Dean Hargrove; Joyce Burditt	January 5, 1992	21.2
2	"The House on Sycamore Street"	Christian I. Nyby II	Bruce Franklin Singer	May 1, 1992	15.6
3	"A Twist of the Knife"	Jerry London	Gerry Conway	February 13, 1993	16.1

=== Season 1 (1993–1994) ===
No. overall	No. in season	Title	Directed by	Written by	Original release date	U.S. viewers (millions)
1	1	"Miracle Cure"	Michael Lange	James Kramer	October 29, 1993	14.6
2	2	"Amnesia"	Michael Lange	Story by : Joyce Burditt and David Hoffman & Leslie Daryl Zerg; Teleplay by : Joyce Burditt	November 5, 1993	12.7
3	3	"Murder at the Telethon"	Anson Williams	Vance DeGeneres	November 12, 1993	12.5
4	4	"Inheritance of Death"	Frank Thackery	Gerry Conway	November 19, 1993	12.4
5	5	"The 13 Million Dollar Man"	Anson Williams	Gordon T. Dawson	December 3, 1993	12.5
6	6	"Vanishing Act: Part 1"	Christian I. Nyby II	Bruce Franklin Singer	December 10, 1993	11.2
7	7	"Vanishing Act: Part 2"	Christian I. Nyby II	Bruce Franklin Singer	December 17, 1993	11.1
8	8	"Shanda's Song"	Neema Barnette	Craig Volk	January 7, 1994	14.8
9	9	"The Restless Remains"	Christian I. Nyby II	Story by : John Hill; Teleplay by : Robert Schlitt	January 14, 1994	16.2
10	10	"Murder with Mirrors"	Anson Williams	Gerry Conway	January 21, 1994	16.8
11	11	"Flashdance with Death"	Christian I. Nyby II	Gerry Conway	January 28, 1994	17.2
12	12	"Reunion with Murder"	Anson Williams	Robin Madden	February 4, 1994	16.3
13	13	"Lily"	Frank Thackery	Gerry Conway	March 4, 1994	16.6
14	14	"Guardian Angel"	Christian I. Nyby II	Bruce Franklin Singer	April 1, 1994	13.3
15	15	"Nirvana"	Christian I. Nyby II	Peter Dunne	April 8, 1994	13.6
16	16	"Broadcast Blues"	Christian I. Nyby II	James Kramer	April 15, 1994	15.3
17	17	"Shaker"	Alan Myerson	Gerry Conway	April 29, 1994	13.6
18	18	"The Plague"	Peter Ellis	Gerry Conway	May 6, 1994	13.9
19	19	"Sister Michael Wants You"	Leo Penn	Joyce Burditt	May 13, 1994	13.7

=== Season 2 (1994–1995) ===
No. overall	No. in season	Title	Directed by	Written by	Original release date	U.S. viewers (millions)
20	1	"Many Happy Returns"	Lou Antonio	Lee Goldberg & William Rabkin	September 16, 1994	14.7
21	2	"A Very Fatal Funeral"	Alan Myerson	Gerry Conway	September 23, 1994	14.9
22	3	"Woman Trouble"	Roy Campanella II	Joyce Burditt	September 30, 1994	14.5
23	4	"The Busy Body"	Vincent McEveety	Dan Wilcox	October 7, 1994	15.3
24	5	"My Four Husbands"	Christian I. Nyby II	Robin Bernheim	October 14, 1994	14.0
25	6	"Murder Most Vial"	Richard Compton	Richard Collins	October 21, 1994	13.6
26	7	"You Can Call Me Johnson"	Christian I. Nyby II	John Wirth	October 28, 1994	14.2
27	8	"Georgia on My Mind"	Peter Ellis	Brad Kern	November 4, 1994	14.8
28	9	"The Last Laugh: Part 1"	Christian I. Nyby II	Lee Goldberg & William Rabkin	November 11, 1994	14.2
29	10	"The Last Laugh: Part 2"	Christian I. Nyby II	Lee Goldberg & William Rabkin	November 18, 1994	15.5
30	11	"Death by Extermination"	Christopher Hibler	Dan Wilcox	December 2, 1994	13.7
31	12	"Standing Eight Count"	Christopher Hibler	Travis Fine	December 9, 1994	13.1
32	13	"The Bela Lugosi Blues"	Lee Philips	Michael Gleason	January 6, 1995	15.8
33	14	"The New Healers"	Christopher Hibler	Lee Goldberg & William Rabkin	January 13, 1995	16.2
34	15	"Call Me Incontestible"	Michael Schultz	Dan Wilcox	January 20, 1995	15.4
35	16	"A Blast from the Past"	Burt Brinckerhoff	Joyce Burditt	February 3, 1995	15.7
36	17	"Playing for Keeps"	Peter Ellis	Gerry Conway	February 10, 1995	14.2
37	18	"Sea No Evil"	Christian I. Nyby II	Lee Goldberg & William Rabkin	February 17, 1995	15.3
38	19	"How to Murder Your Lawyer"	Leo Penn	Michael Gleason	February 24, 1995	13.5
39	20	"Naked Babes"	Christian I. Nyby II	Joyce Burditt	March 31, 1995	13.6
40	21	"Death in the Daytime"	Christian I. Nyby II	Michael Gleason	April 28, 1995	11.9
41	22	"My Baby Is Out of This World"	Christopher Hibler	Richard Collins	May 5, 1995	10.4

=== Season 3 (1995–1996) ===
No. overall	No. in season	Title	Directed by	Written by	Original release date	U.S. viewers (millions)
42	1	"An Innocent Murder"	Vincent McEveety	Cynthia Deming & William Royce	December 8, 1995	13.0
43	2	"Witness to Murder"	Paris Barclay	Story by : Mimi Rothman Schapiro & Bill Wells; Teleplay by : Cynthia Deming & William Royce	December 15, 1995	12.3
44	3	"All-American Murder"	Christian I. Nyby II	Tom Chehak	December 22, 1995	12.2
45	4	"Murder in the Courthouse"	Bruce Kessler	Roger Lowenstein	December 29, 1995	11.9
46	5	"Murder on the Run: Part 1"	Christian I. Nyby II	Story by : Maurice Hurley & Steve Hattman; Teleplay by : Steve Hattman	January 5, 1996	13.4
47	6	"Murder on the Run: Part 2"	Christian I. Nyby II	Story by : Maurice Hurley & Steve Hattman; Teleplay by : Steve Hattman	January 12, 1996	13.0
48	7	"Love Is Murder"	Tom Chehak	Nan Hagan	January 19, 1996	14.0
49	8	"Misdiagnosis Murder"	Christian I. Nyby II	Gerry Conway	January 26, 1996	12.4
50	9	"The Pressure to Murder"	Christopher Hibler	Sibyl Gardner	February 9, 1996	12.2
51	10	"Living on the Streets Can Be Murder"	Christopher Hibler	Carey W. Hayes & Chad Hayes	February 16, 1996	13.2
52	11	"Murder, Murder"	Peter Ellis	Nancy Bond	February 23, 1996	12.2
53	12	"Murder in the Dark"	Bernard L. Kowalski	Joyce Burditt	March 8, 1996	11.4
54	13	"35 Millimeter Murder"	Bruce Seth Green	Steve Hattman	March 29, 1996	12.5
55	14	"The Murder Trade"	Oz Scott	Joyce Burditt	April 5, 1996	13.0
56	15	"Mind Over Murder"	Christian I. Nyby II	Gerry Conway	April 12, 1996	11.8
57	16	"Murder by the Book"	Christopher Hibler	Tom Chehak & Steve Hattman	April 19, 1996	11.6
58	17	"FMurder"	Christian I. Nyby II	Story by : Gerry Conway & Steve Hattman; Teleplay by : Gerry Conway	April 26, 1996	12.0
59	18	"Left-Handed Murder"	Jonathan Frakes	Mark Masuoka	May 3, 1996	11.7

=== Season 4 (1996–1997) ===
No. overall	No. in season	Title	Directed by	Written by	Original release date	U.S. viewers (millions)
60	1	"Murder by Friendly Fire"	Christian I. Nyby II	Gillian Horvath	September 19, 1996	11.5
61	2	"Murder Can Be Contagious"	Vincent McEveety	Lee Goldberg & William Rabkin	September 26, 1996	12.9
62	3	"Murder on Thin Ice"	Christopher Hibler	Robin Madden	October 3, 1996	12.8
63	4	"X Marks the Murder"	Christian I. Nyby II	Lindsay Harrison	October 10, 1996	12.3
64	5	"X Marks the Murder"	Christian I. Nyby II	Lindsay Harrison	October 10, 1996	12.3
65	6	"A Model Murder"	Vincent McEveety	Sam Egan	October 17, 1996	11.8
66	7	"Murder Can Be Murder"	Christian I. Nyby II	Tom Chehak	October 24, 1996	11.5
67	8	"An Explosive Murder"	Steve Miner	Dean Hargrove	October 31, 1996	12.2
68	9	"Murder by the Busload"	Christian I. Nyby II	Lee Goldberg & William Rabkin	November 7, 1996	13.0
69	10	"A Candidate for Murder"	Christopher Hibler	Steve Hattman	November 14, 1996	14.4
70	11	"The ABCs of Murder"	Christian I. Nyby II	Steve Hattman	November 21, 1996	12.6
71	12	"Murder in the Family"	Vincent McEveety	Lindsay Harrison	December 12, 1996	12.5
72	13	"In Defense of Murder"	Vincent McEveety	Joyce Burditt & Gerry Conway	January 9, 1997	13.61
73	14	"A History of Murder"	Christian I. Nyby II	Gerry Conway	January 16, 1997	14.12
74	15	"Murder Two: Part 1"	Christopher Hibler	Gerald Sanoff & Joel Steiger	January 30, 1997	15.73
75	16	"Murder Two: Part 2"	Christopher Hibler	Gerald Sanoff & Joel Steiger	February 6, 1997	15.63
76	17	"Hard-Boiled Murder"	Christian I. Nyby II	Lee Goldberg & William Rabkin	February 13, 1997	15.16
77	18	"Murder, Country Style"	Christopher Hibler	Story by : Lee Goldberg & William Rabkin and Gerry Conway; Teleplay by : Gerry Conway	February 20, 1997	14.93
78	19	"Delusions of Murder"	Christopher Hibler	Michael Berlin & Eric Estrin	February 27, 1997	14.10
79	20	"A Passion for Murder"	Christian I. Nyby II	Lee Goldberg & William Rabkin	April 3, 1997	12.42
80	21	"Blood Brothers Murder"	Christian I. Nyby II	Barry Van Dyke & Jeffrey Glasser	April 10, 1997	12.24
81	22	"Physician, Murder Thyself"	Christian I. Nyby II	Story by : Gerry Conway and Lee Goldberg & William Rabkin; Teleplay by : Gerry Conway	April 24, 1997	13.33
82	23	"Murder in the Air"	Tom Chehak	Tom Chehak	April 24, 1997	13.09
83	24	"The Merry Widow Murder"	Oz Scott	Joyce Burditt	May 1, 1997	12.20
84	25	"Comedy Is Murder"	Christopher Hibler	Story by : Dick Van Dyke & Lee Goldberg & William Rabkin; Teleplay by : Lee Goldberg & William Rabkin	May 8, 1997	12.62
85	26	"The Murder of Mark Sloan"	Christopher Hibler	Steve Hattman	May 8, 1997	14.16

=== Season 5 (1997–1998) ===
No. overall	No. in season	Title	Directed by	Written by	Original release date	U.S. viewers (millions)
86	1	"Murder Blues"	Christian I. Nyby II	Lee Goldberg & William Rabkin	September 18, 1997	13.96
87	2	"Open and Shut"	Christopher Hibler	Jacquelyn Blain	September 25, 1997	15.11
88	3	"Malibu Fire"	Christian I. Nyby II	Story by : Gerry Conway; Teleplay by : Gerry Conway & Wayne Berwick	October 2, 1997	13.86
89	4	"Deadly Games"	Christopher Hibler	Jeff Peters	October 9, 1997	12.86
90	5	"Slam-Dunk Dead"	Vincent McEveety	Story by : Larry Brody; Teleplay by : Larry Brody and Lee Goldberg & William Rabkin	October 16, 1997	13.86
91	6	"Looks Can Kill"	Christopher Hibler	Craig Tepper	October 23, 1997	15.03
92	7	"Fatal Impact (Part I)"	Christian I. Nyby II	David Bennett Carren & J. Larry Carroll	October 30, 1997	14.93
93	8	"Fatal Impact (Part II)"	Christian I. Nyby II	Jacquelyn Blain	October 30, 1997	14.93
94	9	"Must Kill TV"	Christopher Hibler	Lee Goldberg & William Rabkin	November 6, 1997	15.45
95	10	"Discards"	Christian I. Nyby II	J. Larry Carroll & David Bennett Carren	November 13, 1997	16.07
96	11	"A Mime Is a Terrible Thing to Waste"	Christopher Hibler	Lee Goldberg & William Rabkin	November 20, 1997	15.05
97	12	"Down and Dirty Dead"	Ron Satlof	Barry Van Dyke	December 11, 1997	14.87
98	13	"Retribution: Part 1"	Christian I. Nyby II	Lee Goldberg & William Rabkin	January 8, 1998	13.89
99	14	"Retribution: Part 2"	Christian I. Nyby II	Lee Goldberg & William Rabkin	January 15, 1998	15.98
100	15	"Drill for Death"	Ron Satlof	Robin Madden	January 22, 1998	15.58
101	16	"Rain of Terror"	Christian I. Nyby II	Craig Tepper	January 29, 1998	14.42
102	17	"Baby Boom"	Vincent McEveety	Jacquelyn Blain	February 5, 1998	13.20
103	18	"Talked to Death"	Christian I. Nyby II	Joyce Burditt	February 26, 1998	15.25
104	19	"An Education in Murder"	Frank Thackery	Story by : Jacquelyn Blain and D. O'Brien & Paul Rendle; Teleplay by : Jacquelyn Blain	March 5, 1998	14.99
105	20	"Murder at the Finish Line"	Christopher Hibler	J. Larry Carroll & David Bennett Carren	March 26, 1998	13.76
106	21	"First Do No Harm"	Vincent McEveety	Ernest Kinoy	April 16, 1998	14.62
107	22	"Promises to Keep"	Christian I. Nyby II	David Bennett Carren & J. Larry Carroll	April 23, 1998	14.95
108	23	"Food Fight"	Ron Satlof	Jacquelyn Blain	April 30, 1998	13.09
109	24	"Obsession: Part 1"	Christian I. Nyby II	Lee Goldberg & William Rabkin	May 7, 1998	13.43
110	25	"Obsession: Part 2"	Christian I. Nyby II	Lee Goldberg & William Rabkin	May 14, 1998	12.03

=== Season 6 (1998–1999) ===
No. overall	No. in season	Title	Directed by	Written by	Original release date	U.S. viewers (millions)
111	1	"Resurrection"	Christian I. Nyby II	Lee Goldberg & William Rabkin	September 24, 1998	13.15
112	2	"Resurrection"	Christian I. Nyby II	Lee Goldberg & William Rabkin	September 24, 1998	13.15
113	3	"Till Death Do Us Part"	Max Tash	Terence Winter	October 1, 1998	15.42
114	4	"Wrong Number"	Christian I. Nyby II	James L. Novack	October 8, 1998	12.26
115	5	"Blood Will Out"	Christopher Hibler	Robin Bernheim	October 15, 1998	14.34
116	6	"Alienated"	Bruce Seth Green	J. Larry Carroll & David Bennett Carren	October 29, 1998	14.22
117	7	"Write, She Murdered"	Frank Thackery	Jacquelyn Blain	November 5, 1998	13.48
118	8	"Rear Windows '98"	Vincent McEveety	Jacquelyn Blain	November 12, 1998	14.20
119	9	"The Last Resort"	Christian I. Nyby II	Paul Bishop	November 19, 1998	13.08
120	10	"Murder x 4"	Frank Thackery	J. Larry Carroll & David Bennett Carren	December 3, 1998	12.94
121	11	"Dead in the Water"	Neema Barnette	Robin Bernheim	December 17, 1998	12.70
122	12	"Trapped in Paradise"	Bruce Seth Green	Ernie Wallengren	January 7, 1999	15.90
123	13	"Voices Carry"	Christopher Hibler	Lee Goldberg & William Rabkin	January 21, 1999	13.31
124	14	"Murder, My Suite"	Jim Johnston	Story by : Lee Goldberg & William Rabkin; Teleplay by : E.F. Wallengren	January 28, 1999	13.80
125	15	"Murder on the Hour"	Christopher Hibler	J. Larry Carroll & David Bennett Carren	February 4, 1999	12.13
126	16	"Rescue Me"	William Rabkin	Jacquelyn Blain	February 11, 1999	12.00
127	17	"Down Among the Dead Men"	Barry Steinberg	Paul Bishop	February 18, 1999	12.53
128	18	"Never Say Die"	Frank Thackery	Barry Van Dyke	February 25, 1999	12.92
129	19	"Trash TV"	Ron Satlof	Lee Goldberg (part 1); David Bennett Carren & J. Larry Carroll (part 2)	April 29, 1999	9.86
130	20	"Trash TV"	Ron Satlof	Lee Goldberg (part 1); David Bennett Carren & J. Larry Carroll (part 2)	April 29, 1999	9.86
131	21	"Blood Ties"	Bruce Seth Green	Lee Goldberg & William Rabkin	May 6, 1999	10.98
132	22	"Today Is the Last Day of the Rest of My Life"	Ron Satlof	Ernest Kinoy	May 13, 1999	12.05

=== Season 7 (1999–2000) ===
No. overall	No. in season	Title	Directed by	Written by	Original release date	U.S. viewers (millions)
133	1	"The Roast"	Christopher Hibler	Mark Solomon	September 23, 1999	11.70
134	2	"Sleeping Murder"	Ron Satlof	Chris Abbott	September 30, 1999	12.19
135	3	"Bringing Up Barbie"	Ron Satlof	Steve Brown	October 7, 1999	11.99
136	4	"Murder at Midterm"	Christopher Hibler	Melody Fox & Marc Cushman	October 14, 1999	12.24
137	5	"The Flame"	Christian I. Nyby II	Joel Steiger	October 21, 1999	12.71
138	6	"The Killer Within"	Frank Thackery	Terry Curtis Fox	October 28, 1999	13.60
139	7	"Gangland"	Victor Lobl	Terry Curtis Fox	November 4, 1999	13.86
140	8	"Gangland"	Victor Lobl	Terry Curtis Fox	November 4, 1999	13.86
141	9	"The Mouth That Roared"	Terrence O'Hara	Cathryn Michon	November 11, 1999	11.79
142	10	"The Seven Deadly Sins"	Christopher Hibler	Chris Abbott & Steve Brown	November 18, 1999	11.50
143	11	"Santa Claude"	Nancy Malone	Burt Prelutsky & Steve Brown	December 16, 1999	12.01
144	12	"Man Overboard"	Frank Thackery	Michael Lyons	January 6, 2000	13.26
145	13	"Frontier Dad"	Frank Thackery	Story by : Paul Vincent Picerni & Barry Van Dyke; Teleplay by : Barry Van Dyke	January 13, 2000	12.53
146	14	"Too Many Cooks"	Christopher Hibler	Joyce Burditt	January 20, 2000	13.80
147	15	"Jake's Women"	Victor Lobl	Mark Solomon	February 3, 2000	14.35
148	16	"Murder by Remote"	Christopher Hibler	Terry Curtis Fox	February 10, 2000	13.28
149	17	"Teacher's Pet"	Vince McEveety	Joel Steiger	February 17, 2000	13.64
150	18	"The Unluckiest Bachelor in L.A."	Bernie Kowalski	Cathryn Michon	February 24, 2000	13.55
151	19	"A Resting Place"	Farhad Mann	Story by : Charlie Schlatter & Craig Tomashoff; Teleplay by : Burt Prelutsky	April 6, 2000	11.52
152	20	"Murder at BBQ Bob's"	Victor Lobl	Paul Bishop	April 20, 2000	11.47
153	21	"Two Birds With One Sloan"	Nancy Malone	Terry Curtis Fox	April 27, 2000	11.99
154	22	"Swan Song"	Victor Lobl	Joel Steiger	May 4, 2000	11.48
155	23	"Out of the Past"	Victor Lobl	Steve Brown	May 11, 2000	10.80
156	24	"Getting Mad, Getting Even"	Donald L. Gold	Burt Prelutsky	May 11, 2000	10.80

=== Season 8 (2000–2001) ===
No. overall	No. in season	Title	Directed by	Written by	Original release date	U.S. viewers (millions)
157	1	"Death By Design"	Christopher Hibler	Mark Egan	October 12, 2000	7.93
158	2	"Blind Man's Bluff"	Frank Thackery	Joel Steiger	October 19, 2000	8.43
159	3	"Sleight-of-Hand"	Nancy Malone	Mark Solomon	October 26, 2000	8.40
160	4	"By Reason of Insanity"	Sandy Smolan	Terry Curtis Fox	November 2, 2000	8.39
161	5	"The Patient Detective"	Victor Lobl	Stephen A. Miller	November 9, 2000	7.77
162	6	"The Cradle Will Rock"	Victor Lobl	Joel Steiger	November 16, 2000	8.56
163	7	"Hot House"	Victor Lobl	Terry Curtis Fox	November 30, 2000	8.46
164	8	"All Dressed Up and Nowhere to Die"	Bernie Kowalski	Terry Curtis Fox	December 7, 2000	8.12
165	9	"Confession"	Donald L. Gold	Chris Abbott & Steve Brown	January 4, 2001	9.11
166	10	"Playing God"	Christian I. Nyby II	Burt Prelutsky	January 11, 2001	11.06
167	11	"Less Than Zero"	Christian I. Nyby II	Cathryn Michon	January 18, 2001	10.92
168	12	"Sins of the Father: Part 1"	Victor Lobl	Joel Steiger	February 2, 2001	9.48
169	13	"Sins of the Father: Part 2"	Victor Lobl	Joel Steiger	February 9, 2001	9.82
170	14	"You Bet Your Life"	Nancy Malone	Burt Prelutsky	February 16, 2001	9.50
171	15	"Bachelor Fathers"	James Nasella	Steve Brown	February 23, 2001	9.15
172	16	"Being of Sound Mind"	Christopher Hibler	Burt Prelutsky	March 2, 2001	9.80
173	17	"Dance of Danger"	Christian I. Nyby II	Barry Van Dyke & Jeffrey Glasser	March 30, 2001	8.56
174	18	"The Red Shoes"	Frank Thackery	Victoria Rowell & Fred Fontana	April 20, 2001	8.11
175	19	"No Good Deed"	Sandy Smolan	Terry Curtis Fox	April 27, 2001	9.57
176	20	"Deja Vous"	Christian I. Nyby II	Terry Curtis Fox	May 4, 2001	8.89
177	21	"On the Beach"	Donald L. Gold	Joyce Burditt & Burt Prelutsky	May 4, 2001	9.60
178	22	"The Blair Nurse Project"	Barry Van Dyke	Carey Van Dyke & Barry Van Dyke	May 11, 2001	6.63

=== Movies (2002) ===
Film no.	Title	Directed by	Written by	Original release date	U.S. viewers (millions)
4	"Town Without Pity"	Christopher Hibler	Joel Steiger	February 6, 2002	12.53
5	"Without Warning"	Christian I. Nyby II	Story by : Burt Prelutsky & Steve Brown; Teleplay by : Burt Prelutsky	April 26, 2002	9.59
