= Catfish Christmas =

2022 film directed by Victoria Rowell

- Directed by: Victoria Rowell
- Written by: Dara Frazier
- Produced by: Dara Frazier; Frank Merle; Victoria Rowell; Clelia El Adl Clemens; Todd Clemens; George Hartman
- Starring: Tony Todd; Ella Joyce; Leigh-Ann Rose; Anthony B. Riggins Jr; Devin Laster; Andrae Todd James Bicy; Charlotte Evelyn Williams
- Cinematography: Danilo Rodriguez
- Edited by: Gary Lee Cohen
- Music by: Talip Peshkepia; DeAna Fai
- Production company: Lone Morsel Productions
- Distributed by: Vision Films
- Release date: December 1, 2022
- Country: United States
- Language: English

Catfish Christmas is an American romantic holiday drama film directed by Victoria Rowell. The film stars Tony Todd,Ella Joyce, Leigh-Ann Rose, Devin Laster, Anthony B. Riggins Jr., Andrae Todd James Bicy, and Charlotte Evelyn Williams.

== Plot ==
Online Dating becomes a disaster when a woman learns that the handsome football player she's interested in, may not be what she's looking for.

== Cast ==
- Tony Todd as Bob
- Ella Joyce as Helen
- Leigh-Ann Rose as Leslie
- Devin Laster as Devin Miller
- Anthony B. Riggins Jr. as Mike Avery
- Andrae Todd James Bicy as Gary
- Charlotte Evelyn Williams as Faith

== Music ==
Talip Peshkepia is the composer for the film. "Christmas Love" by Pop/RnB/Soul Artist DeAna Fai debuted as the theme song as well as others to include "Two Worlds," "Challenge," and "Me and Mine."

== Release ==
The film was released on December 1, 2022 by Vision Films.

== See also ==
- List of Christmas films
