= Talip =

Talip is a given name. Notable people with the given name include:

- Talip Küçükcan (born 1963), Turkish diplomat
- Talip Peshkepia (born 1986), American film composer and songwriter
