= Radcliffe Bailey =

American artist (1968–2023)

- Born: November 25, 1968; Bridgeton, New Jersey, U.S.
- Died: November 14, 2023 (aged 54); Atlanta, Georgia, U.S.
- Education: Atlanta College of Art
- Known for: Painting, sculpture, mixed media
- Spouses: Victoria Rowell (m. 2009; div. 2014): Leslie Campbell Parks
- Children: 2
- Awards: • 2008 Joan Mitchell Foundation Grant • 2010 Mallory Factory Prize for Southern Art

Radcliffe Bailey (November 25, 1968 – November 14, 2023) was an American contemporary visual artist noted for mixed-media, paint, and sculpture works that explore Black American history. He was based in Atlanta, Georgia.

== Early life and education ==
Radcliffe Bailey was born in Bridgeton, New Jersey on November 25, 1968. His mother was a school teacher. His grandfather was a Baptist deacon and built a church near Charlotteville, South Carolina. Other members of his family were following Marcus Garvey. Family on his father´s side had migrated and stopped in NJ on their way to Canada, as they were working on the railroad. They lived with the extended family all in the same rural area, his grandfather raising asparagus. At age four, in 1972 his family decided to move to Atlanta, Georgia to have their children grow up in a different area. His interest in art was galvanised by childhood visits to the High Museum of Art and drawing classes he later took at the Atlanta College of Art. He met Jacob Lawrence at an exhibition while in Middle School. He cited Atlanta's history with civil rights and the Civil War as artistic inspirations, as well as historical figures, such as George Washington Carver and Charleston-based blacksmith Philip Simmons.

Bailey attended the Atlanta College of Art and received a Bachelor of Fine Arts in 1991. He was trained as a sculptor but experimented with paint and mixed media.

== Career ==
Untitled (2009) by Radcliffe Bailey at the National Gallery of Art's showing of Afro-Atlantic Histories in Washington, D.C., in 2022

From 2001 to 2006, he taught at the Lamar Dodd School of Art at the University of Georgia. In 2006, he did a DNA test and learned that he had heritage from Mende people and Sierra Leone. He worked within the convergence of painting and sculpture, utilizing items such as vintage photographs of his family, vinyl records, piano keys, and bottlecaps. Thematically, his art explores the intersection of ancestry, race, and cultural memory. In 2003, he adopted a style of art conceptually inspired by Kongo minkisi, which he described as being "medicine cabinet sculptures." As a result, his work has been described as being three-dimensional and layered, incorporating elements of smell and sound. In a 2013 interview, Bailey described his creative process and fascination with the connection between past and present, stating: "The day by day experience of art, even though my work may seem to have this layer of history, it is also a cover for what I’m dealing with on a day to day. It’s very much about today. We were talking about where I go next: I’m still thinking about today and yesterday and what’s coming in front of me tomorrow." His large-scale installation Windward Coast (2009–2011), was presented as part of the First International Biennial of Contemporary Art of Cartagena de Indias in Colombia. In 2023, Bailey's work was included in the collective exhibition Spirit in the Land organized by the Nasher Museum of Art at Duke University and later exhibited at the Pérez Art Museum Miami in 2024. The show talks about the natural environments of the United States and that of the Caribbean in relation social and cultural aspects.

In 2020 he discussed the story behind many of his works which deal with migration like Distant Stars II (1998), Tricky, (2006), which shows a ship and a hat, Storm at Sea (2007) with a sea of piano keys as well as in West Coast Slave Trade (2009-18), Door of No Return (2015 w ith a photo of the sea in Cuba, which were shown at Sheldon Museum of Art at the University of Nebraska, Lincoln. His work Caravan (2018) shows a vintage photo of his family a ship and a railroad track in reference to his ancestors and Stars Over the Argonne Forest (2019) a military blanket.

== Awards ==
He was recognized for his artistic contributions, receiving the Joan Mitchell Foundation Grant in 2008 and the Elizabeth and Mallory Factory Prize for Southern Art in 2010.

== Later life and death ==
On June 27, 2009, Bailey married American actress, dancer, and producer Victoria Rowell. The wedding was announced in The New York Times. The couple divorced in 2014. Bailey later married Leslie Campbell Parks, daughter of photographer Gordon Parks. Bailey had two children, a son and a daughter.

Radcliffe Bailey died on November 14, 2023, in Atlanta, Georgia, after battling brain cancer. He was 54.

== Solo exhibitions ==
Bailey held solo exhibitions of his work at many galleries and institutions including:

- The Mint Museum of Art, Charlotte, North Carolina, ARTCurrents II: Radcliffe Bailey (1992)
- TULA Foundation Gallery, Atlanta, Georgia, Radcliffe Bailey: Places of Rebirth (1992)
- Atlanta College of Art, Atlanta, Georgia, Spiritual Migration (2001)
- Harvey B. Gantt Center for African American Arts & Culture, Charlotte, North Carolina, Between Two Worlds: The Art of Radcliffe Bailey (2009)
- High Museum of Art, Atlanta, Georgia: Art of an Ancient Soul (2010), Radcliffe Bailey: Memory as Medicine (2011)
- Bridget Mayer Gallery, Philadelphia, Pennsylvania, Notes (2015)
- Contemporary Arts Center, New Orleans, Louisiana, US Radcliffe Bailey: Recent Works (2015)
- SCAD Museum of Art Savannah, Georgia, Pensive (2018)

== Collections ==
Bailey's work is held in many permanent collections including:

- The Metropolitan Museum of Art, New York, NY.
- The Smithsonian Museum of American Art, Washington, D.C.
- The National Gallery of Art, Washington, D.C.
- The Art Institute of Chicago, Illinois
- The Museum of Fine Arts, Houston, Texas
- The Nelson-Atkins Museum of Art, Kansas City, Missouri
- The Denver Art Museum, Colorado
- The High Museum of Art, Atlanta, Georgia
- Nasher Museum of Art at Duke University, Durham, North Carolina
