= Diagnosis: Murder =

American crime drama TV series (1993–2001)

- Title screen used in seasons 1 and 2
- Genre: Crime; Drama; Mystery; Medical drama
- Created by: Joyce Burditt
- Starring: Dick Van Dyke; Scott Baio; Victoria Rowell; Barry Van Dyke; Michael Tucci; Delores Hall; Charlie Schlatter
- Theme music composer: Richard "Dick" DeBenedictis; Joel Goldsmith (Season 6)
- Country of origin: United States
- Original language: English
- No. of seasons: 8
- No. of episodes: 178 (+ pilot and 5 TV movies) (list of episodes)

Production
- Executive producers: Fred Silverman; Dean Hargrove; Dick Van Dyke; Lee Goldberg; Chris Abbott; William Rabkin; Michael Gleason; Tom Chehak; Gerald Sanoff; Joel Steiger
- Production locations: Denver; Los Angeles
- Running time: 45 minutes
- Production companies: Dean Hargrove Productions; The Fred Silverman Company; Viacom Productions

Original release
- Network: CBS
- Release: October 29, 1993 – May 11, 2001

Related
- Jake and the Fatman

Diagnosis: Murder is an American mystery medical crime drama television series starring Dick Van Dyke as Dr. Mark Sloan, a medical doctor who solves crimes with the help of his son Steve, a homicide detective played by Van Dyke's real-life son Barry. The series began as a spin-off of Jake and the Fatman (Sloan made his first appearance in the 1991 episode "It Never Entered My Mind"), became a series of three television films, and then a weekly television series that premiered on CBS on October 29, 1993. Joyce Burditt, who created the show, wrote the Jake and the Fatman episode.

The series struggled at first and was almost canceled at the end of the second season, but it returned as a mid-season replacement in the third season and was regularly renewed thereafter. During the show's eight seasons, 178 episodes were produced and aired on the CBS network in the United States, and two more TV movies aired after the series' final episode aired on May 11, 2001. The show is currently distributed by CBS Television Distribution.

In the Jake and the Fatman episode, Dr. Mark Sloan was a widower with no sons. Dr. Amanda Bentley is played by Cynthia Gibb in the TV movies, and by Victoria Rowell in the TV series. Stephen Caffrey played Dr. Jack Parker in the movies, a role that went to Scott Baio as Dr. Jack Stewart in the weekly series (first two seasons).

The first two TV movies were shot in Vancouver, British Columbia, and the third was shot in Denver, Colorado. The first eight episodes of the series were also shot (and set) in Denver, before quickly (and without explanation) shifting to Los Angeles for the remainder of the show's run. Since 1997, reruns of the show have been shown in syndication and on Freeform (formerly ABC Family and originally CBN Satellite Service), Ion Television (formerly PAX-TV), Hallmark Channel, 10 Bold, CBS Action and MeTV. In the UK, it is currently being shown on Great! TV.

== Plot ==
The plot centered around Dr. Mark Sloan (Dick Van Dyke), a former United States Army doctor who served in a MASH unit. After his service ended, Dr. Sloan became a renowned physician and began consulting with the local police, and found himself unable to resist a good mystery or a friend in need. Cases often involved his son, Detective Steve Sloan (Barry Van Dyke), and Norman Briggs (Michael Tucci in seasons 1–4), a hospital administrator and a close friend of his. Also assisting Dr. Sloan are his colleagues, medical examiner/pathology Dr. Amanda Bentley (Victoria Rowell) and Dr. Jack Stewart (Scott Baio in the first two seasons), who is later replaced by a new resident, Dr. Jesse Travis (Charlie Schlatter from season 3 onward).

== Episodes ==
Diagnosis: Murder had a total of eight seasons and 178 episodes which were broadcast on CBS between 1993 and 2001.

Season	Episodes	Originally released	
Season	Episodes	First released	Last released
Pilot		March 20, 1991	
Movies 1–2		January 5, 1992	February 13, 1992
Movie 3		February 13, 1993	
1	19	October 29, 1993	May 13, 1994
2	22	September 16, 1994	May 5, 1995
3	18	December 8, 1995	May 3, 1996
4	26	September 19, 1996	May 8, 1997
5	25	September 18, 1997	May 14, 1998
6	22	September 24, 1998	May 13, 1999
7	24	September 23, 1999	May 11, 2000
8	22	October 12, 2000	May 11, 2001
Movies 4–5		February 6, 2002	April 26, 2002

== Cast ==
=== Main ===
Character	Played by	Occupation	Seasons									
Character	Played by	Occupation	Movies (1992–93)	1	2	3	4	5	6	7	8	Movies (2002)
Mark Sloan	Dick Van Dyke	Doctor	Main	Main	Main	Main	Main	Main	Main	Main	Main	Main
Amanda Bentley	Cynthia Gibb	Doctor	Main									
Amanda Bentley	Victoria Rowell	Doctor		Main	Main	Main	Main	Main	Main	Main	Main	Main
Jack Parker	Stephen Caffrey	Doctor	Main									
Steve Sloan	Barry Van Dyke	Police detective/lieutenant	Main	Main	Main	Main	Main	Main	Main	Main	Main	Main
Jack Stewart	Scott Baio	Doctor		Main	Main							
Norman Briggs	Michael Tucci	Administrator		Main	Main	Main	Main					
Delores Mitchell	Delores Hall	Secretary		Main	Main							
Jesse Travis	Charlie Schlatter	Doctor				Main	Main	Main	Main	Main	Main	Main

The cast, 1993–1995: Victoria Rowell, Michael Tucci, Barry Van Dyke, Scott Baio, and Delores Hall, with Dick Van Dyke in the center

- Dr. Mark Sloan (played by Dick Van Dyke), Former army doctor and Chief of Internal Medicine at Community General Hospital, and protagonist of the series. Son of a police officer and father of another, in whose cases he often gets involved. He is a medical consultant to the LAPD. Dick Van Dyke was considered for the lead role after the positive reviews he received from his dramatic role in the 1990 movie Dick Tracy (although the character he played in the movie was a villain and very different from the role of Mark Sloan). In the pilot, the character had interests in tap dance and clarinet playing; however, these were considered distracting and were toned down and eventually removed from the character as the series developed.
- Lieutenant Detective Steve Sloan (played by Barry Van Dyke), a detective sergeant (later lieutenant from season 2 onward) in the Robbery/Homicide Division of the LAPD and Dr. Mark Sloan's son. After an earthquake destroyed his apartment, he lived in a separate apartment in his father's beach house in Malibu, California. Steve often uses his "patented" dive to apprehend criminals.
- Dr. Amanda Bentley (played by Cynthia Gibb in the TV movies set before the series), later Bentley-Livingston (played there by Victoria Rowell), resident Pathology at Community General Hospital and assistant County Medical Examiner, who is also Dr. Mark Sloan's double act and medical partner, involving in each of Mark's & Steve's cases, after the accident. As a favorable character of the show, she also dated Jack and was later Jesse's best friend. During the series, she married a military man named Colin Livingston, and they had one son named C.J. She named her only biological child Colin Jesse Livingston after his father and Dr. Jesse Travis, who delivered the baby alone in the back of his beloved VW convertible, with Mark assisting over cell phone. Her husband was overseas at the time and unfortunately unreachable. Depending on the episode, she later divorced her husband or he was killed in an airplane crash. Later in the series, she adopted another boy, Deon.
- Dr. Jack Stewart (played by Scott Baio in the series from 1993 to 1995, seasons 1–2), a doctor at Community General Hospital and Steve's best friend, who he often helped in his cases. He left to open his own family medicine practice in Colorado. Jack Stewart does reappear in a couple of Lee Goldberg's Diagnosis Murder books, The Silent Partner and The Last Word. In the first three TV Movies, a similar character named Jack Parker, played by Stephen Caffrey, filled Stewart's position.
- Dr. Jesse Travis (played by Charlie Schlatter, 1995–2001, seasons 3–8), a residency and handsome student at Community General Hospital who Mark took under his wing and who became best friends with Amanda. He later went into business with Steve as partners in a barbecue restaurant. Another favorable/list of breakout characters of the series, he often got involved in Mark and Steve's cases, with good intentions but not always good results. In the crossover double episode "Murder Two", he himself became the prime suspect of a rival doctor's killing, hence he badgered Mark to call his old friend Ben Matlock (played by Dick's real-life best friend Andy Griffith) for help. The hospital staff thought he wrote the tell-all book "Big City Hospital" as Dr. Anonymous but later found out it was written by someone else. Jason Tucker was a character in the book who sounded exactly like Jesse, which is why the hospital staff thought it was him.
- Norman Briggs (played by Michael Tucci, 1993–1997, seasons 1–4), business administration at Community General Hospital and a close friend of Dr. Mark Sloan, even though he is often exasperated by him.
- Delores Mitchell (played by Delores Hall, 1993–1995, seasons 1–2), Dr. Sloan's lively secretary.

=== Notable guest stars ===
One unique aspect of the series was that it frequently appropriated characters from various classic television series, or featured veteran actors playing characters inspired by or similar to their classic roles.

- Rob Petrie (played by Van Dyke himself in The Dick Van Dyke Show) features in a cameo in the episode "Obsession, Part 2" where Dr. Sloan is in a radio station, and walks past a studio where (through use of CGI), Rob is trying his hand at radio Disc jockey. The footage of Rob as a DJ is taken from the Dick Van Dyke Show episode "One Hundred Terrible Hours". This scene moves Diagnosis: Murder into the realm of fantasy as Petrie is shown in black and white (with Sloan visible in a color insert behind him), after which Sloan breaks the fourth wall and looks at the audience before the story continues.
- Mike Connors reprised his titular character of Mannix in the season 4 episode "Hard-Boiled Murder." The episode's story was a sequel to the Mannix episode "Little Girl Lost."
- Andy Griffith reprised his titular role of Ben Matlock from Dean Hargrove's Matlock series in Season 4 two-parter "Murder Two" (1997). In a sense, this brought Diagnosis: Murder full circle, as its parent series, Jake and the Fatman, was inspired by a Season 1 episode of Matlock in 1986.
- Barbara Bain reprised her role of Cinnamon Carter of Mission: Impossible in season 5 episode "Discards."
- Peter Graves, who starred alongside Barbara Bain on Mission: Impossible as Jim Phelps did not return as his character, but did make a very brief cameo in "Must Kill TV" and the same scene is seen in part 1 of the Series 6 episode Trash TV Part 1 as "Dr. Sloane" [sic] in a Mission: Impossible-style illusion of his first TV pilot of "Doctor Danger," later replaced during the show.
- Robert Culp also guest starred in the episode "Discards" as Dane Travis, a retired espionage, tennis professional, and Dr. Travis' father. The character was similar to his Kelly Robinson character from I Spy, though Travis was said to have worked with the Impossible Missions Force (also seen on Mission: Impossible).
- "Discards" also featured appearances by former TV spies Patrick Macnee (The Avengers), Robert Vaughn (The Man from U.N.C.L.E.) and Phil Morris (the 1988 version of Mission: Impossible), though they did not play their original characters.
- Jack Klugman also guest starred in season 4 episode "Physician, Murder Thyself," as a character very similar to his famous role on Quincy, M.E.. He guest-starred again, in season 6 episode "Voices Carry" as police detective Harry Trumble, the former fiance of Dr. Mark Sloan's late wife. Trumble reappeared in Lee Goldberg's Diagnosis Murder novel "The Past Tense."
- George Takei, Walter Koenig, Majel Barrett, Wil Wheaton, and Grace Lee Whitney (all from Star Trek or Star Trek: The Next Generation), as well as Bill Mumy (from Lost in Space), were guest stars in "Alienated!" one sixth season episode, which involved an apparent extraterrestrial life alien abduction and coverup.
- The episode "Drill for Death" included appearances by several actors associated with the M*A*S*H franchise: Elliott Gould and Sally Kellerman from the original movie; Jamie Farr, Loretta Swit and William Christopher from the television series; and Christopher Norris from the sequel series Trapper John, M.D..
- Randolph Mantooth and Robert Fuller, who worked together on NBC's Emergency! appeared together in a 1997 episode about the Malibu, California brushfires.
- The episode "Must Kill TV" features a number of small cameos by television personalities such as Erik Estrada and Dr. Joyce Brothers playing themselves and a larger one from Stephen J. Cannell as an over-the-top producer of action TV. The role is reprised in the two-parter "Trash TV."
- The episode "Food Fight" (1998) features Erin Moran, Pat Morita, Don Most, David Lander, Leslie Easterbrook and Conrad Janis. All of these actors starred alongside Scott Baio in Happy Days or its spin-offs, Laverne & Shirley, Joanie Loves Chachi and Mork & Mindy.
- The episode "Promises to Keep" (1998) features characters introduced in the Promised Land (a spin-off of Touched by an Angel) episode "Total Security" (1998) crossover into the show.
- A somewhat special case is the appearance of Jennifer Ringley (the internet's first web-based lifecaster with her pioneering JenniCam website from 1996 to 2003) in the 1998's episode "Rear Windows '98", where she played a fictionalized version of herself (with a website called "Joannecam") who is killed in the first minute.
- Regis Philbin and Kathie Lee Gifford skewered their image as friendly daytime TV talk show hosts on the 1998 episode, "Talked to Death."
- In "Death in the Daytime", Lauralee Bell, Eric Braeden, Jeanne Cooper, Doug Davidson, Kristoff St. John, Melody Thomas Scott, and Heather Tom make guest appearances from The Young and the Restless.

Over the run of the show, various episodes guest starred at least eight different members of the Van Dyke family:

- Dick Van Dyke and son Barry Van Dyke in the lead roles.
- Dick's brother, Jerry Van Dyke.
- One of Dick's daughters, Stacy Van Dyke.
- Barry's children: Carey Van Dyke, Shane Van Dyke, Wes Van Dyke and Taryn Van Dyke.

=== Smaller recurring roles ===
- Joanna Cassidy (Season 7) plays Madison Wesley, a doctor friend of Mark Sloan, and Dean of Community General's Medical School. She is in 8 episodes.
- Kim Little (Seasons 5 and 6) plays Susan Hillard, Jesse's longtime girlfriend, for 10 episodes. In the season 7 episode "Bringing Up Barbie" It is mentioned that she left Jesse to go to Oregon with a male Chiropractor. But in the Diagnosis Murder books which take place after Season 6, she appears in almost every book and Jesse and Susan get married in the book "The Dead Letter".
- Susan Gibney (Seasons 5–7) plays Detective Tanis Archer, Steve's partner in 4 episodes. Susan Gibney was also in three other episodes as two different characters.
- Charmin Lee (Seasons 7–8) is Steve's second partner Detective Cheryl Brooks, who is in 11 episodes between seasons 7 and 8.
- Martin Kove (Seasons 6–7) is Captain Newman, for 3 episodes.
- Shane Van Dyke (Seasons 4–8) is Alex Smith, a third year medical school, who appears in 14 episodes during seasons 7 and 8. He is also seen as a boxing student in Never Say Die and an actor in Frontier Dad. (Both these episodes star the rest of Barry Van Dyke's children also.)
- Carey Van Dyke (Seasons 4–8) plays various characters: Mr. Kelso, Terry Marshall, Kyle Lewis, Brendan Kelly, Carl Simpson, and Craig Wilson. In the TV movie "A Town without Pity" he plays a character named "Billy".
- Kevin McNally II (Seasons 3–8) as the ubiquitous Emergency Medical Technician in 19 episodes.
- Tim Conway plays Tim Conrad, an old friend of Mark's and a comedian, in 2 episodes. Conway and Van Dyke had previously worked together on The Carol Burnett Show.
- Harry Lennix (Seasons 5–6) plays FBI Agent Ron Wagner and Amanda's love interest in 6 episodes.
- Fred Dryer (Season 5) plays Police Chief Masters in 3 episodes.
- Nancy Youngblut (seasons 4–5) plays Nurse Nancy Rush in 2 episodes.
- Mariette Hartley (1st and 2nd TV movies only) plays Kate Hamilton the Administrator at Community General Hospital.
- Vernee Watson-Johnson (1st and 2nd TV movies only) plays Esther Wiggins Dr. Mark Sloan's secretary.
- Kimberly Quinn (episode "Dance of Danger" and the TV movie "Without Warning") plays Ellen Sharp, a tabloid news reporter in whom Steve Sloan is interested. Steve proposes to her in the TV movie "Without Warning" and she says yes.
- Robert Bailey Jr. (Season 7) plays Colin Jesse, or C.J. for short, Amanda Bentley's son. He was born in season three of the show and is played by Robert Bailey Jr. in three of the episodes he appeared in. C.J. appeared in a few more episodes before Season 7 as a different child actor.
- Aaron Meeks (Season 7) plays Deon a boy who Dr. Amanda Bentley adopts. He appears in 3 episodes.

== Locations and administrators ==
=== Denver, Colorado location ===
The first season's filming commenced in July 1993 in Denver, Colorado. Much of the cast as well as the production company personnel from Viacom stayed in the (then) Embassy Suites Hotel in downtown, located at 19th Street between Curtis and Arapahoe. Among the reasons that production of Diagnosis: Murder was located in Denver was because the same production people had already been working there since around 1990, filming the new Perry Mason made-for-TV movies.

At that same time, Raymond Burr and his associates were busily filming their episodes for Perry Mason. In and around the Embassy Suites Hotel at that time, it was not unusual to see several semi-trailers parked street-side in support of the production at various office or exterior locations in and around downtown Denver.

Both series were produced by the Hargrove/Silverman team with Viacom. Therefore, the business decision to combine both productions at the same location was evident. While the Perry Mason series was often filmed in a special courtroom constructed for the production within The Denver City and County Building, Diagnosis: Murder was temporarily set at the then-recently-closed St. Luke’s Hospital on 19th Street just east of downtown.

When Raymond Burr became terminally ill later that summer, he no longer was seen at the hotel after having filmed his last TV movie, The Case of the Killer Kiss (1993). In fact, upon his demise, Paul Sorvino was seen entering the hotel building to begin filming what was to be the last Perry Mason movie ever produced in Denver, A Perry Mason Mystery: The Case of the Wicked Wives (1993). Upon completion of that filming, Viacom and the entire production company left Denver in late September/early October 1993, including that of Diagnosis: Murder. Thus, only the Diagnosis: Murder episodes filmed from mid-July through September 1993 were shot in Denver, after which production shifted permanently to Los Angeles.

=== Community General Hospital ===
Community General Hospital is the main set for the show. It is six to seven floors depending on the episode. It holds about 400 beds, with three trauma rooms, two psych wards, and one Intensive Care Unit. Dr. Mark Sloan is Chief of Internal Medicine. The Marriott Hotels & Resorts in Woodland Hills, Los Angeles, was used as the exterior of Community General Hospital in the final three seasons of the show.

List of Administrators at Community General Hospital

1. Russell Havilland (was The Administrator at Clairemont Hospital in the Pilot of Diagnosis: Murder, "It Never Entered My Mind". He was murdered and Dr. Mark Sloan was framed for his murder.)
2. Kate Hamilton (was The Administrator at Community General Hospital in The 1st and 2nd Diagnosis: Murder TV Movies. It was said in the Diagnosis: Murder book "The Shooting Script" that Kate Hamilton decided to sell her home and use the proceeds to open a nonprofit food bank in the inner city.)
3. Norman Briggs (was The Administrator of Community General Hospital for the first 4 seasons of Diagnosis: Murder. According to the book "The Shooting Script" it sounds like Norman was fired by the new owners Healthcorp International.)
4. Harold Lomax (he appeared in a few episodes like "Do No Harm" and "Today is The Last Day of the Rest of My Life". In the book "The Shooting Script" When Community General Hospital was sold to Healthcorp International they brought in General Harold Lomax who'd spent ten years running battlefield medical operations for the U.S. Marine Corps. Harold Lomax later resigned with an Extreme case of Irritable Bowel syndrome and left behind a hospital literally in ruins, decimated by a serial bomber "Catlin Sweeney" who was stalking Mark for putting her brother "Carter Sweeney" in prison.)
5. Noah Dent (he appeared in the books "The Shooting Script" and "The Last Word". He ended up being hired by the new owners of the hospital "Hollywood International" and had a personal vendetta against Mark Sloan for Catching "Tanya" who murdered a rapist who raped her and killed a homeless War Veteran who saw her kill him. He ended up firing Mark, Amanda, and Jesse's girlfriend Susan. Jesse ended up finding out and blackmailed him into giving everyone back their jobs. He ended up leaving Community General Hospital.)
6. Janet Dorcott (she appeared in the book "The Last Word". She ended up firing Jesse and Susan Travis, after being framed for murder and Amanda Bentley was also fired for selling body parts from dead bodies and fired Mark because she blamed him for all the scandal around Community General Hospital.)

=== BBQ Bob's ===
BBQ Bob's is a restaurant that Jesse Travis and Steve Sloan co-own starting in the sixth season. Mark Sloan is also a silent partner. It is located in a small strip mall very close to Community General Hospital. Other stores around it include a jewelry store, travel agency and a bank. It is often frequented by the hospital staff as an alternative to the hospital cafeteria. All staff members get discounts. The exterior of BBQ Bob's was based on a storefront at the Whizin's Center in Agoura, California, where exterior scenes of BBQ Bob's were occasionally filmed.

=== Mark's house ===
In the first two seasons of the show Mark Sloan lived in a house in Denver, Colorado. No explanation is given when the show shifts to California for all the remaining episodes.

=== The Sloans' beach house ===
Starting in the third season, Mark and Steve Sloan live in a beach house at 3231 Beach Drive, Malibu, with Steve in the basement. The basement was often redressed to act as other sets. The actual house is on Broad Beach Road in Malibu, California. The house was later used as a filming location for the Disney Channel show Hannah Montana.

== Pilot and TV movies ==
=== Pilot ===
The pilot episode, "It Never Entered My Mind", is an episode of Jake and the Fatman. In that episode, Mark Sloan is a widower with no sons. The hospital is called Clairemont Hospital instead of Community General Hospital, and there is no Jack or Amanda. His friends who helped him clear his name are Richard (Steven Eckholdt), Josie (Ally Walker) and Thad (Kristoff St. John).

=== TV movies ===
Diagnosis: Murder had five TV movies between 1992 and 2002, three of which aired prior to the TV series.

- Diagnosis of Murder, the first TV movie was filmed in July 1991 and aired before the regular series, January 5, 1992, on CBS.
- The House on Sycamore Street, the second TV movie, aired before the regular series, May 1, 1992, on CBS.
- A Twist of the Knife, the third TV movie, aired before the regular series, February 13, 1993, on CBS.
- A Town Without Pity, the fourth TV movie, aired after the end of the regular series, February 6, 2002, on CBS.
- Without Warning, the fifth and final TV movie, aired after the end of the regular series, April 26, 2002, on CBS.

== Backdoor pilots ==
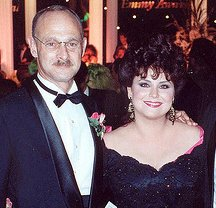
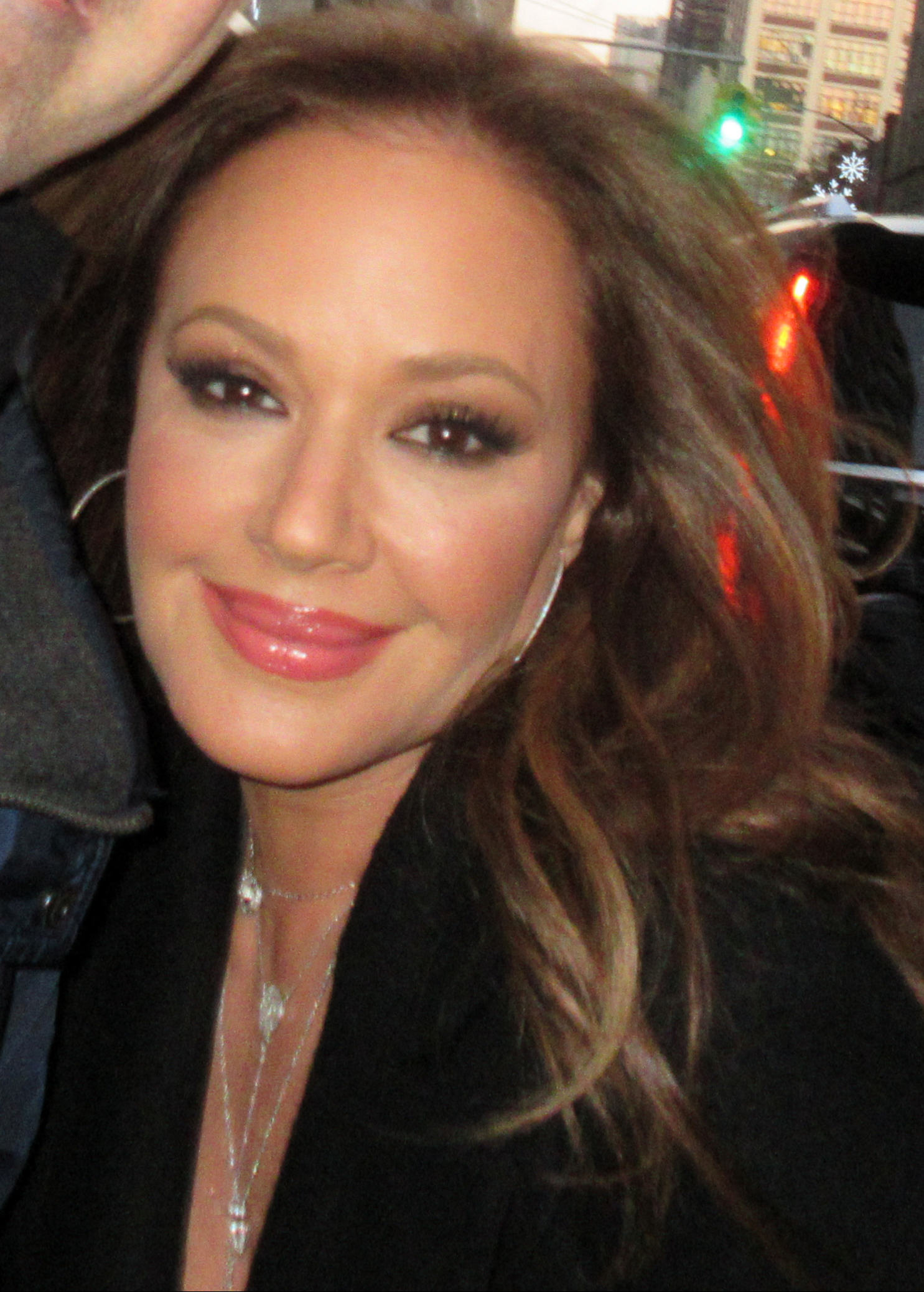
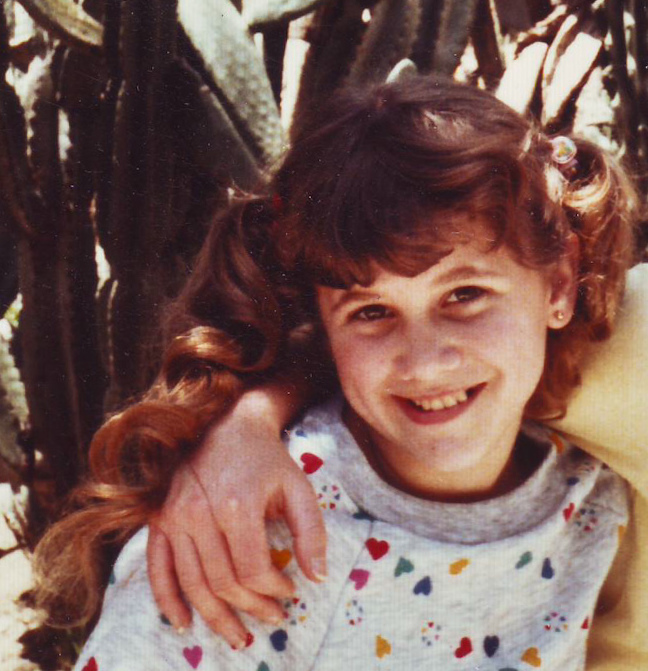
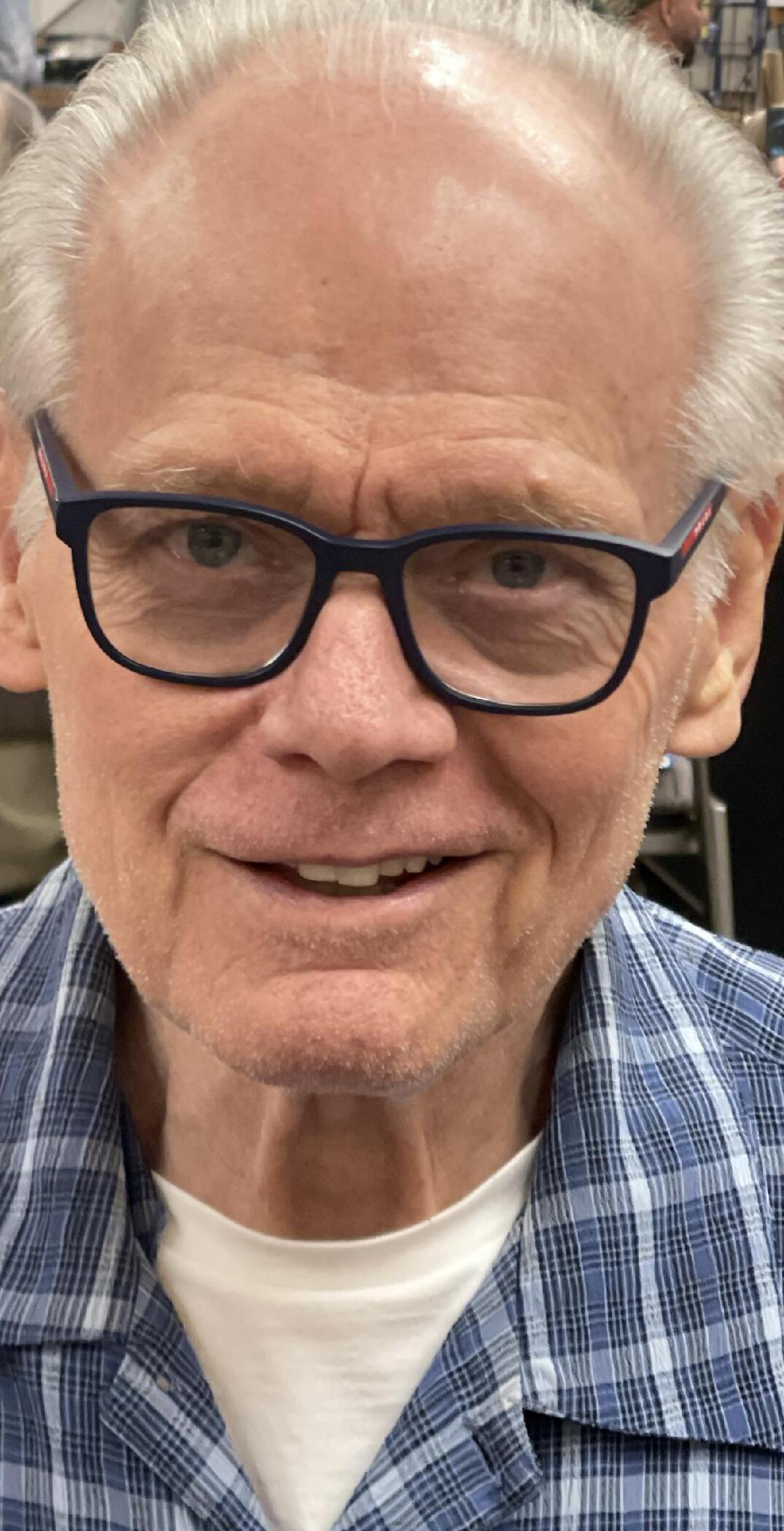
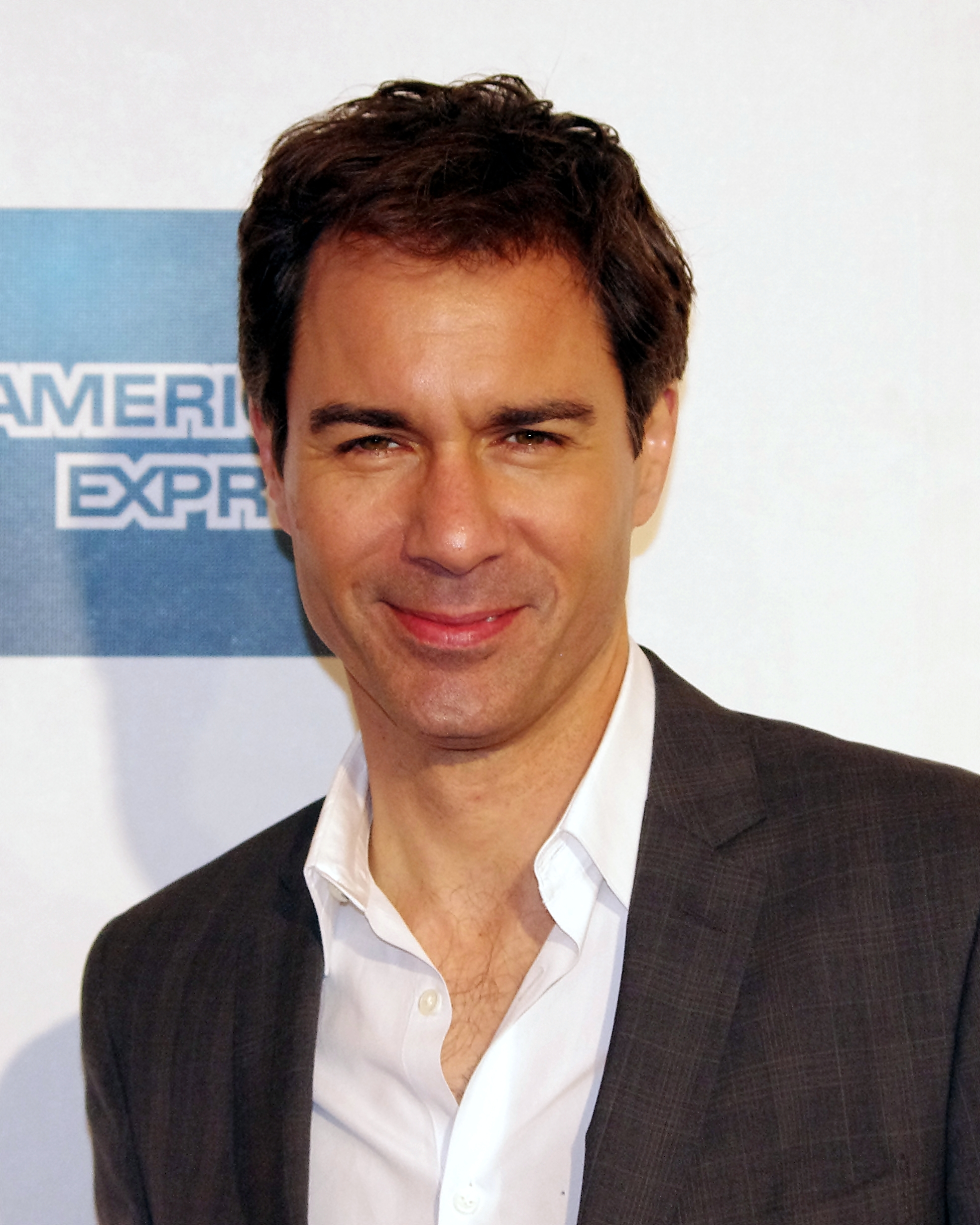
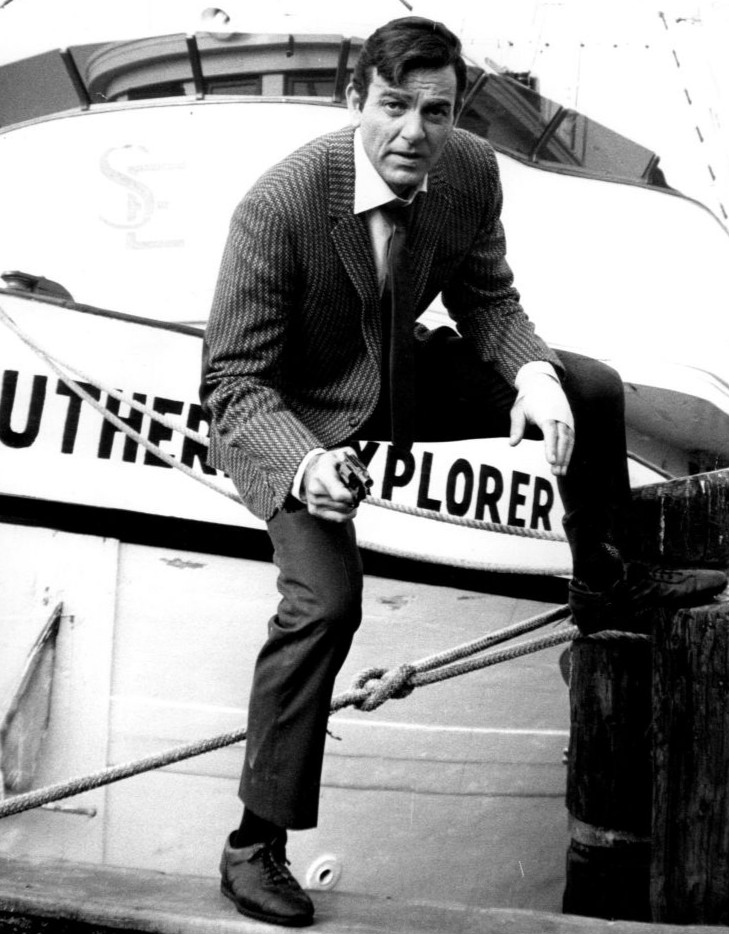
Guest stars in Diagnosis: Murder backdoor pilots: Delta Burke as Sister Michael, Leah Remini as Agnes, Tracey Gold as Amy Dawson, Fred Dryer as Chief Masters, Eric McCormack as militia leader, and Mike Connors as Joe Mannix.

Executive producer Fred Silverman insisted that every season Diagnosis: Murder devote at least one episode to serving as a potential television pilot. These backdoor pilots were used to test new characters and concepts without going through the traditional network development process.

=== Season one ===
1. "Sister Michael Wants You" – Delta Burke appears as Sister Michael, a glamorous former actress turned crime‑solving nun. The proposed spin-off (sometimes referred to as Heavensent) would have followed Sister Michael using her background as a police officer's daughter to assist investigations, with occasional help from Dr. Sloan.

=== Season two ===
1. "Georgia on My Mind" – A backdoor pilot about a secretary-turned-amateur private investigator, Georgia (Daphne Ashbrook), who becomes involved in a murder case while repeatedly insisting she is "just a secretary." The episode uses broad screwball comedy, including a slapstick arrest sequence and a running gag about mishearing "Cherry Matter" ice cream as actor Jerry Mathers.
2. "How to Murder Your Lawyer" – Mitchell Whitfield and Leah Remini star as lawyer Arnold Baskin and paralegal Agnes Benedetto, respectively, in a legal‑procedural‑style backdoor pilot built around their crime‑solving partnership. Network executives ultimately felt the on‑screen chemistry between the leads was not strong enough to support a separate series.

=== Season four ===
1. "An Explosive Murder" – Stars Tracey Gold as undercover police officer Amy Dawson, infiltrating a domestic terrorist group known as the Scorpions, led by a character played by Eric McCormack. The episode was effectively run as a stand‑alone pilot week by former Matlock producers Dean Hargrove and Joel Steiger, but no spin-off was ordered.
2. "Hard-Boiled Murder" – A reunion/backdoor pilot for a possible revival of the CBS detective series Mannix, with Mike Connors reprising his role as private investigator Joe Mannix. The story revisits an unsolved case from the original series, with Mannix now treated by Dr. Sloan. The episode achieved strong ratings and prompted meetings about a new Mannix series, but concerns about Connors' age and the show's older demographic led CBS and UPN to pass.

=== Season five ===
1. "Murder Blues" – A stunt‑cast episode that reunited several actors known for playing television police officers, including Fred Dryer as Los Angeles Police Chief Masters. Dryer's performance led producers to develop a more explicit backdoor pilot around the character later in the season.
2. "A Mime Is a Terrible Thing to Waste" – An unsold backdoor pilot for an untitled series built around Randy Wolfe (Rachel York), a polymath who would take on a different job each week and inevitably become involved in a murder investigation. The premise grew out of Silverman's enthusiasm for York, then a Broadway star, and his desire to build a vehicle around her. The episode, set on Venice Beach, is noted for its extensive physical comedy and an "elephant" mime routine for Dick Van Dyke, but CBS declined to pursue the spin-off.
3. "Retribution" (Parts One and Two) – A two‑part episode that doubled as a backdoor pilot for a proposed series titled The Chief, centered on Police Chief Masters (Fred Dryer) and his off‑the‑books special investigations unit, including characters played by Neal McDonough and Susan Gibney. The story was structured so that the Diagnosis: Murder regulars could be edited out to create a stand‑alone pilot film. Audience response and ratings were strong, but network executives declined to proceed, in part due to Dryer's strained relationships with several networks following Hunter.

=== Season six ===
1. "Blood Ties" – Features vice unit detectives Amy Devlin (Kathy Evison) and Taylor Lucas (Zoë McLellan) and served as a backdoor pilot for a proposed series titled Whistlers, conceived as a Lethal Weapon‑style action‑comedy with a mismatched female detective duo. The project did not advance, in part because neither lead was an established star and the episode was perceived by executives as too transparently a pilot episode.

=== Unproduced concept ===
- G-Girls – A proposed spin-off developed by Fred Silverman as a 1990s variation on Charlie's Angels, with Reginald VelJohnson as a federal agent running a Las Vegas strip casino employing three undercover female agents posing as strippers. The title was a play on "government agents" and "G‑string." Writer‑producer Lee Goldberg has stated that star Dick Van Dyke declined to participate in any backdoor pilot built around the concept, and "G-Girls was never filmed.

== International ==
- Australia: 10 Bold
- Canada: CTV Television Network and BOOK television
- Czech republic: Prima televize
- Estonia: TV3.
- France: France 2
- Finland: Yle.
- Germany: ProSieben, Kabel eins and Sat.1 Gold.
- Hungary: Viasat 3 and Duna.
- Ireland: RTÉ2.
- Italy: Rete 4 and Canale 5.
- Japan: NHK and Super! drama TV.
- Philippines: TV5
- Slovenia: Pop and TV3 Slovenia.
- Spain: Telecinco
- Sweden: Kanal 5, Kanal 9 and Tv4 Play
- United Kingdom: BBC One (until November 2011), BBC Two (until March 2007), Alibi, the Hallmark Channel and Channel 5 since January 2014. Now being repeated on CBS Justice since March 2017.
- United States: CBS (original run) Ion Television ran reruns of the show from the summer of 2003 to the spring of 2005. Hallmark Channel (ran reruns until the fall of 2008), Hallmark Movies & Mysteries (movies and 2-parts only). Currently airing on Starz Encore Suspense weeknights at 10pm ET and weekdays at 11 am ET on MeTV
- Turkey: TNT Turkey.

== Home media ==
On September 12, 2006, CBS Home Entertainment (with distribution by Paramount Pictures) released the complete Season 1 of Diagnosis: Murder on Region 1 DVD. The set included the Jake and the Fatman episode 4.19, "It Never Entered My Mind," which introduced the character of Dr. Mark Sloan. It did not however, include the TV movies that were made prior to the show's premiere. Seasons 2 and 3 are also now available. After two years since the release of the first season on Region 1 DVD, a Region 2 DVD of Diagnosis: Murder – Series 1 was released on May 5, 2008, according to Amazon.co.uk

On June 26, 2012, Visual Entertainment released "Diagnosis Murder – The Movie Collection" on DVD in Region 1 for the first time. In the US, the release was distributed by Alchemy. The three-disc set featured all three TV movies that aired in 1992/1993 and spawned the weekly TV series as well as the two TV movies that aired after the series ended.

On December 31, 2012, it was announced that VEI had acquired the rights to the series (via their sublicensing deal with CBS) and planned on releasing the remaining seasons on DVD in 2013. They subsequently released the fourth and fifth seasons both as two-part volumes and as a complete set on August 27, 2013. The sixth season was released on November 12, 2013, in Canada while it was released in the US on November 26, 2013. The seventh season was released on November 19, 2013, in Canada and in the US on February 11, 2014; the eighth and final season on November 19, 2013, in Canada and in the US on May 27, 2014. VEI also released The Complete Collection On November 12, 2013. It includes all 178 episodes, all 5 of the TV movies, The Jake and the Fatman Episode "It Never Entered My Mind", and an episode of Mannix Called "Little Girl Lost" which was a prequel to the episode "Hard Boiled Murder" on a 51-disc set. It also has an exclusive to The Complete Collection a clip of Van Dyke as Rob Petrie in Obsession Part 2.

On April 7, 2017, VEI released Diagnosis: Murder: The Complete Collection on Blu-Ray. Total number of discs is 27 and has the same extras that are in VEI's DVD release.

In Australia, Region 4, Season 1 was released on May 15, 2008, and Season 2 on November 6, 2008, no further releases were released. These two releases were distributed by Paramount. On October 14, 2015 Season 1 and 2 were re-released along with Season 3. Season 4 followed on April 20, 2016 and Season 5 on July 20, 2016. These were distributed by Madman Entertainment. Season 6 was released on May 3, 2017, Season 7 on June 7, 2017 and Season 8 on July 5, 2017. These were distributed by Via Vision Entertainment. The Movie Collection was released on August 7, 2019.

DVD Release	Episodes	Originally aired	Release date	
DVD Release	Episodes	Originally aired	Region 1	Region 2
Television Movie Collection	5 TV Movies	1992–2002	June 26, 2012	N/A
The Complete First Season	19 + Pilot	1993-94	September 12, 2006	May 5, 2008
The Complete Second Season	22	1994-95	June 12, 2007	February 9, 2009
The Complete Third Season	18	1995-96	December 4, 2007	July 13, 2009
The Fourth Season	23	1996-97	August 27, 2013 (Canada); February 18, 2014 (USA)	TBA
The Fifth Season	24	1997-98	August 27, 2013 (Canada); October 1, 2013 (USA)	TBA
The Sixth Season	20	1998-99	November 12, 2013 (Canada); November 26, 2013 (USA)	TBA
The Seventh Season	22	1999–2000	November 19, 2013 (Canada); February 11, 2014 (USA)	TBA
The Final Season	21	2000-01	November 19, 2013 (Canada); May 27, 2014 (USA)	TBA
The Complete Collection	169 Episodes + Pilot + The 5 TV Movies + Little Girl Lost + Bonus Scene	1991–2002	November 12, 2013	TBA

As of 2025, the show has been remastered in native 16:9 letterbox, and is currently available to stream on Hallmark+.

== Novels ==
Between 2003 and 2007, eight original novels were published based on the TV series. All of them were written by Lee Goldberg, a former executive producer and writer on the TV series. According to his website, there will be no more books based on the show. The books are, in order:

- Diagnosis Murder: The Silent Partner
- Diagnosis Murder: The Death Merchant
- Diagnosis Murder: The Shooting Script
- Diagnosis Murder: The Waking Nightmare
- Diagnosis Murder: The Past Tense
- Diagnosis Murder: The Dead Letter
- Diagnosis Murder: The Double Life
- Diagnosis Murder: The Last Word

The Past Tense is a prequel to the episode "Voices Carry", which guest-starred Jack Klugman as Harry Trumble, and chronicles Dr. Mark Sloan's first homicide investigation. The final book in the series, The Last Word, is a sequel of sorts to the episodes "Obsession" and "Resurrection" and features the return of Carter Sweeney, who was played by Arye Gross in the TV series.

=== Crossover with Monk ===
Two of the characters in The Death Merchant later reappeared in Lee Goldberg's series of novels based on the television series Monk:

- Lt. Ben Keoloha appears in Mr. Monk Goes to Hawaii as the Kauai police lieutenant that Adrian Monk and Sharona Fleming assist in solving several unsolved cases on the island.

== Non-fiction books ==
In August 2026, Bear Manor Media released Diagnosis Murder: Classic TV Before Its Time … Comfort Entertainment with a Twist by Linda Alexander. The book is an in-depth, 500+ page history of the entire production, from creation to cancellation, and includes a foreword by Lee Goldberg, who was a writer & executive producer on the show, as well as interviews with just about everybody else still living who was involved with the show (with the notable exception of Dick Van Dyke). Interviewees include Barry Van Dyke, Victoria Rowell, Scott Baio, director Christian A. Nyby II, DP Frank Thackery, and writer/producers Dean Hargove, Tom Chehak, Chris Abbott, Robin Bernheim, William Rabkin, David Carren, and Jacqueline Blain, among many others.
