= Paul Bishop (police officer) =

American police officer

- Born: Shoreham-By-Sea, England
- Police career
- Department: Los Angeles Police Department
- Service years: 1977–2012
- Rank: Sworn in as an officer (1977); Police Officer II; Police Officer III; Detective I Detective II; Detective III
- Awards: Detective of the Year; Quality and Productivity Commission Award
- Other work: Author, Screenwriter

Paul Bishop is an author and a detective in the Los Angeles Police Department retiring with the rank of Detective III. He is a published novelist and has produced episodic television and feature film scripts. As a nationally recognized interrogator, Paul also co-starred with his professional partner, bestselling author and prosecutor, Mary Hanlon-Stone, as the regular interrogators and driving force behind the ABC reality show Take The Money and Run from producers Bertram Van Munster and Jerry Bruckheimer.

== Works ==
=== Series ===
==== Calico Jack Walker/Tina Tamiko ====
- Hot Pursuit (Previous title: Citadel Run – 1988; e-Book 2011)
- Deep Water (Previous title: Sand Against the Tide – 1990; e-Book 2011)

==== Ian Chapel ====
- Penalty Shot (Previous title: Chapel of the Ravens – 1991; e-Book 2011)

==== Fey Croaker ====
- Croaker: Kill Me Again (1994; e-Book 2011)
- Croaker: Twice Dead (1996; e-Book 2011 called "Grave Sins")
- Croaker: Tequila Mockingbird (1997; e-Book 2011)
- Croaker: Chalk Whispers (2000; e-Book 2011)
- Croaker: Pattern Of Behavior and Other Stories (2005; e-Book 2011) (The title story in this collection and a second short story both feature Croaker)

=== Other Novels ===
- Shroud Of Vengeance (1987)
- Running Wylde – Short Stories (e-Book 2011)
- Suspicious Minds (Paperback / e-Book 2011)
- Felony Fists (as Jack Tunney) (Paperback / e-Book 2011)
- Swamp Walloper (as Jack Tunney) (Paperback / e-Book 2013)
- Three Punch Combo (Paperback / e-book 2014)
- Lie Catchers (Paperback / e-Book 2015)

=== Non-Fiction ===
- 52 Weeks—52 Western Novels
- 52 Weeks—52 Western Movies
- 52 Weeks—52 Western TV Shows
