= Talip Peshkepia =

American film composer and songwriter (born 1986)

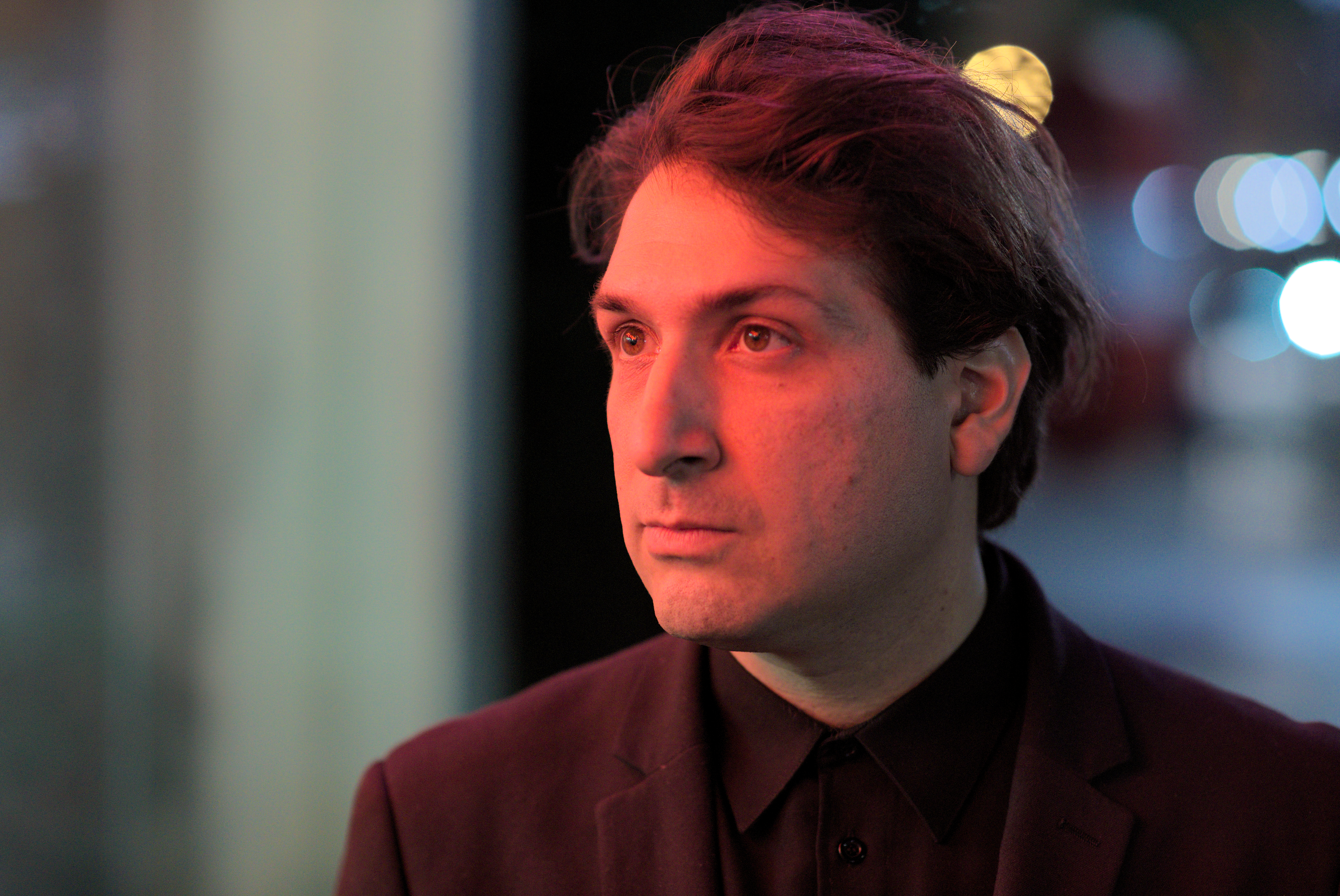
- Born: January 3, 1986 (age 40); Los Angeles, California, United States
- Occupations: Film composer, Songwriter
- Years active: 2009 - Present
- Notable work: Shining Stars (2010)

Talip Paul Peshkepia (born January 3, 1986) is an American film composer and songwriter. He is best known for his work on Shining Stars (2010).

== Early life ==
Peshkepia was born in Los Angeles, California. Talip grew up in Pico Rivera, California. Talip attended high school in Downey, California at Warren high school up until his junior year when he then went to El Rancho High school in Pico Rivera, California.

Talip played in multiple bands during his middle and high school years. He started Crop Circle with his neighbor Marco Gutierrez, and friend Andrew Lujon. Later adding Marcos friend Anthony Marquez. Talip also was in Ska bands by the name The Apathetics and The Briefcases.

Talip went to First Presbyterian Church of Downey, where he played in the band for service and worship. He also attended The First Church of Downey where his band Crop Circle would play in after hours.El Rancho High Talent Show 2001 Crop Circle- The Alana Song

== Career ==
From 2009 to 2011, Peshkepia performed and recorded the orchestral pop albums Opportunities (2009), Shining Stars (2010), and Post Mortem (2011) under the songwriting moniker "Paulie Pesh."

Peshekpia's song "Shining Stars" is featured in the Josh Stolberg film Conception (2011) starring Alan Tudyk and David Arquette.

Peshkepia's song "Nothing Happened" is featured in the "Despicable B" episode of Gossip Girl.

In 2013, Peshkepia (credited as "Paulie Pesh") performed acoustic and electric guitar on Chris Schlarb's Psychic Temple II (2013) (Asthmatic Kitty).

Peshkepia partnered with Jared Freitag of Backwoods Animation Studio to launch an animated children's musical series called The Scribbles (2017).

Peshkepia scored the Rob Margolies film Weight (2018) starring Zachery Byrd, Ashley Johnson, Jason Mewes, Randy Quaid, and Kathy Najimy.

Peshekpia scored the Matt Leal film What We Leave Behind (2018) starring Kansas Bowling.

== Personal life ==
Peshkepia is of Italian, Albanian, and Mexican descent.

== Discography ==
Studio Albums

=== Solo ===
- Nine Spirits (TBA)

=== As Paulie Pesh ===
- Opportunities (2009)
- Shining Stars (2010)
- Post Mortem (2011)

== Filmography ==
Film

Year	Title	Director	
Year	Title	Director	Credited as
2009	Just Breathe	Sean Willis	Composer
2011	Conception	Josh Stolberg	Soundtrack
2014	Jedi Junior High	Heidi Burkey	Soundtrack
2018	Weight	Rob Margolies	Composer
2018	What We Leave Behind	Matt Leal	Composer

Television

Year	Title	Episode	
Year	Title	Episode	Credited as
2012	Gossip Girl	Despicable B (S5E21)	Soundtrack
2015-2017	Born This Way	Seasons 1-3	Composer
