= Victoria Rowell =

American actress (born 1959)

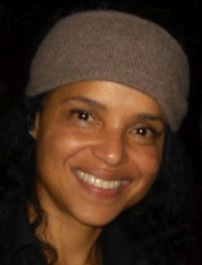
- Rowell in 2012
- Born: Victoria Lynn Rowell; May 10, 1959 (age 67); Portland, Maine, U.S.
- Occupations: Actress, director, screenwriter, producer, ballet dancer, model
- Years active: 1979–present
- Spouses: Tom Fahey (m. 1989; div. 1990) Radcliffe Bailey (m. 2009; div. 2014)
- Children: 2

Victoria Lynn Rowell (born May 10, 1959) is an American actress and filmmaker. She began her career as a ballet dancer and model in 1979 before making her acting debut in the 1987 comedy film Leonard Part 6. In 1990, Rowell joined the cast of the CBS daytime soap opera The Young and the Restless as Drucilla Winters, her signature and longest role on television, for which she was nominated for three Daytime Emmy Awards. She departed from the show in 2007. Rowell is also well known for her role as Dr. Amanda Bentley in the CBS medical crime drama Diagnosis: Murder (1993–2001). From 1993 to 2000, she appeared on both series simultaneously.

Rowell has had a number of roles in feature films. She starred alongside Eddie Murphy in the 1992 comedy The Distinguished Gentleman, and later had roles in the films Dumb and Dumber (1994) and Barb Wire (1996). She is an 11-time NAACP Image Awards winner.

== Early life ==
Victoria Lynn Rowell was born in Portland, Maine, on May 10, 1959. Her biological mother, Dorothy Rowell, was of English descent and a Mayflower descendant, and her birth father, whose surname was Wilson, was of Jamaican descent. Rowell knew very little about her father. Dorothy, who suffered from schizophrenia, took a taxi to a hospital to give birth to Rowell, leaving a son and two small daughters unsupervised. When she was 16 days old, Rowell, along with her two sisters, Sheree and Lori, were surrendered to child services.

While living in Maine with foster parents Agatha C. and Robert Armstead, Rowell, then eight, began ballet lessons. She became a member of Sigma Gamma Rho sorority, an African-American Greek-lettered sorority. After dancing with the American Ballet Theater II and the Juilliard School of Music Dance Extension program with Antony Tudor, Rowell accepted guest-artist teaching posts in New England.

== Career ==
In the 1980s, Rowell became an in-demand runway and catalog model. Rowell made her film debut in the 1987 comedy film Leonard Part 6 opposite Bill Cosby and later had a recurring role on The Cosby Show In 1988, she also had the recurring role of Nella Franklin on the CBS daytime soap opera, As the World Turns.

In 1990, Rowell was cast as street urchin-turned-ballet dancer Drucilla Barber on the CBS daytime soap opera, The Young and the Restless. Rowell became a fan favorite and was nominated for three Daytime Emmy Awards in 1996, 1997, and 1998. She won 11 NAACP Image Awards for her portrayal of Drucilla. Rowell's first run as Drucilla was from 1990 to 1998. She briefly returned in 2000, then returned on a regular basis from 2002 until early 2007. In 2007, Rowell became unhappy with the soap opera behind the scenes, labeling daytime television and The Young and the Restless as racist for not having enough African-American cast and crew. She also argued the directions of her storylines which were not heard, prompting her to leave. Within the storyline, Drucilla fell off a cliff and was presumed dead as her body was never found. Rowell has openly expressed pleasure in returning, and due to the character's strong appeal and popularity, viewers have begged the series to rehire her. However, CBS has stated that having Drucilla return is not the creative decision they are looking for, which has disappointed fans of the actress. In 2014, Rowell posted a series of tweets criticizing the show for not having enough African-Americans in decision-making positions. "Young & Restless on air for 40 years, loyally watched by their absolute competitive-edge audience (blacks) & not one black Exec producer?" – she tweeted. Her tweets coincided with the series' 41st anniversary.

From 1993 to 2001, Rowell starred as Dr. Amanda Bentley in the CBS primetime series Diagnosis: Murder, opposite Dick Van Dyke, replacing Cynthia Gibb from the original made-for-television movie. For much of Rowell's stint on Diagnosis: Murder, she was working on that show and on The Young and the Restless simultaneously. One episode of Diagnosis Murder centered around murder on the set of The Young and the Restless; Rowell was featured as both Amanda and Drucilla in that episode. The series run from 1993 to 2001, producing 178 episodes and two television movies, aired after the series' cancellation. Diagnosis: Murder has also run in syndication as of 1997.

In 1990s, Rowell co-starred in several films. She had the role of Eddie Murphy's character's love interest in the 1992 comedy film, The Distinguished Gentleman. In 1994, she played FBI agent Beth Jordan in comedy film Dumb and Dumber. She co-starred opposite Mario Van Peebles in the science-fiction crime film Full Eclipse (1993), and had a major role in the box office failure action film Barb Wire (1996) with Pamela Anderson. In 1997 she appeared in the critically acclaimed drama film, Eve's Bayou. In the 2000s, she appeared in the number of small films, such as Motives and A Perfect Fit. In 2006, she co-starred as Samuel L. Jackson's character wife in Home of the Brave. She also had the recurring roles on Single Ladies and Law & Order: Special Victims Unit.

In spring 2009, Rowell signed a six-figure deal with Atria Books for a book about the world of daytime TV. She released her memoirs called The Women Who Raised Me: A Memoir in 2008. She later released Secrets of a Soap Opera Diva: A Novel (2010) The Young and the Ruthless: Back in the Bubbles (2013).

Rowell created, directed, produced and starred in the comedy series The Rich and the Ruthless. The series premiered in 2017 and ended in 2021. In 2018, she also created miniseries Jacqueline and Jilly for Urban Movie Channel. In 2020 she made her feature directorial debut with Everything Is Fine. She later directed films A Rich Christmas (2021) starring Bill Bellamy for BET+, Stranger Next Door (2022) starring Vicky Jeudy and Skyh Black for Lifetime, Montross: Blood Rules (2022) for TV One, Catfish Christmas (2022), and Blackjack Christmas (2022) for BET+. In 2022, she made her return to CBS with a recurring role in the medical drama Good Sam. In 2024, she co-starred alongside Diane Keaton, Kathy Bates and Alfre Woodard in the comedy film Summer Camp.

== Legal issues ==
In February 2015, Rowell filed a lawsuit against CBS, Sony Pictures Television, Bell Dramatic Serial Company, and Bell-Phillip Television Production Inc, alleging racial discrimination and retaliation. In the suit, Rowell alleges that since 2010 she had made several attempts to be re-employed at The Young and the Restless or employed at sister soap, The Bold and the Beautiful, but was repeatedly denied due to her outspokenness regarding the lack of diversity both in front of and behind the cameras at CBS. The same day the suit was filed, CBS released a statement saying that Rowell left the cast of her own initiative, the suit was without merit, and they would vigorously defend the case. In June 2015, Rowell's legal team filed a declaration in furtherance of the lawsuit. In the declaration, Rowell alleges that she was the target of racially motivated attacks on the set of The Young and the Restless, at the hands of former co-stars, Michelle Stafford, Melody Thomas Scott, and Peter Bergman. In November 2015, the judge presiding over the case dismissed the suit without prejudice. Rowell's legal team resubmitted an amended claim that included an allegation against Corday Productions and Sony Pictures Television alleging that she pursued a role on the Sony and Corday produced NBC soap Days of Our Lives, but was removed from the audition list. In June 2016, the judge again dismissed the previous claims against CBS and Bell-Phillip Television Production Inc., allowing Rowell to continue the suit against Corday Productions and Sony Pictures Television. In February 2017, it was reported the case had been settled.

In September 2018, in the wake of Les Moonves' resignation as the chairman and CEO of CBS due to sexual misconduct allegations, Rowell took to her Twitter account to directly accuse Moonves of hindering her career. Partially quoting Moonves' statement denying the accusations that he attempted to damage the careers of certain women, she tweeted:

"And I have never used my position to hinder the advancement or careers of women," Moonves responded. #LIAR. Your loafer heel has been on my neck for over 11 years all because I cited a lack of substantive of diversity at CBS behind the camera #MeToo #RetaliationIsIllegal #Bully

== Personal life ==
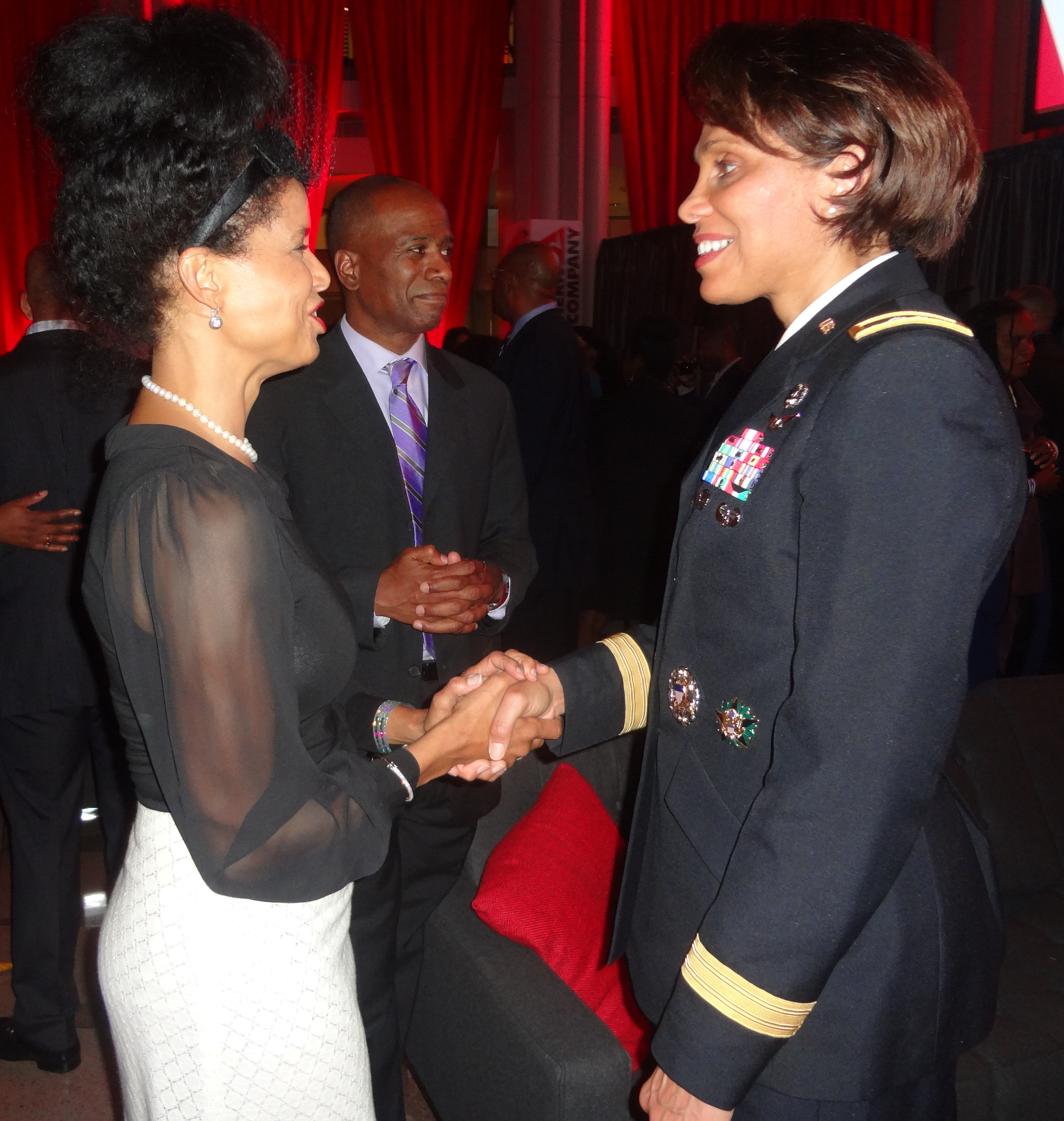
Rowell (left) with Maj. Gen. Nadja West in Washington, D.C. in 2013

Rowell's first marriage was to Tom Fahey in 1989. They had a daughter, Maya, and divorced the following year. Rowell had a long-term relationship with musician Wynton Marsalis; and they had a son, Jasper. In May 2008, Rowell announced her engagement to Radcliffe Bailey, an Atlanta artist, at her annual High Tea at Noon fundraiser. Rowell and Radcliffe married on June 27, 2009, in Dublin, New Hampshire. On January 2, 2014, Bailey filed for divorce from Rowell.

=== Work with foster children ===
In 1990, Rowell founded the "Rowell Foster Children Positive Plan," which gives emotional support and financial aid to foster children, especially to those who aspire to become actors and dancers – the road Rowell took. In 2004, she was a special guest on the talk show Dr. Phil, in which she gave an emancipated foster child a chance at a job with Sony, dental care, and a scholarship from her foundation.

In May 2006, Rowell was awarded an honorary Doctorate of Humane Letters by the University of Southern Maine in recognition of her work for the benefit of foster children. In 2007, Rowell published a memoir of her life that focused on her time in foster care. Entitled The Women Who Raised Me, Rowell discusses all of the foster mothers who cared for her and for her sisters. She also pays tribute to the women in a documentary film, The Mentor, that she participated in. Rowell says that she began writing the book when Y&R turned down her offer to write for the show. She began a national book tour in April 2007.

In March 2008, Rowell was the first recipient of the Gift of Adoption Celebration of Adoption Award, an award given to individuals or groups who are helping to unite children with adoptive families.

In March 2012, Rowell's book, Tag, Toss & Run: 40 Classic Lawn Games, co-authored with environmental activist Paul Tukey, was released.

== Filmography ==
=== Film ===
Year	Title	Role	Notes
1987	Leonard Part 6	Joan Parker	Spy parody film
1992	The Distinguished Gentleman	Celia Kirby	Political comedy film
1994	Dumb and Dumber	FBI Agent Beth Jordan	Road buddy comedy film
1995	One Red Rose	Rose	Short film
1996	Barb Wire	Dr. Corrina 'Cora D' Devonshire	Superhero film Based on the Dark Horse Comics character of the same name
1996	Dr. Hugo	Stevie Hobbs	Short film
1997	Eve's Bayou	Stevie Hobbs	Southern Gothic drama film
1998	Secrets	Delia	Short film
1999	Fraternity Boys	Ellen	Short film
1999	A Wake in Providence	Alicia	Comedy film Also known as Almost Married
2003	Black Listed	Patricia Chambers	Crime drama film
2004	Motives	Detective Mary Pierce	Erotic thriller film
2005	A Perfect Fit	Sheila	Thriller film
2005	Midnight Clear	Angela Pressmore	Short film
2006	Home of the Brave	Penelope Marsh	Drama film
2008	Of Boys and Men	Aunt Janay	Drama film
2011	Death in the Family	Vicky Turner	Short film Also producer
2012	Jamaica and the Mystery of the Maroons	Herself	Short documentary film
2015	November Rule	Steve's Mother	Romantic comedy film
2015	What Love Will Make You Do	Sheila Boston	Romantic comedy film Also producer
2016	Soul Ties	Maybelle	Drama film
2018	Water in a Broken Glass	Aunt Jo	Romantic film
2019	I Love You	Barbara Mutch	Drama film Also producer and writer
2020	Anticipation	Doctor Collins	Short film
2020	Black Kids White Mama	Clair LaFree	Comedy film
2020	Birdie	Catherine Cooper	Drama film
2021	A Rich Christmas	Marie	Family film Also director and producer
2022	Montross: Blood Rules	Elaine Montross	Drama film Also director and producer
2022	A Christmas Gift	Marie	Holiday film
2022	Stranger Next Door	—N/a	Thriller film Director and producer
2022	Catfish Christmas	—N/a	Romantic holiday drama film Director and producer
2022	Blackjack Christmas	—N/a	Family film Director and producer
2023	Forgetting Christmas	Marie	Drama film
2024	Summer Camp	Evelyn	Comedy film
2024	A Christmas Miracle	Marie	Family film
2025	Forgetting	Marie	Drama film
2025	Jason's Lyric Live	Gloria	Drama film A Theatre production filmed live
2025	The Secret Between Us	Maxine	Romantic family drama film
2025	Love Offside	Dr. Hart	Drama film

=== Television films ===
Year	Title	Role	Notes
1993	Full Eclipse	Anna Dire	Directed by Anthony Hickox
1994	Secret Sins of the Father	Yolanda Seeley	Directed by Beau Bridges
2001	Feast of All Saints	Josette Metoyer	Directed by Peter Medak
2002	A Town Without Pity	Dr. Amanda Bentley	Directed by Christopher Hibler
2002	Without Warning	Dr. Amanda Bentley	Directed by Christian I. Nyby II
2007	Polly and Marie	Rebecca McCaw	Directed by Ian Truitner
2013	Marry Me for Christmas	Stephanie	Directed by Roger Melvin
2014	The Fright Night Files	Alexa	Directed by Russ Parr and R.L. Scott
2014	Marry Us for Christmas	Stephanie	Directed by Drew Powell
2015	Merry Christmas, Baby	Stephanie	Directed by Rhonda Baraka
2015	A Baby for Christmas	Stephanie	Directed by Rhonda Baraka
2016	You Can't Hurry Love	Ms. Joyce	Directed by Ogden Bass and Patricia Cuffie-Jones
2018	Chandler Christmas Getaway	Stephanie	Directed by Rhonda Baraka
2019	Pride & Prejudice: Atlanta	Catherine	Directed by Rhonda Baraka
2019	Twas the Chaos Before Christmas	Hazel Mitchell	Directed by Terri J. Vaughn
2024	Blended Christmas	Lilian	Directed by Tamala Baldwin

=== Television ===
Year	Title	Role	Notes
1988	As the World Turns	Nella Franklin	Recurring role
1989–90	The Cosby Show	Paula	Episodes: "Cliff's Wet Adventure" and "Theo's Dirty Laundry"
1990	The Fresh Prince of Bel-Air	Mimi Mumford	Episode: "Clubba Hubba"
1990–2021	The Young and the Restless	Drucilla Barber Winters	Series regular; role held from May 1990 to April 1998 and August 2002 to February 2007; Recurring; role held from February to September 2000; 2020–21 Archival footage
1991–93	Herman's Head	Susan Bracken	Episodes: "Bracken's Daughter" and "I Wanna Go Home"
1993–2001	Diagnosis: Murder	Amanda Bentley-Livingston	Series regular, 163 episodes
1995	Deadly Games	Courtney Lake	Episode: "Divorce Lawyer"
2001	Family Law	Ms. Wilkes	Episode: "Moving On"
2006	Noah's Arc	Vonda	Episodes: "Desperado" and "Give It Up"
2007	All of Us	Dr. Deborah Cooper	Episode: "He's Got Game"
2010	Ghost Whisperer	Ms. Adrienne	Episode: "Living Nightmare"
2012	Let's Stay Together	Anita Barnes	Episode: "Creepers"
2012	Single Ladies	Veronica	Recurring role, 3 episodes
2013–14	Law & Order: Special Victims Unit	Judge Delilah Mae Hawkins	Episodes: "Criminal Hatred" and "Comic Perversion"
2017	The Bay	Judge Iris Hopkins	Recurring
2017	Mann & Wife	Mrs. Delores Hobbs	Episode: "Ressured by the Mann"
2017–21	The Rich and the Ruthless	Kitty Barringer	Also creator, director and executive producer Indie Series Award for Best Ensemble in a Comedy (2018–19); Nominated — Indie Series Award for Best Supporting Actress in a Comedy (2018); Nominated — Indie Series Award for Best Directing – Comedy (2018); Nominated — Indie Series Award for Best Writing – Comedy (2018)
2019	Jacqueline and Jilly	Jacqueline Mitchell	Also creator, director and executive producer
2020	The Couch	—N/a	Episode: "Everything is Fine"; Writer
2020	The Waiting Room	Dr. Williams	Episodes: "Like, Comment, Subscribe" and "A Long Look in the Mirror"
2022	Good Sam	Tina Kingsley	Recurring role

=== Music videos ===
Year	Title	Role	Performer(s)	Notes
1985	Are You the Woman	Woman	Kashif feat. Whitney Houston	Uncredited; Directed by Luis Aira
1994	On Bended Knee	Girl in the Park	Boyz II Men	Directed by Lionel C. Martin
1997	How Come, How Long	Abused Woman	Babyface feat. Stevie Wonder	Directed by F. Gary Gray

== Awards and nominations ==
Year	Award	Category	Work	Result
1992	8th Soap Opera Digest Awards	Outstanding Female Newcomer: Daytime	The Young and the Restless	Nominated
1994	10th Soap Opera Digest Awards	Outstanding Scene Stealer	The Young and the Restless	Won
1994	26th NAACP Image Award	Outstanding Actress in a Daytime Drama Series	The Young and the Restless	Won
1995	11th Soap Opera Digest Awards	Hottest Female Star	The Young and the Restless	Nominated
1996	27th NAACP Image Award	Outstanding Actress in a Daytime Drama Series	The Young and the Restless	Won
1996	23rd Daytime Emmy Awards	Outstanding Supporting Actress in a Drama Series	The Young and the Restless	Nominated
1997	24th Daytime Emmy Awards	Outstanding Supporting Actress in a Drama Series	The Young and the Restless	Nominated
1997	28th NAACP Image Award	Outstanding Actress in a Daytime Drama Series	The Young and the Restless	Won
1998	25th Daytime Emmy Awards	Outstanding Supporting Actress in a Drama Series	The Young and the Restless	Nominated
1998	29th NAACP Image Award	Outstanding Actress in a Daytime Drama Series	The Young and the Restless	Won
1999	30th NAACP Image Award	Outstanding Actress in a Daytime Drama Series	Diagnosis Murder	Nominated
1999	30th NAACP Image Award	Outstanding Actress in a Daytime Drama Series	The Young and the Restless	Won
2001	31st NAACP Image Award	Outstanding Actress in a Daytime Drama Series	The Young and the Restless	Won
2003	34th NAACP Image Award	Outstanding Actress in a Daytime Drama Series	The Young and the Restless	Won
2003	18th Soap Opera Digest Awards	Favorite Return	The Young and the Restless	Nominated
2004	35th NAACP Image Award	Outstanding Actress in a Daytime Drama Series	The Young and the Restless	Won
2005	19th Soap Opera Digest Awards	Outstanding Actress in a Supporting Role	The Young and the Restless	Nominated
2005	36th NAACP Image Award	Outstanding Actress in a Daytime Drama Series	The Young and the Restless	Won
2006	37th NAACP Image Award	Outstanding Actress in a Daytime Drama Series	The Young and the Restless	Won
