= Chris Abbott =

American TV producer, writer (born 1947)

- Born: September 17, 1947 (age 78)
- Citizenship: American
- Occupation: Producer

Chris Abbott (born September 17, 1947) is an American television producer, writer and author.

== Life ==
She is a graduate of the University of Oregon, with an MFA from Bennington College in Vermont. She started her career writing for Little House on the Prairie. She also wrote for other primetime series such as B.L. Stryker, Legacy, Bandit: Bandit Goes Country, Revealing Evidence: Stalking The Honolulu Strangler, High Sierra Search And Rescue, Cagney & Lacey, Quantum Leap, Star Trek: Voyager and Star Trek: The Next Generation, and produced and wrote Magnum, P.I. (as Executive Story Consultant), Dr. Quinn, Medicine Woman (as Creative Consultant), and Diagnosis: Murder.

She has worked on the CBS Daytime serials The Bold and the Beautiful and The Young and the Restless. Abbott was nominated for a Daytime Emmy Award for best writing in 2006.

== Positions held ==
The Bold and the Beautiful

- Script Writer (2005 – August 2, 2006)

The Young and the Restless

- Script Writer (February 27, 2007 – March 22, 2007)
- Associate Head Writer (May 25, 2006 – June 20, 2006; January 2, 2007 – February 16, 2007)

== Books ==
- Ten Minutes to the Pitch (2005)

== Awards and nominations ==
Daytime Emmy Awards

- Nomination, 2006, Best Writing, The Bold and The Beautiful
