= Burt Prelutsky =

American screenwriter (1940–2021)

- Prelutsky c. 2007
- Born: Burton Prelutsky; January 5, 1940; Chicago, Illinois, U.S.
- Died: December 17, 2021 (aged 81); North Hills, California, U.S.
- Occupations: Television writer; newspaper columnist; author
- Writing career
- Language: English
- Years active: 1963–2018
- Genres: Television, journalism

Burton Prelutsky (January 5, 1940 – December 17, 2021) was an American screenwriter, newspaper columnist, and author.

== Early life and career ==
A graduate of Los Angeles Fairfax High School, Prelutsky was the film critic for the UCLA Daily Bruin and then a film critic for Los Angeles Magazine from 1961 to 1971, writing acerbic reviews that gained him a reputation as "the fastest barb in the west." He also wrote a weekly column for the Los Angeles Times' magazine, West.

In the late 1960s he wrote several episodes of the Dragnet television series.

He wrote eight episodes of the M*A*S*H television series during seasons four, five, and six, including "The Novocaine Mutiny", "The General's Practitioner", "The Grim Reaper", and "Quo Vadis, Captain Chandler?"

In 2000 Prelutsky was one of the earliest plaintiffs to sign on to a class action lawsuit brought against television talent agencies, networks and production studios accused of discrimination against older writers. The suit was settled in 2010 for $70 million.

== Awards and recognition ==
In 1985 Prelutsky won a Writers Guild of America Award in the original comedy anthology category for the 1983 television film Hobson's Choice. He was nominated for an Edgar Allan Poe Award in 1982 under the category "Best Television Feature or Miniseries" for his work on the 1981 television movie A Small Killing, and in 1976 was nominated for a Humanitas Prize in the category "30 Minute Network or Syndicated Television" for his work on the 1975 "Quo Vadis, Captain Chandler?" episode of M*A*S*H.

He received a Christopher Award in 1987 for A Winner Never Quits, a television movie that was broadcast on CBS in 1986.

== Personal life and death ==
On 14 January 2019, his third wife, of 33 years, Yvonne, died at age 81.

Prelutsky died on December 17, 2021, at the age of 81.
