= Mr. Monk Is a Mess =

2012 novel by Lee Goldberg

- 1st edition 2012 hard cover
- Author: Lee Goldberg
- Language: English
- Series: Monk mystery novel series
- Genre: Mystery novel
- Publisher: Signet Books
- Publication date: June 5, 2012
- Publication place: United States
- Media type: Print (hardcover)
- Preceded by: Mr. Monk on Patrol
- Followed by: Mr. Monk Gets Even

Mr. Monk Is a Mess is the fourteenth novel by Lee Goldberg based on the television series Monk. It was published on June 5, 2012. Like the other Monk novels, the story is narrated by Natalie Teeger, Monk's assistant.

== Plot summary ==
After arriving home in San Francisco after working as police officers in Summit, New Jersey, Natalie Teeger finds a dead body lying in her bathtub. During the investigation by the police, marked money from a federal sting operation is found stuffed under Natalie's mattress. Natalie now needs Monk's help, but Monk is preoccupied with his own investigation. He's helping his brother find his missing girlfriend Yuki Nakamura, which is a problem that Monk is conflicted about, since he's happy to see Yuki leave.

As the case continues, it becomes clear that Yuki has a dangerous past, and that they are chasing a ruthless, cold-blooded killer.

== Mr. Monk and the Talking Car ==
Mr. Monk and the Talking Car is an excerpt from Mr. Monk Is a Mess that was published as a short story in the May 2012 issue of Ellery Queen's Mystery Magazine before the release of the book.

== List of characters ==
=== Characters from the television series ===
- Adrian Monk: the titular detective, played on the series by Tony Shalhoub
- Natalie Teeger: Monk's loyal assistant and the narrator of the book, played on the series by Traylor Howard
- Ambrose Monk: Monk's older brother, played on the series by John Turturro
- Randy Disher: The acting mayor of Summit, New Jersey, played on the series by Jason Gray-Stanford
- Leland Stottlemeyer: Homicide Captain on the San Francisco Police force, played in the series by Ted Levine

=== Original characters ===
- Amy Devlin: A lieutenant who is Stottlemeyer's right hand in the San Francisco Police Department
- Yuki Nakamara: Assistant to Dub Clemens until his death, now is the assistant and girlfriend of Ambrose Monk
- Ellen Morse: The owner of a shop in Summit, New Jersey that sells items made with sanitized excrement. Despite her profession, Adrian develops a relationship with her based on her love of symmetry and sanitization.
