= Monk season 7 =

Season of television series

Monk
- Season 7
- DVD cover
- Starring: Tony Shalhoub Traylor Howard Ted Levine Jason Gray-Stanford
- No. of episodes: 16

Release
- Original network: USA Network
- Original release: July 18, 2008 – February 20, 2009

Season chronology
- ← Previous; Season 6 Next → Season 8

The seventh season of Monk was originally broadcast in the United States on USA Network from July 18, 2008, to February 20, 2009. It consisted of 16 episodes. Tony Shalhoub, Traylor Howard, Ted Levine and Jason Gray-Stanford reprised their roles as the main characters. A DVD of the season was released on July 21, 2009.

== Crew ==
Andy Breckman continued his tenure as show runner. Executive producers for the season included Breckman, David Hoberman, series star Tony Shalhoub, writer Tom Scharpling and Rob Thompson. Universal Media Studios was the primary production company backing the show. Randy Newman's theme ("It's a Jungle Out There") continued to be used, while Jeff Beal's original instrumental theme could be heard in some episodes. Directors for the season included Randall Zisk, David Hoberman, Michael W. Watkins, David Breckman and Andrei Belgrader. Writers for the season included Andy Breckman, Hy Conrad, Daniel Dratch, Tom Gammill, Dylan Morgan, Max Pross, Salvatore Savo, Josh Siegal, Joe Toplyn, Tom Scharpling and Peter Wolk.

== Cast ==
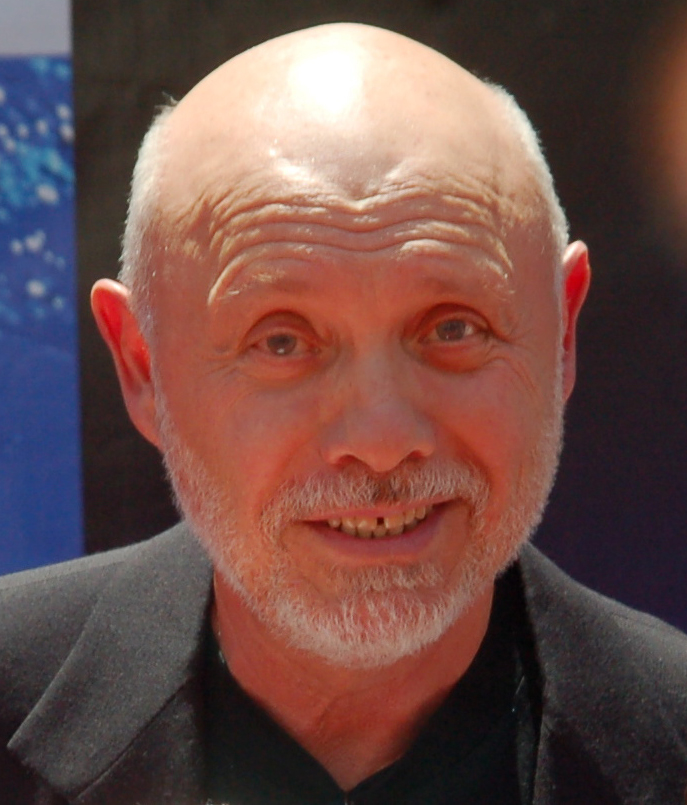
Héctor Elizondo made his debut this season as Dr. Neven Bell after the death of Stanley Kamel

All four main characters returned for the seventh season: Tony Shalhoub as former homicide detective Adrian Monk, Traylor Howard as Monk's faithful assistant Natalie Teeger, Ted Levine as SFPD captain Leland Stottlemeyer, and Jason Gray-Stanford as Lieutenant Randy Disher.

Héctor Elizondo joined the show as Dr. Neven Bell, Monk's new psychiatrist. Elizondo was cast after the death of the actor Stanley Kamel. Emmy Clarke returned as Julie Teeger, Natalie's daughter, and Tim Bagley reprised his role as Harold Krenshaw, Monk's number-one rival. Melora Hardin continued to portray Trudy Monk, Monk's deceased wife. Casper Van Dien made his first appearance as Lt. Steven Albright, a new love interest for Natalie who was a comrade of Natalie's late husband, Mitch, in the Navy. Jarrad Paul made his final appearance as Monk's upstairs neighbor, Kevin Dorfman. The season saw the return of various villains and acquaintances from the past in the 100th episode.

== Episodes ==
No. overall	No. in season	Title	Directed by	Written by	Original release date	U.S. viewers (millions)
94	1	"Mr. Monk Buys a House"	Randall Zisk	Story by : Andy Breckman and Anthony Maranville; Teleplay by : Andy Breckman	July 18, 2008	5.64
Dr. Kroger's unexpected death has Monk mourning, searching for a new therapist, and overly sensitive to his piano-practising neighbour, to the point of buying a new house. He discovers his handyman Jake (Brad Garrett) is not as honest as his nickname, when Jake begins dismantling the insides. Note: This is the first episode with Dr. Neven Bell (Héctor Elizondo).
95	2	"Mr. Monk and the Genius"	Michael W. Watkins	Joe Toplyn	July 25, 2008	5.06
Monk matches wits with a chess master (David Strathairn) who murders his wives. Also guest stars Evan Peters.
96	3	"Mr. Monk Gets Lotto Fever"	Michael Zinberg	Hy Conrad	August 1, 2008	4.60
Natalie's unexpected celebrity status when she replaces a murdered TV lottery hostess makes Monk jealous—until he has to clear her and Stottlemeyer of accusations they rigged the counting machine.
97	4	"Mr. Monk Takes a Punch"	Barnet Kellman	Salvatore Savo	August 8, 2008	3.62
Monk gets into the ring when a heavyweight boxer, Ray Regis (James Lesure), narrowly escapes a professional hit days before a title shot and asks him to keep a sad secret in return for helping Monk prepare for a mandatory police associate physical. Meanwhile, the police hire Monk to find out who put out the hit on Regis. Also guest stars Robert Loggia.
98	5	"Mr. Monk Is Underwater"	Paris Barclay	Jack Bernstein	August 15, 2008	4.65
Monk and Natalie are asked by one of Mitch's old friends, Steven Albright (Casper Van Dien), to investigate the suspicious death of a second-in-command who apparently shot himself in a locked room on a Navy submarine prior to a surprise drill. But Monk is terrified when they end up stuck on the submarine in the middle of a new exercise, all the while hallucinating that Dr. Bell is with them. He becomes suspicious of the submarine's commander (William Atherton), but cannot prove a thing due to being trapped in a ballast tank that is filling with water.
99	6	"Mr. Monk Falls in Love"	Arlene Sanford	Josh Siegal and Dylan Morgan	August 22, 2008	4.57
Monk falls for an immigration counselor (Joanna Pacuła) subsequently accused of murdering a taxi driver who proved to be a warlord known as the "Butcher of Zemenia" in her homeland. Uncovering the truth has fateful consequences for his budding romance despite her innocence.
100	7	"Mr. Monk's 100th Case"	Randall Zisk	Tom Scharpling	September 5, 2008	4.99
The TV news magazine InFocus profiles Monk as he pursues a serial killer for his one-hundredth case. But after viewing the documentary, Monk begins to suspect that a second killer may have been responsible for the fourth and last murder. Monk considers retiring since 100 cases is, for him, a nice even number to end his career on, until Natalie points out that the additional murder is technically his 101st. The profile (led by Eric McCormack) includes interviews with many of Monk's companions (including John Turturro, Sarah Silverman, Brooke Adams, and Kathryn Joosten) and enemies (including Tim Bagley, Howie Mandel, Andy Richter, David Koechner, Angela Kinsey and Ricardo Chavira).
101	8	"Mr. Monk Gets Hypnotized"	Michael W. Watkins	Tom Gammill and Max Pross	September 12, 2008	5.02
When an actress (Dina Meyer) disappears in the middle of a messy divorce, apparently abducted by her husband (Henry Czerny), Monk's companions are not able to get any help from him, because Monk has paid a secret visit to a hypnotist (Richard Schiff) suggested by Harold Krenshaw (Tim Bagley) and is acting like a six-year-old. But when the actress turns up alive after killing her husband in what looks like self-defense, Monk's naiveté might be what is needed to find out what really happened in her disappearance.
102	9	"Mr. Monk and the Miracle"	Andrei Belgrader	Peter Wolk	November 28, 2008	4.39
Three homeless men hire a reluctant Monk to prove their friend was murdered and stuffed in an old refrigerator, while a reputed "miracle fountain" promising to cure the sick or injured—including a surprised Stottlemeyer when he drinks from it—leads Stottlemeyer to leave the police force in order to join a monastery. Guest stars Michael Badalucco.
103	10	"Mr. Monk's Other Brother"	David Hoberman	David Breckman	January 9, 2009	5.24
Monk is shocked when his delinquent half-brother, Jack Jr. (Steve Zahn), escapes from prison, breaks into his apartment, and asks him to prove he did not murder a prison social worker. Also guest stars Titus Welliver.
104	11	"Mr. Monk on Wheels"	Anton Cropper	Nell Scovell	January 16, 2009	4.94
When Natalie accidentally helps a thief steal the bicycle of a biotech CEO (Bradley Whitford), she ropes Monk into solving the theft. But when tracking down the thief, Monk is shot in the leg and begins using a wheelchair. Natalie's life becomes a living hell, having to take care of him all the time. Also guest stars Pamela Adlon.
105	12	"Mr. Monk and the Lady Next Door"	Tawnia McKiernan	Hy Conrad and Joe Toplyn	January 23, 2009	4.96
During a robbery at a museum of oddities, a thief kills a security guard by skewering him on a swordfish display, then steals an egg-eating robot. During the investigation, Monk befriends a warm older woman (Gena Rowlands), but he has trouble believing the friendship comes without a catch, especially after her neighbor (Marcus Giamatti) becomes the primary suspect in the robbery of a jewelry store in which a manager is shot and killed.
106	13	"Mr. Monk Makes the Playoffs"	Randall Zisk	Josh Siegal and Dylan Morgan	January 30, 2009	5.39
Press box tickets to join Bob Costas himself for a big football playoff game lead to Monk and Stottlemeyer investigating the apparent attempted murder of a fan (Steve Monroe) in a tailgate party accident that proves more than it seems when a backup quarterback's game playbook turns up stolen.
107	14	"Mr. Monk and the Bully"	David Breckman	Joe Ventura	February 6, 2009	5.67
Monk and Natalie uncover a deeper—and fatal—mystery when Monk's childhood nemesis (Noah Emmerich) hires them to prove his wife's (Julie Bowen) infidelity.
108	15	"Mr. Monk and the Magician"	Randall Zisk	Andy Breckman	February 13, 2009	5.11
When Monk's upstairs neighbor Kevin Dorfman (Jarrad Paul) is strangled and killed on the night of his debut as a magician, Monk suspects world famous magician Karl Torini (Steve Valentine), but has no notion of what his motive might be. Moreover, Torini called from Reno, Nevada right before the murder, and he cannot have been in two places at once.
109	16	"Mr. Monk Fights City Hall"	Chuck Parker	Tom Scharpling and Josh Siegal and Dylan Morgan	February 20, 2009	5.54
When the parking garage where Monk's wife was killed is set for demolition, Monk intervenes but soon finds himself investigating the disappearance of a city official key to preserving the garage. Guest stars Jon Polito and Tim Bagley.

== Awards and nominations ==
=== Emmy Awards ===
- Outstanding Actor – Comedy Series (Tony Shalhoub, nominated)
- Outstanding Guest Actress – Comedy Series (Gena Rowlands for playing "Marge Johnson" in "Mr. Monk and the Lady Next Door", nominated)

=== Golden Globe Awards ===
- Best Actor – Musical or Comedy Series (Tony Shalhoub, nominated)

=== Screen Actors Guild ===
- Outstanding Actor – Comedy Series (Tony Shalhoub, nominated)
