= Mr. Monk and the Two Assistants =

2007 novel by Lee Goldberg

- 1st edition 2007 hardback cover
- Author: Lee Goldberg
- Language: English
- Series: Monk mystery novel series
- Genre: Mystery novel
- Publisher: Signet Books
- Publication date: July 3, 2007 (hardcover); January 2, 2008 (paperback)
- Publication place: United States
- Media type: Print (hardback & paperback)
- Pages: 279 pp
- ISBN: 0-451-22097-8
- OCLC: 77271229
- Dewey Decimal: 813/.54 22
- LC Class: PS3557.O3577 M725 2007
- Preceded by: Mr. Monk and the Blue Flu
- Followed by: Mr. Monk in Outer Space

Mr. Monk and the Two Assistants is the fourth novel based on the television series Monk by Lee Goldberg. It is the first Monk novel to be published in hardcover, on July 3, 2007. The paperback edition was released on January 2, 2008. The book won a Scribe Award for Best Original Novel (General) in 2008.

== Plot summary ==
Adrian Monk and Natalie Teeger take Julie to the hospital after she breaks her wrist during a soccer game. Monk sees his old assistant Sharona Fleming working as a nurse. She explains that after leaving Monk's employ to remarry her ex-husband, Trevor Howe and move to New Jersey, a friend of Trevor's from Los Angeles sold his landscaping business to Trevor. They moved to Los Angeles and took over the business. However, one of his clients, Ellen Cole, was found bludgeoned to death with a lamp in her house. Evidence suggests Trevor killed Cole when she caught him stealing her jewelry. Sharona has no trouble believing this in light of Trevor's addiction to get-rich-quick schemes, so she and Benjy have moved back to San Francisco, with Benjy staying with Sharona's sister Gail. Sharona would like her old job with Monk back, and there is hostility between her and Natalie. Moreover, after visiting Trevor in prison Natalie is convinced that he is innocent and that he sincerely reformed prior to remarrying Sharona. To save her job, she pressures Sharona and Monk to travel to Los Angeles and investigate Trevor's case.

Julie is inspired to rent the space on her cast to local businesses, a marketing technique which she dubs "cast-vertising". A pizzeria, Sorrento's, purchases her cast space and even agrees to pay her a sales commission if enough customers mention the offer printed on her cast, which gives them a discount if Julie is in Sorrento's at the time.

Monk, Natalie and Sharona meet Lieutenant Sam Dozier of the Los Angeles Police Department and visit Cole's house. Monk examines the scene and concludes that Trevor is innocent. He notices several clues that suggest Ellen Cole's killer was waiting for her, meaning that the murder was premeditated. They question some of the people closest to the victim, but Monk is convinced none of them is the killer. Monk, Natalie and Sharona head down to a bookstore to question the person who found the evidence to convict Trevor, LAPD consultant Ian Ludlow. Ludlow is a household name, writing his Detective Marshak novels at a rate of one every three months. While they are at the bookstore, Natalie buys a few of Ludlow's books, including his latest, Death Is the Last Word. The saleswoman at the bookstore mentions that Ludlow cannot pass a store without doing a book signing.

Stumped on who might have killed Cole and increasingly discontent at their exposure to Los Angeles smog, Monk insists on returning to San Francisco. Sharona remains behind in Los Angeles to do some asking around.

Joseph Cochran, a firefighter Natalie dated during a different investigation, informs Natalie that someone has stolen his fire company's hydraulic rescue equipment. Natalie recognizes that he is just looking for an excuse to begin seeing her again, and proposes that they not tell Monk about the stolen equipment and instead open a non-committal sexual relationship.

That Friday, when Natalie is leaving the house, her car starts leaking oil. Monk and Natalie are called by Captain Stottlemeyer and Lieutenant Disher to Baker Beach. A 37-year-old shoe salesman named Ronald Webster has been found dead, his midsection ripped open. The medical examiner determines the time of death to be sometime the night before, but cannot be more precise, given the body's immersion in water. The wounds on his body are not fatal. Monk concludes he was attacked by an alligator, since the teeth marks reflect uniform teeth and alligators kill their prey by holding them underwater until they drown, not ripping them apart.

With Stottlemeyer unable to mobilize a homicide task force until the medical examiner completes his autopsy, Monk and Natalie go to the shoe store where Webster worked, which is in Natalie's neighborhood. They talk to one of Webster's coworkers, who tells them Webster never talked about his background, and that his priest called because he did not appear at morning mass, a rarity for him. Monk and Natalie speak to Father Bowen, Webster's priest. Monk figures that Webster had committed a serious crime that caused him to attend daily mass and avoid talking about his background, and persuades Bowen to break the sanctity of confession. Bowen tells them Webster confessed to a hit and run.

Disher identifies Webster's victim as Dr. Paula Dalmas, an orthodontist in Walnut Creek. Even though she has no alibi for the night of the murder and even admits she can recognize Webster, Monk insists Dr. Dalmas is innocent, assured that an orthodontist could not possibly be a murderer.

The autopsy is completed: Webster was attacked by an alligator, but drowned in bath water, with his body moved to the beach post mortem. Natalie asks if the alligator bite could be faked, and Disher mentions that a character in Death Is the Last Word tried to make murder look like an alligator attack. Webster had his last meal (pizza) less than a half hour before he was killed. They check out Webster's apartment. Monk notices streaks on the floor, hydraulic fluid, and a drop of blood in the bathtub, suggesting this is where Webster was killed.

Natalie gets a call from Joe Cochran. Monk presses her for information, and when she reveals the theft that happened at Joe's firehouse on Wednesday, he insists on investigating. At the firehouse, Joe and Fire Captain Mantooth explain that while their crew was at a car fire in Washington Square, someone stole one of their Jaws of Life kits. The power unit is powered by gasoline, and the Jaws have a cutting force of 18,000 pounds per square inch. Monk concludes that Ian Ludlow started the car fire to lure the firemen out of the firehouse so that he could steal the Jaws of Life. Ludlow attached alligator jaws to the inside of the spreader to make the alligator bite look authentic. He claims Ludlow also murdered Cole, believing that Ludlow murders random people he meets at book signings and frames someone else for the crime just to get ideas for his novels. Stottlemeyer dismisses this theory as ludicrous (apart from the fake alligator attack), and Sharona and Natalie are outright furious at Monk for not taking the case seriously.

Minutes later Stottlemeyer brings Monk, Natalie and Sharona to Natalie's house, which is being searched by police. Ludlow accuses Sharona of murdering Ellen Cole and Natalie of murdering Ronald Webster. Sharona wanted to rid herself of her ne'er-do-well husband, and pressured Natalie to kill Webster as a distraction by threatening to take her job as Monk's assistant. The one person who could set up an eBay account in Trevor's name and plant the stolen goods in his truck was Sharona. Sharona never called Monk in to investigate, because Monk would have inevitably discovered she was the killer. Inspired by Death Is the Last Word, Natalie ordered an alligator jaw online the day before stealing the Jaws of Life. Natalie's credit card record proves the purchase, witness statements confirm Natalie is Joe's lover (and therefore would know about the Jaws of Life), Webster's pizza receipt shows he got the Julie discount and therefore proves Natalie was in the same place as Webster within a half hour of his death, and forensics has evidence matching Natalie's car to clues found in Webster's apartment. Stottlemeyer arrests both women.

Natalie and Sharona spend a night together in a holding cell, where they finally bond. The next day, Monk calls a meeting to present new evidence. He hypothesizes that Ludlow looked over Natalie's shoulder when she was entering her credit card number to purchase his books, used it to order the alligator head, and swiped it off Natalie's porch before Natalie got home. Ludlow claims that all of the events described happened before he arrived in San Francisco on Friday, but Monk says Ludlow's knowledge of the Julie discount suggested to him that Ludlow also was at Sorrento's Thursday night. He then found proof: the bookstore across the street from Sorrento's has a copy of Death Is the Last Word signed by Ludlow on Wednesday. Ludlow again could not pass a bookstore without doing a signing.

Ludlow is arrested, and Trevor (along with five other convicts that were caught with Ludlow's assistance) is set free. Monk reveals that Ludlow also signed stock at two other bookstores in San Francisco – one in Washington Square and one out at Baker Beach. Exonerated, Sharona and Natalie reunite with their families. Sharona returns to Los Angeles with Trevor and Benjy, leaving Monk in Natalie's hands, and giving Monk the loving goodbye she never said the first time.

== Characters ==
=== Characters from the television show ===
- Adrian Monk: the titular detective
- Natalie Teeger: Monk's loyal assistant, and the narrator of the book
- Sharona Fleming: Monk's former assistant
- Dr. Charles Kroger: Monk's psychiatrist; played on the series by Stanley Kamel;
- Captain Leland Stottlemeyer: Captain of the San Francisco Police Department's Homicide Division; Monk's oldest friend and former partner
- Lieutenant Randy Disher: Stottlemeyer's right-hand man
- Julie Teeger: Natalie's teenaged daughter
- Benjy Fleming (mentioned only): Sharona's teenaged son
- Trevor Howe: Sharona's husband, whom she remarried and returned to New Jersey with (erroneously referred to as 'Trevor Fleming');
- Gail Fleming (mentioned only): Sharona's younger sister

=== Original characters ===
- Ian Ludlow: a prolific mystery author, in the same vein as J.B. Fletcher. He consults for the LAPD in the same way that Monk consults for the San Francisco Police Department.
- Lieutenant Sam Dozier: LAPD detective, and Ludlow's biggest supporter
- Ellen Cole: Professor of Gender Studies at UCLA, and Trevor's supposed victim
- Sally Jenkins: Ellen Cole's ex-girlfriend
- Joe Cochran: Natalie's sometime-lover, a firefighter with the San Francisco Fire Department
- Ronald Webster: A shoe salesman in San Francisco
- Dr. Daniel Hetzer: An SFPD medical examiner
- Maurice: One of Ronald Webster's colleagues
- Father Bowen: Ronald Webster's priest at Mission Dolores
- Dr. Paula Dalmas: A woman who was seriously injured by Webster in a hit-and-run; now works as an orthodontist in Walnut Creek
- Captain Mantooth: Joe Cochran's fire captain
