= Mr. Monk and the Blue Flu =

Novel by Lee Goldberg

- 1st edition 2007 paperback cover
- Author: Lee Goldberg
- Language: English
- Series: Monk mystery novel series
- Genre: Mystery novel
- Publisher: Signet Books
- Publication date: January 2, 2007
- Publication place: United States
- Media type: Print (Paperback)
- Pages: 304 pp
- ISBN: 0-451-22013-7
- OCLC: 77178816
- LC Class: CPB Box no. 2704 vol. 4
- Preceded by: Mr. Monk Goes to Hawaii
- Followed by: Mr. Monk and the Two Assistants

Mr. Monk and the Blue Flu is the third novel by writer Lee Goldberg based on the television series Monk. In this novel, in response to a blue flu, the mayor of San Francisco reinstates several police officers who suffer from debilitating mental issues, including Adrian Monk. The squad of half-crazy detectives must contend not only with each other's eccentricities and a series of murders linked only by missing left shoes and shared birth dates, but their former friends on the other side of the labor dispute. Like the previous two books, the book is narrated by Natalie Teeger, Monk's assistant.

== Synopsis ==
The city is planning on making deep cuts in the San Francisco Police Department's pay, medical benefits, and pension contributions. Negotiations between the union and the city break down. Although it is illegal for police officers to strike, the police officers plan to call in sick until they get a better contract.

Mayor Barry Smitrovich, concerned about the lack of policing, reinstates Adrian Monk to the police department as acting captain of the homicide division. Although Natalie Teeger points out that the mayor is using Monk as a strikebreaker, Monk accepts the job, pleased to have his badge back. His assisting detectives are "Mad Jack" Wyatt, Cynthia Chow, and Frank Porter. Wyatt lost his badge due to lawsuits arising from his violent methods and disregard for civil rights. Chow is a conspiracy theorist who had her badge taken away due to her escalating paranoia. Porter is a veteran detective who was forced into retirement by the onset of senility. Their top priority is a series of stranglings of women whose left running shoes are taken. The press labels the killer the Golden Gate Strangler. Monk instructs Porter to check the dead women's credit card purchases and map out the crime scenes. However, none of the women made any shoe purchases on their credit cards.

In the Haight-Ashbury district, astrologer Allegra Doucet has been stabbed to death. The bathroom towel rack is broken, and there is no evidence pointing to forced entry. Doucet knew the killer, judging from the lack of defensive wounds. Madam Frost, Doucet's elderly competitor across the street, despised Doucet.

Natalie receives a call from Officer Curtis about a hit-and-run. The victim is John Yamada. While jaywalking to the market, he was struck by a car and killed. Monk realizes this is a premeditated murder when he notices skid marks that indicate the driver rapidly accelerated from a parking spot across the street. Mud drops further indicate that the driver used mud to conceal the license plate number. Natalie receives a call from Officer Curtis about another murder.

On Russian Hill, waitress Diane Truby tumbled in front of the same bus she disembarked from minutes earlier. Monk realizes that the killer sat on a vegetable crate not visible from the street and waited for Truby to pass.

Julie identifies the brands of each of the shoes the Golden Gate Strangler victims were wearing. She also says they are obsolete styles, sold out of trucks at freeway off-ramps which take only cash.

Chow informs Monk and Natalie that Max Collins, who sells artwork, lost millions of dollars in bad investments he made based on Doucet's advice. Collins states that he subsequently had a private investigator do some digging, and found that the companies Collins invested in were paying her to steer wealthy clients their way. On the night Doucet was murdered, he was visiting his mother, just around the corner. Natalie privately tells Monk that she is concerned that Monk will be working himself to death solving all of these homicides. Monk and Natalie have a secret rendezvous with Captain Stottlemeyer. The Captain is bitter that Monk has taken over his position. Stottlemeyer advises Monk that all three of his detectives have their own strengths and he needs to learn to delegate. Monk calls up Porter for information about John Yamada's ex-wife's stolen car and has Chow check up on Truby.

On the way over to the next murder, Natalie is issued a ticket, ostensibly because she was driving 28 miles per hour in a 25 mph zone; Natalie realizes Monk is being harassed because of his breaking the strike. Scott Eggers has been found dead in the alley behind his house. Monk sees that the killer bludgeoned Eggers, grabbed a grocery bag from the trash, and suffocated him.

Bertrum Gruber walks into the station to say he saw the Golden Gate Strangler while he was at the community garden in McKinley Park watering his strawberries. The last part of the stranger's license plate number was M567. Monk has Officer Curtis search for Ford Tauruses with M567 in the license plate number. Monk believes, however, that Gruber is lying, since it is not strawberry season. The vehicle matches to Charlie Herrin. During the SWAT team raid of Herrin's apartment, Herrin takes Monk hostage. Wyatt proposes shooting through Monk to get Herrin, prompting Herrin to give himself up. Forensic teams find dozens of left running shoes, including those taken from the three known victims of the Golden Gate Strangler. Monk believes that the other left shoes were simply stolen, not killed for.

The mayor holds a press conference in which he personally gives Bertrum Gruber the $250,000 reward for the capture of the Golden Gate Strangler, commends Monk for keeping the city safe, and derides the strikers. Stottlemeyer rebukes Monk for publicly endorsing the mayor and his belittling of the strikers, but Natalie argues that Monk deserves to enjoy the fulfillment of his dream to the fullest. The next morning, the detectives go over the four open murder cases (Allegra Doucet, John Yamada, Diane Truby and Scott Eggers). Porter points out that except for Doucet, all of the victims are 44 years old, and were born on the same date: February 20, 1962.

Monk and Natalie return to Doucet's house with Chow. They find that the last astrological chart Doucet brought up was for someone born in San Francisco on February 20, 1962. Monk hypothesizes that Doucet was killed while a client was in the bathroom. The client stepped out in time to see the killer, then fled out the window, breaking the towel rack in the process. The killer used the astronomical chart to narrow down the witness to someone born in San Francisco on that date. Officer Curtis calls Natalie to report a new homicide. The victim is Officer Kent Milner.

Many of the "sick" detectives return to work, in order to investigate the murder of one of their own. Monk looks in Milner's car, and sees that Milner was looking at new homes in Marin County and Hawaii travel brochures, like he had money to spend. Milner was at the lowest paying rank in the department.

Monk arrests Madam Frost for the murders of Allegra Doucet, John Yamada, Diane Truby and Scott Eggers. Doucet was taking clients away from Madam Frost. Madam Frost confesses to the murders. Porter puts together a list of possible witnesses to Doucet's murder and finds Tono Busok, who did not come to the police out of fear that his video bootlegging operation would be discovered.

Milner's arrest sheet shows that he arrested Gruber eight months earlier for making an illegal drug buy. Monk concludes that Gruber is the person who killed Officer Milner. Milner, not Gruber, identified the Golden Gate Strangler, but as Milner was a police officer and hence a city employee, he could not collect the reward, so he recruited Gruber to find it on the grounds they would split the money. But Gruber wanted all of the money, so he killed Milner.

Monk and Natalie go to the jail to question Herrin, bribing him with Natalie's left shoe. Monk shows a photo of Officer Milner, and Herrin remembers Milner as the officer who pulled him over for speeding. Herrin accidentally ran a red light and clipped another car in the intersection, but they both walked away like nothing happened. He dented his bumper and broke one of his rear taillights. Then Herrin got pulled over for doing 35 MPH in a 25 MPH zone. Milner saw the shoes and realized that he had just accidentally found the Golden Gate Strangler.

Natalie calls Gruber asking him to meet them at the pier. At the pier, Monk reveals that Herrin only broke his taillight and dented his bumper after he left the park. Stottlemeyer explains that they have a search warrant and are going to test his clothes for gunshot residue that will match the gun that killed Milner. Gruber takes Monk hostage, but when Monk vomits, Gruber is distracted, shot, and arrested. Mayor Smitrovich is humiliated that he rewarded a cop killer, and he caves in to all of the police union's demands in exchange for a cover up in the press, claiming he knew Gruber was guilty all along and was cooperating with the police in a sting.

The reinstatement of Monk, Wyatt, Chow, and Porter is now void, and they cannot be rehired due to the hiring freeze. Wyatt, Chow, and Porter start up their own detective agency, and tell Monk there will always be a position for him there if he wants it. Natalie tells the other detectives' assistants to keep in touch. Natalie goes to traffic school to burn off her speeding ticket.

== List of characters ==
=== Characters from the television series ===
- Adrian Monk - the titular detective
- Natalie Teeger - Monk's loyal assistant and the narrator of the book
- Captain Leland Stottlemeyer - Captain of the Homicide Division, Monk's oldest friend and former partner
- Lieutenant Randy Disher - Stottlemeyer's right-hand man
- Dr. Charles Kroger - Monk's psychiatrist
- Julie Teeger - Natalie's teenaged daughter

=== Original characters ===
- Officer Susan Curtis - An officer in charge of clerical duties in the homicide division.
- "Mad" Jack Wyatt - A veteran detective who was kicked off of the force after the city lost several lawsuits from his violent and unconventional methods.
- Cynthia "Cindy" Chow - A paranoid schizophrenic who espouses multiple conspiracy theories. Spent most of her time on the force undercover.
- Frank Porter - A senile veteran detective. Spent 45 years on the force, 20 in homicide, during which he worked extensively with Monk. Monk describes him as one of the best investigators he has met.
- Sparrow - Frank Porter's 20-year-old granddaughter, who works as his assistant to manage his senility.
- Arnie - Mad Jack Wyatt's anger management counselor.
- Jasper Perry - Cindy Chow's psychologist.
- Officer Kent Milner - A rookie cop working overtime during the Blue Flu.
- Bertrum Gruber - An informant on the Golden Gate Strangler.
- Charlie Herrin - The Golden Gate Strangler.
- Allegra Doucet - Murder victim and astrologer. Was stabbed to death in her own house.
- John Yamada - Murder victim. Was run down by a car while crossing the street.
- Diane Truby - Murder victim and waitress. Was pushed off the sidewalk and into the path of a bus.
- Scott Eggers - Murder victim. Was bludgeoned and then suffocated in an alley while on the way to his car.
- Max Collins - A client who lost millions of dollars to Allegra Doucet's advice.
- Madam Frost - Allegra Doucet's neighbor and astrology rival.
