= Mr. Monk Gets Even =

2012 novel by Lee Goldberg

- 1st edition 2012 hard cover
- Author: Lee Goldberg
- Language: English
- Series: Monk mystery novel series
- Genre: Mystery novel
- Publisher: Signet Books
- Publication date: December 31, 2012
- Publication place: United States
- Media type: Print (hardcover)
- Preceded by: Mr. Monk is a Mess
- Followed by: Mr. Monk Helps Himself

Mr. Monk Gets Even is the fifteenth novel written by Lee Goldberg to be based on the television series Monk. It was published on December 31, 2012. Like the other novels, the story is narrated by Natalie Teeger, Monk's assistant. It is the final novel of the series to be written by Lee Goldberg.

== Plot summary ==
Natalie Teeger is working as a police officer in New Jersey and her daughter Julie takes her place as Adrian Monk's temporary assistant. Ambrose Monk is about to marry his girlfriend and assistant Yuki Nakamara. Meanwhile, Adrian investigates a series of apparent accidental deaths and suicides, but he suspects they were all murders. After accusing a man of these murders, his nemesis Dale the Whale escapes from prison and Leland Stottlemeyer is under suspicion of helping him escape. Adrian Monk is then assigned to put his private life in order and find out the truth behind the series of murders and Dale's escape.

== Mr. Monk Sees the Light ==
Mr. Monk Sees the Light is an excerpt from Mr. Monk Gets Even that was published as a short story in the December 2012 issue of Ellery Queen's Mystery Magazine before the release of the book.

== List of characters ==
=== Characters from the television series ===
- Adrian Monk: The titular detective, played in the series by Tony Shalhoub
- Natalie Teeger: Monk's loyal assistant and the narrator of the book, played in the series by Traylor Howard
- Ambrose Monk: Adrian Monk's brother, played in the series by John Turturro
- Randy Disher: The acting mayor of Summit, New Jersey, played in the series by Jason Gray-Stanford
- Leland Stottlemeyer: Homicide Captain on the San Francisco Police force, played in the series by Ted Levine
- Dale "The Whale" Biederbeck: One of Adrian Monk's biggest enemies, played in the series by Adam Arkin, Tim Curry and Ray Porter.
- Julie Teeger: Natalie Teeger's daughter and Adrian Monk's temporary assistant, played in the series by Emmy Clarke.

=== Original characters ===
- Amy Devlin: A lieutenant who is Stottlemeyer's right hand in the San Francisco Police Department
- Yuki Nakamara: Assistant to Dub Clemens until his death, now is the assistant and girlfriend of Ambrose Monk
- Ellen Morse: The owner of a shop in Summit, New Jersey that sells items made with sanitized excrement. Despite her profession, Adrian develops a relationship with her based on her love of symmetry and sanitization
