= Mr. Monk Takes Manhattan =

- Monk episode
- The cast stands in Manhattan.
- Episode no.: Season 3 Episode 1
- Directed by: Randall Zisk
- Written by: Andy Breckman
- Production code: #T-2101
- Original air date: June 18, 2004

Guest appearances
- Frank Collison as Warrick Tennyson; Mykelti Williamson as Captain Walter Cage; Jeffrey Dean Morgan as Steven Leight; Olek Krupa as Elmer Gratnik

Episode chronology
← Previous "Mr. Monk Goes to Jail"	Next → "Mr. Monk and the Panic Room"
- Monk (season 3)

"Mr. Monk Takes Manhattan" is the first episode of the third season of the American comedy drama detective television series Monk, and the show's 30th episode overall. The series follows Adrian Monk (Tony Shalhoub), a private detective with obsessive–compulsive disorder and multiple phobias, and his assistant Sharona Fleming (Bitty Schram). In this episode, Monk travels to New York City in an attempt to discover his wife's killer, but may solve the case of the death of the Latvian ambassador.

Written by Andy Breckman and directed by Randall Zisk, "Mr. Monk Takes Manhattan" was shot in New York. When the episode first aired in the United States on USA Network on June 18, 2004, it was watched by 5.5 million viewers. The episode garnered a mixed reaction from critics, praising the comedy obtained through putting Monk in a scenario that would arouse his fears while criticizing Monk's exaggerated reactions to the setting.

== Plot ==
Accompanied by his nurse Sharona Fleming (Bitty Schram) and police officers Captain Stottlemeyer (Ted Levine) and Lieutenant Disher (Jason Gray-Stanford), detective Adrian Monk (Tony Shalhoub) flies to New York City to find criminal Warrick Tennyson (Frank Collison), who criminal Dale "The Whale" Biederbeck (Tim Curry) told Monk was involved in the murder of Monk's wife, Trudy. They stay at the same hotel as the Latvian ambassador, who is subsequently discovered shot to death along with his two bodyguards. Police Captain Walter Cage (Mykelti Williamson) asks for Monk's help in solving the murder. Monk notices the ambassador's coat is damp, even though it had been dry minutes before the murder.

Four policemen retrace the ambassador's movements that day, discovering that he stopped at a bar before arriving at the hotel. Then, Stottlemeyer and Disher go back to the precinct to try to get a bead on Tennyson's location while Monk and Sharona discover that the ambassador's final words meant "This is not my coat." Stottlemeyer breaks into Cage's office to discover that Tennyson is dying in a hospital and has days left to live. Stottlemeyer confronts Cage, who says the only way he will allow access to Tennyson is if Monk solves the ambassador's murder.

Monk is briefly separated from the group after accidentally boarding the wrong train at Hoyt–Schermerhorn Streets. While reuniting with his partners he notices Steven Leight (Jeffrey Dean Morgan) being interviewed on a TV screen in Times Square about the recent murder of his wife. Noticing Leight eating a mint from the same bar the ambassador had last been seen, Monk insists Steven Leight is the ambassador's murderer, despite the lack of supporting evidence. Monk proposes that Leight stole his wife's jewelry to stage a robbery, then proceeded to the bar before calling the police. He asserts Leight and the ambassador were wearing essentially identical coats, and that they must have been switched accidentally at the bar. As rain fell, Leight located the ambassador's hotel room, killed both him and his bodyguards, and switched the newly wet coat with his own.

A ballistics report confirms that Leight's wife and the ambassador were killed with the same gun and Leight is arrested. Having solved the case, Monk is allowed to visit Tennyson who remembers being hired by a man who had six fingers on his right hand. Tennyson asks for forgiveness. Monk derides the request and turns off Tennyson's morphine drip saying, "This is me, turning off your morphine;" but a few moments later, he says, "This is Trudy, the woman you killed, turning it back on," and does.

Monk, Sharona, Stottlemeyer, and Disher leave New York, having gotten a step further in solving Monk's most important case.

== Production ==
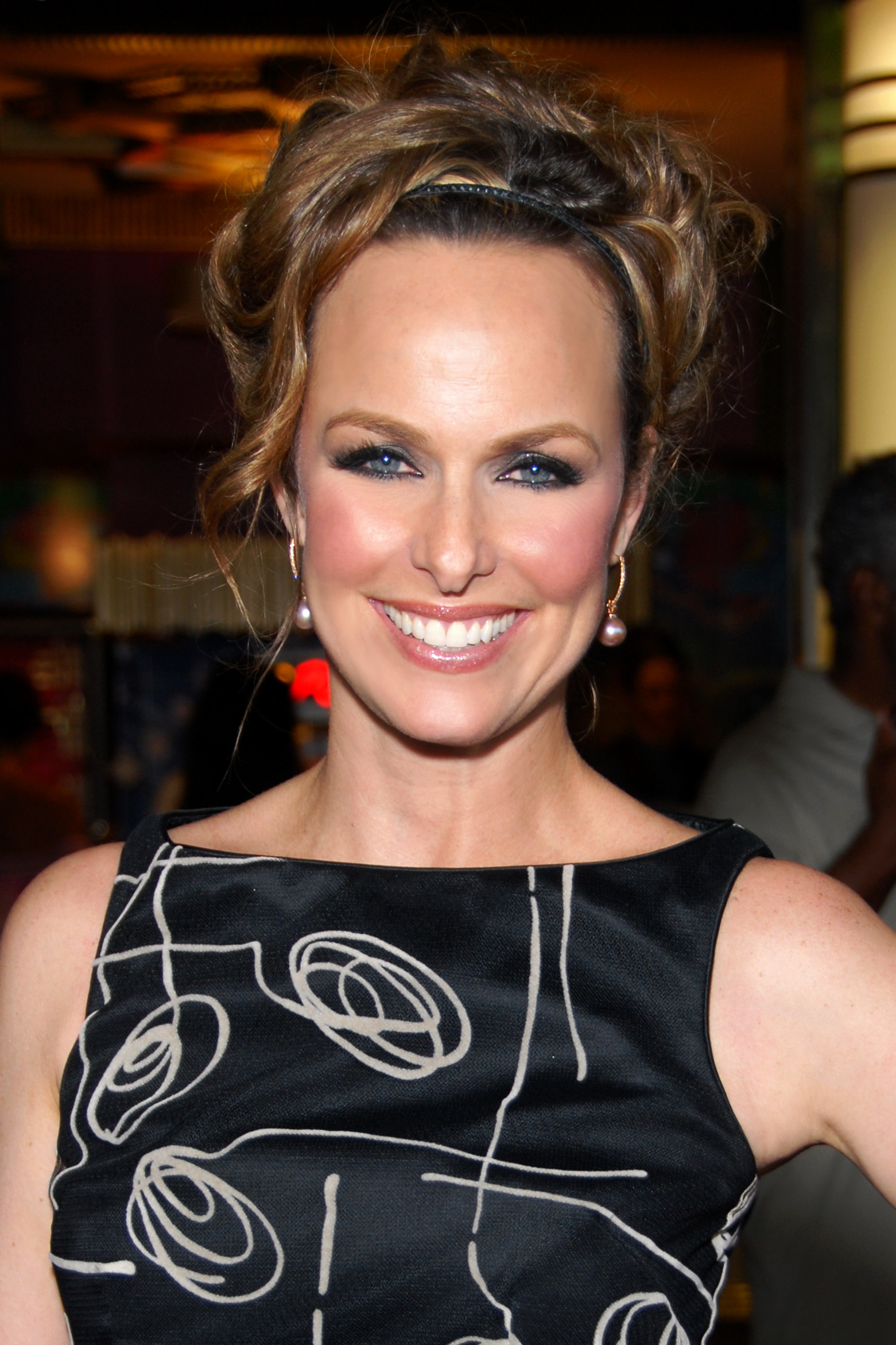
Although the character did not appear in the episode, Trudy (played in flashbacks by Melora Hardin from the third season) is a driving element of Monk that producers tried to explore in this episode.

"Mr. Monk Takes Manhattan" was written by Andy Breckman and directed by Randall Zisk. Series creator and executive producer Breckman was credited for the script for the fifth time in the series, while it was the sixth time Zisk worked on a Monk episode. While Monk's second season was entirely filmed and produced in Los Angeles, "Mr. Monk Takes Manhattan" was shot in New York City in March 2004.

In the series' plot, Trudy was killed years prior to its first episode, which led Monk to develop obsessive–compulsive disorder and to be discharged from the San Francisco Police Department. At the beginning of the third season, executive producer and co-creator David Hoberman said the staff felt it was a good idea to explore Trudy's death. They were, however, careful about the manner in which they mentioned her death and Monk's desire to find the culprit. This was out of concern that they would "burden" the series with it.

== Reception ==
"Mr. Monk Takes Manhattan" was first broadcast in the United States on the USA Network at 9 pm EST on June 18, 2004. According to Nielsen Media Research, the episode was viewed by an estimated number of 5.9 million viewers. It was the third most watched program on cable television that week with a 3.6 percent household rating and a household audience of 3.9 million.

The scenario has been praised for exploring Monk's phobias. CurrentFilm.com and MovieFreak.com's Dennis Landmann qualified it as one of the best episodes of the season. Seattle Post-Intelligencer's Melanie McFarland said although it is "a fecund opportunity for cheap laughs", Shalhoub was able to keep the "balance between Monk's power and helplessness without caving into lower comedic impulses." McFarland praised its writing and Shalhoub, saying "It would begin to look like shoddy choreography" if they were not good. "A welcome return" was how it was described by Robert Lloyd from the Los Angeles Times, who asserted its "pleasures are all in the predictable eccentricities of its characters, and the fact that it's clearly being staged for our benefit." Ted Cox of the Chicago-area Daily Herald praised the scene when Monk forgives Tennyson dubbing it "great TV." Chris Hicks of Deseret News deemed it "a terrific example of how the writers come up with simple situations that throw Monk into turmoil but also allow us to identify with him: Monk in Manhattan. The crowds, the noise, the confusion. Perfect."

Not all reviews were positive. David Bianculli, writing in the New York Daily News, stated that the idea of putting Monk in New York "sound[ed] great" on paper but it did not take advantage of what could be "a delightful study in contrasts." Bianculli called it a "misstep", criticizing its premise and how it was not able to keep the balance between comedy and drama that made it "too outrageous." A review for The Beaver County Times considered it a "stunt episode" and its humor "uncharacteristically forced", saying it "really doesn't do justice to the show's considerable charms." Steve Johnson of the Chicago Tribune affirmed that while the premise is funny, "the writers go out of their way to play the city against his condition." He said it "wouldn't be so bad" if he went to solve crimes "but Friday's first case is a real stretch." Although excited for the episode's premise prior to its broadcast, Austin Smith of the New York Post was very critical of it. Smith said in this episode "the producers have [Monk] crossing that fine line between genius and insanity, transforming our hero into a full-blown mental patient." He also criticized the "Mr. Monk vs. the City of New York" scenes as they do not further the episode's plot. Smith's co-worker, Linda Stasi also panned the episode, considering Monk's reactions "caricature[d]". Stasi wrote, "It's one thing to be an obsessive/compulsive ex-detective who lines up the pins on the murder map and it's another to act like you've got a pin in your brain." As did Smith, Kay McFadden of The Seattle Times called the jokes "predictable" and said, "If you aren't a Monk fan, these devices may strike you as altogether shopworn."
