= List of Monk characters =

Fictional-character list

The following is a list of characters from Monk, an American comedy-drama detective television series created by Andy Breckman and starring Tony Shalhoub as Adrian Monk. Monk's assistant Sharona Fleming, portrayed by Bitty Schram, was replaced by Natalie Teeger, portrayed by Traylor Howard, halfway through the third season. The rest of the principal cast remained consistent throughout the series.

Adrian Monk is the only character to appear in all 125 episodes.

== Main characters ==
Name	Portrayed by	Occupation/Status	Seasons								Film
Name	Portrayed by	Occupation/Status	1	2	3	4	5	6	7	8	Film
Adrian Monk	Tony Shalhoub	Private detective	Main								
Sharona Fleming	Bitty Schram	Adrian Monk's personal nurse and assistant	Main							Guest	
Randall "Randy" Disher	Jason Gray-Stanford	SFPD lieutenant	Main								
Leland Stottlemeyer	Ted Levine	SFPD captain	Main								
Natalie Teeger	Traylor Howard	Adrian Monk's personal assistant			Main						

=== Sharona Fleming ===
Sharona Fleming
- Monk character
- First appearance: "Mr. Monk and the Candidate"
- Created by: Andy Breckman
- Portrayed by: Bitty Schram

Sharona Fleming, portrayed by Bitty Schram, is Adrian Monk's nurse and his assistant during the first three seasons.

Monk was in a catatonic state for three and a half years until Sharona began taking care of him. Monk was able to resume detective work and remarked, "When she found me, I was drowning. She saved my life." The series started a while after she took the assistant's job, and just how she got it and what their early relationship was are never explained, although it is revealed that Captain Stottlemeyer originally engaged her as a nurse for Monk.

It is revealed in the novel Mr. Monk is on Patrol that one of the criteria that the SFPD had for employing Monk as a consultant was that he had to have Sharona with him, in case he has a breakdown. Sharona helps out, sometimes doing independent investigations and sometimes even using her sex appeal to get information that Monk cannot. She also does all kinds of things that Monk's OCD and phobias prevent him from doing as she has few such reservations herself. However, in the season 2 episode "Mr. Monk Goes to the Circus," Sharona is revealed to have a fear of elephants, due to seeing a girl falling into an elephant pit when she was seven years old. She takes up smoking after Monk reacts insensitively to her fear of elephants, telling her to "suck it up".

Sharona drives a tan 1990 Volvo 740 GLE Wagon, which in "Mr. Monk and the 12th Man" is shown to have 100,000 miles. The counter says 99,999, prompting Monk to move the car forwards and backwards until the number is even while staking out Henry Small's house.

She has 'quit' her job as Monk's assistant at least twice; in the episode "Mr. Monk and the Candidate" and "Mr. Monk and the Billionaire Mugger" (this was due to a pay dispute (her paychecks had bounced regularly); she temporarily got a job at a lamp store). Sharona's 'quitting' became a running gag in the show, until she finally left in 2004 to remarry her ex-husband, Trevor Howe, following "Mr. Monk Takes His Medicine". This was because Bitty Schram quit the show over contract disputes. Subsequently, Traylor Howard was introduced as Natalie Teeger, Monk's new assistant, beginning in "Mr. Monk and the Red Herring".

Sharona is mentioned again after her character left the show in "Mr. Monk Is On the Run (Part Two)", having sent flowers for the "deceased" Monk and flying in with Benjy to attend his funeral.

Sharona made a special guest appearance in "Mr. Monk and Sharona", in season 8, in order to meet her lawyer about a lawsuit involving her uncle, Howard Fleming. In this episode she explained what she had been doing since she left. She meets Natalie Teeger, Monk's new assistant, and it seems that they are going to get along until it is revealed that Monk paid Sharona $20 a week more than Natalie. Later, they begin to bicker about assisting styles, the settlement money, etc., The two women later reconcile their differences and note that each woman was just what Monk needed at the time they worked for him, and that Sharona's seeming toughness got Monk to a place where he didn't need a full-time nurse at his side. There was also a surprise hug between Monk and Sharona, which shows the first time Monk has returned a hug given by anyone, and also a surprise kiss between Sharona and Randy Disher, with whom she regularly traded teasing barbs and banter in the first seasons.

In "Mr. Monk and the End", it is revealed that Randy spent two weeks on vacation, having landed in New Jersey (where Sharona lives), and that he and Sharona had found a home which they would share when Randy moves to New Jersey sometime after Monk's last case.

=== Natalie Teeger ===
Natalie Teeger
- Monk character
- A production still of Traylor Howard as Natalie Teeger in "Mr. Monk and the Class Reunion"
- First appearance: "Mr. Monk and the Red Herring"
- Created by: Andy Breckman
- Portrayed by: Traylor Howard

In-universe information
- Full name: Natalie Jane Teeger-Albright
- Gender: Female
- Occupation: Real estate agent Personal assistant Lottery ball girl Bartender; Housesitter; Office worker Blackjack dealer
- Family: Robert Davenport (father); Peggy Davenport (mother); Jonathan Davenport (brother); Neville Davenport (grandfather)
- Spouses: Steven Albright Mitch Teeger (m. 1991; died 1998)
- Children: Julie Teeger (daughter)

Natalie Jane Teeger (née Davenport), portrayed by Traylor Howard, is Adrian Monk's personal assistant from the third season onwards. Howard had not yet seen the show when urged by her manager to audition for the role. Series creator Andy Breckman has stated: "I will always be grateful to Traylor because she came in when the show was in crisis and saved our baby [....] We had to make a hurried replacement, and not every show survives that. I was scared to death."

Natalie was born into the wealthy Davenport family, the owners of the successful Davenport Toothpaste company. She was a nudist during her time as an exchange student in Greece when she was nineteen years old, and she worked as a blackjack dealer in Las Vegas for two years. Natalie became estranged from her family when she married Lieutenant Commander Mitch Teeger, whom her parents disapproved of, though they would later reconcile. Following Mitch's death in 1998 in the Kosovo War, Natalie was left as the single mother of their daughter, Julie, and bounced around between a number of odd jobs, including working in an office, housesitting, and bartending.

After two intruders break into her house within the same week – one of whom she kills in self-defense – Natalie convinces Monk, who is still reeling from Sharona's departure, to take her case. Monk takes a liking to Natalie during their investigation and offers her Sharona's position as his assistant. Though she initially refuses, Natalie changes her mind, quits her job as a bartender, and accepts Monk's offer after witnessing his kindness to Julie.

Natalie proves more deferential and patient with her boss than Sharona was, often referring to him as "Mr. Monk". She is not hesitant to call him out when she feels he is being unfair or unreasonable, however, as she is at first frustrated by Monk's apparent selfishness and his refusal to pay her expenses. It is only after Monk risks his own well-being to save Natalie that the two begin to grow closer and bond over the loss of their spouses.

Natalie soon becomes an extremely devoted friend to Monk and develops a strong faith in his observational abilities. There have been several occasions where she is the only one to support her boss' theories. She is also shown to be rather cunning, and is often able to trick people into doing things that help her and Monk with their investigations.

Towards the end of the series, Natalie begins dating Mitch's oldest friend in the navy, Lieutenant Steven Albright, as Julie leaves home to study theatre arts at UC Berkeley. As of the follow-up film Mr. Monk's Last Case: A Monk Movie, Natalie has married Steven and works as a real estate agent in Atlanta, Georgia, having moved there to be closer to Julie.

=== Captain Leland Stottlemeyer ===
Leland Stottlemeyer
- Monk character
- A production still of Ted Levine from "Mr. Monk and the Red Herring"
- First appearance: "Mr. Monk and the Candidate"
- Created by: David Hoberman
- Portrayed by: Ted Levine

In-universe information
- Gender: Male
- Title: Captain
- Occupation: SFPD Detective - Robbery & Homicide Division
- Family: Hamish Stottlemeyer (father); Unnamed mother Mark Stottlemeyer (brother); Unnamed sister
- Spouses: Trudy "T.K." Stottlemeyer (née Jensen) (wife); Karen Stottlemeyer (ex-wife, divorced in "Mr. Monk and the Captain's Marriage")
- Children: Jared Stottlemeyer (son, with Karen); Max Stottlemeyer (son, with Karen)
- Relatives: Unnamed aunt

Captain Leland Francis Stottlemeyer, portrayed by Ted Levine, is a captain of the San Francisco Police Department (SFPD)'s homicide detail. He is a longtime and long-suffering friend of main protagonist Adrian Monk from their days on the force together, when Stottlemeyer served as Monk's fourth partner and later as watch commander. Stottlemeyer's second-in-command, Lieutenant Randy Disher, is a source of much comedic strife. In the tradition of superior officers in detective television shows, Stottlemeyer often punctuates comedic moments by shouting the protagonist's last name in an annoyed tone.

Not much is known of Stottlemeyer's life before he joined the SFPD in the series, though in an interview, Ted Levine stated it was his own belief that Stottlemeyer had served in the military and was later discharged, lived on the East Coast, then moved to California as a young man, joining the police force. In "Mr. Monk and the Class Reunion", it is implied that he has lived in the Bay Area since at least the 1970s; when he is trying to get information from reunion guests about a homicide investigation, he is booed off the stage when the projectionist displays some embarrassing pictures of him wearing riot gear and attacking protesters at an anti-nuclear warfare demonstration at UC Berkeley. In S05E13, "Mr. Monk is on the Air," Captain Stottelmeyer has multiple pictures of helicopters on the wall of his office, as well as a picture of a F-22 Raptor (likely a souvenir from S04E14, "Mr. Monk and the Astronaut"). Such keepsakes are common among former service members. Incidentally there is a print on his office wall of a number of helicopters, but these are U.K. Royal Naval helicopters.

In "Mr. Monk Makes the Playoffs", it is mentioned that he has not lived in Los Angeles for almost 30 years. The novel Mr. Monk and the New Lieutenant reveals that Stottlemeyer's father was a bartender named Hamish. Stottlemeyer mentions in "Mr. Monk Gets Cabin Fever" that he was the youngest officer in the history of the SFPD to make detective, giving him at least a few years of seniority on Monk. As Stottlemeyer mentions in "Mr. Monk Goes to the Carnival", when Monk was promoted to detective, he was partnered with Stottlemeyer and right away showed off his amazing abilities when he proved that a prostitute's apparent suicide was murder. It is mentioned in "Mr. Monk Takes His Medicine" that Stottlemeyer was Monk's fourth partner on the force, and this came two weeks after Monk made detective (Monk says that his first three partners were good enough guys but that their professional chemistry did not work).

Stottlemeyer was later promoted past Monk. At the time Trudy was murdered, Stottlemeyer reluctantly suspended Monk from duty, though the two remained friends. Stottlemeyer also looked up Sharona Fleming and hired her as Monk's practical nurse, which helped Monk to recover from a state of near-catatonia caused by Trudy's death.

The two men have a deep respect for one another, as evidenced by Monk's description of Stottlemeyer as "the best cop I know" and Stottlemeyer's comment that Monk is "the best detective in the free world".

Especially in the early episodes of the show, there is a certain degree of tension between Stottlemeyer and Monk. Stottlemeyer resents being forced (frequently by the higher-up characters, such as the mayor, the chiefs, or the commissioner) into calling on Monk's assistance, and he is frequently exasperated by Monk's many quirks. Also inherent in this hostility is a certain degree of jealousy; Stottlemeyer appears only too aware that he is not nearly the detective that Monk is. In the novel Mr. Monk and the Dirty Cop, he starts to feel a little hostile towards Monk after taking a lot of ribbing from Paul Braddock (and at one time, Braddock actually insults Stottlemeyer, accusing him of using Monk as a metaphorical crutch). As a result, later in the story, upon learning that Monk's consultancy contract has been ripped up, Sharona takes her anger out on Stottlemeyer, accusing him of using the latest round of budget cuts as an excuse to cut Monk (and her) loose as a result of Braddock attacking his abilities.

Stottlemeyer is also skeptical of Monk's ability to perform as a police officer, aware that Monk's psychological problems are a very serious handicap; in "Mr. Monk Goes to the Carnival", he reveals his misgivings about allowing Monk back into the police department to the panel evaluating Monk's request.

Despite these tensions, however, Stottlemeyer also has a great deal of sympathy and respect for Monk; even Stottlemeyer cannot deny Monk's abilities. Once convinced of the validity of one of Monk's theories, Stottlemeyer always proves a staunch ally in apprehending Monk's primary suspects. A turning point for the character came in the second-season episode "Mr. Monk and the Captain's Wife", when Stottlemeyer's own wife Karen is seriously injured in a car accident and put in a coma. Though she recovers, Stottlemeyer is left with a taste of the kind of pain Monk bears from Trudy and becomes far more sympathetic and respectful to him, if still exasperated by Monk's more extreme idiosyncrasies.

In "Mr. Monk Makes a Friend", Monk apparently makes a friend out of Hal Tucker, who is revealed later to have just been using him, and even calls out Stottlemeyer, Disher and Natalie for not being Monk's friends and just using him for his abilities. Later in the same episode Stottlemeyer saves him, identifying Monk as his friend when he stops Hal which makes Monk beam with happiness.

In "Mr. Monk Takes Manhattan", Stottlemyer goes with Monk to New York City to follow up on a lead on Trudy's murder, and harshly confronts New York City police captain Walter Cage for concealing information about Warrick Tennyson that is essential to Monk to solving the murder, remarking that that was the only thing he cared about at the time. In "Mr. Monk Is On the Run", when Monk is framed for murder by corrupt sheriff John Rollins, Stottlemeyer proves his loyalty to Monk by helping him fake his own death, risking his own career and freedom.

Stottlemeyer's attitude toward Randy Disher, his immediate subordinate in the SFPD frequently shifts between amused tolerance and frustration. He puts up with Disher's idiosyncrasies and even barely resists laughing at some of his outlandish theories and quirks. At times, Stottlemeyer prefers to discuss an ongoing case with Monk instead of Disher, such as when the lieutenant complains vociferously about a toothache in "Mr. Monk Goes to the Dentist." However, Stottlemeyer appreciates Disher's abilities and even harbors a degree of affection for him, especially in situations of personal peril. When Disher loses heavily at the blackjack tables in "Mr. Monk Goes to Vegas," Stottlemeyer persuades Monk to help win the money back; later, in "Mr. Monk Gets Lotto Fever," he offers to pay off Disher's student loans after believing he has won the lottery.

According to the show's timeline, Leland married Karen Junara in 1985. They were married for twenty years. Leland states that they have known each other since their childhood in "Mr. Monk and the Captain's Wife". They have two sons, Jared and Max.

Leland and Karen have recurring marital problems and have separated twice. In "Mr. Monk and the Captain's Marriage," Monk explains to Natalie that the couple has practically nothing in common (case in point: he recalls one weekend when Leland went on a hunting trip, while Karen stayed behind to organize a rally for stronger gun control).

In the season 8 episode "Mr. Monk Is the Best Man," it is mentioned that Karen was Leland's second wife, and he was married once before, but that marriage was annulled after only five days.

In the final season, Stottlemeyer meets and starts dating journalist Trudy Jensen who is normally called "T.K", beginning in the episode "Happy Birthday, Mr. Monk". While Stottlemeyer is initially concerned that Trudy's name would upset Monk, Monk is enthused, saying that everyone should have a Trudy in their life. When Sharona sees T.K.'s picture in Stottlemeyer's office in the season 8 episode "Mr. Monk and Sharona", she says Stottlemeyer must feel like he won the lottery, and he heartily agrees.

In the episode "Mr. Monk Is the Best Man", Leland marries T.K. However, as the days count down until their wedding, someone starts making threats against Leland and T.K., including ransacking his house, blowing up his car, making threatening phone calls to T.K., and setting off a bomb at the wedding rehearsal. Monk eventually finds out that these acts were the work of T.K.'s friend and maid of honor, Stephanie Briggs, who was trying to recover a gun she had used earlier that week to kill fellow ecoterrorist Martin Kettering.

=== Lieutenant Randy Disher ===
Randall Disher
- Monk character
- First appearance: "Mr. Monk and the Candidate"
- Created by: David Hoberman
- Portrayed by: Jason Gray-Stanford

In-universe information
- Gender: Male
- Occupation: Philadelphia Police Department, Police Sergeant (pre-1999); San Francisco Police Department, Police Lieutenant (1999-2009); Summit, New Jersey Chief of Police (2009)
- Family: Maria Disher (mother)
- Significant other: Sharona Fleming
- Relatives: Harvey Disher (uncle; deceased as of "Mr. Monk Visits a Farm")

Randall Disher, portrayed by Jason Gray-Stanford, is Captain Stottlemeyer's second-in-command and employed at the SFPD. He is usually portrayed as loyal and tenacious but with a comical lack of insight and given to far-fetched theories, which are a running gag of the series. Aside from his ridiculous theories, which often defy the laws of physics (for instance, astral projection), he is competent within his own range of abilities.

Another running gag in the series is the ceremonial way in which he delivers news to Stottlemeyer, asking him to guess what it is or sit down for it; this method mostly annoys others who would like him to get to the point. His feelings towards Monk change from the pilot episode of the series. In the pilot, Disher is not only skeptical of Monk but also seems to regard him as a joke, even calling him "the defective detective" while talking to Stottlemeyer. This cynicism transforms into admiration as their relationship develops.

The novel Mr. Monk and the Blue Flu offers an explanation for the apparent contradiction between Disher's seeming ineptitude at solving cases and his continuing role as a ranked police officer: Stottlemeyer, in a covert meeting with Monk and Natalie, states that Disher in fact has a high clearance and conviction rate; the cases he solves are simply not high-profile or unusual enough to be mentioned in the press (or covered in a Monk adventure). He explains that Disher is able to solve so many cases because he is a "people person" who gets people to say things they would not have said otherwise.

The character's last name was Deacon in the pilot episode, as part of the creators' homage to the character of Inspector Lestrade, a police officer in the Sherlock Holmes mysteries (LEland STottlemeyer and RAndy DEacon). It was changed to Disher for the remainder of the series.

Disher seems to harbor crushes on Sharona Fleming and Natalie. He writes a personal ad fitting Sharona in the episode "Mr. Monk and the Paperboy", which he unsuccessfully tries to hide from her. In the season 6 episode "Mr. Monk and the Bad Girlfriend", when Natalie tells Disher that she and Monk have news, he guesses that she wants to say she is in love with him, leaving her in a dumbstruck and annoyed state.

His lack of luck getting dates is so notorious that when he actually does land a girlfriend, in the episode "Mr. Monk and the Employee of the Month", no one believes him. A few episodes later, in "Mr. Monk Gets Cabin Fever", he dates a woman named Hayley, only for her to turn out to be part of a Triad hit crew sent to eliminate Monk.

In the episode "Mr. Monk and Sharona," Disher and Sharona have a fond reunion. While reminiscing over the cases that they have worked, Sharona apologizes to him for the amount of teasing that she gave him; he, in turn, states that he "missed" it. At the end of the episode, he picks up Sharona to go to the airport, sharing a kiss as they load her bags. In the series finale, "Mr. Monk and the End," he accepts a job as Chief of Police in the town of Summit in Sharona's native New Jersey, stating that the two are moving in together.

According to "Mr. Monk and His Biggest Fan", Disher was born in San Diego. He attended Temple University and lived in Philadelphia briefly, where he was a sergeant in that city's police. This is mentioned in the season 4 episode "Mr. Monk Goes to a Wedding". In Philadelphia, one of Disher's cases was Darlene Coolidge, a "black widow" killer who murdered her husbands. In "Mr. Monk Goes to a Wedding", Coolidge attempts to run Disher down in the parking lot of a hotel to prevent him from identifying her.

Although he denied having an uncle in the season 3 episode "Mr. Monk Gets Cabin Fever", in the season 5 episode "Mr. Monk Visits a Farm", he inherits his uncle Harvey's farm after Harvey supposedly commits suicide.

In high school, Disher was part of a rock band, The Randy Disher Project, which he resurrects in the episode "Mr. Monk Goes to the Dentist" after he quits the police force. The band records a song, "I Don't Need a Badge". The band breaks up, and Disher returns to the SFPD shortly afterwards. In the season 5 episode "Mr. Monk and the Really, Really Dead Guy", Disher is placed as a decoy to attract the attention of a serial, playing "I Don't Need a Badge" as a one-man band while forgetting most of the lyrics. In the novel Mr. Monk is Miserable, "I Don't Need a Badge" has become a cult phenomenon in Paris. Paris police Inspector Guy Gadois knows the lyrics and music of the song by heart. The song is also featured in the season 8 episode "Mr. Monk Goes Camping" as the ringtone on Disher's cell phone.

== Secondary characters ==
=== Julie Teeger ===
Julie Teeger
- First appearance: "Mr. Monk and the Red Herring"
- Last appearance: "Mr. Monk and the End - Part I" "Mr. Monk and the End - Part II" (flashback only)
- Portrayed by: Emmy Clarke (2005–2009)

In-universe information
- Gender: Female
- Family: Natalie Teeger (mother); Mitch Teeger (father; deceased)

Julie Teeger (played by Emmy Clarke) is Natalie's teenage daughter. Because Emmy Clarke was attending public school and living on the east coast of the United States during her time working on Monk, Julie's on-screen appearances had to be limited to the occasional episode. Like her mother, Julie is introduced during the season three episode "Mr. Monk and the Red Herring". Julie bonds with Monk after he rescues her pet fish. In that episode, Julie is 11 years old.

Julie plays a key role in the season four episode "Mr. Monk Goes to a Fashion Show", when Julian Hodge (Malcolm McDowell) invites her to participate in his fashion show, despite her young age. Natalie is reluctant at first but then gives in. When Monk discovers that Hodge murdered models Clea Vance and Natasia Zorelle, Natalie forbids her daughter to participate in the show, causing Julie to run away from home to be in the show.

In the season five episode "Mr. Monk and the Really, Really Dead Guy", Julie teaches Monk how to use her computer. When he brings it to the station while the FBI is trying to trace a call from a killer, he plugs it in along with the other computers. In the middle of the meeting, Monk intercepts an email from one of Julie's friends, and responds to it. Wires get crossed, resulting in the SWAT team storming a slumber party of innocent teens, including Julie.

In the season five episode "Mr. Monk and the Big Game", Julie and her friends on the high school basketball team hire Monk to investigate the death of their basketball coach, Lynn Hayden, after she is found electrocuted and killed in the locker room. Natalie temporarily coaches the team with Monk as her assistant.

Julie plays another critical role in season six episode "Mr. Monk and the Birds and the Bees", in which Monk gives her "the talk" after she starts dating Clay Bridges. Clay later reveals that he was paid by Julie's (fictitious) Aunt Karen to go out with her. "Karen" is revealed to be the girlfriend of sports agent Rob Sherman, who killed his wife and career burglar Dewey Jordan in a staged break-in. He has his girlfriend pose as Julie's aunt because he saw a T-shirt with a photo of Julie and her previous boyfriend Tim Sussman, in which he and Dewey converse in the background. The episode gives Julie an integral role.

In the season six episode "Mr. Monk and the Three Julies", Julie receives her driver's license. After two other women with the name Julie Teeger are killed, Natalie's Julie becomes the only person with this name within 1,000 miles. In the same episode, it is revealed that Julie was named after Mitch's aunt, who was one of the first female war correspondents in Vietnam.

Julie is seventeen years old by the time of the season seven episode "Mr. Monk Is Underwater". Trying to become an actress during the season eight episode "Mr. Monk and the Critic", Julie's beautiful voice is the key to proving that theater critic John Hannigan snuck out and killed his girlfriend Callie Esterhaus during a theater performance.

In "Mr. Monk and the End, Part One", Julie moves away from home to enter the University of California at Berkeley to study theatre arts. In real life, Emmy Clarke studied communication and media studies at Fordham University.

==== Novels ====
During the first few novels, Julie's role is minimal, but she occasionally, knowingly or not, gives Monk crucial information that is key to solving a murder case. In Mr. Monk Goes to the Firehouse, when a firehouse dog named Sparky is murdered, Julie hires Monk to investigate pro bono. In Mr. Monk and the Blue Flu, Julie's attention to brands and fashion designs gives Monk a crucial clue to the Golden Gate Strangler's profile. In Mr. Monk and the Two Assistants, Julie breaks her wrist during a soccer game and subsequently spends most of the novel with her arm in a cast. She pays to have a local pizzeria called Sorrento's advertise on it. The advertising on her cast is a clue Monk utilizes to prove that mystery writer Ian Ludlow killed a local shoe salesman and tried to frame Natalie for it.

In the novel Mr. Monk Gets Even, Julie becomes a principal character, as she temporarily becomes Monk's assistant while Natalie is temporarily serving on the police force in Summit, New Jersey. She strikes up an unusual friendship with Randy's replacement in the SFPD, Lieutenant Amy Devlin. Over the first half of the story, Julie's behavior assisting Monk is different from Natalie's when it comes to helping him focus. For instance, when Monk finds himself unable to go up to the apartment of a man who fell off his balcony, Julie solves the situation by using her iPad and FaceTime while having Devlin use the application to give Monk a virtual tour of the apartment. She helps Monk investigate a series of murders that are made to look like accidents, which Monk ties to computer magnate Cleve Dobbs. Julie also initially helps Monk out when Dale "the Whale" Biederbeck apparently escapes from police custody while at SF General Hospital undergoing a bypass surgery. She accompanies Monk and Stottlemeyer to question Dale's girlfriend Stella Chaze, but considers quitting the job after Stella attempts to kill the three by suicide-bombing her house. She confides her troubles to Natalie, who, guilt-ridden, immediately catches the first flight home to San Francisco.

When Stottlemeyer is later suspended on suspicion of helping Dale escape (due to offshore money being wired into his account within hours of his escape), Julie grows a dislike of SFPD deputy chief Harlan Fellows, the one ordering Stottlemeyer's suspension. Whereas Devlin wills herself to tolerate Fellows getting on their backs, Julie doubts that Fellows is even qualified for the job, believing that no deputy chief could be so thick-headed as to immediately suspect that Stottlemeyer is on the take despite all the evidence to the contrary without being very incompetent. Julie begins researching information on Fellows after Natalie returns to San Francisco to re-take her position as Monk's assistant. In the end, after Monk captures Dale, Julie discovers that Fellows never had a criminology degree at all, and his whole career is based on a lie. Stottlemeyer uses this as his leverage to get Fellows to resign and erase his own suspension from the record book.

=== Charles Kroger ===
Dr. Charles Kroger
- First appearance: "Mr. Monk and the Candidate (Part One)"
- Last appearance: "Mr. Monk Paints His Masterpiece"
- Portrayed by: Stanley Kamel (2002–2008)

In-universe information
- Occupation: Psychiatrist
- Spouse: Alicia Madeline Kroger
- Children: Troy Kroger

Dr. Charles Kroger (played by Stanley Kamel) is Monk's psychiatrist for the first six seasons.

Dr. Kroger serves as a critical pillar of emotional support for Monk. While he engages in routine talk therapy, he does not prescribe medication, since Monk reacts badly whenever he takes medicine. In "Mr. Monk Takes His Medicine", Dr. Kroger prescribes "Dioxynl", which successfully relieves Monk's phobias while also impairing his detective skills.

Dr. Kroger is instrumental in trying to get Monk reinstated as a detective, all while discussing his problems and progress as a person. In the novel Mr. Monk and the Blue Flu, Natalie describes Dr. Kroger as relaxed towards everything, to an unnatural extent.

Most of Dr. Kroger's scenes help move Monk's character forward. Similarly, Dr. Kroger also (usually unintentionally) helps Monk find something that solves his current case.

In the season five episode "Mr. Monk Gets a New Shrink", Dr. Kroger finds his cleaning lady Teresa Mueller stabbed and killed in his office. He retires out of guilt as the police believe that one of his patients is responsible. However, Monk discovers that the cleaning lady was killed by drug trafficker Francis Merrigan, another tenant in Dr. Kroger's building.

Dr. Kroger is the subject of an ongoing feud between Monk and Harold Krenshaw, a patient with similar problems. While very forgiving, even he gets fed up with Monk from time to time, most heavily demonstrated in "Mr. Monk and the Sleeping Suspect", when Dr. Kroger returns from vacationing in Costa Rica and sees Monk standing outside his home. Dr. Kroger instructs the cab driver to keep driving and keeps his head low to avoid Monk. In "Mr. Monk and the Garbage Strike", when the city stops collecting garbage, Monk mails his garbage to Dr. Kroger's house.

In several cases, the doctor is the only person capable of getting through to Monk during difficult situations, such as when Monk is brainwashed by Ralph Roberts in the season six episode "Mr. Monk Joins a Cult".

It is revealed in the season three episode "Mr. Monk and the Election" that Dr. Kroger is married, had a first wife, has children, and is Jewish. In the first episode of season five, "Mr. Monk and the Actor", Monk wants to take up the entire week with therapy, but Dr. Kroger says he does not like working on the weekends so he can spend time with family. In "Mr. Monk Gets a New Shrink", it is revealed that he has a wife, Madeline, and a rebellious adolescent son, Troy, who denies that he is their child, has made his father take a DNA test three times, and has been detained by Randy on a previous occasion. When Randy asks Troy if he is staying out of trouble, Troy says no.

In April 2008, Stanley Kamel died of a heart attack during a production hiatus between seasons 6 and 7. Rather than recast the role, the writers wrote Dr. Kroger out of the show by having him also die of a heart attack, and cast Héctor Elizondo in the replacement role of Dr. Neven Bell, who is a friend and colleague of Dr. Kroger's, and as such, can sympathize with Monk's feeling of loss. The end credits to the first episode aired after Kamel's death, "Mr. Monk Buys a House", begin with a dedication to Kamel's memory.

=== Neven Bell ===
Dr. Neven Bell
- First appearance: "Mr. Monk Buys a House"
- Portrayed by: Héctor Elizondo

In-universe information
- Gender: Male
- Occupation: Therapist

Dr. Neven Bell (portrayed by Héctor Elizondo) becomes Monk's therapist in the season seven premiere "Mr. Monk Buys a House", replacing Dr. Kroger.

Though Monk is initially skeptical, Dr. Bell wins his confidence through several small gestures: he begins the appointment at the exact second it is scheduled, supplies Monk with his current favorite bottled water, "Summit Creek," wipes during their introductory handshake, and displays a painting in his office which previously belonged to the late Dr. Kroger.

Additionally, before the first session, Natalie points out that Dr. Bell's first name is a palindrome as a comfort to Monk. Monk points out that it is not a "perfect" palindrome because the first N is capitalized. Dr. Bell also uses his past baseball experiences when talking with Monk in "Mr. Monk Takes the Stand".

Dr. Bell's character has a considerably constructed background, in sharp contrast to Dr. Kroger. In "Mr. Monk Buys a House", Natalie describes Dr. Bell as a psychiatric genius and mentions that he has written five books and teaches at Stanford University. Later, in "Mr. Monk Gets Lotto Fever", when Monk confides how he loathes Natalie for getting more attention than him, Dr. Bell is forced to admit to being a diva after writing an unsuccessful book on body language. The episode "Mr. Monk Fights City Hall" reveals that Dr. Bell served on the city council in Tulsa, Oklahoma, but he got bored with the job and started sending his secretary as his proxy.

=== Dale "The Whale" Biederbeck ===
Dale J. Biederbeck III
- First appearance: "Mr. Monk Meets Dale the Whale"
- Last appearance: "Mr. Monk Is on the Run (Part Two)"
- Portrayed by: Adam Arkin (2002); Tim Curry (2004); Ray Porter (2008)

In-universe information
- Alias: Dale "The Whale" Biederbeck
- Occupation: Financier

Dale J. Biederbeck III, better known as Dale "The Whale" because of his morbid obesity, his practice of working through both public avenues and the criminal underworld (much as a whale, being an aquatic mammal, must spend time both underwater and above water), and the convenient fact that "whale" rhymes with his first name, is a recurring villain, appearing in three episodes. In the first season, he is played by Adam Arkin, in the second by Tim Curry, and in the sixth by Ray Porter, all of them wearing fat suits.

Dale is a rich and well-connected financier who is arrogant, brilliant, and ruthless. He has a biting and sarcastic personality, often insulting his employees and the police without fear of repercussion. Monk claims that Biederbeck owns "half the city" of San Francisco and has an option on the other half. Biederbeck sued Trudy and her newspaper for libel after her article profiled him as "the Genghis Khan of world finance". Knowing he couldn't win, Biederbeck did everything possible to draw the lawsuit out to torment her. It took over a year to resolve, and the legal costs forced the Monks to sell their first home, which Biederbeck then purchased and used to store his collection of pornography. Monk feels that Biederbeck stole one of the last years of Trudy's life, resulting in him having a hatred of the man.

In "Mr. Monk Meets Dale the Whale", Dr. Christiaan Vezza, Dale's physician, reveals that when Dale moved into his apartment, he weighed 422 pounds (191 kilograms) and could occasionally see his toes. After his mother died, he started bingeing. He topped out at 927 pounds about 11 years before the events of the episode and has been bedridden ever since. In his first and second appearances, he weighs about 800 pounds (363 kilograms) and is unable to leave his bed. By his third appearance in "Mr. Monk Is on the Run (Part Two)", he has lost just enough weight to get around in a wheelchair.

In his first appearance, "Mr. Monk Meets Dale the Whale", Biederbeck is the primary suspect in the slaying of Catherine Lavinio, a superior court judge who issued a costly antitrust ruling against him. Several clues point to him, but his involvement is thought to be impossible because he is incapable of leaving his bedroom. Monk discovers that he ordered Vezza to murder the judge and implicate Biederbeck. "Vezza" is revealed to be Glen Q. Syndell, a doctor who skipped bail on a manslaughter charge for killing a tender-aged patient while intoxicated; Biederbeck discovered this and blackmailed the doctor into his employ.

Biederbeck goes to extreme lengths to avoid publicity, buying newspaper companies just so that they won't print his name. The first twenty numbers on his speed-dial are lawyers.

In the season two finale, "Mr. Monk Goes to Jail", Biederbeck is in prison, implied to be the result of a never-told Monk adventure. He has an inmate as his personal servant, luxurious furniture, and a TV but no cell window. After condemned prisoner Ray Kaspo is poisoned less than an hour before his execution, suspicion falls on Biederbeck, to whom Kaspo owed $1,200. Monk knows that Biederbeck would not kill anyone over such a petty sum. Nevertheless, until the killer is caught, the prison refuses to install a window in Dale's cell. He offers Monk a deal: find the killer and Biederbeck will share what he knows about Trudy's murder. After Monk finds that prison librarian Sylvia Fairborn killed Kaspo, Dale reveals that Trudy was, contrary to Monk's belief, the intended victim of the car bomb. He also states that Monk should look for a man named Warrick Tennyson in Manhattan, New York.

In the two-part episode "Mr. Monk Is on the Run", Monk is framed for the murder of Frank Nunn, the six-fingered man who hired Tennyson. Dale is revealed to be the mastermind of the plot and of a simultaneous plot to assassinate the governor of California, who had previously refused to commute his sentence. The lieutenant governor, who is on Dale's payroll, would then pardon Dale, completing Dale's revenge by going free and returning to his comfortable lifestyle while Monk goes to prison for Nunn's murder. Monk foils Dale's plan, and John Rollins, the LA County sheriff whom Dale recruited to frame Monk, turns state's evidence in the hopes of lightening his own sentence. As a result, all of Dale's privileges are revoked: his furniture, custom bed, telephone, and laptop are confiscated, his window is blocked up, his special meal deliveries and manicure appointments are cancelled, and he is reduced to eating in the prison cafeteria and sleeping in a cramped bunk bed.

==== Novels ====
Biederbeck makes a brief appearance in the 2008 novel Mr. Monk Goes to Germany by Lee Goldberg. Monk telephones Biederbeck from Germany when he suspects that one of Dr. Kroger's colleagues, a psychiatrist with a six-fingered hand named Dr. Martin Rahner, is the man who killed Trudy. Since the doctor was giving a lecture at Berkeley around the same time that Trudy was killed, thanks to a grant from one of Biederbeck's foundations, Monk suspects Rahner of being the killer. Biederbeck smugly refuses to confirm or deny Monk's suspicions, but later Monk proves that the doctor is not Trudy's killer.

Dale plays an important part of the second of two intertwined plotlines in the novel Mr. Monk Gets Even, released in late 2012. Since the events of "Mr. Monk Is on the Run", all of Dale's assets have been tied up in various lawsuits, thus forcing the state of California to front the bill for his medical costs. However, due to the recent fiscal crisis, the state has no money left to pay for Dale's medical treatment. Dale consents to undergo a gastric bypass operation so that he can be integrated into the regular prison system. The day of the operation, Monk, Julie and Stottlemeyer meet the motorcade bringing Dale to San Francisco General Hospital. He is one of three patients operated on that day, the others being men named Frank Cannon and Jason McCabe. Even before the operation, Monk believes Dale will try to use this as an opportunity to escape.

Indeed, the next day, there is a major accident when a moving truck driving down Powell Street loses its brakes, careens down the hill into Union Square, and smashes into a MUNI bus and a cable car, leaving four people dead and dozens critically injured. Observing the rescue efforts from afar, Monk belatedly realizes Dale arranged it and has made his move. Monk, Julie, Stottlemeyer and Devlin rush to the hospital, but in the chaos, it seems Dale has escaped by being snuck out in a body bag by an accomplice driving a stolen hearse.

Eventually, Monk, Julie and Stottlemeyer discover that Dale has a girlfriend, a graphic designer named Stella Chaze. They question Stella at her house, and Monk determines from the fact that she has a Band-Aid on her from an IV injection that she is the accomplice who staged the truck accident. However, any chance of figuring out where Dale is through her ends when she tries to kill the three by suicide-bombing her house (the three survive, though Stottlemeyer breaks his right arm when the resulting fireball throws him through the air and he lands the wrong way).

The next day, in a surprise turn of events, Stottlemeyer is ordered suspended by deputy chief Harlan Fellows after it is revealed that $100,000 from an offshore account was deposited into Stottlemeyer's bank account hours after the escape.

A few days later, Monk, Natalie and Devlin find a dead body floating in the water, apparently ripped up by boat propellers. However, Monk determines that it was a murder and uses the body to solve the case. He concludes that the dead body is actually that of Jason McCabe, one of the other two patients operated on the day Dale's surgery was performed. Stella had staged the truck crash, as Monk suspected, then infiltrated the hospital, but she did not take Dale out of the hospital. Rather, she moved Dale into McCabe's place, killed McCabe, and removed his body from the hospital. Dale's escape did not involve an actual escape but would involve him changing his identity. To make sure this happened, he had set up arrangements so that the doctor who did his surgery was sent away to Hawaii right after the operation, and a new doctor who had never met Dale, McCabe, or Cannon, would oversee his recovery. Also, McCabe was a homeless person, as Monk has deduced from the state of his teeth, whose surgery had been paid for by Dale and represented by Stella Chaze, who had been posing as an outreach person. He was the perfect patsy because Dale needed to switch places with someone who had no family or friends who would visit or miss him.

Sure enough, when Monk and the others go to the hospital and pull back "McCabe's" curtain, they find Dale, who is arrested and stopped, presumably for good now.

=== Benjy Fleming ===
Benjy Fleming
- First appearance: "Mr. Monk and the Candidate"
- Last appearance: "Mr. Monk and the Employee of the Month"
- Portrayed by: Max Morrow (2002); Kane Ritchotte (2002–2004)

In-universe information
- Family: Sharona Fleming (mother); Trevor Howe (father); Douglas Fleming (maternal grandfather; deceased); Cheryl Fleming (maternal grandmother); Gail Fleming (maternal aunt)

Benjamin "Benjy" Fleming is Sharona's son. He is played by Kane Ritchotte in the pilot, season two, and the first half of season three, and by Max Morrow in the rest of season one. It was necessary to have two actors play the role because Ritchotte lives on the West Coast, while the pilot was filmed in Vancouver and seasons two and three in Los Angeles. Morrow lives on the East Coast, where the remainder of season one was filmed (in Toronto). Benjy eventually returns to New Jersey with his mother to reunite with his father, Trevor.

Over Benjy's tenure, Monk bonds with him but has his problems in relating since he never did most of the things that kids do while growing up. As a result, he is clueless in giving Benjy a pep talk about baseball in "Mr. Monk Goes to the Ballgame", as Benjy has to show him how to hold a bat. In "Mr. Monk Meets the Playboy", Sharona tells him of her less than reputable past. This is nearly revealed by playboy Dexter Larsen if Monk had persisted in his current homicide investigation. She confesses, knowing Benjy would be open to ridicule and perhaps lose respect for her. Benjy reassures her that he can handle it.

He is in little league in "Mr. Monk Goes to the Ballgame". He is a sixth-grader and wants to be a writer in "Mr. Monk Takes a Vacation", in which he witnesses cleaning maids murdering one of their own while pulling off an insider trading scheme.

His first appearance in any Monk-related material after he and Sharona left the television show is in the Lee Goldberg novel Mr. Monk and the Two Assistants, where Sharona returns to San Francisco because Trevor has been accused of murder. Since Sharona is working as a nurse, Benjy is living with her sister Gail. Over the course of the novel, Benjy develops a friendship with Julie Teeger. However, in the novel, Benjy's first name is misspelled as "Benji" whenever he is mentioned.

Benjy and his mother are mentioned in "Mr. Monk Is on the Run (Part Two)", having sent flowers for the "deceased" Monk and flying in to attend his "funeral".

In the season eight episode "Mr. Monk and Sharona", Sharona mentions that Benjy is making plans to attend college, and he plans on using money from her lawsuit against a country club for the death of her uncle, Howard Fleming. However, Monk thinks that Howard's death was foul play, irritating cash-strapped Sharona. At the end of the episode, Sharona trips and breaks her arm on one of the country club's steps, meaning she will get the money after all.

=== Trudy Monk ===
Trudy Monk
- First appearance: "Mr. Monk and the Candidate"
- Last appearance: "Mr. Monk and the End - Part II"
- Portrayed by: Stellina Rusich (2002–2003); Melora Hardin (2004–2009); Lindy Newton (2006 college flashbacks)

In-universe information
- Gender: Female
- Occupation: Journalist
- Family: Dwight Ellison (father); Marcia Ellison (mother); Jack Monk Sr. (father-in-law); Agnes Monk (mother-in-law); Ambrose Monk (brother-in-law); Jack Monk Jr. (half-brother-in-law); Molly Evans (daughter)
- Spouses: Adrian Monk (married at time of death)

Trudy Anne Ellison Monk is Adrian's beloved deceased wife, played by Stellina Rusich in the first two seasons and Melora Hardin after the third season. In the season five episode "Mr. Monk and the Class Reunion", a younger Trudy is portrayed in a flashback by Lindy Newton. Adrian's attempt to solve the case of her murder is the show's longest-running plot arc.

Trudy Monk was born in Los Angeles in 1962 to Dwight and Marcia Ellison. She attended the Ashton Preparatory School and graduated valedictorian in 1977, at the age of 15. She did not date very much while there, expecting to know who the right man would be once she found him. Trudy and Adrian met during his senior year at UC Berkeley (episode "Mr. Monk and the Class Reunion"). They married on August 8, 1990.

In 1993, Trudy was involved in a lawsuit with the financier Dale "The Whale" Biederbeck because she referred to him as the "Genghis Khan of Finance". Dale was unable to win the lawsuit, but the Monks were forced to sell their house paying for their lawyer. Adrian harbors an intense hatred for Dale because of the pain he caused Trudy, saying that he stole a year of her life. Dale remains an important adversary of Adrian's, especially when it is revealed that he was hiding something he knew about Trudy's death.

In Adrian's words, Trudy "enjoyed poetry, was often barefoot, and kept every promise she ever made". Adrian offers a glimpse into her mindset (in "Mr. Monk Takes Manhattan") by turning Warrick Tennyson's morphine back on after he had turned it off claiming Trudy would have wanted him to.

Trudy Monk was murdered on a snowy December 14, 1997 with a car bomb, made of approximately three pounds of plastic explosives, powered by ten 20 volt magnesium batteries, that was planted under the front seat and remotely detonated by a cell phone. She was on an errand to get cough medicine for Adrian's brother, Ambrose. Ambrose blames himself for Trudy's death, and his guilt led to a seven-year rift between the brothers.

While having a temporary relapse (in "Mr. Monk Can't See a Thing"), Adrian mentions that Trudy lived for 20 minutes after the bomb went off. Her last words to a paramedic were "bread and butter", a message to Adrian meaning that she would never leave him, as this was something she always told her husband when they had to temporarily let go of each other for some reason or another.

The bomb was built by Warrick Tennyson. Tennyson mentions (in "Mr. Monk Takes Manhattan") that he did not recognize the man who hired him, but remembers that there were six fingers on his right hand. From the time of Trudy's death until the end of season two, Monk believes all along that he was the intended target, with Trudy being an innocent victim. The intense guilt contributed to and intensified his nervous breakdown, his obsessive-compulsive manifestations, and his bizarre phobias.

Dale reveals (in "Mr. Monk Goes to Jail") that the car bomb was actually intended for her, not him. Discovering that Trudy was the true target, Adrian is seen to be visibly affected by this piece of news.

False leads include (in "Mr. Monk Bumps His Head") a man who attempts to sell a faked picture of the six-fingered man and (in "Mr. Monk and Mrs. Monk") a lookalike who pretends to be Trudy come back after having faked her own death.

Adrian (in "Mr. Monk Is Up All Night") sees a Brazilian woman whom he chases for several blocks for no apparent reason. It is later revealed that the reason he was drawn to her is that she literally has Trudy's eyes, received via a post mortem cornea transplant.

During the season six finale ("Mr. Monk Is on the Run"), Adrian finds the six-fingered man, named Frank Nunn, who is soon shot and killed by John Rollins, a corrupt Angel County sheriff recruited by Dale in a plot to incriminate Adrian. By the end of the episode, Adrian confronts Dale, telling him that the police searched Nunn's house after he died. The police discovered some old letters in which Nunn talked about killing Trudy and also mentioned that he was hired by a man named "The Judge". Adrian believes Dale knows the identity of "The Judge", but so far, Dale had not revealed any further information.

Monk discovers (in "Mr. Monk and the End Part 1") that Trudy had left him a videotape, containing a message stating that she wanted him to watch in case harm were to befall her. Later, Monk and Natalie watch the videotape, which reveals that Trudy had a child with her professor, Ethan Rickover, who is now a judge. Rickover hid the baby from Trudy by claiming that she died nine minutes after birth. Then, Monk learns that, in fact, Rickover had saved the baby girl who is now a 26-year-old movie critic named Molly with whom he connects and grows to love.

=== Harold Krenshaw ===
Harold Krenshaw
- First appearance: "Mr. Monk and the Girl Who Cried Wolf"
- Last appearance: "Mr. Monk Goes to Group Therapy" "Mr. Monk and the End - Part II (flashback only)
- Portrayed by: Tim Bagley (2004–2009)

In-universe information
- Gender: Male
- Occupation: School Board Member, City Council Member
- Family: Joey Krenshaw (Cousin); Clarissa Krenshaw (Wife); Jimmy Krenshaw (Son)

Harold J. Krenshaw (Tim Bagley) is another patient of Dr. Kroger and later Dr. Bell who also has obsessive-compulsive disorder. Despite sharing the same disorder, Monk and Harold are constantly at odds, mostly over which of them is liked better by Dr. Kroger or Dr. Bell, or which of them have made more progress in overcoming their various problems. Monk frequently comments that Harold has more psychological problems than does Monk himself; while Monk has just OCD, Harold also has acute paranoia and narcissism (in "Mr. Monk and the Daredevil," for example, Monk recalls that Harold was stricken by an attack of vertigo when Dr. Kroger reupholstered his office with thicker carpet. Later, when talking to some Frisco Fly fans, Monk claims that Harold was a bed wetter until he was 34 and he has to be hypnotized just to get a haircut). As a result, he deludes himself that everyone is out to get him, either because of his importance in the scheme of things or because he inspires outrageous jealousy in everyone else. He often takes great pleasure in "getting" other people before they get him, especially Monk. Harold is married and has a son, Jimmy.

Harold's first appearance was brief, in a scene in the season three episode "Mr. Monk and the Girl Who Cried Wolf" when he and Monk bicker over the arrangement of magazines in Dr. Kroger's waiting room. Monk prefers the magazines to be arranged in two vertical rows of three. Harold prefers the horizontal top row to have three, the middle row have two, and the bottom row have one (in an arrangement similar to the style of bowling pins), and wants them arranged by type, instead of in alphabetical order.

In "Mr. Monk and the Election", Harold defeats Natalie Teeger in an election to become a member of Julie Teeger's school board.

In the season five episode "Mr. Monk Gets a New Shrink", Harold again plays a very prominent role, as he is with Monk and Dr. Kroger when they find the body of Dr. Kroger's cleaning lady Teresa Mueller in Dr. Kroger's office. Later, when Monk and Dr. Kroger are being held hostage in the back of Francis Merrigan's truck, Harold, who has followed the truck, is the one who alerts the police to their whereabouts. When Merrigan shoots at Dr. Kroger with a pistol, Harold takes a bullet in the chest to save Dr. Kroger's life, telling Adrian to "beat that."

In the season six episode "Mr. Monk and the Buried Treasure", Monk agrees to help Dr. Kroger's son Troy decipher what appears to be a treasure map (actually a map to a dead bank robber's body) in an attempt to once more outdo Harold, who has just given Dr. Kroger a wristwatch.

In the season six episode "Mr. Monk and the Daredevil", Harold eclipses a jealous Monk in fame when the public at large believes him to be a notorious human fly known only as the Frisco Fly. In reality, Harold was dropped into the role by his cousin Joey who was trying to kill him over an inheritance from their dying uncle. The real Frisco Fly was a man named Victor Grajna, who died several days earlier in a car accident which Joey discovered. Joey burned Grajna's car to torch any evidence that Grajna was the Frisco Fly, and stole Grajna's outfit. Then Joey drugged Harold, took him up to the top of a high-rise building, outfitted him in the daredevil costume, and let Harold fall to what should have been his death had not an awning and a flagpole broken his fall. Unaware of the murder plot, Harold plays along with the charade because he loves the public attention, getting a golden opportunity to infuriate Monk, and gaining new respect and admiration from his own son, Jimmy.

In the season six episode "Mr. Monk Joins a Cult", Dr. Kroger mentions that the Siblings of the Sun cult tried to recruit Harold a few years prior, but he was too smart for them.

In the season seven episode "Mr. Monk Gets Hypnotized", Harold has tried out hypnotic regression therapy with Dr. Lawrence Climan (Richard Schiff) which at first seems to cure him of his OCD. While investigating the "abduction" of actress Sally Larkin, Harold shows up at the crime scene and tells Monk about his new therapist, that he is over their feud, and also gives him Dr. Climan's business card. Seeing Harold so happy, Monk cannot concentrate on the case, so he decides to ignore the risks, goes to Dr. Climan and comes out acting like a six-year-old. Though Monk eventually is able to snap himself out of his hypnotic state by looking at a reflection of himself, hypnotherapy backfires on Harold when his feelings of euphoria lead him to take off all of his clothes in public, causing him to get arrested for indecent exposure (which Monk happens to witness).

Harold makes a brief cameo appearance in "Mr. Monk's 100th Case", for a small interview on a television special commemorating Monk's solving of his 100th case, which Harold derides. He also says that he thinks his new therapist is better than Monk's. Due to the fact that "Mr. Monk Gets Hypnotized" is the episode that aired immediately after this one, it is implied that Harold is referring to Dr. Climan.

Harold also appears in the season seven finale, "Mr. Monk Fights City Hall". Now serving on the San Francisco City Council, Harold initially votes against Adrian's motion to preserve the parking garage where Trudy was murdered, instead of demolishing it to build a children's playground. At first, Monk sways the majority of the council to vote in his favor, but inadvertently tips the vote when he insults one of the other council members while exposing reporter Paul Crawford as a murderer. Harold also (thanks to an inadvertent slip from Natalie) learns the name of Monk's new therapist, Dr. Bell, and announces that he will also be seeing Dr. Bell in the future.

Harold has a cameo appearance in the season eight episode, "Mr. Monk is Someone Else", when Monk goes to Los Angeles masquerading as a mob hit man by the name of Frank DePalma. When Monk is having lunch at an outdoor cafe with Lenny Barlowe and Tommy G., a rollerblading Harold calls out to "Adrian". By a stroke of luck, Monk manages to avoid breaking character and tells Harold that he has made a mistake, and threatens to kill him if he does not back away. Then Monk shows himself off as a "tough guy" by shoving Harold away, who then apologizes.

In his final appearance, "Mr. Monk Goes to Group Therapy", Monk finds himself sharing group therapy sessions with Harold when his HMO refuses to compensate him for any more individual sessions with Dr. Bell. The two butt heads constantly, even to the point that when two of their other group members are killed under mysterious circumstances, Harold accuses Monk of being the killer. Both Monk and Harold are ultimately kidnapped by Xavier Danko, the real killer, and thrown into the trunk of his car together, where they both break down with claustrophobia and finally become friends: Harold admits that he has greatly exaggerated his own progress to goad Adrian, while Adrian admits that he envies Harold's relative success in going on with his life despite his many fears. The two men realize that they share many of the same problems, and even overcome their claustrophobia together when Monk convinces Harold to see the trunk as a protective space rather than a trap.

Afterwards, in an extraordinary gesture, Harold voluntarily transfers to another psychiatrist, to let Monk's "group sessions" with Dr. Bell be individual sessions after all.

=== Ambrose Monk ===
Ambrose Monk
- First appearance: "Mr. Monk and the Three Pies"
- Last appearance: "Mr. Monk's 100th Case" "Mr. Monk and the End - Part II (flashback only)
- Portrayed by: John Turturro (2004, 2005, 2008)

In-universe information
- Gender: Male
- Occupation: Technical writer of instruction manuals and language dictionaries
- Family: Jack Monk Sr. (father); Agnes Monk (mother); Adrian Monk (brother); Jack Monk Jr. (half-brother); Trudy Monk (sister-in-law; deceased); Yuki Nakamura (wife)

Ambrose Monk, played by John Turturro, is Adrian's older agoraphobic brother. Ambrose has both more severe problems than Adrian and more acute powers of observation. (Echoing the relationship between Sherlock Holmes and his more cerebral but sedentary brother Mycroft).

As stated by Adrian in "Mr. Monk and the Three Pies", Ambrose has not left his house for 32 years, having last set foot outside in 1972. Adrian also reveals that Ambrose and their mother were in a state of catatonia after their father left. In fact, Ambrose did not even leave his room for an unspecified amount of time.

He can be seen in person in three episodes: "Mr. Monk and the Three Pies", "Mr. Monk Goes Home Again" and "Mr. Monk's 100th Case", as well as in home movies he spliced together himself during "Mr. Monk Is on the Air". He has a romantic interest in Natalie Teeger, Adrian's second assistant. Ambrose writes owner's manuals for many different consumer products in multiple languages which he taught himself (seven and a half, as of "Mr. Monk and the Three Pies"; the half is for his ongoing study of Mandarin Chinese). The house is cluttered with his work, piles of newspapers (every single day since Ambrose last left the house), and filing cabinets that are stuffed with his father's mail spanning the entirety of his father's absence.

Ambrose blames himself for Trudy's death. When she was killed by the bomb planted under her car, she had gone on an errand to buy Ambrose some cough medicine at his request. Guilt-ridden, Ambrose avoided all contact with Adrian for seven years after that incident.

Ever since their father left, Ambrose has been obsessed with the idea of his return, even to the point of preparing a dinner plate for him every night, just in case. Adrian feels differently, believing his father will never return. However, their father shows up at Ambrose's doorstep to leave a note. Adrian and Ambrose miss their father's appearance while in an ambulance because they think he has been poisoned by a Neptune candy bar. Their father leaves a note, congratulating Ambrose on leaving the house. Ambrose has left the house three times: the first two times are in "Mr. Monk and the Three Pies", the first being when his next-door neighbor Pat van Ranken sets the house on fire, and the second to visit Trudy's grave, and the third one mentioned above in "Mr. Monk Goes Home Again".

In "Mr. Monk's 100th Case", he appears in a documentary about Adrian and says his brother held the family together after Jack Monk left them. Both he and his mother became unable to deal with the outside world, and Adrian saved them. He greatly respects his brother's ability to cope with the outside world.

Even though Ambrose's last television appearance was in 2008, he continued to appear in the Monk novel series by Lee Goldberg. In Mr. Monk in Outer Space, he is shown to be a fan of the science fiction series Beyond Earth, and has even written a number of books about the series itself. It is also revealed that he is a good lip-reader, as he can read what a shooter on a surveillance tape is saying. Ambrose is also shown to have learned Pig Latin and the Dratch constructed language of Beyond Earth. Hence, he plays a big part in helping Adrian's investigation into the murder of Beyond Earth creator Conrad Stipe and later executive producer Kingston Mills. He identifies Mills's killer by reading his lips and creating a written translation.

He later appeared in the novel Mr. Monk Is Cleaned Out when Adrian briefly moves in after he gets evicted from his apartment. This novel reveals that Ambrose wrote the instruction manual for the Triax tracking device that is utilized by alleged Ponzi schemer Bob Sebes, whom Adrian suspects as having killed three government witnesses about to testify against him for their parts in the scheme.

In the novel, Mr. Monk On the Road, Adrian, having found a balance in the world, knocks Ambrose out by drugging him with a sleeping pill placed in his birthday cake, then (with aid from Natalie) puts Ambrose in an RV. The novel serves to allow Adrian to help Ambrose get over his agoraphobia. In the end, Ambrose buys the RV that Adrian and Natalie rented for the trip. The novel also reveals that Ambrose became agoraphobic after he caught Hong Kong flu.

Starting in Mr. Monk On the Couch, Ambrose has a live-in assistant, Yuki Nakamura, introduced in Mr. Monk on the Road. In the book Mr. Monk Gets Even, they get married.

=== Kevin Dorfman ===
Kevin Dorfman
- First appearance: "Mr. Monk and the Paperboy"
- Last appearance: "Mr. Monk and the Magician" (flashback only: "Mr. Monk and the End - Part II)
- Portrayed by: Jarrad Paul

In-universe information
- Gender: Male
- Occupation: Accountant, Amateur Magician
- Family: Sheila (aunt); Lou (uncle); Vicky Salinas (ex-wife); Sy Dorfman (uncle)

Kevin Dorfman (Jarrad Paul) is Monk's talkative upstairs neighbor. He appears in five episodes, his last appearance being the season seven episode, "Mr. Monk and the Magician".

Kevin has a motor mouth, and every topic must be discussed in full detail. In "Mr. Monk and the Magician," Monk recalls a time when Kevin had a sore throat, then "talked for two and a half hours about how much it hurt him to talk". As Monk and Natalie observe at Kevin's wake, this trait actually appears to be genetic. Natalie has a photo of Kevin on display, which she at first claims took over two hours to take because she wanted one where he was not talking, but upon noticing a skeptical look from Monk, admits to having used Photoshop.

Kevin first appears in "Mr. Monk and the Paperboy", where he wins a $43 million lottery, although his "girlfriend" Vicki Salinas (Nicole DeHuff), a clerk at the nearby Stop-N-Go convenience store, tries to hide it from him with the objective of eventually getting it all. Her accomplice, the store's night manager, kills paperboy Nestor Alvarez while trying to steal newspapers that they think are Kevin's (they are actually Monk's papers). Later, Vicki kills the accomplice by stabbing him with a cream soda bottle while he is making the store's night deposit. Vicki then tries killing Kevin by stopping their car at a certain point in the road and drugging him - which happens to be on a grade crossing right as the lights begin to flash and the gates begin to lower. Monk and Sharona arrive, having followed him thanks to a travel brochure, and after a struggle with Vicki, throw the switch at the crossover to shift the approaching train to the other track, just in the nick of time, sparing Kevin.

Although Kevin gets his money back, by the time he makes his next appearance in "Mr. Monk and the Game Show," he has lost it all to a number of serious misfortunes, including gambling losses, two greedy wives, and a dishonest accountant. A CPA, he has two sisters, can recall every time he has eaten an egg salad sandwich in his life (eight altogether), and once worked for two non-consecutive summers at a coffee shop in Aspen, Colorado. In "Mr. Monk and the Game Show", he accompanies Monk on a trip to Los Angeles when Trudy's father, Dwight Ellison, asks Monk to investigate possible cheating on a game show that he produces. Kevin steals a pencil that the host had been chewing on, claiming it as a "collectible"; later in the episode, he and Monk find a pencil with identical chew marks at the reigning champion's house and conclude that he and the host have colluded to rig the game.

Kevin is mentioned briefly in the season four episode "Mr. Monk Gets Drunk", and while he does not make a personal appearance in the story, it is revealed that Monk entrusted Kevin to pick up his mail for him while he and Natalie drove out to Napa Valley to visit his and Trudy's honeymoon retreat.

Kevin also makes a short appearance in the season four episode, "Mr. Monk and Mrs. Monk", where he and Monk are shown in the kitchen, preparing food and happily chatting together, while Natalie broods over the impossible notion that Trudy might still be alive.

In the season five episode "Mr. Monk Is On the Air", Kevin and Natalie are shown one of Monk's old home videos, where Kevin lightheartedly comments that seeing his friends' old home videos 'always makes him feel better about his own family', and later that night, when Monk is preparing to face Max Hudson on the radio, Kevin gives him some of his uncle's jokes for use as Monk prepares to accuse Max of murdering his wife Jeanette. It is also revealed that he had an uncle who was a comedian that knew Uncle Miltie. During the radio broadcast, Kevin calls in as a fan to compliment Hudson, but he actually called in just to support Monk.

Kevin is mentioned once more in the season seven episode "Mr. Monk Takes a Punch", when Monk, after learning that he has to pass a physical fitness test to continue his work as a consultant for the police, shows up at a track field dressed in a purple jogging suit. When Natalie asks where he got the suit, Monk reveals that Kevin lent it to him.

By the beginning of the penultimate season seven episode, "Mr. Monk and the Magician," Kevin is working as an accountant for professional magician, mentor, and 'supposedly' close friend, Karl Torini (Steve Valentine). He is also revealed to be an amateur magician himself. While doing Torini's books, Kevin notices that the airlines are probably overcharging Torini, as for whatever reason, his receipts show that his equipment seems to weigh more when he comes back to the United States than it does when he leaves. Unknown to Kevin, Torini is secretly trafficking heroin for an Asian drug cartel. Fearing he might be caught, Torini and his assistant Tanya Adams come up with a plot to kill Kevin on the night of his debut. After checking into their hotel in Reno, Nevada, Torini drives back to the Magic Castle Theater and sneaks in posing as a repairman. Torini and Tanya then stage a phone call to make it seem like they are both in Reno at the time (when Torini is actually hiding in the basement of the theater). After the show, Torini strangles and kills Kevin in his dressing room with a piece of piano wire, then leaves the building disguised as a repairman. Unfortunately, he is spotted by Monk (who is looking for Kevin) and accidentally gives himself away when he gestures in the direction of the dressing rooms with his middle two fingers together (Monk concludes that Torini was the so-called "maintenance man" when Torini makes a similar gesture at Kevin's funeral). Monk opens the door to the dressing room minutes later to find Kevin's dead body.

Despite the fact that Monk is always shown to be annoyed by Kevin, he is seen crying after Kevin's murder, hinting at a possible friendship they had. As difficult as it is for Monk to take upon the case of a victim he knows, he accepts it with the determination of seeing to it that Torini is caught.

Torini and Tanya both feign innocence when Monk and Natalie question them at their loft apartment. In the same scene, Monk is also forced to endure a blatant insult to Kevin's memory when Torini writes down a phony confession that he is responsible for Kevin's murder on a piece of paper, which he folds and places in Monk's hand. Seconds later, it blows up in flames, and Torini jeers: "Abracadabra, Mr. Monk."

After Torini's arrest, Monk and Natalie watch a video will that Kevin had made, and despite his tendency to ramble about various things, Monk lets the video play.

== Recurring characters and special appearances ==
=== Jack Monk Jr. ===
Jack Monk Jr.
- First appearance: "Mr. Monk Meets His Dad" (mentioned only)
- Last appearance: "Mr. Monk's Other Brother"
- Portrayed by: Steve Zahn (2009)

In-universe information
- Gender: Male
- Family: Jack Monk Sr. (father)Adrian Monk (half-brother); Ambrose Monk (half-brother); Trudy Monk (half-sister-in-law; deceased)

Jack Monk Jr. (Steve Zahn) is Adrian and Ambrose's half-brother. Jack Monk Sr. left him and his mother Darlene after ten years of marriage.

Jack Jr. meets Adrian after he is arrested and imprisoned for attempting to sell cars that are not his own. He escapes from prison but is framed for murdering Lindsey Bishop, one of the social workers at the prison, right afterwards. Jack goes to Adrian in hopes that Adrian can clear his name.

Jack Jr. appears to be a pathological liar and often swears "hand to God" that he is telling the truth when in actuality he is not. Jack Jr. makes repeated efforts to ingratiate himself to his older half-brother by stammering and sniveling helplessly, even going so far as to stage a phony phone call from his girlfriend who pretends to be his mother, who bawls sappily, begging Adrian to help her little "Jackie". Despite being family, Adrian is thoroughly repulsed by Jack's display of complete immaturity, and at one point, he deems him "the most selfish human being he's ever met." Jack Jr. also has an unusual obsession with the country of Paraguay. Adrian does not know what this may mean until he mentions this to Dr. Bell. Adrian becomes furious when he learns that Jack's obsession with Paraguay is because its new extradition laws do not allow for extraditing individuals indicted for crimes other than murder. Adrian confronts Jack in front of Natalie, just as Jack is conning her into signing a check for an orphanage in Quebec.

Eventually, Adrian finds that Jack was framed by Daniel Reese, a guard at the prison who was Lindsey's boyfriend and the real killer, and his feelings about Jack start to change. Jack is able to overcome Reese by running him over with Natalie's car. He goes back to prison, though Randy's handcuff key "went missing". He is mentioned in "Mr. Monk Meets His Dad". In that episode, the people at Tiger Bay happen to confuse Adrian for Jack Jr., because they do not know about Adrian and Ambrose, the other two sons of Jack Sr.

Adrian enjoys bonding with Jack, and even goes so far as to protect him by giving him the phony name of Jack Gretzky and claiming that Jack is his penpal (despite the name, Adrian has to tell others that Jack is not related to Canadian hockey player Wayne Gretzky).

=== Marci Maven ===
Marci Maven
- First appearance: "Mr. Monk and the TV Star"
- Last appearance: "Mr. Monk's 100th Case"
- Portrayed by: Sarah Silverman (2004, 2007, 2008)

In-universe information
- Gender: Female
- Occupation: President of the Monk-o-Philes club

Marci Maven (Sarah Silverman) is Monk's biggest fan and has made three appearances on the series. Marci first appears in "Mr. Monk and the TV Star" as a fan of Brad Terry, the star of the crime drama television series Crime Lab S.F.. As Monk and Sharona are first investigating the murder of Brad Terry's ex-wife Susan Malloy, Marci hands an envelope to Sharona, saying that it is a petition to get the old theme song back, since quite a lot of people hate the new theme song of Crime Lab S.F. However, Marci also dislikes the now-deceased Susan Malloy, since Susan only made one movie, called Frat Party Massacre, which Marci has watched several times. This makes Marci a primary suspect, and she is finally cornered by Stottlemeyer and Disher at the Crime Lab S.F. 100th episode cast party. At first, she confesses to murdering Brad's ex-wife, and Monk is convinced. But when Monk sees the renowned TV star lie to one of his scriptwriters about her script, he is convinced that Brad Terry is guilty. He confronts Marci about the matter, stating that she is protecting Brad because she knows he killed his ex-wife. After Brad is arrested, Marci is released from jail. A few nights later, Marci shows up at Monk's door convincing him that if he ever gets his own show, he should never change the theme song. (The theme song controversy surrounding Crime Lab S.F. is a parody of the controversy around the replacement of the original instrumental theme song for Monk with "It's a Jungle Out There".)

Marci returns in "Mr. Monk and His Biggest Fan". In this episode, she has started a website about Monk, and we see her digitally replacing Natalie's head with her own. The police show up, asking if Marci owns a dog named Otto, who apparently attacked and mauled to death Debbie Ringel, the wife of Marci's neighbor John Ringel. Marci shows them Otto's grave. When she shows up at Monk's apartment the next day, Natalie is able to shoo Marci out.

Later, as Linda Fusco bids for Stottlemeyer at the San Francisco Police Department's Bachelor Auction, Marci bids for Monk, resulting in a bidding match between her and Natalie that Marci wins after Natalie runs out of money. The next day, Marci shows Monk how much she loves him, wearing his old pants, serving his drink in his old glass, even showing him a diorama of them based on the season two episode "Mr. Monk and the Three Pies", while singing him a song on her guitar about him. She has even written fan-fiction centered around Monk, including one story entitled "Mr. Monk and the Dragon's Lair". Then Marci explains the problem she is dealing with: she knows Otto died three days before Mrs. Ringel was apparently "mauled", and the teeth marks on her body match Otto. Monk finds many clues that suggest that Otto was framed, and so Monk, Natalie, and Marci go to several lumber yards in the area. At John Ringel's lumberyard, they find clues that explain Otto's day-long disappearance of about two weeks earlier, the simple explanation being that Ringel made a pruning-type device that could make dog tooth marks on his wife's body after he murdered her.

Due to her obsession with Monk, Marci is well-educated on just about every aspect of Monk's life and career. Although Monk is mostly annoyed by her, he becomes momentarily flattered when Marci starts acting as his buffer in relation to his personal quirks and social dealings with people. In one scene, Marci actually performs Monk's obsessive-compulsive tendencies for him, where she straightens a man's hat and evens out his sleeves in a perfect imitation of Monk's behavior, and all Monk has to do is stand and wait. Marci firmly lays various 'ground rules' of what the man can and cannot say to Monk before permitting the man to talk to him. Marci even offers to be Monk's personal assistant for free, which would relieve him of having to write a paycheck. Deep down inside, Monk is more flattered and delighted about the convenience of having Marci around than he cares to admit, and once Natalie notices this, she temporarily forces him to accept Marci's offer. "That woman is as obsessive and compulsive as you are." Natalie tells him, and she heads home, leaving Monk alone with Marci.

Marci loses interest in Monk when Ringel shoots her during a hostage situation at his lumberyard. Although she has only been hit in the shoulder, she decides she is no longer interested in pursuing her interest in him. At the end of the episode, she gives Monk a package holding all his stuff she took, saying her new obsession, F. Murray Abraham "wouldn't understand"--"May God have mercy on his soul," Monk tells Natalie. However, she reappears in "Mr. Monk's 100th Case", interviewed in a television show, reverting once again to her obsession with Monk. At one point in "Mr. Monk and His Biggest Fan", she stated, "I'm not crazy, just a fan". By a strange coincidence, Monk says the exact line to actress Christine Rapp (of The Cooper Clan) in "Mr. Monk's Favorite Show".

=== Jack Monk Sr. ===
Jack Monk
- First appearance: "Mr. Monk Meets His Dad"
- Last appearance: "Mr. Monk and the End - Part II" (flashback only)
- Portrayed by: Dan Hedaya (2006)

In-universe information
- Gender: Male
- Occupation: Truck driver
- Family: Trudy Monk (daughter-in-law; deceased)
- Children: Adrian Monk (son); Ambrose Monk (son); Jack Monk Jr. (son)

Jack Monk Sr., played by Dan Hedaya, is the father of Ambrose and Adrian Monk. He appears in the 2006 Christmas special of season five, "Mr. Monk Meets His Dad." Jack abandoned his young family while running to pick up an order of Chinese food. Adrian was only eight years old, and this abandonment is seemingly the catalyst for both his and Ambrose's psychological illnesses. After leaving, Jack is not heard from for over forty years. During that time, he fathered yet another son, 31‑year‑old Jack Jr. whom Jack proudly brags about to his co-workers as a genius doctor. To Adrian's surprise, he later admits that Jack Jr. is an unemployed buffoon who smokes marijuana all day and steals money from his wallet.

Jack also makes an appearance (albeit an unseen one) in the season four episode, "Mr. Monk Goes Home Again" at Ambrose's door. He leaves Ambrose a handwritten note saying that he had stopped by the house only to find no one there, and that he does not blame him or Adrian for not waiting on him. Unbeknownst to Jack, the brothers had left because Ambrose was being rushed to the hospital in an ambulance after having eaten what he thought was a poisoned candy bar. The note ends with Jack's congratulations to Ambrose for leaving the house.

Little is known about Jack Monk's personal history. Adrian establishes in the above-mentioned episode that Jack wrote school textbooks as his career of choice (although in the episode "Mr. Monk's 100th Case" he is referred to as "a frustrated linen salesman"), similar to Ambrose, and indicating some level of education. Not much explanation is provided for how he ends up in the state explored in "Mr. Monk Meets His Dad".

When Jack finally shows up in person, he is working for the Midland, Texas-based Tiger Bay Trucking Company and had been stopped in San Francisco for running a red light. He is arrested and placed in jail because he shoved a cop and resisted arrest. Initially, Adrian's reception to his father is icy and uninviting, but the two later reconcile over a road trip, where they suspiciously travel by the longer back roads. This is later revealed to be because of Jack's boss, Ben Glazer, who was trying to destroy evidence that would link him to the death of his partner, Kenneth Woods. The novel Mr. Monk in Outer Space reveals that Jack stopped to visit Ambrose after coming back to San Francisco.

Although Jack Sr. is portrayed as eccentric, unpleasant, and erratic, he is also apparently quite intelligent, possibly implying that Ambrose and Adrian inherited at least some of their prodigious mental abilities from their father.

=== Gail Fleming ===
Gail Fleming (Amy Sedaris) is Sharona's younger sister and an actress. She first appeared in "Mr. Monk and the Earthquake", where Sharona, Benjy, and Monk stay at her house after a magnitude 6.0 earthquake. Her second appearance is in "Mr. Monk Goes to the Theater". In this episode, she is framed by her understudy Jenna Ryan for stabbing actor Hal Duncan in a performance of the play Blood on the Moon during a preview performance prior to it heading to New York City. In "Earthquake" she remarks to Sharona that she thinks Sharona copies her by moving to San Francisco, buying the same purse, etc. Gail also makes an appearance in the novel Mr. Monk and the Two Assistants, where it is revealed that she is dating an accountant.

=== Cheryl Fleming ===
Cheryl Fleming (Betty Buckley) is Sharona's and Gail's mother. When her husband Douglas died, she was left to raise her daughters alone. She visits Sharona in "Mr. Monk Goes to the Theater", just when Gail is framed for murder. She then begs Monk to take the case, which he eventually does, though reluctantly. Trying to impress her, Sharona tells her that she is Monk's partner, not his assistant/nurse. She also tells her she is dating a stockbroker and that Benjy is on the honor roll.

=== Linda Fusco ===
Linda Salvato Fusco (Sharon Lawrence) is Captain Stottlemeyer's girlfriend and a real estate dealer during season five and the beginning of the season six. She first appears "Mr. Monk, Private Eye", when she hires Monk and Natalie to investigate damages done to her signature Buick Lucerne at the marina done by someone who left a threatening note on the car afterwards. The investigation eventually leads them to a local doctor named Jay Bennett (Fred Weller), who had hit Linda's car while driving from the marina after killing his girlfriend Anna Pollard out in the bay.

At one point during the investigation, Linda drops by Monk and Natalie's new office while they are talking with Stottlemeyer and Disher. Unlike Karen, Linda unashamedly presents herself to Stottlemeyer, Monk and Natalie as a very confident and calculating woman who will not be intimidated by anyone. Before Stottlemeyer can even formally introduce himself, she instantly recognizes Stottlemeyer as a divorcee (replying "I've been in the real estate business for fourteen years and I can smell divorce from a hundred feet away..."). Stottlemeyer is immediately impressed by Linda's crisp, cool demeanor. Sparks fly between the two, and by the end, she has set him up with a new apartment across the street from her own.

Linda and Stottlemeyer continue to see one another, but their dates are often interrupted, postponed, or canceled as a result of Stottlemeyer's duties. For instance, in the episode "Mr. Monk and His Biggest Fan", Linda resorts to bidding on a date with Stottlemeyer at a bachelor auction just to get him alone as Marci Maven resorts to bidding on a date with Monk. However, their date is interrupted when Stottlemeyer realizes that John Ringel is a murder suspect and framed Marci's dead dog. Before he leaves, however, Linda off-handedly remarks: "What's a girl gotta do to get your attention? Kill someone?", a statement that has more truth to it than Stottlemeyer realizes.

In "Mr. Monk and the Bad Girlfriend", Stottlemeyer's duties and the fact that Linda has moved uptown to Richmond means that she can only talk to him at 6:30 p.m. each night on webcam dates. They are planning on going to Hawaii. However, just before they leave for Hawaii, Linda's former business partner Sean Corcoran is shot dead by a shotgun-wielding intruder in front of a married couple during an open house tour. Monk and Natalie are sent to Marin County to investigate, where Monk determines that the shooter had a house key. When Monk and Natalie talk to Linda at her office, they come to the shocking conclusion that she is the killer, after Monk realizes that Linda has a strong motive (her victim was planning on starting his own real estate agency and taking many of their clients with him), she knows how to use a shotgun (as he notices a photo of a younger Linda with her deceased grandfather on a hunting trip, carrying a 12 gauge shotgun), she is 5'7" (the killer's height as described by the two eyewitnesses), she has a house key, and she wears the very shade of lipstick one witness remembered the shooter as wearing.

Although Monk and Natalie believe Linda is the shooter, there is just one problem: they and Stottlemeyer happen to be Linda's alibi for the murder, and Linda was chatting to them via webcam up until 20 minutes before the shooting. When Monk and Natalie try approaching Randy for an idea, Randy is skeptical because there is no reasonable way for Linda to go 32.2 miles from her house to the crime scene in 20 minutes at that time of day. This is confirmed when Monk and Natalie time the route on a motorcycle and it takes them an hour to travel the route. After the ride, Monk is about to feel relieved that Linda could not have done it....until they find a small hibiscus flower lodged in a bush outside the house, one that Monk remembers Linda wearing in her hair on the night of the shooting.

Monk and Natalie attempt to break the bad news to Stottlemeyer, but he refuses to be convinced, thinking Monk is being motivated out of pure jealousy, forgetting that Monk is always right when it comes to accusing someone of murder. Natalie tries to help convince him, but Stottlemeyer refuses to listen to another word. Fuming, he tells them "I'm gonna do you a favor... and pretend that this conversation never happened." This leaves Monk and Natalie in a compromising position, as they need more evidence against Linda to secure an arrest.

Monk comes to the conclusion that there is a chance that evidence incriminating Linda might be at her house. So he can search it, he has Natalie lure Linda away from her house on the pretense of looking at an apartment, while he searches it. Monk finds a form for a rental truck on a table in the front hallway, and a barrel cleaner and bottle of gun oil stashed in Linda's closet, but Linda comes home while he is searching, having been tipped off, and she attempts to seduce Monk. It fails, as Monk is next seen bolting of the house, bug-eyed, jumps into Natalie's car, and they quickly take off.

During a luau-themed sendoff party at the police station, Stottlemeyer and Linda dance with each other. Still believing Monk to be wrong about his suspicions toward Linda, he asks her about whether she has seen Monk. At once, Linda confesses plainly about Monk searching her house for evidence, but then she tells him in a nervously hushed voice that Monk made an advance at her and threatened to sleep with her. Stottlemeyer, having known Monk longer than Linda has and aware of Adrian's unwavering devotion to Trudy, instinctively realizes that she is lying.

Monk and Natalie catch Linda through a sting operation. Natalie crashes the party, sneaks into Stottlemeyer's office, and turns on the webcam. She then summons everyone into the office, to show Monk apparently talking to them from Linda's bedroom. Monk turns on some Hawaiian music on the stereo, at which point Linda turns off the camera, exasperated. However, Natalie opens the window to reveal that the music is still playing. Everyone traces the sound of the music downstairs to an impounded rental truck that was towed from Linda's street the day after the murder. Stottlemeyer then pushes up the rear door to find Monk sitting in a recreation of Linda's bedroom, that she had used for her alibi. Monk explains that he discovered how Linda forged her alibi when he remembered that during their video call just before the shooting, she put a pen down on the table next to her chair and it rolled away, but when he was in her real bedroom searching her house, he tried the same thing with his own pen, but it did not roll, leading him to conclude that Linda parked the truck on a hill. Linda is arrested, and Stottlemeyer is left asking himself if the relationship was real or merely something that she had planned from the beginning so she could have a perfect alibi for the murder. At the end of the episode, he tosses something into the ocean. When Randy asks him what he just threw, Stottlemeyer replies "It's just a rock," suggesting that he was going to propose to Linda while in Hawaii.

=== Trevor Howe ===
Trevor Howe (Frank John Hughes and David Lee Russek) is Sharona's ex-husband and Benjy's father from New Jersey. He appears in the episodes "Mr. Monk and the Sleeping Suspect" and "Mr. Monk and the Girl Who Cried Wolf". In "Mr. Monk and the Sleeping Suspect", he shows up at Sharona's house for Benjy's birthday, seemingly a "different man." Benjy is happy to have a father, which is one of the reasons Sharona decides to quit being Monk's assistant and move back to New Jersey with Trevor. She later discovers, however, that he got plane tickets to Detroit, where his rich uncle lives. Trevor admits to her that his reason for wanting to get back together with her was because his rich uncle had cut him off when he got divorced, and he wanted to get back together so that he would have access to his fortune. In his second appearance in the season three episode "Mr. Monk and the Girl Who Cried Wolf", Sharona asks Trevor to take Benjy when she becomes afraid she is losing her sanity, and hence crying wolf. In "Mr. Monk and the Red Herring", it is revealed that he has remarried Sharona. In the episode "Mr. Monk and Sharona", though, Sharona reveals that they have broken up for good.

Trevor also reappears in the novel Mr. Monk and the Two Assistants, having been framed for murder by the Los Angeles Police Department's private consultant Ian Ludlow, who frames five other people in addition to Natalie and Sharona for the murders he commits so that he can write his novels and meet his deadlines.

=== Trudy "T. K." Jensen ===
Trudy "T. K." Jensen Stottlemeyer (Virginia Madsen) is Captain Stottlemeyer's love interest (and then wife) in season eight. She initially appears in a three-episode story arc beginning with "Happy Birthday, Mr. Monk". She works for a magazine similar to Consumer Reports and is covering the debut of the new LaserVac self-cleaning vacuum. Throughout the episode, Leland tries to figure out what her nickname T.K. stands for, but when he finds out that her first name is Trudy, he suggests that they stick with calling her T.K. In the episode "Mr. Monk is the Best Man", she is proposed to by Stottlemeyer after they have been dating for six months. While trying to deal with the investigation into the murder of wanted ecoterrorist Martin Kettering, Leland finds himself in trouble when someone starts making threats against him and T.K. The stalker first breaks into and ransacks Leland's apartment, then uses a voice scrambler and calls T.K. to scare her, even setting Leland's car on fire and setting off a bomb at the wedding rehearsal. Monk eventually discovers that the attacks are the work of T.K.'s maid of honor and best friend Stephanie Briggs, who happens to be an accomplice of Kettering's and killed him after he blackmailed her for money. While fleeing the scene, a police car pulled her over for speeding and Stephanie was forced to hide the pistol she used inside Leland's tuxedo bag. It happened to be her third speeding offense, meaning that she got arrested and the car was impounded, so the threats against Leland were Stephanie getting increasingly desperate, trying to get the pistol back before Leland found it. Monk is shown to have been fine with T.K.'s name, believing that everyone should have a Trudy in their life.

=== Karen Stottlemeyer ===
Karen Stottlemeyer (Glenne Headly) is Leland's environmentally conscious wife during the first four seasons and the mother of their two children, Jared and Max. She spends much of her time filming unscripted documentaries.

Karen first met Leland when they were children explained in Mr. Monk and the Captain's Wife Leland says "We've known each other since we were kids-". It was given more detail much later in the series, according to Mr. Monk Goes to a Wedding he met her at a wedding.

Karen first appeared in "Mr. Monk and the Very, Very Old Man", where she begs Leland to investigate the death of Miles Holling, the oldest man in the world. Karen's documentary about Miles Holling, Miles Holling: The Human Time Machine, provides several clues for Monk and Leland about the man's death. The episode also establishes that their marriage is not necessarily stable, to such an extent that when Randy informs Leland that Karen wants to see him, Leland panics and has Randy keep her occupied while he gets his office reorganized (hanging a dreamcatcher from his lamp, hiding some of his personal junk, and installing a waterfall - that he fills with coffee).

Karen is also strongly against the use of guns. In "Mr. Monk and the Very Very Old Man", she gasps and is visibly uncomfortable when Randy tries distracting her by showing her his pistol. Additionally, she is under the impression that Leland never uses a gun (forcing Leland to hide his pistol in a desk drawer whenever she visits him at the office). In "Mr. Monk and the Captain's Marriage," Monk recalls to Natalie a weekend where Leland went on a hunting trip, while Karen stayed behind to organize a gun control rally.

Karen later appears in "Mr. Monk and the Captain's Wife", where she is temporarily put in a coma when Evan Coker, trying to recover a pistol stashed in his repossessed car, shoots the driver of the tow truck carrying the car, causing the truck to swerve into Karen's van.

In "Mr. Monk Gets Fired", Karen is seen filming a documentary of life in the San Francisco Police Department's Homicide Division, including many moments of Commissioner Brooks' anger and Paul Harley's arrest. In "Mr. Monk and the Captain's Marriage", Sergeant Ryan Sharkey Jr. claims to Leland that he is having an affair with Karen, provoking Leland into punching him. To find the truth, Leland sends Monk and Natalie to follow Karen. They ultimately find that Karen is not seeing someone, as first suspected, but is meeting with a divorce lawyer. She has a sister.

Karen is mentioned, but does not appear, in "Mr. Monk Goes to a Rock Concert". She calls Leland saying that Jared has skipped school and most likely has gone to a rock concert where Kris Kedder is performing, which leads Leland, Monk, and Natalie to go to the San Francisco Band Jam.

=== Mitch Teeger ===
Lieutenant Commander Mitch Teeger (1971–98) is Natalie's late husband and Julie's father, who was a fighter pilot in the United States Navy. He died in 1998 in the Kosovo War. He allegedly abandoned his men and took their supplies, but Natalie does not believe the reports, as revealed by Natalie in "Mr. Monk and the Election.” Much of what is known about Mitch is known through the Monk novel series by Lee Goldberg.

In the novel Mr. Monk Goes to Hawaii, Natalie reveals that Mitch died two days before his 27th birthday, which would place his birth date in 1971. The two of them once traveled to Mexico to elope, much to the horror of Natalie's parents. It is mentioned in Mr. Monk Goes to the Firehouse, and elaborated upon in Mr. Monk is Miserable, that Natalie and Mitch eloped to Paris. When Natalie later sees Paris in that novel, she claims it is a different Paris from the one to which she and Mitch had gone.

Mitch is introduced in the season three episode "Mr. Monk and the Red Herring". In the opening scene, a picture of Mitch with Julie is shown on one of the tables. As the story unfolds, it is established that he always wanted to be an astronaut and that he had received a letter from NASA about being accepted into their training program a few days after he died.

In addition to his services to the Navy, the episode shows that what Natalie admires and remembers most about Mitch was his selflessness and strength of character. When Monk has to retrieve a stolen moonrock from a thief in a science museum, Julie's pet fish ends up out of its tank, where it flops its way down one of the corridors, slowly dying. While danger closes in on him, Monk is faced with the choice of retrieving the moonrock, or Julie's fish. Despite the millions of dollars the moonrock is worth, Monk hurriedly saves the fish, returning it to its tank because Julie believes it is the same one Mitch had given her before he died.

That night at Natalie's house, Natalie reflects on what Monk did for Julie, telling her that the only other man she knows who would have cared more about Julie's fish than an item worth a lot of money was Mitch.

In the season eight episode "Mr. Monk and the Voodoo Curse", it is revealed that Natalie's superstitions about voodoo result from when she and Mitch lived on a military base in South Carolina. She met a voodoo priestess who predicted Mitch's death a few days before it actually happened.

The episode "Mr. Monk and the Three Julies" and the novel Mr. Monk and the Dirty Cop establish that Mitch taught Natalie how to shoot a gun, though Natalie's firearms skill are called into question in "Mr. Monk on Wheels". When Natalie grabs biotechnician Sarah Longson's pistol to force her to surrender, she whirls around so quickly that she accidentally discharges a bullet into Monk's right leg. Natalie brings this up in Mr. Monk and the Dirty Cop when holding crooked Intertect CEO Nick Slade up at gunpoint.

In the season five episode "Mr. Monk and the Class Reunion", when Monk is mentioning that he thinks he can handle his 25th college reunion on his own, Natalie offers to stay, knowing that he last met many of these students when he was with Trudy, and she remembers missing Mitch the most when going to parties or visiting friends after his death. Though Monk turns down her offer, as she is leaving, Natalie decides to go back for Monk.

In the season seven premiere "Mr. Monk Buys a House", it is presumed that Mitch also taught Natalie how to use Morse code. When Monk, Natalie, Stottlemeyer, and Disher visit Cassie Drake's house and Stottlemeyer and Disher start tapping messages to each other in Morse code on the door, Natalie chastises them, hinting that Mitch taught her Morse code. This comes in handy later in the episode: when Monk and Natalie are taken hostage by "Honest" Jake Phillips, Natalie sends up smoke signals in Morse code through the fireplace to call for help, due to a lack of other forms of communication.

In Mr. Monk and the Two Assistants, Natalie mentions that she and Monk actually have a lot in common. Both have lost spouses to violent deaths (Trudy to a car bomb, Mitch to a plane crash), and in both cases they were affected heavily and only saved thanks to someone else. In Monk's case, he hires Sharona and Stottlemeyer hires him as a consultant; in Natalie's case, Julie saved her.

The choice of Mitch as the first name of Natalie's late husband is a possible in-joke reference to the 1998 film Dirty Work; in that film, Traylor Howard plays the love interest of protagonist Mitch Weaver. Although Mitch is said to have died in the Kosovo War, in reality, the United States did not have any fatalities at all, either as the result of military combat or accidents.

Mitch is portrayed by Monk co-producer Doug Nabors, and can be seen in Natalie's pictures in her house and her car.

=== Troy Kroger ===
Troy Kroger (portrayed by Cody McMains) is the son of Dr. Kroger, with whom he has a stormy relationship. As revealed in the season five episode "Mr. Monk Gets a New Shrink", Charles has taken three paternity tests at the "request" of his son. Troy calls his parents by their first names and it turns out that Randy has arrested him at least once before (as Randy asks Troy if he's staying out of trouble, to which Troy says "No").

Troy later appears in the season six episode "Mr. Monk and the Buried Treasure". While skateboarding and ditching school with his friends Ridley and Pez, one of their skateboards hits the side of a parked car. When they go to apologize to Tony Gamelobo, the driver, they find him dead from a heart attack, and find a map in the back of his car plus satchels from a bank that was recently robbed. Thinking the map will lead them to where the bank robbers hid their loot, they ask Monk to help them, saying it is a school project. Monk agrees, and they eventually find it at a quarry. Monk, however, later discovers that he has been tricked when he learns about Gamelobo's true identity. When he and Troy return to the quarry in question, a bulldozer driven by crooked bank manager Steven Connolly (who masterminded the robbery) buries them alive, and Monk and Troy nearly suffocate. After they are rescued, it becomes clear that Troy has a better relationship with his father, and is planning to follow his father and study psychology in college. While buried alive, Troy also keeps Monk calm while they wait for help.

=== Steven Albright ===
Lieutenant Steven Albright (Casper Van Dien) is a lieutenant in the United States Navy and Mitch Teeger's oldest friend. In the season seven episode "Mr. Monk is Underwater", where he is introduced, he asks for Monk's help with the murder of Lieutenant Commander Jason Pierce while serving aboard USS Seattle, a Los Angeles-class submarine. Though he and Natalie are strongly attracted to each other, she is hesitant because of her lingering feelings for Mitch. He also saves the two from being drowned by Commander Nathan Whitaker, the person who killed Pierce. However, Steven reappears in the series finale, "Mr. Monk and the End", in which he and Natalie have been dating for a long time, and Natalie introduces him to Julie.

=== Warrick Tennyson ===
Warrick Tennyson
- First appearance: "Mr. Monk Goes to Jail" (Mentioned Only)
- Last appearance: "Mr. Monk Takes Manhattan"
- Portrayed by: Frank Collison (2004)

In-universe information
- Gender: Male

Warrick Tennyson was a career criminal and explosives expert who was hired to build the bomb in 1997 which killed Monk's wife Trudy. In "Mr. Monk Goes to Jail" (season 2), Dale the Whale tells Monk that Tennyson was involved in the murder and that he can be found in New York. Monk and his friends fly there in "Mr. Monk Takes Manhattan" (season 3), but learn that he is dying of heart disease and kidney failure in a hospital. Since he is being questioned in connection with a federal racketeering case, the district attorney is not allowing any visitors. An NYPD police captain makes a deal with Monk and his party: if they can solve the recent murder of a foreign ambassador, he will arrange for them to visit Tennyson.

Once Monk closes the case, the group visits Tennyson, who admits his involvement and says that he was hired by a man whose identity he never learned. However, he does remember that the man had six fingers on his right hand. During a moment alone with Monk, Tennyson asks for his forgiveness. Monk shuts off Tennyson's morphine drip, watches his face contort in pain for a moment, then turns it back on, saying that Trudy would not have wanted him to suffer.

=== Frank Nunn ===
Frank Nunn
- First appearance: "Mr. Monk Takes Manhattan" (Mentioned Only)
- Last appearance: "Mr. Monk Is on the Run (Part One)" "Mr. Monk and the End" (Flashback Only)
- Portrayed by: Courtney Gains (2008)

In-universe information
- Gender: Male

Frank Nunn was a career criminal who was hired by a mysterious figure known as "The Judge" to assassinate Trudy Monk. Nunn hired Warrick Tennyson, an explosives expert, to build and plant the bomb, while Nunn detonated it with a cellular phone. Twelve years later, he was hired to build another bomb, as part of a scheme by Dale Biederbeck, and plant it in the back of a car meant to be ridden by the Governor of California and his wife during his hometown's bicentennial parade. Unknown to Monk, Nunn is also a pawn in a related scheme to frame him for murder and incapacitate him. In "Mr. Monk Takes Manhattan", Warrick Tennyson tells Monk that he was hired to build the bomb which killed Trudy, by a six-fingered man. This six-fingered man detonated the bomb from a distance with a cellular phone.

The season six finale "Mr. Monk Is on the Run" continues the investigation when Monk and Natalie are called to the scene of an electronics store robbery. Several items have been stolen that when combined, can be used to build a bomb, and a crowbar dropped by the thief bears fingerprints from a man with six fingers on his right hand. Monk believes this to be the same man who murdered Trudy.

A note is also left behind which reads: "To Force Heaven Mars Shall Have A New Angel". When Monk decodes the message as saying "247 Marshall Avenue, Angel, California", he goes there alone, taking along his old police-issue pistol. There, he meets Frank Nunn, who recognizes Monk as "the cop with the wife". Frank Nunn shows no remorse. In rage, Monk lunges at him and the two engage in a violent brawl, during which Monk repeatedly kicks and punches Nunn before drawing his pistol and demanding to know who hired him. Before Nunn can answer, he is shot dead by a corrupt local sheriff, John Rollins.

Later he appears to be of some use, as the police find papers in Frank Nunn's apartment connecting Trudy's murder with a mysterious figure known as "The Judge".

=== Judge Ethan Rickover ===
Judge Ethan Rickover (Craig T. Nelson) is a respected former college law professor turned state judge. Prior to his appointment as a judge and Trudy meeting Adrian, Rickover has an extramarital affair with Trudy. The affair resulted in Trudy becoming pregnant with his child. After the baby was born, Rickover covered up the illegitimate child by telling Wendy Stroud, the midwife, to tell Trudy that her baby died about nine minutes after birth and to then put the child up for adoption.

Fourteen years later, in 1997, Rickover is nominated as an appellate court judge. Stroud comes forward claiming she has "found Jesus" and can no longer live with her guilty conscience over what she did. Stroud says she will reveal the truth about his and Trudy's illegitimate child, which would ruin his confirmation chances. Rickover realizes any information regarding these events could be potentially damaging to his political career and has Stroud killed to keep her quiet, burying her body in his backyard.

Around the same time, Rickover hires bomber Frank Nunn to plant a bomb in Trudy's car. Trudy has already suspected that Rickover was involved in Wendy Stroud's death after she read about it in the newspaper. When Trudy is subsequently killed, it is impossible to connect either her death or Stroud's death to Rickover, allowing him to have a prosperous career as a judge. Twelve years later, in 2009, Rickover has come far in his career, having been recently nominated for the California Supreme Court. He still lives in the same house because he knows that Wendy Stroud's body is buried in the yard, marked by a sundial under a tree.

Dr. Malcolm Nash (Ed Begley Jr.), the director of the clinic where Stroud worked, discovers the truth about Trudy's child while digitizing the records from old paper records to computer files. Coincidentally, Nash is earlier questioned by Monk and Stottlemeyer when they got the call that Trudy had been killed. Nash calls Rickover, blackmailing him for information. Panicking, Rickover hires a different professional hit man, Joey Kazarinski, to kill Dr. Nash.

Monk gets involved in the investigation following Dr. Nash's death and is able to uncover evidence at the crime scene linking back to Kazarinski. Rickover finds out about this when Stottlemeyer comes over to his house to sign a warrant to search Kazarinski's premises. Fearing that Monk's involvement in the investigation may ultimately lead back to him, Rickover orders Kazarinski to kill Monk as well. Kazarinski poisons Monk's wipes with a ricin-based synthetic poison that will kill him in a period of two or three days. When Kazarinski gets hit by a train and dies while being chased by Stottlemeyer through a yard, Rickover thinks himself to be cleared of any suspicion. Unbeknownst to him, the day before Trudy was killed, she made a video message to Adrian, explaining how Rickover wanted to meet her in that parking garage, and also mentioning the secret affair.

Having just found out about the video, Monk confronts Rickover and informs him that he knows he was behind Trudy's death, although he has no other evidence to back this up. Eventually, Monk realizes why Rickover refused to move away from his longtime house and confronts Rickover again in his yard as he is returning home, forcing Rickover at gunpoint to dig up Wendy Stroud's body. The body is eventually found, with both Monk and the police present at the scene, and Rickover confesses to the murders of Wendy Stroud and Trudy. During a coughing fit brought on by the poisoned wipes, Monk puts the gun down on the sundial in Rickover's yard, which Rickover then picks up and holds to his own head, yelling "You take care of her!" before pulling the trigger. Because he is the only person left to know that Trudy's child is still alive, no one is able to figure out what exactly he meant by his final statement. Eventually, Monk finds an article, dated the same day that Trudy's illegitimate child was born, detailing how Wendy Stroud saved a child. Adrian is then able to locate Trudy's child, now a grown-up young woman named Molly Evans, who he grows to love as a long-lost stepdaughter.

Rickover first appeared in "Mr. Monk and the End - Part I" and later in "Mr. Monk and the End - Part II".

=== Molly Evans ===
Molly Evans (Alona Tal in the series, Caitlin McGee in Mr. Monk's Last Case) is the illegitimate daughter that Trudy had in her affair with Rickover. She was born January 2, 1983, but was taken from her mother immediately after birth by Wendy Stroud, the midwife, at the behest of Rickover; Trudy was told that the baby had died nine minutes after birth. Stroud then claimed to have found Molly abandoned at a playground and took her to an orphanage. She is eventually adopted by a family and becomes a movie critic for the fictional East Bay Chronicle.

Monk initially believes Molly to be dead, based on the information given to him by Trudy in her video to him. After finding evidence to suggest otherwise, Monk discovers that she is still alive. Monk decides to meet Molly, and the two of them quickly start bonding and forming a friendship. According to Monk, Molly seems to be similar to Trudy not only in appearance but also in her mannerisms. With Molly filling the void that Trudy's death left in his life, Monk initially decides to retire from detective work. However, when Molly reminds Monk that there are other people out there who are going through the same things that he has gone through and that they need his help, he decides to resume his career as a detective. Molly appeared in "Mr. Monk and the End - Part II" and returned in Mr. Monk's Last Case: A Monk Movie.

=== Jared Stottlemeyer ===
Jared Stottlemeyer is Leland's older son who appears in four episodes, always played by different actors to show his aging.

In his first appearance, in "Mr. Monk Goes to the Ballgame", Sharona gets angry at Leland because Jared is too old to be in little league baseball, something Leland is forced to admit. This implies that at one point Jared had to repeat a grade. He was portrayed by Cameron Cush in this episode.

In "Mr. Monk and the Captain's Wife", Monk is forced to take Jared and his brother to lunch because Karen is hospitalized after a tow truck driver is shot and killed by a sniper, causing the truck to veer into Karen's oncoming van, and because Leland is working the homicide case. In this episode, he was portrayed by Jesse James.

The relationship between Leland and Jared was a little difficult after the events of "Mr. Monk and the Captain's Marriage", with Karen divorcing Leland, leaving Leland estranged from their sons. In the season five episode "Mr. Monk Goes to a Rock Concert", Jared skips school to attend the local San Francisco Band Jam concert, forcing Leland to miss work to find him, accompanied by Monk and Natalie. Leland's and Jared's relationship is evidently strained, since the only photo Leland has for the bouncer at the main entrance to the grounds is a photo from a trip to Cabo San Lucas that obviously is several years old. However, Leland's efforts to find Jared are sidetracked when roadie Greg "Stork" Murray turns up dead in a port-a-potty, discovered by Monk and Natalie. Monk and Natalie investigate the murder with help from Stork's girlfriend Kendra Frank (Tamara Feldman), eventually coming to the conclusion that Trafalgar's lead singer Kris Kedder (Brad Hunt) is the killer after Jared identifies a guitar string found at the crime scene as coming from a 12-string guitar, of which Kedder is the only person on the property to own one. As they move to capture an incriminating beachball with air from Kedder's asthma inhaler, the ball lands in the scaffolding for one of the loudspeakers. Jared is about to throw it to his father when Kedder comes up, leaving Jared with the split-decision to either let a killer get away or standing up to his father. After a few tense moments, he throws the ball to Leland, and Randy arrests Kedder. At the end of the episode, Jared and Leland stop at a photo booth so that Leland will have updated photos for the next time he takes off. He was played by Jon Kyle Hansen in this episode.

He makes a brief appearance in "Mr. Monk Is the Best Man", played by Matthew Scott Hill.

== Characters added in the novel series ==
The expanded universe novels written by Lee Goldberg, and later by Hy Conrad, introduce an additional cast of characters. Listed here are characters that exclusively appear in the novels and make multiple appearances:

Joseph "Joe" Cochran: an SFFD firefighter to whom Natalie becomes attracted in a few of the novels. He works out of Fire Station 28, based in North Beach. He first appears in the novel Mr. Monk Goes to the Firehouse when Monk and Natalie are hired by Julie to investigate the death of Joe's pet Dalmatian, a dog named Sparky, killed while Joe and his crew are away responding to a fatal house fire. Natalie begins dating Joe during the investigation, but she dumps him when she realizes she is becoming way too attracted to him.

Joe later appears in Mr. Monk and the Two Assistants when he approaches Natalie, asking Monk to investigate the theft of some firefighting equipment from his firehouse, including a Jaws of Life. While Natalie's sexual attraction to Joe is re-sparked, Monk discovers that the person responsible for the theft was responsible for killing a local shoe salesman named Ronald Webster.

Yuki Nakamura: Ambrose's live-in assistant, then later girlfriend, and eventual wife. She is introduced in Mr. Monk on the Road, when Adrian, Ambrose, and Natalie encounter her accompanying her longtime boss, journalist Dub Clements, on a cross-country RV trip. She moves in with Ambrose after Dub dies from terminal cancer.

Lieutenant Amy Devlin: Stottlemeyer's replacement right-hand following Randy's departure. Her career, as revealed in her first appearance in Mr. Monk on the Road, began in the Vice Division. She spent numerous years working undercover to infiltrate and shut down drug operations. Her career in Vice was ended, though, when a judge refused to let her testify at the trial for her last case without showing her face. Thanks to the job opening caused by Randy's departure from the Homicide division, Devlin was reassigned to the Robbery-Homicide Division.

Devlin is different from Randy in many ways. Among other things, she is less tolerable of Monk's eccentricities and less flexible to accommodating his needs than Randy ever was. However, her life as a former Vice cop does give Devlin some advantages that Randy does not have. For instance, in her breakout role in Mr. Monk on the Couch, Devlin uses herself in a pair of sting operations to catch two different related killers. In the first sting operation, she and Natalie wear mini-dresses to pose as hookers who seduce a crime scene cleaner named William Tong, suspected of assisting his partner Jerry Yermo in the murder of a train engineer named Stuart Hewson over stolen diamonds. They use this to knock Tong out, steal his wallet and car keys, and plant pig's blood on his car to make it look like Tong was killed by Rico Ramirez, an ex-con who has knifed three people in Natalie's neighborhood looking for these very diamonds. The staged crime scene allows Devlin to pressure Tong's co-conspirators Corinne Witt and Gene Tiflin into confessing to their part in the Hewson shooting. Afterwards, Devlin poses as Corinne as part of the second sting, which is to draw Ramirez out of hiding.

Ellen Morse: Monk's new girlfriend. She is introduced in Mr. Monk on Patrol, where she runs a store in Summit called Poop, which (as the store's name suggests) sells dung and other objects made from fecal material. However, she also has obsessive-compulsive disorder and takes a liking to Monk after a couple of encounters. Eventually, by Mr. Monk Gets Even, she moves her business to San Francisco.
