= List of Freeform original films =

This is a list of television films produced for the cable network Freeform and its predecessors, The Family Channel, Fox Family, and ABC Family. The network temporarily stopped making new original films from 2013 until 2016, and again from 2021 to the present. Most films are subsequently released on home video ( indicated with * ).

== The Family Channel ==
=== 1990 ===
Title	Premiere date
Clarence	November 24, 1990

=== 1992 ===
Title	Premiere date
Partners 'n Love	November 27, 1992

=== 1993 ===
Title	Premiere date
Candles in the Dark	December 3, 1993

=== 1994 ===
Title	Premiere date
Race to Freedom: The Underground Railroad	February 19, 1994
Young Indiana Jones and the Hollywood Follies	October 15, 1994
Good King Wenceslas	November 26, 1994
Rugged Gold	December 10, 1994

=== 1995 ===
Title	Premiere date
Young Indiana Jones and the Treasure of the Peacock's Eye	January 15, 1995
Tad	February 12, 1995
Dad, the Angel & Me	March 12, 1995
Young Indiana Jones and the Attack of the Hawkmen	October 8, 1995
Kidnapped	November 5–6, 1995
Hart to Hart: Two Harts in 3/4 Time	November 26, 1995

=== 1996 ===
Title	Premiere date
Stolen Memories: Secrets from the Rose Garden	January 7, 1996
Night of the Twisters	February 18, 1996*
Hart to Hart: Harts in High Season	March 24, 1996
Captains Courageous	April 21, 1996
Young Indiana Jones: Travels with Father	June 16, 1996
Hart to Hart: Till Death Do Us Hart	August 25, 1996
The Wind in the Willows	September 8, 1996
Panic in the Skies!	October 13, 1996*
Apollo 11	November 17, 1996
Christmas Every Day	December 1, 1996
The Angel of Pennsylvania Avenue	December 15, 1996
The Willows in Winter	December 16, 1996

=== 1997 ===
Title	Premiere date
While My Pretty One Sleeps	January 12, 1997
The Ditchdigger's Daughters	February 23, 1997
Dog's Best Friend	March 23, 1997
Lost Treasure of Dos Santos	April 20, 1997
Love-Struck	June 1, 1997
The Call of the Wild: Dog of the Yukon	June 22, 1997
Doomsday Rock	August 24, 1997
Married to a Stranger	September 28, 1997
Mother Teresa: In the Name of God's Poor	October 5, 1997
Let Me Call You Sweetheart	October 26, 1997*
Flood: A River's Rampage	November 16, 1997*
The Christmas List	December 1, 1997

=== 1998 ===
Title	Premiere date
Moonlight Becomes You	January 11, 1998
Loyal Opposition: Terror in the White House	March 8, 1998
Storm Chasers: Revenge of the Twister	May 17, 1998*
The Cowboy and the Movie Star	June 7, 1998
Voyage of Terror	June 20, 1998*
Sweet Deception	August 2, 1998

== Fox Family ==
=== 1998 ===
Title	Premiere date
National Lampoon's Men in White	August 16, 1998*
National Lampoon's Golf Punks	September 6, 1998*
Addams Family Reunion	September 22, 1998*
Earthquake in New York	October 11, 1998*
Casper Meets Wendy	October 27, 1998*
Perfect Little Angels	November 8, 1998*
Like Father, Like Santa	December 1, 1998
Catch Me If You Can	December 11, 1998*

=== 1999 ===
Title	Premiere date
Free Fall	January 8, 1999
Silver Wolf	January 10, 1999
Dangerous Waters	February 7, 1999
Two of Hearts	February 14, 1999
The Darklings	March 17, 1999
Michael Jordan: An American Hero	April 18, 1999
Don't Look Behind You	July 25, 1999
Heaven's Fire	August 7, 1999
Au Pair	August 22, 1999
Storm	September 11, 1999
The Ghosts of Christmas Eve	December 14, 1999

=== 2000 ===
Title	Premiere date
Britannic	January 20, 2000
Ice Angel	March 5, 2000
St. Patrick: The Irish Legend	March 12, 2000
The Spiral Staircase	April 2, 2000
Time Share	June 18, 2000
The Man Who Used to Be Me	July 16, 2000
Rocket's Red Glare	August 27, 2000
Les Miserables	September 4, 2000
A Family In Crisis: The Elian Gonzales Story	September 17, 2000
Final Ascent	November 5, 2000
Special Delivery	December 10, 2000

=== 2001 ===
Title	Premiere date
The Amati Girls	January 9, 2001*
Au Pair II	April 22, 2001*
Till Dad Do Us Part	June 17, 2001
When Good Ghouls Go Bad	October 21, 2001*

== ABC Family ==
=== 2000s ===
==== 2001 ====
Title	Premiere date
Three Days	December 9, 2001*

==== 2002 ====
Title	Premiere date
Mom's on Strike	March 17, 2002
Just a Walk in the Park	August 18, 2002

==== 2003 ====
Title	Premiere date
The One	February 9, 2003
This Time Around	June 22, 2003
Lucky 7	July 20, 2003*
See Jane Date	August 16, 2003*
Beautiful Girl	October 19, 2003
Picking Up & Dropping Off	December 7, 2003

==== 2004 ====
Title	Premiere date
I Want to Marry Ryan Banks	January 18, 2004
Celeste in the City	March 7, 2004
Brave New Girl	April 25, 2004*
Love Rules	June 5, 2004
Crimes of Fashion	July 5, 2004
Pop Rocks	September 10, 2004
The Hollow	October 24, 2004*
Searching for David's Heart	November 21, 2004
Snow	December 13, 2004*

==== 2005 ====
Title	Premiere date
She Gets What She Wants	January 9, 2005*
School of Life	February 19, 2005
I Do, They Don't	March 20, 2005
Kart Racer	April 3, 2005*
Everything You Want	April 17, 2005*
Romy and Michele: In the Beginning	May 30, 2005
Pizza My Heart	July 24, 2005
Campus Confidential	August 21, 2005
Rent Control	September 9, 2005*
Alchemy	October 7, 2005
Shadows in the Sun	November 13, 2005*
Chasing Christmas	December 4, 2005*
Christmas in Boston	December 14, 2005*

==== 2006 ====
Title	Premiere date
If Only	January 15, 2006*
The Cutting Edge: Going for the Gold	March 12, 2006*
Hello Sister, Goodbye Life	April 2, 2006
The Karate Dog	May 29, 2006*
Best Man, Worst Friend	July 9, 2006*
Fallen	2006*
Relative Chaos	September 4, 2006
The Initiation of Sarah	October 22, 2006*
Santa Baby	December 10, 2006*
Christmas Do-Over	December 2006*

==== 2007 ====
Title	Premiere date
Love Wrecked	January 21, 2007*
The Dukes of Hazzard: The Beginning	March 4, 2007*
Big Liar on Campus	September 16, 2007*
Nature of the Beast	October 21, 2007
Christmas Caper	November 25, 2007*
Holiday in Handcuffs	December 9, 2007*
Snowglobe	December 15, 2007*

==== 2008 ====
Title	Premiere date
The Cutting Edge: Chasing the Dream	March 16, 2008*
Princess	April 20, 2008*
The Circuit	June 8, 2008*
Picture This	July 13, 2008*
Samurai Girl	September 2008
Snow 2: Brain Freeze	December 14, 2008*
Christmas in Wonderland	December, 2008*

==== 2009 ====
Title	Premiere date
Au Pair 3: Adventure in Paradise	March 15, 2009*
My Fake Fiancé	April 19, 2009*
Labor Pains	July 19, 2009*
The Dog Who Saved Christmas	November 29, 2009*
Santa Baby 2: Christmas Maybe	December 13, 2009*

=== 2010s ===
==== 2010 ====
Title	Premiere date
The Cutting Edge: Fire and Ice	March 14, 2010*
Beauty & the Briefcase	April 18, 2010*
Revenge of the Bridesmaids	July 18, 2010*
The Dog Who Saved Christmas Vacation	November 28, 2010*
Christmas Cupid	December 13, 2010*

==== 2011 ====
Title	Premiere date
Mean Girls 2	January 23, 2011*
My Future Boyfriend	April 10, 2011*
Cyberbully	July 17, 2011*
Teen Spirit	August 7, 2011*
Desperately Seeking Santa	November 27, 2011
12 Dates of Christmas	December 11, 2011

==== 2012 ====
Title	Premiere date
Home Alone: The Holiday Heist	November 25, 2012*
The Mistle-Tones	December 9, 2012

==== 2013 ====
Title	Premiere date
Lovestruck: The Musical	April 21, 2013
Christmas Bounty	November 26, 2013*
Holidaze	December 8, 2013

== Freeform ==
=== 2010s ===
==== 2016 ====
Title	Premiere date
Holiday Joy	December 6, 2016

==== 2017 ====
Title	Premiere date
Angry Angel	November 27, 2017

==== 2018 ====
Title	Premiere date
The Truth About Christmas	November 25, 2018
Life-Size 2	December 2, 2018
No Sleep 'Till Christmas	December 10, 2018

==== 2019 ====
Title	Premiere date
Turkey Drop	November 23, 2019
Ghosting: The Spirit of Christmas	December 4, 2019
Same Time, Next Christmas	December 5, 2019

=== 2020s ===
==== 2020 ====
Title	Premiere date
The Thing About Harry	February 15, 2020
