= Valentine (TV series) =

Romantic comedy/drama television series

- Genre: Romance; Comedy drama
- Created by: Kevin Murphy
- Starring: Jaime Murray; Kristoffer Polaha; Autumn Reeser; Christine Lakin; Robert Baker; Patrick Fabian; Greg Ellis
- Composers: Gary Chase; Nathan Wang; David Manning
- Country of origin: United States
- Original language: English
- No. of seasons: 1
- No. of episodes: 8

Production
- Executive producers: Kevin Murphy; Courtney Conte
- Producers: Katy Ballard; Joanne Toll
- Running time: 42 minutes
- Production companies: Five & Dime Productions; Media Rights Capital

Original release
- Network: The CW
- Release: October 5, 2008 – July 19, 2009

Valentine is an American romantic comedy-drama television series that aired on The CW and City in Canada from October 5, 2008 to July 19, 2009. The series was created by Kevin Murphy, who also serves as executive producer alongside Courtney Conte. The show was produced by Media Rights Capital and aired on Sundays at 8:00 p.m. On November 20, 2008, CW pulled Valentine along with Easy Money. However, the series returned on Sunday, June 28, 2009, to begin burning-off the remaining unaired episodes. The show's only season averaged 0.72 million viewers and 0.2 demo in Adults 18–49.

== Premise ==
The show focuses on the Valentine family, a group of gods living amongst humans. They must keep their true identities secret as they do whatever it takes to bring soulmates together. In modern times however the gods' methods have become less effective, and unless they improve their matchmaking skills they will end up becoming mortal. As a result, Grace, aka the goddess Aphrodite, has decided to recruit romance novelist Kate Providence to help them adapt their skills. With help from the fates and the Oracle of Delphi, now housed in a hot tub, it is up to the gods and Kate to help bring love back into people's lives.

== Production ==
The show was ordered into production after Media Rights Capital (MRC) took over programming Sunday nights on The CW. The show was originally titled Valentine, Inc. but dropped the "Inc." from the title prior to the fall 2008 television season. The 13-episode first season filmed in the Los Angeles area, with filming primarily taking place at the Los Angeles Centre Studios. The show is filmed on Sound Stage 1, which has previously been used to film Women's Murder Club and also Mad Men.

On October 13, 2008, MRC stopped production on Valentine for 4–6 weeks, due to failure to secure a bridge loan to complete the order. This meant that only eight of the 13 episodes ordered were filmed prior to the hiatus. Two weeks later, MRC canceled both Valentine and Easy Money. On November 20, 2008, The CW announced that it was ending its Sunday Night agreement with MRC, instead programming the night itself.

=== Casting ===
Autumn Reeser, Kristoffer Polaha, and Robert Baker were the first actors announced to join the series on July 15, 2008. Just days after the first announcement on July 18, 2008 The Hollywood Reporter announced that Jaime Murray would also be part of the cast, playing the show's title character Grace Valentine. On July 19, The CW formally announced the shows cast, adding Nikki Snelson, Patrick Fabian and Greg Ellis to the previously announced actors on the show. Prior to production of the pilot Nikki Snelson had to leave the cast due to conflicts with her role in the 2008 tour of A Chorus Line. As a result, Christine Lakin joined the cast, replacing Snelson as romance novelist Kate.

== Cast and characters ==
- Grace Valentine (portrayed by Jaime Murray):

Family matriarch and the goddess Aphrodite. Grace oversees the Valentines' Earthly operations and is the one to bring Kate on board after she discovers that their lack of success has made them start to become mortal. She was recently involved in a relationship with her former husband Ray Howard, the god Hephaestus. She left him for Ari thousands of years ago, and has regretted the decision ever since: suffering psychological abuse, and unable to get a divorce. She tells Kate that Ray is the only man she has every truly loved, and she considers Ari nothing more than a fling. She is attacked by the Egyptian Goddess Bastet, who wields the Adamantium Blade, after Bastet fatally stabs Ari. She is last seen weeping over Ari's body.

- Danny Valentine (portrayed by Kristoffer Polaha):

The god of erotic love, Eros and son of Grace. Danny is the loose cannon amongst the Valentines and spends his nights seducing the ladies. His classic bow and arrow has now been replaced by a gun, which shoots magic to help create feelings of love in his targets. However, his gun was destroyed by Grace who has gotten fed up with his behavior. He was initially resistant to the idea of Kate joining their operation, but has begun to warm up to her, even to the point of having a slight crush (whether he knows it or not). He eventually marries Kate in order to bring two former lovers together, as one is a wedding planner and the other is a rabbi. However, he kisses her with passion, indicating that he has developed feelings for her.

- Phoebe Valentine (portrayed by Autumn Reeser):

The Titan Phoebe. Phoebe serves as the Goddess of the Oracle at Delphi. Phoebe is much older than the other gods, but being a Titan means her soul has been reborn many times, hence her childlike nature. It is she who communicates with The Fates to match soul mates and also sees what will happen if they don't find one another. She is immediately suspicious of Kate's motivations, but her concerns aren't taken seriously after she openly shows jealousy towards her. She seems to harbor a crush on Leo and was happy when he told her he would marry her if she was still single by the time she was 80.

- Kate Providence (portrayed by Christine Lakin):

A mortal romance novelist. Kate is brought into the Valentines' world after meeting Grace at a book reading. At first resistant to the idea of the Greek gods being on Earth, a display of magic from Grace soon convinces her the gods are real, and she chooses to help them reunite soul mates. However, Phoebe begins receiving signs from the Oracle that Kate has more sinister intentions, and it has been suggested that she kills Grace at some point in the near future. However, it is revealed that the woman Phoebe saw was in fact the Egyptian Goddess Bastet, who had been hiding in the Valentine house in her cat form. Kate eventually marries Danny in order to bring two former lovers together, as one is a wedding planner and the other is a rabbi. However, she kisses him with passion, indicating that she has feelings for him.

- Leo Francisci (portrayed by Robert Baker):

A bartender and the hero Hercules. Leo is the moral compass for Danny and an all around good person. He assists the Valentines on their mission to bring love to the world, acting as the muscle of the group, and he destroys Danny's love gun after Grace orders him to. Phoebe convinces him to help her discover Kate's true intentions, but comes to regret it after they accidentally start a fire in Kate's apartment. He seems to have a crush on Phoebe and is very protective of her. He is injured by the Adamantium Blade when he is protecting Grace from the Goddess Bastet.

- Ray Howard (portrayed by Patrick Fabian):

A handyman who is also known as the god Hephaestus. Ray is Grace's ex-husband from an arranged marriage. Grace cheated on him frequently and married one of her lovers, Ari. Ray and Grace recently had an affair, but he broke up with Grace when he realized she couldn't choose between Ari and himself. After Danny discovers the affair, he convinces Ray to repair his love gun so her can use it to drive Grace into leaving Ari, not knowing that Ari threatened to hurt him if Grace ever tried to get a divorce. He makes a chink in Ari's armor and eventually finds the Adamantium Blade, and hides its discovery from Ari. After the Goddess Bastet ambushed him and stole the blade, he told Ari and warned him about the chink in his armor.

- Ari Valentine (portrayed by Greg Ellis):

A very high-powered man who is also known as the god Ares. Ari is Grace's second and current husband (formerly her lover). Grace cheated on her first husband Ray frequently with Ari and eventually married him. He knows that Ray and Grace have recently had an affair, but he also cheats on her as well. When Grace threatens to leave Ari, he threatened to hurt Ray if Grace ever tried to get a divorce. He warned Danny about evil coming after the gods and tells him that the one blade that can hurt the gods, the Adamantine Blade. He convinced him to get his love gun fixed in order to protect the gods. He found out that Circe held the Blade and attacked her when she tried to summon the titans. After the Goddess Bastet ambushed Ray and stole the blade, he told Ari, who decides to go after her. He is warned about the chink in his armor but doesn't listen. He eventually finds Bastet and the blade, and they eventually begin to fight. Grace calls out his name in fear, which distracts him, letting Bastet fatally wound him.

- Jezebel (portrayed by Noa Tishby):

Jezebel is Kate's seemingly ordinary housecat. In the first few episodes, she exhibits strange behavior, such as intently watching Ari and Kate make out and leaping into the air to knock over a candle, setting Kate's apartment on fire. It was eventually revealed that Jezebel is actually the Egyptian goddess Bastet, who has been planning on murdering Grace and other gods using the Adamantine Blade. After Phoebe becomes suspicious of Kate, she steals some hair off of Kate's sweater that was actually Jezebel's and the Oracle sends her a vision of Grace lying dead on a table. Afterwards, Bastet returned and poured something into the Oracle. In human form, she knocks out Danny and steals his love gun, and uses it to overpower Ray and steal the blade. After arriving at the Valentine Estate, she is confronted by Ari and fatally stabs him.

- Aunt Circe (portrayed by Ann Magnuson):

Danny's Aunt who is also known as the god Circe. She is a goddess and an oracle as well. She is well known for turning men into pigs. She currently makes her income by selling weed. She seems to have had a sexual relationship with Danny. She seems to have her own agenda, as she held the Adamantine Blade and didn't tell the gods about it. Ari eventually found out and attacked her as she tried to summon the titans.

== Episodes ==
No.	Title	Directed by	Written by	Original release date	US viewers (millions)
1	"Valentine"	Kevin Dowling	Kevin Murphy	October 5, 2008	1.146
The Greek gods have set up base in Los Angeles, disguised as the Valentine family. However, they haven't had as much success as they would like, and family matriarch Grace reveals that their failures have begun to cost them their immortality. In order to learn how to bring people together in the modern age, Grace brings a successful romance novelist named Kate into the mix. While the rest of the family isn't keen on the idea, they must accept her help in bringing a spark of romance into the relationship of two longtime best friends. Problem is, she has begun seeing her sleazy ex-boyfriend, who may ruin her chances at finding true love. Guest stars: Lauren Cohan and Mike Faiola
2	"Daddy's Home"	Kevin Dowling	Kevin Murphy & Jennifer Schuur	October 12, 2008	1.020
Grace's affair with Ray is put on hold when her husband, Ari, the god of war, returns home. But Ari hasn't come back for her; He's there to persuade Danny to work for him instead of Grace, as he deems love to be an unprofitable business. Things take a wrong turn after Ari shows an interest in Kate, and Danny decides to bring them together for his own amusement. Elsewhere, the Valentines try to bring a perfume chemist together with his soul mate, an employee at her family's restaurant. This is easier said than done, however, as she is obligated to take part in an arranged marriage with a man she has never met. Guest stars: Greg Ellis, Tejal Shah, Johnathan McClain, and Marshall Manesh
3	"Act Naturally"	John Putch	John J. Sakmar & Kerry Lenhart	October 19, 2008	0.743
After fallen starlet Vivi Langdon crashes her car into a struggling theater while drunk, the Valentines use their supernatural abilities to get the judge to give her a sentence of community service at the theater. Why? Because the fates have named the theater's owner as her soul mate and last chance at happiness. Vivi is resistant to cooperating with her sentence, however, making it difficult for the Valentines to do their job. On top of all of this, Phoebe's mistrust of Kate has only heightened, and she convinces Leo to help her break into Kate's apartment, with devastating results. Guest stars: Holly Valance, Larry Poindexter, and Ryan Devlin
4	"The Book of Love"	David Warren	Phoef Sutton	October 26, 2008	0.847
Grace sends Phoebe to reignite passion between two former independent bookstore owners whose lives have now been almost nearly consumed by the stress of the corporate world. This isn't the only obstacle, as Phoebe's attempts to bring them back together lead to an unintended hookup. Meanwhile, Ari alerts Danny that there might be enemy forces plotting against the family, which leads to the family to ask for Ray's help. Ray, however, is skeptical about the situation, since he does not trust Ari, and is also frightened by the possibility of Ari finding out that he is having an affair with his wife. Guest stars: Seana Kofoed and David Burke
5	"Summer Nights"	Fred Gerber	Melissa Byer & Treena Hancock	June 28, 2009	0.592
The fates reveal a personal trainer and nutritionist are destined to be together, so Grace hires them to work with her at the mansion. Things don't go smoothly when Kate reveals that she previously had a relationship with the personal trainer, and after a drunken evening together, he rejects his soul mate to try to revive his relationship with Kate. Meanwhile Ari convinces Danny to find his love gun, telling him that there are forces that want the gods dead, starting with Grace. Danny is also told about an intricate safe that Ray built for Grace long ago, which is where the gun is likely hidden. Guest stars: Wynn Everett and Aaron Hill
6	"Hound Dog"	Bob Berlinger	Coleman Herbert	July 5, 2009	0.571
A dog comes in the way of true love for a fated couple, leading Kate and Danny to seek the help of Aunt Circe. Ari is also seeking out Circe, to confront her of the recent events that have befalling the Valentines. Guest stars: Ana Gasteyer and Joshua Malina
7	"She's Gone"	Kevin Dowling	Dan Studney	July 12, 2009	0.647
The disappearance of Aunt Circe leaves the Valentines on edge. Meanwhile The fates lead the Valentines to a teen couple separated by college. In order to reunite the pair, Leo and Grace embark on a road trip, while Kate, Danny and Phoebe gatecrash a dorm party. Guest stars: Alyssa Diaz and Rob Mayes
8	"Only God Knows"	John Whitesell	Kevin Murphy & Flint Wainess	July 19, 2009	0.467
Grace stages a fake wedding to bring together a rabbi and a wedding planner. Ray tries to return the Adamantine Blade to Hades, but is intercepted by the goddess Bastet who uses the blade to kill Ari. Guest stars: Wynter Kullman, Noa Tishby, and Heather Ankeny

Notes

- "Summer Nights" was originally slated to air on November 2, 2008, and was advertised as such on the CW following the broadcast of "The Book of Love". At the last minute, the episode was pulled and replaced with a rerun. This coincided with the announcement that Media Rights Capital would be taking a 4–6 week break in filming to catch up on writing scripts. The show ultimately did not resume production. The four remaining episodes of Valentine were aired in the summer of 2009.

=== International airings ===
Valentine aired in South Africa on Pay-TV operator DStv, beginning January 2010. All 8 episodes were aired in Australia on Network 10 in 2010, late on Friday nights.
