= Phoef Sutton =

American writer & producer (born 1958)

Robert Christopher "Phoef" Sutton (born September 11, 1958) is an American writer and producer. His film credits include Mrs. Winterbourne and The Fan, both released in 1996. Phoef — the first name that he uses both personally and professionally — is pronounced "feef", and was a childhood nickname given to him in infancy by his brothers.

Sutton was born in Washington, D.C. and grew up in Virginia. A 1981 graduate of James Madison University, he began his career writing scripts for Newhart. He later became a writer for and executive producer of Cheers. He collaborated with Bob Newhart again on the 1992 TV series Bob and worked as a creative consultant on 1990s TV series Almost Perfect and NewsRadio. With Mark Jordan Legan he wrote and produced the cult comedy series Thanks about the Pilgrims' first years in America and co-wrote a 2017 episode of Kevin Can Wait. He was also the showrunner and producer for the NBC series The Fighting Fitzgeralds and the American version of Coupling. In 1999, he published the novel Always Six O'Clock. In 2012, he published the novel The Dead Man: The Midnight Special and The Dead Man: Reborn. In May 2015, his novel Fifteen Minutes to Live was published by Brash Books. His other novels include Crush, and the two sequels Heart Attack & Vine and Colorado Boulevard, as well as two books co-authored with Janet Evanovich: Wicked Charms and Curious Minds.

From 2005 to 2009, Sutton was a consulting producer for Boston Legal. In 2010, Sutton became a staff writer on the FX series Terriers starring Donal Logue. He was also a writer and consulting producer for the Rob Schneider sitcom Rob, the SyFy Channel series Defiance, and the showrunner and writer for the TV Land original sitcom The Soul Man. He is an adviser to the American Shakespeare Center.

From 2017 to 2019, he created, wrote and produced the Darrow & Darrow series of four Hallmark movies starring Kimberly Williams-Paisley as idealistic lawyer Claire Darrow and Tom Cavanagh as Miles Strasburg, the Assistant District Attorney. Over that same period he also wrote two Emma Fielding Mystery movies for the network. In 2020, took over as executive producer of Hallmark's hit series Chesapeake Shores for its final two seasons.

In 2026, became a writer & executive producer of the mystery series You're Killing Me starring Brooke Shields, Amalia Williamson, and Tom Cavanagh, with whom he worked on Darrow & Darrow. The six-episode first season premiered in May 2026 as the highest rated series in the history of Acorn, which immediately renewed the show for a second season, to air in Spring 2027. He co-wrote episodes of the show with fellow writer-executive producer Lee Goldberg, who also co-authored books with Janet Evanovich.
