= David Clayton Rogers =

American actor

- Born: October 21, 1977 (age 49); Atlanta, Georgia, U.S.
- Other name: David Rogers
- Occupations: Actor; writer; film producer
- Years active: 2002–present
- Spouse: Sally Pressman (m. 2011)
- Children: 2

David Clayton Rogers (born October 21, 1977) is an American actor, writer, and film producer. He has co-starred in films such as Sublime and Dark Ride. Rogers began his acting career in the made-for-television film Bloody Sunday, followed by an appearance on The WB's Gilmore Girls. In early 2004, he joined the cast of the drama series NY-LON. In 2010, he co-starred in the ABC Family Original Movie Revenge of the Bridesmaids with Joanna Garcia.

Rogers has produced two short films: 2006's Following Abraham and 2009's Skylight, which he also wrote and appeared in.

== Personal life ==
Rogers was born in Atlanta, Georgia, the son of Carolyn Mapp Hewes and E. Paul Rogers Jr., who was the owner and president of the Dorsey Alston Realty Company. On October 19, 2010, he became engaged to actress Sally Pressman. The couple met at Lesly Kahn's Acting Studio. The couple married on September 17, 2011. On October 6, 2012, it was announced they were expecting their first child, who was born in April 2013. He is Paul Rudd’s cousin.

== Filmography ==
=== Film ===
Year	Title	Role
2015	Uncanny	Adam
2010	Blast Off	Dave
2010	Revenge of the Bridesmaids	Henry Kent
2009	Skylight	Darkness (also produced and wrote)
2007	Border Patrol	Rock Hayes
2007	Sublime	Billy
2006	Dark Ride	Steve
2002	O Beautiful	Andy
2019	Bixler High Private Eye	Jack Finn

=== Television ===
Year	Title	Role	Notes
2002	O Beautiful	Andy	Made-for-television movie
2002	Bloody Sunday	Dennis	Made-for-television movie
2003	Boys Life 4: Four Play	Andy	Guest star
2004	NY-LON	Luke	Series regular
2004	Gilmore Girls	Trevor	Guest star
2005	The Locrian Mode	Jack	Guest star
2005	Law & Order: Trial by Jury	Ted Hear	Guest star
2006	Cold Case	Davie	Guest star
2006	The Legend of Butch & Sundance	Butch Cassidy	Made-for-television movie
2007	Numb3rs	Santee/Steffen Cavani	Guest star
2007	CSI: NY	Campbell	Guest star
2007	Ghost Whisperer	Eric Sanborn, John Richmond, Oscar Hodges, Richard Ward	Guest star
2007	Brothers & Sisters	Jom Lewis	Guest star
2007	Demons	Conrad David	Made-for-television movie
2007	CSI: Crime Scene Investigation	Bruce Ortolani	Guest star
2008	Austin Golden Hour	Ash Baker	Made-for-television movie
2008	Shark	Brody Miller	Guest star
2009, 2010	Cougar Town	Matt	Guest star
2010	The Pregnancy Pact	Brady Leary	Made-for-television movie
2011	H+: The Digital Series	Kenneth Lubahn	Series regular
2012	Underbelly	Martine	Pilot
2012	Grimm	Arthur Jarvis	Guest star
2012	Happy Endings	Sean	Guest star
2012	Jane by Design	Ben Quimby	Series regular
2013	Back in the Game	Jack	Guest star
2013	Nashville	Jason	Guest star
2014	Mixology	Jim	Guest star
2015	Castle	Viggo Jansen	Guest star
2016	Major Crimes	Craig Conley	Guest star
2019	Mayans M.C.	Marlon Buksar	Guest star
2020	Blindspot	Ice Cream	Episode “Fire & Brimstone”
2020	One Day at a Time	Sebastian	Episode “Checking Boxes”
2021	Leverage: Redemption	Chad Deihle	Episode “The Unwellness Job”
2024	Abbott Elementary	Willard “Willy” R. Abbott V	Episode “Willard R. Abbott”
