= Heart of the Storm =

Heart of the Storm may refer to:

- Heart of the Storm (The Lost World)
- Heart of the Storm (film)

== See also ==
- To the Heart of the Storm, an autobiographical graphic novel by Will Eisner
