= You're Killing Me (2026 TV series) =

2026 mystery television series

- Genre: Crime; Comedy drama; Mystery
- Created by: Robin Bernheim
- Written by: Robin Bernheim; Derek Thompson; Lee Goldberg; Phoef Sutton
- Directed by: James Genn; Paul Fox; Scott Smith; Cory Bowles
- Starring: Brooke Shields; Amalia Williamson; Tom Cavanagh
- Composer: Alexandra Petkovski
- Countries of origin: United States; Canada
- Original language: English
- No. of seasons: 1
- No. of episodes: 6

Production
- Executive producers: Robin Bernheim; Brooke Shields; James Genn; Michael Volpe; Christina Jennings; Scott Garvie; Lee Goldberg; Phoef Sutton; Derek Thompson
- Production locations: Halifax, Nova Scotia; Chester, Nova Scotia; Lunenberg, Nova Scotia; Toronto, Ontario; Hamilton, Ontario; Brantford, Ontario; Orangeville, Ontario
- Production companies: Topsail Entertainment; Shaftesbury

Original release
- Network: AcornTV
- Release: 18 May 2026 – present

You're Killing Me is an American-Canadian mystery comedy-drama television series created by Robin Bernheim and starring Brooke Shields, Amalia Williamson, and Tom Cavanagh. The series premiered on Acorn TV on May 18, 2026.

On May 28, 2026, it was announced that the series had been renewed for a second 6-episode season. Filming for Season 2 is scheduled to run from early September through mid-November 2026 in the greater Toronto area.

Acorn TV said that during its first ten days the program had become the service's number-one series launch to date in subscriber acquisition and viewership.

== Synopsis ==
You're Killing Me follows bestselling mystery novelist Allison "Allie" Chandler (Shields), who teams with aspiring writer and podcaster Andrea "Andi" Walker (Williamson) to investigate murders in the fictional Maine town of Founders' Cove, while Cavanagh plays Jack Kerrigan, the town's police detective.

The first season also followed Allie's developing relationship with Jack and Andi's search for information about her mother, who disappeared when Andi was a child.

== Development ==
Acorn TV announced the series in April 2025 under the working title Allie & Andi. The six-episode project was created and written by Robin Bernheim, with Shields attached to star and executive produce.

Shields and Bernheim had previously worked together on the Netflix film Mother of the Bride. Shields later said that she and Bernheim wanted to build a mystery around two women from different generations: "That dynamic, mixed with a little heat and a bit of the odd couple, can be mined for a great deal of humor and really touching moments."

The Television Academy's emmy magazine described You're Killing Me as part of Acorn TV's emphasis on "cozy" mysteries. Shields cited Matlock, Only Murders in the Building, and Murder, She Wrote as examples of the lighter mystery tone she favored.

By August 2025, the series was retitled You're Killing Me , with Williamson and Cavanagh joining Shields in the principal cast. Production began the following month in Nova Scotia.

Bernheim previously worked with two members of the You're Killing Me writing and producing team on different Hallmark shows. She co-created the Mystery 101 film series with executive producer and writer Lee Goldberg and she worked with executive producer & writer Derek Thompson on the long-running series When Calls the Heart..

The Hallmark connections on the series don't end there. You're Killing Me executive producer & writer Phoef Sutton wrote and created the Darrow & Darrow series of mystery movies, which aired on Hallmark Movies & Mysteries between 2017 and 2019, and featured Tom Cavanagh in the lead role of Assistant District Attorney Miles Strasburg.

== Cast ==
=== Main ===
- Brooke Shields as Allison "Allie" Chandler, a bestselling mystery novelist who becomes an amateur investigator
- Amalia Williamson as Andrea "Andi" Walker, an aspiring writer and podcaster who becomes Allie's investigative partner
- Tom Cavanagh as Jack Kerrigan, the new lead detective in Founders' Cove

== Episodes ==
=== Series overview ===
Season	Episodes	Originally aired		Broadcaster
Season	Episodes	First aired	Last aired	Broadcaster
1	6	18 May 2026	22 June 2026	Acorn TV
2	6	TBD	TBD	Acorn TV

=== Season 1 (2026) ===
No. overall	No. in season	Title	Directed by	Written by	Original release date
1	1	"The Beginning"	James Genn	Robin Bernheim	May 18, 2026
2	2	"The Wedding"	James Genn	Robin Bernheim	May 25, 2026
3	3	"The Copycat"	Scott Smith	Derek Thompson	June 1, 2026
4	4	"The Front Window"	Scott Smith	Lee Goldberg and Phoef Sutton	June 8, 2026
5	5	"The Perfect Alibi"	Paul Fox	Derek Thompson	June 15, 2026
6	6	"The Road Trip"	Paul Fox	Lee Goldberg and Phoef Sutton	June 22, 2026

=== Season 2 (2027) ===
No. overall	No. in season	Title	Directed by	Written by	Original release date
7	1	"The Captive"	James Genn	Robin Bernheim	TBD
8	2	"The Art Show"	James Genn	Lee Goldberg & Phoef Sutton	TBD
9	3	"The Amulet"	Paul Fox	Robin Bernheim	TBD
10	4	"The Play"	Cory Bowles	Derek Thompson	TBD
11	5	"The Sister"	Paul Fox	Derek Thompson	TBD
12	6	"The Sacrifice"	Cory Bowles	Lee Goldberg & Phoef Sutton	TBD

== Reception ==
Yvonne Villarreal of the Los Angeles Times discussed the series in the context of Shields' career and its treatment of aging, relevance, and the relationship between women from different generations.

Matt Roush of TV Insider described the program as a light mystery series and compared Allie's tendency to encounter murders to Jessica Fletcher in Murder, She Wrote, while noting the initially contentious partnership between Allie and Andi.

Lucy Mangan of The Guardian gave the series two stars, calling it "thin, lazy and so disappointing," while adding that it "has just enough charm... that I greet the news that it has been commissioned for a second series with hope rather than despair."

Nathalie Whittle of Good Housekeeping praised the show as "unmissable viewing" and said it was "as good as Bookish and Death Valley combined. If it sounds too good to be true, you'll be pleased to know it's not as You’re Killing Me is the new detective drama that delivers exactly that." She praised humor, the mysteries, and the relationship between the two leads.

In his Stream It or Skip It review for Decider, Joel Keller recommends viewers Stream It, stating that "the mysteries themselves are secondary to the chemistry between the main characters... We really enjoyed Shields and Williamson together when they got down to either working on the investigation or were talking about personal matters."

TV Fanatic praised Shields' "triumphant comedic return to TV," noting that "her chemistry with Amalia Williams as Andrea 'Andi' Walker works immediately. They already feel like old friends... Frankly, the worst part of this series is that it’s only six episodes long."
