= Ashley Williams (actress) =

American actress (born 1978)

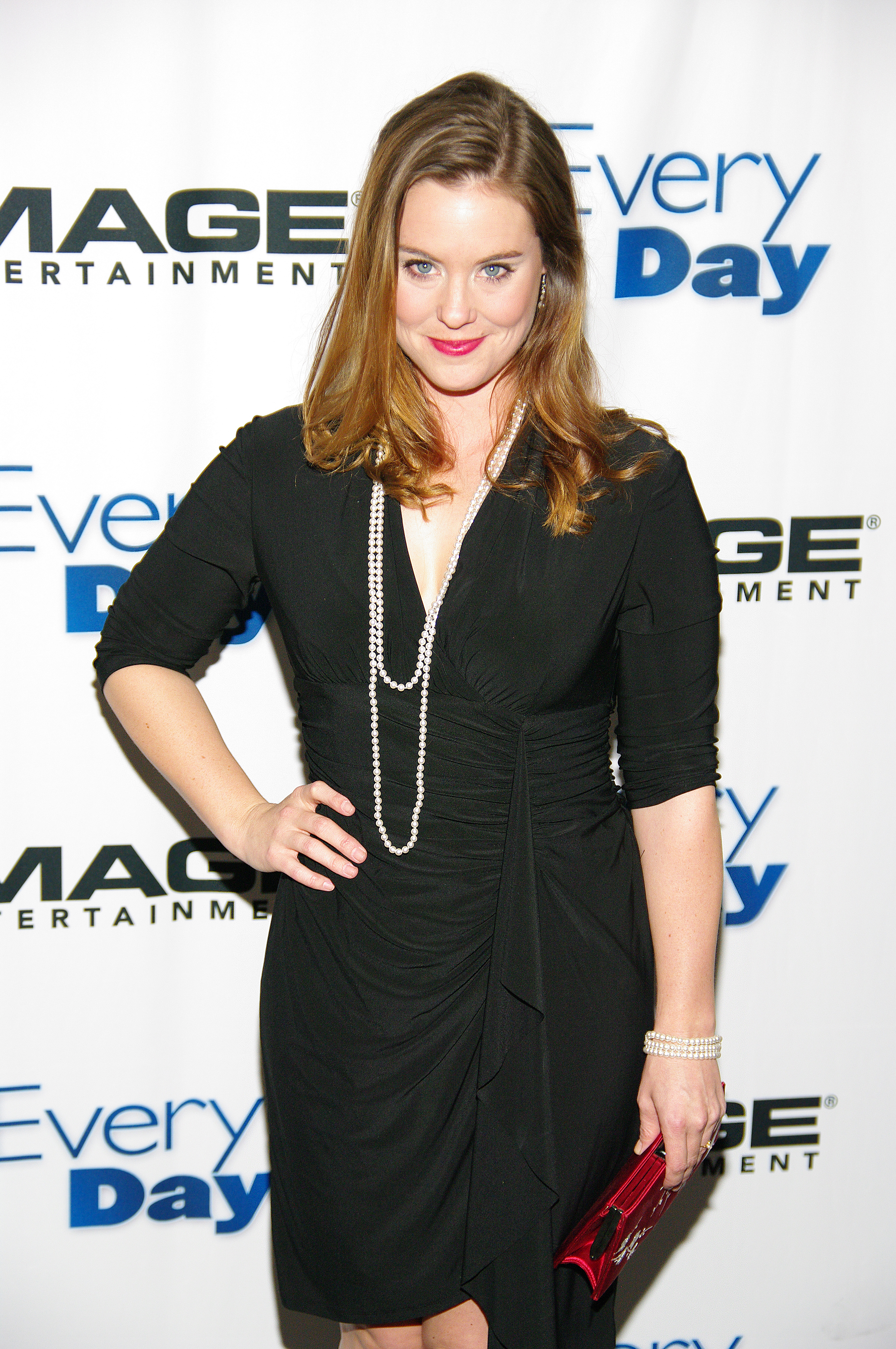
- Williams in 2011
- Born: Ashley Churchill Williams; November 12, 1978 (age 48); Westchester County, New York, U.S.
- Education: Boston University (BFA)
- Occupation: Actress
- Years active: 1993–present
- Known for: Good Morning, Miami
- Spouse: Neal Dodson (m. 2011)
- Children: 2
- Relatives: Kimberly Williams-Paisley (sister); Brad Paisley (brother-in-law)
- Website: ashleywilliams.work

Ashley Churchill Williams (born November 12, 1978) is an American actress. She is known for starring in the television series The Jim Gaffigan Show on TV Land and in the NBC series Good Morning Miami. Williams played Victoria in 15 episodes of the CBS series How I Met Your Mother opposite Josh Radnor. She has starred in more than a dozen television pilots and done over 150 episodes of television in addition to television movies for The Hallmark Channel, Lifetime Television, and ABC Family. She has worked in studio and independent films, regional theater, Off-Broadway, and on Broadway.

== Early life and education ==
Williams was born in Westchester County, New York, the daughter of Linda Barbara, and Gurney Williams III, a freelance health and science writer. She is the younger sister of actress Kimberly Williams-Paisley and is sister-in-law to country music star Brad Paisley.

Williams attended Rye High School in Rye, New York.. In May 2001 she received her Bachelor of Fine Arts from the Boston University College of Fine Arts School of Theatre.

== Career ==
Williams made her acting debut in a non-speaking role in the 1993 drama Indian Summer, which also featured her sister Kimberly. She then spent from 1994 to 1996 playing teenage Danielle Andropoulos on the soap opera As the World Turns.

Williams starred in the television series Good Morning, Miami (2002–2004). Since then she has also appeared in an episode of Psych, multiple episodes of How I Met Your Mother, multiple episodes of E-Ring, multiple episodes of Huff, Law & Order: Special Victims Unit, multiple episodes of Side Order of Life, The Mentalist, Monk, CSI: Crime Scene Investigation, Royal Pains, multiple episodes of Saving Grace, Love Bites, The Protector, Retired at 35, and multiple episodes of Warehouse 13. Williams also had a guest-starring role on American Dreams, playing singer Sandie Shaw and performing Shaw's 1964 hit "(There's) Always Something There to Remind Me" on American Bandstand.

In 2007, she starred in the Off Broadway play Burleigh Grime$ and appeared as Victoria, a cupcake baker, on six episodes of the television series How I Met Your Mother; a role she reprised in the concluding seasons of the show.

In 2010, she starred in the made-for-TV Lifetime movies, Patricia Cornwell's The Front and At Risk, which premiered on the channel on April 17, 2010.

In 2011 and 2012, she played the role of Claire in a film adaptation of Something Borrowed opposite Kate Hudson, John Krasinski, and her college roommate Ginnifer Goodwin, and she also reprised her role as Victoria on How I Met Your Mother.

She made her Broadway debut in John Grisham's A Time to Kill playing law student Ellen Roarke, on September 28, 2013, with the opening night on October 20, 2013. She had previously worked at the Williamstown Theater Festival, and also worked as the understudy for both Rachel Weisz and Gretchen Mol opposite Paul Rudd in the world premiere Off-Broadway production of Neil LaBute's play The Shape of Things. She performed both lead female roles multiple times during the run.

In 2015 and 2016, Williams starred as a fictionalized version of comedian Jim Gaffigan's real life wife in The Jim Gaffigan Show on Comedy Central, a sitcom about a couple raising their five young children in a two-bedroom New York City apartment which also starred Michael Ian Black and Adam Goldberg.

She wrote, directed, and starred in a short film, Meats, about a pregnant vegan who wrestles with her newfound craving for meat. It was shown at the Sundance Film Festival in January 2020.

== Personal life ==
Williams married independent film producer Neal Dodson on May 29, 2011. They have two sons, Gus, born October 5, 2014 and Odie Sal, born May 17, 2017. In the summer of 2016, Williams was two months pregnant when she suffered a miscarriage. She partnered with the Human Development Project to speak publicly about the experience, in hopes of reducing the stigma of miscarriage and encouraging more women to talk openly about it. Williams is a certified birth doula.

== Filmography ==
Film
| Year | Title | Role | Notes |
|---|---|---|---|
| 2004 | The List | | Short film |
| 2007 | Numero Dos | Ashleigh | Short film |
| 2009 | The Eight Percent | Laura | Short film |
| 2010 | Heterosexuals | Rhonda | |
| 2011 | Scents and Sensibility | Elinor Dashwood | |
| 2011 | Margin Call | Heather Burke | |
| 2011 | Something Borrowed | Claire | |
| 2012 | Hearing Voices | | Short film |
| 2013 | Sequin Raze | Rebecca | Short film |
| 2014 | Lovesick | Felicia | |
| 2014 | A Most Violent Year | Lange | |
| 2016 | Six LA Love Stories | Robin Butterman | |
| 2020 | Meats | Lane | Short film; wrote and directed |

Television
| Year | Title | Role | Notes |
|---|---|---|---|
| 1994–1996 | As the World Turns | Danielle Andropoulos | Recurring role |
| 2002 | Dawson's Creek | Lory Glory | Episode: "Swan Song" |
| 2002–2004 | Good Morning, Miami | Dylan Messinger | Main role, 39 episodes |
| 2003 | American Dreams | Sandie Shaw | Episode: "High Hopes" |
| 2004 | Snow | Sandy Brooks | Television film (ABC) |
| 2005 | Monk | Darlene Coolidge / Theresa Scott | Episode: "Mr. Monk Goes to a Wedding" |
| 2005–2006 | E-Ring | Beth Wilkerson | Recurring role, 6 episodes |
| 2006 | Amy Coyne | Amy Coyne | Television film (Fox) |
| 2006 | Huff | Alyssa | Recurring role, 8 episodes |
| 2006 | Him and Us | Nina | Television film (ABC) |
| 2006–2014 | How I Met Your Mother | Victoria | Recurring role (seasons 1, 7–9), 15 episodes |
| 2007 | Imperfect Union | Ronnie | Television film (TBS) |
| 2007 | Making It Legal | Julie | Television film (ABC) |
| 2007 | Psych | Trish Connors | Episode: "Forget Me Not" |
| 2007 | Montana Sky | Willa Mercy | Television film (Lifetime) |
| 2007 | Law & Order: Special Victims Unit | Laura Kozlowski | Episode: "Haystack" |
| 2007 | Side Order of Life | Becca | Main role |
| 2008 | Night Life | Jenny | Television film (Fox) |
| 2008 | Snow 2: Brain Freeze | Sandy Brooks | Television film (ABC Family) |
| 2008 | Novel Adventures | Lizzie McKenzie | 8 episodes |
| 2009–2010 | Saving Grace | Amanda Dewey | Recurring role, 5 episodes |
| 2010 | The New Adventures of Old Christine | Store Clerk Amy | Episode: "Sweet Charity" |
| 2010 | At Risk | Stump | Television film (Lifetime) |
| 2010 | The Front | Stump | Television film (Lifetime) |
| 2010 | Untitled Adam Carolla Project | N/A | Unsold television pilot |
| 2011 | Retired at 35 | Lilah Fabricant | "Stuck in the Meddle" |
| 2011 | Bird Dog | Gail McGrath | Television film (TNT) |
| 2011 | Love Bites | Bridget | Episode: "Too Much Information" |
| 2011 | The Protector | N/A | Episode: "Rats" |
| 2011 | Warehouse 13 | Sally Stukowski | 4 episodes |
| 2011 | The Mentalist | Anna Dugan | Episode: "The Redshirt" |
| 2012 | The Wedding Band | Denise | Episodes: "End of the World as We Know It", "99 Problems" |
| 2012 | CSI: Crime Scene Investigation | Debbie Hicks | Episode: "Stealing Home" |
| 2012 | Royal Pains | Sydney Bartlett | Episodes: "You Give Love a Bad Name", "About Face" |
| 2013 | Christmas in the City | Wendy Carroll | Television film (Lifetime) |
| 2014 | The Good Wife | Christina Barrett | Episode: "We, the Juries" |
| 2015–2016 | The Jim Gaffigan Show | Jeannie Gaffigan | Main role, 2 seasons |
| 2015 | October Kiss | Poppy Summerall | Television film (Hallmark) |
| 2016 | Love on a Limb | Aimie Roarke | Television film (Hallmark) |
| 2017 | Girls | Ginny | Episode: "All I Ever Wanted" |
| 2017 | Christmas in Evergreen | Allie Shaw | Television film (Hallmark) |
| 2018 | Instinct | Nora Cecchino | Episode: "Wild Game" |
| 2018 | FBI | Alexis Moran | Episode: "Family Man" |
| 2018 | Christmas in Evergreen: Letters to Santa | Allie Shaw | Television film (Hallmark) |
| 2018 | Northern Lights of Christmas | Zoey Hathaway | Television film (Hallmark Movies & Mysteries) |
| 2019 | Holiday Hearts | Peyton | Television film (Hallmark Movies & Mysteries) |
| 2019 | Christmas in Evergreen: Tidings of Joy | Allie Shaw | Television film (Hallmark) |
| 2020 | Chris Watts: Confession of a Killer | Shan'Ann Watts | Television film (Lifetime) |
| 2020 | Never Kiss a Man in a Christmas Sweater | Maggie O’Donnell | Television film (Hallmark) |
| 2021 | The Good Doctor | Hannah Palmer | Episode: "The Uncertainty Principle" |
| 2021 | Sister Swap: A Hometown Holiday | Meg | Television film (Hallmark) |
| 2021 | Sister Swap: Christmas in the City | Meg | Television film (Hallmark) |
| 2022 | Two Tickets to Paradise | Hannah Holt | Television film (Hallmark) |
| 2022 | Amber Brown | Aunt Pam | Main role |
| 2022 | Five More Minutes: Moments Like These | Kaitlyn Morrison | Television film (Hallmark Movies & Mysteries) |
| 2023 | Notes of Autumn | Ellie Matthews | Television film (Hallmark) |
| 2024 | Sister Wife Murder | Anna | Television film (Lifetime) |
| 2024 | Falling Together | Natalie | Television film (Hallmark) |
| 2024 | A Sprinkle of Deceit: A Hannah Swensen Mystery | Crying Actress | Television film (Hallmark) |
| 2024 | Jingle Bell Run | Avery | Television film (Hallmark) |
| 2025 | To Barcelona, with Love | Anna Kelly | Television film (Hallmark) |
| 2025 | To Barcelona, Forever | Anna Kelly | Television film (Hallmark) |
| 2026 | Much About Love | Bea | Television film (Hallmark) |
