= Robert Baker (actor) =

American actor

- Born: October 15, 1979 (age 47)
- Occupation: Actor
- Years active: 1999–present

Robert Baker (born October 15, 1979) is an American actor known for his roles in Valentine, Grey's Anatomy, Out of Time, and a supporting role in the film Special.

== Early life ==
Baker is the son of musician Lee Baker and his wife Carol. His father Lee was a member of the Memphis rock group, Mud Boy and the Neutrons.

== Career ==
He had a small role as a partygoer in the 1999 film Angel on Abbey Street. While still attending theater school at the University of Southern California, he landed a role in the TV movie The Ruling Class, playing a funny high school jock.

In 2018, Baker recurred in Supergirl as Mercy Graves' brother Otis Graves.

In 2024, Baker starred as Thomas Hose in the Lifetime movie The Girl Upstairs: The Tanya Kach Story as part of its "Ripped from the Headlines" feature film which was based on the Kidnapping of Tanya Nicole Kach.

== Filmography ==
=== Film ===
Year	Title	Role	Notes
1999	Angel on Abbey Street	Partygoer	
2001	Ruling Class	Andre	TV Movie
2003	Old School	Student #2	
2003	Out of Time	Tony Dalton	
2004	The Ladykillers	Quarterback	
2005	Little Athens	Berubi	
2006	Special	Everett	
2006	Seraphim Falls	Pope	
2007	Save Me	Lester	
2007	Towelhead	Mr. Joffrey	
2008	Indiana Jones and the Kingdom of the Crystal Skull	M.P. Sergeant Jimmy Wycroft	
2008	Leatherheads	Stump	
2013	G.I. Joe: Retaliation	Cobra Commander (voice)	Uncredited
2013	The Lone Ranger	Navarro	
2013	Devil's Knot	Detective Bryn Ridge	
2013	The Incident	Clive	Short film
2014	Our RoboCop Remake	Dick Jones	
2014	The Last Time You Had Fun	Simon	
2017	Charlie Foxtrot	Officer O'Brien	TV Movie
2022	Drawn Into the Night	Ronnie	
2022	Doula	Tony	

=== Television ===
Year	Title	Role	Notes
2002	JAG	Petty Officer 2nd Class Lester Petrosky	1 episode
2002	The Funkhousers	Murch	Television film
2003	CSI: Crime Scene Investigation	Virgil	1 episode (uncredited)
2003	NCIS	Seaman	1 episode
2004	Las Vegas	Slim	1 episode
2004	L.A. Dragnet	Robert "Bob" Allen Payne	2 episodes
2004	Six Feet Under	Priest	2 episodes
2004	Veronica Mars	Liam	Episode: "The Wrath of Con"
2005	Cold Case	Buck Lowman, 1976	1 episode
2005	Reunion	Cop	1 episode
2006	Ambrose Bierce: Civil War Stories	Re-enactor	Television film
2008–2009	Valentine	Leo Francisci; Hercules Leonardo Joveson	Main role
2009–2010, 2012, 2016	Grey's Anatomy	Dr. Charles Percy	Recurring (season 6) Guest (seasons 8 and 12)
2010	Law & Order: Los Angeles	Actor	1 episode
2013	CSI: NY	Calvin George	1 episode
2013	Justified	Randall Kusik	3 episodes
2013	Agents of S.H.I.E.L.D.	Tobias Ford	Episode: "Repairs"
2014	Mulaney	Chad	1 episode
2014	Mad Men	Lloyd Hawley	Episode: "The Monolith"
2014	True Blood	Mack	3 episodes
2014	Bones	Joe Martucci	1 episode
2015	Grimm	Frankie Atkins	1 episode
2015	Scandal	Kidnapper of Olivia	1 episode
2015	Texas Rising	Big Foot Wallace	TV mini-series
2016	Rizzoli & Isles	Jeff Collins	1 episode
2016	Grace & Frankie	Police Officer Leach	1 episode
2016	Kingdom	Kevin Bostic	1 episode
2016–2017	Longmire	Joe-Mega	4 episodes
2017	Riverdale	Mr. Robert Phillips / Sugar Man	2 episodes
2017	Modern Family	Pete Builder	Episode: "Heavy Is the Head"
2018	Santa Clarita Diet	Boone Traver	2 episodes
2018	The Originals	Emmett	3 episodes
2018	Wrecked	Brewster	3 episodes
2018	Ballers		Episode: "The Kids Are Alright"
2018–2021	Supergirl	Otis Graves	Recurring role
2020	Blindspot	Rafael Pierce	Episode: "I Came to Sleigh"
2020	The Magicians	Eliphas	Episode: "Purgatory"
2021	Magnum P.I.	Randall	Episode: "The Harder They Fall"
2022	Pivoting	Dan	Recurring role
2024	The Girl Upstairs: The Tanya Kach Story	Thomas Hose	Television film
2025	St. Denis Medical	Tom the Guard	Episode: "50 cc's of Kindness"
2025	S.W.A.T.	Bryce Morris	Episode: "Exploited"
2026	The Rookie	Helms	Episode: "The Thinker"

=== Video game ===
Year	Title	Role	Notes
2016	Call of Duty: Infinite Warfare	Sgt. Maynard 'Griff' Griffin (voice)	
2019	World War Z	Dima (voice)	
