= Revenge of the Bridesmaids =

2010 American TV Movie

- DVD cover
- Written by: David Kendall; Bob Young; Stephanie Phillips; Mark Amato
- Directed by: Jim Hayman
- Starring: Raven-Symoné; JoAnna García; Virginia Williams; Beth Broderick; Chryssie Whitehead; David Clayton Rogers; Lyle Brocato; Brittany Ishibashi
- Music by: Danny Lux
- Country of origin: United States
- Original language: English

Production
- Producers: Frank von Zerneck; Bob Sertner
- Running time: 95 minutes
- Production company: von Zerneck-Sertner Films
- Budget: ABC Family

Original release
- Release: July 18, 2010

Revenge of the Bridesmaids is a 2010 ABC Family Original Movie that premiered on July 18, 2010. It stars Raven-Symoné as Abigail and JoAnna García as Parker, undercover bridesmaids with a mission to break up a wedding. In addition, the film's cast also features Virginia Williams, Beth Broderick, Chryssie Whitehead, David Clayton Rogers, Lyle Brocato and Brittany Ishibashi.

== Plot ==
Two 29-year-old women, Abigail Scanlon and Parker Wald, best friends since childhood, return to their small hometown of Lambert, Louisiana from New York City for a visit. During a party to celebrate Parker's parents' wedding anniversary, they run into old friends. They learn that their close friend, Rachel, has lost the love of her life, Tony, to their ex-friend, Caitlyn, a conniving gold-digger who pretends to be pregnant to trick Tony into marrying her so that she can use his money to keep her family's estate.

Intent upon preventing a loveless marriage, Parker and Abigail go "undercover" as Caitlyn's bridesmaids to sabotage the wedding. Along the way, Caitlyn's tightly wound mother, Olivia, works hard to keep Abigail and Parker at bay as Parker falls for the town detective Henry Kent. The bridesmaids put their best-laid plans in motion only to see them go outrageously awry with Olivia interfering as much as possible. As a result, Abigail, Parker and Rachel are arrested by Henry, but Parker convinces him to release them. So Abigail, Parker, and Rachel sneak into the wedding and kidnap Caitlyn. They take her to the hospital for a pregnancy test and trick her into admitting the truth. At the wedding ceremony Tony lies to Caitlyn that his family lost their fortunes which leads to her canceling the wedding and storming off. After Caitlyn is gone, Tony gets on one knee and proposes to Rachel, also revealing that he lied and is still rich. At the end of the film, Parker stars in a major action film with Henry at her side as her consultant, Rachel marries Tony, and Abigail sells her book on their antics as bridesmaids.

== Cast ==
- Raven-Symoné as Abigail Scanlon
  - Esmeralda Alaniz as Young Abby
- JoAnna García as Parker Wald
  - Evelyn Boyle as Young Parker
- Virginia Williams as Caitlyn McNabb
  - Audrey P. Scott as Young Caitlyn
- Beth Broderick as Olivia McNabb, Caitlyn's mother
- Chryssie Whitehead as Rachel Phipps
  - Talia Tooraen as Young Rachel
- David Clayton Rogers as Henry Kent
- Lyle Brocato as Anthony "Tony" Penning Phipps
- Brittany Ishibashi as Bitsy
- Maureen Brennan as Penny Wald
- Gary Grubbs as Lou Wald
- Ann McKenzie as Charlotte Willington
- Angelena Swords as Ashlie
- Lacey Minchew as Ashley
- Billy Slaughter as Gary
- Carl J. Walker as Glen Woodward

== Production ==
In March 2010, Raven-Symoné announced that she would star in an upcoming romantic comedy for ABC Family, via Say Now. This was her first television film since The Cheetah Girls 2 in 2006.

Filming took place in April 2010 in New Orleans, Louisiana at the Opera Guild Home (previously named the Davis-Seybold Mansion) and at the Houmas House in Burnside, Louisiana. Jim Hayman directed the film.

== Reception and release ==
The film received 2.55 million viewers at its premiere, placing it in the top 5 "highest-rated" ABC Family Original Movie premieres list.

The film was released on DVD in the US on April 26, 2011.

== Awards ==
Year	Award	Category	Result
2010	Teen Film/TV Series International Awards	Best Actress: Lead Role on Comedy Film for Raven-Symoné	Won
2010	Teen Film/TV Series International Awards	Best Actress: Lead Role on Comedy Film for Joanna Garcia	Nominated
2010	Teen Film/TV Series International Awards	Best Film Made for Television	Won
2010	Teen Film/TV Series International Awards	Best Comedy Film of the Year	Won
2011	ADG Excellence in Production Design Award	Television Movie or Mini-Series	Nominated
2011	People's Choice Awards 2011	Favorite Family TV Movie	Nominated
