= Paul Blackthorne =

English actor (born 1969)

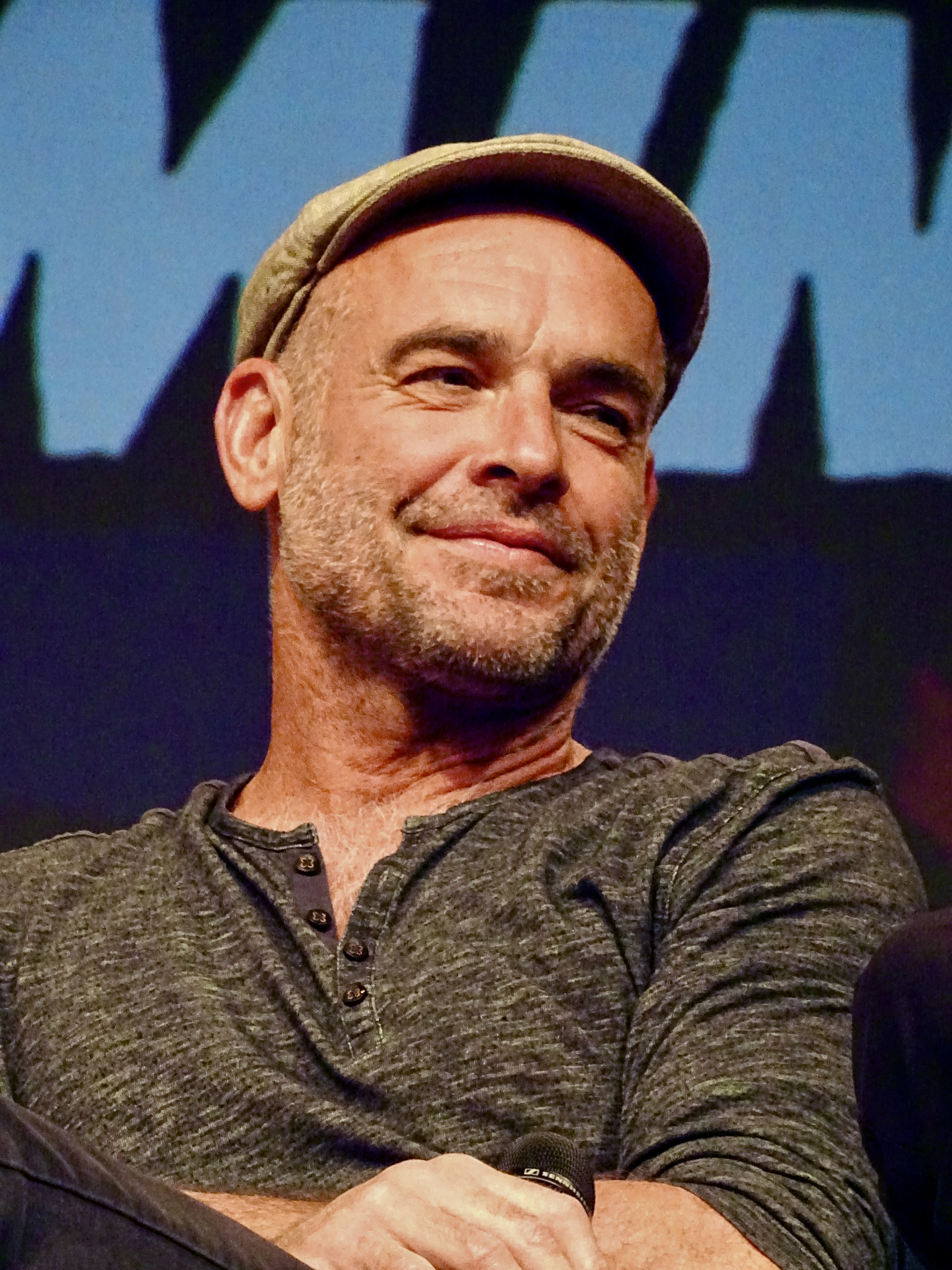
- Blackthorne at Wales Comic-Con Homecoming Wrexham 2022
- Born: 5 March 1969 (age 57); Wellington, Shropshire, England
- Occupation: Actor
- Years active: 1998–present

Paul Blackthorne (born 5 March 1969) is an English actor. Although born in Shropshire, he spent his early childhood on UK military bases in Britain and Germany.

Blackthorne broke into acting via television advertisements in England. His breakthrough commercial in the UK came in the Grim Reaper advertisement for Virgin Atlantic. Numerous radio commercials followed.

Blackthorne's first film role was in the Academy Award nominated Hindi-language Indian film Lagaan, released in 2001. Since then, he has mostly appeared in American films and television shows. He had recurring roles on ER and 24, both in 2004, and has been a main cast member in The Dresden Files (2007), Lipstick Jungle (2008–09) and Arrow (2012–18).

== Film ==
Blackthorne's first film role was as Captain Andrew Russell in the Oscar-nominated Bollywood film Lagaan. He spent six months learning Hindi for the role.

He also starred in the independent feature-length film Four Corners of Suburbia, winner of both the Crossroads Film Festival in Best Narrative Feature (2006) and in the category of Best Composer at the Avignon Film Festival, Avignon, France (2006).

Additional indie film credits include Bret Easton Ellis's This Is Not an Exit, and a starring role in the British film The Truth Game. Blackthorne appeared as Jonas Exiler in Special, with Michael Rapaport.

Blackthorne's directorial debut This American Journey was released in 2013. The road trip documentary film follows Blackthorne and Australian photographer Mister Basquali as they travel across America interviewing everyday Americans about how they feel about their country and their hopes for its future. The film was featured at the Hollywood, Carmel, Ojai and Big Bear Film Festivals. It was released through Cinema Libre Studios.

Blackthorne would be joined the cast of Dark Ascension, as "Willis".

== Television ==
In 2002, Blackthorne portrayed British doctor Matt Slingerland on Presidio Med and made appearances as Guy Morton in the British television series Holby City, Liam MacGregor in Peak Practice, Doctor Jeremy Lawson in NBC's ER and biological terrorist Stephen Saunders on 24. He also appeared on Medium in two roles (one uncredited as Henry Stoller, Junior), Deadwood, and an episode of Monk Season 5 Episode 10 "Mr. Monk and the Leper" as dermatologist Aaron Polanski. He appeared as Shane Healy, a British musician and husband of Wendy Healy (played by Brooke Shields), in the NBC series Lipstick Jungle for two seasons. He played an IRA terrorist in the US series Burn Notice in 2009 in one episode. In 2010, he appeared in two episodes of Leverage as an arms dealer and in an episode of CSI: Miami directed by Rob Zombie. Later that year he had a recurring role in The Gates as Christian Harper. Also on 7 December 2010, he appeared in the Christmas episode ("Secret Santa") of the SyFy series Warehouse 13. He appeared in a two-part cliffhanger during the mid-season break of White Collar Season 2.

In the Sci Fi Channel's 2007 series, The Dresden Files, Blackthorne portrayed the lead character, wizard / detective Harry Dresden.

He starred as Clark Quietly in the ABC paranormal/adventure/horror television series The River about a group of people on a mission to find a missing TV explorer in the Amazon.

In 2012, Blackthorne joined the main cast of The CW superhero drama series Arrow as Detective Quentin Lance. He left the series at the end of the sixth season in May 2018, but returned in a guest role in the eighth and final season in the episode "Fadeout".

== Personal life ==
In 2001, shortly after filming of Lagaan finished in India, the town where filming took place was levelled by an earthquake, including the apartment building in which the cast of Lagaan was staying. To assist the earthquake victims, Blackthorne exhibited his photography in a show in London.

He is the godfather of actor Jacob Dudman.

== Filmography ==
=== Film ===
Year	Title	Role	Notes
1998	Romeo Thinks Again	Romeo	
2000	Rhythm & Blues	John	
2001	Lagaan	Captain Andrew Russell	Hindi film
2001	The Truth Game	Dan	
2003	Mindcrime	Man	
2005	Four Corners of Suburbia	Walt Samson	
2006	Special	Jonas Exiler	
2008	The Gold Lunch	Ex-Husband	
2009	A Christmas Carol	Guest No. 3, Business Man No. 2	Voice
2012	Justice League: Doom	John Corben / Metallo, Henry Ackerson	Voice
2013	This American Journey	Self	
2014	Dumb and Dumber To	Emergency Room Doctor	Cameo
2017	Dark Ascension	Willis	
2017	Daisy Winters	Robert Stergen	
2021	Margrete: Queen of the North	William Bourcier	

=== Television ===
Year	Title	Character	Notes
1999	Jonathan Creek	Gino	Episode: "The Eye of Tiresias"
2000	Rhythm & Blues	John	
2001	Holby City	Guy Morton	11 episodes
2002–03	Presidio Med	Dr. Matt Slingerland	13 episodes
2004	Gramercy Park	Jack Quinn	Unaired pilot
2004	ER	Dr. Jeremy Lawson	5 episodes
2004	24	Stephen Saunders	10 episodes
2005	Medium	Henry Stoller	Episode: "I Married a Mind Reader"
2006	Monk	Dr. Aaron Polanski	Episode: "Mr. Monk and the Leper"
2007	The Dresden Files	Harry Dresden	Lead role, 12 episodes
2007	Big Shots	Terrence Hill	9 episodes
2008–09	Lipstick Jungle	Shane Healy	20 episodes
2009	Burn Notice	Thomas O'Neill	Episode: "Long Way Back"
2010	Warehouse 13	Larry Newly	Episode: "Secret Santa"
2010	Leverage	Tony Kadjic	2 episodes
2010	CSI: Miami	Tony Enright	Episode: "L.A."
2010	White Collar	Julian Larssen	2 episodes
2010	The Gates	Christian Harper	6 episodes
2012	The River	Clark Quietly	8 episodes
2012	CSI: Crime Scene Investigation	Professor Tom Laudner	Episode: "Trends with Benefits"
2012	Necessary Roughness	Jack St. Cloud	Episode: "Mr. Irrelevant"
2012–20	Arrow	Quentin Lance	Series regular (Season 1–6); Special guest star (season 7); recurring role (season 8)
2015–17	The Flash	Quentin Lance	Special guest star (Seasons 1 & 4)
2016	Legends of Tomorrow	Quentin Lance	Special guest star (Season 1)
2019	The InBetween	Detective Tom Hackett	Series regular
2023	The Company You Keep	John Baylor	
2023	Magnum P.I.	Xavier	Episode: "Hit & Run"

=== Video games ===
Year	Title	Character	Notes
2017	Star Wars Battlefront II	Gideon Hask	
