= The Capture of the Green River Killer =

- Based on: Chasing the Devil: My Twenty-Year Quest to Capture the Green River Killer by Dave Reichert
- Written by: John Pielmeier
- Directed by: Norma Bailey
- Starring: Tom Cavanagh; Amy Davidson; Sharon Lawrence; James Russo; James Marsters
- Theme music composer: Christopher Ward
- Country of origin: United States
- Original language: English

Production
- Producers: Stanley M. Brooks; Damian Ganczewski; Juliette Hagopian
- Cinematography: Mathias Herndl
- Editor: Ron Wisman
- Running time: 89 minutes

Original release
- Network: Lifetime Movie Network
- Release: March 30 – March 31, 2008

The Capture of the Green River Killer is a 2008 television miniseries that first aired on Lifetime Movie Network and tells the story of the Green River killer serial murders between 1982 and 1998.

The miniseries was named one of the top 10 television productions of 2008 by Variety and was twice nominated for a 2008 Gemini Award for best direction and for best costuming. Lifetime's premiere of The Capture of the Green River Killer delivered two million viewers, making it 10-year-old Lifetime Movie Network's most-watched telecast ever.

== Background ==
The film is based on David Reichert's book, Chasing the Devil: My Twenty-Year Quest to Capture the Green River Killer. The film's biggest departure from the book is a fictional inclusion of two teenage girls, one of whom, Helen "Hel" Remus, is a young runaway who decides to turn to prostitution to escape her mother's abusive boyfriend, in a sympathetic storyline to honor Ridgway's victims. Detective Dave Reichert works the murder cases and stays on the case from beginning to end, including extensive interviews with incarcerated serial killer Ted Bundy.

== Cast ==
- Tom Cavanagh as Dave Reichert
- Michelle Harrison as Julie Reichert
- Amy Davidson as Helen 'Hel' Remus
- Sharon Lawrence as Fiona Remus
- Christina Lindley as Lynn Mosey
- James Marsters as Ted Bundy
- John Pielmeier as Gary Ridgway
- James Russo as Jeb Dallas
- Zak Santiago as Seth Imperia
- Maya Ritter as Teen Angela
- Brendan Fletcher as Bobby
- Currie Graham as Captain Norwell
- Jessica Harmon as Natalie 'Nat' Webley
- Aaron Hughes as Ellie's Boyfriend
- Ingrid Rogers as Det. Faye Brooks
- Bret Anthony as Bram Seton
- Dan Augusta as Young Gary Ridgway
- Paige Bannister as Colleen Brockman
- Trisha Benjamin as Marsue Haller
- Sarah Constible as Mary Meehan
- John Fasano as Joe Jakes
- Alicia Johnston as Gary's Mom
- Suzanne Kelly as Opal Mills
- Kristen Sawatzky as Ellie Slater
- Jenna Ullenboom as Wendy Coffield
- Solmund MacPherson as Boy

== Music ==
The main music theme is taken out of the symphonic poem From Bohemia's Fields and Meadows (Z českých luhů a hájů). It is the fourth part of a set of six symphonic poems Má vlast (My Homeland) by Czech composer Bedřich Smetana.

== Reception ==
Barry Garron of The Hollywood Reporter wrote, "Using dark colors and jarring images, director Norma Bailey tries to infuse the work with suspense and mystery. The story itself, a repetitive tale unfolding at a languid pace, impedes the effort."
