= Anna Belknap =

American actress

- Born: Damariscotta, Maine U.S.
- Education: Middlebury College (BA); American Conservatory Theater (MFA)
- Occupation: Actress
- Years active: 1996–present
- Spouse: Eric Siegel (m. 2004)
- Children: 2

Anna Belknap is an American actress. She is known for her role as Detective Lindsay Monroe Messer on CSI: NY.

== Early life ==
Belknap was born in Damariscotta, Maine. She is a daughter of David and Louise Belknap. She attended Lincoln Academy in Newcastle, Maine. While attending Middlebury College in Vermont, she gained an interest in acting. She then studied at the American Conservatory Theater, earning a Master of Fine Arts degree.

== Career ==
Belknap's television credits include series regular roles in Medical Investigation and The Handler, a recurring role in Deadline, and guest-starring roles in Law & Order, Law & Order: Special Victims Unit, and Without a Trace.

Belknap appeared in the movie Alchemy and made her feature film debut in the independent film The Reality Trap.

Belknap joined the cast of the long-running crime drama CSI: NY as Detective Lindsay Monroe in 2005 during the season two's episode, "Zoo York".

Her stage credits include the Off-Broadway production of Metamorphoses at New York's Second Stage Theatre, as well as roles at the Mark Taper Forum, the Old Globe Theatre, the Westport Country Playhouse, and the Williamstown Theatre Festival.

== Personal life ==
In 2004, Belknap married Eric Siegel, a colleague from the Rude Mechanicals Theater Company in New York. They have two children.

During filming for the show CSI: NY, an episode describes her being bitten by a cobra. This event was used to reduce her screen time during her first pregnancy (which, unlike her second one, was not written into the show). She also left to go home to Montana in an episode to testify in a trial to cut her screen time. Her second pregnancy was written into several episodes of season five, where her character has a daughter with husband Danny Messer.

== Accolades ==
Belknap was the recipient of the 2002 San Diego Theater Critics Circle's Craig Noel Award for Outstanding Performance as Marina in the Old Globe Theatre's production of Pericles by William Shakespeare.

== Filmography ==
Television roles
Year	Title	Role	Notes
1996	Homicide: Life on the Street	Julia Pfeiffer	Episode 4.22: "Work Related"
1999	Law & Order	Jessica Buehl	Episode 9.10: "Hate"
1999	Trinity	Woman	Episode 7: "Having Trouble with the Language"
2000–01	Deadline	Chase	4 episodes
2001	Law & Order: Special Victims Unit	Sarah Kimmel	Episode 2.18: "Manhunt"
2001	The Education of Max Bickford	Mimi Askew	Episode 6: "Do It Yourself"
2003–04	The Handler	Lily	Main role (16 episodes)
2004	The Jury	Karen Linney	Episode 7: "The Boxer"
2004–05	Medical Investigation	Eva Rossi	Main role (20 episodes)
2005	The Comeback	Sara Peterman	Episode 13: "Valerie Does Another Classic Leno"
2005	Without a Trace	Paige Hobson	Episodes 3.23: "Endgame" and 4.01 "Showdown"
2005–13	CSI: NY	Lindsay Monroe/Messer	Lead role Seasons 2-9
2015	Hawaii Five-0	Amy Lange	Episode 5.13: "Lā Pōʻino"
2015	How to Get Away with Murder	Oncology Nurse	Episode 2.07: "I Want You to Die"
2017	The Good Doctor	Cora	Episode 1.16: "[Pain]"
2019	NCIS: Los Angeles	Robin Ip	Episode 11.9: "Kill Beale: Vol. 1"
2020	Chicago Med	Dr. Linda Strauss	Episode 5. 17: "The Ghosts Of The Past"
2022	Law & Order: Special Victims Unit	Ginny McCann	Episode 24.9: "And A Trauma In A Pear Tree"

Film roles
Year	Title	Role	Notes
2005	The Reality Trap	Tracy	
2005	Alchemy	Marissa	
2015	No Way Jose	Kate	
