= Chryssie Whitehead =

American actress

- Occupations: Stage, film and television actress, dancer, choreographer and teacher

Chryssie Whitehead is an American actress, singer and dancer on Broadway, film and television as well as an educator, director and choreographer. She is known for playing Kristine in the 2006 revival of A Chorus Line and Kathy in the 2011 New York Philharmonic staging of Company. She also plays herself in the documentary Every Little Step.

== Early life and education ==
Whitehead grew up in South Carolina. During her first year of high school, she was in a community theatre production of A Chorus Line, in which she played a cut dancer and understudy to Judy.

== Career ==
=== Off Broadway ===
Before appearing on Broadway, Whitehead was a Rockette in Los Angeles and New York City at the start of her career right out of high school. She toured and performed in Fosse, The Will Rogers Follies, All Shook Up and Paul McCartney's "Driving Rain" tour.

=== On Broadway ===
Her Broadway debut was starring in the 2006 Broadway revival of A Chorus Line, in which she played the character of Kristine alongside Tony Yazbeck. The audition process that she took to get the role can be seen in Every Little Step, a documentary of the A Chorus Line Broadway revival casting process. Following Broadway, television roles ensued, as well as the musicals Damn Yankees as Lola, Gigi, Cats, A Chorus Line (as Cassie) and Will Rogers Follies as Z's Favorite. In 2011, she appeared in the role of Kathy opposite Neil Patrick Harris as Bobby in the New York Philharmonic staging of Company. In 2016– 2017, she played the role of Kitty in the Broadway revival of Chicago, where she understudied and performed the role of Velma Kelly.

=== In film and television ===
Whitehead was Julia Stiles' dance double in the final audition scene of Save the Last Dance. She has also been in The Producers and other independent films. She was also in the ABC Family TV movie Revenge of the Bridesmaids with Raven Simone.

On television, Whitehead appeared as Helen Boyd in a 2007 episode of Grey's Anatomy, "Kung Fu Fighting", as well as in the TV series In Plain Sight in the episode "Coma Chameleon", playing the character of Krista. In 2011, she appeared on the TV series Castle, The Mentalist and Happy Endings. In 2012, she appeared on Switched at Birth. In 2013, she had a recurring role on four episodes of Private Practice. In 2014, Whitehead was a recurring guest star for three of the six final episodes of Warehouse 13. She played Claire Donovan, the older sister and eldest sibling to Claudia and Joshua Donovan. Her last television appearance was during the third season of Grimm in 2014. Her last film credit was in the remake of West Side Story film directed by Steven Spielberg as the female social worker at the dance at the gym.

=== Other aspects ===
In addition to performing, Whitehead is a director, choreographer and writer. She produced her autobiographical show, In My Own Little Corner: A Work in Progress with Bipolar Disorder in 2022.

She is the co-founder and director of the performing arts educational company Broadway Arts Community (BAC) with Alexis Carra. BAC coaches privately and provides workshops in acting for camera, musical theatre, college and career prep.

Whitehead teaches theatre jazz and jazz dance at Broadway Dance Center and Steps on Broadway in New York.

== Personal life ==
Whitehead resides in New York City with her husband and two dogs. She is a director and musical theatre faculty member at the American Musical and Dramatic Academy on the New York campus.
