= Amalia Williamson =

Canadian actress (born 1999)

- Born: 2 June 1999 (age 27); Oakville, Ontario, Canada
- Education: Sheridan College
- Occupation: Actress

TikTok information
- Page: amaliajwilliamson
- Followers: 15.1 K
- Last updated: 21 March 2026

Amalia Williamson (born 2 June 1999) is a Canadian actress and social media personality. She is known for her role as Maddie West in Northern Rescue and Lola Gunderson in Sullivan's Crossing

== Early life and education ==
Williamson was born in Oakville, Ontario. She is the oldest of four siblings. Williams grew up participating in local theatre productions in Oakville.

She trained at Armstrong Acting Studios and studied film and television at Sheridan College.

== Career ==
When she was fifteen, Williams was cast in a commercial for Miley Cyrus's and Max Azria's clothing line at Walmart. She signed with Ambition Talent and made her television debut as Emily in television movie Playing Dead. She played the role of Rita in the Canadian indie thriller film Level 16 and Chelsea in the 2019 WildBrain television series Bajillionaires. She was cast as Madelyn "Maddie" West in the 2019 CBC and Netflix family drama television series Northern Rescue. In 2020, she was cast as Melodie Miller in the mystery drama film The Kid Detective starring Adam Brody.

In 2020, she produced a short film, I Am Here, about a brother and sister who are separated during the Syrian Civil War.

In 2026, she will star as Andrea Walker in You're Killing Me, a six-episode mystery series, alongside Brooke Shields and Tom Cavanagh.

== Filmography ==
Amalia Williamson film and television work
| Year | Title | Role | Notes |
|---|---|---|---|
| 2015 | Punctual Condolence | Amalia | Short film |
| 2016 | Blue Light | Burlesque Woman | Short film |
| 2018 | Level 16 | Rita | Movie |
| 2018 | Rosie | Street girl (uncredited) | Short film |
| 2018 | Surprise (Friendship) | Megan | Short film |
| 2018 | Playing Dead | Emily | TV movie |
| 2018 | Bajillionares | Chelsea | 1 episode |
| 2019 | Northern Rescue | Madelyn West | 10 episodes |
| 2020 | Glass Houses | Blair | TV movie |
| 2020 | Remember Me, Mommy? | Janie Wade | TV movie |
| 2020 | The Kid Detective | Melody Miller | Film |
| 2020 | Private Eyes | Hannah Whysner | 1 episode |
| 2021 | Frankie Drake Mysteries | Lena | 1 episode |
| 2021 | A Christmas Letter | Claudette | TV movie |
| 2022–2023 | Children Ruin Everything | Bubblegum | 5 episodes |
| 2023 | Bria Mack Gets a Life | Gemma | 6 episodes |
| 2023 | Letterkenny | Harley | 4 episodes |
| 2023–present | Sullivan's Crossing | Lola Gunderson | 26 episodes |
| 2023–present | Finance Couple | Veruca Rashnikov | web series |
| 2025 | My Sister's Double Life | Hayley Ellis | TV movie |
| 2025 | The Truth Fairy | Veruca | Short film |
| TBD | You're Killing Me | Andrea Walker | 6 episodes. |
| TBD | Jilliahsmen Trinity: 2.0 - R.O.Y.G.B.I.V | | Production unknown |
| TBD | Super Dicks | Sasha | Post-production |
