= Patrick Fabian =

American actor (born 1964)

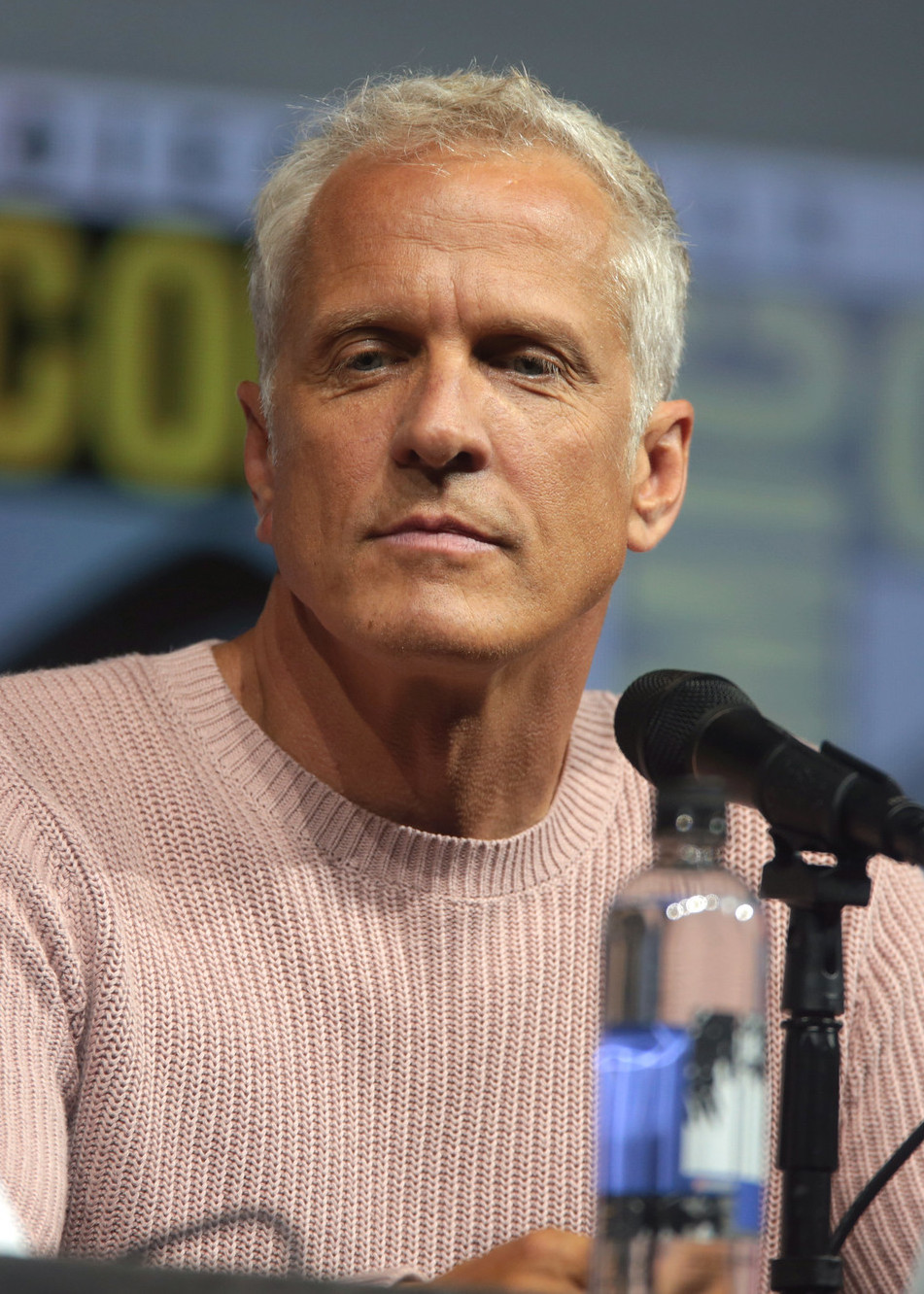
- Fabian in 2018
- Born: December 7, 1964 (age 61); Pittsburgh, Pennsylvania, U.S.
- Education: Pennsylvania State University, University Park (BFA); California State University, Long Beach (MFA)
- Occupation: Actor
- Years active: 1991–present
- Spouse: Mandy Steckelberg
- Patrick Fabian's voice Fabian discussing his role as Hank Henshaw in The Death of Superman and Reign of the Supermen; Recorded 2018

Patrick Fabian (born December 7, 1964) is an American film, stage, and television actor. He is best known for his role as attorney Howard Hamlin in Better Call Saul (2015–2022). His film roles include End Game (2006), The Last Exorcism (2010), Pig (2011), Jimmy (2013), and Cloud 9 (2014).

== Early life and education ==
Patrick Fabian is the son of Tom and Mary Lou Fabian. He is of Slovak and Hungarian ancestry through his paternal grandfather. He was born in Pittsburgh and grew up in New Cumberland, Pennsylvania. His father worked for the Pennsylvania Higher Education Assistance Agency (PHEAA). After graduating from Cedar Cliff High School in Camp Hill, Pennsylvania, he attended Penn State University and received his Bachelor of Fine Arts in Performance. He moved to California, where he earned a master's degree from California State University, Long Beach.

== Career ==
One of Fabian's earliest prominent roles was as Professor Jeremiah Lasky on NBC's Saved by the Bell: The College Years (1993–1994). He was in the main cast of the short-lived television series Valentine (2008–2009), Working Class (2011), and Special (2019–2021). He had recurring roles on Joan of Arcadia, Veronica Mars, Gigantic, and Big Love. Fabian also appeared in the unaired 1997 Dilbert live action pitch pilot.

Fabian has appeared in a number of films including The Last Exorcism, and has had a number of guest appearances on high-profile TV shows including Will & Grace and Friends. Fabian was cast to play Howard Hamlin, a main role in the AMC television series, Better Call Saul.

Fabian's theatre work in New York includes The Food Chain by Nicky Silver, Humpty Dumpty by Eric Bogosian, Six Degrees of Separation (national tour), and, in Los Angeles, Diva by Howard Gould and Dinner with Friends by Donald Margulies, as well as two seasons at LA's Shakespeare Festival.

== Personal life ==
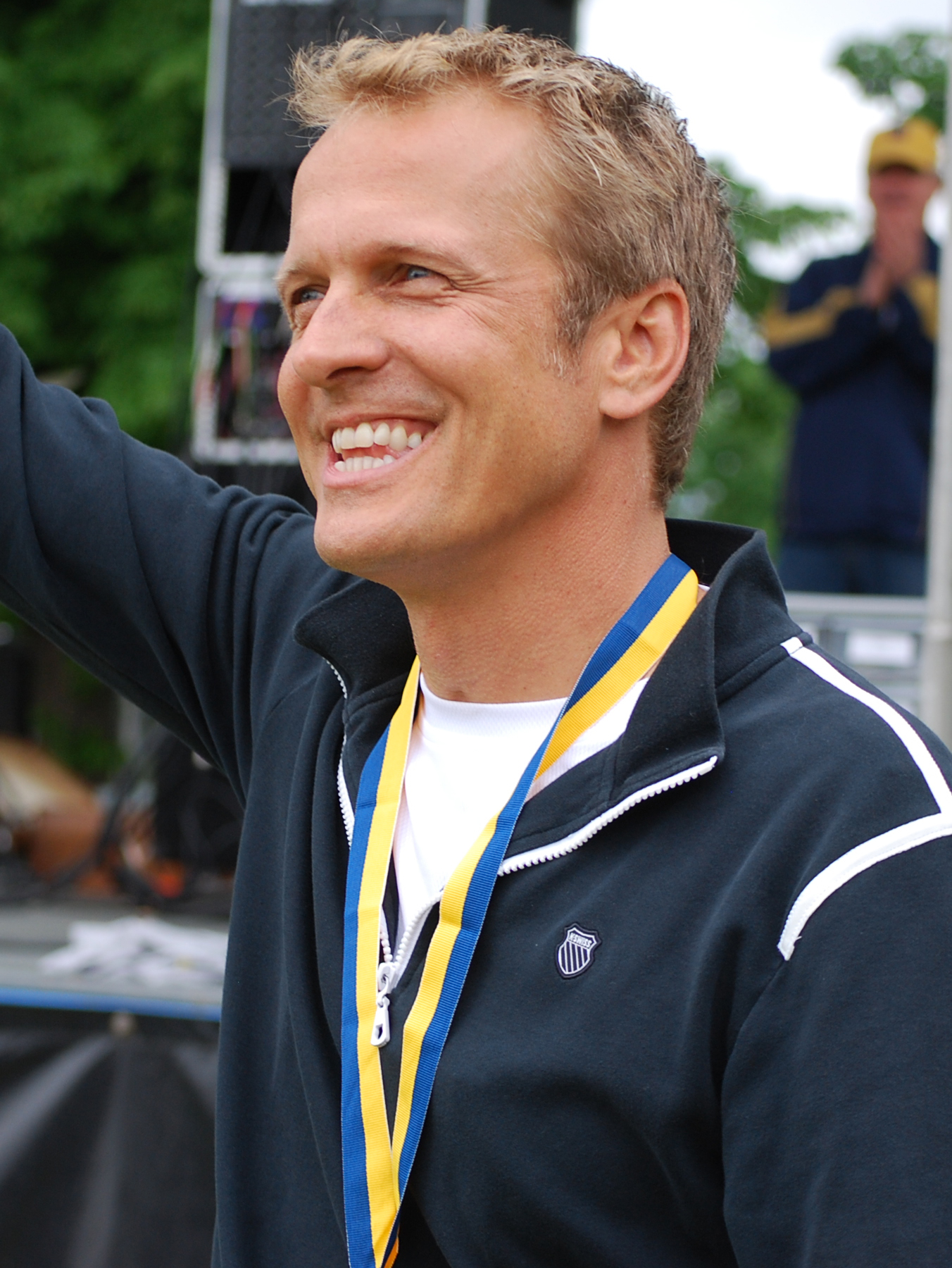
Fabian in 2011

Fabian has been a member of SAG-AFTRA's National and Los Angeles Local Board of Directors, running under the Unite for Strength slate.

He is married to writer and comedian Mandy Steckelberg. During Better Call Saul's principal photography, Fabian would live with cast members Bob Odenkirk and Rhea Seehorn in an Albuquerque house owned by Odenkirk and his wife. Odenkirk mentioned that this was for the actors to keep each other company after filming had finished for the day, as he had lived by himself during the first season and felt a sense of loneliness when he was home. Seehorn stated that the actors and their spouses all knew of and were friends with one another, so all parties were content with the living arrangement. Fabian was known to make his housemates dinner when they came home from filming.

== Filmography ==
=== Film ===
Year	Title	Role	Notes
1998	Jane Austen's Mafia!	Riverdancer	
1998	Sour Grapes	Palmer	
2004	Clean	Bobby Franklin	
2004	Snow	Buck	
2005	Must Love Dogs	Donald	
2006	End Game	Brian Martin	
2009	Spring Breakdown	Kevin	
2010	The Last Exorcism	Cotton Marcus	
2010	The Land of the Astronauts	Russell	
2011	Pig	Internist	
2012	Bad Ass	Officer Malark	
2012	Tales of Everyday Magic	Ryan Kilgore	
2012	Atlas Shrugged: Part 2	James Taggart	
2013	Jimmy	Lee Mitchell	
2014	Bad Ass 2: Bad Asses	Officer Malark	
2017	DriverX	Leonard Moore	
2018	The Death of Superman	Hank Henshaw	Voice role; direct-to-video film
2019	Reign of the Supermen	Hank Henshaw	Voice role; direct-to-video film
2019	Eat, Brains, Love	Alastaire	
2023	Snow Falls	River's Dad	
2023	Batman: The Doom That Came to Gotham	Harvey Dent	Voice role; direct-to-video film
2023	The Other Zoey	Matt MacLaren	
2024	The Way We Speak	Simon Harrington	
2025	The Ritual	Bishop Edwards	
2026	The Debut	Howard Friedman	
TBA	Sponsor †	Randall	Completed

=== Television ===
Year	Title	Role	Notes
1992	Bodies of Evidence	Scott Easton	Episode: "The Edge"
1992	Silk Stalkings	Ron Gerschak	Episode: "Bad Blood"
1993	For Love and Glory	N/A	Unsold television pilot
1993	Beverly Hills, 90210	Charlie Dixon	Episode: "The Little Fish"
1993–1994	Saved by the Bell: The College Years	Prof. Jeremiah Lasky	Recurring role, 8 episodes
1994	Murder, She Wrote	Larry Shields	Episode: "Murder of the Month Club"
1995	University Hospital	Kurt Palmer	Episode: "Endings and Beginnings"
1995	Melrose Place	Lowell	Episode: "To Live and Die in Malibu"
1996	Boston Common	Prof. Jack Reed	Episode: "Pilot"
1996	Townies	Danny	Episode: "Townies"
1997	Star Trek: Voyager	Taymon	Episode: "Favorite Son"
1997	Weapons of Mass Distraction	Brandon Joyner	Television movie
1997	Millennium	Ratfinkovich	Episode: "Jose Chung's Doomsday Defense"
1997	General Hospital	Ted Murty	Unknown episodes
1998	Xena: Warrior Princess	Rafe	Episode: "King Con"
1998	Jenny	Parker	Episode: "A Girl's Gotta Come Through in a Clutch"
1998	Timecop	Dean Cooke / Eric Cooke	Episode: "Lost Voyage"
1998	Friends	Dan	Episode: "The One Hundredth"
1999	Wasteland	N/A	Episode: "Great Expectations"
1999	Cupid	Don Quixote	Episode: "Grand Delusions"
1999	Two of a Kind	Alex Reardon	Episode: "My Boyfriend's Back"
1999	Dharma & Greg	Doug	Episode: "Looking for the Goodbars"
1999–2000	Time of Your Life	Spencer Halloway	Recurring role, 6 episodes
1999–2002	Providence	Jerry Kaufman	Recurring role, 7 episodes
2000	Arli$$	Jacques	Episode: "Honoring Our Past"
2000	FreakyLinks	Wayne	Episode: "Subject: Edith Keeler Must Die"
2001	The Trouble with Normal	Eric	Episode: "Manhattan Transference"
2001	Rude Awakening	Brian	2 episodes
2001	Nash Bridges	Ethan	Episode: "Slam Dunk"
2001	The Education of Max Bickford	Josh Howlett	Episode: "Herding Cats"
2003	Jack's House	N/A	Television movie
2003	Without a Trace	N/A	Episode: "The Source"
2003	CSI: Crime Scene Investigation	Rhone Kinsey-Confer	Episode: "Forever"
2003	Just Shoot Me!	Martin	Episode: "A Simple Kiss of Fate"
2003–2005	Joan of Arcadia	Gavin Price	Recurring role, 16 episodes
2004	Crossing Jordan	Buddy Holly / Horned Rimmed Glasses	Episode: "Is That Plutonium in Your Pocket, or Are; You Just Happy to See Me?"
2004	24	William Cole	2 episodes
2004	Helter Skelter	Jay Sebring	Television movie
2004	Summerland	Ian Straub	Episode: "Pilot"
2004	North Shore	Dr. Burtwhistle	Episode: "Meteor Shower"
2004	Medical Investigation	Gary Riesen	Episode: "Escape"
2004	Quintuplets	Coach Scales	Episode: "Teacher's Pet"
2004	Will & Grace	Alan	Episode: "Saving Grace, Again: Part 1"
2004	Snow	Buck Seger	Television movie
2005	Blind Justice	Clay Simmons	Episode: "Four Feet Under"
2005	Eyes	Doug Taft	Episode: "Pilot"
2005	Everwood	Dr. Henry Validor	Episode: "Oh, the Places You'll Go"
2005	CSI: Miami	Ken Gannon	Episode: "Blood in the Water"
2005	Reba	Rev. Parks	Episode: "And God Created Van"
2005	Twitches	Thantos	Television movie
2006	Shark	Dr. Charlie Bender	Episode: "Dr. Feelbad"
2006	Ugly Betty	Fashion TV Anchor	Episode: "The Lyin', the Watch and the Wardrobe"
2006–2007	Veronica Mars	Professor Hank Landry	Recurring role, 8 episodes
2006–2007	Close to Home	Mike Bachner / Mrs. Veeder's lawyer	2 episodes
2007	Pushing Daisies	Mark Chase	Episode: "Dummy"
2007	Twitches Too	Thantos	Television movie
2007	Viva Laughlin	Steve	Episode: "Pilot"
2007	Bones	Terry Stinson	Episode: "Boy in the Time Capsule"
2007	NCIS	Ray Vincent	Episode: "Corporal Punishment"
2007	Las Vegas	Ted Leandros	Episode: "The High Price of Gas"
2008	Boston Legal	Attorney Stanley Gould	Episode: "Mad About You"
2008	Burn Notice	Zeke	Episode: "Trust Me"
2008	The Cleaner	Tom D'Agostino	Episode: "Rebecca"
2008	Snow 2: Brain Freeze	Buck Seger	Television movie
2008–2009	Valentine	Ray Howard / Hephaestus	Main role
2009	Life	Dr. Stanton	Episode: "Mirror Ball"
2009	The Mentalist	Rand Faulk	Episode: "Carnelian, Inc."
2009	According to Jim	Daniel	Episode: "The Yoga Bear"
2009	Drop Dead Diva	Kevin Hanson	Episode: "The Dress"
2009	Crash	Jonas Dixon	2 episodes
2009–2010	Big Love	Ted Price	Recurring role, 10 episodes
2010	The Deep End	Attorney	Episode: "Pilot"
2010	Rizzoli & Isles	Nate	Episode: "Boston Strangler Redux"
2010	Svetlana	Pastor	Episode: "You're Svencome"
2010	CSI: NY	Charles Richmore	Episode: "Shop Till You Drop"
2010–2011	Gigantic	John Moore	Recurring role, 13 episodes
2011	Working Class	Rob Parker	Main role, 8 episodes
2011	Hot in Cleveland	Richard	Episode: "Unseparated at Birthdates"
2011	Private Practice	Robert Weston	Episode: "Breaking the Rules"
2012	Desperate Housewives	Frank	2 episodes
2012	Hawaii Five-0	Tony Denis	Episode: "Kupale"
2012	Longmire	Dr. Dennis Nunn, DVM	Episode: "8 Seconds"
2012	The Finder	CEO Anderson	Episode: "Little Green Men"
2012	Criminal Minds	Barry Flynn	Episode: "Magnificent Light"
2012–2013	The Newsroom	Tony Hart	2 episodes
2013	Castle	Peter Monroe	Episode: "Reality Star Struck"
2013	The Good Mother	Scott	Television movie
2013	Scandal	Senator Meyers	Episode: "Say Hello to My Little Friend"
2014	Cloud 9	Richard Morgan	Television movie
2014	Franklin & Bash	Paul Levy	Episode: "Deep Throat"
2014	Grey's Anatomy	Dr. Oliver Lebackes	Episode: "You Be Illin'"
2015	Scorpion	Captain Stephen Caine	Episode: "Love Boat"
2015–2022	Better Call Saul	Howard Hamlin	Main role
2016	Casa Vita	Coach Willis	Television fim
2016	Grimm	Dr. Eugene Forbes	Episode: "Skin Deep"
2017	Elementary	Lars Vestergaard	Episode: "Dead Man's Tales"
2017–2021	Lucifer	Reese Getty	2 episodes
2018	Agents of S.H.I.E.L.D.	Senator Gaius Ponarian	Episode: "Fun & Games"
2018	Code Black	Owen Edwards	3 episodes
2019	Barry	Space Dad	Episode: "The Power of No"
2019	The Conners	James	Episode: "Nightmare on Lunch Box Street"
2019–2021	Special	Phil	Main role
2020	Carol's Second Act	Dr. Lewis	4 episodes
2020	Black Monday	Governor Putnam	3 episodes
2021	The Morning Show	Jeff	Episode: "It's Like the Flu"
2022	Gordita Chronicles	Mr. Frank	4 episodes
2022	Big Shot	Mark	3 episodes
2023	Kung Fu	David Wheeler	2 episodes
2023	Moonshine	Dick Lonergan	Episode: "High Season"
2023	Cooper's Bar	Peter	Episode: "The Cast"
2023–2024	Magnum P.I.	Sam Bedrosian	2 episodes
2024	Tracker	Shane Niall	Episode: "Bloodlines"
2025	Pluribus	Answering Machine Other (voice)	3 episodes; uncredited
2026	Ponies	George H. W. Bush	Episode: "Second Hand News"
2026	Watson	Oliver Day/Harrison Day	Episode: "A Third Act Surprise"
2026	War	Eric McDaniel	2 episodes
2026	12 12 12 †	Kevin McNeil	Upcoming series

=== Podcasts ===
Year	Title	Role	Notes
2021–2022	Strange Air	Malcolm Smith (voice)	10 episodes

== Awards and nominations ==
Year	Award	Category	Work	Result
2021	Screen Actors Guild Awards	Outstanding Performance by an Ensemble in a Drama Series	Better Call Saul	Nominated
2022	Saturn Awards	Best Supporting Actor on Television	Better Call Saul	Nominated
2023	Screen Actors Guild Awards	Outstanding Performance by an Ensemble in a Drama Series	Better Call Saul	Nominated
