= Heart of the Storm (film) =

- Written by: V.R. McDade
- Story by: Doug Draizin; V.R. McDade
- Directed by: Charles Wilkinson
- Starring: Melissa Gilbert; Tom Cavanagh; Brian Wimmer; Azure Parsons
- Music by: Richard Bellis
- Country of origin: United States
- Original language: English

Production
- Executive producers: Mark Bacino; Jim Green
- Producers: Val Mcleroy; Albert J. Salzer
- Cinematography: Mark Mervis
- Editor: Peter Svab
- Running time: 92 minutes
- Production company: WalletSize Pictures

Original release
- Network: Lifetime
- Release: November 5, 2004

Heart of the Storm is a 2004 American made-for-television action thriller drama film directed by Charles Wilkinson, starring Melissa Gilbert and Tom Cavanagh. The film originally aired on the Lifetime cable network on November 22, 2004.

== Plot ==
The story focuses on a prison break that occurs during a hurricane. Three convicts – Juke, Tad and their leader Simpson – seek refuge in a family's small house and decide to hold them captive. The family begins to get along with the escaped prisoners until Tad and Simpson get into a fight. Simpson ends up shooting Tad, incapacitating him. When the father of the family comes home, he is also shot by Simpson. Juke tries to help the family escape Simpson's treachery, only to be wounded by a gunshot as well. The group decides to ignite hairspray with fire in an attempt to kill Simpson. Simpson survives the attack but has his face severely injured in the process, resulting in him tumbling over a staircase balcony to his death.

== Cast ==
- Melissa Gilbert as Cassie Broadbeck
- Tom Cavanagh as Simpson
- Brian Wimmer as Wayne Broadbeck
- Ritchie Montgomery as Tad
- Marcus Lyle Brown as Juke
- Azure Parsons as Hayley Broadbeck (credited as Azure Dawn)
- CiCi Hedgpeth as Nicole

== Production ==
Heart of the Storm was produced by Jim Green and WalletSize Pictures. Filming was originally set to take place in Canada, but favorable contract agreements with the Screen Actors Guild enabled Green to move production to New Orleans, where the film's story takes place. The film was directed by Charles Wilkinson, with V.R. McDade writing the script, Mark Morris as cinematographer, and Richard Bellis composing the music.

The entire cast were members of SAG.

== Release ==
The film released in Vancouver theaters for a single day prior to its world premiere at the Fort Lauderdale International Film Festival on November 5, 2004. It was presented on Lifetime on November 22.

At the 2005 Cannes Film Festival, it was included among the films for sale by Imagination Worldwide.

== Reception ==
Laura Kelly, reviewing at the Fort Lauderdale International Film Festival, found the film to be bland, criticizing its depiction of a hurricane and the family's preparedness for such a storm. Kelly rated it one star out of four. Frank Scheck, reviewing for The Hollywood Reporter, disliked the film, calling the script predictable and stating that the direction was lacking and unable to provide the necessary tension for the story. Scheck also commented that Cavanaugh was "miscast" as his performance was"unconvincing". VideoHound rated the film 1.5 out of 4 stars.
