= Darrow & Darrow =

American/Canadian mystery television film series

Darrow & Darrow is an American/Canadian series of mystery TV movies created by Phoef Sutton and starring Kimberly Williams-Paisley as idealistic lawyer Claire Darrow and Tom Cavanagh as Miles Strasburg, the Assistant District Attorney. The series airs on the Hallmark Movies & Mysteries channel in the US.

== Cast ==
=== Main ===
- Kimberly Williams-Paisley as Claire Darrow, an idealistic lawyer who fights cases she believes in
- Tom Cavanagh as Miles Strasburg, Assistant District Attorney
- Wendie Malick as Joanna Darrow, Claire's estranged mother who returns from New York City and re-enters her daughter's life
- Lilah Fitzgerald as Louise "Lou", Claire's young daughter

=== Recurring ===
- Barclay Hope as Raymond, a colleague of Claire's at Darrow & Darrow
- Antonio Cayonne as Chester, a computer expert who works at Darrow & Darrow
- Vincent Dangerfield as Scott, an investigator who works at Darrow & Darrow
- Gelsea Mae as Zoey Jihara, an ex-Marine who works at Darrow & Darrow
- Brandi Alexander as Winnie
- MacKenzie Porter as Phoebe, Miles' half sister and a singer
- Veena Sood as D.A. Ruth Ashland

== Production and filming ==
Parts of the first film were shot in Vancouver, British Columbia, Canada.

== Films ==
No.	Title	Directed by	Written by	Original release date
1	"Darrow & Darrow"	Peter DeLuise	Phoef Sutton	October 22, 2017
A jewelry store owner (Jan Bos) has large gambling debts with a Russian mob. He stages a robbery of his store in order to claim insurance money and tries to frame an ex-con donut shop owner (Kirby Morrow) for the crime. Claire takes his case, while her mother Joanna (Wendie Malick) returns from New York City having been wrongly fired from her law firm and tries to join her daughter's firm.
2	"Darrow & Darrow: In the Key of Murder"	Mel Damski	Phoef Sutton	May 6, 2018
Miles seeks Claire's help when his sister, singer Phoebe (MacKenzie Porter), is arrested for the murder of her controlling, rude producer Terry who she recently fired. He had retaliated by saying he owned her tracks and would destroy them. Evidence against Phoebe includes a phone call Terry made to his wife where he called out Phoebe's name before shots were heard. Phoebe is also found to have gunshot residue on her hands. Claire and Miles defend Phoebe while her colleagues, sound recordist Jonah (Geoff Gustafson), and back-up singer Norah (Leah Cairns), believe that Phoebe may have cracked under Terry's controlling behaviour.
3	"Darrow & Darrow: Body of Evidence"	Mel Damski	Phoef Sutton	October 14, 2018
Claire takes the case of Laura Graham (Jordana Largy) who is arrested and then convicted for her husband Tom Graham's alleged murder after she herself reported him missing. It has been a year since the incident but her husband's body remains missing and when the case is brought to Claire, she begins suspecting if he died at all. Claire now seeks to overturn the murder conviction and is assisted by Laura's former lawyer Guy Hanson (Matthew Harrison) who suggests there may be no leads to follow. As Claire works to develop the defense's case, Miles goes through a period of questioning his career as the ADA, working for the prosecution. Meanwhile, Claire tries to downplay her growing personal relationship with Miles and Joanna strikes an unlikely friendship with Lou's baseball coach, Coach Reed (Paul McGillion).
4	"Witness to Murder: A Darrow Mystery"	Michael Robison	Phoef Sutton	September 8, 2019
Joanna's former colleague, Cassie Piper, who had been instrumental in having Joanna fired and disbarred, seeks the services of Darrow & Darrow after realising her former boss Brian Herriman (Martin Cummins) is now trying to frame her for insider trading like he had done with Joanna. Herriman arranges a meeting with the Darrows who then witness an attack where the shooter injures Herriman and kills his paralegal James Morrison. Cassie now faces murder charges as evidence builds up against her. Claire becomes her defense attorney with Miles being the prosecuting lawyer. Claire realises that James Morrison may have been the real target as she digs deeper. Meanwhile, Claire becomes uncomfortable by the return of Miles' former girlfriend Detective Sara Lang (Michelle Harrison).
