= Snow (2004 film) =

- Written by: Rich Burns
- Directed by: Alex Zamm
- Starring: Tom Cavanagh; Ashley Williams; Patrick Fabian
- Theme music composer: David Lawrence
- Country of origin: United States

Production
- Producer: Kevin Lafferty
- Running time: 90 minutes

Original release
- Network: ABC
- Release: December 13, 2004

Related
- Snow 2: Brain Freeze

Snow is an American Christmas-themed film starring Tom Cavanagh and Ashley Williams that premiered on December 13, 2004 on the ABC television network, and was also shown on the ABC Family cable network later the same year. It was written by Rich Burns and directed by Alex Zamm.

Since 2004, Snow has become a staple on Freeform's annual 25 Days of Christmas programming block.

== Plot ==
Nick Snowden, who is really the son of Santa Claus, falls for Sandy Brooks, a pretty zookeeper who works at The San Ernesto Zoo from which he must rescue Buddy, a young reindeer who has not yet learned to fly. He needs her help to get Buddy out, so he follows her home.

Nick meets Lorna, the landlady and owner of the boarding house where Sandy stays. She thinks Nick is a tenant, gets to know him, and lets him stay in the boarding house. Nick meets Hector, whose mother, Isabel, is a postal worker. Hector figures out that Nick is Santa Claus. Nick meets Sandy and falls for her. Sandy falls for him too and is unaware that he is Santa Claus. She helps Nick get Buddy out of the zoo and back to the North Pole. Nick usually teleports himself in and out by mirror, but the only way the mirror works is by using North Pole snow.

Buck Seger is a hunter who works at the zoo and has a crush on Sandy. He sees Nick as a rival and researches that Buddy is from the North Pole. He plans to sell Buddy to a big-game hunter. Nick, Sandy, Hector, and Isabel chase Buck all over town and rescue Buddy and send him back to the North Pole. On Christmas, Nick has left Sandy a china doll in her bedroom, and she goes back to the North Pole with him.

== Cast ==
- Tom Cavanagh as Nick Snowden
- Ashley Williams as Sandy Brooks
- Patrick Fabian as Buck Seger

=== Other cast ===
- Bobb'e J. Thompson as Hector
- Jackie Burroughs as Lorna
- Leslie "Les" Carlson as Chester
- Karen Robinson as Isabel
- Paul Bates as Carl
- Adam Greydon Reid as Jordan
- Dan Willmott as Passenger #1
- Bubba as Security Guard #2
- Zie Souwand as Boy on Tour Bus
- Mark Breanne as Girl on Tour Bus
- Andrea Scott as Female Co-worker
- Michael Dunston as Man Dressed as Elf

== Reception ==
Susan Stewart of TV Guide Magazine gave the television film a 7/10, writing that the film is "merely cutesy" while Tom Cavanagh is "seriously cute, which helps as does a stable of amusing secondary characters and a touching lack of sentimentality".

== Sequel ==
The sequel, Snow 2: Brain Freeze, was released on December 14, 2008, as part of ABC Family's 25 Days of Christmas. The main cast from the first film reprise their roles in the sequel.

== See also ==
- List of Christmas films
- Santa Claus in film
