= Snow 2: Brain Freeze =

- Written by: Rich Burns
- Directed by: Mark Rosman
- Starring: Tom Cavanagh; Ashley Williams; Patrick Fabian
- Music by: Kenneth Burgomaster
- Country of origin: United States
- Original language: English

Production
- Producers: Tom Cox; Murray Ord; Jordy Randall
- Running time: 90 minutes

Original release
- Network: ABC Family
- Release: December 14, 2008

Snow 2: Brain Freeze is a television film starring Tom Cavanagh and Ashley Williams. It premiered on ABC Family on December 14, 2008 on their 25 Days of Christmas programming block. The made-for-television film is a sequel to the 2004 television film Snow.

== Plot ==
Just before Christmas, Nick Snowden, the son of Santa Claus, has his hands full so that all children can get their presents and celebrate the people of established traditions. This year he has Sandy, with whom he wanted to spend quiet holidays, but during the reindeer training, the reindeer have become too fat and cannot fly anymore. So he has to come up with something to get her in shape. Indirectly he blames Sandy for overfeeding the reindeer. After a fight, Nick makes an excursion with his magic mirror. He ends up in a garage and has such a hard landing that becomes unconscious and wakes up in a hospital. He has lost his memory and does not remember he is Santa Claus.

Sandy learns of the misfortune reported on television about the man without a memory. She desperately wants to travel to him but does not know how to use the mirror. She seeks advice in Santa's book and learns from Galfired, the book's guardian, that she must not confront Nick with the truth because otherwise, he could forget everything. He just had to find his memories again. With this clue, Sandy sets off, but she doesn't meet Nick in the clinic because even his nemesis, Buck Seger, has seen the news and decided to abduct Nicks to maintain his amnesia. With a ticket to Bolivia, he leaves the train station and makes his way back out of the dust. Luckily, Nick falls asleep, so he misses the train and meets Ryan, an orphan boy who seems to want to help. Ryan is a pickpocket and wants to take advantage of Nick for his purposes. In escaping the police, Nick gets into an old, vacant club. Here, the confused Henry Mays awaits him and tells him that this was once his club and he supposedly belonged to a secret society. He had been waiting for Nick for a long time, so he should bring him back to his old days again. Nick does not understand anything at first but becomes curious.

Looking for Nick, Sandy suddenly discovers Buddy, as the reindeer has followed her through the magic mirror. She hopes Buddy can help her find Nick; that succeeds, but Nick does not recognize her. Nevertheless, they are now following the mysterious clues of Henry Mays. To do this, they must kidnap the old man from his family so he can help them organize the Christmas party for him at his old club. Ryan also helps to get a tree and decorate it. Secretly, however, he hopes to pursue his passion as a pickpocket at the Christmas party. Henry is already getting the members of his ominous "caribou club" together, but everyone is saying goodbye contrary to expectations. So the four of them sit alone in a festively decorated hall.

Having discovered the reindeer tracks in the snow, Buck manages to travel through a mirror to the North Pole. There he ends up in the stable of reindeer and the house. There is the wish bag of Santa Claus. So he lets himself get this bundle of bills and is thrilled.

Meanwhile, it's almost Christmas Eve, and Sandy tries by all means that Nick remembers. She tells him how he got here after their fight. As proof, he should touch a mirror, but the magic no longer works, and Nick leaves. As soon as he is gone, Buck comes through the mirror, grabs Sandy, and kidnaps her. Henry and Ryan then try to find Nick and convince Sandy to bring him back. This succeeds because the portal opens when Nick once again touches the mirror after Ryan assures him that he only has to believe in it. For a brief moment, he sees pictures from his past and begins to remember. With Buddy, he travels through the mirror to the North Pole to save Sandy and Christmas. Once there, he has to deal with Buck, who is harnessing the reindeer to disappear with his sack of money. With Buddy's help, he pushes Buck through the mirror, where he also lands in the garage and now loses his memory.

Nick and Sandy return to Henry and Ryan, who are still waiting for the hoped-for mess in the club. Suddenly, Nick's parents pass through the mirror and explain that they would celebrate their Christmas here yearly. Everyone attends their best Christmas together, and Henry offers Ryan that he wants to take him. Nick and Sandy must now split up to bring their gifts to the people. Even in the sleigh, Sandy hands over her present and tells him about a little Santa suit and that they will have a child.

== Cast ==
- Tom Cavanagh as Nick Snowden / Santa Claus
- Ashley Williams as Sandy Brooks / Mrs. Claus
- Patrick Fabian as Buck Seger - the antagonist (the antagonist in the first film)

Secondary cast:

- Jonathan Holmes as Galfrid - the Claus' bookkeeper
- Alexander Conti as Ryan - a street thief who turns into a believer and helps Nick out
- Hal Williams as Henry Mays - an elderly man who was close friends with Nick's parents

Other cast:

- Lynley Hall as Hip Hop Teacher
- Janelle Cooper as Kaitlin Mays - the daughter of Henry
- Viv Leacock as Gustavo - a relative of Henry
- Chantal Perron as TV News Reporter
- Irene Karas as Nurse
- Patrick Richards as Drunk Guy
- Wally Houn as the hospital Janitor
- Ron Barge as Old Man
- Brian Martell as Business Man

== See also ==
- List of Christmas films
- Santa Claus in film
