= Alchemy (film) =

- Directed by: Evan Oppenheimer
- Written by: Evan Oppenheimer
- Produced by: Kenneth Schapiro
- Starring: Tom Cavanagh; Sarah Chalke
- Cinematography: Luke Geissbühler
- Edited by: Allison Eve Zell
- Music by: Peter Lurye
- Distributed by: Monarch Home Video
- Release date: April 25, 2005 (Tribeca Film Festival)
- Running time: 85 minutes
- Country: United States
- Language: English

Alchemy is a 2005 film written and directed by Evan Oppenheimer and starring Tom Cavanagh and Sarah Chalke. It premiered at the Tribeca Film Festival in 2005. The film did not have a wide release in movie theaters, so its big public premiere was on television, on ABC Family on October 7, 2005.

== Premise ==
A university computer scientist tries to make a woman fall in love with his interactive computer before she succumbs to a well-known lothario professor.

== Cast ==
- Tom Cavanagh as Mal Downey
- Sarah Chalke as Samantha Rose
- James Stacy Barbour as Dr. Troy Rollins
- Michael Ian Black as Jerry (voice)
- Illeana Douglas as KJ
- Nadia Dajani as Jane
- Logan Marshall-Green as Martin
- Wil Horneff as Dave
- Celeste Holm as Iris
- Shannon McGinnis as Barbara
- Anna Belknap as Marissa
- Tovah Feldshuh as Senior Editor
- Daphne Rubin-Vega as Belladonna Editor
- Susan Misner as Associate Editor
- Erik Palladino as Groom
