= Tom Cavanagh =

Canadian actor (born 1963)

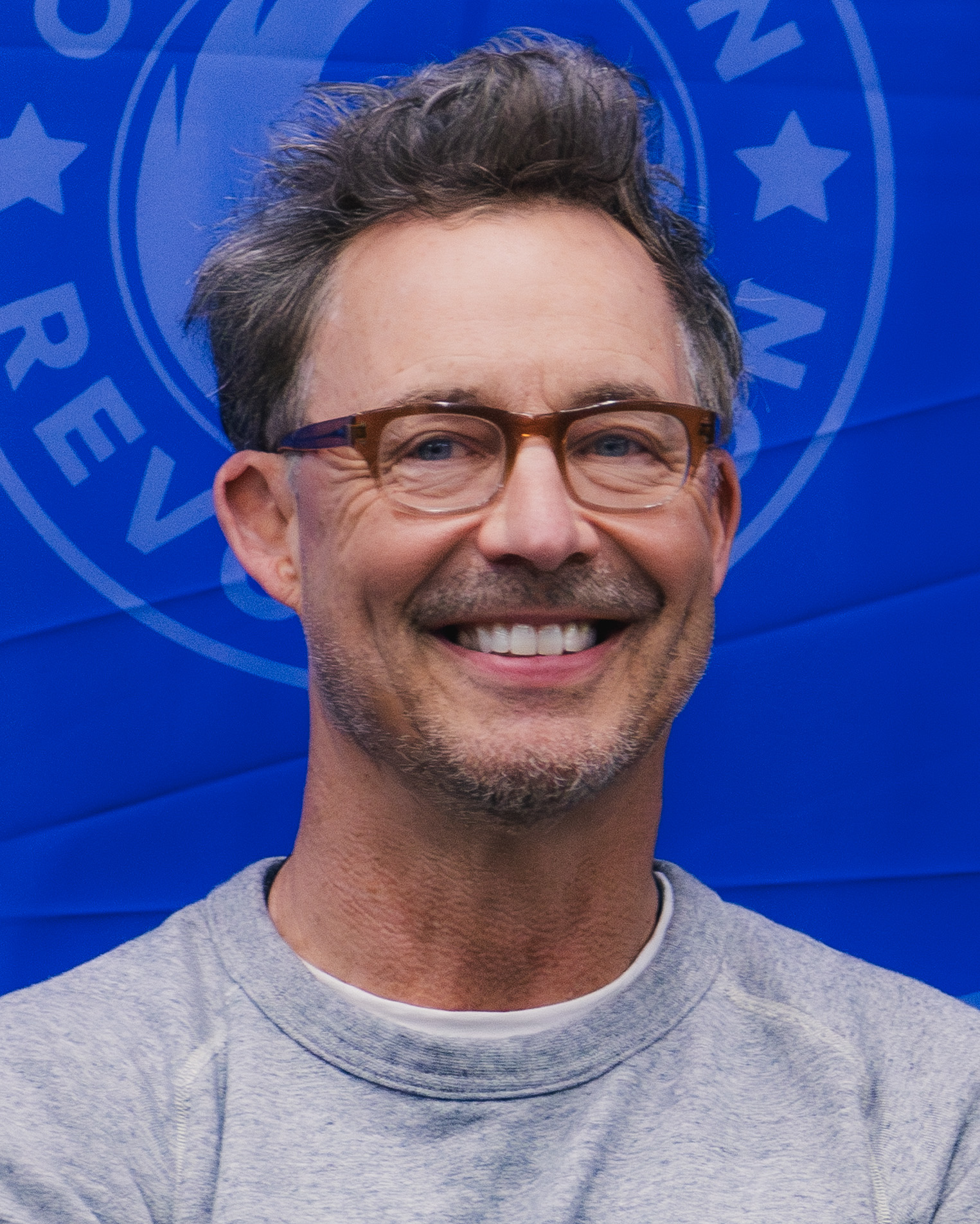
- Cavanagh in 2026
- Born: Thomas Cavanagh; October 26, 1963 (age 63); Ottawa, Ontario, Canada
- Education: Champlain College; Queen's University
- Occupation: Actor
- Years active: 1989–present
- Spouse: Maureen Grise (m. 2004)
- Children: 4

Thomas Cavanagh (born October 26, 1963) is a Canadian actor. He is known for a variety of roles on American television, including starring roles in Ed (2000–2004), Love Monkey (2006) and Trust Me (2009), and recurring roles on Providence and Scrubs. From 2014 to 2023, he portrayed Harrison Wells and Eobard Thawne / Reverse-Flash on The CW television series The Flash; Cavanagh also directed several episodes of The Flash. In 2023, he became the host of Hey Yahoo! on GSN.

== Early life ==
Thomas Cavanagh was born on October 26, 1963 (although some sources state 1968) in Ottawa, Ontario, to a Roman Catholic family of Irish descent. Cavanagh moved with his family to Winneba, a small city in Ghana, when he was a child.

In his teens, the family moved to Lennoxville, Quebec when his father became the Academic Dean of Champlain College. He attended the Séminaire de Sherbrooke, where he studied in French and played basketball for the Barons. He later studied at Champlain College in Lennoxville at the CEGEP level. While attending Queen's University, Kingston, Ontario, he became interested in theatre and music and played ice hockey and varsity basketball. He graduated in 1987 with degrees in English, biology, and education.

== Career ==
=== Commercial credits ===
Cavanagh acted in his native Canada for many years, appearing on television dramas such as Jake and the Kid in the late 1990s, and television commercials, appearing for Oh Henry! chocolate bars and Labatt Blue Light beer commercials in the 1990s and for CIBC.

=== Broadway roles ===
In 1989, he was cast in the Broadway revival of Shenandoah and in 2003 he starred as Bobby Strong in the Broadway cast of Urinetown. Other stage credits include productions of A Chorus Line, Cabaret, Brighton Beach Memoirs, and Grease. He appeared in the 2008 production of Some Americans Abroad at Second Stage Theatre in New York City.

=== Television performances ===
After gaining notice for his recurring role as Doug the Dog Guy in the NBC television program Providence, Cavanagh was cast as the title character in the NBC program Ed. Cavanagh received a Golden Globe nomination and a TV Guide Award for his work on Ed, which ran for four seasons beginning in October 2000 and concluding in February 2004.

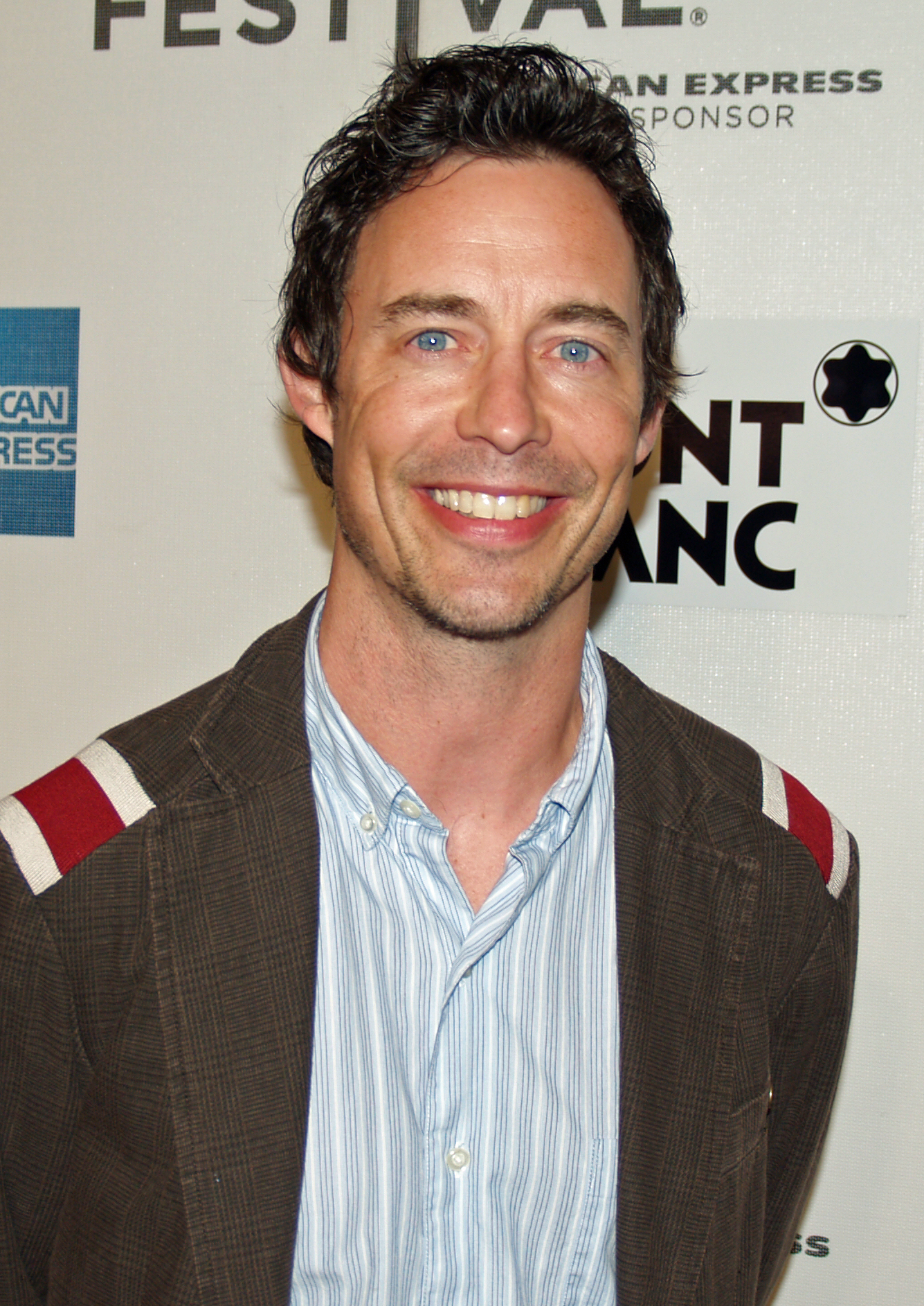
Cavanagh in April 2008

Cavanagh guest starred on the sitcom Scrubs where he played Dan Dorian, the brother of Zach Braff's character. He made six subsequent appearances in the series, starting with 2002's "My Big Brother" and culminating with the eighth season finale.

In 2005, Cavanagh filmed the pilot Love Monkey, with Jason Priestley, Judy Greer and Larenz Tate. The show was selected by CBS as a midseason replacement and debuted on January 17, 2006. Love Monkey was given an eight-episode order, but only three aired on CBS before the show was placed on indefinite hiatus due to low ratings. VH1 bought all eight episodes which was played in the entirety in the spring of 2006.

He starred in the Lifetime Movie Network television miniseries The Capture of the Green River Killer in which he portrayed King County sheriff David Reichert. In March 2006, Cavanagh filmed My Ex-Life, a comedy pilot for CBS about a divorced couple who remain friends. The pilot featured Lost actress Cynthia Watros as his character's ex-wife. CBS did not select the show for its fall 2006 schedule. Cavanagh portrayed the lead role Nick Snowden (the heir to the Santa Claus identity) in the made-for-TV movie Snow in 2004.

In 2008, Cavanagh appeared in the short-lived ABC series Eli Stone, playing the father of the title character. From January to April 2009, Cavanagh starred in the television drama Trust Me, co-starring Eric McCormack, which aired on TNT until cancellation due to low ratings.

Cavanagh hosted Stories from the Vaults on Smithsonian Networks from 2008 to 2009. He made a guest appearance in the mid-season premiere of the USA Network show Royal Pains as former professional golfer Jack O'Malley. In 2012, he starred in Lifetime's A Killer Among Us remake.

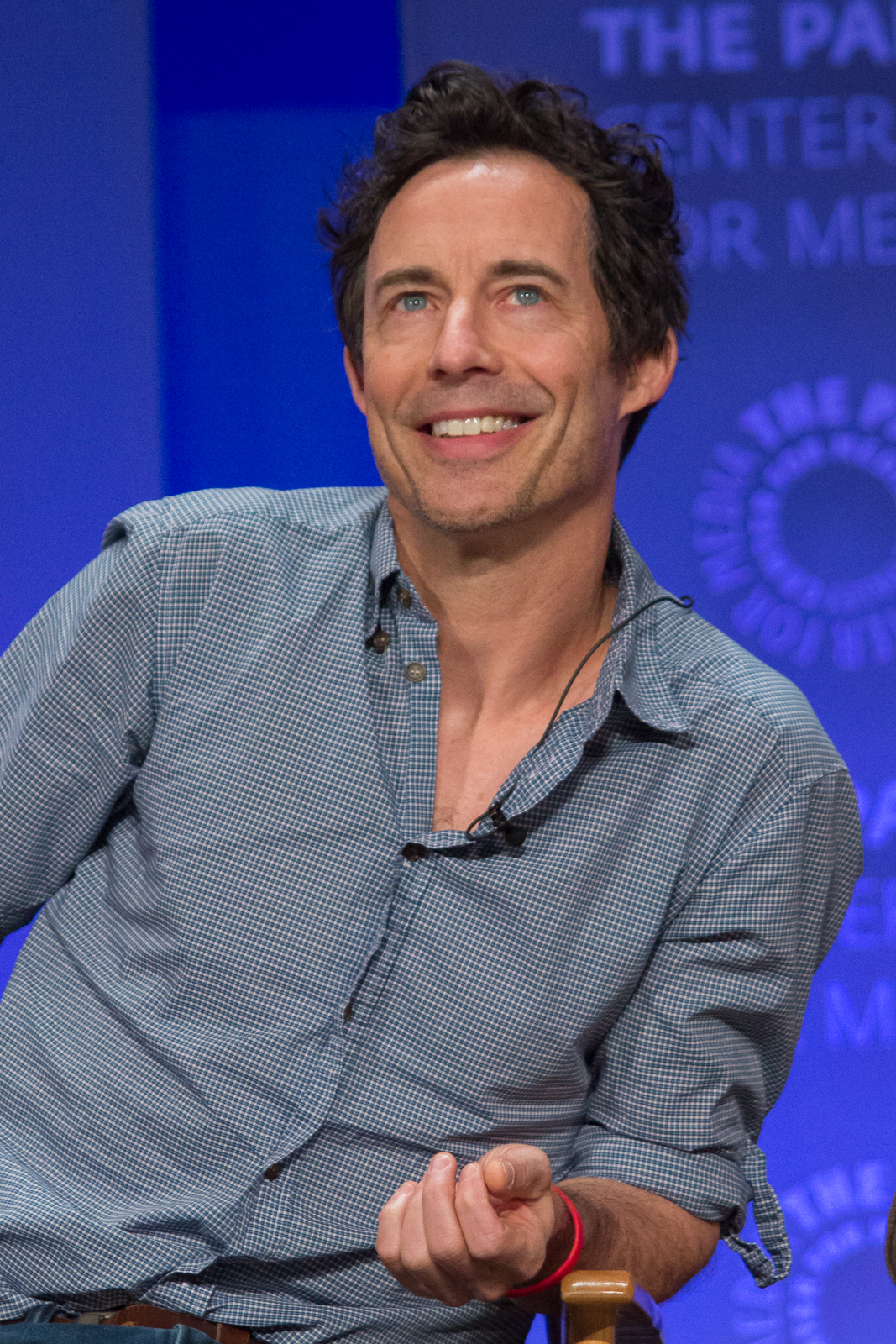
Cavanagh at the 2015 Paley Fest

From 2014 to 2021, Cavanagh was a series regular on The CW's live-action television series The Flash, portraying Harrison Wells; most notably Eobard Thawne / Reverse-Flash impersonating the Earth-1 version in conjunction with several different doppelgängers, such as Earth-2's Harry, Earth-19 writer H. R., Earth-221 detective Sherloque, and explorer Nash (also known as Pariah). He was a regular cast member for the first seven seasons, and made guest appearances in the final two. In 2023, Cavanagh began hosting the game show Hey Yahoo!.

=== Film performances ===
Cavanagh starred in the 2002 film Bang Bang You're Dead. Prior to Ed, Cavanagh's film appearances were mainly in supporting roles. After that series ended, he had his first starring role as an escaped convict in the thriller Heart of the Storm. In 2005, he starred in the romantic comedy Alchemy, opposite Sarah Chalke; in 2006, he appeared in another romantic comedy, Gray Matters.

In 2006, Cavanagh began filming Breakfast with Scot, in which he plays a gay retired hockey player who becomes an adoptive father to a young boy. The film, released in 2007, drew attention as the first gay-themed film ever to win approval from a major league sports franchise to use its real name and logo; Cavanagh's character formerly played for the Toronto Maple Leafs. In 2007, he starred in the second installment of the direct-to-DVD Raw Feed horror film series from Warner Home Video, Sublime. In 2008, Cavanagh starred in the Crime/Drama The Capture of the Green River Killer. He also starred as Ranger Smith in the feature film Yogi Bear (2010).

=== Podcast ===
From 2010 until 2016, Cavanagh co-hosted the podcast Mike and Tom Eat Snacks, with his Ed castmate Michael Ian Black, on the Nerdist Podcast Network. They re-launched the podcast in August 2021 on the Starburns Audio podcast network until going on hiatus again in early 2023. They re-relaunched the podcast in September 2025 as part of the Realm podcast network.

== Personal life ==
Cavanagh married Maureen Grise, an image editor for Sports Illustrated, on July 31, 2004, in a Catholic ceremony on Nantucket, Massachusetts. The couple has two daughters and two sons.

Cavanagh ran the 2006 New York City Marathon.

In summer 2008, he founded the Cavanagh Classic, an annual celebrity basketball tournament in Rucker Park in Harlem to raise money and awareness for Nothing But Nets. The charity's goal is to combat malaria by sending mosquito nets to families that need them. Cavanagh travelled to Rwanda on a March 2009 United Nations Foundation trip to distribute the nets and educate the recipients in their use.

== Filmography ==
=== Film ===
Year	Title	Role	Notes
1991	White Light	Ella's Secretary	
1995	Dangerous Intentions	Ron	
1995	Magic in the Water	Simon	
1996	Mask of Death	Joey	
1996	Midnight Heat	Bowlan	
1996	Profile for Murder	Tim Jonas	
1997	Honeymoon	Jamie	
1999	Something More	Harry	
2005	Alchemy	Mal Downey	
2006	How to Eat Fried Worms	Mitch Forrester	
2006	Two Weeks	Barry Bergman	
2006	Gray Matters	Sam Baldwin	
2007	Sublime	George Grieves	
2007	The Cake Eaters	Lloyd	
2007	Breakfast with Scot	Eric McNally	
2010	Yogi Bear	Ranger John Smith	
2013	The Birder	Ron Spencer	
2014	The Games Maker	Mr. Drago	
2015	400 Days	Zell	
2016	Sidekick	Darkman	
2016	Offer and Compromise	Henry Warner	
2019	Love & Debt	Henry Warner	
2022	Corrective Measures	Gordon Tweedy	
2026	Don't Move	Pastor Rizzo	

=== Television ===
Year	Title	Role	Notes
1993	Secret Service	Charlie	1 episode
1993	Beyond Reality	N/A	1 episode
1993	Sherlock Holmes Returns	Rookie Cop	Television film
1993	Other Women's Children	Marco	Television film
1994	Street Legal	Dr. Peter Shenfield	1 episode
1995	Madison	Jesus	1 episode
1995, 1999	The Outer Limits	Carl Toman, Vance Ridout	2 episodes
1995	Hawkeye	Corporal Charles Sykes	1 episode
1995	A Vow to Kill	Jacey Jeffries	Television film
1997	Jake and the Kid	Paul Krause	Main role (season 2)
1996	Bloodhounds II	Levesh	Television film
1997	The Sentinel	Bill Collins	1 episode
1997	Northern Lights	Frank	Television film
1998	Cold Squad	Spencer Taggart	1 episode
1998	Viper	Charles Bennett	1 episode
1998	Eyes of a Cowboy	Lonesome Cooper	1 episode
1998	Twisteeria	Live Action Man	Television film
1998	The 900 Lives of Jackie Frye	Jackie Frye	Television film
1999	Mentors	Lewis Carroll	1 episode
1999–2000	Providence	Doug Boyce	Recurring role, 8 episodes
1999	Oh, Grow Up	Bruce	1 episode
1999	Anya's Bell	Patrick Birmingham	Television film
1999–2000	Sports Night	Howard	2 episodes
2000–2004	Ed	Ed Stevens	Lead role, 83 episodes
2002	Bang Bang You're Dead	Val Duncan	Television film
2002–2009	Scrubs	Dan Dorian	Recurring role, 7 episodes
2004	Jack & Bobby	Jimmy McCallister	2 episodes
2004	Heart of the Storm	Simpson	Television film
2004	Snow	Nick Snowden	Television film
2006	Love Monkey	Tom Farrell	Main role, 8 episodes
2006	My Ex Life	Nick	Television film
2008	Snow 2: Brain Freeze	Nick Snowden	Television film
2008	The Capture of the Green River Killer	Dave Reichert	Television miniseries
2008–2009	Eli Stone	Jeremy Stone	Recurring role, 7 episodes
2009	Trust Me	Conner	Main role
2009	Christmas Dreams	Eli	Television film
2010	Edgar Floats	Edgar Floats	Television film
2011	Trading Christmas	Charles Johnson	Television film
2011–2012	Royal Pains	Jack O'Malley	Recurring role, 7 episodes
2012	A Killer Among Us	Nick Carleton	Television film
2013	Doc McStuffins	Big Jack	Voice role; 1 episode
2013	The Goldbergs	Charles Kremp	1 episode
2013, 2023	Blue Bloods	Mickey Patrick	Episodes: "Ties That Bind", "The Big Leagues"
2014	Lucky Duck	Snap	Voice role; television film
2014	The Following	Kingston Tanner	4 episodes
2014	Undateable	Frank	1 episode
2014–2023	The Flash	Harrison Wells / Pariah, Eobard Thawne / Reverse-Flash / The Flash	Main role (seasons 1–7); recurring role (seasons 7-8); guest role (season 9)
2015	Robot Chicken	Eobard Thawne	Voice role; episode: "Ants on a Hamburger"
2016	Van Helsing	Micah	1 episode
2017	Darrow & Darrow	Miles	Television film
2017, 2019	Supergirl	Harrison Wells / Pariah, Eobard Thawne	Episodes: "Crisis on Earth-X", "The Wrath of Rama Khan" (cameo), "Crisis on Infinite Earths"
2017–2019	Arrow	Harrison Wells, Eobard Thawne / Reverse-Flash	Episodes: "Crisis on Earth-X", "Purgatory" (cameo), "Elseworlds"
2017, 2020	Legends of Tomorrow	Harrison Wells, Eobard Thawne / Reverse-Flash	Crossover episodes: "Crisis on Earth-X", "Crisis on Infinite Earths"
2018	Darrow & Darrow: In the Key of Murder	Miles	Television film
2018	Darrow & Darrow: Body of Evidence	Miles	Television film
2019	Witness to Murder: A Darrow Mystery	Miles	Television film
2019	Batwoman	Nash Wells	Episode: "A Mad Tea-Party" (cameo)
2023	Hey Yahoo (Game Show)	Host	Game Show
2024	Superman & Lois	Gordon Godfrey	Episode: "Sharp Dressed Man"
2024	Mistletoe Murders	Glenn Shaw	2 episodes
2025	FBI	Philip	2 episodes
2026	You're Killing Me	Jack Kerrigan	6 episodes

=== Video games ===
Year	Title	Role
2010	Yogi Bear: The Video Game	Ranger Smith
2025	Marvel's Deadpool VR	Mephisto

=== As a director ===
- Ed (2000–2004) – three episodes
- The Flash (2017–2018) – episodes: "The Once and Future Flash", "Elongated Journey Into Night" and the 100th episode, "What's Past Is Prologue".
- Superman & Lois (2021–2023) – two episodes: "Last Sons of Krypton", "Closer".
