= Confidence tricks in film and television =

Fictional portrayals of confidence tricks

This is a list of fictional portrayals of confidence tricks found in television and the movies.

== 1930s ==
- Blonde Crazy (1931) – directed by Roy Del Ruth; the main character, Bert Harris (James Cagney), is a con artist.
- The Phantom President (1932) – directed by Norman Taurog; the main character, Doc Varney (George M. Cohan), is a con artist.
- Trouble in Paradise (1932) – directed by Ernst Lubitsch; the main character, Gaston Monescu (Herbert Marshall), is a con artist.
- Steamboat Round the Bend (1935) – directed by John Ford.
- Lord Jeff (1938) – directed by Sam Wood.

== 1940s ==
- My Little Chickadee (1940) – directed by Edward F. Cline; Cuthbert J. Twillie (W.C. Fields), is a con artist.
- The Lady Eve (1941) – directed by Preston Sturges; the main character, Jean Harrington (Barbara Stanwyck), is a con artist.
- Rings on Her Fingers (1942) – directed by Rouben Mamoulian.
- Jitterbugs (1943) – directed by Malcolm St. Clair.
- Belle of the Yukon (1944) – directed by William A. Seiter; Honest John Calhoun (Randolph Scott), is a con artist.
- Nightmare Alley (1947) – directed by Edmund Goulding; Stan Carlisle (Tyrone Power), is a con artist.
- The Third Man (1949) – directed by Carol Reed; Harry Lime (Orson Welles), is a con artist.

== 1950s ==
- Racket Squad (1951–1953) – TV series in the style of Dragnet with all episodes focused on confidence crimes.
- When in Rome (1952) – directed by Clarence Brown; Joe Brewster (Paul Douglas), is a con artist.
- Abbott and Costello Meet the Keystone Kops (1955) – directed by Charles Lamont; Joseph Gorman (Fred Clark), is a con artist.
- The Night of the Hunter (1955) – directed by Charles Laughton; Harry Powell (Robert Mitchum), is a con artist.
- The Rainmaker (1956) – directed by Joseph Anthony; the main character, Bill Starbuck (Burt Lancaster), is a con artist.
- Witness for the Prosecution (1957) – directed by Billy Wilder.

== 1960s ==
- Elmer Gantry (1960) – directed by Richard Brooks; the main character, Elmer Gantry (Burt Lancaster) is a con artist.
- The Music Man (1962) – produced and directed by Morton DaCosta; the main character, Harold Hill (Robert Preston), is a con artist.
- Bedtime Story (1964) – directed by Ralph Levy; the main characters, Lawrence Jamieson (David Niven) and Freddy Benson (Marlon Brando), are con artists. Remade as Dirty Rotten Scoundrels (1988). (See below.)
- A Big Hand for the Little Lady (1966) – starring Henry Fonda, Joanne Woodward, Paul Ford, Jason Robards, Charles Bickford, Burgess Meredith, Kevin McCarthy, Robert Middleton, and John Qualen.
- Mission: Impossible (1966–73 TV series, revived 1988–1989) – missions in the various episodes usually take the form of elaborate con games in which the villains are the marks; series writer William Read Woodfield was a self-professed confidence enthusiast and had read David Maurer's books on the subject.
- The Flim-Flam Man (1967) – directed by Irvin Kershner; the main character, Mordecai Jones (George C. Scott), is a con artist.
- The Producers (1967) – written and directed by Mel Brooks; the main characters, Max Bialystock (Zero Mostel) and Leopold Bloom (Gene Wilder), are (incompetent) con artists.
- Midnight Cowboy (1969) – directed by John Schlesinger; the main character, Ratso Rizzo (Dustin Hoffman) is a small-time con artist.

== 1970s ==
- Skin Game (1971) – directed by Paul Bogart; the main characters, Quincy Drew (James Garner) and Jason O'Rourke (Louis Gossett Jr.), con people.
- Paper Moon (1973) – directed by Peter Bogdanovich; a con-man (Ryan O'Neal) and a young girl (Tatum O'Neal) travel around the United States, engaging in a variety of confidence schemes.
- The Sting (1973) – directed by George Roy Hill; two professional grifters, Johnny Hooker (Robert Redford) and Henry Gondorff (Paul Newman) try to con a mob boss.
- A Touch of Class (1975) - the first episode of "Fawlty Towers", a BBC Television sitcom. A confidence trickster (Michael Gwynn) attempts various schemes on Basil Fawlty (John Cleese).
- Family Plot (1976) – directed by Alfred Hitchcock; the main characters, Fran (Karen Black) and George Lumley (Bruce Dern) are con artists.

== 1980s ==
- Annie (1982) - Danny "Rooster" Hannigan, Agatha Hannigan's brother is a con artist who attempts to convince billionaire Oliver Warbucks that he and his sister are Annie's parents.
- Remington Steele (1982-1987, TV) - created by Robert Butler and Michael Gleason; though the title character is actually nonexistent, a con man (Pierce Brosnan) assumes his identity.
- The A-Team (1983–1987, TV) – created by Frank Lupo and Stephen J. Cannell; con tricks are performed mostly by team member Templeton Peck, played by Dirk Benedict.
- The Sting II (1983) – sequel to the 1973 film.
- The Last Starfighter (1984) – directed by Nick Castle; featured Robert Preston as the interstellar con man Centauri, whose character was a nod to Preston's portrayal of Harold Hill in the 1962 film The Music Man.
- House of Games (1987) – directed by David Mamet; features con artists as main characters.
- The Vanishing (1988) – directed by George Sluizer; the main character is a victim of a confidence trick; a remake was released in 1993.
- Dirty Rotten Scoundrels (1988) – directed by Frank Oz; Freddy Benson (Steve Martin,) a traveling grifter, and Lawrence Jamieson (Michael Caine), a professional con artist, are competing for territory in France. A remake of Bedtime Story (1964). (See above.)
- Cheers – TV series – Harry Anderson's character, "Harry the Hat," was an annoying con artist.

== 1990s ==
- The Grifters (1990) – directed by Stephen Frears; the story of Lilly Dillon (Anjelica Huston), a con artist.
- Diggstown (1992) – directed by Michael Ritchie; the main character, Gabriel Caine (James Woods), is a con man.
- Six Degrees of Separation (1993) – directed by Fred Schepisi; the plot was inspired by the real-life story of David Hampton, a con man.
- Maverick (1994) – directed by Richard Donner; Mel Gibson, Jodie Foster and James Garner play con artists and gamblers all aiming for the same big score.
- The Jerky Boys (1995) – directed by James Melkonian; Johnny B and Kamal, as themselves, are con men.
- The Usual Suspects (1995) – directed by Bryan Singer; the unreliable narrator, who calls himself Roger "Verbal" Kint (Kevin Spacey), is supposedly a con man.
- Tommy Boy (1995) – Rob Lowe and Bo Derek as two con artists.
- Traveller (1997) – Bokky (Bill Paxton) is a confidence man.
- Shooting Fish (1997) – co-stars Dan Futterman and Stuart Townsend are two con men.
- The Spanish Prisoner (1997) – directed by David Mamet; named after the confidence game "Spanish Prisoner."
- The Pest (1997) – Pestario 'Pest' Vargas (John Leguizamo) is a Latino con man.
- The Talented Mr. Ripley (1999) – directed by Anthony Minghella; Tom Ripley (Matt Damon) is a con artist.
- Ed, Edd n Eddy (1999) – directed by Danny Antonucci; three main characters spend their time scamming other kids to get money in order to buy jawbreakers.
- Bowfinger (1999) - directed by Frank Oz; the film revolves around the scam set up by Steve Martin's character to film a movie with a famed action star without his consent or knowledge.
- The movies F/X and F/X2 and the TV spin-off F/X: The Series – each center on a group of special effects specialists helping the law authorities often using cons in the forms of elaborate special effects during the climax to draw the criminals, similar to the cons pulled off by the IMF team in Mission: Impossible.

== 2000s ==
- Boiler Room (2000) – directed by Ben Younger; Giovanni Ribisi plays entry-level investment broker working in a boiler room operation as part of a microcap stock fraud, with Ben Affleck and Vin Diesel.
- The Road to El Dorado (2000) – an animated film about two Spanish con men named Miguel and Tulio who discover a secret map that leads to the lost City of Gold, El Dorado.
- Nine Queens (Nueve Reinas) (2000) – directed by Fabián Bielinsky; tells the story of two con artists who meet by chance and decide to cooperate in a scam; remade as Criminal (2004).
- The Prime Gig (2000) – directed by Gregory Mosher; Pendelton "Penny" Wise (Vince Vaughn) is a con artist.
- Birthday Girl (2001) – directed by Jez Butterworth; the main character, John Buckingham (Ben Chaplin), is a victim of a scam based on the con.
- Heist (2001) – directed by David Mamet; the plot is based on a confidence game.
- Heartbreakers (2001 film) – directed by David Mirkin; Max (Sigourney Weaver) and Page Conners (Jennifer Love Hewitt) are a mother-daughter con artist team.
- Ocean's Eleven (2001) (remake of the 1960 film by Lewis Milestone) and sequels Ocean's Twelve (2004) and Ocean's Thirteen (2007) – directed by Steven Soderbergh; films about con artists and the con.
- The Score (2001) – directed by Frank Oz; the main characters try to con one another.
- Catch Me If You Can (2002) – directed by Steven Spielberg; story about real-life con artist and impostor Frank Abagnale.
- The Wire (TV series) (2002) – created by David Simon; Isiah Whitlock plays a corrupt Maryland State Senator named Clay Davis who illegally collects money from Baltimore City drug dealers after conning them to believe their money is being invested; drug dealer Stringer Bell played by Idris Elba does not realize that the Senator is conning him until his lawyer claims that he has been "rain made" by Davis' confidence scheme.
- Monk (2002–2009) – created by Andy Breckman; the show has several episodes that involve con tricks. One episode, "Mr. Monk Is Up All Night," features a rather unusual example of the paranoia scam.
- Confidence (2003) – directed by James Foley; a group of con artists attempt to rip off a corrupt bank president.
- Matchstick Men (2003) – directed by Ridley Scott; the main characters are con artists.
- Shade (2003) – directed by Damian Nieman; story about poker hustlers who try to con other players.
- Hustle (2004–2012) – a BBC series about a team of con artists.
- Criminal (2004) – directed by Gregory Jacobs; about a team of con artists.
- Lost (2004) – TV series – two characters, James "Sawyer" Ford and Anthony Cooper, are both con artists.
- A Con (2005) – created by a con artist Skyler Stone, who reveals the secrets of his profession by performing confidence tricks, scams, and hoaxes.
- Revolver (2005) – directed by Guy Ritchie; one of the main characters, Jake Green (Jason Statham), is a con artist, and the premise of the film is a con.
- Bluffmaster (2005) – directed by Rohan Sippy; the main character, Roy, is a professional con man.
- Colour Me Kubrick (2006) – directed by Brian W. Cook; based on a true story of Alan Conway, who posed as director Stanley Kubrick.
- House of Payne (2006) – created by Tyler Perry – the character Miranda Lucas Payne is a con artist.
- Lucky Number Slevin (2006) – directed by Paul McGuigan; main character, Slevin Kelevra (Josh Hartnett) performs an elaborate con as a revenge.
- The Real Hustle (2006–2012) – BBC series; actors playing a team of ex-grifters explain the secrets of the con to the public.
- Kurosagi (2006) – Japanese drama, starring Yamashita Tomohisa, that reflects on the art of different cons and swindling methods.
- Viva Pinata (2007) – features a character "The Bonboon" who is constantly pulling tricks on pinatas to get candy.
- Believe (2007) – directed by Loki Mulholland; a mockumentary about multi-level marketing.
- The Riches (2007) – FX series about a nomadic family of grifters.
- Liar Game (2007) – Japanese drama which is about an honest college student, receives 100 million yen (about $1,000,000) one day, along with a card saying that she has been chosen to participate in the "Liar Game;" in order to win the game, she must trick other players.
- Futurama: Bender's Big Score (2007) – film based on the TV series of the same name; the villains of the film are Internet scammers.
- Burn Notice (2007–2013) – USA Network series; an ex covert operative works as a freelance spy, with his jobs often taking the form of a con.
- Leverage (2008–2012) – TNT series; a group of criminals led by a former insurance investigator pull off sophisticated cons against other criminals to help others.
- The Brothers Bloom (2009) – directed by Rian Johnson. Two con artist brothers work to con an eccentric woman.
- I Love You Phillip Morris (2009) – film based on the 1980s and 1990s real-life story of con artist, impostor, and multiple prison escapee Steven Jay Russell, as played by Jim Carrey.
- White Collar (2009–2014) – USA Network series; an art forger is pulled from federal prison to assist the FBI in solving white-collar crimes.

== 2010s ==
- Inception (2010) - directed by Christopher Nolan. A team of con artists use specialized technology to either steal information from, or implant ideas into, a targeted person's subconscious during a shared dream experience.
- American Hustle (2013) - directed by David O. Russell - based on the FBI's 1970s and 1980s "Abscam" sting, of which it is described as a "fictionalization;" Irving Rosenfeld (Christian Bale) and Sydney Prosser (Amy Adams) are con artists whom FBI agent Richie DiMaso (Bradley Cooper) forces to participate in a similar law-enforcement sting to Abscam.
- Better Call Saul (2015) - created by Vince Gilligan and Peter Gould. AMC prequel series to Breaking Bad, explaining the back story of con-man-turned-lawyer Saul Goodman; in particular, the episode "Marco" includes a montage which is a protracted litany of key lines from many different confidence scams.
- Focus (2015) - directed by Glenn Ficarra and John Requa; a film about con artists
- Zootopia - In a city of anthropomorphic animals, a rookie bunny cop and a cynical con artist fox must work together to uncover a conspiracy.
- Pocket Listing (2016) - directed by Conor Allyn. The film follows a down on his luck Los Angeles realtor (James Jurdi) who is hired by a shady Hollywood couple (Rob Lowe and Jessica Clark ) to discreetly market and sell a sprawling Malibu villa, a deal which of course results in double crosses, adultery, murder, mayhem, and pretty much every illegal activity under the sun.
- Squad 38 (2016) - A South Korean television series which involves team of con artists who collect unpaid taxes from millionaires by swindling them, and returning it to the Tax Collection Bureau. Starring Seo In-guk as leader of con-artists, Ma Dong-seok as manager of Tax Collection Bureau's Section 3, and Sooyoung of Girl's Generation as Tax Collection Bureau's team member.
- Sneaky Pete (2017) - created by David Shore and Bryan Cranston. The series follows Marius Josipovic (Giovanni Ribisi), a released convict who adopts the identity of his cell mate, Pete Murphy, in order to avoid his past life. In his new life Pete runs multi-layered confidence tricks with different partners.
- The Good Liar (2019) – directed by Bill Condon; the main character, Roy Courtnay (Ian McKellen), is a con artist.

== See also ==
- Confidence trick
- List of Books and Other Literature Featuring Confidence Tricks
- Heist film
