= Kaz (TV series) =

- Created by: Ron Leibman; Don Carlos Dunaway
- Starring: Ron Leibman; Mark Withers; Linda Carlson; George Wyner; Dick O'Neill; Patrick O'Neal; Edith Atwater; Gloria LeRoy
- Composer: Fred Karlin
- Country of origin: United States
- Original language: English
- No. of seasons: 1
- No. of episodes: 22 + pilot

Production
- Executive producers: Lee Rich; Marc Merson
- Running time: 60 minutes
- Production company: Lorimar Productions

Original release
- Network: CBS
- Release: September 10, 1978 – April 18, 1979

Kaz is an American crime drama and courtroom drama series that aired Sundays at 10:00 pm and Wednesdays at 9:00 pm (EST) on CBS from September 10, 1978, to April 18, 1979. After the final first-run telecast, the series returned in reruns on Sundays, July 29, August 5 & August 19, 1979.

== Overview ==
Ron Leibman starred as Martin "Kaz" Kazinski, a Polish American former convict who became a criminal defense attorney after he was released from prison. Leibman won an Emmy Award as Outstanding Lead Actor in a drama. Nevertheless, the show failed to capture an audience and was cancelled after 22 episodes due to middling ratings. The show ranked 53rd out of 114 shows that season with an average 17.0/28 rating/share. In her 2019 memoir, Demi Moore wrote that she got her first acting role in a bit part on this show playing a teen prostitute.

== Cast ==
- Ron Leibman as Martin "Kaz" Kazinski
- Patrick O'Neal as Samuel Bennett
- Linda Carlson as Katie McKenna
- Dick O'Neill as Malloy
- Edith Atwater as Illsa Fogel
- Gloria LeRoy as Mary Parnell
- Mark Withers as Peter Colcourt
- George Wyner as District Attorney Frank Revko

== Episodes ==
No.	Title	Directed by	Written by	Original release date
1	"Kaz (untitled pilot episode)"	Russ Mayberry	Don Carlos Dunaway & Ron Leibman & Sam Rolfe	September 10, 1978
Series pilot: Martin "Kaz" Kazinski is released from prison after 6 years where he earned his law degree. His idol Sam Bennett (Patrick O'Neal), the senior partner of a top law firm, recommends him for a mugging case which looks like a career dead end. Also stars Erik Kilpatrick, Nicholas Pryor and Sharon Cintron.
2	"Verdict in Department 12"	Bob Kelljan	Preston Wood & William Wood	September 24, 1978
A cantankerous judge throws Kaz in jail on a contempt of court charge. Also stars Eugene Roche, Al Stellone and Kenneth Tigar.
3	"A Case of Class"	Harvey S. Laidman	Stanley Roberts	October 1, 1978
The firm head Sam tries to defend a long-time friend who works as an investment counselor and has been accused of embezzling from his clients. Kaz has doubts about his innocence. Also stars Martin Garner, Ruth Manning and Barry Nelson.
4	"The Slow Man"	Unknown	Martin Roth	October 8, 1978
An accused murderer's only defense depends on a mentally disabled young man. Also stars Donegan Smith, Lane Binkley and Philip Levien.
5	"No Way to Treat the Lady"	Harvey S. Laidman	Robert W. Lenski	October 15, 1978
The firm's head Sam asks Kaz to defend an intimate woman friend charged with hit-and-run traffic accident. Also stars Shannon Wilcox, Matthew Tobin and Robin Gammell.
6	"Who's on First... and Sixth?"	David Moessinger	Oliver Crawford	October 29, 1978
After a pitcher is charged with assault and battery, Kaz attempts to arrange a quick and quiet settlement before the situation blows up to uncontrollable proportions. Also stars Leonard Stone and David Wilson.
7	"Which Side Are You On?"	Nicholas Colasanto	Ron Leibman	November 5, 1978
In the midst of a riot at the prison where Kaz was once incarcerated, he is asked by his former fellow inmates to represent them in presenting their grievances. Also stars Robert Webber, John Calvin, Lawrence Cook, Claude Earl Jones, Sydney Lassick and Antonio Fargas.
8	"In a Safe Place"	Unknown	Michael Berlin & Al Nierenberg	November 26, 1978
The District Attorney's public campaign against the city's gang crime problem wants to make an example of a first time offending minor who Kaz wants to defend. Also stars Joseph Bernard, Warren J. Kemmerling, K Callan, Glenn Withrow, Ray Girardin and Audrey Peters.
9	"A Fine Romance"	Unknown	Carol Roper	December 3, 1978
Kaz gets called to duty to defend an old lady shoplifter who was a famous movie star. Also stars Pamela Susan Shoop and Sylvia Sidney.
10	"Kaz and the Kid"	Unknown	Warren Miller	December 17, 1978
The daughter of a top level racetrack handicapper becomes the temporary ward of Kaz while her father puts in action a scheme to raise funds for his wife's bail. Also stars Morgan Paull, Katy Kurtzman, Marian Mercer, Suzanne Lederer and George O. Petrie.
11	"A Little Shuck and a Whole Lotta Jive"	Harvey S. Laidman	R.W. Goodwin	January 14, 1979
Kaz finds himself in the middle of a murder case involving two old jam-session friends: the victim and his confessed killer. Also stars Rod Browning, Jessica Harper, Guy Boyd and Carol Lawrence.
12	"A Case of Murder"	Don Medford	Michael Genelin	January 17, 1979
Kaz has to battle his firm's own client charged with murder while trying to find a mystery witness. Also stars Warren J. Kemmerling, Sam Groom, Patch Mackenzie and Joel Bailey.
13	"Conspiracy in Blue" "The Blue Mafia"	Unknown	Al Nierenberg & Barney Slater	January 24, 1979
When two police officers are accused of gunning down an unarmed man, Kaz gets involved in their defense. Also stars Julie Cobb, Mario Roccuzzo, Randolph Powell, Dolph Sweet, Arthur Roberts and Robert Hogan.
14	"Kazinski Versus Bennett"	Unknown	Ed Jurist	January 31, 1979
Kaz's investigation into a hospital supplies racket may just end up jeopardizing Bennett's run for attorney general. Also stars Paul Sorensen, Steve Franken, James Hampton, Tim O'Connor and David Spielberg.
15	"The Stalking Man"	Unknown	David Jacobs	February 7, 1979
Unknown, with 3 guest stars: Marilyn Chris, Stephen Powers and Art Metrano.
16	"Trouble on the South Side" "It's Libel to Be Trouble"	Mel Damski	Albert Aley & David Malina	February 21, 1979
A priest enlists the aid of Kaz to stand against a ruthless councilman concerning public funding that is badly needed. Also stars Bruce French, Peter Horton, James Sloyan and John Randolph.
17	"Count Your Fingers"	Unknown	Preston Wood & William Wood	February 28, 1979
Kaz goes up against an underhanded attorney in an effort to clear Malloy's nephew of the charge of armed robbery. Also stars Ivan Bonar, David Huddleston, Gregory Rozakis, Estelle Omens and Craig Wasson.
18	"A Piece of Cake"	Unknown	Unknown	March 7, 1979
A prostitute gets Kaz to help her convince a jury that she only stabbed her former pimp in self-defense. Also stars Joanna Cassidy, Ric Mancini, Chuck Bergansky, Marc Alaimo and John P. Ryan.
19	"They've Taken Our Daughter"	Unknown	David Malina	March 21, 1979
After the parents of a girl who has joined a religious cult try to capture her and have her deprogrammed, cult leaders force the girl to bring kidnapping charges against them. Also stars Granville Van Dusen, Nina Wilcox, John Crawford, Larry Margo, Ralph Meeker, Alley Mills and Doug Sheehan.
20	"A Fool for a Client"	Unknown	Robert Dellinger	April 4, 1979
A convict's only hope of appeal is if Kaz can prove that her attorney was incompetent. Also stars Linda Dangcil, Linda Lavin, Robert Loggia, Charles Bartlett and Cynthia David.
21	"The Battered Bride"	Unknown	Tom Sawyer	April 11, 1979
After dismissing her own case against her husband, a battered wife is pushed past endurance and kills him. Kaz agrees to defend her. Also stars John Karlen, Allan Miller and Joanna Miles.
22	"The Avenging Angel"	Unknown	Unknown	April 18, 1979
A woman who appears to be extremely shy is accused of committing a brutal assault and is soon seen to be suffering from multiple personality syndrome. Also stars Sandy Martin, Woody Eney, Mark Giardino, Eddie Quillan, Francis Xavier McCarthy and Laurie Heineman.
