= Lewis Perdue =

American writer (born 1949)

- Perdue in 2009
- Born: May 1, 1949 (age 77); Greenwood, Mississippi, U.S.
- Education: Cornell University
- Occupation: Author
- Spouse: Megan Perdue
- Children: 2

Lewis Perdue (born May 1, 1949) is the author of 20 published books including Daughter of God, and The Da Vinci Legacy. Perdue was sued by Random House in 2003 when he charged that Dan Brown's The Da Vinci Code plagiarized those two books. Random House won the lawsuit but lost their demand to have Perdue pay their legal fees.

== Life ==
Perdue was born in the Mississippi Delta in 1949. He was expelled from the University of Mississippi in 1967 for leading a civil rights march. He graduated from Corning Community College in 1970 with an associate degree; in 2009, he was presented with the college's Distinguished Alumni Award. He studied physics and biology at Cornell University, graduating with a bachelor's degree and honors in 1972. While at Cornell, he worked as a full-time reporter for The Ithaca Journal.

Perdue currently lives in Sonoma, California, with his wife, Megan. They have two children.

== Career ==
Perdue has worked as a journalist for several publications, including Washingtonian Magazine, Computer Currents, TheStreet, and Barron's. In 1976, Perdue helped investigative journalist Jack Anderson break the Koreagate case as a freelance reporter for the Washington Post. He wrote the first book on how to upgrade IBM PCs, Supercharging Your PC: A Do-It Yourself Guide to Expanding the PC (1987).

In 1985, Perdue was named a vice president and managing director in San Jose for Manning Selvage & Lee. He founded the publication Wine Business Monthly in 1991, and has written two nonfiction books on the topic of wine: The French Paradox and Beyond: Live Longer with Wine and the Mediterranean Lifestyle (1992) and The Wrath of Grapes: The Coming Wine Industry Shakeout And How To Take Advantage Of It (1999). In 2008, Perdue founded Wine Industry Insight, a digital wine publication. In March 2023, Perdue announced that he had sold Wine Industry Insight to technology entrepreneur and winemaker Kevin Merritt.

In 2000, Perdue co-founded PocketPass, a dual-use telephone and Internet payment system.

Perdue is chairman of the nonprofit Center for Research on Environmental Chemicals in Humans. The center is currently exploring a potential causal relationship between human serum levels of BPA and High-Sensitivity C-Reactive Protein (hsCRP) through double blind clinical studies.

Perdue founded Revolution Algorithms, which is attempting to improve wine rating, review, and recommendation systems, in 2018.

== Plagiarism case ==
On April 11, 2005, novelist Lewis Perdue sued Brown and his publisher Random House for plagiarizing his novels The Da Vinci Legacy (1983) and Daughter of God (1999), claiming "there are far too many parallels between my books and The Da Vinci Code for it to be an accident." The director of Britain's Forensic Linguistics Institute, John Olsson, analyzed both books, and declared the "evidence of infringement is overwhelming" and "This is the most blatant example of in-your-face plagiarism I've ever seen... There are literally hundreds of parallels." However, Perdue was not allowed to introduce Olsson's statement at the Appeals Court hearing.

On August 4, 2005, District Judge George B. Daniels granted a motion for summary judgment and dismissed the suit, ruling that "a reasonable average lay observer would not conclude that The Da Vinci Code is substantially similar to Daughter of God. Any slightly similar elements are on the level of generalized or otherwise unprotectable ideas." He affirmed that The Da Vinci Code does not infringe upon copyrights held by Perdue.

== Works ==
=== Fiction ===
- The Trinity Implosion (co-written with Robin Moore) (1976)
- The Delphi Betrayal (1981; reissued 2022 by Brash Books)
- Queen's Gate Reckoning (1982; reissued 2022 by Brash Books)
- The Da Vinci Legacy (1983; reissued 2022 by Brash Books)
- The Tesla Bequest (1984; reissued 2022 by Brash Books)
- The Linz Testament (1985)
- Zaibatsu (1988)
- Daughter of God (1999)
- Slatewiper (2003)
- Perfect Killer (2005)
- Die By Wire (2011)

==== As Ian Ludlow, co-author with Lee Goldberg ====
- .357: Vigilante (1985; republished as Judgment in 2011)
- Make Them Pay (1985; republished as Adjourned in 2009)
- White Wash (1985; republished as Payback in 2011)

=== Nonfiction ===
- The Washington Connection (co-written with Robin Moore and Nick Rowe) (1977)
- Country Inns of Maryland, Virginia, and West Virginia (1977)
- Supercharging Your PC (1987)
- The High-Technology Editorial Guide and Stylebook (1991)
- The French Paradox and Beyond (1992)
- Erotica Biz: How Sex Shaped the Internet (2002)
- The Wrath of Grapes (2011)
