= Joel Goldman =

American writer (born 1952)

Joel K. Goldman
- Born: Joel K. Goldman; October 23, 1952 (age 73); Kansas City, Missouri, United States
- Education: University of Kansas; University of Kansas School of Law
- Occupation: Writer
- Writing career
- Genre: Crime fiction
- Website: joelgoldman.com

Joel K. Goldman (born October 23, 1952) is an American author and former trial attorney. He attended Shawnee Mission East High School, where he participated in the school's debate team. He attended the University of Kansas, participating in the debate team as well as Moot Court. He suffers from a tic disorder, which he incorporated into one of his works, the Jack Davis series. In September 2014, Goldman launched the publishing company Brash Books with novelist Lee Goldberg. The company publishes award-winning, highly acclaimed crime novels that have fallen out of print by authors like Bill Crider, Mark Smith, Carolyn Weston, Tom Kakonis, Maxine O'Callaghan, Gar Anthony Haywood, Jack Lynch, among others.

== Awards ==
- Thorpe Menn Award for Literary Excellence (2005)

== Bibliography ==
=== Novels ===
Ireland and Carter Thrillers

1. All In - with Lisa Klink (2017)
2. All Gone - with Lisa Klink (2018)

==== Lou Mason Thrillers ====
1. Motion to Kill (2002)
2. The Last Witness (2003)
3. Cold Truth (2004)
4. Deadlocked (2005)
5. Final Judgment (2012)

==== Jack Davis Thrillers ====
1. Shake Down (2008)
2. The Dead Man (2009)
3. No Way Out (2010)

==== Alex Stone Thrillers ====
1. Stone Cold (2012)
2. Chasing the Dead (2013)

=== Short stories ===
- Fire in the Sky (2011)
- Knife Fight (2009)

=== Other books ===
- Three to Get Deadly (3 novels by Joel Goldman, Lee Goldberg, Paul Levine)
- The Dead Man, vol 4 (Freaks Must Die) – with Lee Goldberg & William Rabkin (2012) (print)
- The Dead Man, vol 10 (Freaks Must Die) – with Lee Goldberg & William Rabkin (2012) (ebooks)

=== Anthologies ===
- Top Suspense – 12 Master Storytellers
- The Prosecution Rests
- Die Lover Die (2011)
- Favorite Kills

=== Non-fiction ===
- Writing Crime Fiction – Advice from authors of Top Suspense group (2012)
