= Confidence tricks in literature =

Fictional portrayals of confidence tricks

This is a list of notable literary works involving confidence tricks.

== Nineteenth century and earlier ==
- The Book of Swindles (Du pian xin shu, 1617) – story collection by Zhang Yingyu; China's first collection of stories about fraud, featuring twenty-four categories of swindle, circa late Ming dynasty
- The Government Inspector (1836) – play by Nikolai Gogol; the main character deceives the corrupt officials of a small town into believing that he is a government inspector
- Dead Souls (1836) – novel by Nikolai Gogol; the main character poses as a wealthy landowner so that he can acquire the souls of dead serfs
- The Confidence-Man (1857) – novel by Herman Melville; the main character tests confidence of other people
- Les Misérables (1862) – novel by Victor Hugo; the Thénardiers, two of the primary villains, scam money from people
- Adventures of Huckleberry Finn (1884) – novel by Mark Twain; two characters, The Duke and the Dauphin are grifters
- "The Red-Headed League" (1891) – Sherlock Holmes story by Arthur Conan Doyle, which involves a sort of confidence trick used to enable a bank robbery

== Twentieth century ==
- The Miracle Man (1914), play by George M. Cohan; the main characters are con artists.
- Simon Templar (published 1928–1963), also known as "The Saint", a main character in Leslie Charteris' novels and stories who is often involved in scams and cons
- The Twelve Chairs (1928) and The Little Golden Calf (1931) – satirical novels by Ilf and Petrov; the main character, Ostap Bender, is a con man, who has carried out most of the tricks listed below, and The Little Golden Calf contains a fictional secret society of con men called Children of Lieutenant Schmidt
- Farewell, My Lovely (1940) – novel by Raymond Chandler, the villains Marriott and Amthor are con-artists.
- The Space Merchants (1952) – sci-fi novel by Frederik Pohl and Cyril Kornbluth is full of con games practiced by corporations
- Confessions of Felix Krull, Confidence Man: The Early Years (1954) – Thomas Mann's unfinished novel about a German con man
- The Stainless Steel Rat (1961–present) – series of sci-fi novels by Harry Harrison; the protagonist, James Bolivar diGriz ("Slippery Jim"), is a con man and uses abundant schemes and frauds
- Travis McGee (published 1964–1984) – a character in John D. MacDonald's series of detective novels, frequently uses con games or has them tried against him
- Only When I Larf (1968) – comic thriller by Len Deighton describing the activities of a team of three fictional confidence tricksters.
- The Vanishing (1984) – psychological thriller novel by Tim Krabbé features a chemistry teacher who employs con for the purpose of kidnapping
- Repairman Jack (1984–present) – a character in F. Paul Wilson's series of novels, often runs scams on other con artists
- If Tomorrow Comes (1985) – novel by Sidney Sheldon, which has a con artist as the main character and is mostly based on trickery and deception
- Hellblazer (1988–present) – ongoing horror comic book series; the main character, John Constantine, uses confidence scams, trickery and magick
- The Brethren (2000) – novel by John Grisham features a con run by three incarcerated judges

== Twenty-first century ==
- Matchstick Men (2002) – novel by Eric Garcia; the main characters are con artists
- American Gods (2001) – novel by Neil Gaiman uses a two-man con as a major plot element
- Going Postal (2004) – Terry Pratchett's Discworld novel features a convicted and condemned con artist Moist von Lipwig, who applies the principles of the con in his new job as Postmaster General
- The Lies of Locke Lamora (2006) – fantasy novel by Scott Lynch follows the adventures of a group of con artists known as the Gentlemen Bastards
- The Collectors (2006) – novel by David Baldacci; one of the main characters cons a casino owner out of $40 million
- Mr. Monk in Trouble – mystery novel by Lee Goldberg based on the television series Monk features several subplots set in the 1850s where criminals salt their mines with rather ingenious methods
- Six of Crows (2015) – a fantasy novel by Leigh Bardugo; one of the main seeks revenge on the man who once conned him and his brother

== See also ==
- Picaresque novel
