= Mr. Monk on the Couch =

2011 novel by Lee Goldberg

- 1st edition 2011 hard cover
- Author: Lee Goldberg
- Language: English
- Series: Monk mystery novel series
- Genre: Mystery novel
- Publisher: Signet Books
- Publication date: June 7, 2011
- Publication place: United States
- Media type: Print (hardcover)
- Preceded by: Mr. Monk on the Road
- Followed by: Mr. Monk on Patrol

Mr. Monk on the Couch is the twelfth novel written by Lee Goldberg to be based on the television series Monk. It was published on June 7, 2011. Like the other Monk novels, the story is narrated by Natalie Teeger, Monk's assistant.

== Plot summary ==
Adrian Monk has to solve the murders of three people: a struggling student, a security guard, and a beautiful woman. The only common element between these three people is a couch. Meanwhile, Natalie Teeger solves a case on her own with the help of Monk's agoraphobic brother Ambrose.

== Mr. Monk and the Sunday Paper ==
Mr. Monk and the Sunday Paper is an excerpt from Mr. Monk on the Couch that was published as a short story in the July 2011 issue of Ellery Queen's Mystery Magazine after the release of the book.

== List of characters ==
=== Characters from the television series ===
- Adrian Monk: the titular detective, played on the series by Tony Shalhoub
- Natalie Teeger: Monk's loyal assistant and the narrator of the book, played on the series by Traylor Howard
- Ambrose Monk: Monk's agoraphobic brother, played on the series by John Turturro
- Leland Stottlemeyer: Head of the SFPD; Monk's and Natalie's boss and friend, played on the series by Ted Levine

=== Original characters ===
- Amy Devlin: A lieutenant who is Stottlemeyer's new right hand, replacing Randy Disher who is now the police chief of Summit, New Jersey
- Yuki Nakamara: Assistant to Dub Clemens until his death, now is the assistant and girlfriend of Ambrose Monk
