= Ralph Dennis =

American author of crime fiction

Ralph Dennis (December 30, 1931 – July 4, 1988) was an American author of crime fiction, best known for his Hardman series of detective novels. The writer and anthologist Ed Gorman described him as "the most beloved obscure private eye writer who ever lived".

== Personal life ==
Dennis was born in Sumter, South Carolina. He had two siblings—an older sister, Irma, and a younger brother, William. They were sent to an orphanage when their father died in 1941. After a few years, they left the orphanage and Irma supported her brothers by working as a waitress while they went to school.

Dennis graduated from the University of North Carolina in 1960 and received his master's degree from the same school in 1963. He later became an instructor at the university in its Department of Radio, Television, and Motion Pictures. Dennis also graduated from the Yale School of Drama and served in the United States Navy.

In the early 1970s, Dennis moved to Atlanta, where the Hardman novels were set.

== Career ==
His first book, Atlanta Deathwatch, was published as a paperback original in April 1974, and was quickly followed by six other Hardman books that same year. He published five additional Hardman novels in 1976–77. The series featured an unlicensed private investigator named Jim Hardman, a white ex-cop who works with a black partner, Hump Evans, a former pro football player. The books have been described as hardboiled fiction.

The first seven Hardman novels featured cover art by Scottish artist Ken Barr, who drew comics for DC and Marvel.

In the 1970s, singer/songwriter David Olney wrote & performed the song The Charleston Knife based on Ralph's book. The song was eventually recorded in 1992 and released in 1999 on Olney's live album Ghosts in the Wind. Singer Rocky Hill covered the song on his 1977 album Lone Star Legend, which wasn't released until 2012, three years after Hill's death.

In 1975, Dennis was hired to write the novel Atlanta (not to be confused with Atlanta Deathwatch) for a series of books that included Saturday Night in San Francisco, Saturday Night in Los Angeles by Owen Eliott, and Saturday Night in Milwaukee by Gary Brandner. But when the series was cancelled, Dennis' book was released on its own.

In 1976, Dennis wrote Deadman's Game, intended to be the first in a new series. The book was unsuccessful and a sequel he wrote was unpublished in his lifetime. He then returned to his Hardman series for six more books (seven if you count the unpublished 13th novel, which was discovered in 2019).

The final book to be published during his lifetime, 1979's MacTaggart’s War, was his only hardcover sale; Kirkus Reviews called it a "sweeping adventure spectacle… Dennis is a spiffy storyteller".

In 1982, hoping to revive the Hardman series, Pinnacle, an imprint of Kensington Books, republished The Charleston Knife is Back In Town, but the reprint sold poorly and Pinnacle declined to reissue other installments in the series.

Translations of three Hardman novels were published in France as part of the Super Noire series of crime fiction, and French literary critic Claude Mesplède hailed them as "classic hard-boiled novels" in his Dictionnaire des littératures policières.

== Death ==
Dennis was working as a bookstore clerk in Atlanta when he died of kidney failure at the age of 56 on July 4, 1988.

== Influence and legacy ==
Writers such as Joe R. Lansdale, Shane Black and Bill Crider have cited Dennis as an influence on their work. Lansdale has written that his characters of Hap and Leonard were partially inspired by Hardman and his partner Hump.

In 2018, Brash Books co-founder Lee Goldberg acquired the rights to all of Dennis' books, including several unpublished manuscripts. Brash Books subsequently reissued all twelve of the Hardman novels, with new introductions by Joe R. Lansdale, Paul Bishop, Mel Odom, Robert J. Randisi and former Georgia U.S. Representative Ben Jones among others. Brash also published new, revised editions of Dennis' standalone novels Atlanta (now titled The Broken Fixer) and MacTaggart's War (now titled The War Heist).

In a review of the reissued Atlanta Deathwatch, Publishers Weekly wrote, "Dennis pulls no punches in this lightning-paced crime story packed with irreverence and loads of action", while Mystery Scene called it "lean and mean, with punchy descriptions and sharp-edged dialogue", and described Dennis as "a crime writer whose work has been criminally undervalued".

In late 2019, Brash published A Talent For Killing, a new thriller that combined Dennis' previously published novel Deadman's Game with his unpublished sequel. Publishers Weekly wrote "Dennis doesn’t mince words. Every line is razor sharp and without an ounce of fat. Jason Bourne fans will find a lot to like." The magazine also praised The Spy in a Box, one of his previously unpublished manuscripts, as "a disciplined focus on atmosphere...Dennis’s stark, impassive prose will appeal to noir fans".

Dust in the Heart, the final manuscript written by Ralph before his death, was released by Brash Books in January 2020. Publishers Weekly praised the book, writing: "In lesser hands, this kind of hard-boiled style would fall into cliché or stereotype, but Dennis, with a sharp ear for dialogue, skilled plotting, and the ability to create fully developed characters, keeps the story fresh and the action believable. Any fan of Ross Macdonald or Ed McBain will thoroughly enjoy this."

For decades, it was believed that there were only 12 books in the Hardman series, which ended with The Buy Back Blues. But a long-lost, unpublished Hardman novel, All Kinds of Ugly, was discovered by Lee Goldberg in late 2019 and was released by Brash Books in February 2020. The book was written during the course of Dennis' research for MacTaggart's War and was originally entitled Hardman in London. Publishers Weekly said in its review that All Kinds of Ugly demonstrated that Dennis' "strong prose and well-paced storytelling place him alongside the likes of George V. Higgins and Ross Macdonald.". In June 2021, the book was chosen as a finalist for the 2020 Shamus Award for Best Paperback Novel by the Private Eye Writers of America.

== Bibliography ==
=== Hardman ===
- Atlanta Deathwatch (1974; reissued 2018)
- The Charleston Knife is Back in Town (1974; reissued 2018)
- The Golden Girl & All (1974; reissued 2018)
- Pimp For The Dead (1974; reissued 2018)
- Down Among the Jocks (1974; reissued 2019)
- Murder Is Not an Odd Job (1974; reissued 2019)
- Working for the Man (1974; reissued 2019)
- The Deadly Cotton Heart (1976; reissued 2019)
- The One-dollar Rip-off (1977; reissue 2019)
- Hump's First Case (1977; reissued 2019)
- The Last of the Armageddon Wars (1977; reissued 2019)
- The Buy Back Blues (1977; reissued 2019)
- All Kinds of Ugly (2020, previously unpublished)

=== Other novels ===
- Atlanta (1975; revised version published in 2019 as The Broken Fixer)
- Deadman's Game (1976; revised version, combined with an unpublished sequel, published in 2019 as A Talent for Killing)
- MacTaggart’s War (1979; revised version published in 2019 as The War Heist)
- The Spy in a Box (December 2019, previously unpublished)
- Tales of a Sad, Fat Wordman (December 2019, a collection of Ralph's short stories and essays about him by his friends and admirers)
- Dust in the Heart (January 2020, previously unpublished)
- The New Five (November 2020, previously unpublished)
- Wind Sprints (September 2023, previously unpublished)
