= Mr. Monk on the Road =

2011 novel by Lee Goldberg

- 1st edition 2011 hard cover
- Author: Lee Goldberg
- Language: English
- Series: Monk mystery novel series
- Genre: Mystery novel
- Published: January 4, 2011 Signet Books
- Publication place: United States
- Media type: Print (hardcover)
- Preceded by: Mr. Monk is Cleaned Out
- Followed by: Mr. Monk on the Couch

Mr. Monk on the Road is the eleventh novel written by Lee Goldberg to be based on the television series Monk. It was published on January 4, 2011. Like the other Monk novels, the story is narrated by Natalie Teeger, Monk's assistant.

== Plot summary ==
Feeling balanced after solving the murder of his wife Trudy, Adrian Monk and his assistant, Natalie Teeger, are called by Captain Stottlemeyer to the home of Nelson Derrick, an author who has apparently just committed suicide out of guilt over constantly ripping off his best novel. The meeting is so Monk can meet Lieutenant Randy Disher’s replacement, Amy Devlin, a former undercover vice officer. Upon investigating the scene, however, Monk reveals that Derrick’s agent, David Hale, killed him and staged the scene, using a fishing line to lock the chain on the front door after he left.

The next day, Monk and Natalie go to visit Monk’s agoraphobic brother, Ambrose, for breakfast, and discuss Ambrose’s upcoming birthday. On the way home, Monk and Natalie are detoured to the home of a recovering cancer patient, who died of salmonella after eating a tainted box of her (and Ambrose’s) favorite cereal. However, Monk, having learned much about the cereal from his brother, realizes the box was purchased after the recall and thus was clean, and soon proves the woman’s brother emptied the box and refilled it with contaminated cereal to murder his sister and sell her house to pay off his debts. After solving the case, Monk finally decides on his brother’s birthday present; a road trip in a motor home.

With the help of Natalie, Julie, and Molly, Ambrose's birthday cake is drugged with sleeping pills and Ambrose is dragged into the motor home. When Ambrose wakes up, he finds himself on the open road with Adrian determined to show him the outside world. However, Ambrose is angry at being duped.

The first stop is the Mystery Spot, which goes badly as Monk reveals the trick behind the Spot and ruins it for everyone else. He and Natalie try to flee, but find Ambrose called the police on them. However, when the officers recognize Monk, they summon him to a crime scene in Santa Cruz, where a young woman appears to have accidentally drowned. Monk soon discovers it was murder, but Natalie refuses to let him investigate and ruin the trip for Ambrose. Upon stopping for the night, they meet several eclectic people, including a reporter named Dub Clemens who is determined to find a killer before he dies of lung cancer, and his tattooed assistant Yuki.

== Mr. Monk and the Seventeen Steps ==
Mr. Monk and the Seventeen Steps is an excerpt from Mr. Monk on the Road that was published in the December 2010 issue of Ellery Queen's Mystery Magazine before the release of the book. In the story, Monk is called upon to investigate an apparent suicide, and is disturbed by the fact that the walkway to the deceased's home has an odd number of steps.

== List of characters ==
=== Characters from the television series ===
- Adrian Monk: the titular detective, played on the series by Tony Shalhoub
- Natalie Teeger: Monk's loyal assistant and the narrator of the book, played on the series by Traylor Howard
- Julie Teeger: Natalie's daughter, played on the series by Emmy Clarke
- Ambrose Monk: Monk's agoraphobic brother, played on the series by John Turturro
- Leland Stottlemeyer: Head of the SFPD; Monk's and Natalie's boss and friend, played on the series by Ted Levine
- Molly Evans: Trudy's biological daughter and Monk's step-daughter, played on the series by Alona Tal

=== Original characters ===
- Dub Clemens: An aging reporter who is dying of lung cancer, and is searching for the identity of a killer he has been tracking for years.
- Yuki Nakamura: Dub's assistant, who travels with him in his RV.
