= Mr. Monk Is Cleaned Out =

2010 novel by Lee Goldberg

Mr. Monk is Cleaned Out
- 1st edition 2010 hard cover
- Author: Lee Goldberg
- Language: English
- Series: Monk mystery novel series
- Genre: Mystery novel
- Publisher: Signet Books
- Publication date: July 6, 2010
- Publication place: United States
- Media type: Print (hardcover)
- Preceded by: Mr. Monk in Trouble
- Followed by: Mr. Monk on the Road

Mr. Monk is Cleaned Out is the tenth novel written by Lee Goldberg to be based on the television series Monk. It was published on July 6, 2010. Like the other novels, the story is narrated by Natalie Teeger, Monk's assistant.

== Plot summary ==
During a financial crisis, Adrian Monk's favorite brand of bottled water goes out of business, and he goes into severe withdrawal. As he and his assistant, Natalie Teeger, leave the store, they run into Captain Leland Stottlemeyer and Randy Disher, who are both flustered over the murder of Mike Clasker, CFO of Big County Mortgage, a financial company involved in a Ponzi scheme, and whom Clasker was set to testify against, but while Stottlemeyer and Disher were escorting him to court, Clasker was strangled with a length of piano wire inside his locked car when he stopped at a red light. No one was seen in or even remotely near the car when the murder occurred. Stottlemeyer asks Monk for help, but the bad news about his water has upset Monk too much to concentrate. To make matters worse, the San Francisco police department is also forced to fire Monk as a consultant. However, just minutes after his firing, Monk solves Clasker's murder, exposing the medical examiner as the killer. The ME, one of the many people who'd lost several things that Clasker got to keep, hid in the trunk of Clasker's car in the wee hours of the morning, then when the car stopped at the red light, the ME pushed down the back seat, crawled through the opening, strangled Clasker, hid again, then came back out of hiding while no one was looking so that when someone eventually did see him in the car, they thought he'd entered through the door. Stottlemeyer praises Monk for solving the case but says although rehiring him is what he wants most of all, he can't do it.

Monk is unable to find a substitute for his bottled water, so he and Natalie go to the bank to make a withdrawal, only to find that Monk's account is empty. Natalie learns that Monk invested his life savings with Bob Sebes, Big County Mortgage's CEO, who has just been arrested on charges of running the alleged ponzi scheme that has ruined millions of lives. Monk and Natalie are forced to find new jobs, and are surprised when they are quickly hired at the convenience store where Monk first heard about his water being discontinued. However, their first day gets off to a bad start when Monk overcharges customers by rounding up when the prices are uneven and has a disagreement with an elderly woman who complains about being charged more than necessary. Then, while Monk is ringing up purchases for a married couple, the woman complaining she has been feeling sick, he hits the silent alarm and when the police arrive, he proves the woman's husband has been poisoning her for her life insurance. However, several customers report Monk for overcharging them, and it is revealed the woman Monk argued with was the store manager's mother! Monk is fired on the spot when the woman calls her son to complain, and Natalie quits in protest.

Shortly after, Russell Haxby, the key witness in the Sebes case is murdered, leaving Monk to consider Sebes the prime suspect, except Sebes, who is under house arrest with constant guard and continuous media scrutiny had absolutely no way to commit the murder. They confront Sebes anyway, but he and his wife Anna only to confirm the obvious fact that if Sebes had killed Haxby, his ankle bracelet that keeps him on his property would have alerted authorities the moment he left; however, the bracelet's readings indicate that Sebes was home all night. Monk figures there are two ways that Sebes can be guilty: he either managed to find some way to mess with his ankle bracelet, or his wife committed the murder. Stottlemeyer shoots down both of these theories; Sebes's ankle bracelet is tamperproof, and his wife has arthritis.

Monk and Natalie then manage to get jobs as chefs at a pizzeria, but Monk refuses to mix toppings together unevenly and is made a host instead, where he causes more trouble by refusing to seat people who don't meet his standards and also upsets a family by proving the mother is having an affair. But the last straw comes when Monk terrifies all the customers by announcing that eating with their hands will kill them. The owner angrily fires Monk because he has lost all his business for that night due to having to give all the customers their dinner free of charge to calm them down. Monk naturally denies doing anything wrong and threatens to report the restaurant to the Health Department if he does not get his job back. The owner refuses and bans Monk from the pizzeria, while Natalie quits as well, informing Monk not to follow through with his threat, as if the Health Department is sent to the restaurant, the owner will just tell them about the confrontation, and Monk will end up facing federal charges because the Health Department will think he only called them as a vicious prank and that he knew the pizzeria did not violate any health codes. Natalie also tells Monk to stop trying to make people follow his own beliefs, and warns him that if he gets himself fired one more time, she'll stay there and refuse to work with him. Monk agrees, and he and Natalie go their separate ways.

Unfortunately, an hour later, Monk shows up on Natalie's doorstep to tell her he's been evicted from his apartment due to not paying his rent. Natalie listens to Monk's sob story and believes his eviction was unjustified, but Monk refused to contest it because his landlord is missing a tooth and makes Monk uncomfortable whenever he talks, resulting in Monk banning his landlord from ever communicating verbally with him in any way. He asks to stay with Natalie but ends up bunking with Stottlemeyer instead, making for a sleepless night for both of them. Stottlemeyer complains to Natalie the next morning over coffee, and Natalie tries to persuade Monk's landlord to take him back, to no avail. However, she does find proof he is guilty of several minor criminal offenses and takes it with her as insurance. That night, Natalie breaks into Monk's apartment and steals back some of his things for him.

However, Natalie soon gets a call from Stottlemeyer that another witness in the Sebes case, Lincoln Clovis, has also been murdered. At the crime scene, Monk again claims that Sebes is the killer, but Stottlemeyer does not listen and shows Monk the readings from Sebes's bracelet to prove that Sebes is innocent; however, Monk discovers Sebes had a drink of whisky during the night, despite Monk recalling that Sebes is deathly allergic to alcohol. Monk deduces Anna Sebes put on the bracelet to keep it on the property while her husband snuck out to kill Clovis, but Stottlemeyer argues that this is impossible, as the bracelet would have alerted the police the moment Sebes removed it. Stottlemeyer does question Sebes about the alcohol reading, but returns only to tell Monk there was a much more logical explanation - feeling guilty about all the lives he'd ruined, Sebes took the drink as a suicide attempt, but his wife came home just as he did so. She didn't call an ambulance because she was able to cure him almost immediately with an EpiPen.

Disher manages to get Monk and Natalie new jobs at the mall as salespeople for a women's clothing store. Although Monk has a small altercation with a drag queen, he manages to keep his job after the first day. To celebrate, he and Natalie have dinner at the mall cafeteria. As they are leaving, Monk deduces that the security staff is planning a robbery, and plans to warn Disher the next time he sees him.

That chance comes sooner than expected; on the way home, Monk and Natalie stumble across Stottlemeyer and Disher at another crime scene, where yet another witness in the Sebes case, Duncan Dern, has been found strangled to death in McKinley Park. Stottlemeyer refuses to let Monk investigate, knowing Monk will once again accuse Sebes. He does, and Stottlemeyer forces Monk to leave. Before he does so, Monk informs Disher about the robbery, and that night, the police raid the mall and catch the thieves red-handed.

The next morning, Monk calls Natalie in a panic, telling her he knows how Sebes committed the murders. The two stake out the Sebes house, and see Anna Sebes drive away. Monk and Natalie follow her to the car wash, and much to Natalie's shock, Monk jumps on the hood of Anna's car as she goes through, preventing the car from being washed. When the car comes out, Monk falls off, but Natalie, realizing Monk was trying to tell her the car has traces of evidence, drives straight into it head-on, blocking it in. Stottlemeyer arrives and has the Sebes' car towed, but refuses Monk's request to have forensics analyze it, while Anna demands Monk be arrested for assault.

The foursome and Disher return to the Sebes house, where an angry Bob Sebes threatens to sue Monk for the attack on his wife. Monk tells him it won't be necessary, claiming he now knows that Sebes is the murderer, and gives his summation.

Here's What Happened

Sebes knew his Ponzi scheme was on the brink of being exposed and he would surely be facing federal charges. He also knew that several of his employees would be charged as accomplices and most likely would testify against him to save their own necks. So Sebes came up with a plan: before the preliminary hearing, he bought the exact ankle bracelet he would wear if placed under house arrest, the exact condition he had his lawyer fight for while awaiting trial. The judge easily agreed, thinking it would be impossible for Sebes to escape, but didn't know just how clever Sebes was. Monk explains he was sure he was on the right track with his third theory about the Sebes couple taking turns wearing the bracelet, but also knew that Stottlemeyer was right and that Sebes couldn't have removed his bracelet without the police knowing. However, Monk reveals the real trick; after the court had Sebes fitted with a second bracelet, Anna put on the first one and put it on the exact same frequency before activating it. As a result, the readings on both bracelets were exactly the same. Sebes then removed his bracelet, and then only Anna's readings were being transmitted, so the police were none the wiser. Anna made sure to wait until Bob returned and reattached his bracelet before taking hers off, so as a result, the readings never changed. However, they didn't know that the bracelet monitored alcohol consumption, so when Anna had a drink while Bob was out killing Lincoln Clovis, the plan almost fell apart, but as a stroke of luck, they managed to fool Stottlemeyer with the suicide story.

Stottlemeyer is now mostly convinced, but still points out one last flaw in Monk's reasoning; there was press all around the Sebes house that would have literally trapped Bob inside even without the bracelet, and although the murders happened at night, when there was no press, Bob could have been spotted leaving by a neighbor or passerby. Monk responds by showing two newspaper photos, both of Anna Sebes leaving the house. He points out that, by comparing her to the windows, Anna is taller in the second photo, taken the previous day, than in the first photo, taken the morning after Haxby's murder. Monk explains the woman in the second photo is actually Bob in disguise when he snuck out to kill Duncan Dern, and that Bob's athlete's foot - a recurring nuisance for Monk throughout the novel - was caused by wearing a larger pair of the same high heels Anna owns. Stottlemeyer then tells Monk his reasoning is still not entirely convincing but happily adds it will be enough for a search warrant, which will surely locate both the other bracelet and the larger pair of shoes, and Disher arrests the Sebeses.

As Stottlemeyer and Disher lead the couple away, Monk and Natalie stay behind, with the latter telling the former that she has made a surprise arrangement for him that she is sure he will like. Stottlemeyer returns and happily tells Monk that Sebes has already confessed to killing Haxby, Clovis, and Dern, and will return all the money he stole through his Ponzi scheme in exchange for avoiding the death penalty and his wife getting leniency. He and Natalie then reveal the good news; upon hearing of Monk's brilliant deduction, the deputy commissioner has not only reinstated his consulting job but has also accepted a three-year pay-or-play contract that Natalie established due to Monk's value to the SFPD, leaving him no chance of ever getting fired again. Stottlemeyer also tells Monk about the evidence Natalie found about his landlord's "dirty laundry," which she passed on to Stottlemeyer and he passed on to the DA, who has successfully forced Monk's landlord to revoke his eviction in exchange for avoiding prosecution. Monk is so happy when he realizes his job is now secure that he thanks Natalie for being his best assistant ever, when she presents him with one last surprise; a bottle of Fiji bottled water, along with a note from Monk's brother Ambrose, telling him how Fiji water is just as clean and sanitary as Monk's old brand. Monk takes a swig and announces that it feels like he's still drinking his old water, declaring Fiji water his new favorite brand.

== List of characters ==
=== Characters from the television series ===
- Adrian Monk: the titular detective, played on the series by Tony Shalhoub
- Natalie Teeger: Monk's loyal assistant and the narrator of the book, played on the series by Traylor Howard

=== Original characters ===
- Bob Sebes: Managed Reinier Investments, and has been arrested on charges of orchestrating a $100 million fraud.
