= John Sanford (writer) =

American screenwriter and prose writer

Julian Shapiro
- Born: Julian Lawrence Shapiro; May 31, 1904; Harlem
- Died: March 6, 2003 (aged 98); Montecito, California
- Spouse: Marguerite Roberts
- Writing career
- Pen name: John Sanford, John B. Sanford
- Notable works: The Old Man's Place, The People From Heaven
- Website: psych.fullerton.edu/jmearns/sanford.htm

John Sanford or John B. Sanford, born Julian Lawrence Shapiro (May 31, 1904 – March 6, 2003), was an American screenwriter and prose writer who wrote 24 books. The Cambridge Companion to Jewish American Literature describes him as, "Perhaps the most outstanding neglected novelist." A one-time member of the Communist Party, after he and his wife Marguerite Roberts refused to testify to the House Un-American Activities Committee, they were blacklisted and unable to work in Hollywood for nearly a decade.

Sanford wrote half of his books after he was 80. He published a 5-volume autobiography, for which he received a PEN/Faulkner Award and the Los Angeles Times Lifetime Achievement Award. He left three unpublished novels and was writing up until a month before his death at 98.

== Early life ==
Julian Shapiro was born in Harlem, New York to a first-generation American mother and Russian immigrant father, who was a lawyer. Both were Jewish. His mother died in 1914 when he was only 10, which marked his life. He attended local public schools as a boy.

After graduating from Lafayette College in Pennsylvania, Shapiro studied law at Fordham University, obtaining his degree in 1929. A childhood friend of Nathanael West, Shapiro decided to focus on writing when West said he was writing a book.

== Career ==
Shapiro then wrote for avant-garde magazines (The New Review, Tambour, Pagany, Contact) and gave up working as a lawyer. In the summer of 1931, isolated in a log cabin in the Adirondacks, he finished his first novel, The Water Wheel.

When he was close to publishing his second book, The Old Man's Place, his friend West (born Weinstein), suggested he change his name to one less identifiably Jewish. Shapiro used the name of a character from his first book and published his second under the pseudonym of John B. Sanford (which he adopted as his legal name in 1940). They both thought that antisemitism could hurt their book sales.

In 1935, the success of The Old Man's Place allowed Sanford to consider a screenwriter's career, and he moved to Hollywood.

In 1936, Sanford was hired by Paramount Pictures, where he met his future wife Marguerite Roberts, a screenwriter. The same year, he became involved in the Communist Party of the United States and would never renounce his political convictions. In 1939 Roberts signed the first of many contracts with Metro-Goldwyn-Mayer; she was one of the most respected and best-paid screenwriters of Hollywood. She was the moneymaker of the couple. Together, they wrote the scenario of Honky Tonk (1941). When Sanford was later offered a contract with Metro-Goldwyn-Mayer, Roberts encouraged him to devote his effort to his personal writing, which he did.

== Blacklisting ==
While Sanford continued as a member of the Communist Party, Roberts was not as strongly committed. She became a member after meeting him, but turned back her card in 1947. Their associations resulted in their being called to testify before the House Un-American Activities Committee. They both refused to give names, invoking the fifth amendment. This effectively ended their Hollywood careers. Roberts was blacklisted from 1951 to 1962. In 1957 they moved to Montecito, California, near Santa Barbara.

== Literary works ==
The People From Heaven (1943) is considered Sanford's masterpiece. The novel tells of a small-town shop owner who rapes a young African-American woman, beats to death a Native American, and tries to get rid of the only Jew in the town. In turn, the shop owner is finally killed by the black woman. At the time, the poet Carl Sandburg lauded the book, and poet William Carlos Williams said it's "the most important book of fiction published here in the last 20 years."

Sanford later turned to the biographical and autobiographical genre. He published half of his works after he was 80. He created a gallery of small portraits that dramatized his stories, making them more accessible and colorful. The Color of the Air: Scenes From the Life of an American Jew (1985), the first volume of his five-volume autobiography, covered 1904–1927. Four other titles followed, which earned him the PEN/Faulkner Award and the Los Angeles Times Lifetime Achievement Award.

After Roberts died in 1989, Sanford devoted his writing to exploring their more than 50-year marriage. In spite of vision troubles, he was writing one month before his death at 98. According to Tim Rutten,

His books are a stunning fusion of formal experimentation and supple, lyric prose. There is nothing like them anywhere in American letters. Though he sometimes was compared to the young John Dos Passos, Sanford's work was so original that it confounded critics and their categories -- probably to his professional detriment.

Sanford left three unpublished books: A Dinner of Herbs, about the women he knew; A Citizen of No Mean City, about his father; and Little Sister Spoken For, about the first five years of his marriage with Marguerite Roberts. He also contributed to a book about Martin Berkeley, the informer who gave more than 150 names (including the Sanfords) to the inquiry committee in 1951. Jack Mearns was appointed literary executor. A psychology teacher at the California State University, Fullerton, he said that Sanford, in his story "Judas and Inquiry" for the book on Berkeley, explored the mind of a man who would inform on others.

In March 2020, Sanford's first novel, The Water Wheel, was reprinted under his real name (Julian L. Shapiro) by Tough Poets Press, with an introduction by Sanford's bibliographer, Jack Mearns. In 2021, his novels The Old Man’s Place (originally titled The Hard Guys) and Make My Bed In Hell, the first two books of his Warrensburg trilogy, were re-released with new introductions by Mearns, by Brash Books. The third book of the trilogy, The People from Heaven, was re-released in 2022 by Brash Books.

== Published works ==
As Julian L. Shapiro:

- The Water Wheel, The Dragon Press, 1933.
- Tambour, University of Wisconsin Press, 2002. (Facsimile edition of a 1930 French literary periodical that contained a contribution by Shapiro)

As John Sanford:

- The Old Man's Place (originally titled The Hard Guys), New York: Albert and Charles Boni, 1935.
- Seventy Times Seven, New York: Alfred A. Knopf, 1939.
- Make My Bed in Hell, 1939.
- The People from Heaven, New York: Harcourt, Brace and Company, 1943.
- A Man without Shoes, Los Angeles: Plantin Press, 1951.
- The Land That Touches Mine, Garden City: Doubleday & Company, 1953.
- Every Island Fled Away, New York: W.W. Norton, 1964.
- The $300 Man, Englewood Cliffs: Prentice-Hall, 1967.
- A More Goodly Country: A Personal History of America, New York, Horizon Press, 1975.
- Adirondack Stories, Santa Barbara, Capra Press, 1976.
- Intruders in Paradise, University of Illinois Press, 1997
- Adirondack Stories, Santa Barbara: Capra Press, 1976.
- View From This Wilderness: American Literature as History, Santa Barbara: Capra Press, 1977.
- To Feed Their Hopes. A Book of American Women, University of Illinois Press, 1980. ISBN 0-252-00804-9
- The Winters of That Country: Tales of the Man Made Seasons, Santa Barbara: Black Sparrow Press, 1984.
- The Color of the Air: Scenes from the Life of an American Jew, Volume 1, Santa Barbara: Black Sparrow Press, 1985.
- The Waters of Darkness: Scenes from the Life of an American Jew, Volume 2, Santa Barbara: Black Sparrow Press, 1986
- A Very Good Land to Fall With: Scenes from the Life of an American Jew, Volume 3, Santa Rosa: Black Sparrow Press, 1987.
- A Walk in the Fire: Scenes from the Life of an American Jew, Volume 4, Santa Rosa: Black Sparrow Press, 1989.
- The Season, It Was Winter: Scenes from the Life of an American Jew, Volume 5, Santa Rosa: Black Sparrow Press, 1991.
- Maggie: A Love Story, Fort Lee, N.J.: Barricade Books, 1993.
- The View from Mt. Morris: A Harlem Boyhood, New York: Barricade Books, 1994.
- We Have a Little Sister: Marguerite: The Midwest Years, Santa Barbara: Capra Press, 1995.
- A Palace of Silver: A Memoir of Maggie Roberts, Santa Barbara: Capra Press, 2003.
- (with Jonathan Lethem and Nathanael West) Miss Lonelyhearts and The Day of the Locust, New Directions Publishing, 2009.

== Biography ==
- Jack Mearns John Sanford. An annotated bibliography, New Castle, Oak Knoll Press, 2008. ISBN 978-1-58456-211-5
