= Missing (Canadian TV series) =

Canadian-American crime drama television series

- Also known as: 1-800-Missing
- Genre: Crime drama
- Created by: Glenn Davis; William Laurin
- Based on: 1-800-WHERE-R-YOU by Meg Cabot
- Starring: Gloria Reuben; Caterina Scorsone; Dean McDermott; Adam MacDonald; Alberta Watson; Justina Machado; Vivica A. Fox; Mark Consuelos; Justin Louis
- Theme music composer: Andy Chase; Michèle Vice-Maslin
- Opening theme: "This Dream Is Real", performed by Gloria Reuben (season 1) "Till I Find You" performed by Kina (seasons 2–3)
- Composers: Andrew Lockington; Lou Pomanti
- Country of origin: Canada
- Original language: English
- No. of seasons: 3
- No. of episodes: 55

Production
- Executive producers: Richard J. Anobile; Glenn Davis; Debra Martin Chase; Lee Goldberg; William Rabkin
- Producers: Paul Quarrington; Lisa Klink
- Production location: Toronto
- Camera setup: Single-camera
- Running time: 45 minutes
- Production companies: NDG Productions; Lions Gate Television; Missing Production Corp; Missing Productions II; CHUM Television

Original release
- Network: A-Channel; W Network (Canada); Lifetime (United States)
- Release: August 2, 2003 – February 5, 2006

Missing (originally titled 1-800-Missing) is a Canadian crime drama television series based on the 1-800-WHERE-R-YOU book series by Meg Cabot. The series aired on the A-Channel network and W Network in Canada, and on Lifetime in the United States from August 2003 to February 2006.

The theme song was "This Dream Is Real", performed by actress Gloria Reuben, was heard during the first season, while the second season, it was replaced with a song called "Till I Find You" performed by Kina, which was heard during the opening credits as well.

== Synopsis ==
The series is centred on Jess Mastriani, played by Caterina Scorsone, a woman in her twenties who receives psychic abilities after being hit by lightning. She is employed by a special FBI Task Force because she has visions which, once interpreted, contain clues that will help her find missing people. The series initially starred Gloria Reuben as Brooke Haslett, Jess's skeptical partner. Other stars of the series during its first season included Justina Machado as Sunny Estrada, and Dean McDermott as Alan Coyle. Alberta Watson appeared in the pilot as Jess' mother, however; the part was later recast and Watson did not appear on the show again.

In the second season, significant changes, including casting, were made. The show was completely retooled. Jess's partner was changed to Nicole Scott, portrayed by Vivica A. Fox. Taking Sunny's place was Mark Consuelos, and Justin Louis assumed the role of the Assistant Director John Pollock. Jess's psychic powers remained important, but more focus was given to the other characters.

The series finale aired on February 5, 2006 alongside the show's partner Strong Medicine and, in April 2006, it was revealed that Missing had been cancelled after a successful three-year, fifty-six-episode run. Lifetime said the show had "run its course."

== Cast ==
- Gloria Reuben as FBI Agent Brooke Haslett (season 1)
- Caterina Scorsone as FBI Agent Jess Mastriani
- Dean McDermott as FBI Special Agent in Charge Alan Coyle (season 1)
- Adam MacDonald as Douglas (main: season 1; guest: season 2)
- Alberta Watson/Maria Ricossa as Toni Mastriani (guest: seasons 1–2) (Note: Toni Mastriani was recast with actress Maria Ricossa beginning with "Insomnia". Ricossa last appeared in "We Are Coming Home".)
- Justina Machado as FBI Agent Sunny Estrada (season 1)
- Vivica A. Fox as FBI Agent Nicole Scott (seasons 2–3)
- Mark Consuelos as FBI Agent Antonio Cortez (seasons 2–3)
- Justin Louis as Assistant Director John Pollock (seasons 2–3)

== Episodes ==
=== Season 1 (2003–04) ===
No. overall	No. in season	Title	Directed by	Written by	Original release date
1	1	"Pilot"	Michael Fresco	Glenn Davis & William Laurin	August 2, 2003
2	2	"They Come as They Go"	David Wu	Glenn Davis & William Laurin	August 9, 2003
3	3	"Insomnia"	Kristoffer Tabori	Lee Goldberg & William Rabkin	August 16, 2003
4	4	"I Thought I Knew You"	David Wu	Philip Bedard & Larry Lalonde	August 23, 2003
5	5	"Thin Air"	Stephen Williams	Kiri Hart & Christopher Barbour	September 6, 2003
6	6	"Never Go Against the Family"	David Wu	Glenn Davis & William Laurin	September 13, 2003
7	7	"This Is Your Life"	James Head	Paul Quarrington	September 20, 2003
8	8	"Ties That Bind"	Mike Rohl	Katherine Boutry	September 27, 2003
9	9	"M.I.A."	Mel Damski	Laura J. Burns & Melinda Metz	October 11, 2003
10	10	"72 Hours to Kill"	Mike Rohl	Lee Goldberg & William Rabkin	October 18, 2003
11	11	"Deliverance from Evil"	David Wu	Glenn Davis & William Laurin	November 1, 2003
12	12	"Victoria"	Milan Cheylov	Philip Bedard & Larry Lalonde	November 8, 2003
13	13	"White Whale"	David Wu	Paul Quarrington, Story by Glenn Davis & William Laurin	November 22, 2003
14	14	"Basic Training"	David Wu	Lee Goldberg & William Rabkin	December 6, 2003
15	15	"Father Figure"	T.J. Scott	Philip Bedard & Larry Lalonde	December 13, 2003
16	16	"Lost Sister"	Neill Fearnley	Glenn Davis & William Laurin	January 3, 2004
17	17	"Delusional"	Mike Rohl	Lee Goldberg & William Rabkin	January 10, 2004
18	18	"These Dreams Before Me"	Neill Fearnley	Glenn Davis & William Laurin	January 24, 2004

=== Season 2 (2004–05) ===
No. overall	No. in season	Title	Directed by	Written by	Original release date
19	1	"Sea of Love"	David Wu	Glenn Davis & William Laurin	July 10, 2004
20	2	"One Night Stand"	Mike Rohl	Lisa Klink	July 17, 2004
21	3	"Judgment Day"	David Wu	Diane Ademu-John	July 24, 2004
22	4	"Resurrection"	Mike Rohl	Morgan Gendel	July 31, 2004
23	5	"Last Stop"	David Wu	Lee Goldberg & William Rabkin	August 7, 2004
24	6	"In the Midnight Hour"	David Wu	Lisa Klink	August 14, 2004
25	7	"Domestic Bliss"	Michael Robison	Lee Goldberg & William Rabkin	August 21, 2004
26	8	"Cop Out"	Farhad Mann	Morgan Gendel	September 18, 2004
27	9	"Puzzle Box"	Steven Goldmann	Lee Goldberg & William Rabkin	September 25, 2004
28	10	"Pop Star Story"	Mike Rohl	Diane Ademu-John	October 2, 2004
29	11	"Mr. Nobody"	Bill Duke	Lisa Klink	October 9, 2004
30	12	"Truth or Dare: Part 1"	Steven Goldmann	Glenn Davis & William Laurin	October 16, 2004
31	13	"Truth or Dare: Part 2"	Mike Rohl	Glenn Davis & William Laurin	October 23, 2004
32	14	"Deep Cover"	Neill Fearnley	Lisa Klink	October 30, 2004
33	15	"John Doe"	Mike Rohl	Lee Goldberg & William Rabkin	January 9, 2005
34	16	"Phoenix Rising"	David Wu	Diane Ademu-John	January 16, 2005
35	17	"Paper Anniversary"	Mike Rohl	Diane Ademu-John	January 23, 2005
36	18	"We Are Coming Home"	David Wu	Glenn Davis & William Lauren	January 30, 2005

=== Season 3 (2005–06) ===
No. overall	No. in season	Title	Directed by	Written by	Original release date
37	1	"Anything for the Baby: Part 1"	John Fawcett	Glenn Davis & William Laurin	June 12, 2005
38	2	"Anything for the Baby: Part 2"	John Fawcett	Glenn Davis & William Laurin	June 19, 2005
39	3	"Unnatural Disaster"	Steven Goldmann	Lisa Klink	June 26, 2005
40	4	"Off the Grid"	Neill Fearnley	Natalie Chaidez	July 10, 2005
41	5	"And the Walls Come Tumbling Down"	Ken Girotti	Kevin Arkadie	July 17, 2005
42	6	"Looking for Mr. Wright"	Mike Rohl	Lawrence Hertzog	July 24, 2005
43	7	"Last Night"	Holly Dale	Charles Holland	August 7, 2005
44	8	"Fugitive"	Mike Rohl	Lisa Klink	August 14, 2005
45	9	"Analysis"	Mike Rohl	Glenn Davis & William Laurin	August 21, 2005
46	10	"Try Again"	Steven Goldmann	Charles Holland	September 11, 2005
47	11	"Patient X"	Mike Rohl	Lawrence Hertzog	September 18, 2005
48	12	"Sisterhood"	Neill Fearnley	Natalie Chaidez	September 25, 2005
49	13	"Death in the Family"	Mike Rohl	Lisa Klink	October 2, 2005
50	14	"Have You Seen This Man?"	Holly Dale	Kevin Arkadie	December 11, 2005
51	15	"Spring Break"	Bert Kish	David Donohue	January 8, 2006
52	16	"Cut"	Mike Rohl	Charles Holland	January 15, 2006
53	17	"Double Take"	Holly Dale	Lisa Klink	January 22, 2006
54	18	"Exposure"	Neill Fearnley	Lawrence Hertzog	January 29, 2006
55	19	"So Shall Ye Reap"	Holly Dale	Glenn Davis & William Laurin	February 5, 2006

== Home media ==
The only DVD release to date has been the show's second season (titled as Missing: Season 2) as a four disc set from Lions Gate Home Entertainment on January 24, 2006.

DVD name	Ep #	Discs	Region 1 (USA)	Region 2 (UK)	Region 4 (Australia)	DVD special features
Season one	18		N/A	N/A	N/A	None
Season 2: Missing	18	4	January 24, 2006	N/A	N/A	Trailers for other TV Shows
Season three	19		N/A	N/A	N/A	None

== Broadcast ==
The series started airing reruns on Start TV in April 2022 and in Latin America on Telexitos in December 2023.
