= Mr. Monk Is Miserable =

Novel by Lee Goldberg

- 1st edition 2008 hardback cover
- Author: Lee Goldberg
- Language: English
- Series: Monk mystery novel series
- Genre: Mystery novel
- Publisher: Signet Books
- Publication date: December 2, 2008
- Publication place: United States
- Media type: Print (hardcover)
- Pages: 288 pp
- ISBN: 0-451-22515-5
- OCLC: 213308710
- Dewey Decimal: 813/.54 22
- LC Class: PS3557.O3577 M78 2008
- Preceded by: Mr. Monk Goes to Germany
- Followed by: Mr. Monk and the Dirty Cop

Mr. Monk Is Miserable is the seventh novel in the Monk mystery book series by writer Lee Goldberg. It was published on December 2, 2008. The novel follows Adrian Monk and his assistant Natalie Teeger on a vacation to Paris, France. While there Natalie gets fed up with Monk running across murders everywhere he goes and refuses to help him investigate a pair of Parisian murders linked to a Freegan community, making Monk miserable.

== Plot summary ==
Having been blackmailed into stopping over in Paris, France at the conclusion of Mr. Monk Goes to Germany, Adrian Monk accompanies Natalie Teeger from Lohr, and solves a murder on the airplane flight en route.

Natalie has been in Paris before, during her elopement with Mitch, but finds the city has changed. Natalie and Monk visit numerous tourist attractions, including the Paris Sewer Museum and the Paris Catacombs, a massive ossuary for the city's long-dead residents. Monk spots a skull with dental fillings which were only invented in the past decade, indicating a recent homicide. Natalie refuses to perform her assistant duties, and demands that Monk let her enjoy her vacation. The next day, she drags him to dinner in a novelty restaurant called Toujours Nuit ("Always Night") because the dining room is kept in total darkness, and all the waiters are blind. They are seated with a woman named Aimee Dupon, who says she can tell Monk who the murdered man was. A moment later, she is stabbed to death with a steak knife. However, the staff insist no one entered or left the dining room. Monk finds a piece of horse manure on the restaurant floor.

When Monk does an over-the-phone session with Dr. Kroger, Dr. Kroger asks to speak with Natalie. He reprimands Natalie for her refusal to help Monk with these homicides, arguing that Monk cannot be expected to stop investigating crimes.

Captain Stottlemeyer and Lieutenant Disher fly in overnight from San Francisco because the skull found in the catacombs has been identified through dental records as belonging to Nathan Chalmers, the architect of a Ponzi scheme whose victims included many of California's wealthiest and brightest. It was believed that he committed suicide ten years ago, but the skull proves that he faked his death and escaped to Europe, a case embarrassing enough to send the two American detectives to Paris on the Commissioner's orders, in order to give credence to the claim that the police never closed Chalmers's case and their investigations led to the skull's discovery.

Video surveillance tapes show that Dupon followed Monk and Natalie around town for several hours before she was killed, but no one following Dupon. They question Laura Boucher, the senior editor at Dupon's publishing company. Boucher says that Aimee quit after the company rejected a graphic novel submitted by Antoine Bisson, a freelance artist. Bisson enjoys exploring Paris's underground community, and his novel featured a romanticized portrait of a Freegan community that occupies condemned buildings and the tunnels. Boucher and Bisson say that Aimee was carried away by the romance and decided to join the community, ignoring its grittier reality.

Lucien Barlier, the charismatic leader of the underground Freegans, claims that Chalmers, under the assumed name of Bob Smith, joined the community, and encouraged several Freegans to splinter off and follow him in actively punishing consumerists instead of just living off their refuse. The French police discover since the time Chalmers arrived in France, there was a regional spike in identity theft and credit card fraud, suggesting that he was committing identity theft with papers salvaged from people's trash cans. Monk says that Barlier is the killer, sure that any man who lives in a sewer and eats garbage has to be a murderer. Natalie, however, is charmed into accepting a dinner date with him.

On their date, in Barlier's underground home, Barlier shows her he has a TV hooked into the city's public surveillance (which Natalie realizes he could have used to locate Dupon at the Toujours Nuit without following her) and mushrooms which he fertilizes with horse manure. Monk and the detectives burst in, led there by Bisson, and arrest him for the murder of Aimee Dupon. In addition to the TV and horse manure, Barlier owns a putter with a pattern matching the wound in Chalmers's skull and dinner plates taken from the trash at Tourjours Nuit.

The detectives head to Bisson's studio, ostensibly to take his statement, and find that Bisson has made a painting of the chipped plate Monk had thrown out when he went to Toujours Nuit. Monk reveals that Bisson killed Chalmers for taking Aimee away from him, intending to frame Barlier. However, Barlier stumbled upon the body first and, realizing that he would be blamed, hid Chalmers's remains in the catacombs. After the skull was discovered, Bisson rethought his plan, now confident that Aimee would assume he was the killer rather than Barlier. He killed her and lead Monk and the other detectives to Barlier's home in the catacombs, inadvertently confirming that he knew the way there, and thus could have planted the putter and dinner plates. Bisson also owns a set of night vision goggles for his sojourns into the sewers, while Barlier does not, and so could have found his way to Dupon in the darkness of Tourjours Nuit.

Bisson confesses, then jumps out a window to his death. Barlier is exonerated, and he and Natalie spend a romantic day above ground around the city. Between solving two murders, and getting to drive a motocrotte during his off-time, Monk is satisfied, and admits that their enforced French vacation has had its points of success.

== Characters ==
=== Characters from the television show ===
- Adrian Monk: the titular detective;
- Natalie Teeger: Monk's loyal assistant, and the narrator of the book;
- Dr. Charles Kroger: Monk's psychiatrist;
- Captain Leland Stottlemeyer: Captain of the San Francisco Police Department's Homicide Division; Monk's oldest friend and former partner;
- Lieutenant Randy Disher: Stottlemeyer's right-hand man;

=== Original characters ===
- Chief Inspector Phillipe Le Roux: Chief of the homicide division of the Paris Prefecture of Police;
- Inspector Guy Gadois: Le Roux's right-hand man;
- Aimee Dupon: Murder victim #2;
- Laura Boucher: Senior editor at the publishing company where Dupon worked;
- Antoine Bisson: Freelance artist and author, Aimee's former lover;
- Lucien Barlier: Leader of an underground community of Freegans, who live on society's waste;
- Pierre: Motocrotte driver;
- Nathan Chalmers: Murder victim #1;
