= Mr. Monk Goes to Germany =

2008 novel by Lee Goldberg

- 1st edition 2008 hardback cover
- Author: Lee Goldberg
- Language: English
- Series: Monk mystery novel series
- Genre: Mystery novel
- Publisher: Signet Books
- Publication date: July 1, 2008
- Publication place: United States
- Media type: Print (hardcover)
- Pages: 288 pp
- ISBN: 0-451-22099-4
- OCLC: 190786103
- Preceded by: Mr. Monk in Outer Space
- Followed by: Mr. Monk Is Miserable

Mr. Monk Goes to Germany is the sixth novel by Lee Goldberg to be based on the television series Monk. It was published on July 1, 2008.

== Plot summary ==
When Dr. Kroger, Adrian Monk's psychiatrist, leaves for a conference in Lohr, Germany, Monk falls apart. No longer able to solve crimes, Monk decides to follow Dr. Kroger to Lohr. His assistant Natalie Teeger helps him as payback for the time that Kroger used medication to enable Monk to follow her to Hawaii (Mr. Monk Goes to Hawaii). As Monk has a fear of flying, he takes Dioxynl, a drug that relieves him of his compulsions and phobias, but limits his ability to solve crimes. Monk and Natalie land at Frankfurt International Airport, rent a car, and drive into Lohr.

The Dioxynl wears off and Monk shows up at the Franziskushöhe, where the conference is being held, to keep his appointment with Dr. Kroger. Kroger remonstrates Natalie for enabling Monk to engage in stalking behavior and says he may have to stop seeing Monk because of this. Natalie points out that he cannot refuse Monk's appointment without causing himself embarrassment, and Kroger goes ahead with the session. Monk emerges relaxed, and even solves a homicide in San Francisco over the phone.

Natalie is prepared to enjoy a German vacation, but Monk spots a man with six fingers on his right hand, matching the description of the man who hired Trudy's killer. He loses sight of the man, and concludes that the only way he can find him is to get local police to do a door-to-door search. The local homicide captain, Hauptkriminalkommisar Stoffmacher, is caught up in the homicide of Axel Vigg. Monk offers to resolve the case in order to free up the police to find the eleven-fingered man. Examining the scene, Monk finds that the fatal shot was actually fired from the adjacent apartment, with a painting moved to cover the hole in the wall. A bullet hole in the couch, attributed by the police to a test shot, was fired to get gunshot residue on Vigg's hands and make the death look like a suicide. Bruno Leupolz, the resident of the adjacent apartment, is absent, and has a change of clothes left on his unmade bed. Stoffmacher thinks Leupolz fled after accidentally killing Vigg, but Monk suspects both Leupolz and Vigg were killed by a third party, noting ashes from burned papers in the fireplace and a missing pillow which he thinks was used as a silencer due to the feathers scattered through the apartment.

Monk goes to tell Dr. Kroger about the eleven-fingered man, and sees the eleven-fingered man getting his picture taken with Dr. Kroger. This makes him and Natalie think that Kroger is part of a massive conspiracy to prevent Monk from ever re-joining the police department. The eleven-fingered man introduces himself as Dr. Martin Rahner, who runs a mountain retreat for people with physical abnormalities.

Monk tells Natalie to watch the hiking trails leading to the Franziskushöhe and follow Rahner if he leaves. On a trail she stumbles upon Bruno Leupolz's dead body. Leupolz's shoes are tied with Norwegian reef knots, and his running shoes are clean despite the copious mud on the trail, suggesting that someone dressed him and carried him to the trail post mortem. Monk suggests the police dredge the nearby pond for the laptop and pillow that were missing from Leupolz's apartment, but Stoffmacher doubts that Leupolz was murdered, since there are no wounds on his body, shattering Monk's original theory that Leupolz was shot.

The conspiracy theory is strengthened when Captain Stottlemeyer and Lieutenant Disher research Rahner and find that he was in the Bay Area two weeks before Trudy's death, on a lecture tour funded by Monk's old enemy, Dale "The Whale" Biederbeck. Monk confronts Kroger and Rahner, and insists that having six fingers on one hand is a unique condition that unambiguously ties Rahner to Trudy's murder. To prove him wrong, Dr. Kroger and Rahner take Monk and Natalie on a tour of Rahner's mountain retreat and introduce him to another man with six fingers on his right hand. Monk not only is unconvinced that Rahner did not kill Trudy, but is now convinced that Rahner killed Bruno Leupolz, since Rahner's shoes are tied with Norwegian reef knots.

However, the coroner's report shows Leupolz died of a heart attack, and no signs of toxins. Monk remains convinced it was murder, arguing that Rahner could have triggered the heart attack with a warning shot, coincidentally killing Vigg with the same shot, then transferred Rahner to the hiking trail in an effort to hide the connection between the two deaths. Leupolz's profession, journalism, provides a likely motive. Stoffmacher argues the evidence for this theory is insufficient, so Monk and Natalie fly to Berlin and question Leupolz's editor in hopes of confirming a motive. The editor affirms that Leupolz was trying to prove Rahner's credentials were fake and he was embezzling money from his clinic.

Monk takes Dioxynl to enable him to fly back to Lohr and search for the place where Rahner hid Leupolz's body until morning. He and Natalie find a rotting wooden shack. While searching it for evidence, someone locks them in and sets the shack on fire. To escape, Monk and Natalie smash through the shack wall and fall into the pond muck, where Monk stumbles upon a trash bag containing the missing laptop and pillow, and a set of gloves modified to contain a sixth finger on the right hand. As further proof of Rahner's guilt, the photo of him with Kroger shows pillow feathers on his clothes.

While under the influence of Dioxynl, Monk cheerfully allows himself to be photographed in his muck-splattered state. Natalie uses the photo to blackmail Monk into agreeing to stopping for a few days in Paris, France, on their way home.

The conspiracy plotline is left unresolved; in the final chapter Natalie mentions that Monk "proved that Dr. Kroger didn't betray [him]", but how Monk did this is never shown. Whether or not Rahner is the man who hired Trudy's killer is also left unanswered.

== Continuity ==
- The three assistants that Natalie has coffee with in the beginning of the novel (Sparrow, Arnie, and Jasper) previously appeared in the novel Mr. Monk and the Blue Flu.
- The book's conclusion is a direct lead-in to the succeeding novel, Mr. Monk is Miserable.
- The book was written before, but published after, the airing of the TV episode "Mr. Monk Is on the Run," which featured the re-appearance of Dale "The Whale" and introduced additional clues in Monk's search for Trudy's killer. Because of this, Goldberg's foreword acknowledges some discontinuity between the events of this novel and the events of the series. The forewords put the events of this novel and the direct sequel Mr. Monk is Miserable before the events of "Mr. Monk Is on the Run" and after the events of the season 6 episode "Mr. Monk Paints His Masterpiece".

== List of characters ==
=== Characters from the television series ===
- Adrian Monk: the titular detective
- Natalie Teeger: Monk's loyal assistant, and the narrator of the book
- Dr. Charles Kroger: Monk's psychiatrist
- Captain Leland Stottlemeyer: Captain of the San Francisco Police Department's Homicide Division, Monk's oldest friend and former partner
- Lieutenant Randy Disher: Stottlemeyer's right-hand man
- Julie Teeger: Natalie's teenaged daughter
- Dale "The Whale" Biederbeck: Monk's nemesis, a morbidly obese billionaire serving life in prison for conspiracy to murder

=== Original characters ===
- Hauptkriminalkommisar Stoffmacher: Captain of homicide, Lohr Polizei. The Captain's name is a linguist pun: the proper English translation of Hauptkriminalkommisar is Main forensics commissioner. Stoffmacher translates as German for material maker or fabric maker, and is a thinly veiled version of Stottlemeyer's name.
- Kommissar Geshir: Stoffmacher's right-hand man. Geschirr roughly translates as plural for plates or dishes, effectively making it a German translation of Randy's last name.
- Heiko and Friderike Schmidt: owners of the bed-and-breakfast that Monk and Natalie take up residence at.
- Dr. Martin Rahner: German psychiatrist, specializing in counseling for people born with physical abnormalities; has six fingers on his right hand.
