= Brash Books =

American publishing company

- Founded: 2014
- Founders: Lee Goldberg, Joel Goldman
- Country of origin: United States
- Headquarters location: Calabasas, CA
- Distribution: Ingram Content Group
- Publication types: ebook, trade paperback, audio
- Nonfiction topics: Mystery, Thriller, Crime, Suspense
- Imprints: Brash Audio, Cutting Edge
- Official website: www.brash-books.com

Brash Books is an American crime fiction imprint founded in 2014 by authors Lee Goldberg and Joel Goldman. The main focus of Brash Books is to republish award-winning and critically acclaimed novels, primarily from the 1970s, 1980s and 1990s, which had fallen out of print. The imprint also publishes new crime fiction and suspense novels.

The imprint launched in September 2014 with 29 reprints, including the Nero Award-winning Sleeping Dog by Dick Lochte, Edgar Award finalist Lover Man by Dallas Murphy, and the new novel Treasure Coast by Tom Kakonis. The company has since published other books, such as Mark Smith's Death of the Detective, a National Book Award finalist, Barbara Neely's Blanche on the Lam, (a Mystery Writers of America Grandmaster Honoree and recipient of the Agatha and Anthony Award), MWA Grandmaster Honoree Max Allan Collins' novel Road to Perdition in a new, expanded edition (incorporating material from his original graphic novel, elements from his novelization of the feature screenplay, and new material), and Carolyn Weston's Poor, Poor Ophelia, which inspired the television series The Streets of San Francisco. Brash has published 288 titles as of November 2025. Brash's titles are available as paperbacks through the Ingram Content Group and Baker & Taylor.

Goldberg and Goldman, longtime friends, hatched the idea for Brash Books after a discussion at the 2013 Bouchercon convention in Albany, New York. When Goldberg mentioned to Goldman that he wanted to find a way to republish some of his favorite out-of-print titles, Goldman, a former lawyer, offered to help him create the business. The company's name was inspired by their slogan, "We publish the best crime novels in existence", which Goldberg describes as "a brash claim, but we believe our novels back it up." Goldberg serves as the publisher's book scout and handles most of its social media, while Goldman deals with financial and legal matters.

Other authors published by Brash include top ten New York Times bestselling authors Robin Burcell, Tim Sandlin, Parnell Hall, and Phoef Sutton, famed BBC presenter and interviewer Barry Norman, National Book Award finalist David Wagoner, and Edgar Award finalists Noreen Ayers, Bill Crider, and Jack Lynch.

In 2017, they launched the subsidiary Brash Audio and produced a dozen audiobooks in their first year. They also published Leo W. Banks' original novel Double Wide, which won two 2018 Spur Awards, for Best First Novel and Best Contemporary Western, from the Western Writers of America. Double Wide was also named True West magazine's Best Contemporary Western of the Year.

In 2019, they republished the twelve Hardman crime novels by Ralph Dennis, as well as four of his long-lost, unpublished works. The Hardman books included introductions by author Joe R. Lansdale, among others. A newly discovered thirteenth Hardman novel, All Kinds of Ugly, was released in February 2020 with revisions by Goldberg. That same month, they also released Fireball, a lost, previously unpublished book by Hammer Horror writer/director/producer Jimmy Sangster that is the fourth adventure in his James Reed series (Snowball, Blackball and Hardball), that was published in the late 1980s.

== Cutting Edge Imprint ==
They launched their Cutting Edge imprint in 2020 to issue new editions of out-of-print books published before 1970 in a wide range of genres, release new, never-before-published western novels, as well as new and previously out-of-print television reference books.

Their initial re-releases included books by Robert Dietrich (aka E. Howard Hunt), Ovid Demaris, March Hasting (aka Sally Singer), and Richard Himmel that were originally published in the 1950s and early 1960s before falling out-of-print.

The Comanche Kid by James Robert Daniels, their first original western novel, was a 2022 finalist for the Spur Award for Best Traditional Western Novel. The sequel, Jane Fury, was a finalist for the same award in 2024.

In 2023, a woman in Atlanta was cleaning out her dead grandfather's attic when she stumbled upon a dusty, yellowed, type-written manuscript by Ralph Dennis. She sent the book to Goldberg, who identified it as Dennis' long-lost, unpublished, literary first novel Wind Sprints and subsequently published for the first time through Cutting Edge. The imprint later released The New Five, another previously unpublished Dennis novel, this one about college basketball in the 1980s.

In 2025, Cutting Edge was lauded by Texas Monthly magazine for rediscovering and republishing the long out-of-print works of forgotten author Jack Sheridan As of November 2025, the Cutting Edge imprint has released 522 titles.

== Selected Brash Books Authors ==
- Tom Ardies
- Noreen Ayres
- Leo Banks
- Keith Bruton
- Craig Faustus Buck
- Jack Bunker
- Robin Burcell
- Max Allan Collins
- Michael Craft
- Bill Crider
- Ralph Dennis
- Gerald Duff
- Robert Dunn
- Dawn Farnham
- Bob Forward
- Michael Genelin
- Parnell Hall
- Gar Anthony Haywood
- Harry Hunsicker
- Tom Kakonis
- Tony Knighton
- Stan Lee
- Dick Lochte
- Jack Lynch
- Geoffrey Miller
- Margaret Moseley
- Dallas Murphy
- A.W. Mykel
- Barbara Neely
- Barry Norman
- Maxine O'Callaghan
- Stephen O'Shea
- William Reynolds
- W.L. Ripley
- Jim Sanderson
- John Sanford
- Jimmy Sangster
- Mark Smith
- Craig Smith
- Michael Stone
- Andy Straka
- Phoef Sutton
- Doug J. Swanson
- Ted Thackrey Jr.
- Phillip Thompson
- Jack Trolley
- Jane Waterhouse
- Carolyn Weston

== Selected Cutting Edge Authors ==
- Burt Arthur
- James Warner Bellah
- Morton Cooper
- Ovid Demaris
- Ralph Dennis
- Bonnie Golightly
- Charles Gorham
- Ward Greene
- March Hastings (aka Sally Singer)
- Homer Hatten
- Richard Himmell
- E. Howard Hunt
- Hilda Lawrence
- Charles Mergendahl
- Jon Messmann
- James Rubel
- Forbes Rydell
- Sarah Salt
- Jack Sheridan
- David Derek Stacton
- Tiffany Thayer
- John Burton Thompson
- Walker A. Tompkins
- David Wagoner
- Jack Woodford
