= Mr. Monk on Patrol =

2012 novel by Lee Goldberg

- 1st edition 2012 hard cover
- Author: Lee Goldberg
- Language: English
- Series: Monk mystery novel series
- Genre: Mystery novel
- Publisher: Signet Books
- Publication date: January 3, 2012
- Publication place: United States
- Media type: Print (hardcover)
- Preceded by: Mr. Monk on the Couch
- Followed by: Mr. Monk is a Mess

Mr. Monk on Patrol is the thirteenth novel written by Lee Goldberg to be based on the television series Monk. It was published on January 3, 2012. Like the other novels, the story is narrated by Natalie Teeger, Monk's assistant.

== Plot summary ==
The town of Summit, New Jersey is hit with a string of arrests of high-profile politicians, leaving Randy Disher serving as the town's mayor. Since Summit's police are understaffed, and the controversy brought forth more criminal activity, Disher's girlfriend flies to San Francisco to convince Adrian Monk and Natalie Teeger to help their friend Randy, by serving as temporary police officers for the town. While working as police officers, Monk and Natalie discover a body, and Monk soon receives a threat on his own life that is meant to scare him away.

Adrian Monk ignores the threats and keeps investigating, until he solves the murder. Weeks after the arrest, Captain Stottlemeyer asks Natalie and Monk whether they’re going to return to San Francisco. Monk makes a decision, which will be revealed in the next novel.

== Mr. Monk and the Open House ==
Mr. Monk and the Open House is an excerpt from Mr. Monk on Patrol that was published as a short story in the December 2011 issue of Ellery Queen's Mystery Magazine before the release of the book.

== List of characters ==
=== Characters from the television series ===
- Adrian Monk: the titular detective, played on the series by Tony Shalhoub
- Natalie Teeger: Monk's loyal assistant and the narrator of the book, played on the series by Traylor Howard
- Randy Disher: The acting mayor of Summit, New Jersey, played on the series by Jason Gray-Stanford
- Leland Stottlemeyer: Homicide Captain on the San Francisco Police force, played in the series by Ted Levine

=== Original characters ===
- Amy Devlin: A lieutenant who is Stottlemeyer's right hand in the San Francisco Police Department
- Ellen Morse: The owner of a shop selling items made with sanitized excrement. Despite her profession, Adrian develops a relationship with her based on her love of symmetry and sanitization.
