= Scam =

Attempt to defraud a person or group

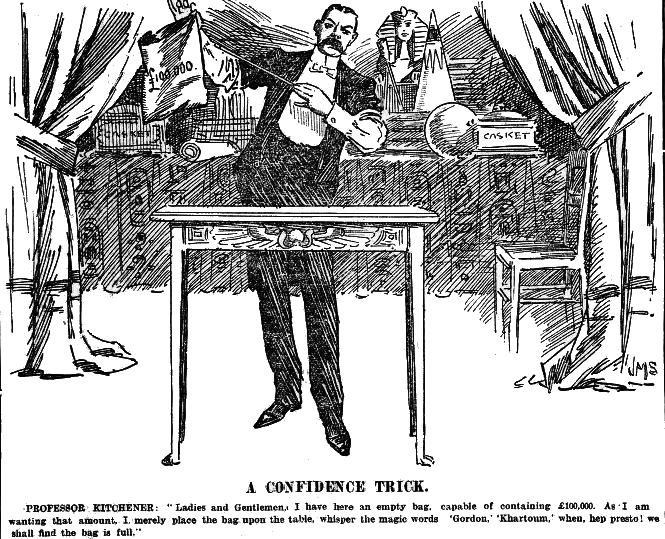
Political cartoon by J. M. Staniforth: Herbert Kitchener attempts to raise £100,000 for a college in Sudan by calling on the name of C. G. Gordon

A scam, or a confidence trick (shortened to con), is an attempt to defraud a person or group after first gaining their trust. Confidence tricks exploit victims using a combination of the victim's credulity, naivety, compassion, vanity, confidence, irresponsibility, and greed. Researchers have defined confidence tricks as "a distinctive species of fraudulent conduct ... intending to further voluntary exchanges that are not mutually beneficial", as they "benefit con operators at the expense of their victims (the 'marks')".

== Terminology ==
Other terms for "scam" include confidence trick, con, con game, confidence game, confidence scheme, ripoff, stratagem, finesse, grift, hustle, bunko, bunco, swindle, flimflam, gaffle, and bamboozle.

The perpetrator is often referred to as a scammer, scam artist, confidence man, con man, con artist, grifter, hustler, or swindler. The intended victims are known as marks, suckers, stooges, mugs, rubes, or gulls. When accomplices are employed, they are known as shills.

== Length ==
A short con or small con is a fast swindle that takes just minutes, possibly seconds. It typically aims to rob the victim of their money or other valuables they carry on their person or guard. A long con or big con (also, chiefly in British English, long game) is a scam that unfolds over several days or weeks; it may involve a team of swindlers, and even props, sets, extras, costumes, and scripted lines. It aims to rob the victim of a huge amount of money or other valuables, often by getting them to empty out bank accounts and borrow from family members.

== History ==
The shell game dates back at least to ancient Greece. William Thompson (1821–1856) was the original "confidence man". Thompson was a clumsy swindler who asked his victims to express confidence in him by giving him money or their watch rather than gaining their confidence in a more nuanced way. A few people trusted Thompson with their money and watches. Thompson was arrested in July 1849. Reporting on this arrest, James Houston, a reporter for the New York Herald, publicized Thompson by naming him the "Confidence Man". Although Thompson was an unsuccessful scammer, he gained a reputation as a genius operator mostly because Houston's satirical tone was not understood as such. The National Police Gazette coined the term "confidence game" a few weeks after Houston first used the name "confidence man".

== Stages ==
In Confessions of a Confidence Man, Edward H. Smith lists the "six definite steps or stages of growth" of a confidence game. He notes that some steps may be omitted. It is also possible that some can be done in a different order than below, or carried out simultaneously.

Foundation work
Preparations are made in advance of the game, including the hiring of any assistants required and studying the background knowledge needed for the role.
Approach
The victim is approached or contacted.
Build-up
The victim is given an opportunity to profit from participating in a scheme. The victim's greed is encouraged, potentially impairing their rational judgment of the situation.
Pay-off or convincer
The victim receives a small payout as a demonstration of the scheme's purported effectiveness. This may be a real amount of money or faked in some way (including physically or electronically). In a gambling con, the victim is allowed to win several small bets. In a stock market con, the victim is given fake dividends.
The "hurrah"
A sudden manufactured crisis or change of events forces the victim to act or make a decision immediately. This is the point at which the con succeeds or fails. With a financial scam, the con artist may tell the victim that the "window of opportunity" to make a large investment in the scheme is about to suddenly close forever.
The in-and-in
A conspirator (in on the con, but assumes the role of an interested bystander) puts an amount of money into the same scheme as the victim, to add an appearance of legitimacy. This can reassure the victim and give the con man greater control once the deal is complete.

In addition, some games require a "corroboration" step, particularly those involving a fake, but purportedly "rare item" of "great value". This usually includes the use of an accomplice who plays the part of an uninvolved (initially skeptical) third party, who later confirms the claims made by the con man.

=== In a Long Con ===
Alternatively, in The Big Con, David Maurer writes that all cons "progress through certain fundamental stages" and that there are ten stages for a "big con."

1. Locating and investigating a well-to-do victim. (Putting the mark up.)
2. Gaining the victim's confidence. (Playing the con for him.)
3. Steering him to meet the insideman. (Roping the mark.)
4. Permitting the insideman to show him how he can make a large amount of money dishonestly. (Telling him the tale.)
5. Allowing the victim to make a substantial profit. (Giving him the convincer.)
6. Determining exactly how much he will invest. (Giving him the breakdown.)
7. Sending him home for this amount of money. (Putting him on the send.)
8. Playing him against a big store and fleecing him. (Taking off the touch.)
9. Getting him out of the way as quietly as possible. (Blowing him off.)
10. Forestalling action by the law. (Putting in the fix.)

== Vulnerability factors ==
Confidence tricks exploit characteristics such as greed, dishonesty, vanity, opportunism, lust, compassion, credulity, irresponsibility, desperation, and naïvety. As such, there is no consistent profile of a confidence trick victim; the common factor is simply that the victim relies on the con artist's good faith. Victims of investment scams tend to show an incautious level of greed and gullibility, and many con artists target the elderly and other people thought to be vulnerable, using various forms of confidence tricks. Researchers Huang and Orbach argue:

Cons succeed for inducing judgment errors—chiefly, errors arising from imperfect information and cognitive biases. In popular culture and among professional con men, the human vulnerabilities that cons exploit are depicted as "dishonesty", "greed", and "gullibility" of the marks. Dishonesty, often expressed as "you can't cheat an honest man," refers to the willingness of marks to engage in unlawful acts, such as rigged gambling and embezzlement. Greed, the desire to "get something for nothing", is a shorthand expression of marks' beliefs that too-good-to-be-true gains are realistic. Gullibility reflects beliefs that marks are "suckers" and "fools" for entering into costly voluntary exchanges. Judicial opinions occasionally echo these sentiments.

== Online fraud ==
Fraud has rapidly adapted to the Internet. The Internet Crime Complaint Center (IC3) of the FBI received 847,376 reports in 2021, with reported losses of $6.9 billion in the US alone. The Global Anti Scam Alliance annual Global State of Scam Report, stated that globally $47.8 billion was lost and the number of reported scams increased from 139 million in 2019 to 266 million in 2020.

Government organizations have set up online fraud reporting websites to raise awareness about online scams and make it easier for victims to report online fraud. Examples are in the United States (FBI IC3, Federal Trade Commission), Australia (ScamWatch ACCC), Singapore (ScamAlert), United Kingdom (ActionFraud), Netherlands (FraudeHelpdesk). In addition, several private, non-profit initiatives have been set up to combat online fraud, such as AA419 (2004), APWG (2004) and ScamAdviser (2012).

The top countries for online fraud are Russia, Ukraine, China, the United States, Nigeria, Romania, North Korea, the United Kingdom, Brazil and India.

== In popular culture ==
- The Grifters is a noir fiction novel by Jim Thompson published in 1963. It was adapted into a film of the same name, directed by Stephen Frears and released in 1990. Both have characters involved in either short con or long con.
- The Sting is a 1973 American film directed by George Roy Hill largely concerned with a long con.
- Catch Me If You Can is a 2002 American film directed and produced by Steven Spielberg featuring various short cons using impersonation, forged documents, and check fraud among other tactics.
- Better Call Saul is an American legal crime drama TV show created by Vince Gilligan and Peter Gould airing from 2015–2022 featuring short and long cons. Season 1, Episode 10, titled "Marco", features many short cons. The show's main character, Jimmy McGill (Saul Goodman), attempts many short and long cons both individually and with the help of others.

== See also ==
- Advance-fee scam
- Badger game
- Boiler room (business)
- Catfishing
- Charlatan
- Confidence tricks in film and television
- Confidence tricks in literature
- Counterfeit
- Elmer Gantry (novel) – fictional religious cons
- Graft
- Hijacked journals
- List of con artists
- List of fraudsters
- List of scams
- Phishing
- Pig butchering scam
- Ripoff
- Scam baiting
- Scams in intellectual property
- SSA impersonation scam
- Technical support scam
- White-collar crime
