= Mark Smith (novelist) =

American novelist (1935–2022)

- Born: November 19, 1935
- Died: July 28, 2022 (aged 86)
- Occupation: Novelist
- Years active: 1965–2022

Mark Smith (November 19, 1935 – July 28, 2022) was an American novelist. A professor of English at the University of New Hampshire, he authored several novels spanning literary fiction and crime fiction, his works were recognized for physiological insight and narrative innovation.

Smith's debut, Toyland (1965), was followed by The Middleman (1967), Doctor Blues (1983), and Smoke Street (1984). Two of his novels The Moon Lamp (1976) and The Delphinium Girl (1980) were selected by the Book of the Month Club. His most acclaimed work, The Death of the Detective (1973) was nominated for the National Book Award in 1974, and a was a New York Times bestseller. The Death of the Detective was reprinted in 2015 by Brash Books.

Smith continued to be cited posthumously in academic and literary circles for his contributions to postmodern American fiction. Following his death in 2022, retrospectives and obituaries highlighted his unique voice and genre-defying style. A collection of his unpublished papers and drafts was donated to the University of New Hampshire's special collections archive in 2023, providing new insight into his creative process and literary development.
