= Michael Genelin =

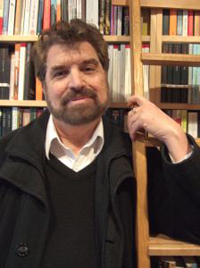
- Born: January 6, 1936; New York City, U.S.
- Died: June 7, 2026 (aged 90); Los Angeles, U.S.
- Citizenship: American
- Education: University of California, Los Angeles (BA, JD)
- Occupation: Author
- Known for: Author of International Crime Novels, Plays, Television and Motion Pictures, Lecturer, Lawyer and International Consultant in Government Reform
- Awards: Governor's Award (California), Resolution of Honor for Service (California Legislature), Award of Distinction for Service (County of Los Angeles), Certification of Award from Southern California Prison Coalition in recognition of efforts to improve the criminal justice system, Mayor's Commendation (City of Los Angeles), Certification of Award for contributions to the community (City of Los Angeles), Commendation from the Los Angeles City Attorney, Certification of Award for prevention and reduction of youth gang violence, County of Los Angeles, Chief's Commendation, California Highway Patrol, for dedicated service, Certificate of Recognition, Chief of Police, Los Angeles Police Dept. for dedication to the criminal justice system, Award of Recognition, Los Angeles County Sheriff's Department
- Website: MichaelGenelin.com

Michael Genelin (January 6, 1936 - June 7, 2026) was an American author and former Los Angeles Head Deputy District Attorney in the Hardcore Gang Division. Genelin was involved around the world in penal code reform, anti-corruption reform in government, including legislative drafting, ethics establishment and training, freedom of information laws, witness protection practices, trial advocacy, investigation and trial of cases, particularly homicides, judicial procedures, reform and creation of evidence procedures, human resources, all aspects of training, including anti-corruption investigation and prosecution and the general operations of law enforcement/prosecution/criminal court programs, investigative journalism training, and interactive governmental communications.

== Early life and education ==
Michael Genelin was born in Bronx, New York, and raised in Queens where he attended PS 36 and Newtown High School. Genelin then moved to Los Angeles where he attended UCLA, earning a BA in political science, later attending UCLA School of Law where he earned a Juris Doctor degree.

== Los Angeles District Attorney's Office ==
As a Deputy Los Angeles County District Attorney Michael Genelin prosecuted thousands of cases, many of which were in the Los Angeles Hard Core Gang Division. Genelin was chief prosecutor in the murder trial of actor Sal Mineo. Genelin was also Head of one of three major Trials Divisions in the LA District Attorney's Office and created and ran the Career Criminal Division. As Head Deputy of the Hard Core Gang Division, Genelin supervised the prosecution of all major gang crimes in Los Angeles County, primarily murders. Genelin has trained hundreds of other prosecutors and members of law enforcement agencies in gang investigation, trial practice and gang crime suppression.

== International Consultant On Government Reform ==
Upon leaving the District Attorney's office, Genelin began work as an international consultant in government reform, working under the aegis of the American Bar Association, the US State Department and the US Agency for International Development, focusing on specific legal issues, primarily as an anti-corruption expert. Genelin has worked in Tanzania, Nepal, Slovakia, South Sudan and Palestine, as well as other countries.

== Author ==
Genelin has published a number of books for Soho Press and Brash Books. Several follow the brilliant investigations of Slovak female police inspector, Jana Matinova. He has also written for the stage, motion pictures and television. Genelin has written 'Cakewalk', a play about the Leo Frank case, produced at the Mark Taper Forum. Genelin also wrote "Albert Einstein, the Aborigines and Me" at the Ensemble Studio Theater in Hollywood. Genelin also co-wrote and wrote the teleplay for two episodes of Simon and Simon, as well as writing the episode "The Man That Got Away" for the television series "Jake and the Fatman". Genelin had his script "Thin Ice" optioned by Stanley Chase Productions / Paramount Pictures.

== Bibliography ==
- Siren of the Waters (A Commander Jana Matinova Investigation) (July 1, 2008)
- Dark Dreams (A Commander Jana Matinova Investigation) (July 1, 2009)
- The Magician's Accomplice (A Commander Jana Matinova Investigation) (July 1, 2010)
- Requiem For A Gypsy (A Commander Jana Matinova Investigation) (July 1, 2011)
- For the Dignified Dead (A Commander Jana Matinova case) (November 3, 2015)
