= Lee Goldberg =

American writer

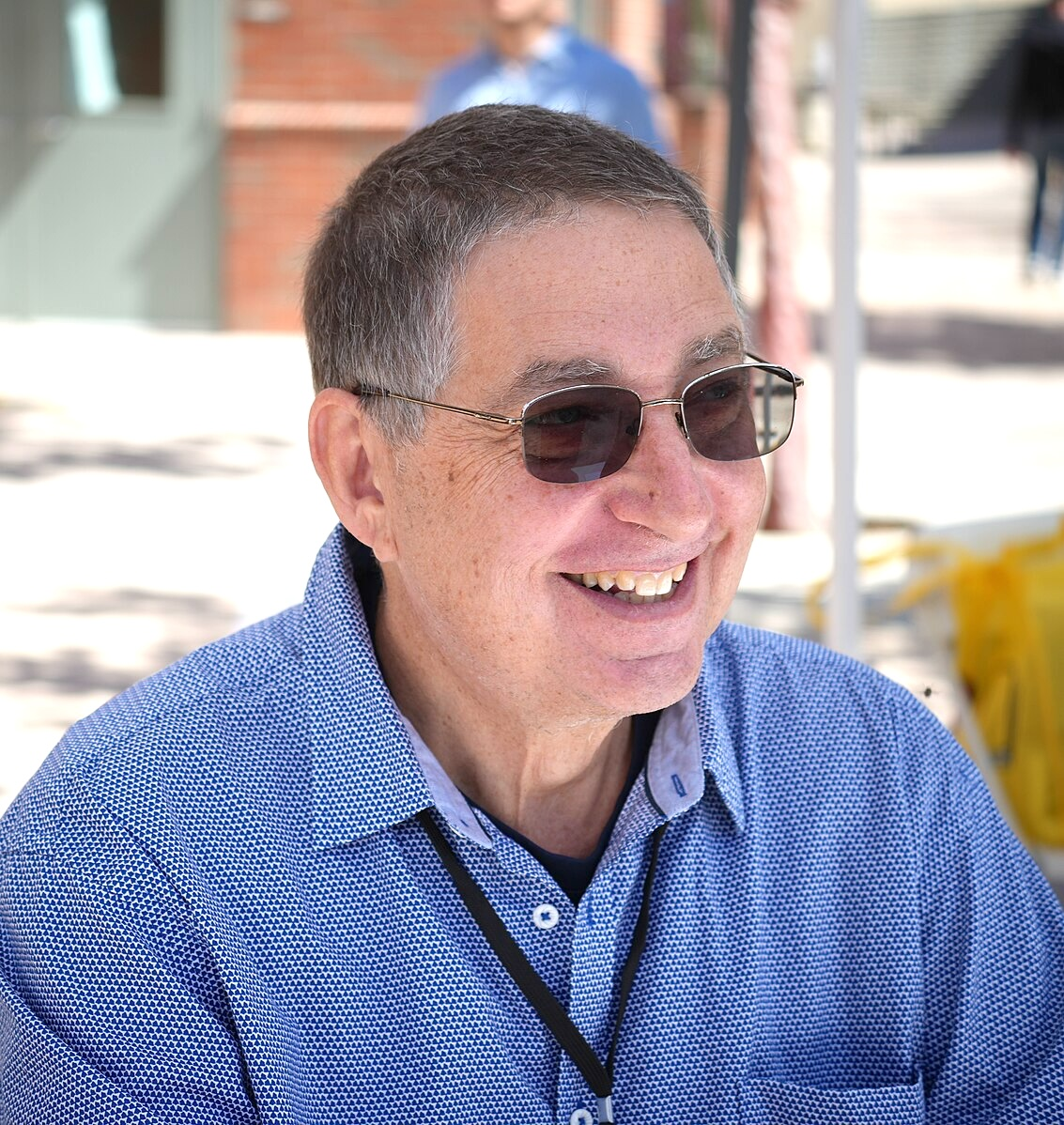
- Lee Goldberg at the San Diego Writers Festival 2025
- Born: United States
- Citizenship: American
- Education: University of California, Los Angeles
- Occupations: Author; Screenwriter; publisher
- Relatives: Tod Goldberg (Brother)
- Writing career
- Pen name: "Ian Ludlow"
- Genres: Crime fiction, television, screenwriting
- Website: leegoldberg.com

Signature
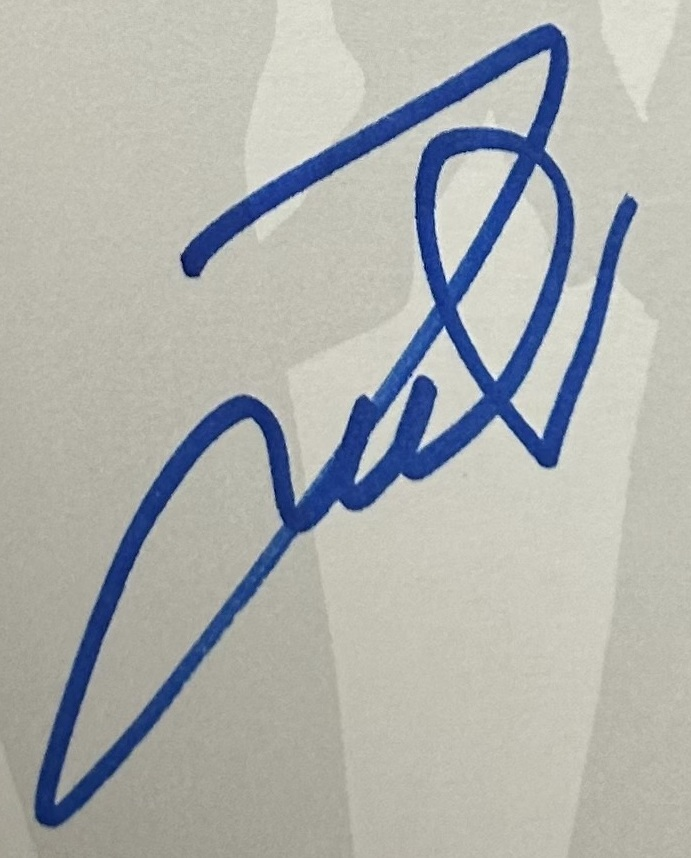

Lee Goldberg is an American author, screenwriter, publisher and producer known for his bestselling novels Lost Hills and True Fiction and his work on a wide variety of TV crime series, including Diagnosis: Murder, A Nero Wolfe Mystery, Hunter, Spenser: For Hire, Martial Law, She-Wolf of London, SeaQuest, 1-800-Missing, The Glades, Monk and You're Killing Me.

== Career ==
Goldberg began his career as a journalist, covering local news and the police beat for the Contra Costa Times (later renamed the East Bay Times) and UPI, and writing feature articles, interviews and reviews for various national publications, including the San Francisco Chronicle, Los Angeles Times, Newsweek and American Film among others.

He attended UCLA, where he was a reporter and feature writer for the Daily Bruin student newspaper, in addition to his aforementioned journalism work. There he befriended Lewis Perdue, the paper's journalism advisor from 1979 to 1982, who got Goldberg his first writing assignment for Pinnacle Books. The novel, .357 Vigilante, was published under the pseudonym "Ian Ludlow" in 1985. The novel spawned three more sequels and the series' movie rights were optioned by New World Pictures. Although the movie was never made, his script for the movie, co-written with fellow UCLA classmate William Rabkin, led to a long career in television and film. Their first television credit was on the "If You Knew Sammy" episode of Spenser: For Hire about an author of vigilante novels.

=== Film and television ===
His subsequent writing and producing credits include Murphy's Law, SeaQuest DSV, The Cosby Mysteries, and Monk. He is perhaps best known for his stint as supervising producer and executive producer of Diagnosis Murder starring Dick Van Dyke.

In 2007, Goldberg wrote and produced the pilot for a German television program, Fast Track: No Limits. which aired on television in some countries and was released as a theatrical film in others.

In 2010, he wrote and directed the short film Remaindered, based on his short story for Ellery Queen's Mystery Magazine, on location in Kentucky. He wrote and directed the sequel, Bumsicle, in 2012.

In 2019, he co-wrote and co-created with Robin Bernheim the Hallmark Movies & Mysteries telefilm series Mystery 101 starring Jill Wagner and Kristofer Polaha.

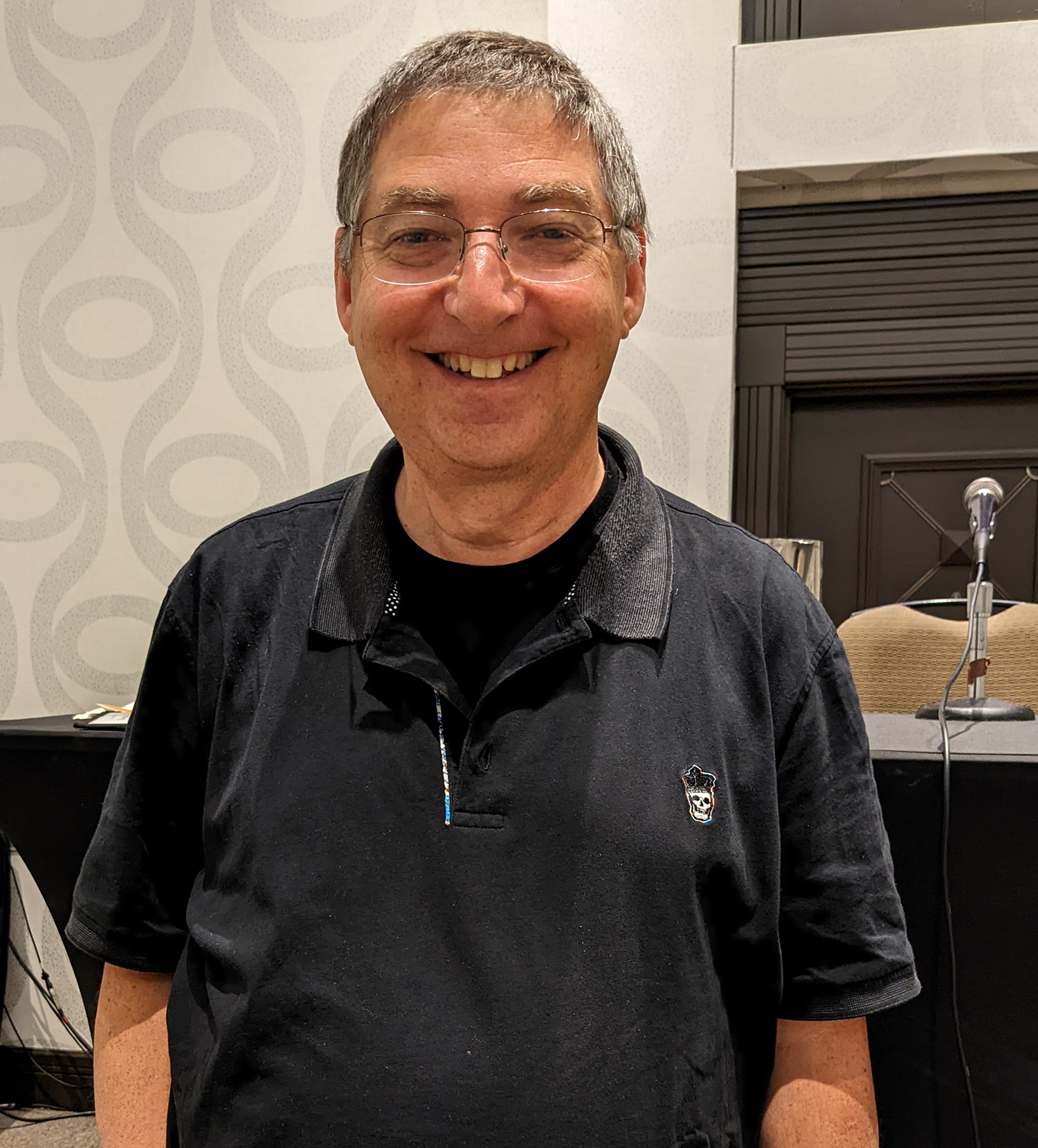
Goldberg at the 2022 Left Coast Crime conference.

In April 2021, Constantin Films announced that they will be producing a feature film version his novel The Walk based on his screenplay adaptation.

In April 2024, ID8 Media and producers Shelby Stone and Derek Dudley announced that they will be producing a TV series based upon his novel Malibu Burning

In May 2025, he became a writer & co-executive producer of the Acorn series You're Killing Me, a light-hearted mystery series created by Robin Bernheim and starring Brooke Shields, Amalia Williamson and Tom Cavanagh, which permiered in May 2026 and became the highest rated series and the biggest new subscriber draw in the streamer's history. The series was picked up for a second season after the airing of the second episode.

In July 2025, it was announced that Madison Lintz, who starred in Bosch and Bosch: Legacy, will star in and executive produce "Eve Ronin," a TV series based on Goldberg's bestselling series of novels.

=== Writing ===
In conjunction with his work on Monk and Diagnosis Murder, Goldberg wrote several original tie-in novels based on those series. He has also penned several original crime novels, two featuring ex-cop-turned-Hollywood troubleshooter Charlie Willis and the aforementioned .357 Vigilante series, which he wrote under the pseudonym Ian Ludlow, while still a UCLA undergraduate student.

His novel, The Man with the Iron-On Badge (titled Watch Me Die for its re-release), was nominated for a Shamus Award by the Private Eye Writers of America and was produced in 2008 as the stage play, Mapes For Hire, in Owensboro, Kentucky at the International Mystery Writers Festival.

Goldberg has also written non-fiction books about the entertainment industry, including Unsold Television Pilots and Successful Television Writing. His book, Unsold Television Pilots, was turned into two TV specials – The Greatest Shows You Never Saw on CBS and The Best TV Shows That Never Were on ABC, both written and produced by William Rabkin and Goldberg. They also co-created The Dead Man an original, monthly series of horror novels that rolled-out in October 2011 as the premiere titles of Amazon's new 47North sci-fi/horror/fantasy imprint. Amazon initially ordered 12 books and, in February 2012, extended the series by 12 more. The 24th title, the Kindle Serial Reborn, was published in January 2014 and is the final book in the series to date.

In June 2013, his novel The Heist, the first in a five-book series written with Janet Evanovich, was released by Random House. A prequel short story, "Pros and Cons," was published in May 2013 and became the #1 bestselling Kindle Single for seven straight weeks...and hit both the New York Times and USA Today bestseller lists. The Heist debuted at #2 on the USA Today bestseller list and #5 on the New York Times bestseller list. The sequel, The Chase, debuted at #1 on the Publishers Weekly bestseller list and #2 on The New York Times bestseller list in March 2014. The fifth book in the series, The Pursuit, was published in June 2016 and hit #1 on the New York Times bestseller list.

His novel True Fiction, was published by Amazon/Thomas & Mercer in April 2018. It was followed by Killer Thriller in February 2019 and Fake Truth in April 2020. All three books are "Ian Ludlow" thrillers, the novelist hero sharing the same name as the pseudonym that Goldberg used to write his .357 Vigilante paperbacks when he was in college in the 1980s.

His series about Detective Eve Ronin, the youngest homicide detective on the Los Angeles County Sheriff's Department history, kicked off with Lost Hills in January 2020 and was followed by Bone Canyon (January 2021) Gated Prey (Oct 2021), Movieland (June 2022). Dream Town (January 2024), Fallen Star (a cross-over with his Sharpe & Walker series, released in October 2025) and Split Screen (another Sharpe & Walker cross over, released in October 2026). A TV series version, starring Madison Lintz from Bosch, is in the works.

Malibu Burning, the first novel in a series about LASD arson investigator Walter Sharpe and his partner Andrew Walker, an ex-U.S. Marshal, was released in September 2023, and was followed by a sequel Ashes Never Lie, a cross-over with his Eve Ronin series, in September 2024. A third cross-over novel, Hidden in Smoke, was released in April 2025.

His standalone thriller Calico was released in November 2023. and was a finalist for the Western Writers of America's 2024 Spur Award for Best Contemporary Western.

Murder by Design, the first book in his new Edison Bixby series, was released in June 2026. The sequel, The Invisible Architect, will be released in March 2027.

=== Publishing ===
In September 2014, Goldberg launched the publishing company Brash Books with novelist Joel Goldman. The company publishes new crime fiction as well as award-winning, highly acclaimed crime, thriller and suspense novels that have fallen out of print.

In 2018, Goldberg acquired the copyright to the published and unpublished books by the late author Ralph Dennis, who is best known for his Hardman series of crime novels, which were a major influence on the work of novelist Joe R. Lansdale and screenwriter Shane Black. The Hardman series, with introductions by Joe R. Lansdale, Ben Jones and Robert J. Randisi, among others, as well as Dennis' thriller The War Heist (Goldberg's edited down and revised version of Dennis' 1976 novel MacTaggart's War) were released by Brash Books in 2019. In February 2020, Brash Books released "All Kinds of Ugly," a long-lost, final Hardman novel, which Goldberg discovered and revised.

In December 2020, he launched another publishing imprint, Cutting Edge Books, to release vintage crime novels, thrillers, westerns, and literary fiction from the 40s, 50s, and early 60s that had fallen out-of-print, including the work of authors Robert Dietrich (E. Howard Hunt), James Howard, March Hastings (Sally Singer), Stuart James, Bud Clifton (David Derek Stacton), and Richard Himmel.

== Awards ==
Goldberg has been nominated twice for an Edgar Award by the Mystery Writers of America and twice for a Shamus Award by the Private Eye Writers of America. He was the 2012 recipient of the Poirot Award from Malice Domestic and was a finalist for the 2026 Sue Grafton Memorial Award from the Mystery Writers of America for his novel Fallen Star.

He has served as a board member for the Mystery Writers of America and also founded, alongside novelist Max Allan Collins, the International Association of Media Tie-in Writers.

In July 2021, he was selected by the City of Agoura, California as their 2021 One City One Book honoree for his novel Lost Hills.

In March 2024, his novel Calico was honored by the Western Writers of America as a finalist for their Spur Award for Best Contemporary Western.

== Personal life ==
Goldberg has three younger siblings – Tod Goldberg, Linda Woods and Karen Dinino—all of whom are writers. His uncle is true crime author Burl Barer.

He lives with his wife and daughter in Calabasas.

== Bibliography ==
=== Edison Bixby ===
- Murder by Design (June 2026)
- The Invisible Architect (Coming March 2027)

=== Ray Boyd ===
- Crown Vic A collection of two novellas, Ray Boyd isn't Stupid and Occasional Risk, about a roaming criminal named Ray Boyd, whom Goldberg calls 'the anti-Reacher.' (Dec. 2023)
- Crown Vic 2: If I Were a Rich Man Contains one novella, originally published in the anthology Eight Very Bad Nights (July 2025)

=== Sharpe & Walker ===
- Malibu Burning (September 2023)
- Ashes Never Lie (September 2024) [A cross-over with the Eve Ronin series]
- Hidden in Smoke (April 2025) [A cross-over with the Eve Ronin series]
- Fallen Star (Oct 2025) [A cross-over with the Eve Ronin series]
- Split Screen (Oct 2026) [A cross-over with the Eve Ronin series]

=== Eve Ronin ===
- Lost Hills (January 2020)
- Bone Canyon (January 2021)
- Gated Prey (October 2021)
- Movieland (June 2022)
- Dream Town (January 2024)
- Ashes Never Lie (September 2024) [A cross-over with the Sharpe & Walker series]
- Hidden in Smoke (April 2025) [A cross-over with the Sharpe & Walker series]
- Fallen Star (October 2025) [A cross-over with the Sharpe & Walker series]
- Split Screen (October 2026) [A cross-over with the Sharpe & Walker series]

=== The Ian Ludlow Thrillers ===
- True Fiction (April 2018)
- Killer Thriller (February 2019)
- Fake Truth (April 2020)

=== Fox & O'Hare ===
- "Pros and Cons" Short Story prequel (written with Janet Evanovich) (2013)
- The Heist (written with Janet Evanovich) (June 2013)
- The Chase (written with Janet Evanovich) (Feb 25, 2014)
- "The Shell Game" Short Story prequel (written with Janet Evanovich) (2014)
- The Job (written with Janet Evanovich) (Nov. 2014)
- The Caper Short Story prequel (written with Janet Evanovich)
- The Scam (written with Janet Evanovich) (Sept 15, 2015)
- The Pursuit (written with Janet Evanovich) (June 21, 2016)

=== Diagnosis Murder Book Series ===
- #1 The Silent Partner (2003)
- #2 The Death Merchant (2004)
- #3 The Shooting Script (2004)
- #4 The Waking Nightmare (2005)
- #5 The Past Tense (2005)
- #6 The Dead Letter (2006)
- #7 The Double Life (2006)
- #8 The Last Word (2007)

=== Monk Book Series ===
- Mr. Monk Goes to the Firehouse (2006)
- Mr. Monk Goes to Hawaii (2006)
- Mr. Monk and the Blue Flu (2007)
- Mr. Monk and the Two Assistants (2007), Winner Scribe Award in 2008.
- Mr. Monk in Outer Space (2007)
- Mr. Monk Goes to Germany (2008)
- Mr. Monk is Miserable (2008)
- Mr. Monk and the Dirty Cop (2009)
- Mr. Monk in Trouble (2009) Excerpt: The Case of the Piss-Poor Gold, Ellery Queen Mystery Magazine, November 2009
- Mr. Monk is Cleaned Out (2010)
- Mr. Monk on the Road (2011) Excerpt: Mr. Monk and the Seventeen Steps, Ellery Queen Mystery Magazine, December 2010
- Mr. Monk on the Couch (2011) Excerpt: Mr. Monk and the Sunday Paper, Ellery Queen Mystery Magazine, July 2011
- Mr. Monk on Patrol (2012) Excerpt: Mr. Monk and the Open House Ellery Queen Mystery Magazine December 2011
- Mr. Monk is a Mess (July 2012) Excerpt: Mr. Monk and the Talking Car Ellery Queen Mystery Magazine May 2012
- Mr. Monk Gets Even (January 2013) Excerpt "Mr. Monk Sees the Light" Ellery Queen Mystery Magazine, December 2012

=== Charlie Willis ===
- My Gun Has Bullets (1995) Reprinted (2003) Kindle Edition (2009)
- Beyond the Beyond (1997) Kindle edition (2009) (retitled Dead Space)

=== The Dead Man Series ===
- Face of Evil (with William Rabkin) (2011)
- Ring of Knives (with William Rabkin and James Daniels) (2011)
- Hell in Heaven (with William Rabkin) (2011)
- The Dead Woman (with William Rabkin and David McAfee) (2011)
- The Blood Mesa (with William Rabkin and James Reasoner) (2011)
- Kill Them All (with William Rabkin and Harry Shannon) (2011)
- Beast Within (with William Rabkin and James Daniels) (2011)
- Fire & Ice (with William Rabkin and Jude Hardin) (2012)
- Carnival of Death (with William Rabkin and Bill Crider) (2012)
- Freaks Must Die (with William Rabkin and Joel Goldman) (2012)
- Slaves to Evil (with William Rabkin and Lisa Klink) (2012)
- The Midnight Special (with William Rabkin and Phoef Sutton) (2012)
- The Death Match (with William Rabkin and Christa Faust) (2012)
- The Black Death (with William Rabkin and Aric Davis) (2012)
- The Killing Floor (with William Rabkin and David Tully) (2012)
- Colder Than Hell (with William Rabkin and Anthony Neil Smith) (Jan 2013)
- Evil to Burn (with William Rabkin and Lisa Klink) (March 2013)
- Streets of Blood (with William Rabkin and Barry Napier) (June 2013)
- Crucible of Fire (with William Rabkin and Mel Odom) (2013)
- The Dark Need (with William Rabkin and Stant Litore) (2013)
- The Rising Dead (with William Rabkin and Stella Green) (2014)
- Reborn (with William Rabkin, Kate Danley, Phoef Sutton, and Lisa Klink) (2014)

=== The Jury Series ===
- .357 Vigilante (1985) Kindle Edition 2010 (retitled Judgment)
- .357 Vigilante: Make Them Pay (1985) Kindle Edition 2010 (retitled Adjourned)
- .357 Vigilante: White Wash (1985) Kindle Edition 2010 (retitled Payback)
- .357 Vigilante: Killstorm Unpublished, released in a Kindle Edition 2010 (retitled Guilty)

=== Non-fiction ===
- Unsold TV Pilots (1992)
- Unsold Television Pilots 1955–1989 (1990)
- Television Series Revivals (1993) retitled "Television Fast Forward" in the 2010 ebook edition
- Science Fiction Film-Making in the 1980s (1994) – co-written with William Rabkin, Randy & Jean-Marc Lofficier
- The Dreamweavers: Fantasy Film-Making in the 1980s (1994) – co-written with William Rabkin, Randy & Jean-Marc Lofficier
- Successful Television Writing (2003) – co-written with William Rabkin
- Tied In- The Business, Craft, and History of Media Tie-In Writing (2010) – editor
- The James Bond Films 1962-1989 (2022)
- The Joy of Sets: Interviews on the sets of 1980s Genre Movies (2022)
- Diagnosis Murder: Classic TV Before Its Time … Comfort Entertainment With A Twist (Foreword to a book by Linda Alexander)
- Channeling the Eighties: Inside the Shows and Business of 1980s Television (Sept 2026)
- These Are The Interviews: Conversations with Actors, Directors, Producers & Writers of STAR TREK (Sept 2026)
- The Fantastic Eighties: Interviews with Directors of 1980s Genre Movies (Sept 2026)
- Acting Out: Interviews with Stars of Television and Film (Sept 2026)
- Creating Primetime: Interviews with TV Showrunners of the 1950s-1980s (Sept 2026)

=== Standalones ===
- The Walk (2004) Kindle Edition 2009
- The Man with the Iron-On Badge (2005) Kindle Edition 2011 (retitled Watch Me Die)
- Top Suspense: 13 Stories by 12 Masters of the Genre (2011) Contributor
- Thrillers: 100 Must Reads (2010) contributor
- Die, Lover, Die! (2011) contributor
- McGrave (2012)
- King City (2012)
- Ella Clah: The Pilot Script (with William Rabkin, Aimee Thurlo & David Thurlo) (2013)
- Hollywood vs the Author (2018) contributor
- The Buy Back Blues (Afterword to novel by Ralph Dennis) (2019)
- All Kinds of Ugly (Afterword to novel by Ralph Dennis) (2020)
- Tales of a Sad, Fat Wordman (Introduction to novel by Ralph Dennis) (2020)
- Collectibles Edited by Lawrence Block (Contributor, Short story Lost Shows) (2021)
- Calico (2023)
- Eight Very Bad Nights Edited by Tod Goldberg (Contributor, novella, If I Were a Rich Man, his third featuring Ray Boyd) (2024)

== Filmography ==
Year	Title	Role/Job	# of Episodes Written/ Notes
1987–1988	Spenser: For Hire	Writer	3 episodes, including the unsold spin-off pilot "Play It Again, Sammy"
1988	The Highwayman	Writer	1 episode, "Haunted Highway"
1988–1989	Murphy's Law	Staff Writer	5 episodes, ABC TV series starring George Segal based on the "Trace" and "Digger" books by Warren Murphy (Staff Writer: 13 eps)
1989	Hunter	Writer, Story Editor	1 episode, "On Air"
1989–1990	Baywatch	Writer, Executive Story Editor	4 episodes, including the final NBC episode, entitled "The End," before the series went into first-run syndication (Executive Story Editor: 22 eps)
1990–1991	She-Wolf of London	Writer, Supervising Producer	11 episodes (Supervising Producer: 20 eps)
1991–1992	Likely Suspects	Writer, Supervising Producer	5 episodes, including "Smells Like Teen Spirit," an Edgar Award Finalist for Best Teleplay
1993–1994	Cobra	Writer, Supervising Producer	7 episodes (Supervising Producer: 22 eps)
1994–1995	Diagnosis: Murder	Writer	4 episodes
1995	The Cosby Mysteries	Writer, Supervising Producer	2 episodes
1995	Sliders	Writer	1 episodes, "Prince of Wails"
1995	Deadly Games	Writer	2 episodes, "The Boss" and "The Car Mechanic"
1995	Stick With Me, Kid	Writer, Supervising producer	3 episodes
1995	SeaQuest DSV	Writer, Supervising producer	3 episodes
1995	The Greatest Shows You Never Saw	Writer, Producer	CBS TV Special, based on his book "Unsold Television Pilots"
1995–1996	Flipper	Writer	2 episodes
1996–1999	Diagnosis: Murder	Writer, Supervising Producer, Executive Producer	26 episodes (Supervising Producer: 22 eps, Executive Producer: 47 eps)
1999	Martial Law	Writer, Executive Producer	3 episodes (Executive Producer: 22 eps)
2001–2002	A Nero Wolfe Mystery	Writer	6 episodes, including "Prisoners Base," an Edgar Award Finalist for Best Teleplay
2002	The Nightmare Room	Writer	1 episode, "My Name is Evil"
2003	She Spies	Writer	1 Episode, "Crossed Out"
2003–2005	1-800-Missing aka Missing	Writer / Supervising Producer	8 episodes (Supervising Producer: 36 eps)
2003–2006	Monk	Writer	3 episodes "Mr. Monk Can't See a Thing" (based on his book Mr. Monk Goes to the Firehouse), "Mr. Monk Meets the Godfather," "Mr. Monk Goes to Mexico"
2004	The Best TV Shows That Never Were	Writer, Executive Producer	ABC TV Special, Based on his book Unsold Television Pilots
2007	Psych	Writer	1 episode, "Forget Me Not"
2008	Fast Track: No Limits	Writer, Executive Producer	TV movie, ProSeiben Germany, M6 France, Showcase Canada
2010–2012	The Glades	Writer	3 episodes
2019–2022	Mystery 101	Writer / Co-Creator	Pilot Movie, Hallmark Movies & Mysteries series co-created with Robin Bernheim
2024	Vesma Neprost	Writer / Story By	1 episode, a Russian adaptation of his Forget Me Not episode of Psych
2026-	You're Killing Me	Writer/Executive Producer	4 episodes, AMC/Acorn
