= Mr. Monk in Trouble =

2009 novel by Lee Goldberg

- 1st edition 2009 hard cover
- Author: Lee Goldberg
- Language: English
- Series: Monk mystery novel series
- Genre: Mystery novel
- Publisher: Signet Books
- Publication date: December 1, 2009
- Publication place: United States
- Media type: Print (hardcover)
- Preceded by: Mr. Monk and the Dirty Cop
- Followed by: Mr. Monk is Cleaned Out

Mr. Monk in Trouble is the ninth novel based on the television series Monk. It was written by Lee Goldberg, and was published by Signet Books on December 1, 2009. Like the other Monk novels, the story is narrated by Natalie Teeger, the assistant of the title character, Adrian Monk.

== Plot summary ==
Adrian Monk and Natalie Teeger are celebrating Halloween in Monk's apartment. When a grown man trick-or-treats dressed in bloody clothing and carrying a knife, Monk knocks him out with one punch and has Natalie call Captain Stottlemeyer. Randy Disher finds a woman who lives a few houses down from Monk stabbed to death. Monk claims his visitor is the woman's boyfriend and he killed her during an argument, based on the splatter patterns of the blood. Stottlemeyer arrests him.

Two days later, Stottlemeyer sends Monk and Natalie to Trouble, California, a small town known for an unsolved 1962 train robbery, to investigate the murder of a friend of his, Manny Feikema. Manny became a museum security guard in Trouble after retiring from the San Francisco police. There, Natalie falls in love with the police chief, Harley Kelton. Kelton informs Monk and Natalie that the murder weapon was a pickaxe taken from one of the museum exhibits, but it has been wiped clean of fingerprints and the killer did not set off the alarms. The exhibits include the engine for the Golden Rail Express, a gold rush-era train that was the subject of the 1962 robbery. Monk becomes obsessed with solving the 1962 case to the exclusion of Manny's murder, in the process learning from the town historian Doris Thurlo that in the 1850s, Trouble was home to Artemis Monk, an assayer who possessed skills invaluable to the small town, had a widowed assistant named Abigail Guthrie, was an exact look-alike of Adrian, and exhibited many of the same obsessive compulsive traits as Adrian.

Mechanic Bob Gorman tells Monk a man in a 1964 Ford Thunderbird was asking for directions to Manny's place a few days before his murder. Kelton matches this information to Gator Dunsen, a recently released convict who Manny put away. Kelton, Monk, and Natalie visit Gator's house, but he fires upon them and is killed in the ensuing shootout. Kelton is reprimanded for approaching Gator without backup. Photos in Gator's house seem to show he was casing the museum, but Monk realizes Gator is being framed when he notices the pickaxe is not in the photos, proving they were taken after the murder. Clifford Adams, the engineer of the Golden Rail Express, calls Natalie offering to reveal the killer's identity. But when they arrive, they find Clifford murdered, Monk falls into a mine shaft, and Natalie dislocates her shoulder pulling him out.

Natalie is treated and confined to bed, during which Monk leaves her a note implying he intends to confront the murderer. Fearing for Monk's life, Natalie takes Kelton to the museum. There Monk, Stottlemeyer, Disher, and the state police emerge from hiding to arrest Gorman and Kelton, and recover the gold as a separate display for the museum. Monk explains that the gold from the robbery was melted down and used to line the train's furnace, which the robbers were planning to retrieve afterward as the train was supposed to be scrapped after that run. The robbery's publicity allowed the train to remain in business, and they never got the chance. When Kelton deduced the truth, he partnered with Gorman to steal the gold. Gorman killed Manny to replace him and make it easier to access the train. He and Kelton used Gator as a scapegoat, tying him up before Gorman fired the shots from inside the house, and untied him just before he fled the house. Kelton saw Clifford leaving the museum and feared he had found them out, so he killed Clifford and faked his voice to lure Monk and Natalie to the concealed mine shafts. Monk realized Kelton killed Clifford when he found a rock near the scene that he previously saw caught in Kelton's tire tread.

The next day, Natalie berates Monk after he admits to using her to lure Kelton to the museum in order to expose his involvement, and forces him to apologize by throwing French fries at him.

== The Case of the Piss-Poor Gold ==
The novel featured a short story entitled The Case of the Piss-Poor Gold, which was published before the novel was released in the November 2009 issue of Ellery Queen's Mystery Magazine. In the story, Artemis Monk, an assayer in the California gold rush town of Trouble in the 1840s, goes from determining the value of rocks to solving a murder.

== Characters ==
=== Characters from the television show ===
- Adrian Monk, the titular detective
- Natalie Teeger, Monk's assistant and the perspective character
- Captain Leland Stottlemeyer, Monk's police friend and ex-partner
- Lieutenant Randy Disher, Stottlemeyer's right-hand man
- Julie Teeger, Natalie's daughter

=== Original characters ===
==== Present day ====
- Clarence Lenihan, a character in the prologue
- Manny Feikema, an ex-SFPD cop and security guard at Trouble's history museum
- Bob Gorman, an auto mechanic in Trouble and Manny's replacement
- Chief Harley Kelton, Chief of Trouble's police and an ex-cop from Boston
- Doris Thurlo, Trouble's historian
- Ralph DeRosso, conductor and brakeman of the Golden Rail Express
- Crystal DeRosso, Ralph DeRosso's daughter
- Jake Slocum, one of two robbers hired by DeRosso to carry out the Golden Rail Express
- George Gilman, Jake Slocum's partner
- Gator Dunsen, a recently released ex-convict arrested by Manny
- Detective Lydia Wilder of the Amador County police
- Clifford Adams, the Golden Rail Express's boilerman
- Edward "Ed" Randisi, the history museum's director
- Leonard McElroy, the Golden Rail Express's engineer

==== 19th century ====
- Artemis Monk, Monk's 19th century ancestor. He was Trouble's assayer and also helped the sheriff solve crimes that took place in the town. Artemis is responsible for the grid-style layout that comprises Trouble today.
- Abigail Guthrie, Artemis Monk's assistant and Natalie's analogue.
- Sheriff Wheeler, the Sheriff of Trouble, and Stottlemeyer's analogue. He wears a thick mustache.
- Deputy Parley Weaver, Sheriff Wheeler's right-hand man and Disher's analogue.
- Hank Guthrie, Abigail's gold-obsessed husband, and an analogue to Mitch Teeger.
