= Gar Anthony Haywood =

American author of crime fiction (born 1954)

- Born: 1954 (age 71–72); Los Angeles, California, U.S.
- Occupation: Author
- Writing career
- Genre: Crime fiction
- Notable awards: Shamus Award (1989)

Gar Anthony Haywood (born 1954) is an American author of crime fiction. He was born in Los Angeles in 1954, and worked as a computer technician for over a decade before he started publishing novels.

Fear of The Dark (1988) won the Shamus Award for best first private investigator novel. It also spawned a long-running series that featured the protagonist Aaron Gunner. The Aaron Gunner books are hardboiled detective fiction, inspired by Ross Macdonald's Los Angeles novels. Haywood has also written several standalone thrillers, as well as a pair of light, comic mysteries.

Haywood has also written numerous screenplays for television, including an episode of New York Undercover and the TV movie adaptation of Bad As I Wanna Be, the autobiography of basketball player Dennis Rodman.

== Aaron Gunner mystery novels ==
- Good Man Gone Bad (Prospect Park, 2019) is Heywood's seventh mystery novel, featuring Aaron Gunner, 60-year-old African-American private investigator.
