= List of Chesapeake Shores episodes =

Chesapeake Shores is a Canadian/American drama television series, based on the novel series of the same name by Sherryl Woods. The series had a two-hour premiere on the Hallmark Channel on August 14, 2016. The ensemble cast includes Meghan Ory, Jesse Metcalfe, Treat Williams, Laci J. Mailey, Emilie Ullerup, Brendan Penny, Andrew Francis, Barbara Niven and Diane Ladd.

A spinoff television film is also in production.

During the course of the series, 55 episodes of Chesapeake Shores aired over six seasons, concluding on October 16, 2022.

== Series overview ==
Season	Episodes	Originally released	
Season	Episodes	First released	Last released
1	9	August 14, 2016	October 9, 2016
2	10	August 6, 2017	October 8, 2017
3	10	August 5, 2018	October 7, 2018
4	6	August 25, 2019	September 29, 2019
5	10	August 15, 2021	October 17, 2021
6	10	August 14, 2022	October 16, 2022

== Episodes ==
=== Season 1 (2016) ===
No. overall	No. in season	Title	Directed by	Written by	Original release date	U.S. viewers (millions)
1	1	"Pilot"	Martin Wood	Nancey Silvers	August 14, 2016	1.94
Abby O'Brien, a career woman and divorced mother of two daughters lives in New York. Abby's sister Jess asks her and the girls to visit Chesapeake Shores, where Jess is renovating a rundown home into a bed and breakfast. Abby reconnects with her high school sweetheart, Trace. She extends her visit when Nell, the grandmother who raised her, suffers a minor illness. Abby contemplates her children growing up there. Trace reveals that he tried to find her in New York after college but stopped upon hearing of her engagement. Abby then visits her firm's Baltimore office, where she is extended a job offer. That night, Abby's father Mick surprises everyone with his decision to move his family to town.
2	2	"Home to Roost, Part One"	Peter DeLuise	John Tinker	August 21, 2016	1.86
Abby jogs by Trace's place, and they discuss last night and what it might mean. Soon after, Wes arrives to pick up the girls and gets into an argument with Abby. Trace won't open up about why he returned from Nashville, only saying that the music business isn't what he hoped. As Jess prepares for the opening of her B&B, Megan takes a room there and the two argue. A pipe bursts, and Mick rushes to the B&B to fix it before the opening. Kevin, an Army medic, announces he's being deployed again to Afghanistan. Wes hands papers to Abby, saying their current arrangement isn't going to work.
3	3	"Home to Roost, Part Two"	Peter DeLuise	John Tinker	August 28, 2016	2.18
Abby decides to accept the job offer in the Baltimore office and stay in Chesapeake Shores to raise her daughters. Trace continues to struggle with things he left behind in Nashville. Trace and Abby agree that, for now, they need to be friends and nothing more. Mick suggests to Bree that staying in Chesapeake Shores for a while may be just what she needs to overcome her writer's block.
4	4	"We're Not Losing a Son..."	Martin Wood	Nancey Silvers	September 4, 2016	2.21
Just as Abby and Trace are getting comfortable with their "friendship" agreement, Trace's beautiful singing partner Leigh arrives from Nashville. Leigh tries to convince Trace to return to Nashville and finish the album they were working on. Leigh checks into Jess's bed & breakfast, leaving Jess and Bree to wonder if the relationship between Trace and Leigh went beyond music. Megan visits with Connor and tries to mend old wounds, but Connor's resentment is apparent. Nell convinces Mick to stop meddling in Jess's business, so Mick takes on a new project – building a playhouse for Abby's girls. Mick gets a call from an Army representative, saying that Kevin's unit in Afghanistan is missing in action.
5	5	"We're Gaining a Daughter"	Martin Wood	Nancey Silvers	September 11, 2016	2.23
Mick receives news regarding his son Kevin, who has been missing in action. Trace tells his music partner, Leigh, he cannot return to Nashville to finish the album they started together. Mick and Abby travel to New York for her custody battle with her ex-husband Wes. The judge grants Abby temporary custody until an agreement can be made over the summer. Trace finds an abandoned warehouse for sale and dreams of turning it into a place for the townspeople to listen to music, with a studio upstairs. He agrees to finish the album, but he says when it's done, so will be his partnership with Leigh. Mick receives another phone call saying that Kevin is alive and will be transported to a hospital. Mick and Nell discuss his father, who died in 1999. Mick wishes his children had the same feelings for him as he had for his father.
6	6	"Georgia on My Mind"	Anne Wheeler	John Tinker	September 18, 2016	1.85
A woman named Georgia arrives at the house and says she is Kevin's fiancée. She has convinced the hospital to let Kevin recover at home. Abby is at work when an agent from the SEC shows up and asks what was in the boxes she transported home from New York. Connor is occupied taking the bar exam and starts to get romantic with his study partner. Bree tells Abby that while she was in Chicago, she found out her boyfriend Martin is seeing someone else. Trace's banker father tells him he has been rejected for a loan to buy the warehouse, saying there is nothing he can do to get around Trace's debts and lack of a steady job – also mentioning regular payments Trace is sending back to Nashville. Trace later finds out that Mick bought the building. Abby pores over the contents of her New York office, trying to figure out what spiked the SEC's interest.
7	7	"Second Chances"	Anne Wheeler	Kirsten Hansen	September 25, 2016	1.89
At her new book exchange booth, Bree meets a man named David, who flirts with her. She later tells Jess about it, and Jess prepares to see her new boyfriend. Trace talks about the warehouse with Mick, who likes his idea of making it a music venue and asks if they can be partners on the project. Wes visits Abby and asks about the SEC investigation. She learns it is related to a deal he and his fiancée Gabrielle were working on while Abby was still employed in New York. He says he and Gabrielle broke up, that he now has no job and is facing an investigation, and that the girls are all he has left. He and Abby agree to work out something, without lawyers, regarding the children. Megan confronts Mick, saying she is upset that the kids feel she just left them years ago. Abby visits Trace, and admits she was jealous seeing him with Leigh. Trace finally reveals that he was the driver in an auto accident that badly injured his bass player and is dealing with guilt. Bree meets Jess's boyfriend and sees it is David, leading to an awkward moment. Nell prepares for a trip to Ireland. Kevin rides into the woods with Connor and, despite Kevin's injury, they climb to an old tree house. Kevin talks about his convoy in Afghanistan hitting an IED, and he's obviously still shaken. When the two climb down from the tree, Kevin falls and cannot move.
8	8	"Deals Undone"	Martin Wood	Nancey Silvers	October 2, 2016	2.19
Kevin appears to have suffered no ill effects from his fall, but he and Connor are chastised by the family for doing something so careless. Trace learns that Mick pulled out of his deal to buy the warehouse and is declined a loan from his father's bank. Although his father later offers him a loan, Trace refuses. Mick then shows Trace a different property he owns that could make a great music venue. The two agree to a partnership. Abby is served with a summons by the Department of Justice, who want to seize all of the contents she has from her New York office. Connor, without consulting Abby or Wes, sets up a meeting with the DOJ rep. Connor convinces the rep that Gabrielle, Wes' ex-fiancée, is the real culprit and says Wes and Abby should be exonerated for their cooperation. Though his move is successful, Connor is scolded by Abby and Megan for taking such a risk. During a family fun day at a game center, David invites Bree to participate with him and Jess. Jess soon becomes angry as she is excluded from David and Bree's talks. Georgia prepares to leave town and reminds Kevin that they both agreed to start their new life in Daytona Beach. Trace invites Abby on a date.
9	9	"Exes Mark the Spot"	Martin Wood	Nancey Silvers	October 9, 2016	1.72
Jess tells David she wants to break up, as they have nothing in common. Almost immediately after, she says she needs a chef at the B&B and offers him the job. As Abby and Trace grow closer together, Wes tells Abby he will no longer fight for custody of their daughters. He also announces he'll be looking for a job in the area, and Abby promises to be generous with visitation. Kevin confides in Connor that he loves Georgia, but is not in love with the idea of marrying her. He announces he's going back to Johns Hopkins to become a doctor. At a family gathering, both Leigh and Bree's former flame Martin shows up unannounced. Bree argues with Martin, saying she waited for years for him to propose marriage, only to have him break her heart. Trace gets a phone call and learns his father has been hospitalized, so he leaves the party abruptly. On the way to the hospital, he is stopped for speeding, then arrested for an outstanding warrant. Back at the party, Martin announces the real reason he showed up: he offers Bree the position of Playwright in Residence at the Chicago theater where he is a director. Mick finally arrives at the party. With his five children surrounding him, he tells each how proud he is of them.

=== Season 2 (2017) ===
No. overall	No. in season	Title	Directed by	Written by	Original release date	U.S. viewers (millions)
10	1	"Secrets, Lies, and School Supplies"	Sean McNamara	Nancey Silvers	August 6, 2017	1.87
As the town prepares for the annual lantern festival, Trace must return to Nashville to face a mistake from his past. Meanwhile, Mick takes his granddaughters back-to-school shopping and covertly works on a business deal that is bound to cause family conflict. Jess is overwhelmed by both a busy weekend at her bed and breakfast and the news that her mother, Megan, has returned to town for good. Bree must decide if she will move to Chicago to produce her play. As the festival nears, Trace and the O'Briens try to put their challenges aside, so that four generations — including grandma Nell — can come together.
11	2	"Pasts and Presents"	Sean McNamara	Michael Berns	August 13, 2017	1.61
As Mick moves forward with his bold plans to develop the O'Brien Trust land, he tells Trace he has to sell the music club space. Trace's father returns home from his surgery and again offers Trace a loan to buy the property, but Trace decides to try a different tactic. Jess is working around the clock planning to host her second cousin's wedding at the B&B, forcing her to reluctantly accept help from Megan. Kevin has a possible PTSD episode in front of Megan, but later runs toward danger as he was trained, and saves a man's life with Abby's help. Connor interviews for his first job as a lawyer. Bree travels to Chicago and finds herself confronting Martin for making major changes to her play's script. As Trace and Leigh work on a song, she tries to convince him that he belongs back in Nashville.
12	3	"Photographs and Memories"	Terry Ingram	Michael MacLennan	August 20, 2017	1.84
As Abby sends her girls off to their first day at a new school, conflict arises between Trace and Wes about their roles in the family. This is complicated further when a Nashville recording label takes interest in Trace and Leigh's new demo. The O'Brien siblings reminisce over their own school days watching home movies shot by Megan, but these videos have Jess feeling left out and angry at her mother for leaving when she was young. Megan tries to help Jess market the B&B as the slow season approaches, but Jess is resistant. Connor learns his new place of employment values conformity over individualism. Nell helps Connor dress more professionally, but struggles to prevent Mick from butting heads with his brother Thomas (Gregory Harrison) over family land. Bree sees the bookstore in town is going out of business and takes it upon herself to save it, while Kevin learns that a cute firefighter named Sarah, whom he met at the accident scene, is interested in him. This causes a dilemma, as Kevin hasn't yet officially ended things with Georgia.
13	4	"It's Always Nashville"	Terry Ingram	Kirsten Hansen	August 27, 2017	1.70
Trace and Leigh learn that famous Nashville producer Mark Hall (Jerry Trimble) will be recording their new single. As they attempt to sing the song in the studio, Hall says he doesn't hear enough emotion in their voices. He orders them to different rooms and tells each to imagine someone special they would sing to. Thinking of Abby, Trace nails his take, but it leads to Hall thinking that Trace would be better off as a solo act, without Leigh. Jess tries to help out Bree's bookstore by promoting an appearance from Simon Atwater, a hot new author, but Bree learns her sister hasn't asked Simon yet. Kevin finally asks out Sarah on a date, saying he will explain why he didn't call her back after their last encounter. Abby says her client has agreed to work with Mick on developing the O'Brien Trust land, but Nell thinks it is more important for Mick to reconcile with Thomas.
14	5	"Buried Treasures"	Mike Rohl	Michael MacLennan	September 3, 2017	1.85
Nell discovers a treasure map that Bree made as a teenager, leading Bree and Kevin to hunt for a family time capsule in the backyard. Trace is in Nashville fighting Mark to keep Leigh on an upcoming album at the risk of his own career. Later, the Trace Riley Band, featuring Leigh, debuts at an industry event show, while an irritated Mark observes. Abby meets a handsome widower in the PTA, Douglas Peterson (Victor Webster). At her bed and breakfast, Jess must deal with a demanding customer, but David later discovers that the guest is a famous travel writer. Mick and Thomas continue to spar over the development deal, never seeing eye-to-eye about the past or the future. Megan reconnects with the family by giving Connor dating advice and tutoring her granddaughters.
15	6	"Grand Openings"	Mike Rohl	David Maples	September 10, 2017	1.80
As The Bridge nightclub's opening nears, Trace spends late nights practicing with Leigh and his band, while Mick fights city hall to obtain a live music permit. Abby receives a promotion at work, but it could leave her with less time to spend with the family and Trace. Frustrated with her own work prospects, Megan gets an endorsement from an unexpected ally. Jess begins to develop feelings for David, while also trying to get him to open up about himself. Bree is surprised at her bookstore by a new admirer, author Simon Atwater. Connor reconnects with former schoolmate Danielle (Britt Irvin), and Kevin focuses on Sarah. Sensing romance in the air, Nell hosts a dinner for her grandchildren and their new love interests. The Bridge opens with a good crowd on hand, but moments into the Trace Riley Band's first song, Abby gets a text from Wes saying their sick girls want their mommy. Trace sees her leave.
16	7	"All Our Yesterdays"	Anne Wheeler	Nancey Silvers	September 17, 2017	1.72
Mick receives damaging information about Thomas from Abby's client, and considers whether to use it in their town hall debate over the family land trust. Jess plans a special meal to win over David, but is fearful to take the next step in their relationship. Bree is also afraid to move forward with Simon, telling Megan that she always gets into relationships that are doomed. Connor and Kevin both contemplate their careers, concerned they may be headed down the wrong paths. Overloaded with work, both Trace and Abby try to find time to spend with each other and their families. On advice from Nell, Megan tells her children the real reason she left for New York all those years ago.
17	8	"Forest Through the Trees"	Anne Wheeler	Ann Hamilton	September 24, 2017	1.86
Trace takes Abby on a camping trip where they reconnect and he makes a vow that, no matter where their careers take them, he will always put Abby first. Jess fears falling in love with David because she always screws up things, while Bree is letting the pain of her past with Martin prevent her from getting involved with Simon. Both eventually share a romantic moment with their significant others. Sarah confides to Kevin that her late husband was a Marine who died on the battlefield three years ago, adding that she's not yet ready to start a new relationship. Connor helps Thomas with a legal project and becomes intrigued with the possibility of a career in environmental law. Mick decides to compromise on the O'Brien Trust land and finally sits down with Thomas to talk. Meanwhile, a video of the Trace Riley Band singing "Freefall" has gained over 400,000 views, causing Trace to realize he's likely heading back to Nashville.
18	9	"The Royal Court"	Andy Mikita	Nancey Silvers	October 1, 2017	1.92
After his band's music video goes viral, Trace receives offers from music executives, but he tries to convince his band to follow through on their plans to remain independent. After a conversation with Mick, Trace later wants to give an apologetic Mark Hall another chance. Abby, Nell, and Megan spend some family time together preparing a princess birthday party for Carrie. Kevin finds inspiration to follow his passion while visiting a fallen army friend's mother with Bree. Watching the shop in Bree's absence, Jess discovers that running a bookstore is not as easy as she thought. She makes a big error in a book order, but David secretly bails her out. Connor turns to Danielle when he finds his career direction shifting. After Mick refuses to use incriminating information against Thomas, he must find a new investor for his development deal.
19	10	"Freefall"	Andy Mikita	Ann Hamilton	October 8, 2017	1.63
After Mark Hall offers Trace and his band a worldwide tour deal, Trace and Abby worry about how it might impact their future together. David makes a confession to Jess. As Nell ponders a lost love from her past, Abby, Jess, and Bree are faced with the possibility of losing their new loves in the present and turn to each other for strength and support in sisterhood. Kevin reconnects with Sarah as they prepare for Megan's art fair, which has Kevin confused about the nature of their relationship. Mick explores a land development partnership with Douglas, while adjusting to news that Connor has been working for Thomas.

=== Season 3 (2018) ===
No. overall	No. in season	Title	Directed by	Written by	Original release date	U.S. viewers (millions)
20	1	"An Open Book"	Sean McNamara	Michael Berns	August 5, 2018	1.67
After three months on tour, Trace gets three weeks off and returns home to Abby. During a magazine interview, he realizes that protecting Abby and the girls from the paparazzi will be difficult. Mick faces off against Connor in an environmental legal battle over the land development deal, and tries to warn him of a major error before it is too late. Jess discovers Bree's manuscript, causing tensions to rise when she reads its contents. Meanwhile, Kevin continues paramedic training and grows closer to Sarah. As everyone gathers for the annual Oyster Festival, Nell recruits the family to save a local landmark.
21	2	"The Way We Were"	Sean McNamara	Nancey Silvers	August 12, 2018	1.41
While Trace ponders a big gig that would take him away from Abby, she questions whether to give him an unsent letter she wrote him years ago. Mick and Megan meet with Thomas, whose rekindled spark with his once-estranged wife prompts each of them to assess their own relationship. Simon returns to Bree's life, but the rift between her and Jess leaves her without a sounding board. Kevin is concerned upon seeing Connor's girlfriend with another man. Nell continues her fight to preserve the wishing fountain. Meanwhile, after several days of not hearing from David, Jess gets a letter from him inviting her to Maine.
22	3	"The Rock is Going to Roll"	Terry Ingram	Brian Ross	August 19, 2018	1.46
As Trace tries to spend time with Abby's daughters before embarking on the next leg of his tour, they question his role in their lives. Bree joins Jess on a visit to David and his parents, but Jess still harbors hurt feelings over Bree's manuscript. Jess needs Bree's support more than ever, though, when she discovers why David's parents want to meet her. Mick sees striking similarities between his troubled relationship with his brother and his sons' relationship with one another, as Kevin and Connor feud over Kevin's meddling in Connor's relationship. Meanwhile, Nell is increasingly persuasive trying to convince the mayor to keep the wishing fountain.
23	4	"Once Upon Ever After"	Terry Ingram	Michael Berns	August 26, 2018	1.63
Abby joins Trace on his tour, but she learns her family's privacy might be jeopardized by paparazzi. Mick and Megan help prepare for the vow renewal ceremony of Thomas and Robin, which also brings Connor and Kevin closer together after Nell assigns them a task. Meanwhile, Jess considers a life with David away from home, but Bree makes a troubling discovery about his mother that causes both sisters to question the Peck family's motives.
24	5	"Love Eventually"	Sean McNamara	Nancey Silvers	September 2, 2018	1.60
Abby is burdened by continued paparazzi attention from Trace's growing fame. As he works through his loneliness while on tour away from Abby, Trace writes a song for her, prompting an unexpected reaction from Leigh. Mick tries to repair his relationship with Connor at Megan's insistence, but their stormy history makes Connor reluctant to reconcile. Kevin is concerned when Sarah seeks adventure after a near-death accident at work, noticing similarities to his own behavior following his war injury. Bree edits her novel with Simon's help and realizes she and one of her characters both seek self-preservation that hinders their relationships. Meanwhile, Jess fears her relationship with David is over after she blew up at his parents.
25	6	"Here and There"	Sean McNamara	Brian Ross	September 9, 2018	1.44
Abby learns Wes is in a serious relationship and misses Trace's support when work obligations pull him away. Mick and Megan's relationship continues to evolve, but is influenced by their past. Having worked on her own for months, Jess adjusts to David's return. Bree attempts to define her relationship with Simon. Kevin enjoys a week of on-the-job fire training with Sarah, but is worried when he can't find any local offers for a full-time position. Meanwhile, Nell recruits Connor to investigate a contestant who breaks the rules in an annual gardening competition, but a surprising discovery causes her rethink her plan.
26	7	"It's Just Business"	Terry Ingram	Jill Goldsmith	September 16, 2018	1.49
Trace discovers The Bridge has fallen into debt due to an unscrupulous manager while he was on tour, and he tries to repair the damage. His discovery prompts Mick to reconsider the terms of their partnership and to put aside friendship and family when business is at stake. Abby tries to balance her stressful workload with being a "super mom" to keep up with Wes' new fiancée, Terri. Jess is suspicious when David's sister arrives in town looking for help with the family business. Bree asks Nell to read her manuscript, but realizes the real test will come when she gives it to Megan. When Kevin doesn't receive a job offer near Chesapeake Shores, Sarah considers relocating for a dream job close to her childhood home. Connor faces ex-girlfriend Danielle in court. Meanwhile, Megan turns serious when the mayor eliminates her job at the Arts Council.
27	8	"All Our Tomorrows"	Terry Ingram	Kirsten Hansen	September 23, 2018	1.67
Though initially hesitant to work with Terri, Abby helps her out tremendously and builds a new rapport with her while on a project. Trace, however, has a more difficult time at The Bridge, and considers putting his friendship with Mick in jeopardy during a professional disagreement. Kevin graduates from his EMT program, but the reality of he and Sarah moving apart looms over the happy occasion. When Danielle offers Connor a job, he senses familiar romantic feelings developing. At Nell's urging, Bree shares her manuscript with Megan and begins to realize there are two sides to every story. Mick also reads the manuscript and tells Bree she must not publish it. Meanwhile, Jess receives devastating news about the inn that she fears will impact her whole life, including her future with David.
28	9	"Forward to the Past"	Mike Rohl	Michael Berns & Kirsten Hansen	September 30, 2018	1.65
Abby is caught in the middle when Trace and Mick's legal conflict over The Bridge escalates. Their relationship is put to an even larger test, however, when Trace considers a tour offer that would take him away from Abby and the girls for the longest period yet. Despite Nell's efforts to keep the peace, the O'Briens are embattled over Bree's book, while Mick and Megan disagree over how their family history has been portrayed. Kevin drives Sarah to Philadelphia for her new job and seeing her with her family makes their pending separation even harder. Jess and David make the most out of an unexpected delivery while managing Sally's, and Bree gets an unexpected visitor from Simon's past. Meanwhile, Connor and Danielle consider rekindling their relationship.
29	10	"Before a Following Sea"	Mike Rohl	Michael Berns	October 7, 2018	1.66
Trace and Abby are immediately confronted with the fallout of his tour decision, with Abby ultimately seeking guidance from Nell. Mick prepares for the annual regatta with Connor and Thomas and uses his time on the water to contemplate his family over the last three years. In addition to book conflicts, Bree deals with an extended visit from the muse who inspired Simon's books. David's parents visit Jess to apologize and make an offer that could impact her future with David. Kevin and Sarah try to make their long-distance relationship work. After years of avoiding it, Mick and Megan are forced to examine their family history while confronting Bree about her book.

=== Season 4 (2019) ===
No. overall	No. in season	Title	Directed by	Written by	Original release date	U.S. viewers (millions)
30	1	"The End Is Where We Begin"	Terry Ingram	Michael Berns	August 25, 2019	1.81
Trace returns from his tour to an uncertain future with Abby. As they contemplate their relationship, she takes on fund manager Derrick Porter (David Lewis) as a client, and Trace takes notice of musical talent Emma, who is a bartender at The Bridge. Kevin plans a special outing with Sarah, as his siblings all discover his ulterior motive. Though happy with her own relationship with David, running his family's inn together does not meet Jess' expectations. Fresh off writing a national bestseller, Bree meets with potential producers for a new play. Meanwhile, Mick discovers one of his contractors has engaged in suspicious business practices, and Connor questions his own career path after he and Danielle reconnect with one of their old NYU Law friends.
31	2	"Leap of Faith"	Terry Ingram	Kirsten Hansen	September 1, 2019	1.77
Bree holds rehearsals for her new play and Simon shows up, realizing the male lead is based on himself. But Bree later discovers she also gave the character some of the best qualities of Martin, her old boyfriend. Ignoring Del's warnings, Abby reports Derrick Porter's company to protect investors, resulting in her being suspended without pay. Megan goes overboard making preparations for Sarah and Kevin's wedding, later realizing it's because she missed most of her children's milestones. On the job, Kevin treats his old high school football coach. After being told that the Inn at Eagle Point is beyond repair, Jess and David search for a new location to restart their dream. A visiting Donovan Wylie tries to convince Trace to return to his music career, but Trace is determined to stay home and run The Bridge. After winning a crucial settlement in his case, Connor is scolded by Thomas for taking an unnecessary risk and gets demoted to a research role. Mick learns that he is being accused of complicity in a lawsuit against his concrete contractor.
32	3	"A Sonnet for Caroline"	Andy Mikita	Nancey Silvers	September 8, 2019	1.68
As Abby faces both legal and professional ramifications, she tries to distract herself by volunteering at her daughters' school and meets an intriguing new man, Jay. Trace mentors Emma and encourages her to perform her music at The Bridge. Mick and Megan fear their renewed romantic feelings will complicate their friendship. Fortunately, Nell has returned as a confidante for Megan. Jess and David find themselves in a bidding war for a new bed-and-breakfast. Kevin discovers his family's good intentions have Sarah feeling overwhelmed. Bree contemplates her future with Simon, ultimately making a painful decision. While Connor tries to understand why Danielle has dark feelings about family, Danielle professes her love for him.
33	4	"Breaking Hearts and Playing Parts"	Andy Mikita	Michael Berns	September 15, 2019	1.70
Unknown to Abby, Caitlyn and Carrie suggest to Jay that he ask Trace to rebuild the scenery for their play, which was damaged by water. This creates an awkward situation when Abby sees both Jay and Trace at the school. As Trace realizes that Abby is moving on, he gets closer to Emma; but, when he learns that Emma withheld a certain detail about Mark Hall's record deal, Trace is angry. Kevin and Sarah show up at the O'Brien home announcing they have eloped, which disappoints Megan. Sarah later offers to have Megan plan a reception for them. Bree's dismal state over her breakup with Simon has her writing a new, darker ending to her play, but seeing David and Jess work out a compromise at their B&B gives her hope that finding true love is still possible. Connor ponders why he didn't reply to Danielle's "I love you" statement. He later says he loves her, but realizes they want very different things.
34	5	"All the Time in the World"	Terry Ingram	Michael Berns & Kirsten Hansen	September 22, 2019	1.54
Following her deposition, Abby thinks she may have committed "career suicide", but spending time with her girls and Jay eases the pain. Trace rebuilds his trust with Emma, but stops short of pursuing a relationship. He later offers to buy Mick's share of The Bridge. Jess and David are shocked when guests arrive at the B&B four days before their planned opening, but they rally to get through it. Kevin and Sarah realize that in getting married only three weeks after their engagement, they neglected to discuss some things. Nell offers advice to Mick and Megan as they progress through a rekindled relationship, while she also reassures a concerned Jess that both have learned a lot since the divorce. As her play is set to open, Bree has to write a paragraph about herself for the playbill and ponders who her "real" self is. Meanwhile, Connor takes a bold step toward a new career path.
35	6	"Watercolors, Wishes, and Weddings"	Terry Ingram	Michael Berns	September 29, 2019	1.69
Jess accidentally finds an engagement ring hidden by David, but legal issues surrounding the B&B opening have David delaying "the question". Mark Hall returns with a proposal for Trace to both stay in music and stay in Chesapeake Shores, but Trace still tells Emma she'd be better off going to Nashville. Jay and Abby go on a series of dates, but Jay can't help noticing that Abby is still hung up on Trace. Bree is targeted by an agent, ultimately signing with him just in time to learn that he wants to run her play in London. Connor impresses his potential new boss enough to get a job offer, but Thomas warns him that he'll be working for "sharks". Mick offers Abby a partnership in his construction business, but Abby later learns Derrick Porter has been indicted and Del has offered her old job back. After the O'Brien and Mercer families celebrate Kevin and Sarah's marriage, Abby takes a walk on the beach and sees Trace playing a new song. After a brief conversation, the two embrace and kiss.

=== Season 5 (2021) ===
No. overall	No. in season	Title	Directed by	Written by	Original release date	U.S. viewers (millions)
36	1	"A Kiss Is Still a Kiss"	Michael Robison	Phoef Sutton	August 15, 2021	1.45
The conversation that followed Trace and Abby kissing is slowly revealed, and it devolves into their breakup. Bree returns from her play's successful run in England. She is offered a job as playwright-in-residence at the University of Maryland, but learns she would be working with an old nemesis. Kevin and Sarah discuss trying to have a baby, which they haven't yet revealed to the rest of the family. Kevin later encounters an old high school acquaintance, Luke, working at a convenience store. Connor settles into his new job, and is assigned an attractive paralegal. Jess and David are at odds with David's parents over the kind of wedding they want. All of the O'Brien children are interested in how the renewed relationship between Mick and Megan is progressing. Mick continues to deal with fallout from the lawsuit brought against one of his subcontractors.
37	2	"Nice Work If You Can Get It"	Michael Robison	Nancey Silvers	August 22, 2021	1.26
More of the aftermath from Abby's and Trace's breakup is revealed. Trace decided to sell his share of The Bridge back to Mick, and leave town. Abby and her girls are comforted by Jay during a beach cleanup event, but Abby tells Jay she's not ready to start a new relationship. Bree interviews for her university job with her old high school nemesis, Jerry, and realizes she misread his animosity toward her those many years ago. Jess is conflicted about telling David that his mother wants her to sign a pre-nuptial agreement. Kevin offers Luke a job at The Bridge, but Luke rejects him. Luke later runs into Bree as she's dropping off clothing at a charity box. After Bree leaves, Luke takes a shirt and boots from the box. Mick and Abby start to lose some of their most loyal customers, due to Mick being dragged into the lawsuit against his concrete supplier.
38	3	"Are the Stars Out Tonight?"	Alysse Leite-Rogers	Mark Jordan Legan	August 29, 2021	1.45
Despite an issue with possible soil contamination, Abby tries to convince eccentric billionaire Evan Kincaid that the hotel property she and Mick are developing is worth his investment. At the same time, Abby gets Thomas to look at a Baltimore property for his new office, but Mick isn't sure he wants to do business with his brother now that they are getting along so well. Luke takes a job at The Bridge, but on his first day he confesses to Mick that he's spent time in prison. Bree settles into her new teaching job and working for Jerry. Connor impresses his boss in court, but later sees her taking in Dilfer, Mick's concrete supplier, as a client. Mick and Thomas make plans to visit the Appalachian trail and re-do the hike they once made as kids. Elsewhere, Megan learns a painting she bought in a local shop for $8 is the work of a once-famous artist who is now reclusive.
39	4	"Happy Trails"	Alysse Leite-Rogers	Gina Gold & Aurorae Khoo	September 5, 2021	1.48
Mick and Thomas bond during their Appalachian Trail hike, but also encounter trouble. Connor is taken aback when his boss and an executive at his firm won't respect his firewall regarding his father and client Dilfer. Later, while helping Abby locate a document, Connor finds evidence that Dilfer forged Mick's signature on some contracts. At the same time, Abby is dealing with numerous questions and demands from Evan Kincaid. Jess and David ramp up their wedding planning, while receiving numerous guests who are in town to participate in the annual hunt for a legendary creature. Megan tries again to connect with artist Arthur Driscoll, but is again shut down. At the fire station, Kevin sees evidence that his captain may be in the early stages of Alzheimer's disease. Luke is visited at The Bridge by his parole officer, who is angry that he didn't alert him about the new job.
40	5	"They Can't Take That Away From Me"	Terry Ingram	Nancey Silvers	September 12, 2021	1.50
As Jess and David make the final plans for their wedding, Jess confides that she's not sure she wants children, thinking she'd be a bad parent because she grew up mostly without a mother. At the same time, Sarah finds out she has a medical condition that could make it difficult for her to get pregnant. Kevin tries to keep his captain's secret, but when the captain almost harms an allergic patient in the field by giving the wrong dose of a medication, he decides he has to resign. As Mick is being deposed by Connor's superiors, Connor shows up with evidence of both Dilfer's forgery and his superiors breaking into his desk. Connor then resigns. Just hours after Bree agrees to a working date with Jerry, she is asked by Luke for her phone number and she obliges. Megan finally breaks down some of Driscoll's barriers, with help from Nell. Abby learns that some historical artifacts were unearthed during excavation on the hotel property, and she shares this news with Evan.
41	6	"Love Is Here to Stay"	Terry Ingram	Brian L. Ross	September 19, 2021	1.56
A representative from the Smithsonian visits Abby, stating that they found remnants of a British supply ship from the 1600s on the hotel site and insisting they need to halt construction for at least six months. Bree has a working date with Jerry, after which she invites him to be her plus-one for Jess and David's wedding, unaware that Kevin also invited Luke to the wedding. Abby invites Jay to be her plus-one. Nell sends a treat basket to Driscoll, plus birthday cards from Carrie and Caitlyn. When Driscoll sees on Caitlyn's card that she has a talent for drawing, he pays both girls a visit. Connor makes plans to go into private practice, including leasing an old pet store in town with intentions of turning it into his office. Bree officiates Jess and David's wedding, which goes off without a hitch. At the reception, Bree dances with Jerry before he has to leave. She later dances with Luke, which Jerry witnesses when he comes back for his phone. Meanwhile, Abby dances with both Jay and Evan. While dancing with Evan, he reveals he will be pulling out of the hotel project due to the delay.
42	7	"What's New?"	Siobhan Devine	Phoef Sutton	September 26, 2021	1.48
Evan visits the O'Brien house to dissolve the hotel agreement, but throws out his back and spends the next few days on their couch. Driscoll mentors Caitlyn as she paints, leading Carrie to wonder what her own special talent is. Both Jay and Evan help her discover it. Driscoll later goes on a date with Nell, who inspires him to do a sketch for the first time in decades. While helping Connor clean his new office space, Luke confides that he hasn't told Bree about his prison time, and also asks for Connor's legal advice. Bree decides she wants to date Luke, later telling Jerry she isn't interested in anything romantic. Jess worries about an old habit recurring in front of David, especially after Abby remembers that it's usually a sign of Jess being anxious. Sarah weighs a new promotion opportunity at the fire station with how it might affect her and Kevin trying to have a baby. She later has a dizzy spell and falls off a ladder, and while in the hospital learns she is pregnant. Fully recovered, Evan decides to continue with the hotel project, building it next to a museum for the unearthed ship, while also telling Abby it's obvious that Jay is in love with her.
43	8	"Where or When?"	Siobhan Devine	Mark Jordan Legan	October 3, 2021	1.44
Evan flies Abby by chopper to his Pennsylvania estate, where he offers her a lucrative job working for The Kincaid Group. Abby declines. Luke confides in Connor that he plans to tell Bree about his prison time that evening, but unknown to him, Jerry has just told Bree. Kevin and Sarah decide to wait to tell their families about her pregnancy. Jess and David deal with a particularly harsh Yelp review, with Jess suspecting foul play by a competitor. Megan meets up with an old colleague as they try to resolve legal issues surrounding Arthur Driscoll's paintings, and later admits to Mick that she and the colleague had a brief romantic relationship during her 17 years away from the family. Mick is asked to spread a now-deceased friend's ashes over Chesapeake Bay. He does so from his private plane, but the family worries when night falls and he hasn't returned.
44	9	"What a Difference a Day Makes"	Terry Ingram	Phoef Sutton	October 10, 2021	1.40
After hours of worrying, the O'Brien's learn that Mick had to crash-land his plane and was rescued by the Coast Guard. He is in the hospital with some injuries, but will survive. Connor hires Margaret, the paralegal from his former firm, who reveals she quit over the way the company treated him. Connor learns that Luke's parole officer requires him to attend a hearing because he tested positive for amphetamines. Luke swears he didn't intentionally take any drugs, and Connor takes the case, only to collapse before the hearing. He is told he had a near heart attack brought on by stress, diet and fatigue. Elsewhere, Megan hosts a successful show for Driscoll's art, and David learns his father may be facing financial ruin. Evan asks for Mick's blessing to ask Abby on a date, while Mick tells Megan he wants to back away from work for a while and take her on a romantic trip. As the episode closes, Sarah collapses to the floor in front of Kevin.
45	10	"That Old Feeling"	Terry Ingram	Phoef Sutton	October 17, 2021	1.61
It's revealed that Sarah miscarried, sending her into a depression. Kevin seeks solace from Mick and Megan, despite Sarah not wanting to tell anyone. Mick announces to the family that he's taking a year off work to travel the world with Megan, but Megan soon receives a dream job offer in Los Angeles that threatens the trip and possibly her relationship with Mick. Abby is forced to decide between Evan and Jay, when Evan asks her on a date just as Jay finally reveals his feelings for her. Connor's relationship with Margaret becomes romantic, while he also gets help from a medical expert to exonerate Luke. David is forced to travel home when he sees his trust fund was wiped out, and learns his father has fled the country in the face of federal wire fraud and embezzlement charges. Bree overhears Abby leaving a message with either Evan or Jay saying, "let's give it a try." Just as Abby is about to reveal whom she called, Connor collapses in the driveway of the O'Brien home, apparently having a heart attack.

=== Season 6 (2022) ===
No. overall	No. in season	Title	Directed by	Written by	Original release date	U.S. viewers (millions)
46	1	"The Best Is Yet to Come"	Siobhan Devine	Phoef Sutton	August 14, 2022	1.471
The O'Briens and Margaret gather at the hospital after learning Connor had a heart attack. Jess is initially not there, as she is comforting David following the fallout of his father fleeing. Connor is put on bed rest and told not to work for 30 days. It's revealed that Abby called Evan to talk about "giving it a try". Megan puts any thoughts of her California job on hold, saying she needs to be with Connor as he recovers. Mick sees Bree and Luke having coffee, and later warns Luke he'd better not do anything to hurt his daughter, but he later offers Luke the job of managing The Bridge. Mick is also shown overusing the pain medication for the broken arm he suffered in the plane crash. Margaret brings Connor some paperwork to sign. Connor muses over closing the office, but Margaret says she can keep things running while he's out. Abby gets invited to Evan's yacht for a first date. The date ends just short of a kiss, as the two agree to take things slow.
47	2	"Memories Are Made of This"	Siobhan Devine	Mark Jordan Legan	August 21, 2022	1.387
While getting extra attention from Megan, Connor helps Margaret study for her bar exam. David's mother and sister make a surprise visit to the B & B. His mother says the family is financially ruined and that she has no idea where her husband went. Jess scolds the press members that have gathered outside, and calls the police to keep the press off the property. Bree has Luke review a short story written from a prisoner's perspective. Luke says it's good, but not very authentic. Mick later has a garbled conversation with Luke at The Bridge, and gets angry when Luke asks if he's still taking pain meds. Abby takes Evan on a crabbing trip for their second date. Connor calls his sisters together for a dinner to express his concerns about Megan passing on the California job. He says he does not want to be the reason she misses out on the opportunity of a lifetime. Megan joins the group later and the family convinces her to take the job.
48	3	"Night and Day"	Terry Ingram	Phoef Sutton	August 28, 2022	1.366
Evan and Abby partner up for a team-building scavenger hunt that Evan organized for his employees. Abby later learns why Evan is so afraid to drive at night. Connor is feeling bottled up in his parents' house, and asks Margaret to help him "escape" back to his own apartment. Margaret later professes her love for Connor, and Connor replies in kind. Megan and Mick agree to have a conversation about the 20 years they were apart before Megan departs for California. While some old, bad memories surface, the two later decide to leave the past in the past. Mick is shown continuing to take pain pills. Luke's apartment is flooded from a plumbing issue, and Bree agrees to put him up for a few nights. Overnight, Bree hears Luke scream while having a nightmare, and tries to comfort him. When Luke says he's embarrassed and wants to sleep in his truck, Bree takes his hand tells him that he isn't alone anymore. After completing the scavenger hunt, Abby and Evan celebrate with their first kiss.
49	4	"That's All There Is to That"	Terry Ingram	Mark Jordan Legan	September 4, 2022	1.355
Mick is shown "doctor shopping" in an effort to continue getting his opioid prescriptions filled. He later misses an appointment to pick up Carrie and Caitlyn and Abby finds him asleep at his desk. Connor and Margaret go over bills at the office and, despite realizing that money is tight, they decide they need to hire a receptionist. Luke's apartment situation goes from bad to worse, as he's just found out the building has black mold. His search for a new place is a struggle, as landlords refuse to take in an ex-convict. Bree extends the offer for Luke to stay on her couch. Sarah learns she is pregnant, and struggles with the decision to tell Kevin right away. Thomas is looking for blueprints in Mick's truck when he finds two prescription bottles from different doctors. He informs Megan, Kevin, Abby and Bree. After denying he has a problem, Mick later sideswipes a parked car and has to call Kevin for help. The family holds an intervention, which only angers Mick more. But he later asks Luke about his previous experience in AA, the first sign that he may be admitting to a problem.
50	5	"L-O-V-E"	Terry Ingram	Phoef Sutton	September 11, 2022	1.35
Mick calls Megan, saying that he can't sleep and withdrawal is tough. Later at an NA meeting, he refuses to get up and admit he's an addict. The Seaside Festival is in town, and Bree and Luke get fortunes from a Mr. Mystic machine that Luke fixed up. Both of their fortunes read "The love of your life is right before your eyes," causing Bree to believe that Luke set it up. She openly blames Luke for pushing their new relationship too far, but he says he just forgot to shuffle the machine's cards. It's only when Bree hears that Abby, Evan and Kevin all got the same fortune that she realizes Luke was telling the truth. She tries to apologize, but Luke walks away, saying he has trouble with people that won't trust him. Abby and Evan use the fortune cards as an opportunity to define their relationship. Connor meets Margaret's family. Mick is about to take a pill from a bottle he had stashed, when Megan calls. Mick throws the pill down the drain. Overhearing Megan's conversation, her boss and former fling Carter questions her about staying with an addict, angering Megan. Mick goes to another meeting, this time sharing with the group that he is an addict.
51	6	"Straighten Up and Fly Right"	Terry Ingram	Erinne Dobson	September 18, 2022	1.319
Mick has a relapse, taking a pill from Connor's medicine cabinet. At his next meeting he finally accepts that he needs a sponsor. Margaret passes the bar and interviews for what seems like a dream job. She returns and tells Connor that while the money is better, she left a big firm before for a reason. She proposes that Connor make her a full partner in the business, and Connor accepts. Bree tries to reconcile with Luke, saying her failed past relationships may be the cause of her trust issues. David's father calls to say he's okay, then claims that he's innocent and was set up. Authorities tap David's phone for the next call, but his father professes innocence again and says he wants to turn himself in. Kevin and Sarah decide to tell the family that Sarah is pregnant. An incident at school has Abby wondering if Caitlyn is hiding something. Bree shares news with the family that an agent called wanting to make her book about them into a movie.
52	7	"It's Not for Me to Say"	Stacey Nadine Harding	Elena Song	September 25, 2022	1.452
Six months after the previous episode, Sarah is now several months pregnant and Kevin accidentally peeks at her ultrasound image. Now knowing they are having a son, he struggles with telling Sarah, as they had planned to be surprised. David's father is back home and in jail awaiting trial. David visits him and initially uses the opportunity to lash out at what a bad father he was. His dad tells him to retrieve a USB drive from his D.C. home that will prove his innocence, surprising David when he says the password is the license plate number from a bicycle that David cherished as a child. Jess is trying to get a loan for a vineyard to tie to the B & B, but learns she must obtain it on the O'Brien name only with the Peck name tainted. Bree and Luke learn they have the same birthday, which is only a few days away. They insist on not getting each other gifts, but ultimately can't help themselves. Megan has been back from California for some time, and Mick wants her to move back into the O'Brien home. After his initial "practical" approach has Megan saying no, he tries a more romantic approach and it works. Abby casually tells Evan, "you must really love me," after his nice gesture. Evan leaves without saying anything, leaving Abby to consult Kevin on how to approach the "L" word the next time she sees Evan.
53	8	"I Get a Kick Out of You"	Stacey Nadine Harding	Ciara Van Gheem	October 2, 2022	1.453
Evan's genealogy results come back and he discovers a number of cousins in his paternal lineage, prompting Abby to suggest he search for his real father. Evan resists at first, but soon sends Mandrake to investigate. David believes his father is telling the truth about being framed, but learns his father will likely lose his legal battle without a good attorney. After the tainted Peck name has several lawyers refusing to take the case, David asks Connor and Margaret, who have just renamed their firm Keller & O'Brien. Bree meets with an actress about making her book into a movie, but she is worried about someone from Hollywood losing the book's meaning in the pursuit of entertainment. After a conversation with Sarah's maternity doctor, Kevin decides he wants to go back to medical school. Megan and Mick continue to rekindle their love. The episode closes with Mandrake introducing Evan to his father.
54	9	"Spring Can Really Hang You up the Most"	Siobhan Devine	Phoef Sutton	October 9, 2022	1.595
Mandrake brings Evan’s father, John Osterberg, to Mick O’Brien’s home, where John meets Abby and Evan. Evan is cold toward his father as John reveals that he did not know he had a son. Evan leaves, and John tells Abby that he will stay in town for a few days. Bree tells the actress Miranda, who is staying at the B & B, that she will only agree to a movie based on her book if Bree can write the screenplay, and the actress agrees. Later, Miranda tells Bree that she has taken a part in a Marvel movie, putting Bree’s movie on hold. Jess runs into Caitlyn downtown; Caitlyn has dyed her hair blue and is crying. Jess drives her back to school, and shortly thereafter, Abby gets a phone call from the school. Caitlyn started a physical fight with classmate Sloan Russell, and both girls are suspended for the rest of the week. Evan does not take Abby’s calls, and he fires Mandrake, who tells Abby how he met Evan; Mandrake reveals that his real name is Alan Wilkins. Luke prevents a robbery at a convenience store but is shot. Mick proposes to Megan, and she accepts. Miranda helps Jess acquire a vineyard. Sarah goes into labor.
55	10	"All or Nothing at All"	Siobhan Devine	Story by : Phoef Sutton & Mark Jordan Legan; Teleplay by : Phoef Sutton	October 16, 2022	1.909
While Nell is in Ireland, the O’Brien clan celebrates multiple milestones. Kevin and Sarah have their baby, a boy they name after Mick. Mick tells Abby that he is retiring; she will head his company O’Brien Construction and Development Group. Mick and Megan marry, and after the ceremony, Abby announces that she and Evan are engaged, and Jess announces that she is pregnant. Abby offers Mandrake a job; Luke and Bree cement their relationship; Evan and his father, John, reconcile; and Connor and Margaret realize that they can win the case for David’s father.

== Ratings ==
Chesapeake Shores : U.S. viewers per episode (millions)

Season	Episode number										Average
Season	1	2	3	4	5	6	7	8	9	10	Average
1	1.94	1.86	2.18	2.21	2.23	1.85	1.89	2.19	1.72	–	2.00
2	1.87	1.61	1.84	1.70	1.85	1.80	1.72	1.86	1.92	1.63	1.78
3	1.67	1.41	1.46	1.63	1.60	1.44	1.49	1.67	1.65	1.66	1.57
4	1.81	1.77	1.68	1.70	1.54	1.69	–				1.70
5	1.45	1.26	1.45	1.48	1.50	1.56	1.48	1.44	1.40	1.61	1.46
6	1.471	1.387	1.366	1.355	1.35	1.319	1.452	1.453	1.595	1.909	1.465

Audience measurement performed by Nielsen Media Research
