= Panic in the Sky =

Panic in the Sky may refer to:

- "Panic in the Sky", a 1992 DC Comics storyline involving the character Brainiac
- "Panic in the Sky", a 1953 episode of the television series Adventures of Superman; see List of Adventures of Superman episodes § ep38
- "Panic in the Sky", a 2005 episode of the animated series Justice League Unlimited; see List of Justice League Unlimited episodes § ep24

== See also ==
- Panic in the Skies!, a 1996 disaster film
