= Britt Irvin =

Canadian actress

- Born: Brittney Elizabeth Irvin; Vancouver, British Columbia, Canada
- Occupation: Actress
- Years active: 1996–present
- Children: 1

Brittney Elizabeth Irvin is a Canadian actress who has also done voiceover work for Ocean Productions. Irvin is best known for playing Katie in Scary Godmother: Halloween Spooktakular and its sequel Scary Godmother: The Revenge of Jimmy. She was first billed as Britt Irvin in a 2001 episode of The Outer Limits, and is still sometimes billed as Brittney Irvin in recent work, such as her voice work as Jade in Bratz, and in two of the three episodes of Aliens in America in which she appeared in 2007. She also voiced Sunny Flare in My Little Pony: Equestria Girls.

== Early life ==
Britt Irvin was born Brittney Elizabeth Irvin in Vancouver, British Columbia, Canada, and raised in Surrey, British Columbia. She began dancing ballet and singing in festivals starting around 1990 when she was 6 years old. She worked on two musicals at age 10, Show Boat and A Christmas Carol, did voice work in the television series Nilus the Sandman, and worked in several television commercials between productions, many of which aired in the United States and Canada.

== Acting career ==
In 1996, Irvin appeared in the films Panic in the Skies! and The Angel of Pennsylvania Avenue. In 1998, she appeared in the TV series Little Men on Canada's CTV network, which lasted two seasons. Between 1998 and 2000, Irvin also played guest roles on Sleepwalkers, Night Man, Stargate SG-1, and The Outer Limits. In 2000, she played Laurel Everett in the television film Angels in the Infield which also starred Patrick Warburton and David Alan Grier. Also in 2000, she played the role of Maxine Bronty in Quarantine.

In 2000, Irvin acted in So Weird. In 2002, Irvin played a red-wine-loving kleptomaniac named Amy in the MTV film Wasted and played a role in The Outer Limits again in 2003, the same year she appeared in National Lampoon's Thanksgiving Family Reunion with Judge Reinhold and Penelope Ann Miller. Also, in 2003, she portrayed the late Dana Plato in the NBC television film Diff'rent Strokes: The Unauthorized Biography.

She played the single teenage mother Paige Leckie in the fourth season of Edgemont in 2004, but left the series after just one season in order to fulfill other commitments. Also in 2004 she played "Maggie" in the movie Jack.

Her works have included the 2005 film Reefer Madness which is based on the 2003 musical, (though she only appeared in one scene), the 2005 television film Absolute Zero with Jeff Fahey and Erika Eleniak, the 2007 film Hot Rod starring Andy Samberg, and playing the love interest of Kevin Zegers' character in Normal, which was also released in 2007.

She is named in the special thanks credits of Louis Belanger's 2009 film The Timekeeper, which premiered in Canada at the Vancouver International Film Festival and in the United States at the Brooklyn International Film Festival. She had appeared in a scene as a character named Nicole Granger, that was ultimately cut from the film.

Irvin is also an accomplished singer and voice-over artist. Her voice-over credits include TV series: Sabrina The Teenage Witch, Madeline, Bratz and in the English-language version of Inuyasha). She was also the voice of X-23 in the episode "Target X" fourth season of X-Men: Evolution (substituting Andrea Libman, who voiced the character in her original appearance). The character later crossed over to the X-Men comic titles. She once headlined her own limited series and is featured in the Avengers Academy title.

She was nominated for a Leo Award in 2008 for her performance in Normal.

Irvin also provided the voice of the character Ursula in the 2007 George of the Jungle cartoon series which aired on the Cartoon Network, making her the first (and currently only) person ever to voice a cartoon character in a series remake, where the character had originally been voiced by June Foray in the original. Foray had originally voiced the character Ursula in the original George of the Jungle series from the 1960s – though the character is significantly different in the 2007 series than in the 1967 series. The series aired for only one season.

Her work in 2008 included the voice of Polly, the love interest of Drake Bell's Harold Kelp in the direct-to-DVD animated sequel, The Nutty Professor.

She portrayed the character Amy in the television film Spectacular!, one of the first times she has ever played an antagonist, which aired on Nickelodeon on February 16, 2009. The series The Assistants, in which she plays the lead role Gillian Hughes, premiered on The N on July 10, 2009.

She appeared in the first three episodes of ABC's remake of the 1980s science fiction miniseries V, which premiered on ABC on November 3, 2009, as well as the first episode of Life UneXpected, which premiered in February 2010 on The CW. Irvin portrayed Stargirl in the Smallville episodes "Absolute Justice", "Salvation", "Icarus" and "Prophecy". Irvin appeared as Kathy Patton in Freshman Father, a Hallmark Channel movie where she portrays a prom queen turned young mother suffering from severe post-partum depression. In 2010, she appeared in Barbie: A Fashion Fairy Tale and Barbie: A Fairy Secret as the voice of Raquelle.

In 2012, Irvin co-starred in Michael Sucsy's film The Vow, which starred Rachel McAdams and Channing Tatum, and also included her former Little Men and Angels in the Infield co-star Rachel Skarsten in the cast.

In 2015, she voiced Sunny Flare in My Little Pony: Equestria Girls – Friendship Games and 2017 Equestria Girls special, Dance Magic.

== Music ==
Irvin released a demo music album in 2003. She has been known to give live performances in Vancouver and Los Angeles. Her music has never been mass-released, but some of the tracks have been found at sites like YouTube.

== Filmography ==
=== Film ===
Year	Title	Role	Notes
1999	Madeline: Lost in Paris	Chloe	Voice role
2002	Madeline: My Fair Madeline	Danielle	Voice role
2003	The Great Upstanding Member	Bonnie	Short film
2004	Dragons: Fire and Ice	Young Kyra	Voice role
2005	Reefer Madness: The Movie Musical	The Arc-ettes	
2005	The Road That Binds Us	Anne	Short film
2007	Hot Rod	Cathy	
2007	Normal	Melissa	
2007	Bratz: Super Babyz	Jade	Voice role
2008	Bratz: Girlz Really Rock	Jade	Voice role
2008	Bratz Babyz Save Christmas	Jade	Voice role
2008	The Nutty Professor	Polly McGregor	Voice role
2010	Bratz: Pampered Petz	Jade	Voice role
2010	Barbie: A Fashion Fairytale	Raquelle	Voice role
2011	Barbie: A Fairy Secret	Raquelle	Voice role
2012	Bratz: Desert Jewelz	Jade	Voice role
2012	The Vow	Lina	Voice role
2012	Barbie in A Mermaid Tale 2	Ambassador Mirabella	Voice role
2013	Lucille's Ball	Lucille	Voice role
2014	Feed the Gods	Emma	Voice role
2014	Barbie and the Secret Door	Jenna	Voice role
2015	Barbie in Princess Power	Corinne (Dark Sparkle)	Voice role
2016	Barbie: Spy Squad	Mila	Voice role
2017	The Wrong Babysitter	Kendra	

=== Television ===
Year	Title	Role	Notes
1995	The New Adventures of Madeline	Nicole	Voice role
1996	Panic in the Skies!	Joany Baker	
1996	Nilus the Sandman	Amy	Episode: "About Face"
1996	The Angel of Pennsylvania Avenue	Lilly Feagan	
1997	The Outer Limits	Katrine Houghton	Episode: "New Lease"
1998	Sleepwalkers	Young Gail	Episode: "Passed Imperfect"
1998	Night Man	Elizabeth	Episode: "Fear City"
1999	You, Me, and the Kids	Emily's adoptive cousin	Episode: "Adoption"
1999	Stargate SG-1	Merrin	Episode: "Learning Curve"
1999	Little Men	Anthea Harding / Nan	26 episodes
2000	Angels in the Infield	Laurel Everett	Television film
2000	The Wednesday Woman	Mimi Davidson	Television film
2000	Higher Ground	Jessica Merrick	2 episodes
2000	Quarantine	Maxine Bronty	Television film
2000	Personally Yours	Bridget Stanton	Television film
2000	So Weird	Jennifer Weider	Episode: "Rewind"
2000	InuYasha	Koharu	Voice role
2001	Beyond Belief: Fact or Fiction	Shay	Episode: "The Witness"
2001	Earth Maiden Arjuna	Cindy Klein	Voice role
2001	2gether: The Series	Jill Linus	Episode: "Jillie"
2001	The SoulTaker	Runa Tokisaka	Voice role
2001	The Outer Limits	Judith Wilder	Episode: "Mindreacher"
2002	Wasted	Amy	Television film
2002	Taken	Nina Toth	Episode: "Charlie and Lisa"
2003	Scary Godmother: Halloween Spooktakular	Katie	Voice role; Television film
2003	X-Men: Evolution	X-23	Episode: "Target X"
2003	Thanksgiving Family Reunion	Twig Snider	Television film
2003	Edgemont	Paige Leckie	13 episodes
2003	Family Curse	Miranda Walker	Television film
2004	Jack	Maggie	Television film
2004	The Book of Ruth	Daisy	Television film
2004	The Days	Zanni Colter	4 episodes
2004	ToddWorld	Trina/Sheep #1	
2005	Scary Godmother: The Revenge of Jimmy	Katie	Television film
2005	Being Ian	Andrea	Episode: "Bad Day at White Rock"
2005	Bratz	Jade	Voice role
2006	Absolute Zero	AJ Carmichael	Television film
2006	Alice, I Think	Jane	2 episodes
2006	Behind the Camera: The Unauthorized Story of 'Diff'rent Strokes'	Dana Plato	Television film
2006	Supernatural	First Teenage Girl	Episode: "Hell House"
2007	Write and Wrong	Stacy Herskowitz	Television film
2007–2008	George of the Jungle	Ursula	Main voice role
2007–2008	Aliens in America	Becky	4 episodes
2009	Spectacular!	Amy	Television film
2009	The Assistants	Gillian Hughes	Main role
2009	V	Haley Starks	3 episodes
2010	Life Unexpected	Tracy	Episode: "Pilot"
2010	Freshman Father	Kathy Patton	Television film
2010	R.L. Stine's The Haunting Hour	Temporary guardian	Episodes "Really You: Part 1" and "Really You: Part 2"
2010–2011	Smallville	Courtney Whitmore / Stargirl	4 episodes
2012	Beauty and the Beast	Lila	Episode: "Pilot"
2012	Smart Cookies	Paige	Television film
2012–2018	My Little Pony: Friendship is Magic	Lightning Dust	Voice role; episodes: "Wonderbolts Academy", "The Washouts"
2013	The Nearlyweds	Stella	Television film
2013	The Trainer	Tina Wallace	Television film
2013	Garage Sale Mystery	Celeste	Television film
2013	Supernatural	Muriel	Episode: "Holy Terror"
2013–14	Packages from Planet X	Amanda	Main role
2014	Mr. Miracle	Addie Folsom	Television film
2015	My Little Pony: Equestria Girls – Friendship Games	Sunny Flare	Voice role; television film
2015	IZombie	Kaley Taylor	Episode: "Dead Air"
2016–2018	Chesapeake Shores	Danielle Clayman	22 episodes
2017	My Little Pony: Equestria Girls – Magical Movie Night	Sunny Flare	Voice role; episode: "Dance Magic"
2017	World Trigger	Akane Hiura, Hikari Nire, Madoka Ui	Voice role
2017	Gintama	Haji	Voice role
2018	Reap What You Sew: An Aurora Teagarden Mystery	Cara Embler	Television film
2021	Cupids on Beacon Street	Eve	Television film
2022	Under the Banner of Heaven	Sarah Lafferty	6 episodes
2024	Family Law	Michelle Fischer	Episode: "A River in Egypt"

=== Music videos ===
- FRANKIIE: "Dream Reader" (2019)
