= Whistler (TV series) =

Teen drama television series, 2006–2008

- Whistler season one intertitle
- Created by: Kelly Senecal
- Directed by: Grant Harvey
- Starring: Jesse Moss; Amanda Crew; Adam J. Harrington; Holly Dignard; Ingrid Kavelaars; Christopher Shyer; Nick Lea (season 1); David Paetkau (season 1); Brendan Penny (season 1)
- Opening theme: "Ordinary Day" by The Dirtmitts
- Countries of origin: Canada; United States
- No. of seasons: 2
- No. of episodes: 26

Production
- Running time: 60 minutes (including commercials)
- Production companies: BoardWatch Productions; Blueprint Entertainment (Note: As Uphill Productions Inc. for season 1 and Uphill Productions 2 Inc. for season 2.); Fireworks Entertainment

Original release
- Network: CTV (Canada); The N (U.S.)
- Release: June 25, 2006 – April 19, 2008

Whistler is a teen drama series created by Kelly Senecal. It aired on CTV in Canada and on Noggin's teen-oriented programming block, The N, in the United States. It was the first hour-long drama and TV-14 rated program on The N.

The series centres on the aftermath of the mysterious death of a local snowboard legend in Whistler, British Columbia. It aired for two seasons from 2006 to 2008. Post-production was done in Vancouver. The show also aired in several international countries.

== Premise ==
The show begins when Beck McKaye (David Paetkau of Final Destination 2 and Flashpoint) returns home from the 2006 Winter Olympics with a gold medal. Upon his death, the show explores the lives of his friends and family—all of whom have stories to tell and secrets to keep.

The secret-keeping locals are the only ones who can answer the terrifying truth of the show's tagline, "What secrets lie beneath the snow?" McKaye's friends and family each have their own stories, as well as secrets they attempt to hide as the show progresses. In particular, Beck's brother Quinn (Moss) must try to solve the mystery of Beck's death.

Following the solution of Beck's death at the end of the first season, the series' second season shifts the focus to the lives and adventures of both returning and new characters. The McKayes, Varlands and Millers have put the pieces of their lives together and are ready to make a new start. Quinn steps out from his brother's shadow to carve out a name for himself on the mountain, while his mother comes to terms with her past and earns a future for herself. The Varlands fight to overcome their dark history and regain control of Whistler, while the Millers make new discoveries that may upset the balance of power. The show's second season tagline is "What new secrets lie hidden beneath the snow? The truth is hard to find. In Whistler it's just about impossible."

== Production ==
For season one, some of the outdoor shots used in the series were filmed in and around Whistler, but most of the outdoor (and all of the indoor) scenes were filmed at Uphill Studios in Langley, B.C., about 45 km (27 mi) southeast of Vancouver. For season two, significantly more of the outdoor filming was done in Whistler. All of the post-production was done in Vancouver by Rainmaker Post, formerly a division of Rainmaker Entertainment and now a division of Deluxe Entertainment Services.

On August 1, 2006, a lawsuit was filed against CTV by Olympic snowboarder Ross Rebagliati, accusing the network of "misappropriating" his identity with Whistler's main character Beck McKaye. The suit was settled out-of-court on April 24, 2008.

== Television air dates ==
Whistler premiered on CTV on June 25, 2006, and on The N in the United States on June 30, 2006.

The show aired in Canada on Sunday nights at 10 pm local time until August 14 when CTV announced it was moving the series to Monday nights at 9 pm local time. However, after just one airing in that time slot, CTV returned the series to Sunday nights at 10 pm, effective with the August 20 telecast. CTV aired the final two episodes of season one back to back on Friday, August 25.

From November 25, 2006, to February 3, 2007, CTV rebroadcast the series on Saturdays at 10 pm local time and Sunday afternoons at 4 pm local time. The CTV rebroadcast of the series pilot "Fallen" was an alternate version that included a slightly different opening scene, a different main title segment and some minor editing of a few other scenes.

The N continued to air only one episode a week in the United States, eventually shifting the final five episodes to Saturday mornings at 1 am before completing the series on September 23. The station began re-airing the series on Monday, January 22, 2007, at 5 am but for unexplained reasons omitted airing the first episode "Fallen" and began with the second episode "Out of the Shadows".

The series also aired on the British youth channel Trouble beginning October 16, 2006, on Monday nights at 9 pm and on the Polish catholic channel Puls on Saturday and Sunday evenings at 6:20 pm. French-language broadcasts of Whistler aired from January 30 to April 29, 2007, on a Canadian cable channel, Séries Plus Tuesday nights at 8 pm.

Season 2 began filming on January 8, 2007, and was completed on May 23, 2007. As with the first season, there were 13-second-season episodes. These were aired in Canada by CTV beginning on September 29, 2007, on Saturday nights at 9 pm and concluded on December 15, 2007. Repeats began on Saturday, December 28, 2007.

The N was confirmed as a co-producer and American rights holder for the second season, but opted not to air it on its network for unknown reasons.

Séries Plus in Canada began airing Season 2 in French on Wednesday nights at 8 pm beginning January 9, 2008.

Trouble began airing Season 2 on Sunday July 13, 2008, in a 6 pm and midnight timeslot with repeats the following Saturday.

Bulgaria's TV7 aired a dubbed version of season 2 beginning on November 29, 2007, weekdays until December 13, 2007 (actually airing episodes 212 and 213 before they were broadcast in Canada).

Ireland's national broadcaster RTÉ air Whistler on their second channel RTÉ 2 in the early hours of Saturday morning (around 3 am)

MTV2 in Canada began airing season 1 on Friday, August 8 as part of its inaugural program schedule (the cable channel began broadcasting August 1). First airings of episodes are on Fridays with numerous repeats during the week. The channel continued into Season 2 immediately following the last airing of the Season 1 finale. Another CTV network, "A", began airing Season 1 on February 20, 2009, on Fridays at 10 pm local time. Season 2 began airing on "A" on Saturday, September 12, 2009 also at 10 pm local time.

== Episodes ==
=== Season 1: 2006 ===
| No. overall | No. in season | Title | Directed by | Written by | Original release date | US air date |
|---|---|---|---|---|---|---|
| 1 | 1 | "Fallen" | John Fawcett | Kelly Senecal | June 25, 2006 | June 30, 2006 |
| 2 | 2 | "Out of the Shadows" | John Fawcett | Kelly Senecal | July 2, 2006 | July 7, 2006 |
| 3 | 3 | "Coming Together, Coming Apart" | Grant Harvey | Tony Blake & Paul Jackson | July 9, 2006 | July 14, 2006 |
| 4 | 4 | "Lies and Whispers" | Grant Harvey | Allison Lea Bingeman | July 16, 2006 | July 21, 2006 |
| 5 | 5 | "The Burden of Truth" | James Dunnison | Russ Cochrane | July 23, 2006 | July 28, 2006 |
| 6 | 6 | "Will the Real Beck...?" | James Dunnison | Tony Blake & Paul Jackson | July 24, 2006 | August 4, 2006 |
| 7 | 7 | "In the Air" | Rachel Talalay | Russ Cochrane | July 30, 2006 | August 11, 2006 |
| 8 | 8 | "After the Fall" | Rachel Talalay | Allison Lea Bingeman | August 6, 2006 | August 18, 2006 |
| 9 | 9 | "The Looks of Love" | Grant Harvey | Tony Blake & Paul Jackson | August 13, 2006 | August 25, 2006 |
| 10 | 10 | "Gathering Clouds" | Grant Harvey | Tony Blake & Paul Jackson | August 14, 2006 | September 1, 2006 |
| 11 | 11 | "Scratching the Surface" | Rachel Talalay | Russ Cochrane | August 20, 2006 | September 8, 2006 |
| 12 | 12 | "Meltdown" | Rachel Talalay | Alison Lea Bingeman | August 25, 2006 | August 25, 2006 |
| 13 | 13 | "Unearthed" | Grant Harvey | Kelly Senecal | August 25, 2006 | August 25, 2006 |

=== Season 2: 2007 ===
| No. overall | No. in season | Title | Directed by | Written by | Original release date |
|---|---|---|---|---|---|
| 14 | 1 | "Homecoming" | Grant Harvey | Russ Cochrane & Kelly Senecal | September 29, 2007 |
| 15 | 2 | "Blindsided" | Grant Harvey | Russ Cochrane & Kelly Senecal | October 6, 2007 |
| 16 | 3 | "Hazed and Confused" | Gary Harvey | Lisa Steele | October 13, 2007 |
| 17 | 4 | "End Game" | Gary Harvey | Matt MacLennan | October 20, 2007 |
| 18 | 5 | "Passion Plays" | Grant Harvey | Abigail Kinch | October 27, 2007 |
| 19 | 6 | "Always a Bridesmaid" | Grant Harvey | James Phillips | November 3, 2007 |
| 20 | 7 | "Out of Bounds" | Anthony Atkins | Russ Cochrane | November 10, 2007 |
| 21 | 8 | "Crossroads" | Anthony Atkins | Matt MacLennan | November 17, 2007 |
| 22 | 9 | "Family Ties" | Grant Harvey | Lisa Steele | November 24, 2007 |
| 23 | 10 | "Road Trip" | Grant Harvey | James Phillips | December 1, 2007 |
| 24 | 11 | "The Rules of Attachment: Part 1" | Gary Harvey | Matt MacLennan & Lisa Steele | December 8, 2007 |
| 25 | 12 | "The Rules of Attachment: Part 2" | Gary Harvey | Abigail Kinch & James Phillips | December 15, 2007 |
| 26 | 13 | "Last Run" | Kelly Senecal | Russ Cochrane | December 22, 2007 |

In addition to the 13 first season broadcast episodes, 13 "webisodes" were produced. They were available on The N's "The Click" website and the CTV Broadband Network. The webisodes were short scenes that depicted an event that took place either between broadcast episodes or during an episode (but not seen during the episode). Because the webisodes were not given official titles by the producers, CTV and The N used different titles to refer to them on their respective websites.

For the second season, 10 "Carrie's web diary webisodes" and 10 "deleted scenes" were produced.

== Cast ==
Several characters from season one were let go. David Paetkau's character, Beck McKaye, returned as a special guest star in season two. Brandy Ledford's character, Shelby Varland, returned to season two episode one as a special guest star.

=== Regular ===
- Nick Lea as Ethan McKaye (Season 1 only)
- Jesse Moss as Quinn McKaye
- David Paetkau as Beck McKaye (Season 1 only, recurring Season 2)
- Amanda Crew as Carrie Miller
- Adam J. Harrington as Ryan McKaye
- Holly Dignard (credited as "Holly Elissa Dignard" in Season 2) as Nicole Miller
- Brendan Penny as AJ Varland (Season 1 only)
- Ingrid Kavelaars as Jen McKaye
- Christopher Shyer as Adrien Varland

=== Recurring Season 1 ===
- Haley Beauchamp as Feeney
- Brandy Ledford as Shelby Varland
- Andrew Fallows as Steve Newman
- Kandyse McClure as Lisa
- Steve Bacic as Adam Lawson
- Michaela Mann as Isabelle
- Venus Terzo as Melina Sarris
- John Mann as James Kaliciak
- Michael Eklund as Dante
- Tyron Leitso as Detective Rob Randall

=== Recurring Season 2 ===
- Tamara Hope as Leah Hutton
- Ryan Kennedy as Travis Hollier
- Tommy Lioutas as John "Griff" Griffin
- Ben Cotton as Coach Dean Webber
- Kim Hawthorne as Jada Temple
- Diego Klattenhoff as Derek Brooks
- Janet Wright as Celia
- Tahmoh Penikett as Elias Noth
- Peter Outerbridge as Peter Varland
- Andrew Airlie as Mitchell Douglas
- Scott Hylands as Jonus Varland
- Carly Pope as Bailey

== Music ==
The musical supervision for Whistler is handled by S.L. Feldman and Associates, the same company that supervised the music for Queer as Folk. Season 1 featured music by such Canadian artists as the Dirtmitts (whose song "Ordinary Day" is featured as the series opening track), The Waking Eyes, The Organ, The Stills, Hawksley Workman, Love and Mathematics, Sam Roberts, Pilot Speed, The High Dials, Death from Above 1979, The Dears, The Meligrove Band, You Say Party, Immaculate Machine, and Autumn Eve. The Canadian punk bank DOA was featured in episode 9, "The Looks of Love," with the songs "I Hate You" and "Liar For Hire." The N Soundtrack, containing some of the music used on the show, was released in August 2006.

Season 2 artists include The Yoko Casionos, Ten Second Epic, Sproll, TV Heart Attack, Kill The Lights, The February March, Jets Overhead and Tim Hanauer. Several of the artists perform "live" on stage in the episodes at the series' Last Run Tavern (previously known as the McKaye Tavern in Season 1).

== International broadcasters ==
| Country | TV Network(s) | Series Premiere | Broadcast Schedule |
|---|---|---|---|
| Canada | Séries+ | January 30, 2007 | Season 2 begins airing in French on January 9, 2008 at 8:00 pm EST. |
| Canada | CTV | June 25, 2006 | Season 2 premiered on September 29, 2007 at 9:00 pm EDT and concluded on December 15, 2007 |
| Canada | Atlantic Satellite Network | December 28, 2007 | Season 2 premiered on December 28, 2007 at 11:00 pm AST (ASN, a satellite service of CTV but not part of the national CTV network, did not air Season 1.) |
| Canada | MTV2 | August 8, 2008 | The series (both seasons) is airing at 9:00 pm EDT on Fridays with numerous repeats during the week. MTV2 in Canada, like ASN, is a satellite service of CTV |
| Canada | A | September 12, 2009 | Season 2 is airing at 10:00 pm EDT on Saturdays. The "A" network is CTV's secondary over-the-air broadcast network |
| United States | The N (block on Noggin) | June 30, 2006 | Aired Season 1 in 2006. Holds the rights to Season 2 but no air dates announced |
| United Kingdom | Trouble | October 16, 2006 | Season 1 aired on Mondays at 9:00 pm GMT; Season 2 began airing on July 13, 2008 on Sunday nights at 6:00 pm GMT with repeats on Mondays at midnight, the following Saturday at 6:00 pm and the following Sunday at midnight |
| Poland | TV Puls | January 6, 2007 | Saturdays and Sundays at 6:20 pm CET |
| Serbia | Fox televizija | February 2007 | Aired weekly |
| Latin America | Fox Life | March 12, 2007 | Aired Mondays at 10:00 pm and then moved to Sundays at 7:00 pm |
| Bulgaria | TV7 | November 29, 2007 | Aired Season 2 Monday to Friday at 12:15 am and 12:00 pm CET until December 13, 2007 |
| Kenya | Citizen TV | January 21, 2008 | Aired Season 2 Mondays at 9:30 pm EAT |
| France | NRJ 12 | February 12, 2008 | Aired Season 1 Tuesdays at 8:45 pm and Sundays at 10:15 am CET |
| (Republic of Ireland) Ireland | RTÉ Two | | Airing 3 am Saturdays |
| India | STAR World | | Airing 6 pm Mon-Fri |
| Pakistan | Star World | 2008 | Airing 8 pm Saturdays |
| Switzerland | SF zwei | January 1, 2009 | Airing 6:40 pm Mon-Fri |
| Israel | HOT family | July 9, 2009 | |
| Germany | RTL II | November 21, 2009 | Airing 2:20 pm Saturdays |
