= Evil Feed =

- Directed by: Kimani Ray Smith
- Written by: Kimani Ray Smith
- Produced by: Aaron Au; Dylan Thomas Collingwood; Kimani Ray Smith
- Starring: Laci J. Mailey; Alain Chanoine; Terry Chen; Alyson Bath; Derek Gilroy
- Cinematography: Steven Deneault
- Edited by: Kirby Jinnah
- Music by: Alain Mayrand
- Production companies: Tilt 9 Entertainment; Titlecard Pictures
- Release date: 12 October 2013 (Toronto After Dark Film Festival)
- Running time: 90 minutes
- Country: Canada
- Language: English

Evil Feed is a 2013 Canadian action horror comedy film directed by Kimani Ray Smith in his feature debut. The screenplay, by Smith, Aaron Au and Jana Mitsoula, is based on a story by special make-up effects artist Ryan Nicholson. It stars Laci J. Mailey, Terry Chen, Alain Chanoine, Alyson Bath and Derek Gilroy. Set in an underground restaurant that serves human flesh, the film follows a group of martial artists who break in after their friends are abducted for its fight-to-the-death pit. Evil Feed premiered at the Toronto After Dark Film Festival on 12 October 2013.

== Plot ==
The Long Pig is a secret restaurant whose wealthy regulars know that the meat on the menu comes from people. When the elderly owner decides to sell up rather than leave the business to his son, the son, Steven, kills him and takes charge. He then turns the basement into a venue where abducted fighters are made to battle each other, with the losers killed and cooked for the diners, who bet on the matches as they eat. Jenna, a young woman training as a stunt performer, finds out that her father has been seized along with others from her martial arts school. She and her friends sneak into the restaurant to get them out, only to run up against Steven's partner Yuki and a visiting restaurateur from London who is after the kitchen's recipes.

== Cast ==
- Laci J. Mailey as Jenna
- Alain Chanoine as Steven
- Terry Chen as Tyrone
- Alyson Bath as Yuki
- Derek Gilroy as Brian
- Bishop Brigante as Carlos
- Curtis Lum as Pete
- Sebastian Stewart as Nash
- David Milchard as The Bookie
- Carrie Genzel as Madame Dragonfly

== Reception ==
Collette Hughes of VultureHound wrote that the film "falls into the it’s so bad that it’s good category", and praised the choreography and the Bath's performance.

Scott Foy of Dread Central rated the film 2.5 stars out of 5 and wrote: "Feeling too forced is probably the biggest thing preventing Evil Feed from achieving the modern grindhouse tone it strives for." Foy also criticised the performances, but called Bath a "standout".

James Perkins of Starburst wrote: "While enjoyable in parts, Evil Feed doesn’t quite live up to its bonkers premise. With too many styles and ideas battling for attention, its brilliantly repulsive moments become a little lost in the mix."

Garry McConnachie of Daily Record rated the film 2 stars out of 5, and wrote that it is "bereft of laughs and scares". However, he also praised Bath's performance, as well as the high body count.

== Production ==
Evil Feed marked the feature directing debut of Kimani Ray Smith, who had previously worked as a stuntman and stunt coordinator on Hollywood productions. The film was based on a story by the Canadian special make-up effects artist Ryan Nicholson.
