= Sproll (band) =

Canadian indie rock band

- Origin: Moncton, New Brunswick, Canada
- Genre: Indie rock
- Years active: 2003–present
- Labels: Quadraphonic Records; Outside Music
- Members: Corey Hachey; Neal MacLean; Glen Austin Farquhar; Thom Cooke
- Website: sproll.ca

Sproll is a Canadian indie rock band that was formed in 2003 in Moncton, New Brunswick.

The band Sproll consists of lead vocalist Corey Hachey, guitarist Neal MacLean, bassist Glen Austin Farquhar, and drummer Thom Cooke. Their debut EP titled Soft Science was released in February 2006 and garnered a nominated for an East Coast Music Award in 2007 for NEWCAP Rock Recording of the Year. The songs "More Than You" and "Nobody's Fault" have been used on the television show Whistler. Tracks from the album were also featured on the 2007 East Coast Music compilation, and the 2007 Atlantic Film Festival compilation.

Their latest album titled Turn On Your Radio was released on January 15, 2008. Their song "Radio", from the album, serves as the theme song for Information Morning Moncton's CBC Radio show since the fall of 2016.

== History ==
In 2002, guitarist Neal MacLean and vocalist Corey Hachey (who had previously met years ago) unknowingly moved to the same city and found themselves looking to become part of the music scene. They eventually met up by chance and started the group right away, seeking out two more members. After many auditions, bassist Glen Farquhar and drummer Thom Cooke completed the foursome in May 2003 and Sproll started writing music and performing in local clubs.

Over the next year, the band wrote a collection of songs and enlisted the help of producer Laurence Currie at Idea of East in Halifax, Nova Scotia. During the winter months of 2005 and 2006, pre-production of the EP Soft Science took place and was subsequently recorded during the spring-summer of 2006 at Idea of East studios. The album was released Canada wide with distribution by Outside Music and online by Maple Music and iTunes.

After touring throughout Canada and the North Eastern US from the summer of 2006 til the spring of 2007, the band once again enlisted the help of producer Laurence Currie to work with them on their latest full-length recording, Turn on your radio. Recorded in Toronto, Ontario, at Signal to Noise Studios and Sunnyside Studios from spring 2007 til fall 2007, the new album consisted of 11 tracks and was available in early 2008.

== Present ==
With the new album completed, the band is focusing on planning their release in early 2008. While information for the new album is scarce, guitarist Neal MacLean has said that "...we are very proud of the new album. It definitely shows our maturation of songwriting to date and we had a great time recording it."

== Discography ==
=== EPs ===
- Soft Science (Recorded 2006)

=== Albums ===
- Turn On Your Radio (Recorded 2007) - Release in early 2008
