= Chesapeake Shores =

Drama television series

- Genre: Romance drama
- Based on: Chesapeake Shores by Sherryl Woods
- Developed by: John Tinker; Nancey Silvers
- Showrunners: John Tinker; Nancey Silvers; Phoef Sutton
- Starring: Jesse Metcalfe; Meghan Ory; Barbara Niven; Laci J. Mailey; Emilie Ullerup; Brendan Penny; Andrew Francis; Diane Ladd; Treat Williams; Robert Buckley
- Opening theme: "Coming Home Soon" by Adam Woodall Band "Home" by Daughtry
- Countries of origin: Canada; United States
- Original language: English
- No. of seasons: 6
- No. of episodes: 55 (list of episodes)

Production
- Executive producers: John Tinker; Dan Paulson; Martin Wood; Nancey Silvers; Sherryl Woods; Michael Berns; Phoef Sutton
- Producer: Matt Spark
- Production locations: Vancouver Island, British Columbia
- Camera setup: Multiple-camera
- Running time: 48–96 minutes
- Production companies: Chesapeake Shores Productions Inc. (S1-S5); Daniel L. Paulson Entertainment

Original release
- Network: Hallmark Channel
- Release: August 14, 2016 – October 16, 2022

Chesapeake Shores is a romance drama television series, based on the series of novels of the same name by Sherryl Woods, produced by Chesapeake Shores Productions Inc in association with Borderline Distribution. The series had a two-hour premiere on the Hallmark Channel on August 14, 2016. Jesse Metcalfe, Meghan Ory, Barbara Niven, Laci J. Mailey, Emilie Ullerup, Brendan Penny, Andrew Francis, Diane Ladd and Treat Williams star in the series. John Tinker was showrunner and executive producer for the first two seasons. Phoef Sutton became the showrunner and principal writer for season five.

In March 2021, it was announced that Metcalfe would be exiting the series. His character's storyline concluded early in the fifth season. Actor Robert Buckley joined the main cast in season five. The show's fifth season aired from August 15 to October 17, 2021. The series' sixth and final season premiered on August 14, 2022, with the series finale airing on October 16, 2022.

== Synopsis ==
Abby O'Brien Winters returns from New York to her hometown of Chesapeake Shores, Maryland, after receiving a panicked phone call from her youngest sister Jess, who is renovating the Inn at Eagle Point. Abby's demanding career, divorce, and young daughters have kept her too busy to even think about the town her father built. Saving her sister's inn from foreclosure means dealing not only with her fractured family but also with Trace Riley, her first love whom she abruptly left sixteen years ago. He initially is an obstacle but becomes an unexpected ally and a second chance at finding love. The troubled family dynamic is intensified when Abby's estranged mother comes back to town.

== Episodes ==
Season	Episodes	Originally released	
Season	Episodes	First released	Last released
1	9	August 14, 2016	October 9, 2016
2	10	August 6, 2017	October 8, 2017
3	10	August 5, 2018	October 7, 2018
4	6	August 25, 2019	September 29, 2019
5	10	August 15, 2021	October 17, 2021
6	10	August 14, 2022	October 16, 2022

== Cast ==
=== Main ===
- Jesse Metcalfe as Trace Riley (seasons 1–5); (Note: For Season 5, Metcalfe is only credited as a series regular for the first two episodes.) a musician and Abby's first love who has returned to Chesapeake Shores from Nashville. After high school, Abby abruptly left Trace and Chesapeake Shores without warning, which they had to work through upon her return.
- Meghan Ory as Abby O'Brien-Winters: a high-powered New York City career woman, divorcée, mother to two young daughters, and the oldest of Mick and Megan's five children. After years away from her family, she takes a trip to her hometown of Chesapeake Shores and decides to stay.
- Barbara Niven as Megan O'Brien: Mick's estranged wife. Some of her children held a grudge over her leaving many years ago, but she claims Mick left her no choice. She couldn't be around him, but also didn't want to uproot the children from their home.
- Laci J. Mailey as Jess O'Brien-Peck: Abby's youngest sister who has bought a dilapidated old inn that she intends to transform into a bed and breakfast. On the brink of financial disaster, she must call on Abby to save her from early bankruptcy.
- Emilie Ullerup as Bree Elizabeth O'Brien: Abby's younger sister who is a struggling playwright. Her first play earned her glowing reviews, but she has found it difficult to duplicate its success. Her writer's block and her grandmother's illness cause her to return home.
- Brendan Penny as Kevin O'Brien, older son of Mick and Megan. Initially a medic in the U.S. Army with eyes on becoming a doctor, he explores other career opportunities in season two. He ends up becoming a paramedic.
- Andrew Francis as Connor O'Brien, younger son of Mick and Megan who is initially a law student, and later an aspiring attorney.
- Diane Ladd as Nell O'Brien: matriarch of the O'Briens and Mick's mother. When Megan moved out and Mick was frequently on the road for work, Nell became the children's primary caregiver.
- Treat Williams as Mick O'Brien: patriarch of the O'Briens who runs his own construction company. His wife Megan left him many years ago, making him a single father working hard to provide for his family.
- Robert Buckley as Evan Kincaid (season 5–6), a successful entrepreneur who brings a development project to town. He later becomes Abby's love interest.

=== Recurring ===
- Abbie Magnuson as Caitlyn Winters, daughter of Abby and Wes
- Kayden Magnuson as Carrie Winters, daughter of Abby and Wes
- Serge Houde as Del Granger, Abby's boss at Capital Management in Baltimore (seasons 1–4)
- Britt Irvin as Danielle Clayman, Connor's law school classmate who becomes his love interest (seasons 1–4)
- Karen Kruper as Dee Riley, Trace's mother (seasons 1–4)
- Tom Butler as Lawrence Riley, Trace's father (seasons 1–4)
- Carlo Marks as David Peck, the chef at Jess' inn whom she learns is from a very wealthy family; he becomes her boyfriend and eventual husband
- Michael Karl Richards as Wes Winters, Abby's ex-husband and father to Caitlyn and Carrie (seasons 1–3)
- Brittany Willacy as Leigh Corley, Trace's bandmate and songwriting partner (seasons 1–3)
- Ali Liebert as Georgia Eyles, Kevin's ex-fiancé (season 1)
- Kyle Cassie as Martin Demming, Bree's former longtime boyfriend (seasons 1–2)
- Jessica Sipos as Sarah Mercer-O’Brien, a local firefighter and Kevin's love interest, who later becomes his wife (season 2–6)
- Bradley Stryker as John Rawl, bassist for Trace's former band who later joins the Trace Riley Band (seasons 2–3)
- Gregory Harrison as Thomas O'Brien, Mick's brother who is an environmental attorney (seasons 2–6)
- Victor Webster as Douglas Peterson, a widower that Abby meets who later partners with Mick in a land development deal (seasons 2–3)
- Jerry Trimble as Mark Hall, a Nashville music executive who takes an interest in the Trace Riley Band (seasons 2–4)
- Oliver Rice as Simon Atwater, a novelist and Bree's love interest (seasons 2–4)
- Kent Sheridan as Donovan Wylie, an established country music star with whom the Trace Riley Band is touring as an opening act (seasons 3–4)
- Teryl Rothery as Robin O'Brien, Thomas' wife (season 3)
- Malcolm Stewart as Dennis Peck, David's father (seasons 3, 5–6)
- Gillian Barber as Deidra Peck, David's mother (seasons 3, 5–6)
- Jordana Largy as Alexandra Peck, David's sister (seasons 3, 6)
- Lanie McAuley as Emma Rogers, a bartender at The Bridge and an aspiring singer (season 4)
- Marci T. House as Hannah Urso, a respected playwright who offers to help Bree with details of her new play (season 4)
- Greyston Holt as Jay Ross, a third grade teacher and Abby's potential new love interest (seasons 4–5)
- Stephen Huszar as Luke Tatum, a down-on-his-luck former high school acquaintance of Kevin's who returns to Chesapeake Shores (seasons 5–6)
- Raylene Harewood (season 5) and Mariesa Crouse (season 6) as Margaret Keller, a paralegal at Connor's new law firm; she later becomes Connor's paralegal when he launches a private practice and his love interest (seasons 5–6)
- Keith Dinicol as Arthur Driscoll, a once-respected artist who has become reclusive (season 5)
- Matthew Kevin Anderson as Jerry Trask, a former high school nemesis of Bree's who becomes her boss when she accepts a teaching job (season 5)
- Wesley Salter as Mandrake (a.k.a. Alan Wilkins), Evan Kincaid's chauffeur, personal assistant and confidante (seasons 5–6)

== Production ==
Chesapeake Shores is filmed on Vancouver Island's Qualicum Beach and its neighboring town of Parksville, British Columbia. The first season was filmed there from May through July 2016.

In addition to playing the character Trace, Jesse Metcalfe performs some of the songs used in the series' episodes. A songwriter for more than a decade, Metcalfe also composed two of the songs himself.

Production for the second season started in spring 2017. It premiered on August 6, 2017. On January 13, 2018, Hallmark announced that the show was renewed for a 10-episode third season, which premiered on August 5, 2018.

At the Television Critics Association winter press tour in February 2019, it was announced that the series would return for a fourth summer season, consisting of only six episodes; a spinoff television film was simultaneously announced. The fourth season premiered on August 25, 2019.

On February 28, 2020, it was announced that the series would return for a fifth season. Season five premiered on August 15, 2021.

On March 29, 2022, it was announced that the series was renewed for a sixth and final season, expected to premiere in its usual August slot.

== Broadcast ==
The series premiered on the Hallmark Channel on August 14, 2016. It premiered on Canada's W Network on August 25, 2016.

Netflix holds the international streaming rights to Chesapeake Shores and releases episodes on a weekly basis. Sony Pictures Television handles the show's international rights.

As of 2023, all episodes of Chesapeake Shores are available to stream on Peacock.

== Reception ==
=== Critical reception ===
Neil Genzlinger of The New York Times said Chesapeake Shores is "as well scrubbed and predictable as they come — in other words, perfectly suited to Hallmark's target audience." He added, "fans of [Sherryl Woods's series of novels], at least, will probably enjoy seeing this annoyingly pristine world brought to life."

Gwen Ihnat of The A.V. Club gave the two-hour series premiere a B grade, praising the "ethereally gorgeous" Meghan Ory and the "acting powerhouses" of Treat Williams and Diane Ladd. She added that they "may make the show worth watching, and the giddy chemistry of the romantic leads certainly doesn't hurt."

=== Viewership ===
Chesapeake Shores' two-hour premiere on Sunday, August 14, 2016, was seen by 1.942 million viewers. Its largest ratings demographic were people over the age of 50, with a 1.42 share, followed by a 0.45 share among women aged 18 to 49. Over the course of the first season, the series was Hallmark's "most-watched in the network's history" by women and adults in the 25–54 age demographic in its live plus three days (L+3) of DVR viewing, leading to its second-season renewal.
