= Terry Chen =

Canadian actor (born 1975)

- Born: Terence Chen; February 3, 1975 (age 51); Edmonton, Alberta, Canada
- Occupation: Actor
- Years active: 1999–present

Terence Chen (born February 3, 1975) is a Canadian actor.

== Early life ==
Chen was born on February 3, 1975, in Edmonton, Alberta, to Taiwanese and mainland Chinese parents originating from Taiwan (father) and mainland China (mother). After primary and secondary education in Edmonton and Vancouver, British Columbia, he briefly studied at the University of Calgary before later moving to Vancouver to pursue acting.

== Career ==
Chen's breakout role was as real-life Rolling Stone editor Ben Fong-Torres in the 2000 Cameron Crowe film Almost Famous. He has appeared in several television shows, including Steven Spielberg's TV miniseries Taken, and was a series regular on Combat Hospital. Chen has appeared in feature films I, Robot, The Chronicles of Riddick, Snakes on a Plane and had a leading role in the horror/thriller They Wait.

Chen played a recurring role in the Canadian science fiction series Continuum, which premiered on Showcase on May 27, 2012. Chen portrayed Xander Feng in Season 2 of Netflix's House of Cards. From 2017 to 2018 he played botanist Praxideke Meng in The Expanse seasons 2 and 3, and in 2018 appeared in season 2 of Jessica Jones as Pryce Cheng.

In the film Falling, Chen plays the understanding husband of a man (played by actor/director Viggo Mortensen) trying to care for his homophobic, misogynist and increasingly demented father.

== Filmography ==
=== Film ===
Year	Title	Role	Notes
1999	Late Night Sessions	Unknown	
2000	Romeo Must Die	Kung	
2000	Trixie	Waiter	
2000	Almost Famous	Ben Fong-Torres	
2000	Island of Shadows: D'Arcy Island Leper Colony, 1891-1924	New York Syphilitic	
2001	3000 Miles to Graceland	Policeman	
2001	The Waiting Room	Unknown	
2002	Liberty Stands Still	Officer Tom	
2002	40 Days and 40 Nights	Neil	
2002	Stark Raving Mad	Jin Sun	
2002	Various Positions	Ian	
2002	Ballistic: Ecks vs. Sever	FBI Agent Harry Lee	
2004	The Chronicles of Riddick	Merc Pilot	
2004	I, Robot	Chin	
2005	Chaos	Chris Lei	
2005	Underclassman	'Sleepy' Jones	
2006	Mem-o-re	Dr. Deepra Chang	
2006	Snakes on a Plane	Chen Leong	
2007	War	Tom Lone	
2007	They Wait	Jason	
2008	Dim Sum Funeral	Funeral Store Owner	
2009	Hardwired	Carter Burke	
2009	Storm Seekers	Tommy Cramer	
2009	Bottom Feeders	Terry Chiu	Short
2009	Rock Slyde	David	
2010	The A-Team	Ravech	
2010	Riverworld	Eddie	
2010	Guido Superstar: The Rise of Guido	Andrew Cho	
2011	Something Old, Something New	Groom	Short
2011	Matty Hanson and the Invisibility Ray	Unknown	
2012	The Cabin in the Woods	Operations Guy	
2013	Elysium	Technician	
2013	Tasmanian Devils	Walsh	
2013	Evil Feed	Steven	
2016	Tomboy, a Revenger's Tale	Dr. Lin	
2020	Falling	Eric Peterson	
2021	Demonic	Daniel	
2024	Sight	Ming Wang	
2024	Lucky Star	Lucky	

=== Television ===
Year	Title	Role	Notes
1999	The Sentinel	Gang Member #1	
1999	Aftershock: Earthquake in New York	FEMA Tech #2	TV movie
2000	The Fearing Mind	Loc Tran Minh	2 episodes
2000	Stargate SG-1	Monk	
2000	Sole Survivor	Lee Kwong	TV movie
2000–2005	Da Vinci's Inquest	William Chen	10 episodes
2001	MythQuest	Dionysus	
2001–2002	Mary-Kate and Ashley in Action!	Rodney Choy (voice)	7 episodes
2002	Mentors	Student of Wong Fei Hung	
2002	Dark Angel	S1W Member	
2002	Taken	Dr. Powell	
2002	Paranormal Girl	Unknown	TV movie
2003	Jake 2.0	Chinese Agent	
2003	The Twilight Zone	Nathan Park	
2003	A Tale of Two Wives	Bruno	TV movie
2004	Smallville	Detective Paul Cage	
2004	The 4400	Colin Chen	Episode: "Pilot"
2004	The Love Crimes of Gillian Guess	Jerry, Defense Lawyer	TV movie
2004	The Life	Daryl	TV movie
2004–2005	Battlestar Galactica	Perry / 'Chuckles'	2 episodes
2005	Terminal City	Doctor	
2005	Robson Arms	Rollerblading Buddy	
2006	The Evidence	Tui Huang	
2006–2007	Big Day	Johnny	8 episodes
2008	The Guard	Steve	
2008	The Quality of Life	Kent Louie	TV movie
2008	Love to Kill	Richard	TV movie
2009	Wild Roses	Fukuwawa Jr.	
2009	Defying Gravity	Ethan Lee	
2009	Web of Desire	Dr. Tim Massey	TV movie
2010	Psych	Tom Fong	
2010	Sanctuary	Charles	3 episodes
2011	Combat Hospital	Captain Dr. Bobby Trang, MD	13 episodes
2011	Befriend and Betray	Donny	TV movie
2012	Nikita	Inspector Jeong	
2012	Battlestar Galactica: Blood & Chrome	Crew Chief Tiu	TV movie
2012–2015	Continuum	Curtis Chen	22 episodes
2013	Bomb Girls	Kai Low	
2013	Arrow	Soldier	
2013	Bates Motel	Ethan Chang	3 episodes
2013	Time of Death	Stephen Choi	TV movie
2013	Survival Code	Roger Chin	TV movie
2014	House of Cards	Xander Feng	5 episodes
2014	The 100	Commander Shumway	4 episodes
2014–2015	Strange Empire	Ling	12 episodes
2015	Backstrom	Dominic Chan	
2015	The Returned	Deputy Mark Bao	7 episodes
2016	Van Helsing	Brendan	5 episodes
2017–2018, 2021	The Expanse	Praxidike Meng	13 episodes
2018	Jessica Jones	Pryce Cheng	6 episodes
2018	Unreal	Guy Moretti	6 episodes
2019	The Murders	Bill Chen	8 episodes
2019	Chimerica	Zhang Lin	Mini-Series
2020	Legends of Tomorrow	Genghis Khan	Episode: "Mortal Khanbat"
2020	Big Sky	Mitchell Banks	Episode: "Pilot"
2020–2021	A Million Little Things	Alan Kay	10 episodes
2022	The Good Doctor	Owen	2 episodes
2022	Kung Fu	Daniel Yan	Recurring; 6 episodes
2022	Blood & Treasure	Arthur Chan	2 episodes
2022–2023	The Lake	Victor Lin	15 episodes
2023	The Last of Us	Captain Kwong	Episode: "Left Behind"
2024–present	Wild Cards	Chief Li	
2024	The Spiderwick Chronicles	Zao	Episode: "A Midsummer's Daydream"
2024	Under the Bridge	Stan Lowe	2 episodes
2026	Avatar: The Last Airbender	Jeong Jeong	2 episodes

=== Video games ===
Year	Title	Role	Notes
2001	Smuggler's Run 2: Hostile Territory	Tan	
2002	Smuggler's Run: Warzones	Tan	
