= Freshman Father =

- French: Père avant l'heure
- Genre: drama
- Based on: a true story of John Wand
- Written by: Bill Wells
- Directed by: Michael Scott
- Music by: Michael Neilson
- Countries of origin: United States, Canada
- Original language: English

Production
- Producer: Harvey Kahn
- Cinematography: Adam Sliwinski
- Running time: 89 minutes
- Production companies: Freshman Father Productions; The Hallmark Channel et Front Street Pictures (coproductions)

Original release
- Network: Hallmark Channel
- Release: June 5, 2010

Freshman Father is an American-Canadian television drama film directed by Michael Scott, aired in 2010. It is inspired by a true story of John Wand in 1970.

== Synopsis ==
Based on the true story of John Wand, an 18-year-old kid from Idaho who was about to enter Harvard on a full ride when he found out that his high school girlfriend was pregnant.

Kathy (Britt Irvin) and John (Drew Seeley) are a young couple, united and very much in love. They are the prom king and queen of their high school in Idaho and both have bright futures ahead of them. John is expected to attend Harvard in the fall, and Kathy has plans to attend state school.

However, things don't go as planned when Kathy announces before the end of the summer that she is pregnant. They decide to do what they believe is best, get married and move to Cambridge so that John can continue with his plan to pursue his studies as a freshman at Harvard University with a scholarship. Once they arrive at Harvard they are shunted into married student housing and are faced with the task of finding jobs to support themselves and their child.

John carries a full course load and still manages to work part-time at a local bookstore. Meanwhile, Kathy finds herself a job as a bank teller. Life is rough for the young couple. While they are struggling to save up enough money to support themselves and prepare for the new baby, the other freshmen are out having fun and partying.

Life only continues to get harder for Kathy and John with the arrival of their son, Adam. The baby cries continuously and John is struggling in school - earning a "D" on a calculus test. His professor recommends that he drop the class which worries John as calculus is his major. Kathy is not prepared for her new life of crying babies and student-housing and, despite her husbands immense amount of love for her and their son, she decides to leave her husband and son behind and go back home to Idaho.

With his wife gone, John no longer qualifies for married student housing and must find a new house for him and Adam while struggling to juggle the tasks of everyday life with the baby, pursuing his studies and working part-time. This leads to him renting a room from a psychic (Dorothy Downs) who encourages him to continue studies while raising his son.

== Cast ==
- Drew Seeley : John Patton
- Britt Irvin : Kathy Patton
- Ryan McDonald: Jake
- Julian D. Christopher: Teacher Cowell
- Merrilyn Gann : Ms Patton
- Barb Tyson : Marion Blair
- Anthony Shim : Danny
- Kim Zimmer : Doyen Frost
- Annie Potts : Dorothy Downs
- Peter Hall : Steve Patton
- Austin Rothwell : Chris Patton
- Maureen Patton : Ms Needham
- Jude Butler & Eli Butler : Baby Adam

== Production ==
With the support of society Freshman Father Productions, the film crew turns all scenes in Victoria BC Canada.

The theme song at the Best Time is interpreted by Drew Seeley, who is also the co-author along with Brandon Christy and Jeannie Lurie.
