= A Dash of Love =

- Written by: Sandra Berg; Judith Berg; Sib Ventress
- Directed by: Christie Will Wolf
- Starring: Jen Lilley; Brendan Penny; Peri Gilpin; Kandyse McClure; Frances Flanagan; Eric Pollins
- Music by: James Jandrisch
- Country of origin: United States
- Original language: English

Production
- Producer: Kim Arnott
- Editor: Ron Yoshida
- Running time: 84 minutes

Original release
- Network: Hallmark Channel
- Release: February 11, 2017

A Dash of Love, also known as A Pinch of Love, is a 2017 comedy romance television film directed by Christie Will Wolf, and written by Sandra Berg (teleplay), Judith Berg (teleplay), Sib Ventress (story). It produced by the Hallmark Channel and Crown Media Family Networks, airing as the third film in the 2017 lineup of the "Countdown to Valentine's Day" seasonal programming block.

== Plot ==
Nikki Turner (Jen Lilley) an aspiring chef ids hired by celebrity chef Holly Hanson to work at Hanson's restaurant. Turner begins preparing original dishes of her own creation and develops a close friendship with executive chef Paul Dellucci after an initially difficult working relationship. Hanson, who presents a friendly public persona, dismisses both Nikki and Paul after learning they had dinner together at a restaurant she had not approved. In response Turner and Dellucci open their own restaurant aiming to demonstrate that their cooking surpasses Hanson's. As they compete against Hanson, the two develop new dishes together and become romantically involved.

== Cast ==
- Jen Lilley as Nikki Turner, an optimistic girl who is creative with cooking. When the Flop Two diner closes down, she accepts a job as assistant to her idol, the famed chef, cookbook author and restaurateur Holly Hanson.
- Brendan Penny as Paul Dellucci, an executive chef to Holly Hanson. Paul has been pressuring Holly to update the menu with new and exciting dishes, she brushes off suggestions. Finally, he rent the closed Flop Two diner with Nikki, and create a three-day pop-up restaurant for Valentine's Day called Cafe Cupid.
- Peri Gilpin as Holly Hanson, the owner of a restaurant. Holly discovers Nikki's passion and allows her to use the restaurant's kitchen to practice, as long as she does not tell anyone her secret.

== Reception ==
Critic Mark Kermode calls this movie is a "slow build to a cute movie" and gives actress Jen Lilley a praise for her performance by saying that "You want her to succeed and have a satisfying conclusion". Just as well, the United Kingdom movie review organisation called The Movie Scene praises Hallmark Channel for the feat of this movie, saying that "they know exactly what their movies are about, they know what their audience is like, and they know how to take a familiar set up and still keep it entertaining." The reviewer states that the movie "Makes it less about the day (valentine's day) and more about the characters" and that the conclusion to the film "Not only gives a happy ending, but makes the story more realistic".
