= The Assistants =

- Promotional poster featuring the cast (from left to right), Britt Irvin, Michael B. Jordan, Meaghan Rath and Brendan Penny.
- Created by: Will McRobb Chris Viscardi
- Starring: Britt Irvin; Meaghan Rath; Brendan Penny; Michael B. Jordan; Zak Santiago
- Country of origin: Canada
- Original language: English
- No. of seasons: 1
- No. of episodes: 13

Production
- Executive producers: Thomas W. Lynch; Will McRobb; Chris Viscardi
- Camera setup: Film; Single-camera
- Running time: 22 minutes
- Production companies: Tom Lynch Company Studios; The N Original Productions

Original release
- Network: The N (July-September 2009); TeenNick (October 2009) (Note: "The Roomies")
- Release: 10 July – 2 October 2009

The Assistants is a Canadian sitcom created by Will McRobb and Chris Viscardi. In the United States, the series aired on The N and later TeenNick.

== Premise ==
Gillian, an aspiring actress, has become an assistant to film producer Zak Del Toro in the hopes of jump-starting her filmmaking career. She, with Zak's other assistants, Danny, Rigby, and Nate, fulfills Zak's tasks at Kinky Bunny Picture, typically involving an undesirable task.

== Cast ==
=== Main ===
- Britt Irvin as Gillian Hughes – The newest assistant of Kinky Bunny Pictures. She aspires to be a director and directs movies on the side. Gillian is new and naive, coming to Kinky Bunny without knowing about the outrageous and eccentric tasks that Zak has his workers fulfill. She is the kind and generous one in the group but has proved that she can bite back (especially at Rigby).
- Meaghan Rath as Rigby Hastings – A manipulative and often difficult person to get along with. She is usually seen giving backhanded and insulting comments or exploiting situations. Rigby was the only girl who worked at Kinky Bunny until Gillian arrived, which sparked a competitive jealousy. Despite her tough personality, her no-joke manner does get things done, and like the other assistants, her creative moments have helped situations.
- Brendan Penny as Danny Newell – The assistant most like a "regular guy" and the most absent-minded; he often fumbles his duties. He is later chosen as the star of Gillian's independent film. He has a crush on Gillian.
- Michael B. Jordan as Nate Warren – The assistant who always gets stuck with Zak's oddest and usually grossest jobs. He puts a lot of effort into doing his tasks and also trying to impress Gillian's best friend.
- Zak Santiago as Zak Del Toro – The head of Kinky Bunny Pictures. He often gives his assistants ridiculous duties to do.

=== Recurring ===
- Jocelyne Loewen as Hope
- Melanie Papalia as Sandra
- Ali Mukaddam as Heston Nidalu

=== Guest ===
- Brendan Meyer as Barry Collins
- Eva Marcille as Alicia James
- Katharine Isabelle as Paulette Reubin

== Production ==
The show was produced and filmed at Tom Lynch Company Studios with funding from The N Original Productions. The series consisted of 13 22-minute episodes.

== Broadcast ==
Reruns aired on TeenNick until October 8, 2010.

== Episodes ==
No.	Title	Directed by	Written by	Original release date
1	"The Car"	James Genn	Boyce Bugliari & Jamie McLaughlin	10 July 2009
Zak gives a demand to Gillian to sell his car before the end of the day.
2	"The Star"	James Genn	Sarah Jane Cunningham & Suzie V. Freeman	17 July 2009
Gillian bonds with a Hollywood star at a press event. Rigby tries to get her script read by a producer. Danny teaches Nate to "do nothing" at work.
3	"Rehab"	Mark Sawers	Sarah Jane Cunningham & Suzie V. Freeman	24 July 2009
Gillian has to give a script to an actress who is in rehab. While there, she is checked in as a patient and can't get out.
4	"The Premiere"	Mark Sawers	Boyce Bugliari & Jamie McLaughlin	31 July 2009
Gillian has to prepare a ritual for Zak, and Nate tries to get a gift bag for a woman.
5	"The Morning After"	James Genn	Boyce Bugliari & Jamie McLaughlin	7 August 2009
Rigby attempts to avoid Heston after last night. Meanwhile, Zak receives upsetting news and wants his baby blanket back from his nephew.
6	"The Pen"	James Genn	Boyce Bugliari & Jamie McLaughlin	14 August 2009
Gillian accompanies Zak to a meeting where she must take notes. However, once there, she discovers her pen has no ink.
7	"The Addiction"	Jonathan A. Rosenbaum	Sarah Jane Cunningham & Suzie V. Freeman	21 August 2009
Gillian and Danny find themselves constantly making out. Meanwhile, Nate finds trouble while on an errand for Zak.
8	"The Break Up"	James Genn & Mark Sawers	Sam Johnson & Chris Marcil	28 August 2009
Gillian's film has been chosen to show at a film festival; however, only if she 'cuts' out Danny's scenes. Meanwhile, Zak asks her to break up with his girlfriend. Guest star: Brendan Meyer Mr. Young as "Barry Collins"
9	"The Wrap Party"	Jonathan A. Rosenbaum	Sarah Jane Cunningham & Suzie V. Freeman	4 September 2009
Gillian decides to throw a screening party to show off the finished product after completing her short film project.
10	"The Loophole"	Jonathan A. Rosenbaum	Will McRobb & Chris Viscardi	11 September 2009
After a psychic tells Zak that he is about to die, Gillian begins to plan his funeral.
11	"The Bully"	James Genn	Emmy Laybourne	18 September 2009
After Gillian discovers a rumor that another producer has stolen Zak's idea for a new film, the assistants try to find the truth.
12	"The Competitions"	Jonathan A. Rosenbaum & Mark Sawers	Hollis Rich	25 September 2009
Gillian wants to reunite with her ex-boyfriend; Rigby is interested in Gillian's ex-boyfriend.
13	"The Roomies"	Jonathan A. Rosenbaum	Sam Johnson, Chris Marcil & Julia Ruchman	2 October 2009
Gillian forces Rigby to be nice if she is to be her roommate, but soon learns what type of monster she's created. Meanwhile, Danny tries to become smarter.
