= Sherryl Woods =

American novelist

- Born: July 23, 1944 (age 82); Arlington, Virginia, U.S.
- Education: Ohio State University
- Occupation: Novelist
- Writing career
- Pen name: Alexandra Kirk; Suzanne Sherrill
- Period: 1982–present
- Genres: Romantic novel, mystery novel
- Website: www.sherrylwoods.com

Sherryl Woods (pen names Alexandra Kirk and Suzanne Sherrill; born July 23, 1944, Arlington, Virginia) is an American writer of over 110 romance and mystery novels since 1982. Her Chesapeake Shores novels inspired a six season series on Hallmark Channel. In addition, the Netflix series Sweet Magnolias is based on Woods' books, and she serves as an executive producer for the series.

She splits her time between Colonial Beach, Virginia, and Florida.

== Biography ==
Woods was born on July 23, 1944, in Arlington, Virginia. She graduated from Ohio State University with a degree in journalism. She worked for several newspapers, covering everything from suburban government to entertainment, eventually specializing in television. She became the television editor for papers in Ohio and Florida. She served as president of the guild for Miami City Ballet for three terms.

Woods published her first romance novels in 1982 as "Alexandra Kirk" and "Suzanne Sherrill". In 1985 she published her first book as "Sherryl Woods". In 1986, she left her work as a journalist to write full-time. She also writes two mystery series by fictional sleuths: Molly DeWitt and Amanda Roberts.

== Bibliography ==
=== Stand alone novels ===
- Restoring Love (1982) (writing as Suzanne Sherrill)
- Sand Castles (1983) (writing as Alexandra Kirk)
- Desirable Compromise (1984) (writing as Suzanne Sherrill)
- Thrown for a Loss (1984)
- Images of Love (1986) (writing as Alexandra Kirk)
- Not at Eight, Darling (1986)
- Yesterday's Love (1986)
- Come Fly with Me (1987)
- A Gift of Love (1987)
- Safe Harbor (1987)
- Never Let Go (1988)
- Edge of Forever (1988)
- In Too Deep (1989)
- Heartland (1989)
- Miss Liz's Passion (1989)
- Tea and Destiny (1990)
- Fever Pitch (1991)
- My Dearest Cal (1991)
- Joshua and the Cowgirl (1991)
- Dream Mender (1992)
- The Parson's Waiting (1994)
- One Step Away (1994)
- Temptation (1996)
- Twilight (1997)
- Amazing Gracie (1998)
- After Tex (1999)
- Angel Mine (2000)
- The Adam's Dynasty (2002)
- Bachelor-and Baby! (2003)
- Flamingo Diner (2003)
- Mending Fences (2007)

=== And Baby Makes Three ===
- A Christmas Blessing (1995)
- Natural Born Daddy (1995)
- The Cowboy and His Baby (1996)
- The Rancher and His Unexpected Daughter (1996)
- The Littlest Angel (1997)
- Natural Born Trouble (1998)
- Unexpected Mummy (1998)
- The Cowgirl and the Unexpected Wedding (1998)
- Natural Born Lawman (1998)
- The Unclaimed Baby (1999)
- The Cowboy and His Wayward Bride (1999)
- Suddenly, Annie's Father (1999)

=== Second Chance at Love ===
- A Kiss Away (1986)
- A Prince Among Men (1986)
- All For Love (1986)
- Two's Company (1987)
- Best Intentions (1987)
- Prince Charming Replies (1988)

=== This Time Forever ===
- Can't Say No (1988)
- One Touch of Moondust (1989)
- Next Time...Forever (1990)

=== Amanda Roberts ===
- Reckless (1989)
- Body and Soul (1989)
- Stolen Moments (1990)
- Ties That Bind (1991)
- Bank On It (1993)
- Hide and Seek (1993)
- Wages of Sin (1994)
- Deadly Obsession (1995)
- White Lightning (1995)

=== Molly DeWitt ===
- Hot Property (1992)
- Hot Secrets (1992)
- Hot Money (1993)
- Hot Schemes (1994)

=== Vows ===
- Love (1992)
- Honor (1992)
- Cherish (1992)
- Kate's Vow (1993)
- A Daring Vow (1993)
- A Vow to Love (1994)

=== Bridal Path ===
- A Ranch for Sara (1997)
- Ashley's Rebel (1997)
- Danielle's Daddy Factor (1997)

=== And Baby Makes Three: The Delacourts of Texas ===
- The Cowboy and the New Year's Baby (1999)
- Dylan and the Baby Doctor (2000)
- The Pint-sized Secret (2000)
- Marrying a Delacourt (2000)
- The Delacourt Scandal (2000)

=== Woman's Way ===
- A Love Beyond Words (2001)

=== Calamity Janes ===
- Do You Take This Rebel? (2001)
- Courting the Enemy (2001)
- To Catch a Thief (2001)
- The Calamity Janes (2001)
- Wrangling the Redhead (2001)

=== Trinity Harbor ===
- About That Man (2001)
- Ask Anyone (2002)
- Along Came Trouble (2002)

=== Devaneys ===
- Ryan's Place (2002)
- Sean's Reckoning (2002)
- Michael's Discovery (2003)
- Patrick's Destiny (2003)
- Daniel's Desire (2003)

=== Million-Dollar Destinies ===
- Isn't It Rich? (2004)
- Priceless (2004)
- Treasured (2004)
- Destiny Unleashed (2004)

=== Charleston Trilogy ===
- The Backup Plan (2005)
- Flirting with Disaster (2005)
- Waking Up in Charleston (2006)

=== Rose Cottage Sisters ===
- Three Down the Aisle (2005)
- What's Cooking (2005)
- The Laws of Attraction (2005)
- For the Love of Pete (2005)
- Home at Rose Cottage (2010)- reissue collects Three Down the Aisle & What's Cooking in one volume
- Return to Rose Cottage (2010)- reissue collects The Laws of Attraction & For the Love of Pete in one volume

=== Sweet Magnolias ===
- Stealing Home (2007)
- A Slice of Heaven (2007)
- Feels Like Family (2007)
- Welcome to Serenity (2008)
- Home in Carolina (2010)
- Sweet Tea at Sunrise (2010)
- Honeysuckle Summer (2010)
- Midnight Promises (2012)
- Catching Fireflies (2012)
- Where Azaleas Bloom (2012)
- Swan Point (July 29, 2014)

=== Seaview Key ===
- Seaview Inn (2008)
- Home to Seaview Key (January 28, 2014)

=== Chesapeake Shores ===
- The Inn at Eagle Point (2009)
- Flowers on Main (2009)
- Harbor Lights (2009)
- A Chesapeake Shores Christmas (2010)
- Driftwood Cottage (2011)
- Moonlight Cove (2011)
- Beach Lane (2011)
- An O'Brien Family Christmas (2011)
- The Summer Garden (2012)
- A Seaside Christmas (2013)
- The Christmas Bouquet (10/07/2014)
- Dogwood Hill (December 30, 2014)
- Willow Brook Road (2015)
- Lilac Lane (2017)

=== Ocean Breeze ===
- Sand Castle Bay (2013)
- Wind Chime Point (2013)
- Sea Glass Island (2013)

=== Omnibuses ===
- So This Is Christmas (2004) (with Leanne Banks, Beverly Barton and Margot Early)
- Dashing Through the Mall (2006) (with Darlene Gardner and Holly Jacobs)
- That Holiday Feeling (2009) (with Debbie Macomber and Robyn Carr)
- Summer Brides (2010) (with Susan Mallery and Susan Wiggs)

=== Other books ===
- The Sweet Magnolias' Cookbook (2012)
