= Brendan Penny =

Canadian actor

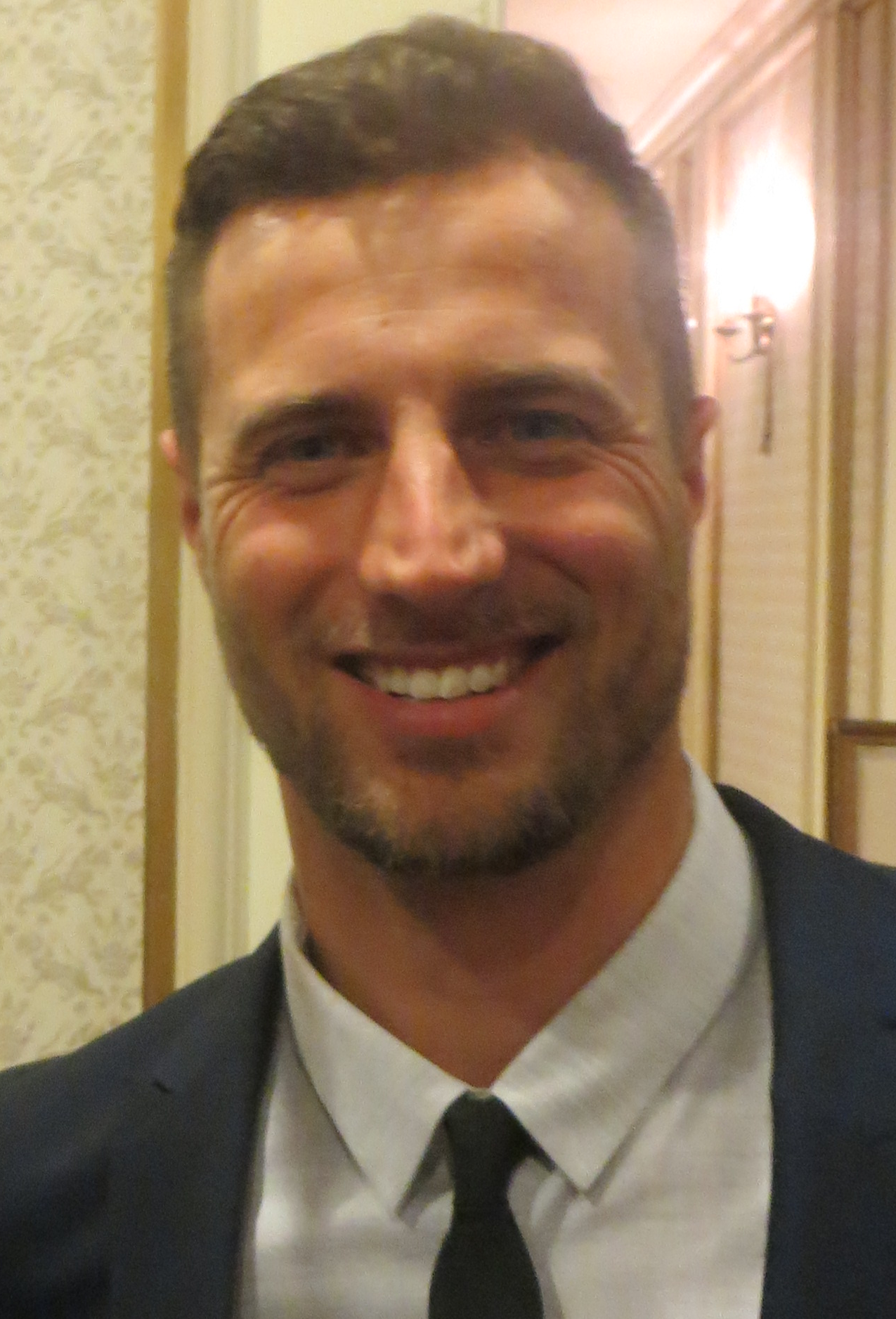
- Penny at the 2014 Leo Awards
- Born: Brendan James Penny; November 9, 1978 (age 47); Ottawa, Ontario, Canada
- Occupation: Actor
- Years active: 2003–present
- Children: 2

Brendan James Penny (born November 9, 1978) is a Canadian film and television actor who first became well known to TV audiences as A.J. Varland in the first season of Whistler that aired in Canada from 2006 to 2008. He is perhaps best known as Detective Brian Lucas in Motive, a Canadian crime drama centred on a team of Vancouver homicide detectives, also starring Kristin Lehman, Louis Ferreira and Lauren Holly, which aired from 2013 to 2016. Brendan currently stars as Kevin O'Brien in the Hallmark Channel family drama series Chesapeake Shores, which premiered on August 14, 2016. He has also been the hero of a number of Hallmark originals.

== Early life and his career ==
Penny was born November 9, 1978, in Ottawa, Ontario, and grew up in both Ottawa and London. He attended Fanshawe College, London, Ontario, earning a BS in Accounting. He later attended the Lyric School of Acting, in Vancouver, British Columbia, where he had moved in 2002 to pursue an acting career. After several television roles, he became known to audiences for playing A.J. Varland in Whistler.

Penny has had various roles in television series such as Kyle XY and Supernatural. His first lead role was in Whistler. His roles include shows such as Diamonds, Smallville, Blade: The Series, and The L Word. Penny starred in The Assistants and appeared as Sean in I Love You, Beth Cooper. In a main cast role, he played Detective Brian Lucas in Motive.

== Filmography ==
=== Film ===
Film
| Year | Film | Role | Other notes |
|---|---|---|---|
| 2005 | When Jesse Was Born | Spanky | |
| 2005 | LTD. | Pete | Main role |
| 2006 | John Tucker Must Die | Teammate #1 | Canada: French title: John Tucker doit mourir |
| 2008 | The Ex-Convict's Guide to Surviving House Arrest | Parole Officer 3 | |
| 2008 | Poison Ivy: The Secret Society | Will Mitchell | Television movie |
| 2008 | Thomas Kinkade's Home for Christmas | Eugene | |
| 2009 | I Love You, Beth Cooper | Sean | Supporting role |
| 2009 | Held Hostage | Chris Clark/Money One | Television movie |

=== Television ===
Television
| Year | Series | Role | Other notes |
|---|---|---|---|
| 2003 | Jake 2.0 | Rollerblader | Episode: "Training Day" |
| 2006-2012 | Supernatural | Steve/Demon | "Scarecrow" (Season 1, Episode 11) as Steve, "Survival of the Fittest" (Season 7, Episode 23) as Demon |
| 2005–2006 | The L Word | Coleman Alt/Young PA | 3 episodes; 2 as Coleman Alt, 1 as Young PA |
| 2006 | Kyle XY | Wes | "Memory Serves" (Season 1, Episode 8) |
| 2006 | Whistler | A.J. Varland | 13 episodes, series regular in season 1 |
| 2006 | Blade: The Series | Zed | "Hunters" (Season 1, Episode 10) |
| 2006 | Smallville | Wagner | "Sneeze" (Season 6, Episode 2) |
| 2008 | Stargate: Atlantis | Wraith technician/Male Wraith | 2 episodes; 1 as Wraith technician, 1 as Male Wraith |
| 2008 | Betsy's Kindergarten Adventures | Ben | |
| 2008–2009 | Diamonds | Tom Anderson | "Part One" (Season 1, Episode 1) "Part Two" (Season 1, Episode 2) |
| 2009–2010 | The Assistants | Danny Newell | Lead role |
| 2013–2016 | Motive | Detective Brian Lucas | Supporting role |
| 2014 | Heavenly Match | Reverend David Swenson | Up TV television movie |
| 2014 | Along Came a Nanny | Dean Bartons | Hallmark Movies & Mysteries Channel TV Movie |
| 2015 | The Gourmet Detective: A Healthy Place to Die | Eric | Hallmark Movies & Mysteries Channel TV Movie |
| 2015 | Tis The Season for Love | Dean | Hallmark Channel TV movie |
| 2016–2019 | In the Vineyard series | Nate DeLuca | Hallmark Channel TV movie |
| 2016–2022 | Chesapeake Shores | Kevin O'Brien | Main role |
| 2017 | A Dash of Love | Paul Dellucci | Hallmark Channel TV Movie |
| 2017 | Magical Christmas Ornaments | Nate | Hallmark Movies & Mysteries TV Movie |
| 2018 | Pride, Prejudice, and Mistletoe | Luke | Hallmark Channel TV movie |
| 2019 | Easter Under Wraps | Bryan | Hallmark Channel TV movie |
| 2019 | BH90210 | Wyatt Jackson | "The Photo Shoot" (Season 1, Episode 3) "The Table Read" (Season 1, Episode 4) "Picture's Up" (Season 1, Episode 5) "The Long Wait" (Season 1, Episode 6) |
| 2020 | The Secret Ingredient | Andrew York | Hallmark Channel TV movie |
| 2020 | A Little Christmas Charm | Greg Matthews | Hallmark Movies & Mysteries Channel TV Movie |
| 2021 | Beverly Hills Wedding | Cory | Hallmark Channel TV Movie |
| 2021 | Time for Them to Come Home for Christmas | Paul | Hallmark Movies & Mysteries Channel TV Movie |
| 2022 | In Merry Measure | Adam | Hallmark Channel TV Movie |
| 2023 | The Wedding Cottage | Evan Stanford | Hallmark Channel TV Movie |
| 2023 | A Season for Family | Paul | Hallmark Channel TV Movie |
| 2024 | Family Practice Mysteries: Coming Home | Jack | Hallmark Mystery TV Movie |
| 2024 | A Novel Noel | Sawyer | Hallmark Channel TV Movie |
| 2026 | Texas Two-Step | Luke | Hallmark Channel TV Movie |

== Awards and nominations ==
| Year | Award | Result | Category | Nominated work | Refs |
|---|---|---|---|---|---|
| 2007 | Leo Award | Nominated | Best Lead Performance by a Male in a Dramatic Series | Whistler | |
| 2017 | Leo Award | Nominated | Best Supporting Performance by a Male in a Dramatic Series | Motive | |
