= Laci J. Mailey =

Canadian actress

- Born: Fruitvale, British Columbia, Canada
- Occupation: Actress
- Years active: 2011–present
- Spouse: Steve Bradley
- Children: 2

Laci J. Mailey is a Canadian actress known mostly for her work on television. She first became known for her recurring role on Falling Skies. She had a recurring role in the second season of the CBC Television series The Romeo Section and appeared as Jess O'Brien in the Hallmark Channel family drama Chesapeake Shores.

== Personal ==
Laci Mailey grew up in British Columbia as the youngest child of her family. She attended Vancouver Film School straight out of high school, and has also studied in New York City and Los Angeles.

== Filmography ==
Below is a selected filmography for Laci J. Mailey, sometimes credited as just Laci Mailey.

Year	Title	Role	Notes
2011	Hunt for the I-5 Killer	Samantha Adams	TV movie
2011	Good Morning, Killer	Bridget	TV movie
2011	Captain Starship	Vera	
2012	The Pregnancy Project	Tyra	TV movie
2012	Fairly Legal	Ashley Woods	Episode: "Ripple of Hope"
2012	Notes from the Heart Healer	Violet Johnson	TV movie
2012	Arrow	Margo	Episode: "Pilot"
2012	Ring of Fire (TV miniseries)	Katie Preston	Episode: "Night 2"
2012–2013	Emily Owens, M.D.	Kylie	3 episodes (1 uncredited)
2013	Signed, Sealed, Delivered	Kelly	Episode: "Pilot"
2013	Evil Feed	Jenny	
2014	Motive	Carly Morgan	Episode: "Angels with Dirty Faces"
2014	Continuum	Christine Dillon	2 episodes
2012–2014	Falling Skies	Jeanne Weaver	12 episodes
2014	The Dorm	Juliet Bloom	TV movie
2012–2015	Supernatural	Deputy Jenna Nickerson/Emily	3 episodes (2 different roles)
2016	iZombie	Miss Schaefer	Episode: "The Whopper"
2016	The Magicians	Fen	Episode: "Have You Brought Me Little Cakes"
2016	Newlywed and Dead	Ashley Brown	TV movie
2016	The Romeo Section	Sonya	7 episodes
2016–2022	Chesapeake Shores	Jess O'Brien	Main role
TBA	Mary Jane Remembers (short film)	Mary Jane	Post-production
