= Panic in the Skies! =

1996 American television film

- Genre: Drama
- Teleplay by: Robert Hamilton
- Story by: Rick Rosner; Robert Hamilton
- Directed by: Paul Ziller
- Starring: Kate Jackson; Ed Marinaro; Erik Estrada
- Music by: Todd Hayen
- Country of origin: United States
- Original language: English

Production
- Executive producers: Paul Colichman; Mark R. Harris; Stephen P. Jarchow; Rick Rosner
- Producers: Dan Paulson; Rosanne Milliken; James Shavick
- Production location: Vancouver
- Cinematography: Rod Parkhurst
- Editors: Jeffrey Reiner; David B. Thompson
- Production companies: Daniel L. Paulson Productions; Libra Pictures; MTM Enterprises (in association with Regent Entertainment, Rosner Television and Shavick Entertainment); International Family Entertainment, Inc.

Original release
- Network: The Family Channel
- Release: October 13, 1996

Panic in the Skies! is a 1996 American made-for television disaster film that is directed by Paul Ziller and was premiered on The Family Channel on October 13, 1996. The film stars Kate Jackson, Ed Marinaro and Erik Estrada.

== Plot ==
During take-off for a flight to Europe, Royce Air International Flight 115 (a Boeing 747-200 flying from New York to London) is struck by lightning. Although the flight continues, the lightning strike has killed the flight crew and disabled the radio communications to the ground. Laurie Ann Pickett, the senior flight attendant, enlists the aid of passenger Brett Young, and together, they determine that the autopilot can bring the aircraft in for a landing.

The autopilot that they rely on, begins to malfunction, homing in on airfield transponders at random, even airports that are too small to accommodate the large jetliner. Both Laurie and Brett realize they may have to find a way to land the aircraft by themselves. Veering to a completely new heading, the airliner turns from its flightpath over the Atlantic Ocean to fly to the Pacific Coast of North America. A small sub-plot, though not relevant to the malfunctioning autopilot, is a Rottweiler that broke free in the cargo hold and becomes a small menace to the passengers. The dog is eventually befriended and calmed down, as it was only aggravated due to stress.

On the ground, FAA Air Traffic Control officials who have lost radio contact with the 747, start a debate as to when the aircraft should be shot down to prevent a more disastrous crash in a heavily populated area. Tensions begin to come to a head on board the stricken airliner, with a landing at Vancouver, British Columbia, becoming their only option.

== Cast ==
- Kate Jackson as Laurie Ann Pickett
- Ed Marinaro as Brett Young
- Erik Estrada as Ethan Walker
- Maureen McCormick as Flight Attendant
- Billy Warlock as F.A. Matt Eisenhauer
- Robert Guillaume as Rob Barnes
- Marilyn Norry as Donna Preston
- Howard Dell as Charles Buckman (credited as Howard G.H. Dell)
- Robert Maloney as passenger
- Brandy Ledford as F.A. Charlene Davis
- Kehli O'Byrne as Tukey, Walker's Assistant
- Michael Buie as Darryl (credited as Mike Buie)
- Ken Camroux as Derek Green
- Marc Baur as Ed Handler
- Brett Stone as Lydia Chambers
- Michael Gelbart as Joel Rose

== Production ==
Principal photography on Panic in the Skies took place in Vancouver, British Columbia.

== Reception ==
While not reviewed by critics in mainstream media, Panic in the Skies did garner some interest from internet bloggers and other film critics. Film reviewer Sergio Ortega noted the "unfortunately bad movie ...", was filled with continuity and "unbelievable" aerial errors on the Boeing 747.

A contemporary review in The Vindicator, however, found the premise was not "so far-fetched".

The French website Mediafilm noted, "A film gathering all the clichés of the genre. Unconvincing direction. Routine acting."
