= Mile High (novel) =

Novel by Richard Condon

- First edition
- Author: Richard Condon
- Language: English
- Published: 1969
- Publisher: Dial Press
- Publication place: United States

Mile High was the eighth book by the American satirist and political novelist Richard Condon, first published by Dial Press in 1969. Internationally famous at the time of its publication, primarily because of his 1959 Manchurian Candidate, Condon had begun to lose the respect of critics with the publication of his last few books and the one-time, so-called Condon Cult was mostly a thing of the past. Like his fifth book, An Infinity of Mirrors, Mile High is a consciously ambitious work, primarily concerned with the establishment of Prohibition in the United States, and Condon researched it thoroughly. The first two-thirds of the book, in fact, reads as much like a lively history of New York City gangsterism from the mid-18th century through 1930 as it does a novel.

Mile High is a three-generational story, beginning with Paddy West, a penniless, totally amoral immigrant from Ireland who through shrewdness and brutality makes himself into the most powerful political boss in New York City; with Paddy's death in 1911 as a Tammany Hall leader, his even shrewder and more brutal son, Edward Courance West, becomes the center of the story, as, at age 20, he conceives, full-blown, a scheme for imposing Prohibition on the United States—purely as a means of making himself an unsurpassed fortune; and finally, in 1958, with Eddie West now the richest man in the world, but also criminally insane, the story shifts to his second son, Walter, a non-criminal architect, and his beautiful new black wife—a woman that the murderous racist Eddie West intends to torture and kill. The book is divided into three parts: "The Minotaur" (the longest); "Theseus and Wife"; and "The Labyrinth".

It was published within a few months of a somewhat similar novel about multi-generational New York gangsters, The Godfather, by a relatively unknown author, Mario Puzo. Puzo and his book went on to worldwide renown, and while Mile High was received reasonably well, it did little to enhance Condon's reputation. This would have to wait a further two decades for his quartet of novels about the Prizzi family and its Hollywood adaptation, Prizzi's Honor.

== Theme ==
In Mile High, the basic theme of all 26 of Condon's books is summed up in a single angry cri de coeur:

Prohibition fused the amateurism and catch-as-catch-can national tendencies of the early days of the republic with a more modern, highly organized lust for violence and the quick buck. It fused the need to massacre twelve hundred thousand American Indians and ten million American buffalo, the lynching bees, the draft riots, bread riots, gold riots and race riots, the constant wars, the largest rats in the biggest slums, boxing and football, the loudest music, the most strident and exploitative press with the entire wonderful promise of tomorrow and tomorrow, always dragging the great nation downward into greater violence and more unnecessary deaths, into newer and more positive celebration of nonlife, all so that the savage, simple-minded people might be educated into greater frenzies of understanding that power and money are the only desirable objects for this life.

== Critical reception ==
Cover of the first hardback edition, published by Dial Press in 1969.

Both Time magazine and The New York Times devoted long, fairly favorable reviews to the book, although the Times was clearly more impressed by it than the anonymous Time magazine critic. Using a phrase of Condon's about what another character thinks Eddie West looks like as a young man, "a fish cake with a mustache", as the title of its review, the Time review recognizes many of Condon's talents in the book but also points out numerous faults:

The hideous possibility exists that Richard Condon has committed allegory. This saddening and unlikely conclusion is what remains after the reader has discarded all ordinary explanations for Mile High. The fine, demented gleam in Condon's eye has become a glitter, like that of a health-bar sign observed through the bottom of a celery-tonic bottle....

Condon's great and nourishing strength has always been his mania for mania. The mushy midsection of the human-behavior range has no interest for him, and ordinary psychosis not much more. What grips his imagination, and shakes it till splendid words fall out, is the tic of a human bomb....

Mile High at first seems a normal Condon fancy.... Eddie West, the son of an Irish immigrant, brings about Prohibition singlehanded. His reason for doing so is that Prohibition will provide business opportunities. This is instantly understood by "the 18 greediest, the seven most hypocritical and the five wealthiest families in the country" to whom he goes for financing....

This should be daft, glorious stuff, and West ought to lurch into life as a monstrously American folk villain, the match of such folk heroes as Paul Bunyan and Davy Crockett. If Minnesota's lakes are the hoof-prints of Bunyan's blue ox, why can't Warren Harding, Al Capone and Joseph McCarthy be the droppings from Eddie West's cigar?

...They might be, except that Condon loses his balance and—odd for him—goes off the shallow end. For the first time in eight novels, he wavers from his delightful obsession that maniacal rigidity is civilization's main motivating force and therefore the only human quirk worth a novelist's attention....

Eddie West dies of Condon's sermonizing. The last half of the book develops a subplot involving West's compulsion to murder Negro women (his mother, who deserted him, was a very dark-skinned Sicilian). It is here that the dreary suspicion of allegory crosses the reader's mind. It may not be true that West is meant to stand for corrupt America, and the Negro women for America's blacks, but the book has been so mishandled by this point that no reader can be sure.

Condon just cannot be all bad, try as he will. Mile High contains at least one phrase that will outlast the century. Someone's face is described as resembling "a fish cake with a mustache." Condon should discard the rest of the book and rebuild on this foundation.

At the New York Times, Pete Hamill, who has since had a long career as a journalist, columnist, and novelist, was favorably impressed by it except, perhaps, as a work of fiction.

For some years now, Richard Condon... has been one of our supreme entertainers, a verbal tap-dancer whose ambitions usually have been limited to bedazzlement, fantasy and dark laughter. For the moment, he has abandoned vaudeville for a more serious stage. The result is this savage novel about the corruption of modern America....

According to "Mile High," it is not the Mafia that is moving into business; Condon's thesis is that the Mafia was the tool of "legitimate" business from the beginning, that the heroin pumped into our children's arms has been sent there by respectable American businessmen....

The plot becomes more operatic as it goes along. One of the large weaknesses of the book, as fiction, is that we never feel anything about Eddie West himself, not even loathing. But Condon makes his opera believable, because he is the best of the practitioners of what might be called the New Novelism... Condon applies a dense web of facts to his fiction. Eddie West walks corridors with Warren Harding; he meets frequently with Paul Kelly, one of the actual bosses of the early Mafia; he talks with Al Capone and Johnnie Torrio. Condon has a mania for absolute detail that reminds you frequently of Ian Fleming....

Despite the cult that has grown up around Condon, he is not really a great novelist, and certainly makes no pretensions about the value of his work. But as a practitioner of the fiction of information, no one else comes close to him....

If much of the book remains thesis and exposition (and thus fails as fiction), the thesis itself is terrifying. He has written, with brilliance and style, an indictment that forgives nothing.

== Title ==
The title, for only the second time in Condon's eight novels, is not derived from a fictitious Keener's Manual mentioned in most of his earlier novels. Only his second, and most famous work, The Manchurian Candidate, had not previously used doggerel from the Manual as a title source.

== Typical Condon quirks and characteristics ==
=== Metaphors and similes ===
The novel offers many fine examples of the traits and stylistic tricks that were typical of all of Condon's works, among them, as the playwright George Axelrod once put it, "the sheer gusto of the prose, the madness of his similies, the lunacy of his metaphors". A selection, taken almost at random: from Mile High:

- "His anger was mounting like the white smoke of the papal election signal"—page 34
- "Her dank black hair looked as though it had been arranged with an egg beater"—page 36
- "She paddled on her back in a limpid pool of wistful fantasies"—page 37
- "He was seventy-nine years old and might have lived to be ninety had he remembered Aaron Burr and not lost his temper just for the sake of slugging a horse. Just as Burr might have been President had he not lost his temper and shot Alexander Hamilton"—page 44

=== Food ===
As one Condon book succeeded another, he more and more described elaborate food preparations, generally from French cuisine, and gave long, detailed menus for what his characters ate at various meals. In Mile High, the abstemious Paddy West has a businessman's lunch at the famous Delmonico's at which he drinks selzer water but eats dines on "caviar, tortue verte au sherry, filets de sole à la Nantua, suprême de volaille aux truffes fraîches, haricot verts à la creme, pommes de terre à la parisienne, parfait de fois gras à la gelée de porto, asperges vertes, bombe Montmorency and friandises."—page 47

=== Real-life names ===
Condon enjoyed peppering his books with generally brief allusions to real-life acquaintances. In Mile High, there is the first mention of the novelist Robert Keifetz, as "the Keifetz Prize," on page 263, first mention of Keifetz.

Also appearing is another of Condon's regulars, Dr. Abraham Weiler, page 262. In real life Weiler was a film critic for the New York Times.

F. Marx Heller of the law firm Pick, Heller & O'Connell appears on page 61 and plays a minor role for a few chapters. F.M. Heller, or some variation thereof, is mentioned in all 26 of Condon's novels. The real-life Heller was a television director in New York City who eventually moved to a house on Rockrimmon Road in Stamford, Connecticut. "I flew in straight from an all-night party at Rockrimmon," says a character in Mile High on page 313, the first of what would become recurring mentions of Rockrimmon in future Condon books.

== Possible errors ==
In spite of Condon's thorough research and mania for elaborate details, long lists of trivia, and the apparent authenticity of all the purported facts that are cited in his books, there are at least two probable errors in Mile High. On page 93 an Italian prostitute sits in a "green rayon wrapper" awaiting her client at an unspecified date but probably around 1912 to 1915. This is possible but most unlikely: rayon had been invented 50 years earlier but its development was troubled and it was not until after World War I that it had been refined enough to become an everyday article of clothing. A more glaring error is the statement on page 41 that Eddie West receives an autographed photograph from William McKinley in the White House dated January 27, 1904. McKinley, of course, was assassinated in 1901 and Theodore Roosevelt was in the White House in 1904. Given the highly improbable premise of the book that a single man, Eddie West, invented and implemented Prohibition, it is possible that the wrong date is intentional and that Condon is warning the astute reader that the events of Mile High take place in an alternative universe in which McKinley was not assassinated.
