= Any God Will Do =

Novel by Richard Condon

Cover of the 1966 Random House first edition.

Any God Will Do is the sixth book by the American satirist and political novelist Richard Condon, first published by Random House in 1966. After the grimness of his previous book, An Infinity of Mirrors, it was a return to his more usual light-heartedness, as displayed in works such A Talent for Loving. Although its theme is madness, unusually for Condon it has little of the almost gratuitous scenes of violence and sudden deaths of most of his books. Condon is primarily remembered for his 1959 novel, The Manchurian Candidate, and, many years later, a series of four novels about a family of New York gangsters named Prizzi.

== Plot ==
The story takes place from 1918 to 1922 in New York City, Switzerland and London. Francis Vollmer, an orphan of unknown parentage, is raised by a wealthy New York banker and develops an overwhelming obsession with the notion that he is the offspring of noble parentage, possibly even an illicit union of Kaiser Wilhelm and Queen Mary. Flitting in and out of overt madness, he spends the course of the book trying to determine his parentage. Vollmer teaches himself to become a French chef of a professional level, and much of the book is concerned with the delights of the table.

== Critical reception ==
Time magazine was distinctly lukewarm about the book:

While there is meticulous method in [the protagonist's] madness, there is not nearly enough madness in the narrative methods of Richard Condon (The Manchurian Candidate). What the author intends is a black comedy on the peril of an obsessive delusion; what he achieves is a hybrid between bedroom-comedy pink and olive-drab boredom...

Writer Kurt Vonnegut, who in 1966 was far less known than Condon, was more favorably disposed about it in the New York Times:

The sixth novel by Richard Condon, an American, of course, seems very middle-European to me. I hear echoes of Friedrich Durrenmatt, Max Frisch, und so weiter-- and the theme, I take it, is the loss of identity by modern man. I might as well add the name of Thomas Mann, since a lot of the action takes place in a Swiss sanitarium, and since this is such a serious book (or have I been had again?) It is serious despite a plot rigged along the lines of low comedy. What could be more middle-European than that?

The best parts of the book are its celebrations of food....The poorest parts of the book are its characters. The leading man, as has been said, is hollow and is supposed to be hollow, and the supported players who put junk into him or take it out are cartoons....The book is an honorable failure-- a failure because it is boring, despite many game and clever efforts of the author's part to bring it to life. It is honorable because it has tried to say some big things without a trace of meretriciousness. Condon has not solved a technical problem which may well be insoluble: how to write interestingly about a man who is truly empty.

Eight years later Christopher Lehmann-Haupt, the regular book reviewer of the Times, began a long review of Condon's latest novel with a backward look at Any God Will Do:

I gave up bothering with Richard Condon's books about five novels ago when in Any God Will Do he led me all the way through his snobbish hero's search for royal forebears, only to reveal at the end that said hero was actually the offspring of dwarfs. It seemed to me that Mr. Condon was making his point through overkill, just as he had one in his previous novel, An Infinity of Mirrors, a one-dimensional attempt to exploit our revulsion with Nazism. The verve and cleverness that produced The Manchurian Candidate seemed drained.

Lehmann-Haupt went on to give a favorable review to Winter Kills.
