= Rossenarra House =

Country house in Ireland

Coordinates: 52.463202°N 7.307976°W

Rossenarra House is a country house situated in Rossenarra, Demesne, formerly Castlehale and Snugsborough, near Kilmoganny in County Kilkenny, Ireland. It is claimed in local lore to have been designed by the architect James Hoban, who was also responsible for designing the White House in Washington, D.C.

== History ==
=== 17th century (Castlehale) ===
Originally a stronghold of the Walsh of the Mountains clan, it was known as Castlehale, Castle Hoel or Castlehowel. In the 17th century, the Walshes took up arms against Oliver Cromwell and as a result in 1650, the castle was besieged and the survivors were executed. During the 19th century their remains were found when a road was constructed.

=== 19th century ===
The house was built between 1819 and 1824 in the Palladian style, commissioned by William Morris-Reade, the owner of a large estate of some 7,000 acres near Kilmoganny. The most likely designers were George R. Paine, who had worked in 1823 for Morris-Reade's relation, the 1st Baron Carew, or Miles Kearney of Piltown, whose widow Ellen sued Morris-Reade's widow for monies owed in 1850. The house passed to his second son Frederick Richard Morris-Reade, who was born in 1833 at Rossenarra but died as a pauper in the workhouse at Michelstown in County Cork in 1898.

In 1850 and again in 1852 the whole estate and house was offered for sale by the Incumbent Estates Courts due to bankruptcy following the "Great Hunger" with some 1,500 acres being bought by the Morris family.

=== 20th century ===
Between 1901 and 1903, it came into the possession of the McEnery family who had been tenants of the house and some 1,000-odd acres of the remaining Reade Estates. It was sold to them by the Morris Reade descendants of Frederick Richard Morris-Reade's elder brother who were resident in Canada and where they still live.

Sir John Lavery, the Irish artist celebrated for his portraits resided at Rossenarra during the last few years of his life and died there on 10 January 1941, having been cared for by his stepdaughter Alice McEnery, (née Trudeau) (1904-1991), daughter of his second wife Hazel Lavery.

The house was also for a time the home of the American author Richard Condon, who wrote The Manchurian Candidate and Prizzi's Honor. Condon lived in Rossenarra from 1971 until he returned to the United States in 1980. During this time, famous guests to the house included Mick Jagger and Frank Sinatra. The title of Condon's memoir, And Then We Moved to Rossenarra, published in 1973, refers to his time there. The most recent residents of the house were American tycoon Walter Griffith and his Irish-born wife, Christine.
