= The Ecstasy Business =

Book by Richard Condon

Cover of the first hardback edition, published by The Dial Press in 1967

The Ecstasy Business was the seventh book by the American satirist and political novelist Richard Condon, first published by The Dial Press in 1967. Told in the third person, it is the broadly comic story of Tynan Bryson, "the greatest film star of his generation", and his torturous relationship with the director Albert McCobb, a blatant caricature of Alfred Hitchcock, and with his tempestuous ex-wife, an Italian film star to whom he has been married three times.

Given his extensive background in the film industry and early-on established fame, primarily from his 1959 The Manchurian Candidate, it is somewhat surprising to be Condon's first Hollywood novel. Although satiric and sardonic in its depiction of the film business, it is so broadly drawn and implausible in its plotting and manner of telling that it is far more of a burlesque than Condon's previous books. Unlike most "Hollywood novels", in spite of its mockery of the subject, Condon appears to be writing more with affection than bitterness. It does, however, amply illustrate the recurring theme that drives all of Condon's novels: "Money was at the heart of all art, and the thought of it quickened his pulse and cleared his mind."

A biographical afterword says:

"For twenty-two years, Richard Condon labored as a theatrical producer and movie press agent, presumably to acquire the authentic details that permeate this novel. Among the moguls for whom he beat the drum were Cecile B. De Mille, Sam Goldwyn, Otto Preminger, Frank Sinatra, Sam Spiegel, Darryl Zanuck, Walt Disney, and Howard Hughes."

== Critical reception ==
The back cover of the first edition, with a portrait of Richard Condon

The first of two New York Times reviews called it a "fictional amusement park", beginning its review by:

It's a bird! It's a plane! No! It's The Ecstasy Business... by Richard Condon. Faster than a speeding bullet zooms this balled-up potpourri of movie clichés—extended to their limits and beyond by Mr. Condon's fevered imagination.

A longer review in the Sunday book section was somewhat more mixed:

Richard Condon, a cum laude graduate of the press agent's table at Lindy's, creates another of his Chinese-meal novels.... You feel hungry an hour later, but all those sweet and pungent sauces tantalize you right up to the fortune cookie. Break it open after 300 pages of spare ribs and it reads: Look out for funny Hollywood novels. The Condon cult knows that he is an earnest man using every weapon from brass knuckles to Sioux pogamoggans against his fictional adversaries. His novels would be merely in the Max Shulman gag class except for the fact that he is deadly serious about the pollution of our atmosphere by sham and hypocrisy....

[Condon] has momentarily forgotten Hollywood's first law: Scratch the tinsel and find the real tinsel beneath. Yet Condon is always the working entertainer. Even with a flop, he follows the Henry James dictum that the novel "amounts to never forgetting, by any lapse, that the thing is under a special obligation to be amusing."

Time magazine gave the book a quite favorable review:

Hollywood is beyond parody. Almost anything said or written about it, no matter how absurd, somehow, somewhere, some time comes close to the truth. Author Richard Condon... has tried to defy that basic Hollywood tenet by inventing a story so preposterous that it cannot possibly seem real. He has only partly succeeded.

The plot is hallucinogenic, the characters are monstrous, and the style is Beverly Hills baroque. Yet Condon's grotesque farce is often merely the truth as seen in the wobbles of an amusement-park mirror. The book, which drifted past most critics and customers recently without creating much of a stir, is not on a par with the mad master's Manchurian Candidate. But in its own way, it deserves a small place on the shelf that includes Nathanael West and S.J. Perelman.

Condon's hero is Tynan Bryson, a Welsh movie star—an obvious fiction, since there is no such thing as a Welsh movie star. Tyson has had only one failure in his 46 pictures (a Hungarian director persuaded him to portray Thomas Jefferson as Richard Nixon might have played him).... Suspense survives for a time amid the farce, then separates like fragments from a grenade. What Condon fans will enjoy are his extravagant prose arias, including the account of a typical McCobb breakfast. For rhapsodic and inventive list making* it is unequaled by anything since the Glass family's medicine cabinet in Franny and Zooey.... Durham bacon cake, caudle, flummery, ale jelly, Rissered haddie, Huntingdon fidget, Bucks bacon badger, star-gazey pie, slapjack, Bedfordshire clanger, Hindle wakes, bockings, jugged rabbit, Somerset rook pie, bog star, jellied eels, Burlington whimsey, pigs' pettitoes, Kingdom of Fife, limpet stovies, dressmaker tripe, Gooseberry Fool.

== Title ==
The title, as is the case in six of Condon's first seven books, is derived from the last line of a typical bit of Condonian doggerel that supposedly comes from a fictitious Keener's Manual mentioned in many of his earlier novels:

Let us go down to the peep show,
For a taste of life and sex to see,
Let us go down to that place of dreams,
For a peek at the business of ecstasy.

The verse is found in only one place, as an epigraph on a blank page four pages after the title page and two pages before the beginning of the text.

== Typical Condon quirks and characteristics ==
Unusual for a Condon work, it does not contain innumerable inventive and preposterous similes and metaphors. A few are scattered about the book, such as, "She had a voice like a tuba encased in Orson Welles's stomach."

Condon does, however, apply his imagination to such fancies as a murder device intended for the hero but inadvertently triggered by his agent:

"The police investigation uncovered a diabolical mechanism which had been attached to the [diving] board. It was a launching device used to fly small planes off Fujihawa-type submarines in World War Two. If [the agent] had not weighed so much—about two forty-six—if he had weighed one hundred and eighty pounds as I do, he would have been propelled approximately one hundred and sixty-three feet up and dropped squarely on the stone roof of the palazzo, two hundred and ninety feet away."
