= Winter Kills =

Winter Kills may refer to:

- Winter Kills (novel), a 1974 novel by Richard Condon
  - Winter Kills (film), a 1979 film written and directed by William Richert, based on the novel
- Winter Kills (album), a 2013 album by DevilDriver.
- "Winter Kills" (American Horror Story), an episode of American Horror Story
- "Winter Kills", a song by Yazoo from the album Upstairs at Eric's
- Winter Kill 1974 American made-for-television mystery-thriller film
- Winterkill, cold winter deaths
