= A Talent for Loving =

A Talent for Loving may refer to:

- A Talent for Loving (novel), a 1961 novel by Richard Condon
- A Talent for Loving (film), a 1969 British-American comedy Western film, based on the novel
