= The Oldest Confession =

Novel by Richard Condon

- First edition cover
- Author: Richard Condon
- Language: English
- Publisher: Appleton-Century-Crofts
- Publication date: April 28, 1958
- Publication place: United States
- Media type: Print

The Oldest Confession is a 1958 novel, the first of twenty-five by the American political novelist and satirist Richard Condon. It was published by Appleton-Century-Crofts. The novel is a tragicomedy about the attempted theft of a masterpiece from a museum in Spain. It can be classified as a caper story or caper novel, a subset of crime novels. The book deals with issues of money, greed, ethics and morality. It was adapted into a film retitled The Happy Thieves.

== Title ==
The title is inspired, as many of Condon's quotes, from The Keener's Manual, the fictional book he had also written.

The epitaph to this first novel, which appears on the title page of the first American hardback edition, reads in its entirety:

The Oldest Confession
Is one of Need,
Half the need Love,
The other half Greed

== Characters ==
Main Characters

- James Bourne, an American in his middle 30s, is the protagonist and anti-hero of the book. He is created as a superficially likeable character: tall, physically powerful and intelligent. He reflects a recurring theme of the novel: the corruption of businessmen as immoral and criminal. Bourne worked at his father's insurance business; in that time driven to the conclusion that it is no crime to steal from already corrupt businessmen. Bourne repeats throughout the book at the only truly honest people are those who are criminal. Despite his depicted genuine love for his wife he is shown as self absorbed, callous and amoral.
- Dr. Victoriano Muñoz, Marqués de Villabra, a wealthy, half-mad Spanish nobleman obsessed by injustices supposedly done to his family a hundred years earlier by the painter Francisco de Goya. A clear caricature, he is obsessed with his moustache and carries a topaz cat named Montes. Despite his wealth, Muñoz spends the novel feeling cheated by Goya. While first appearing as a minor character, he ultimately is the villain and is described as the most important character as he sets the plot in motion and intrudes at key moments. Through his unwitting interventions, he causes a number of deaths of other characters leading Condon to write later:

"... Victoriano Munoz certainly deserved to die for what he had done in my first novel.... The admirable Duchess of Dos Cortes, who murdered him, was very religious, and I was her old deity, poor woman. She implored me for permission to kill him for his most heinous crimes against her, and I had to so rule."

Other Characters:

- Bourne's wife, Eve Lewis, a young American who has come to Paris and is skilled in languages, learnt through various lovers. After becoming Bourne's lover and criminal accomplice, she now travels with a large number of passports in various names.
- Jean Marie Calvert, the unequaled French copyist. He is a vital cog in Bourne's plan to steal the Dos de Mayo, but, ultimately panics, derailing the robbery and leading to his death.
- His wife, Lalu, only described as "Lalu looked like a nursery doll. Her voice was higher than a dog's whistle.... The sounds she made were like a well filled with drunken canaries."
- The Duchess of Dos Cortes and her lover:
- Cayetano Jiminez, the world's greatest matador.
- Homer Pickett, an absurd, compulsively talkative backwoods American congressman from downstate Illinois who is, improbably, the world's greatest authority on Spanish paintings.
- The congressman's drunken, and sexually frustrated, wife who has an addiction to absinthe.
- Lawyer Chern, a Swiss lawyer who makes a brief appearance before being killed by Bourne, who locks him for what is intended to be a few days into a Parisian cellar and then forgets about him.
- Various minor characters such as English gangsters, Spanish customs officials and lawyers, and employees of Bourne's hotel

== Plot ==
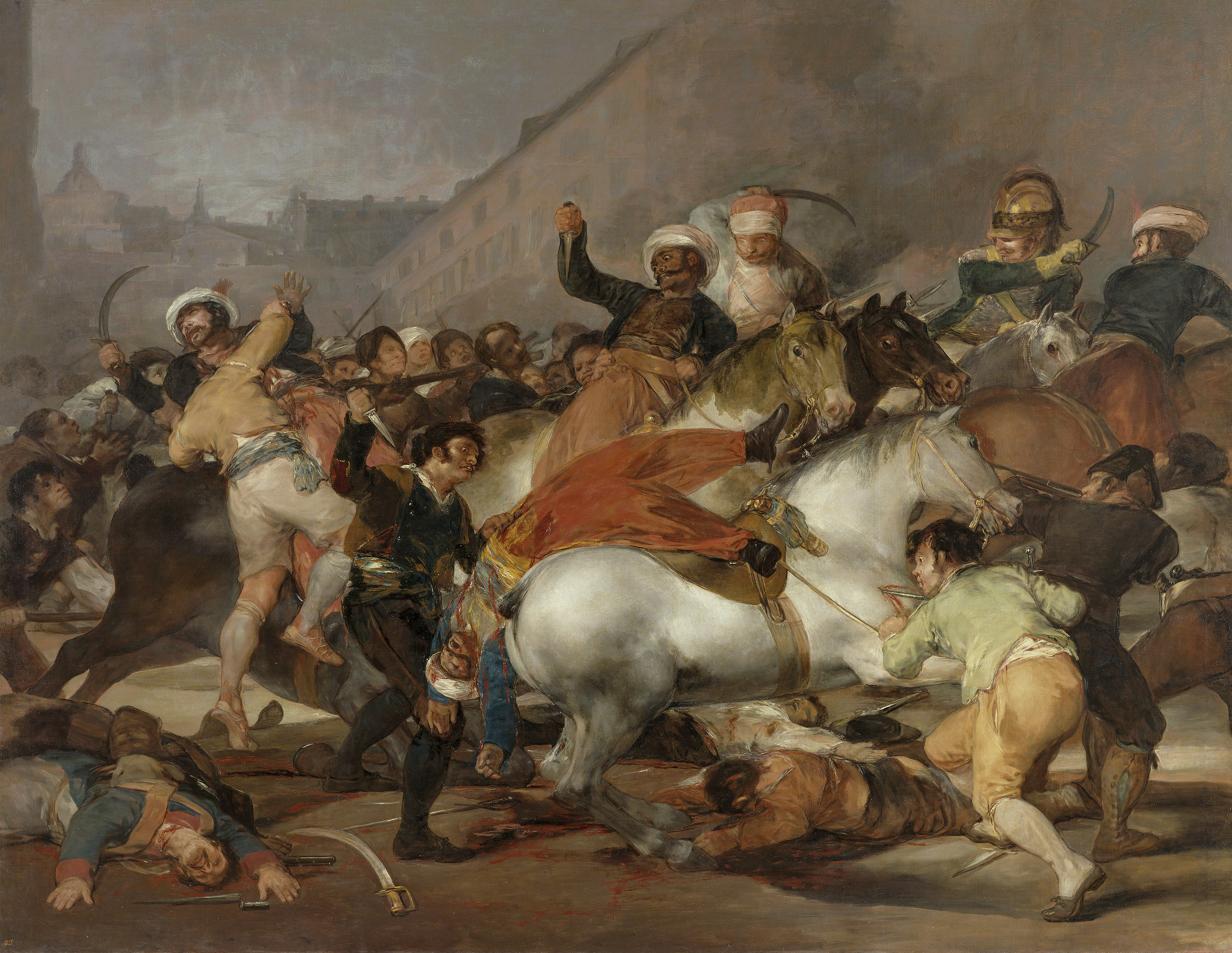
Goya's Dos de Mayo, the object of James Bourne's plot

The plot of The Oldest Confession follows Doña Blanca Conchita Hombria y Arias de Ochoa y Acebal, Marquesa de Vidal, Condesa de Ocho Pinas, Vizcondesa Ferri, Duquesa de Dos Cortes, a 29-year-old beauty who was married to an aged degenerate and becomes the wealthiest woman in Spain upon his death, and owner of the paintings inside her residence. The long-forgotten paintings are coveted by American criminal James Bourne, who regularly steals paintings across Spain from his hotel in Madrid. With every painting he replaces the original paintings with forgeries executed by Jean Marie Calvert, a Parisian artist who is the world's greatest copyist.

Painted in Paris, the reproductions are brought into Spain by Bourne's wife, an upper-class young American girl named Eve Lewis, who loves Bourne in spite of his criminality. Bourne is introduced, stealing three masterpiece paintings from his supposed friend, the Duchess of Dos Cortes, and arranges for his wife to smuggle them to Paris for a highly profitable sale. When she arrives in Paris, however, she discovers that the mailing tube in which the paintings were being carried is now empty. The book then focuses on the downward spiral of Bourne and his associates.

Bourne, though considering himself a master criminal, is tracked by others. Bourne is coerced by Dr Victor Muñoz into the seemingly impossible task of stealing one of the world most famous masterpieces, the Dos de Mayo (or Second of May or Charge of the Marmelukes) by Francisco de Goya, from its tightly guarded quarters in the national museum of Spain, the Prado.

Bourne, double crossed by Victor, is subsequently killed by the Duchess of Dos Cortes in revenge for the death of her lover, Jimenez. Jean and James are caught and arrested, both being sentenced to life for the theft.

== Concept and creation ==
In 1955, Condon, then 40 years old and a longtime New York publicist and Hollywood employee of various studios, was the publicity agent for The Pride and the Passion, a film starring Frank Sinatra and Sophia Loren being shot in Spain. As he writes in his memoir, And Then We Moved to Rossenarra, he was present at a scene being filmed in the ancient rectory of the Escorial, the massive palace and cathedral outside Madrid. The enormous lights needed to film the scene

"revealed dozens upon dozens of great masterpieces of paintings that had not been seen for centuries, hung frame touching frame—the work of Goya, Velasquez, the great Dutch masters, and the most gifted masters of the Italian Renaissance.... The idea of masterpieces of Spanish painting hanging in stone castles all over Spain, high and invisible in the darkness, stayed with me and gradually formed itself into a novel called The Oldest Confession....

Back in New York, Condon began turning his initial concept into a screenplay—until his wife pointed out, that he was writing it in the past tense instead of the present, which is obligatory for screenplays, and that it should be turned into a novel. Condon followed her advice and the book was published to favorable reviews not long afterwards.

=== Publication and the movies ===
Even before it was published in April 1958, twelve film companies had initiated talks about purchasing rights to it. In a brief mention in The New York Times about the forthcoming book, "Condon explained without divulging details of the plot, [the theme] 'Is one of need. Half the need, love. The other half, greed.'" The movie version was released in 1962 as The Happy Thieves, starring Rex Harrison and Rita Hayworth, and was dismissed by The New York Times as a "limp herring" of "the devastating first novel".

== Style and Condonian quirks ==
- The novel offers first glimpses of many of the traits and stylistic tricks that were typical of Condon's later novels, among them, as the playwright George Axelrod once put it, "the madness of his similies, the lunacy of his metaphors". A selection of these from the opening pages:

The duchess was ... a tribal yo-yo on a string eight hundred years long....

Bourne always sat uncommonly still ... a monument to his own nerves which bayed like bloodhounds at the moon of his ambition.

... the giant gestures of throwing the ball from the long baskets as Van Gogh might have tried to throw off despair only to have it bound back at him from some crazy new angle.

- Also making a debut was Condon's delight in creating long lists of madcap and strangely juxtaposed items such as:

... the duchess [inherited] the ownership of approximately eighteen per cent of the population of Spain inclusive with farms, mines, factories, breweries, houses, forests, rocks, vineyards and holdings in eleven countries of the world including shares in a major league baseball club in North America, an ice cream company in Mexico, quite a few diamonds in South Africa, a Chinese restaurant on Rue François 1er in Paris, a television tube factory in Manila, and in geisha houses in Nagasaki and Kobe.

- Most of Condon's novels feature brief appearances, or sometimes only off-stage mentions, of characters named after real-life friends of the author. In a number of books, for instance, a character named Keifetz appears, named apparently for Robert Keifetz, a New York City author who wrote a novel about a major league baseball player called The Sensation—that novel was dedicated to Condon. In The Oldest Confession, a character has lunch in a Paris bistro and briefly meets two people playing chess at the bar, "Buchwald and Nolan, newspaper and airline peons respectively". Buchwald is certainly Art Buchwald, the celebrated newspaper columnist and humorist, who, at the time of the book's publication, was still working for The International Herald-Tribune, which was published in Paris, where Condon had also lived during the 1950s. The identity of Nolan, however, remains a mystery.
- In spite of the admiring statement of the Times reviewer quoted earlier that "Condon's is a fully controlled job of writing rather than an ardent grope. Written throughout with painstaking grace, not one scene or description is ever thrown away," Condon does, however, occasionally slip into pretentious, emotionally overheated, prose, a trait that would characterise his latter works as well. Early in the book, for instance, in a paragraph discussing "criminality", in which, with typical Condon brio, he compares the kind of "infantile discipline" that a master criminal needs to that of a small boy "who will work to remember baseball batting averages back to Napoleon Lajoie", he goes on to write:

"It is greed with a social sense removed because what is there to be taken must be taken by the criminal consistent with his inner resources, eliminating envy, a much smaller sin."

- Also typical of later Condon works is his precise detailing of the peripheral deaths and injuries to innocent bystanders caused by some particularly careless or coldblooded act committed by one of the characters, sometimes by the book's sympathetically drawn protagonist. Dr. Muñoz of The Oldest Confession is far from sympathetic—he is repellent even—and when he sets out to create an "extraordinary diversion", one that will instantly have all of Madrid buzzing while Bourne carries out the actual theft of the Goya painting, he makes himself even more detestable. After carrying out the first step of the diversion demanded by Bourne:

The crowd rioted at the bull ring.... Two children and one woman were trampled to death; twenty-six persons were injured, nine seriously. Two men, seated sixty yards apart in separate sections of the plaza, had been pointed at as having thrown the knife but miraculously had been saved from the mob by courageous police.

- Finally, we have the first mentions of a phrase that is more closely associated with The Manchurian Candidate than this book and that may also have appeared in other works by Condon. On page 142 James Bourne is at his grandiloquent worst as he once again tries to justify his criminality to Eve: "I am you and you are me and what can we do for the salvation of each other?" Two hundred pages later, one broken woman tries to console another with an equally long-winded speech that ends with, "I am you and you are me and what have we done to each other?" A year later, with the publication of the book that was to make Condon famous, on a frontis page of The Manchurian Candidate, two separate epigraphs, one supposedly from the Standard Dictionary of Folklore, Mythology and Legend, and the other, shorter one, from The Keener's Manual: "I am you and you are me and what have we done to each other?"

== Critical appraisal ==
Gerald Walker, in the Sunday book review section of The New York Times of June 22, 1958, wrote a favorable review called "Urbane Insiders". It managed to completely avoid giving his readers much more than a cursory clue as to what the book was about. One of his paragraphs (omitted here) was devoted to another, earlier work by another author about art forgeries, but, aside from that hint, his review is little more than generalities. It was, nevertheless, a fine inaugural reception in a most important media outlet for a hitherto unknown 43-year-old author:

Unlike most other first novels, Richard Condon's is a fully controlled job of writing rather than an ardent grope. Written throughout with painstaking grace, not one scene or description is ever thrown away or treated in a commonplace manner. Everything is handled, and handled well, from the viewpoint of the cosmopolitan insider who knows everything there is to know about such urbane things as art critics, European customs inspectors, wire services, bullfights and fine food and drink.

And yet the one thing the author is unable to convey is any feeling of depth, of real mortality unfolding before the reader. The deterioration of James Bournes, Ivy League master criminal, is singularly unmoving even as one stunningly dramatic scene or ingenious plot-turn follows another....

If, the next time out, he can manage to open up and write more personally without marring his exceedingly refined sense of literary form, then we shall really be seeing a book. As things are now, no apologies are necessary to anyone for this is quite an impressive debut.

Charles Poore, however, writing two months earlier in the daily Times, contented himself with a long synopsis of the story, finding "... a murderous sort of zaniness to Mr. Condon's plot" and remarking that "With a technique that requires all surprises and revelations to be undermined by fresh surprises and revelations, Mr. Condon spins everyone deeper and deeper into the plot."

Time, the leading mid-brow American weekly for most of the 20th century, did not review The Oldest Confession. Over the next 30 years, however, they mentioned it at least six times, always favorably, and frequently as containing superior qualities that Condon's later novels generally failed to meet:

- In 1960 they called it "fine, mordant".
- In 1961 they wrote admiringly that, "A Condon novel has the sound and shape of a bagful of cats. In The Oldest Confession, The Manchurian Candidate and Some Angry Angel, Condon garnered fans with accounts, written in messianic exasperation, of criminal endeavor, fate's falling cornices, widespread venality...."
- In 1971 they cited the "foaming manias" of The Oldest Confession, and made the assessment that, "Condon was never a satirist: he was a riot in a satire factory. He raged at Western civilization and every last one of its works."
- In 1974, in yet another unfavorable review of his latest novel, they wrote: "His early books, The Oldest Confession, The Manchurian Candidate and A Talent for Loving, are among the maddest funny novels of the last couple of decades. They seemed to have been written by Mephistopheles, raucous with glee at the insane excesses of the human creature."
- In 1977 they grudgingly admitted that, for his latest novel, The Abandoned Woman, "Condon's style, which has seemed preachy and sodden in recent years, achieves some of the snap and malice that enlivened such earlier works as The Oldest Confession and The Manchurian Candidate."
- In 1988, 30 years after his inaugural novel, they wrote, in a review of the third Prizzi novel, "In Condon's mad early novels—The Oldest Confession, The Manchurian Candidate—marvelous characters seethed with venality and obsession."
