= 1985 Los Angeles Film Critics Association Awards =

Annual US film awards ceremony

11th LAFCA Awards
- Date: December 14, 1985

Highlights
- Best Picture: Brazil

The 11th Los Angeles Film Critics Association Awards were announced on 14 December 1985 and given on 23 January 1986.

== Winners ==
- Best Picture:
  - Brazil
  - Runner-up: Out of Africa
- Best Director:
  - Terry Gilliam – Brazil
  - Runner-up: Akira Kurosawa – Ran
- Best Actor:
  - William Hurt – Kiss of the Spider Woman
  - Runner-up: Jack Nicholson – Prizzi's Honor
- Best Actress:
  - Meryl Streep – Out of Africa
  - Runner-up: Whoopi Goldberg – The Color Purple
- Best Supporting Actor:
  - John Gielgud – Plenty and The Shooting Party
  - Runner-up: William Hickey – Prizzi's Honor
- Best Supporting Actress (tie):
  - Anjelica Huston – Prizzi's Honor
  - Runner-up: Oprah Winfrey – The Color Purple
- Best Screenplay:
  - Terry Gilliam, Charles McKeown and Tom Stoppard - Brazil
  - Runner-up: Richard Condon and Janet Roach – Prizzi's Honor
- Best Cinematography:
  - David Watkin – Out of Africa
- Best Music Score:
  - Toru Takemitsu – Ran
  - Runner-up: Mark Isham - Trouble in Mind
- Best Foreign Film (tie):
  - The Official Story (La historia oficial) • Argentina
  - Ran • Japan/France
- Experimental/Independent Film/Video Award:
  - Rosa von Praunheim – Horror Vacui
- New Generation Award:
  - Laura Dern
  - Runner-up: Whoopi Goldberg
- Career Achievement Award:
  - Akira Kurosawa
- Special Citation:
  - Claude Lanzmann - Shoah
