= Prizzi's Honor (novel) =

1982 crime novel by Richard Condon

Prizzi's Honor is a satirical crime novel by Richard Condon published in 1982. It is the first of four novels featuring the Prizzis, a powerful family of Mafiosi in New York City. In all four novels the protagonist is a top member of the family named Charlie Partanna. It was adapted into a successful film of the same name.

Prizzi's Honor was followed in 1986 by Prizzi's Family, which is a prequel story. Prizzi's Glory being the third volume. Chronologically, the events in Prizzi's Honor are followed by the story of Prizzi's Money, which was the fourth and final Prizzi novel published, and also Condon's last work.

== Plot summary ==
The opening lines of the New York Times review summarize the complexities of the novel:

CHARLEY PARTANNA, underboss of the Prizzi crime family, has a problem. He's just bumped off a traitor in Vegas who'd fleeced the organization to the tune of $720,000 - and now he's discovered that his new girlfriend, Irene, was the dead man's wife. As if that weren't enough of a headache, Charley's also learned that she's been augmenting her income as a tax consultant by working as a freelance hitter, and that she's now been offered a contract by a family rival to do the number on him. What a business for a woman! Charley grouses. This is a serious thing. We were going to get married. You think she decided what business? asks his father, Angelo, consigliere to the Prizzis. She's an American! She had a chance to win even more money so she grabbed it!

Complexity builds upon complexity, irony builds upon irony, murder follows murder, and tension mounts as the improbable story of the two married killers races to its climax.

== Condon's style ==
Condon attacked his targets, usually gangsters, financiers, and politicians, wholeheartedly but with a uniquely original style and wit that made almost any paragraph from one of his books instantly recognizable. Reviewing one of his works in the International Herald Tribune, the well-known playwright George Axelrod (The Seven-Year Itch, Will Success Spoil Rock Hunter), who had collaborated with Condon on the screenplay for the film adaptation of The Manchurian Candidate, wrote:

"The arrival of a new novel by Richard Condon is like an invitation to a party.... the sheer gusto of the prose, the madness of his similies, the lunacy of his metaphors, his infectious, almost child-like joy in composing complex sentences that go bang at the end in the manner of exploding cigars is both exhilarating and as exhausting as any good party ought to be."

In Prizzi's Honor Condon's normal exuberance is somewhat muted because the entire book is narrated through the viewpoints of the semi-literate underworld characters who populate it. Nevertheless, on the first page of the book, we have Don Corrado Prizzi, the 84-year-old leader of the family, attending a wedding:

He was asleep, but even in repose his face was as subtly distorted and burnished as that of a giant crown of thorns starfish predator. Every few moments both small, sharp eyes, as merry as ice cubes, would open, make a reading, then close again.

== Real-life names in the book ==
All of Condon's books have, to an unknown degree, the names of real people in them as characters, generally very minor or peripheral. The most common, which appears in most of his books, is some variation of Franklin M. Heller. The real-life Heller was a television director in New York City in the 1950s, '60s, and 70s, who initially lived on Long Island and then moved to a house on Rockrimmon Road in Stamford, Connecticut. In this book Marxie Heller plays a somewhat more important role than usual, being the husband of Charley's future wife, Irene, before being shot to death by Charley in the garage of Irene's Los Angeles home.

== Reception ==
The New York Times gave it a very favorable long review, comparing it to Condon's previously best-known book, The Manchurian Candidate:

Of course, Mr. Condon is an old pro at mixing satire and suspense. Twenty years ago, he began a novel with an outlandish comic premise: Since Joe McCarthy couldn't have done more for the Communists if he had been one himself, suppose he had been? His answer to that question, The Manchurian Candidate, the first of what has been a long string of best sellers for Mr. Condon, was one of the finest thrillers of recent times and perhaps the most darkly amusing look ever at the McCarthy era. Prizzi's Honor also involves a humorous variation on a real-life theme... Twenty years after The Manchurian Candidate, it's nice to know that Mr. Condon is still up to his sly tricks. In his case, at least, it's a pleasure that - as he tells us an old Sicilian proverb has it - The less things change, the more they remain the same.

Kirkus Review, however, was far less charitable. After a long synopsis of the plot, it concluded:

Believable? Not really. Hilarious? Now and then in the opening chapter--with the portrait of likable/dumb/lethal Charley and his reactions to Irene's secret life (""What a business for a woman!""). But all too soon the lovers' matter-of-fact murdering becomes sick instead of offbeat, while Condon's cheerful non-stop vulgarity shifts from gritty to gross. And, though intermittently inspired in its low-life linguistics, this rather slow-paced, loose-plotted farce/melodrama succeeds neither as dog-eat-dog black comedy nor as Mafioso thriller/romance.
