= The Happy Thieves =

1961 American crime/comedy-drama film by George Marshall

- Directed by: George Marshall
- Written by: John Gay
- Based on: The Oldest Confession by Richard Condon
- Starring: Rita Hayworth; Rex Harrison; Joseph Wiseman
- Cinematography: Paul Beeson
- Edited by: Oswald Hafenrichter
- Music by: Mario Nascimbene
- Distributed by: United Artists
- Release dates: December 20, 1961 (Chicago, Illinois); January 1962 (U.S.)
- Running time: 88 mins.
- Country: United States
- Language: English

The Happy Thieves is a 1961 American crime/comedy-drama film starring Rex Harrison and Rita Hayworth, and directed by George Marshall. The film is based on the novel The Oldest Confession by Richard Condon. The film was poorly received, with star Harrison later describing it as "absolute rubbish".

== Plot ==
A valuable painting belonging to Duchess Blanca is stolen at night from her castle in Spain by one of her houseguests, Jimmy Bourne, who replaces the original work with a duplicate. The debonair gentleman thief then passes the painting to his partner in crime, Eve Lewis. However, the artwork is subsequently stolen from them by a man acting on behalf of Dr. Victor Muñoz, the cousin of the duchess.

Eve wants to go straight, but Victor blackmails her and Jim, demanding that they steal a renowned painting (The Second of May 1808) by Francisco de Goya from the Prado Museum in Madrid. An exact copy of the painting is created by artist Jean Marie Calbert, and a switch is planned to take place during the farewell bullfight of a famous matador, Cayetano, whom the duchess intends to wed.

During the bullfight, Victor secretly shoots Cayetano in order to create a diversion that will assist the art theft. News of the matador's death spreads quickly across the city and distracts the guards at the Prado Museum, allowing Jim and Jean to begin switching the two large paintings. Jean suddenly leaves the room before they are finished, but Eve arrives in time to help Jim complete the switch before the guards return.

Later, Jean turns up and goes with Jim to the house of Victor, where they find him dead. They are then framed for this murder by the duchess, who had killed Victor to avenge the death of Cayetano. Using the stolen Goya painting as a bargaining chip, Jim negotiates with the authorities, and he secures freedom for Jean and a reduced prison sentence for himself. Eve vows to wait for him.

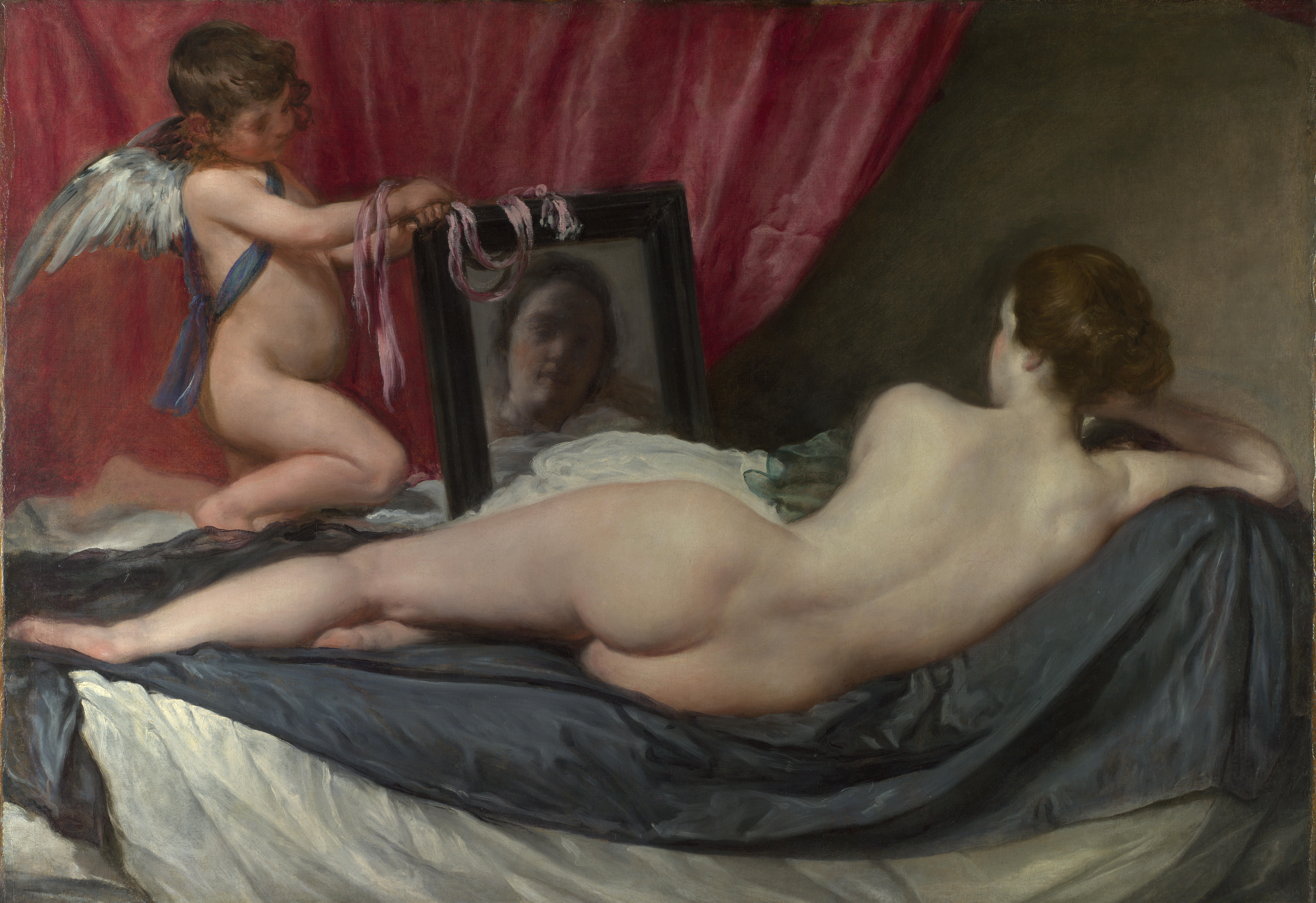
The painting stolen from the castle is Diego Velázquez's Rokeby Venus.

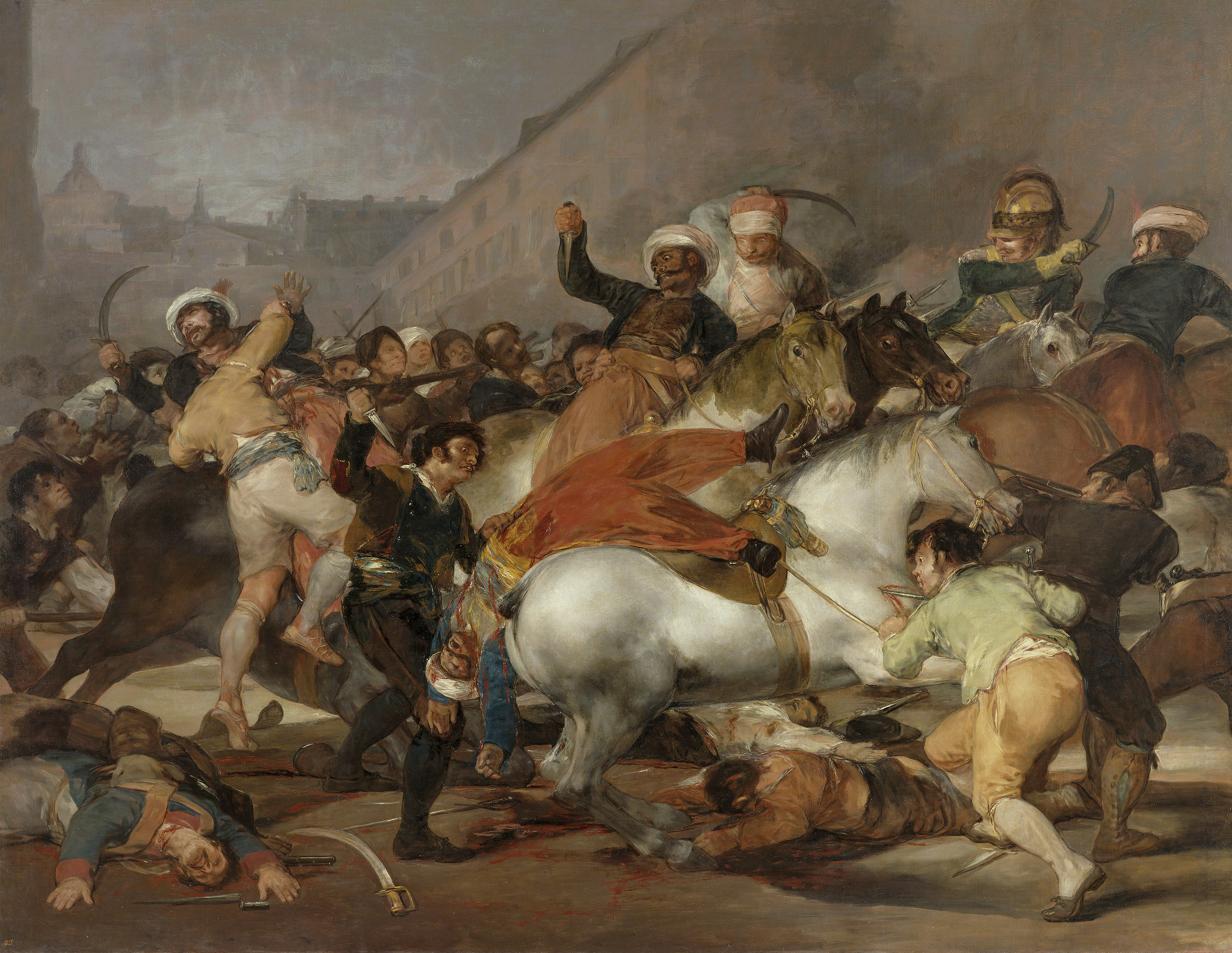
The painting they plan to steal from the Prado Museum is The Second of May 1808 by Francisco de Goya.

The cover story for working in the Prado is painting a legal copy of The Third of May 1808 by Goya.

== Cast ==
Rex Harrison and Rita Hayworth in The Happy Thieves

- Rita Hayworth as Eve Lewis
- Rex Harrison as Jimmy Bourne
- Joseph Wiseman as Jean Marie Calbert
- Alida Valli as Duchess Blanca
- Grégoire Aslan as Dr. Victor Muñoz
- Virgílio Teixeira as Cayetano the bullfighter (credited as Virgilio Texera)
- Peter Illing as Mr. Pickett
- Britta Ekman as Mrs. Pickett
- George Rigaud as Spanish Police Inspector
- Gérard Tichy as Antonio, Prado museum guard

== Production notes ==
The film was produced by Hayworth's production company, Hillworth Productions A.G., and distributed by United Artists. The film's executive producer was Hayworth's then-husband, James Hill.

== Music ==
During a test bullfight, a melody based on "Gernikako Arbola" can be heard.

== See also ==
- List of American films of 1961
