= The Keener's Manual =

The Keener's Manual is an imaginary book created by the 20th-century American political novelist Richard Condon. From it Condon used quotations or epigraphs, generally in verse, to either illustrate the theme of his novels, or, in a large number of cases, as the source of the title, in particular six of his first seven books: The Oldest Confession, Some Angry Angel, A Talent for Loving, An Infinity of Mirrors, and Any God Will Do. Only his second, and most famous novel, The Manchurian Candidate, derived its title elsewhere. A number of his later books also reference it for epigraphs, without, however, using any of its verse as a source for titles.

A "keen" is a "lamentation for the dead uttered in a loud wailing voice or sometimes in a wordless cry" and a "keener" is a professional mourner, usually a woman in Ireland, who "utters the keen... at a wake or funeral."

== The Oldest Confession ==
The epigraph to Condon's first novel, which appears on the title page of the first American hardback edition, reads in its entirety:

The Oldest Confession
Is one of Need,
Half the need Love,
The other half Greed

Later we encounter the first use of a phrase that is more widely known as the epigraph to The Manchurian Candidate than it is associated with this book; it has also appeared in other works by Condon. On page 142 the protagonist, James Bourne, is at his grandiloquent worst as he once again tries to justify his criminality to his mistress: "I am you and you are me and what can we do for the salvation of each other?" Two hundred pages later, as the book comes to its tragic conclusion, one broken woman tries to console another with an equally long-winded speech that ends with, "I am you and you are me and what have we done to each other?" A year later, with the publication of the book that was to make Condon famous, we find, on a frontis page of The Manchurian Candidate, two separate epigraphs, one supposedly from the Standard Dictionary of Folklore, Mythology and Legend, and the other, shorter one, from The Keener's Manual: "I am you and you are me and what have we done to each other?" In Condon's next book, Some Angry Angel a charismatic but homeless "rumdumb", orates to his fellow bums, "If this world is a legacy of Jesus Christ, then I am you and you are me and each flock to its own fold." Apparently, to Condon, this phrase denotes the inter-connectedness of all human beings to each other, particularly those who are committed lovers.

"I am you and you are me and what can we do for the salvation of each other?"

== Some Angry Angel ==
In Condon's third novel, published in 1960, the following verse is found in two places: as an epigraph on a blank frontis page five pages after the title page and two pages before the beginning of the text; and, on page 275, as the closing words of the book. The first quotation is attributed to The Keener's Manual but not the second.

Some angry angel,
Bleared by Bach and too inbred,
Climbed out of bed,
Pulled on a sock,
And, glancing downward,
Threw a rock
Which struck an earthbound peacock's head.
The peacock fell.
The peacock's yell,
Outraged by such treason,
Cried out to know why it,
Out of billions,
Should be hit,
And instantly invented a reason.
