= The Manchurian Candidate (2004 film) =

Film by Jonathan Demme

- Theatrical release poster
- Directed by: Jonathan Demme
- Screenplay by: Daniel Pyne; Dean Georgaris
- Based on: The Manchurian Candidate (1962 film) by George Axelrod; The Manchurian Candidate (novel) by Richard Condon
- Produced by: Tina Sinatra; Scott Rudin; Jonathan Demme; Ilona Herzberg
- Starring: Denzel Washington; Meryl Streep; Liev Schreiber; Jon Voight; Kimberly Elise; Jeffrey Wright; Ted Levine
- Cinematography: Tak Fujimoto
- Edited by: Carol Littleton; Craig McKay
- Music by: Rachel Portman (Note: Featuring Wyclef Jean)
- Production companies: Paramount Pictures; Scott Rudin Productions; Clinica Estetico
- Distributed by: Paramount Pictures (United States); United International Pictures (International)
- Release date: July 30, 2004
- Running time: 130 minutes
- Country: United States
- Language: English
- Budget: $80 million
- Box office: $96.1 million

The Manchurian Candidate is a 2004 American psychological political thriller film directed and produced by Jonathan Demme. It is a remake of the 1962 film, in turn adapted from Richard Condon's 1959 novel. It stars Denzel Washington as Bennett Marco, a tenacious, virtuous soldier; Liev Schreiber as Raymond Shaw, a U.S. Representative from New York, manipulated into becoming a vice-presidential candidate; Jon Voight as U.S. Senator Tom Jordan, a challenger for vice president; and Meryl Streep as Eleanor Prentiss Shaw, also a U.S. Senator and Raymond's manipulative ruthless mother.

While the name of the novel and the earlier film was retained, the significance of "Manchurian" was changed. In the original, the protagonist was captured in the Korean War and brainwashed by the Chinese army in Manchuria. In the 2004 film—with the Korean War replaced by the Gulf War—the term is instead used as the name of the fictitious sinister multinational company, Manchurian Global.

The Manchurian Candidate was released by Paramount Pictures on July 30, 2004. It received positive reviews and was a moderate commercial success. Streep was nominated for a BAFTA Award and Golden Globe for her performance.

== Plot ==
Major Bennett Marco commanded a U.S. Army unit during the Persian Gulf War in 1991. Sergeant First Class Raymond Shaw was awarded the Medal of Honor for actions following an enemy ambush of his reconnaissance patrol in Kuwait. Shaw led all but two survivors of the patrol on a three-day escape through the desert. Shaw is now a U.S. congressman whose ruthless mother, Virginia Senator Eleanor Prentiss Shaw, uses her influence to secure his nomination as the vice-presidential candidate over the favorite, Senator Tom Jordan. Shaw also resents her role in the break-up of his relationship with childhood sweetheart Jocelyn, Senator Jordan's daughter, prior to his enlistment.

One of Marco's former soldiers, Al Melvin, confesses to him he's having confusing dreams about the ambush, in which the patrol's soldiers are captured, tortured and brainwashed. Marco feels compelled to investigate and travels to New York City. En route he meets an outgoing supermarket clerk named Rosie who knows his name. Marco accepts her offer of lodgings. While showering at her apartment, he digs at a small lump he finds on his upper back and dislodges a metal object that falls down the sink after Rosie forces her way inside the bathroom in response to his sounds of distress.

Marco confronts Shaw at campaign headquarters, wrestles him to the ground and bites his back to remove an implant he suspects is there. Marco is arrested and released when Shaw refuses to press charges. He returns to Rosie's apartment still concealing Shaw's implant in his mouth. His friend Delp analyzes it, and surmises its purpose was storage of emergency medical data. He is aware of a parallel project for implantables funded by Manchurian Global, a powerful private equity firm with major political connections, including Senator Shaw. Delp administers electro-convulsive therapy with methohexital to Marco and he summons clearer recollections that he was brainwashed during the mission, and that the two missing soldiers were in fact killed by him and Shaw. He learns he's under surveillance when he discovers microcassettes in Rosie's handbag containing recordings of their conversations.

His research on Manchurian Global in the public library produces the name of Dr. Atticus Noyle, a South African geneticist accused of human experimentation on political prisoners during Apartheid who is involved in scientific research for Manchurian Global regarding novel memory implants. He shows his findings to Senator Jordan, who confronts the Shaws by connecting Dr. Noyle's work on deep implant behaviour modification financed by Manchurian Global during Desert Storm, Marco and Shaw's three day disappearance in the desert, and subsequent dreams and recollections of the patrol's members. When he suggests that Shaw withdraw from the campaign, Eleanor "activates" Shaw and orders him to kill Jordan. Jocelyn is killed trying to stop Shaw from murdering Jordan.

Marco confronts Rosie who reveals she's been surveilling him for the FBI. Knowing Melvin to have carried an implant and that he died mysteriously like the other members of the patrol, the FBI arranges to meet Marco and Shaw to convince them they were brainwashed under an assassination plot. Governor Arthur and Shaw win the White House. Shaw receives a phone call intended for Marco from Eleanor. She uses trigger words to command Marco to assassinate the President-elect so that Shaw will become president, admitting she voluntarily gave him to the brainwashers for the country's benefit. Shaw resists the mind-control techniques, empowered by Jocelyn's death, and deliberately places himself between the entranced Marco and the President-elect. As Rosie rushes through the crowd to find Marco, Shaw gives the signal to kill him and his mother. Shaw dances with Senator Shaw, leading them into the pre-arranged position, where Marco kills them both with a single rifle shot. Marco prepares to kill himself, but Rosie prevents his suicide by wounding him.

The FBI frames a deceased Manchurian Global contractor as the shooter. Manchurian executives watch in defeat as the conspiracy is revealed on live television. Rosie takes Marco to the remote island compound where he was conditioned. After reflecting on his time there, Marco drops a photo of his Army unit and Shaw's Medal of Honor into the sea.

== Cast ==
- Denzel Washington as Ben Marco
- Meryl Streep as Senator Eleanor Shaw
- Liev Schreiber as Raymond Shaw
- Jon Voight as Senator Thomas Jordan
- Kimberly Elise as Rosie
- Jeffrey Wright as Al Melvin
- Ted Levine as Colonel Howard
- Bruno Ganz as Delp
- Miguel Ferrer as Colonel Garret
- Dean Stockwell as Mark Whiting
- Jude Ciccolella as David Donovan
- Simon McBurney as Atticus Noyle
- Vera Farmiga as Jocelyn Jordan
- Obba Babatundé as Senator Wells
- Željko Ivanek as Vaughn Utly
- Paul Lazar as Gillespie
- John Bedford Lloyd as Jay "J.B." Johnston
- Anthony Mackie as Robert Baker
- Tom Stechschulte as Robert Arthur
- BeBe Winans as FBI Agent Williams
- Robyn Hitchcock as Laurence Tokar
- Charles Napier as General Sloan
- David Keeley as Agent Evan Anderson
- Alyson Renaldo as Mirella Freeman
- Pablo Schreiber as Eddie Ingram
- Harry Northup as Congressman Flores

In addition, cameos include: director Sidney Lumet as a political pundit, filmmaker Roger Corman as the Secretary of State, actor and future US Senator (2009–2018) Al Franken as a reporter, and humorist Roy Blount Jr. as a political pundit.

== Production ==
Producer Tina Sinatra's father, Frank, portrayed Marco in the preceding 1962 film and owned that film's legal distribution rights into the late 1980s, never re-releasing it during that time (although it did air on network television several times). In the original, nationally released during the Cuban Missile Crisis, the premise was based on communists taking control; in this remake, big corporate influence serves as the evil faction, a twist to maintain the "Manchurian connection". The remake does not follow the original film's plot details on several occasions.

The film's Persian Gulf War scenes were filmed in New Jersey.

== Reception ==
=== Box office ===
The Manchurian Candidate grossed $66.0 million domestically (United States and Canada) and $30.1 million in other territories, for a worldwide total of $96.1 million, against a production budget of $80 million. Released Jul 30, 2004, it opened at No. 3 and spent its first four weeks in the Top 10 at the domestic box office.

=== Critical response ===
On the review aggregator website Rotten Tomatoes, 79% of 208 critics' reviews are positive, with an average rating of 7.1/10. The website's consensus reads: "While not the classic its predecessor is, this update is well-acted and conjures a chilling resonance." Metacritic, which uses a weighted average, assigned the film a score of 76 out of 100, based on 41 critics, indicating "generally favorable" reviews. Audiences polled by CinemaScore gave the film an average grade of "B+" on an A+ to F scale.

Mick LaSalle of the San Francisco Chronicle wrote of Streep, "No one can talk about the acting in The Manchurian Candidate without rhapsodizing about Streep (in the role originated by Angela Lansbury). She has the Hillary hair and the Karen Hughes attack-dog energy, but the charm, the inspiration, and the constant invention are her own. She gives us a senator who's a monomaniac, a mad mommy and master politician rolled into one, a woman firing on so many levels that no one can keep up – someone who loves being evil as much as Streep loves acting. She's a pleasure to watch and to marvel at every second she's onscreen."

=== Accolades ===
| Award | Year | Category | Recipient(s) | Result |
|---|---|---|---|---|
| AARP Movies for Grownups Awards | 2005 | Best Actress | Meryl Streep | Nominated |
| BET Awards | 2005 | Best Actress | Kimberly Elise | Nominated |
| Black Reel Awards | 2005 | Best Supporting Actor | Jeffrey Wright | Nominated |
| Black Reel Awards | 2005 | Best Supporting Actress | Kimberly Elise | Nominated |
| British Academy Film Awards | 2005 | Best Actress in a Supporting Role | Meryl Streep | Nominated |
| Dallas–Fort Worth Film Critics Association Awards | 2005 | Best Supporting Actress | Meryl Streep | Nominated |
| Golden Globe Awards | 2005 | Best Supporting Actress – Motion Picture | Meryl Streep | Nominated |
| Hollywood Film Awards | 2005 | Costume Designer of the Year | Albert Wolsky | Won |
| Jupiter Awards | 2005 | Best International Actor | Denzel Washington | Nominated |
| Jupiter Awards | 2005 | Best International Actress | Meryl Streep | Nominated |
| Saturn Awards | 2005 | Best Action/Adventure/Thriller Film | The Manchurian Candidate | Nominated |
| Saturn Awards | 2005 | Best Supporting Actor | Liev Schreiber | Nominated |
| Saturn Awards | 2005 | Best Supporting Actress | Meryl Streep | Nominated |

== See also ==
- List of American films of 2004
- Brainwashing
