= 1985 New York Film Critics Circle Awards =

51st New York Film Critics Circle Awards

51st New York Film Critics Circle Awards

January 26, 1986

Best Picture:
Prizzi's Honor

The 51st New York Film Critics Circle Awards honored the best filmmaking of 1985. The winners were announced on December 18, 1985, and the awards were given on January 26, 1986.

== Winners ==
- Best Actor:
  - Jack Nicholson - Prizzi's Honor
  - Runner-up: William Hurt - Kiss of the Spider Woman
- Best Actress:
  - Norma Aleandro - The Official Story (La historia oficial)
  - Runners-up: Meryl Streep - Out of Africa and Geraldine Page - The Trip to Bountiful
- Best Cinematography:
  - David Watkin - Out of Africa
- Best Director:
  - John Huston - Prizzi's Honor
  - Runner-up: Akira Kurosawa - Ran
- Best Documentary:
  - Shoah
- Best Film:
  - Prizzi's Honor
  - Runner-up: The Purple Rose of Cairo, Out of Africa and Brazil
- Best Foreign Language Film:
  - Ran • Japan/France
- Best Screenplay:
  - Woody Allen - The Purple Rose of Cairo
  - Runner-up: Albert Brooks and Monica Johnson - Lost in America
- Best Supporting Actor:
  - Klaus Maria Brandauer - Out of Africa
  - Runner-up: John Gielgud - Plenty
- Best Supporting Actress:
  - Anjelica Huston - Prizzi's Honor
