= Prizzi's Family =

Crime novel

Prizzi's Family is a satirical, semi-humorous crime novel by Richard Condon published in 1986. It is the second of four novels featuring the Prizzis, a powerful family of Mafiosi in New York City. In all four novels the main protagonist is a top member of the family named Charley Partanna. It is a prequel to the very successful Prizzi's Honor of 1982, which was also adapted into an award-winning film.

== Plot summary ==
The story takes place in 1969, about ten years before the events of Prizzi's Honor. Charley Partanna, the top hitman for Don Carrado's family, meets an attractive larger blonde dancer in one of the Family's nightclubs. She calls herself Mardell La Tour, and claims that she is English and is partially guided through life by radio waves emanating from Buckingham Palace. Charley believes her, however her actual identity is Grace Willand Crowell, daughter of an immensely wealthy Assistant Secretary of State for East Asian and Pacific Affairs whose family lives in Georgetown. She has faked her identity to help a friend of hers who is working on a master's degree in sociology. Mardell, an aspiring actress, has assumed a number of off-beat real-life identities in the last year in order to provide insights about different levels of society for her friend, with her latest role being that of a showgirl trying to get established in nightclubs.

At the same time that Charley begins a highly emotional but also sexual affair with Mardell, Maerose Prizzi, a granddaughter of the powerful Don, has been mapping out her future career in which she aims to become the first female Don of a family. A key element in her plans, for both tactical and strategic reasons, is marriage to Charley. She soon begins a sexual affair with the hapless Charley, who is now buffeted between the increasingly strident emotional demands of the two women—as well as carrying out his primary duties, that of eliminating various people across the United States seen as threats to various high-ranking members of the Prizzi family. Events come to a surreal semi-climax at an enormous engagement party that Don Carraro has organized for Maerose and Charley—to the stupefaction of her family, Maerose becomes embarrassingly drunk and runs off to Mexico City with one of the male guests. After that, it only remains for Charley to carry out another multiple homicide for the family, to bring back four thumbs to the Don, and to allow Mardell to withdraw herself from his life.

== Condon's style ==
Condon attacked his targets, usually gangsters, financiers, and politicians, wholeheartedly but with a uniquely original style and wit that made almost any paragraph from one of his books instantly recognizable. Reviewing one of his works in the International Herald Tribune, the well-known playwright George Axelrod (The Seven-Year Itch, Will Success Spoil Rock Hunter), who had collaborated with Condon on the screenplay for the film adaptation of The Manchurian Candidate, wrote:

"The arrival of a new novel by Richard Condon is like an invitation to a party.... the sheer gusto of the prose, the madness of his similies, the lunacy of his metaphors, his infectious, almost child-like joy in composing complex sentences that go bang at the end in the manner of exploding cigars is both exhilarating and as exhausting as any good party ought to be."

In Prizzi's Honor, Condon's normal exuberance was somewhat curbed by choosing to narrate the events through the viewpoints of its various semi-literate gangsters, which limited the scope of his imagery. In Family, however, he returns to being his usual omniscient narrator and we have:

A description of Maerose's father, Vincent Prizzi, son of the Don, and Boss of the family: "Vincent conspired with his own ignorance. He was a perpetually baffled man who chewed on pieces of himself and then spat them out at the world."

The Don makes a speech to an enormous family gathering: "The way he did this was whisper into Vincent's ear in Sicilian, then Vincent spoke it into the microphone in Brooklynese, dumping the words out of the depths of his stomach the way a piled wheelbarrow is emptied by upending it."

Charley makes love for the first time with Maerose: "It was like being locked in a mailbag with eleven boa constrictors."

== Real-life names in the book ==
All of Condon's books have, to an unknown degree, the names of real people in them as characters, generally very minor or peripheral. The most common, which appears in most of his books, is some variation of Franklin M. Heller. The real-life Heller was a television director in New York City in the 1950s, '60s, and 70s, who initially lived on Long Island and then moved to a house on Rockrimmon Road in Stamford, Connecticut. In this book Franklin Heller is the mayor of New York.

A.H. Weiler, a film critic for The New York Times, was another friend of Condon's who in this book is Dr. Abraham Weiler, the best orthopedic surgeon in the Northwest.

== Reception ==
Publishers Weekly liked it:

Obsessed with Mardell yet pulled by loyalty and lust to Maerose, Charley is trapped between them, all the while carrying out his regular duties as the Prizzi enforcer. Condon serves up this zesty mix with good humor, broadside slams at politicians and evangelism, and generous helpings of Sicilian food.

Kirkus Reviews had mixed feelings about it:

...the sketches of Mafia viciousness and hypocrisy are often deliciously mordant; and, with those movie characterizations to bolster Charley and Maerose in the reader's mind, there's enough dark whimsy and oafish pathos here to provide earthy, quirky, fast-moving entertainment.

Jimmie Breslin, however, in The New York Times, definitely did not like it:

At first the prequel seemed to be satire and then appeared to be heading toward spoof. Complainant waited to laugh and was surprised and disappointed when he did not. Complainant Breslin states that he is certain he heard Defendant Condon laugh. Defendant then delivered a felonious assault, using characters with no sense of reality to them who were involved in story lines that have more holes than a shooting victim. Defendant Condon probably will earn handsome pay and honors when they turn Prizzi's Family into a movie. But Defendant Condon did enter bookstores in disdain of criminal code 155.40 (grand larceny, first degree) in that he enticed people who trust his name and loved his past successes and that in doing so, he committed the crime of grand larceny, first degree.

== Adaptation ==
In June 1990, it was announced Sidney Lumet had signed on to direct an adaptation of Prizzi's Family from a script written by William Richert. However, the film was never made.
