= An Infinity of Mirrors =

Novel by Richard Condon

- First edition hardback cover
- Author: Richard Condon
- Language: English
- Publisher: Random House
- Publication date: September 11, 1964
- Publication place: United States
- Media type: Print (hardback & paperback)

An Infinity of Mirrors was the fifth and most ambitious book by the American satirist and political novelist Richard Condon. First published by Random House in 1964, it is set in France and Germany of the 1930s and 1940s, as seen through the eyes of a beautiful, rich Parisian Jew and her beloved husband, an old-fashioned Prussian army general. What unfolds is an almost unrelievedly bleak depiction of the rise of the Nazis and the Third Reich .

Despite a few moments of typical Condonian gayness and insouciance, the overall tone of the book is one of foreboding, incipient horror, and the impending doom of the Holocaust. After publishing four novels from 1958 through 1961, Condon was already widely known as the author of The Manchurian Candidate and was the subject of a so-called "Condon Cult". He then took three years to research the historical background of An Infinity of Mirrors and bring it to publication.

All of Condon's earlier books were replete with unexpected moments of violence and gratuitous death, but none can compare with An Infinity of Mirrors' account of mass murder. Perhaps because of the unquestionably depressing nature of the book, it attracted less critical acclaim than his earlier works and did not noticeably expand the Condon Cult. The term "Holocaust" is not used in the book, as it was far less common in 1964, but Condon gives the reader an extremely grim picture of its origins and some of the practical details involved in its bureaucratic, yet evil, execution. The book was not a commercial success and, unlike three of his first four books, was never made into a film.

== Impetus ==
Back cover of the 1964 first edition with an explanation by Condon of why he wrote the book

Condon's impetus for writing An Infinity of Mirrors is laid out in an excerpt from a letter from him that takes up the entire back dust cover of the first American edition. In it, he writes:

The story of Hitler's nihilism—destruction for the sake of destruction—and the incongruity of Nazis occupying Paris—the Beast in the city of Beauty, as it were—have attracted me since the end of World War II.... What I wanted to say was that when evil confronts us in any form, it is not enough to flee it or to pretend that it is happening to somebody else. But though evil must be opposed, when it is fought with evil's ways, it must ultimately corrupt and strangle the opposer.

== Critical reception ==
Time magazine was not greatly impressed by Condon's latest offering and gave it a fairly cursory review:

Richard Condon's apocalyptic pocketa-pocketa has produced a resplendent collection of giants, ogres and drowsy princesses, all flimsily disguised as people. They reappear in this grim foray into Hitler-corrupted Germany, but the author of The Manchurian Candidate has turned from dismayed humour to dismaying homily. Condon's current princess is an enormously wealthy, unbelievably beautiful Frenchwoman; though Jewish, she is married to a monocle-twirling Prussian general who cannot see the evil of Hitler until their adored child dies in a Jewish concentration camp. They retaliate by consigning the guilty SS officer to a grisly fate. However, the novel does not keep its implicit promise to find meaning in mankind's acquiescence in evil. Worse, Condon's stylistic limitations, which hardly matter in a farce, cripple a serious novel. As an old Hollywood press agent and the possessor of a considerable comic talent, he should recall the studio adage that messages are for Western Union.

Flaws were also found in the book by the New York Times reviewer David Dempsey, but the review was generally more favorable:

The cover of a 1965 paperback edition published by Fawcett Crest

Any novelist who conspires with history in writing a novel runs the obvious risk of letting history do too much of the work. Something like this has happened to Richard Condon in An Infinity of Mirrors. A note on the dust jacket tells us that the author spent three years researching and writing this book, and a bibliographical preface confirms the thoroughness with which this research has been done.

In a way, such conscientiousness is too bad; one suspects that this might have been a better novel if it weren't such good history—if Mr. Condon, that is, had been more willing to play with his characters as fiction creations....

Because Mr. Condon possesses a diverting style (he is best known for his ring-a-ding The Manchurian Candidate), these keys offer admission to a kind of Playboy Club in which all the entertainment is in the Grand Guignol manner. Hitler is revealed to be the owner of the club, rarely seen and brooding in an inner office. General Keitel serves as the maitre d'hôtel, while Generals von Stauffenberg and Stülpnagel work as head waiters. SS officers are employed as bouncers. The club is bankrupt, the bunnies are mostly hors de combat (if we may be permitted a fractured-French pun), and, as Mr. Condon states in his title, there are lots and lots of mirrors.

== Title ==
The title, as is the case in six of Condon's first seven books, is derived from a fictitious Keener's Manual mentioned in many of his earlier novels: "God surrounded me with an infinity of mirrors which repeat my image again and again and again."

The sentence is found as an epigraph on a blank page, six pages after the title page and three pages before the beginning of the text.

== Characters ==
- Paule Bernheim - Main character
- Wilhelm (Veelee) von Rhode-Paule's German husband (Member of Prussian-German Army)
- Paul-Alain Bernheim - Paule's French father (a Famous actor)
- Paul-Alain von Rhode - Paule & Veelee's son
- Maitre Gitlin - Paule's French lawyer
- Gretel & Gisel - Veelee's sister's
- Hans-Gretel's husband
- SS Colonel Drayst - Nazi Colonel obsessed with Paule, and tries on several occasions to attack her.
- Mme. Coitlin-Paule's maid and nurse

== Typical Condon quirks and characteristics ==
The "madness" of Condon's similes and "lunacy" of his metaphors, for which he was already noted, are missing. As are, or almost entirely muted, many of his other characteristics, such as long, madcap, detailed lists of trivia. Among the noticeably few similes and metaphors are:

- "Gretel spoke the local dialect flawlessly, but to Paule it sounded like a Mandarin singing in Gaelic."
- "Piocher disengaged himself from Fräulein Nortnung in a manner reminiscent of a driver getting out from under an overturned truck."

An Infinity of Mirrors, does have, however, a notable example of Condon's penchant for playful lists, in this case the delineation of those attending the funeral of a famous French actor and notable lover:

Seven ballerinas of an amazing spectrum of ages were at the graveside. Actresses of films, opera, music halls, the theatre, radio, carnivals, circuses, pantomimes, and lewd exhibitions mourned on the front line. There were also society leaders, lady scientists, women politicians, mannequins, couturières, Salvation Army lassies, all but one of his wives, a lady wrestler, a lady matador, twenty-three lady painters, four lady sculptors, a car-wash attendant, shopgirls, shoplifters, shoppers, and the shopped; a zoo assistant, two choir girls, a Métro attendant from the terminal at the Bois de Vincennes, four beauty-contest winners, a chambermaid; the mothers of children, the mothers of men, the grandmothers of children and the grandmothers of men; and the general less specialized, female public-at-large which had come from eleven European countries, women perhaps whom he had only pinched or kissed absent-mindedly while passing through his busy life. They attended twenty-eight hundred and seventy strong, plus eleven male friends of the deceased.
