= Prizzi's Money =

Crime novel by Richard Condon

Prizzi's Money is a satirical, semi-humorous crime novel by Richard Condon published in 1994. It is the last of four novels featuring the Prizzis, a powerful family of Mafiosi in New York City. It was also the last of 28 books that Condon wrote over a 36-year career. In all four Prizzi novels the main protagonist is a top member of the family named Charley Partanna. In this book, however, which takes place about six or seven years after the events of the first novel, Prizzi's Honor, and at least a decade before those of the third book, Prizzi's Glory, Charley's role is less important than in the three others; although he makes brief appearances in the first half of the book, it is not until the second half that he becomes one of the primary characters.

== Plot summary ==
On the opening page Henry George Asbury, "adviser to presidents", is kidnapped from his powerboat in the middle of Long Island Sound. We learn soon enough that Asbury, a millionaire director of innumerable companies and well-known confidant to the last four presidents, has, along with his beautiful wife, Julia, arranged for his own kidnapping in order to use the eventual ransom money to preserve his faltering companies. Julia, a noted hostess and society fixture, is actually Julia Melvini, daughter of a Prizzi hitman called "the Plumber" who is second cousin to Corrado Prizzi, the capo di tutti capi, and subordinate to Charley Partanna. All four Prizzi books are about money, power, murders, and politics, but in this one money itself is the prime concern and the three other elements, although inextricably linked to it, are clearly subordinate. The main theme of the book is the twist-filled struggle between Julia Asbury, as Sicilian in her plotting as the most devious capo, and the ancient but still indomitable Don Corrado himself. Charley Partanna, 36 years old as the book opens, eventually plays his usual role of naive, good-natured, and love-stricken semi-simpleton as well as deadly killer.

== Condon's style ==
Condon attacked his targets, usually gangsters, financiers, and politicians, wholeheartedly and with a uniquely original style and wit that make almost any paragraph from one of his books instantly recognizable. Reviewing one of his works in the International Herald Tribune, the well-known playwright George Axelrod (The Seven-Year Itch, Will Success Spoil Rock Hunter), who had collaborated with Condon on the screenplay for the film adaptation of The Manchurian Candidate, wrote:

The arrival of a new novel by Richard Condon is like an invitation to a party.... the sheer gusto of the prose, the madness of his similes, the lunacy of his metaphors, his infectious, almost child-like joy in composing complex sentences that go bang at the end in the manner of exploding cigars is both exhilarating and as exhausting as any good party ought to be.

In Prizzi's Honor, Condon's normal exuberance was somewhat curbed by choosing to narrate the events through the viewpoints of its various semi-literate gangsters, which limited the scope of his imagery. In Money, however, he returns to being his usual omniscient narrator, giving the reader:

Vincent had a totally closed face, like a bank vault shut impenetrably by a system of time locks. Somewhere, hidden deep within his past, there was a boyish openness that had not been seen by anyone for over sixty years because, through carelessness, the combination to the shut vault of his expressiveness had been lost, somewhere in his preternatural resentment of everything that moved.

He was a smallish man with a jockey's hump at the top of his spine, coffee-colored skin, and a nose not quite as large or as colorful as a keel-billed toucan's.

Charley Partanna ... was a large, muscular man with a voice like grinding taxicab gears. In fact, if taxis wore clothes they would resemble Charley.

== Real-life names in the book ==
All of Condon's books have, to an unknown degree, the names of real people in them as characters, generally very minor or peripheral. The most common, which appears in most of his books, is some variation of Franklin M. Heller. The real-life Heller was a television director in New York City in the 1950s, '60s, and 70s, who initially lived on Long Island and then moved to a house on Rockrimmon Road in Stamford, Connecticut. In this book Franklin Marx Heller is the senior partner of a Wall Street law firm called O'Connell, Heller & Melvin. page

A.H. Weiler, a film critic for The New York Times, was another friend of Condon's who in this book is mentioned several times as Doctor Abraham Weiler, "the most renowned plastic surgeon of the day". page 37

In a number of books a character named Keifetz appears, named apparently for Norman Keifetz, a New York City author who wrote a novel about a major league baseball player called The Sensation—a novel that was dedicated to Condon. In this book he is referred to as Wambly Keifetz of the Bahama Beaver Bonnet Company. page 101

Condon was a long-time friend of the thriller-political novel writer Charles McCarry and in this book has a newspaper reporter named McCarry covering the Kennedy Airport beat. page 115

== Reception ==
Publishers Weekly liked it a lot:

...Love rears its intrusive head when she [Julia Asbury] gets involved with Prizzi enforcer Charley Partanna, who reads romantic novels, cooks dinner for his widowed father and can fall in love—or kill—at the drop of a hat. Since Don Corrado has chosen Julia as the ideal wife for one of his sons, matters become hilariously complicated. As is his wont, Condon uses these goings-on as a base from which to take pointed shots at the rich and powerful, especially Reagan Republicans, and several broad swipes at American life in the '90s. It's all great fun, even if the heavy-handed lampoonery goes over the top now and again.

Kirkus Reviews felt the same:

Condon in top form with his fourth all-Prizzi novel. Just as Prizzi's Family (1986) was a prequel to Prizzi's Honor (1982), so this latest is a prequel to Prizzi's Glory (1988).... We know from Prizzi's Glory that Charley at last marries Maerose and becomes Chief of Staff to Edward's President of the USA. A tangled web!

The New York Times loved it:

... the latest riotously funny installment in a series of novels.... As was the case in Prizzi's Honor, the infamous don, his vile sons and their assorted vindicatori, intimidatori and even what Mr. Condon refers to as "assistant intimidatori" and "apprentice vindicatori" now find themselves confronted by a force of nature that they are culturally unequipped to deal with: a perfidious woman 10 times more cunning and determined than they are. As the long-suffering don gloomily laments: "Sixteen months ago this Asbury woman was a simple housewife, now she runs 137 companies and wants to take over the biggest conglomerate in America. It's that... woman's movement that puts these crazy ideas into their heads.".... The delicious notion that the Cosa Nostra could somehow be subverted by Naomi Wolf-style power feminism is only one of the gloriously crackpot ideas that appear in "Prizzi's Money.".... Of course, what really makes the novel work is Mr. Condon's acid prose....
