= And Then We Moved to Rossenarra =

1973 memoir by Richard Condon

- First edition
- Author: Richard Condon
- Language: English
- Subject: Memoir
- Publisher: Dial Press
- Publication date: 1973
- Publication place: United States
- Media type: Print

And Then We Moved to Rossenarra: or, The Art of Emigrating is a memoir by American political novelist Richard Condon, published by Dial Press in 1973. A native of New York City whose early career had mostly been that of a press agent for various Hollywood studios, Condon took up writing relatively late in life but then became both prolific and famous; today, he is most remembered for his 1959 political thriller The Manchurian Candidate and for his four later novels about a family of New York gangsters named Prizzi.

And Then We Moved to Rossenarra is a mostly light-hearted and occasionally humorous account of Condon's family's many moves and residences throughout Europe and Mexico in the decades preceding the publication of the memoir. Before their move to Rossenarra House, the name of a large, 1824 Georgian country house in County Kilkenny, Ireland, the Condon family had lived in "Paris, Madrid, New York, Mexico City, Paris again, London, Geneva, Locarno... spending a minimum of fourteen months in Spain... and a maximum of nine and a half years in Switzerland." In the late 1960s, the Irish government passed legislation permitting foreign writers, composers, and artists to live in Ireland without being subject to local income tax. A number of British writers, such as Len Deighton, Frederick Forsyth, and Leslie Charteris, as well as the Americans J. P. Donleavy and Anne McCaffrey, immediately took up residence. Condon asserts, however, that despite moving to Rossenarra about the same time, his own finances and citizenship were such that he never benefitted from living in this tax-free haven.

Much of the book is devoted to his purchase and excruciatingly long and expensive restoration of the country house, with many incidents about incompetent plumbers, electricians, and other trades people, all directed by a fictional "Capo" invented by Condon as a humorous device. A memoir rather than a formal autobiography, the narrative is presented in a non-chronological manner, jumping almost randomly from one decade to another. The chapters all have long-winded, whimsical names in the style of 19th-century novels, (In Which we find Locarno. Shall we try England next? Or Crans? Or Adelaide, Australia? How to tell a Rolls Royce from a Mercedes), and there are frequent asides and anecdotes about food and its preparation in various cultures, as well as about some of Condon's books, particularly his first one, The Oldest Confession, and his most famous one, The Manchurian Candidate.

In 1955, Condon, the publicity agent for The Pride and the Passion, a film starring Frank Sinatra and Sofia Loren being made in Spain, was present at a scene being filmed in the ancient rectory of the Escorial, the massive palace and cathedral outside of Madrid. The enormous lights needed to film the scene "revealed dozens upon dozens of great masterpieces of paintings that had not been seen centuries, hung frame touching frame—the work of Goya, Velasquez, the great Dutch masters, and the most gifted masters of the Italian Renaissance."

...The idea of masterpieces of Spanish painting hanging in stone castles all over Spain, high and invisible in the darkness, stayed with me and gradually formed itself into a novel called The Oldest Confession, which got me over the wall to freedom and got us off the high road to high-style, free-lance emigrating.

Back in New York, Condon began turning his initial concept into a screenplay—until his wife pointed out, correctly, that he was writing it in the past tense instead of the present, which is obligatory for screenplays, and that it should be turned into a novel. Condon followed her advice, and the book was published to favorable reviews not long later.

In contrast to most of Rossenarra, which is distinctly flip in manner, some of Condon's comments in Chapter 19 about the supposed similarities between the assassination of President John F. Kennedy and his The Manchurian Candidate, which had been published three years before the murder, are both heartfelt and bitter in their assessment of the American character.

Scattered throughout the book, almost at random, are anecdotes and stories that generally have at least a slight relationship to the theme of the chapter in which they are found. Working as a youth for Walt Disney Studios, for instance, Condon helped promote a sequel to the famous, and very successful, animated cartoon The Three Little Pigs. The sequel, The Practical Pig, he writes, involved a tie-up with "large colored displays of the characters and title in 18,924 pork and meat shops from coast to coast during the week the film would appear."

Disney stared at me the way Eleanor Roosevelt would have looked at Heinrich Himmler... his face gone white and haggard... so shocked that his lower lip bobbled... "It's like you were working for Metro and you tied up three of their biggest stars with National Embalming Week"... The measure of Disney, the man, is that he did not fire me... I would have fired me. I felt like a murderer. That was 1937. It wasn't until 1959, when we moved to Mexico, that I could really enjoy pork again. For the first few years it was like trying to eat roast actor.

As a result of his first few novels, all of them strikingly original in either content or manner of telling, Condon had become not only famous, with reviews in all major media, such as The New York Times, Time, and Newsweek, but also something of a literary cult figure. By the time Rossenarra was published, however, his reputation had slipped so much that its only mention in any of these three outlets was a notice of its appearance in "A Listing of Recently Published Books" in The New York Times of May 30, 1973.
