= The Vertical Smile =

Novel by Richard Condon

- First edition
- Author: Richard Condon
- Language: English
- Genre: Political Satire
- Publisher: New York, Dial Press
- Publication date: 1971
- Publication place: United States
- Media type: Print (Hardback, Paperback)
- Pages: 334 pp (first edition, hardback)
- ISBN: 978-0803796133
- OCLC: 195069

The Vertical Smile is a political satire novel by Richard Condon, published in 1971. It deals with politics, sex and greed, centering on the 68-year-old mother of a political candidate falling in love with a 70-year-old man with a very outrageous and scandalous history.

== Reception ==
The novel was panned by Kirkus in 1971. The reviewer wrote that "those who remember Mr. Condon as a staggering storyteller will have to look elsewhere" and "very readable it's not".
