= Emperor of America =

Novel by Richard Condon

- First edition cover
- Author: Richard Condon
- Language: English
- Genre: Satirical novel
- Publisher: Simon & Schuster
- Publication date: January 1990
- Publication place: United States
- Media type: Print (Hardback & Paperback)
- ISBN: 0-671-68643-7 (first edition, hardback)
- OCLC: 20393160
- Dewey Decimal: 813/.54 20
- LC Class: PS3553.O487 E47 1990

Emperor of America is a novel by Richard Condon published in 1990. It is a satire about an "Imperial Presidency", poking fun at Ronald Reagan.

== Plot summary ==
A nuclear device explodes in Washington and destroys the White House. The Royalist Party and the National Rifle Association of America are nominally those responsible but Condon's target is Reaganism and its legacy, embodied in the character of an Army colonel, Caesare Appleton, who becomes Emperor Caesare I.
