= David Dempsey (writer) =

American writer (1914–1999)

David Dempsey (January 9, 1914 – January 13, 1999) was an American writer best remembered for his book reviews and coverage of the publishing industry as a journalist.

== Biography ==
Dempsey was born in Pekin, Illinois. He married Evangeline Semon and they had a son, Ian. The family lived in Rye, New York

During World War II, Dempsey covered the American landings on four Pacific islands as a Marine Corps combat correspondent.

Dempsey wrote a weekly column, "In and Out of Books", for The New York Times Book Review from 1949 to 1953, and a column on the publishing industry for The Saturday Review from 1963 to 1970.

== Books ==
=== Nonfiction ===
- U.S. Marines on Iwo Jima (1945)
- Uncommon Valor: Marine Divisions in Action (1946)
- The Way We Die (1975)
- Psychology and You, with Philip Zimbardo (1978)

== Novels ==
- All That Was Mortal (Dutton; 1978)
