= A Talent for Loving (film) =

1969 film by Richard Quine

- Directed by: Richard Quine
- Written by: Richard Condon (screenplay)
- Based on: A Talent for Loving by Richard Condon
- Produced by: Walter Shenson
- Starring: Richard Widmark; Chaim Topol; Cesar Romero
- Cinematography: Clifford Stine
- Edited by: Eric Boyd-Perkins
- Music by: Ken Thorne
- Distributed by: Paramount Pictures
- Release date: 1969
- Running time: 110 minutes
- Countries: United Kingdom; United States
- Language: English

A Talent for Loving is a 1969 British-American comedy Western film directed by Richard Quine and starring Richard Widmark, Chaim Topol, and Cesar Romero. It is based on the 1961 parodic Western novel A Talent for Loving, or The Great Cowboy Race by Richard Condon, who also wrote the screenplay. The home video version of the film (Simitar Entertainment) is re-titled Gun Crazy and has been edited to 95 minutes (not to be confused with the 1950 film: Gun Crazy).

In December 1965, Walter Shenson offered A Talent for Loving to Brian Epstein as a film vehicle for the Beatles, and it was rejected unanimously.

== Plot ==
A gambler named Patten wins the deed to a Mexican ranch, but finds a curse has been placed on the place. Don Jose must marry off his beautiful, nymphomaniacal daughter to permanently free her of the curse.

== Cast ==
- Richard Widmark as Major Patten
- Chaim Topol as Molina
- Cesar Romero as Don Jose
- Geneviève Page as Delphine
- Fran Jeffries as Maria
- Derek Nimmo as Moodie
- Max Showalter as Franklin
- Joe Melia as Tortillaw
- John Bluthal as Martinelli
- Libby Morris as Jacaranda
- Judd Hamilton as Jim
- Caroline Munro as Evalina Patten
