= Winter Kills (film) =

1979 film by William Richert

- Film poster by John Solie
- Directed by: William Richert
- Written by: William Richert
- Based on: Winter Kills (1974 novel) by Richard Condon
- Produced by: Fred C. Caruso
- Starring: Jeff Bridges; John Huston; Anthony Perkins; Eli Wallach; Sterling Hayden; Dorothy Malone; Tomás Milián; Belinda Bauer; Ralph Meeker; Toshiro Mifune; Richard Boone
- Cinematography: Vilmos Zsigmond
- Edited by: David Bretherton
- Music by: Maurice Jarre
- Production company: Winter Gold Productions Ltd.
- Distributed by: AVCO Embassy Pictures
- Release date: May 17, 1979
- Running time: 97 minutes
- Countries: United States; West Germany
- Language: English
- Budget: $6.5 million
- Box office: $1,083,799

Winter Kills is a 1979 satirical black-comedy political thriller film written and directed by William Richert, based on the 1974 novel by Richard Condon. Inspired by the John F. Kennedy assassination conspiracy, its ensemble cast includes Jeff Bridges, John Huston, Anthony Perkins, Eli Wallach, Richard Boone, Toshirō Mifune, Sterling Hayden, Dorothy Malone, Belinda Bauer, Ralph Meeker, Elizabeth Taylor, Berry Berenson and Susan Walden. Bridges portrays Nick Kegan, who, 20-years after the assassination of his brother, U.S. President Timothy Kegan (patterned after Kennedy), discovers hard evidence that there had been a conspiracy behind it.

Despite its all-star cast and high production values, the film was independently financed by novice producers Leonard Goldberg and Robert Sterling, and directed by unknown filmmaker Richert. The film had a difficult production, with production shutting down due to a lack of funds, and cast and crew failing to be paid. Goldberg was murdered and Sterling arrested and convicted of drug trafficking.

Failing to find wide distribution, Winter Kills was a commercial failure and received mixed reviews from critics. In time, it gained a cult following.

== Plot ==
Nick Kegan, half-brother to assassinated U.S. President Timothy Kegan, is pulled into an elaborate conspiracy 19 years after the event. Arthur Fletcher, a mysterious man, arrives on Nick's father Pa's oil tanker to reveal that he and another gunman were hired to assassinate President Kegan in 1960. Fletcher claims to have hidden the murder weapon in Philadelphia, then dies before he can give more details. Nick goes to Philadelphia with two associates, Captain Walt Heller and Miles Garner and retrieves the rifle; they are ambushed, Heller and Miles are killed, and the rifle is stolen. Pa is initially dismissive but pivots and pledges to help solve the mystery "for the family".

Nick meets a series of characters who offer conflicting narratives: Z.K. Dawson, a wealthy rival to his father, implicates dead police captain Heller (Nick's associate was an imposter) and his aide Lt. Roy Doty. Doty confirms corrupt Philadelphia police involvement, and alleges a Mafia connection that funded Kegan's campaign, but which left a $2 million dollar debt to it purportedly unpaid. A Lee Harvey Oswald-like patsy would be set up for the presidential slaying, who would be eliminated by Joe Diamond, a sleazy organized crime-connected nightclub owner himself in hock to the Mob.

Irving Mentor, a Mob-connected gangster Nick meets in Cleveland, adds another layer, claiming the assassination was instigated by a Hollywood studio over financial loss due to an affair between Tim and a movie starlet who committed suicide. Nick's girlfriend, Yvette Malone, supposedly an employee at National Magazine, promises to break the story.

Back in New York, John Cerruti, the family "information czar", offers new twists on the assassination, and reveals he has dirt enough on anybody who’s anyone to blackmail them. He drops three bombshells on Nick: Yvette was just an actress paid to manipulate him, and is now lying dead in a college dissecting lab. And it was Pa who had Tim killed, dissatisfied with his son's anti-business policies.

Nick confronts his father at his office in a New York City skyscraper. Pa says he owned the movie studio, paid back the mob, and blames the assassination on a nexus of organized crime, the covert world, and big business. Cerruti has gone power-mad and is blackmailing him. As they argue, Keifetz, a family operative who had brought the dying Fletcher aboard the oil tanker for the deathbed confession, bursts in with orders to kill Nick. In the ensuing gunfight, Keifetz and an officer are killed, and Pa seeks to flee Nick's murderous pursuit by going out on a ledge. He falls to his death tearing through a giant American flag while shouting at Nick to relocate the family investments to South America.

== Cast ==
- Jeff Bridges as Nick Kegan
- John Huston as Pa Kegan
- Anthony Perkins as John Cerruti
- Eli Wallach as Joe Diamond
- Sterling Hayden as Z.K. Dawson
- Dorothy Malone as Emma Kegan
- Tomas Milian as Frank Mayo
- Belinda Bauer as Yvette Malone / Jenny O'Brien
- Ralph Meeker as "Gameboy" Baker
- Toshiro Mifune as Keith
- Richard Boone as Keifitz
- David Spielberg as Miles Garner
- Brad Dexter as Captain Walt Heller One
- Michael Thoma as Ray Doty
- Ed Madsen as Captain Walt Heller Two
- Irving Selbst as Irving Mentor
- Joe Spinell as Arthur Fletcher
- Gladys Hill as Rosemary
- Kim O'Brien as Blonde Girl
- Candice Rialson as Blonde Girl
- Gianni Russo as Co-Pilot
- Lissette as Soledad
- Robert Moresco as Intern
- Agneta Eckemyr as Nurse
- Tisa Farrow as Nurse
- Camilla Sparv as Beautiful Woman
- Erin Gray as Beautiful Woman
- Berry Berenson as Morgue Attendant
- Elizabeth Taylor as Lola Comante
- Byron Morrow as Secretary of State
- John Warner as President Timothy Kegan

== Production ==
=== Writing ===
Leonard Goldberg and Robert Sterling, drug dealers with little film experience, optioned the book Winter Kills from Richard Condon for $75,000 plus 5% of proceeds and 10% of home video. Then unknown William Richert convinced the pair of novice producers to let him direct the film after he had adapted Condon's novel. Richert convinced Jeff Bridges to star in the movie by moving into his neighborhood in Malibu and acting out scenes for him at a local delicatessen.

The film simplifies the plot of the book somewhat.

=== Filming ===
Filming began on December 13, 1976. Many of the film's interior scenes were shot in 1977 at the Greystone Mansion in Beverly Hills, then home to the American Film Institute's film school. Richert wanted to film Pa Kegan (John Huston)'s death at the Pan Am Building but claims he was denied permission by an irate employee who threatened that the film would not be allowed within 20 blocks of the building because the "Kennedys have offices here".

Sterling and Goldberg had previously worked on releasing the French softcore Emmanuelle films in the U.S. Winter Kills was under-capitalized. Needing a budget of $6 million, Sterling and Goldberg raised $2.3 million from a West German financier. Many actors were never paid or only received the 20% of their fee that was held in escrow. Elizabeth Taylor insisted on being paid her $100,000 fee up front. Some cast and crew reported that they began receiving their pay by being called to a hotel room where they were given envelopes of well-used bills. Eventually, people were working for free until union officials heard of this arrangement. In March 1977, unions shut down the production, forcing it to declare bankruptcy. Goldberg was murdered just before the movie's opening and Sterling was later sentenced to 40 years in prison for marijuana smuggling.

Bridges and Belinda Bauer went to Germany to work on Richert's next film, The American Success Company. Richert was able to use money from that production to resume work on Winter Kills. On December 18, 1978, production resumed and filming was finished in two weeks. The director explained his devotion to the project by comparing Winter Kills to "cinematic cocaine". John Bailey filled in as cinematographer because Vilmos Zsigmond was working on another film. The film's distributor, Embassy Pictures, controlled the final cut.

== Reception ==
=== Box office ===
The film returned $1 million on a $6.5 million budget. Embassy Pictures limited preview screenings to a few cities, foregoing the national and international markets. Condon and Richert alleged without support that Avco-Embassy killed it to avoid threatening Avco's federal contracts, which totalled nearly $864 million in 1979. The picture failed to get nationwide distribution, but performed modestly where it was shown. In time it gained a cult following.

=== Critical response ===
Winter Kills received a mixed critical response. Janet Maslin of The New York Times compared it to M*A*S*H and Dr. Strangelove, writing, "Winter Kills isn't exactly a comedy, but it's funny. And it isn't exactly serious, but it takes on the serious business of the Kennedy assassination". The Times' Vincent Canby also praised the film, complimenting writer/director William Richert's imagination. Brendan Gill of The New Yorker saw the film twice and reported that "I enjoyed it even more the second time, but I cannot pretend that I understood it any better. It is like some intricately embroidered misadventure recounted by a superb, somewhat tipsy storyteller late at night in the library of a big country house, with the cold rain of an enemy night lashing against the windows, and a cozy ruin of red fire red upon the hearth". David Ansen of Newsweek wrote, "In keeping with a morality tale on the excesses of wealth and power, it is extravagantly confusing, grandiosely paranoid, flamboyantly absurd and more than a little fun. Though it utterly lacks the internal consistency that 'good' movies require, as a wild-goose chase it maintains a certain lunatic fascination".

Other contemporary critics were negative, many harshly so. Variety magazine wrote of the film, "If there’s a decent film lurking somewhere in Winter Kills, writer-director William Richert doesn’t want anyone to see it in his Byzantine version of a presidential assassination conspiracy". Gene Siskel of the Chicago Tribune gave the film 1 star out of 4 and wrote, "Winter Kills rapes the memory of President John F. Kennedy while giving his late father a few dozen kicks in the head, too ... It revels in its every degrading scene. One feels a little less clean just having seen this picture". Charles Champlin of the Los Angeles Times called it "the kind of conspiratorial caper you like for its continual surprises or hate for its escalating confusions ... It is a Gee Whiz item, expansive, impersonal, never dull". Gary Arnold of The Washington Post called it an "extravagantly kitschy" film with a "fairly repulsive" story.

Since that time, reviews have become more positive with Peter Sobczynski of RogerEbert.com giving the film four stars and saying "it seems to have grown even bolder with age in its willingness to take on sacred cows in the craziest manner imaginable." Brad Hanford of Slant Magazine called it a "riotously entertaining, chillingly perceptive film."

Rotten Tomatoes rates it 88% fresh based on 25 reviews with the consensus: "A singularly strange roman à clef rich with paranoia and black humor, Winter Kills views the political skullduggery of the late 20th century with a sharp, jaundiced eye.".

== Home media ==
In the early 1980s, the film was released on VHS in the United States by Embassy Home Entertainment, while in the United Kingdom it was released on VHS by 20th Century Fox Video. In 1983, Richert acquired the rights to the film and re-released a director's cut. The second version included a new ending and additional footage of Elizabeth Taylor.

In 2023, Quentin Tarantino spearheaded another re-release of Winter Kills featuring a new 35 mm print. John Bailey oversaw the project, which was completed at FotoKem.

== Documentary ==
Who Killed 'Winter Kills'? is a 2003, 38-minute documentary film, directed by Perry Martin and distributed by Anchor Bay, about the production of the film.
