= A Talent for Loving (novel) =

Novel by Richard Condon

- Cover of 1961 first edition published by McGraw-Hill
- Author: Richard Condon
- Language: English
- Genre: Fiction
- Published: July 18, 1961
- Publisher: McGraw-Hill
- Publication place: United States
- Media type: Print

A Talent for Loving; or The Great Cowboy Race was the fourth novel by Richard Condon. Published in 1961, it was one of the books that inspired a brief cult for his strenuously off-beat works. A subtitle does not appear on the cover of its first edition but is shown on an inner page.

== Plot ==
In the 16th century an Aztec priest has cut off his own hand and used the bloody stump to lay a curse upon a blasphemous Spanish conquistador and all his direct descendants. The curse: that once any of the descendants, whether male or female, have tasted physical love, even in the form of a single kiss, they will spend the rest of their lives as being nearly sexually insatiable. Three centuries later the beautiful young virginal daughter of a fabulously wealthy Texas rancher and gambler is its latest victim. An elaborate set of contests and races is arranged to choose which of two cowboys will win her hand in marriage.

== Critical reception ==
The cover of the 1978 Ballantine Books paperback edition.

The reception was mixed. Time magazine said:

Disciples are the undoing of holy men, and so it is with Richard Condon, a talented and satirical fantast whose fiercely proselytizing followers regard him as the fifth hoarse man of the Apocalypse. A Condon novel has the sound and shape of a bagful of cats.... But Condon's latest morality, a Western, is written with calculation, not exasperation. It is not hard to imagine the author fretfully asking himself, on a dry day, what would be a good, juicy Condon touch.... Proof that the author himself knows that something is wrong is that on almost every page he stops to wave at friends in the crowd. A street in Paris, for instance, is not too slyly titled "Rue Artbuch Wald."

The New York Times was more favorable:

One could go on about Richard Condon's surrealist story lines, his laugh-out-loud satiric wit, and his inordinate ability to invent outlandish detail. But the key to reading the author... correctly is to see him as a sophistocated Hans Christian Andersen, a teller of sardonic fairy tales for adults.... Along the way in his new novel, which is the Western to end them all, Condon follows his bent of inserting a measure of social commentary into his neatly laced phrases. Thus: "Never among the savage peoples of history, excepting the white man, has there been equal to the ferocity, the intelligence and the wanton destructiveness of the Apache Indians." But Condon's main aim is still to fascinate, surprise, entertain. And the reader is successfully dazzled into a page-turning trance, like a book-struck child.... Since this is a novel by Richard Condon, it all ends with brilliantly eccentric symmetry as a war party of savage Injuns dash out to rescue the whites from a massacre by the cavalry.

== Title ==
The title, as is the case in six of Condon's first seven books, is derived from the first line of a typical bit of Condonian doggerel that supposedly comes from a fictitious Keener's Manual mentioned in many of his earlier novels:

The riches I bring you
Crowding and shoving,
Are the envy of princes:
A talent for loving.

The verse is found as an epigraph on a blank page five pages after the title page and four pages before the beginning of the text.

== See also ==
- A Talent for Loving (film)
