= Richard Condon =

American novelist (1915–1996)

- Born: Richard Thomas Condon; March 18, 1915; New York City, U.S.
- Died: April 9, 1996 (aged 81); Dallas, Texas, U.S.
- Occupation: Novelist
- Spouse: Evelyn Hunt
- Children: 2
- Writing career
- Genres: Political fiction; crime fiction; thriller fiction; satire
- Notable work: The Manchurian Candidate

Richard Thomas Condon (March 18, 1915 – April 9, 1996) was an American novelist, known for his satirical works of political and crime fiction. Several of his books were bestsellers and a number were made into films; he is primarily remembered for his 1959 The Manchurian Candidate and, many years later, a series of four novels about the New York crime family called the Prizzis.

Condon's writing was known for its complex plotting, fascination with trivia, and loathing for those in power; at least two of his books featured thinly disguised versions of Richard Nixon. His characters tend to be driven by obsession, usually sexual or political, and family loyalty. His plots often have elements of classical tragedy, with protagonists whose pride leads them to destroy what they love.

Though his works were satire, they were generally transformed into thrillers or semi-thrillers in other media, such as cinema. All 26 books were written in distinctive Condon style, which combined a fast pace, outrage, and frequent humor while focusing almost obsessively on monetary greed and political corruption. Condon himself once said: "Every book I've ever written has been about abuse of power. I feel very strongly about that. I'd like people to know how deeply their politicians wrong them."

Some of his books, most notably Mile High (1969), are perhaps best described as secret history. And Then We Moved to Rossenarra is a humorous autobiographical recounting of various places in the world where he had lived and his family's 1970s move to Rossenarra, County Kilkenny, Ireland.

== Early life and work ==
Condon was born in New York City, his parents were Richard and Martha (Pickering). Condon attended DeWitt Clinton High School. He was enlisted in the United States Merchant Navy.

After his discharge, he achieved moderate success as a Hollywood publicist, ad writer and agent. Condon turned to writing in 1957. Employed by United Artists as an ad writer, he complained that he was wasting time in Hollywood and wanted to write a novel. Without Condon's knowledge, his boss, Max E. Youngstein, deducted money from his salary, then fired him after a year, returning the amount of money he had deducted in the form of a Mexican bank account and the key to a house overlooking the ocean in Mexico. Youngstein told him to write his book. His second novel, The Manchurian Candidate (1959), featured a dedication to Youngstein and was made into a successful film.

== Worldview ==
In Condon's eighth novel, Mile High, a spectacularly ruthless gangster imposes Prohibition upon an unwary populace. Condon sums up the theme of all his books in a single angry cri de coeur:

Prohibition fused the amateurism and catch-as-catch-can national tendencies of the early days of the republic with a more modern, highly organized lust for violence and the quick buck. It fused the need to massacre twelve hundred thousand American Indians and ten million American buffalo, the lynching bees, the draft riots, bread riots, gold riots and race riots, the constant wars, the largest rats in the biggest slums, boxing and football, the loudest music, the most strident and exploitative press with the entire wonderful promise of tomorrow and tomorrow, always dragging the great nation downward into greater violence and more unnecessary deaths, into newer and more positive celebration of nonlife, all so that the savage, simple-minded people might be educated into greater frenzies of understanding that power and money are the only desirable objects for this life.

== Genre ==
Condon's works are not easily categorized: A 1971 Time magazine review declared that, "Condon was never a satirist: he was a riot in a satire factory. He raged at Western civilization and every last one of its works. He decorticated the Third Reich, cheese fanciers, gossip columnists and the Hollywood star system with equal and total frenzy." The headline of his obituary in The New York Times called him a "political novelist", but went on to say that, "Novelist is too limited a word to encompass the world of Mr. Condon. He was also a visionary, a darkly comic conjurer, a student of American mythology and a master of conspiracy theories, as vividly demonstrated in 'The Manchurian Candidate'." Although his books combined many different elements, including occasional outright fantasy and science fiction, they were, above all, written to entertain the general public. He had, however, a genuine disdain, outrage, and even hatred for many of the mainstream political corruptions that he found so prevalent in American life. In a 1977 quotation, he said that:

...people are being manipulated, exploited, murdered by their servants, who have convinced these savage, simple-minded populations that they are their masters, and that it hurts the head, if one thinks. People accept servants as masters. My novels are merely entertaining persuasions to get the people to think in other categories.

With his long lists of absurd trivia and "mania for absolute details", Condon was, along with Ian Fleming, one of the early exemplars of those called by Pete Hamill in a New York Times review, "the practitioners of what might be called the New Novelism... Condon applies a dense web of facts to fiction.... There might really be two kinds of fiction: the fiction of sensibility and the fiction of information... As a practitioner of the fiction of information, no one else comes close to him."

== Style ==
Condon attacked his targets wholeheartedly but with an original style. Reviewing one of his works in the International Herald Tribune, playwright George Axelrod (The Seven Year Itch, Will Success Spoil Rock Hunter), who had collaborated with Condon on the screenplay for the film adaptation of The Manchurian Candidate, wrote:

The arrival of a new novel by Richard Condon is like an invitation to a party.... the sheer gusto of the prose, the madness of his similes, the lunacy of his metaphors, his infectious, almost child-like joy in composing complex sentences that go bang at the end in the manner of exploding cigars is both exhilarating and as exhausting as any good party ought to be.

=== Metaphors ===
From his 1975 novel, Money Is Love, comes a fine example of the "lunacy of his metaphors": "Mason took in enough cannabis smoke to allow a Lipan Apache manipulating a blanket over it to transmit the complete works of Tennyson."

The Manchurian Candidate offers:

The effects of the narcotics, techniques, and suggestions... achieved a result that approximated the impact an entire twenty-five-cent jar of F. W. Woolworth vanishing cream might have on vanishing an aircraft carrier of the Forrestal class when rubbed into the armor plate.

=== Lists and trivia ===
Condon was also enamored of long and detailed lists. In An Infinity of Mirrors, for instance, those in attendance of the funeral of a famous French actor and notable lover are delineated as:

Seven ballerinas of an amazing spectrum of ages were at graveside. Actresses of films, opera, music halls, the theatre, radio, carnivals, circuses, pantomimes, and lewd exhibitions mourned in the front line. There were also society leaders, lady scientists, women politicians, mannequins, couturières, Salvation Army lassies, all but one of his wives, a lady wrestler, a lady matador, twenty-three lady painters, four lady sculptors, a car-wash attendant, shopgirls, shoplifters, shoppers, and the shopped; a zoo assistant, two choir girls, a Métro attendant from the terminal at the Bois de Vincennes, four beauty-contest winners, a chambermaid; the mothers of children, the mothers of men, the grandmothers of children and the grandmothers of men; and the general less specialized, female public-at-large which had come from eleven European countries, women perhaps whom he had only pinched or kissed absent-mindedly while passing through his busy life. They attended twenty-eight hundred and seventy strong, plus eleven male friends of the deceased.

Writing about The Whisper of the Axe in the daily book review column of Friday, May 21, 1976, in the New York Times, Richard R. Lingeman praised the book in particular and Condon in general for the "extravagance of invention unique with him."

Not everyone was as exhilarated by Condon's antics, however. In a long Times Sunday review just two days after Lingeman's, Roger Sale excoriated Condon as a writer of "how-to books" in general, this book in particular, and Condon's habit of using lists: "A lot of it is done with numbers arbitrarily chosen to falsely simulate precision."

=== Use of real-life names ===
Condon sometimes used the names of real people in his works. For example, the most common, which appears in all of his books, is some variation of Franklin M. Heller. The real-life Heller was a television director in New York City in the 1950s, '60s, and 70s, who initially lived on Long Island and then moved to a house on Rockrimmon Road in Stamford, Connecticut. Beginning with Mile High in 1969, mentions of a Rockrimmon Road or Rockrimmon House also began to appear regularly in the novels. Late in life Heller grew a thick white beard and became a devotee of needlework—both traits that the fictional Hellers shared, sometimes to ludicrous effect, as when a battle-hardened Admiral Heller is depicted issuing orders while absorbed in needlework. The real-life Heller made one needlework depiction of the manor house in Ireland in which Condon was living at the time. In Prizzi's Honor, Marxie Heller is a mobster and murder victim; in Prizzi's Family, Franklin Heller is the mayor of New York City; in Prizzi's Glory, the Heller Administration is mentioned, implying that he is the president of the United States.

== Filmed works ==
Condon was for many years a Hollywood publicity man for Walt Disney and other studios. The demands of his career with United Artists—promoting movies such as The Pride and the Passion and The King and Four Queens—led to a series of bleeding ulcers and a determination to do something else. He took up writing in early middle age, with his first novel, The Oldest Confession, published at 43.

His next book, The Manchurian Candidate, combined all the elements that defined his works for the next 30 years: nefarious conspiracies, satire, black humor, outrage at political and financial corruption in the American scene, breath-taking elements from thrillers and spy fiction, horrific and grotesque violence, and an obsession with the minutiae of food, drink, and fast living. It quickly made him, for a few years at least, the center of a cult devoted to his works. As he rapidly produced more and more books with the same central themes, however, this following fell away and his critical reputation diminished. Still, over the next three decades Condon produced works that returned him to favor, both with the critics and the book-buying public, such as Mile High, Winter Kills, and the first of the Prizzi books, Prizzi's Honor.

Of his numerous books that were turned into Hollywood movies, The Manchurian Candidate was filmed twice. The first version, in 1962, which starred Frank Sinatra, Laurence Harvey, Janet Leigh, and Angela Lansbury, followed the book with great fidelity, and is now highly regarded as a glimpse into the mindset of its era. Janet Maslin, writing already over two decades ago, said in The New York Times in 1996 that it was "arguably the most chilling piece of cold war paranoia ever committed to film, yet by now it has developed a kind of innocence."

=== Films adapted from Condon novels ===
- The Happy Thieves, from The Oldest Confession (1961)
- The Manchurian Candidate (1962)
- A Talent for Loving (1969)
- Winter Kills (1979)
- Prizzi's Honor (1985)
- The Manchurian Candidate (2004)

== The Keener's Manual ==
Beginning with his first book, The Oldest Confession, Condon frequently prefaced his novels with excerpts of verse from a so-called Keener's Manual; these epigraphs foreshadowed the theme of the book or, in several instances, gave the book its title. The Keener's Manual, however, was a fictional invention by Condon and does not actually exist. A "keen" is a "lamentation for the dead uttered in a loud wailing voice or sometimes in a wordless cry" and a "keener" is a professional mourner, usually a woman in Ireland, who "utters the keen... at a wake or funeral."

Five of Condon's first six books derived their titles from the fictional manual, the only exception being his most famous book, The Manchurian Candidate. The epigraph in The Manchurian Candidate, however, "I am you and you are me /and what have we done to each other?" is a recurring theme in earlier Condon's books: in various forms it also appears as dialog in both The Oldest Confession and Some Angry Angel. Among other epigraphs, the last line of "The riches I bring you /Crowding and shoving, /Are the envy of princes: /A talent for loving." is the title of Condon's fourth novel. His fifth and sixth novels, An Infinity of Mirrors and Any God Will Do, also derive their titles from excerpts of the manual.

Years later, Condon's 1988 novel Prizzi's Glory also had an epigraph from the manual, the first one in at least a dozen books.

== Plagiarism charge ==
In 1998, a Californian software engineer named C. J. Silverio noticed several paragraphs in The Manchurian Candidate that appeared nearly identical to portions of the celebrated 1934 novel I, Claudius by the English writer Robert Graves. She wrote about the apparent plagiarism on her website, but her discovery went unnoticed by most of the world until Adair Lara, a longtime San Francisco Chronicle staff writer, wrote a lengthy article about the accusation in 2003. Reprinting the paragraphs in question, she also solicited the opinion of a British forensic linguist, who concluded that Condon had unquestionably plagiarized at least two paragraphs of Graves's work. In Some Angry Angel, the book that followed The Manchurian Candidate by a year, Condon also made a direct reference to Graves, reflecting in a long, convoluted passage on page 25 on "mistresses" and their relationship to Graves's writings about "Major Male" Deities and "Major Female" Deities.

By the time of the Lara article more than seven years had passed since Condon's death, and the piece failed to generate any literary interest outside the Chronicle.

== Works ==
All novels except as noted:

- The Oldest Confession, Appleton-Century-Crofts, New York, 1958, Library of Congress Catalog Card Number: 58-8662; Longman, London, 1959, as The Happy Thieves
- The Manchurian Candidate, McGraw-Hill, New York, 1959, Library of Congress Catalog Card Number: 59–8533
- Some Angry Angel: A Mid-Century Faerie Tale, McGraw-Hill, New York, 1960, Library of Congress Catalog Card Number: 60–8826
- A Talent for Loving; or, The Great Cowboy Race, McGraw-Hill, New York, 1961, Library of Congress Catalog Card Number:61-10467; later made into the film version A Talent for Loving (1969) for which Condon himself wrote the script
- An Infinity of Mirrors, Random House, New York, 1964, Library of Congress Catalog Card Number: 64–17935
- Any God Will Do, Random House, New York, 1964, Library of Congress Catalog Card Number: 66–21462
- The Ecstasy Business, The Dial Press, New York, 1967, Library of Congress Catalog Card Number: 67–14467
- Mile High, The Dial Press, New York, 1969, Library of Congress Catalog Card Number: 77–80497
- The Vertical Smile (1971)
- Arigato (1972)
- The Mexican Stove (1973)—cookbook co-written with his daughter Wendy Bennett
- And Then We Moved to Rossenarra: or, The Art of Emigrating, The Dial Press, New York, 1973, PS3553.0487z5—memoir
- Winter Kills (1974)
- The Star-Spangled Crunch (1974)
- Money Is Love (1975)
- The Whisper of the Axe (1976)
- The Abandoned Woman (1977)
- Death of a Politician (1978)
- Bandicoot (1979)
- The Entwining (1981)
- Prizzi's Honor (1982)
- A Trembling upon Rome (1983)
- Prizzi's Honor (1985) - Film adaptation of his novel; co-wrote screenplay with Janet Roach
- Prizzi's Family (1986)
- Prizzi's Glory (1988)
- Emperor of America (1990)
- The Final Addiction (1991)
- The Venerable Bead (1992)
- Prizzi's Money (1994)
