= Prizzi's Honor =

1985 film by John Huston

- Theatrical release poster
- Directed by: John Huston
- Screenplay by: Richard Condon; Janet Roach
- Based on: Prizzi's Honor (1982 novel) by Richard Condon
- Produced by: John Foreman
- Starring: Jack Nicholson; Kathleen Turner
- Cinematography: Andrzej Bartkowiak
- Edited by: Kaja Fehr; Rudi Fehr
- Music by: Alex North
- Production company: ABC Motion Pictures
- Distributed by: 20th Century Fox
- Release date: June 14, 1985
- Running time: 129 minutes
- Country: United States
- Language: English
- Budget: $16 million
- Box office: $26.6 million

Prizzi's Honor is a 1985 American black comedy crime film directed by John Huston, adapted by Richard Condon and Janet Roach from the former's 1982 novel. It stars Jack Nicholson and Kathleen Turner as two highly-skilled mob assassins who, after falling in love, are hired to kill each other. The cast also features Anjelica Huston, Robert Loggia, John Randolph, CCH Pounder, Lawrence Tierney, and William Hickey. Stanley Tucci appears in a minor role in his film debut.

The film was theatrically released on June 14, 1985, by 20th Century Fox, and was the last of John Huston's films to be released during his lifetime. It received critical acclaim, with praise for the performances of its cast (most notably Anjelica Huston). It grossed $26 million against its $16 million budget.

Prizzi's Honor received eight nominations at the 58th Academy Awards (including for Best Picture, Best Director, and Best Actor for Nicholson) with Huston winning for Best Supporting Actress. It also won four Golden Globes, including Best Actor – Motion Picture Musical or Comedy and Best Actress – Motion Picture Comedy or Musical for Nicholson and Turner, respectively.

== Plot ==
Charley Partanna is a hitman for a New York Mafia family headed by the elderly Don Corrado Prizzi, whose business is generally handled by his sons Dominic and Eduardo and by his longtime right-hand man, Angelo, who is Charley's father.

At a family wedding, Charley is quickly infatuated with a beautiful non-Italian woman he doesn't recognize. He asks Maerose Prizzi, estranged daughter of Dominic, if she recognizes the woman, oblivious to the fact that Maerose still has feelings for Charley, having once been his lover. Maerose is in disfavor with her father for running off with another man before the end of her romance with Charley.

Charley flies to California to carry out a contract to kill a man named Marxie Heller for robbing a Nevada casino. He is surprised to learn that Marxie is the estranged husband of Irene Walker, the woman from the wedding. She repays some of the money Marxie stole as Charley naively (or willfully) believes that Irene was not involved with the casino scam. By this point they have fallen in love and eventually travel to Mexico to marry. A jealous Maerose travels west on her own to establish for a fact that Irene has double-crossed the organization. The information restores Maerose to good graces somewhat with her father and the don. Charley's father later reveals that Irene (who had claimed to be a tax consultant) is a "contractor" who, like Charley, performs assassinations for the mob.

Dominic, acting on his own, wants Charley out of the way and hires someone to do the hit, not knowing that he has just given the job to Charley's own wife. Angelo sides with his son, and Eduardo is so appalled by his brother's actions that he helps set up Dominic's permanent removal from the family.

Irene and Charley team up on a kidnapping that will enrich the family, but she shoots Mrs. Calhane, a police captain's wife, in the process, endangering the organization's business relationship with the cops. The don is also still demanding a large sum of money from Irene for her unauthorized activities in Nevada, which she doesn't want to pay. In time, the don tells Charley that his wife's "gotta go".

Matters come to a head in California when, acting as if everything were all right, Charley comes home to his wife. Each pulls a weapon simultaneously in the bedroom. Irene ends up dead, and Charley ends up back in New York, missing her, but consoled by Maerose.

== Cast ==
- Jack Nicholson as Charley Partanna
- Kathleen Turner as Irene Walkervisks / Irene Walker / Mrs. Heller
- Anjelica Huston as Maerose Prizzi
- Robert Loggia as Eduardo Prizzi
- John Randolph as Angelo "Pop" Partanna
- William Hickey as Don Corrado Prizzi
- Lee Richardson as Dominic Prizzi
- Michael Lombard as Rosario Filangi / Robert Finlay
- CCH Pounder as "Peaches" Altamont
- George Santopietro as Plumber
- Ann Selepegno as Amalia Prizzi
- Lawrence Tierney as Lieutenant Davey Hanley
- Vic Polizos as Phil Vittimizzare
- Dick O'Neil as Bluestone
- Sully Boyar as Casco Vasorne
- Raymond Heller as Sal Bocca
- Joseph Ruskin as Marxie Heller
- Seth Allen as Alvin Gomsky
- Dominic Barto as Presto Cigilone
- Raymond Serra as Bocca
- Stanley Tucci as Soldier
- Marlene Williams as Mrs. Calhane

== Production ==
=== Development and casting ===
John Huston received a copy of Condon's novel while shooting Under the Volcano in Mexico. He initially passed on directing, but after producer John Foreman had hired Anjelica, her then-boyfriend Jack Nicholson, and Huston's long-time associate Janet Roach, he "was pulled into the project because he knew everyone involved." He hired Meta Carpenter Wilde, the script supervisor who worked with him on The Maltese Falcon (1941) and Rudi Fehr, his film editor from Key Largo (1948).

Anjelica Huston was paid the SAG-AFTRA scale rate of $14,000 for her role in Prizzi's Honor. When her agent called the movie's producer to ask for more money, she was told "Go to hell. Be my guest—ask for more money. We don't even want her in this movie." Huston wrote in her 2014 memoir Watch Me that she later overheard a production worker saying, "Her father is the director, her boyfriend's the star, and she has no talent." She would go on to win the Academy Award for Best Supporting Actress for her performance at the 58th Academy Awards.

A 25-year-old Stanley Tucci made his film debut in Prizzi's Honor, playing the minor role of a mafia henchman.

=== Filming ===
Filming took place at various locations in Brooklyn and in Palisades Park, New Jersey. A sequence was also shot at the Bel Age Hotel (now London West Hollywood) in Beverly Hills. Additional shooting took place in Las Vegas.

Rocco Musacchia, an alleged Genovese crime family associate, was employed by the producers as a technical advisor. Foreman said "[Musacchia] works on most of the pictures that go to New York as sort of a local contact. He knows his way around Brooklyn."

== Reception ==
=== Critical response ===
On Rotten Tomatoes, Prizzi's Honor holds an approval rating of 85% based on 40 reviews, with an average rating of 7.3/10. The site's critics consensus states: "Disturbing and sardonic, Prizzi's Honor excels at black comedy because director John Huston and his game ensemble take the farce deadly seriously." Metacritic, which uses a weighted average, assigned the film a score of 84 out of 100, based on 16 critics, indicating "universal acclaim".

Pauline Kael wrote: "This John Huston picture has a ripe and daring comic tone. It revels voluptuously in the murderous finagling of the members of a Brooklyn Mafia family, and rejoices in their scams. It's like The Godfather acted out by The Munsters. Jack Nicholson's average-guyness as Charley, the clan's enforcer, is the film's touchstone: this is a baroque comedy about people who behave in ordinary ways in grotesque circumstances, and it has the juice of everyday family craziness in it." Roger Ebert gave the film three-and-a-half stars out of four and wrote: "This is the most bizarre comedy in many a month, a movie so dark, so cynical and so funny that perhaps only Jack Nicholson and Kathleen Turner could have kept straight faces during the love scenes."

The February 2020 issue of New York Magazine lists Prizzi's Honor as among "The Best Movies That Lost Best Picture at the Oscars."

=== Awards and nominations ===
| Award | Category | Nominee(s) | Result | Ref. |
|---|---|---|---|---|
| Academy Awards | Best Picture | John Foreman | Nominated | |
| Academy Awards | Best Director | John Huston | Nominated | |
| Academy Awards | Best Actor | Jack Nicholson | Nominated | |
| Academy Awards | Best Supporting Actor | William Hickey | Nominated | |
| Academy Awards | Best Supporting Actress | Anjelica Huston | Won | |
| Academy Awards | Best Screenplay – Based on Material from Another Medium | Richard Condon and Janet Roach | Nominated | |
| Academy Awards | Best Costume Design | Donfeld | Nominated | |
| Academy Awards | Best Film Editing | Rudi Fehr and Kaja Fehr | Nominated | |
| Artios Awards | Outstanding Achievement in Feature Film Casting – Comedy | Alixe Gordin | Won | |
| Boston Society of Film Critics Awards | Best English-Language Film | | Won | |
| Boston Society of Film Critics Awards | Best Actor | Jack Nicholson | Won | |
| Boston Society of Film Critics Awards | Best Supporting Actress | Anjelica Huston | Won | |
| Boston Society of Film Critics Awards | Best Director | John Huston | Won | |
| British Academy Film Awards | Best Actress in a Supporting Role | Anjelica Huston | Nominated | |
| British Academy Film Awards | Best Adapted Screenplay | Richard Condon and Janet Roach | Won | |
| David di Donatello Awards | Best Foreign Producer | John Foreman | Nominated | |
| David di Donatello Awards | Best Foreign Director | John Huston | Nominated | |
| David di Donatello Awards | Best Foreign Actor | Jack Nicholson | Nominated | |
| David di Donatello Awards | Best Foreign Screenplay | Richard Condon and Janet Roach | Nominated | |
| Directors Guild of America Awards | Outstanding Directorial Achievement in Motion Pictures | John Huston | Nominated | |
| Golden Globe Awards | Best Motion Picture – Musical or Comedy | | Won | |
| Golden Globe Awards | Best Actor in a Motion Picture – Musical or Comedy | Jack Nicholson | Won | |
| Golden Globe Awards | Best Actress in a Motion Picture – Musical or Comedy | Kathleen Turner | Won | |
| Golden Globe Awards | Best Supporting Actress – Motion Picture | Anjelica Huston | Nominated | |
| Golden Globe Awards | Best Director – Motion Picture | John Huston | Won | |
| Golden Globe Awards | Best Screenplay – Motion Picture | Richard Condon and Janet Roach | Nominated | |
| Kansas City Film Critics Circle Awards | Best Supporting Actress | Anjelica Huston | Won | |
| Los Angeles Film Critics Association Awards | Best Actor | Jack Nicholson | Nominated | |
| Los Angeles Film Critics Association Awards | Best Supporting Actor | William Hickey | Nominated | |
| Los Angeles Film Critics Association Awards | Best Supporting Actress | Anjelica Huston | Won | |
| Los Angeles Film Critics Association Awards | Best Screenplay | Richard Condon and Janet Roach | Nominated | |
| Nastro d'Argento | Best Foreign Actor | Jack Nicholson | Nominated | |
| Nastro d'Argento | Best Foreign Director | John Huston | Nominated | |
| National Board of Review Awards | Top Ten Films | | 6th Place | |
| National Board of Review Awards | Best Supporting Actress | Anjelica Huston | Won | |
| National Society of Film Critics Awards | Best Film | | 2nd Place | |
| National Society of Film Critics Awards | Best Director | John Huston | Won | |
| National Society of Film Critics Awards | Best Actor | Jack Nicholson | Won | |
| National Society of Film Critics Awards | Best Supporting Actor | William Hickey | 2nd Place | |
| National Society of Film Critics Awards | Best Supporting Actress | Anjelica Huston | Won | |
| National Society of Film Critics Awards | Best Screenplay | Richard Condon and Janet Roach | 4th Place | |
| New York Film Critics Circle Awards | Best Film | | Won | |
| New York Film Critics Circle Awards | Best Director | John Huston | Won | |
| New York Film Critics Circle Awards | Best Actor | Jack Nicholson | Won | |
| New York Film Critics Circle Awards | Best Supporting Actress | Anjelica Huston | Won | |
| Sant Jordi Awards | Best Foreign Actress | Kathleen Turner | Won | |
| ShoWest Convention | Female Star of the Year | Kathleen Turner | Won | |
| Venice Film Festival | Golden Lion | John Huston | Nominated | |
| Venice Film Festival | Special Lion for the Overall Work | John Huston | Won | |
| Writers Guild of America Awards | Best Screenplay – Based on Material from Another Medium | Richard Condon and Janet Roach | Won | |

=== American Film Institute ===
- AFI's 100 Years...100 Laughs – Nominated
- AFI's 100 Years...100 Passions – Nominated
- AFI's 10 Top 10 – Nominated (Gangster Film)

== Unrealized follow-up ==
In June 1990, it was announced Sidney Lumet had signed on to direct an adaptation of Prizzi's Family from a script written by William Richert. However, the film was never made.
