= Winter Kills (novel) =

American novel

- First edition cover
- Author: Richard Condon
- Language: English
- Genre: Black comedy novel
- Publisher: Doubleday
- Publication date: May 1974
- Publication place: United States
- Media type: Print (hardback, paperback); AudioBook (cassette)
- Pages: 304 pp
- ISBN: 0-8037-8822-3
- OCLC: 810974
- Dewey Decimal: 813/.5/4
- LC Class: PZ4.C746 Wi PS3553.O487
- Preceded by: Arigato (1972)
- Followed by: The Star-Spangled Crunch (1974)

Winter Kills is a black comedy novel by Richard Condon exploring the assassination of a U.S. president. Published in 1974, its plot parallels the murder of John F. Kennedy and various conspiracy theories about it.

== Plot ==
U.S. President Timothy Kegan has been assassinated in Hunt Plaza in Philadelphia. The ensuing presidential commission determined a lone gunman had been responsible.

Years later Kegan's half-brother, Nick, witnesses the death-bed confession of a man claiming to have been part of the killing's 'hit squad'. As Nick attempts to uncover those behind it he encounters a web of figures and groups that could have led or been part of the conspiracy. One is Lola Camonte, a hostess, lobbyist and fixer. She recounts President Kegan asking her about appointing a member of organized crime to the Court of St. James's as the U.S. ambassador to Great Britain. Also coming up is "Joe Diamond", a fictional representation of the Mob-connected Dallas nightclub owner Jack Ruby, who shot and killed Kennedy's accused assassin Lee Harvey Oswald.

Numerous intertwined threads variously implicate organizations and individuals, or are proffered to throw Nick off the trail. Among them are the Jewish/Italian-American Mob, figures related to Cuba, even possible domestic police connections. Only at the end, when Nick meets with his vicious and perverse Joseph P. Kennedy-like 'father, is the truth revealed - generically pointing the finger at a "system" of interrelated interests embracing organized crime, the U.S. covert world, big business, and political fixers.

== Film adaptation ==
In 1979, a film adaptation of the novel was released, Winter Kills, which starred Jeff Bridges and John Huston.

== See also ==
- Assassinations in fiction
