= The Manchurian Candidate =

1959 novel by Richard Condon

- First edition
- Author: Richard Condon
- Cover artist: Bernard Krigstein
- Language: English
- Genre: Thriller novel
- Publisher: McGraw-Hill
- Publication date: April 27, 1959
- Publication place: United States
- Media type: Print (hardback)
- Pages: 311
- OCLC: 52409655
- Dewey Decimal: 813/.54 21
- LC Class: PS3553.O487 M36 2003

The Manchurian Candidate (1959), by Richard Condon, is a political thriller about the son of a prominent U.S. political family who is brainwashed into being an unwitting assassin for a Communist conspiracy. The novel has been adapted into a feature film twice; the first is The Manchurian Candidate (1962), which deals with anti-communist hysteria in U.S. politics, and the second is The Manchurian Candidate (2004), which deals with corporate interference in the U.S. government.

== Plot summary ==
Major Ben Marco, Sergeant Raymond Shaw, and their infantry platoon are captured by a Soviet commando unit during the Korean War, in 1952. The captured POWs are taken to Manchuria, in China, where they are brainwashed to believe that Shaw saved their lives in combat — for which Shaw is awarded the Medal of Honor.

After the war, Major Marco, now working as an intelligence officer, is transferred to New York and moves in with Shaw, now working as a journalist. The brainwashing had convinced Marco that Shaw is a good friend and wonderful human being, but Marco knows in the back of his mind that it isn't true, that Shaw is "impossible to like." Marco has a knack for meeting women, and Shaw's apartment is suddenly filled with girls day and night. Shaw sleeps with some of the women; his captors had given him a "gift" of releasing his formerly-suppressed libido. However, Shaw still pines for his true love, Jocelyn Jordan, whom he met the summer before going to Korea. Jocelyn is the daughter of Senator Thomas Jordan, a liberal opponent of Shaw's stepfather, the anti-Communist demagogue Senator Johnny Iselin. Shaw's ambitious mother Eleanor, who is the driving force behind her second husband's career, had therefore sabotaged her son's relationship with Jocelyn.

Some time later, Marco begins suffering a recurring nightmare in which the seated platoon members are surrounded by a group of sweet old ladies who had been a part of their brainwashing. One of the ladies tells Shaw to murder two of his platoon comrades, which he does. The backdrop with the old ladies changes back and forth between them and Chinese/Soviet intelligence officials. When Marco learns that another of the platoon's soldiers has been suffering the same nightmare, he starts looking into why this is happening.

Some Communist officials arrive in New York to re-activate their conditioned assassin. The trigger phrase is "Why don't you pass the time by playing a little solitaire?" Shaw will then play cards until he turns over the queen of diamonds, which is the trigger card bringing him to his fully conditioned state. At this point Shaw, who is known to be a crack marksman, can be commanded to perform any act and will have no memory of it later. As a test, Shaw is assigned to kill his immediate superior at the newspaper, and does so.

Marco's nightmares worsen and he is recalled to Washington and put on sick leave. On a train, he meets a more permanent love interest, Eugenie Rose Cheyney. Marco confesses the whole story to Rose, who urges him to contact the FBI. At the FBI, Marco is able to identify high Soviet and Chinese officials from his dreams. His story now believed, Marco is reinstated to active duty and put in charge of a task force to investigate the matter. Shaw accompanies his mother on a publicity-seeking tour of Europe, during which two prominent politicians are mysteriously killed. Marco's group conducts an in-depth investigation and determines with little doubt that Shaw's medal is a fraud and that the platoon was brainwashed. However, the goal of the plan remains elusive. The break comes in May 1960, when Marco is late to a meeting with Shaw at a New York bar. The loquacious bartender has told an anecdote that happens to include the phrase "Why don't you pass the time by playing a little solitaire?" Observing Shaw's bizarre behavior afterwards, Marco comes to realize that the solitaire game, and the queen of diamonds in particular, is Shaw's trigger. He orders packs of cards consisting entirely of the queen of diamonds.

Shaw is excitedly anticipating the return of Jocelyn Jordan, now a widow, from abroad. At a party at the Iselins' vacation home on Long Island, Shaw's mother calls him aside and asks him to play solitaire, revealing herself to be his American operator. However, Mrs. Iselin is called away briefly, during which time Jocelyn Jordan enters the room costumed as the Queen of Diamonds. The costume breaks his mother's control, and Shaw falls into Jocelyn's arms for the first time. The two depart and get married quickly, going on an ecstatic honeymoon in the Caribbean while both the Communist plotters and Marco's task force frantically search for Shaw. Upon his return, however, Shaw again encounters his mother and the solitaire deck. She gives him a new order: he must assassinate Senator Jordan, who has threatened to block Johnny Iselin's nomination to the vice-presidency at the convention next week. Shaw carries out the assassination, and also kills Jocelyn, who happens to witness the shooting, in accordance with his orders to leave no witnesses alive.

The distraught Shaw calls Marco, who meets him in the Central Park with his force pack consisting only of queens of diamonds. With a full layout of queens on the table, Marco is able to penetrate to the depth of Shaw's conditioning and learns all of the details of the plot. Shaw's mother will arrange for Johnny Iselin to be named the vice-presidential nominee. On the night of the acceptance speeches, Shaw must shoot the presidential nominee dead and also shoot Iselin, though only to wound him. Iselin will then rise to the podium with a rousing speech that will sweep him into the White House with dictatorial powers. Shaw's mother has also revealed to him that, after she achieves power, she plans to take revenge on the Communists for double-crossing her by sending her own son as the assassin. Marco gives Shaw new instructions, which he does not reveal to the other members of the task force.

One of the conspirators manages to separate Shaw from Marco and brings him to the convention hall where, dressed as a priest, Shaw ascends to a spotlight booth with a Soviet-made rifle. Marco's group is staking out the convention, but Marco delays pursuing Shaw until the crucial moment of the acceptance speech arrives. Instead of shooting the nominee, Shaw kills his mother and Iselin. Marco then enters the booth with a pack of cards, and a few moments later a third gunshot is heard. Raymond Shaw's unhappy life is over.

The book's title refers not to the brainwashed assassin Raymond Shaw, but to Senator Johnny Iselin, who is clearly a caricature of the anti-Communist demagogue of the early 1950s, Senator Joseph R. McCarthy. The basic premise of the story is that Iselin's achievement of nomination to national office was the direct result of a Communist plot hatched in Manchuria, and Iselin is thus the "Manchurian Candidate."

== Film adaptations ==
The book has twice been adapted into a feature film of the same title. The 1962 adaptation, considered a classic of the political thriller genre, was directed by John Frankenheimer, and starred Laurence Harvey as Shaw, Frank Sinatra as Marco, and Angela Lansbury as Eleanor in an Academy Award-nominated performance. The 2004 adaptation was directed by Jonathan Demme, and starred Liev Schreiber as Shaw, Denzel Washington as Marco, and Meryl Streep as Eleanor. It was generally well received by critics, and moderately successful at the box office. The film updated the conflict and setting to the Persian Gulf War in 1991, had a U.S. corporation (called "Manchurian Global") as the perpetrator of the brainwashing and conspiracy instead of foreign Communist groups, and dropped the Johnny Iselin character in favor of making both Shaw and his mother elected politicians.

Both adaptations modify several elements of the book. The book spends more time describing the brainwashers and the facility in Manchuria where the Americans were held. The head of the project grants Shaw a "gift"; after his brainwashing, he becomes quite sexually active, in contrast to his reserved nature beforehand where he had not even kissed his love interest, Jocelyn Jordan. The novel devotes considerably more attention to the activities and backstory of Senator Iselin, making even clearer than in the 1962 movie that Iselin is a fictionalized version of Senator Joseph R. McCarthy (the Iselin character was dropped from the 2004 film). In the novel, Mrs. Iselin and her son travel abroad, where she uses him to kill various political figures. Rosie, Marco's love interest, is the ex-fiancée of one of his associates handling the Shaw case for the FBI, making things between the couple tense. The movie adaptations also all but omit the novel's portrayal of incest between Shaw and his mother, only hinting at it with a mouth-to-mouth kiss.

As a child, Mrs. Iselin was sexually abused by her father, but fell in love with him and idolized him after his early death. Towards the end of the book, as Shaw is hypnotized by the Queen of Diamonds, he reminds her of her father and they sleep together. The 1962 version does not state outright the political affiliation of Senators Iselin and Jordan (implied to be Republicans), although in the 2004 film the equivalent characters are Democrats. According to David Willis McCullough, Senator Iselin is modeled on Republican senator Joseph McCarthy and, according to Condon, Shaw's mother is based on McCarthy's counsel Roy Cohn. The 1962 film implies that Raymond decided on his own to kill his mother and Iselin whereas the novel implies that this was the result of Marco changing Raymond's conditioning.

== Other adaptations ==
A stage adaptation by John Lahr opened in London in 1991, and has since played in the United States. Kevin Puts has adapted the work into an opera. His opera The Manchurian Candidate premiered in March 2015 at the Minnesota Opera. It has been performed by the Austin Opera and at the Seagle Festival in the Adirondacks of New York.

== Alleged plagiarism ==
In 1998, software developer C. J. Silverio noted that at least one three-paragraph passage from the novel seemed to be adapted from Robert Graves's 1934 novel I, Claudius. The passage in question describes Johnny Iselin's relationship with Eleanor in very similar terms to the way the marriage of Augustus and Livia is described in Graves's novel.

== In popular culture ==
A copy of The Manchurian Candidate is a major plot point in the 1999 novel False Memory by Dean Koontz. The novel's title is referenced in many TV shows:

- Gravity Falls episode "The Stanchurian Candidate", aired as part of the series' second season.
- Rick and Morty's season 3 episode "The Rickchurian Mortydate".
- Family Guy's season 21 episode "The Munchurian Candidate".
- Bob's Burgers' season 5 episode "The Millie-churian Candidate".
- All Hail King Julien's season 4 episode "The Panchurian Candidate"
- Salvation's season 2 episode "The Manchurian Candidate"
- Psych’s season 7 episode 10 “The Santa Barbarian Candidate”

In the season 4 episode "Chuck versus Phase Three" of the TV series Chuck, the protagonist compares his experience of remembering dreams to The Manchurian Candidate. In season 2 episode 3 of The Eric Andre Show, during a segment with Downtown Julie Brown, Eric Andre reveals that he programmed Hannibal Buress to be his "Manchurian Candidate" before using his trigger phrase to force Hannibal into shooting a backstage crew member. In the 2016 MCU movie Captain America: Civil War, Tony Stark nicknames Bucky Barnes, who has been turned into the brainwashed assassin known as the Winter Soldier, "Manchurian Candidate". According to Nadine Dorries in 2023, former UK Prime Minister Boris Johnson viewed then-current UK Prime Minister Rishi Sunak as being "like a Manchurian Candidate" installed by Dominic Cummings.

Science Fiction author Poul Anderson took up the basic plot element of The Manchurian Candidate in the novel Game of Empire – one of Anderson's far-future spy thriller series, where the dashing Dominic Flandry, secret agent of the star-spanning Terran Empire, confronts the agents of the rival Merseian Empire. Among other exploits, Flandry foils an audacious Merseian plot to place a Merseian agent on the Terran Imperial throne itself.

Also referenced in Slipknot's 1999 song, Wait and Bleed. The line is, "I'm a victim Manchurian Candidate."

Accusations of individuals being a 'Manchurian candidate' are sometimes levelled in politics to infer internal influence from China or communism.

== See also ==
- List of assassinations in fiction
- Conspiracy thriller
