= Poison Ivy (film series) =

Erotic thriller film series

- Created by: Melissa Goddard
- Original work: Poison Ivy (1992)
- Owner: Warner Bros. Entertainment (via New Line Cinema)
- Years: 1992–2008

Films and television
- Film(s): Poison Ivy (1992)
- Television film(s): Poison Ivy: The Secret Society (2008)
- Direct-to-video: Poison Ivy II: Lily (1996); Poison Ivy: The New Seduction (1997)

Poison Ivy is an erotic thriller film series that consists of four films. The first three films in the series deal with the implications of an emotionally neglected, sexually assertive young woman's fascination with her best friend's father, and how her desire for him affects multiple individuals who fall under her influence. The fourth film in the series is only thematically linked to the first three, dealing with a secret society of young women dedicated to obtaining control over powerful men through seduction. Although the first film in the series received critical acclaim at the Sundance Festival and developed a cult status through word of mouth marketing, the next two films were released direct to video and received a generally negative reception, with the fourth premiering as a made-for-television movie.

== Films ==
Film	U.S. release date	Director(s)	Screenwriter(s)	Story by	Producer(s)
Poison Ivy	May 8, 1992	Katt Shea	Andy Ruben & Katt Shea	Melissa Goddard	Andy Ruben
Poison Ivy II: Lily	January 16, 1996	Anne Goursaud	Chloe King	—N/a	Paul Hertzberg & Catalaine Knell
Poison Ivy: The New Seduction	May 20, 1997	Kurt Voss	Karen Kelly	—N/a	Catalaine Knell
Poison Ivy: The Secret Society	July 27, 2008	Jason Hreno	Liz Maverick, Peter Sullivan & Michael Worth	—N/a	Lindsay McAdam

=== Poison Ivy (1992) ===
Poison Ivy (1992) - Sylvie, the kind but sheltered daughter of a wealthy family, meets and befriends Ivy, a lower-class girl with a troubled background, and invites her home. There, Ivy becomes fascinated with Sylvie's caring father, Darrel, who represents the love and stability Ivy has sought all of her life. After Ivy sets out to seduce him, her friendship with Sylvie is tested, leading to tragic consequences.

=== Poison Ivy II: Lily (1996) ===
Poison Ivy II: Lily (1996) - Years after the events of the first film, sexually frustrated young virgin Lily discovers Ivy's diary, recounting her own sexual awakenings and philosophies regarding seduction. Lily begins modeling her own life after the lessons she learns from Ivy's writing, though the transformation has unforeseen consequences.

=== Poison Ivy: The New Seduction (1997) ===
Poison Ivy: The New Seduction (1997) - Ivy's heretofore unseen sister, Violet, insinuates herself into the lives of the family who employed their mother as a housekeeper, intent on seeking revenge for a childhood tragedy.

=== Poison Ivy: The Secret Society (2008) ===
Poison Ivy: The Secret Society (2008) - A new student at an elite university discovers the existence of a secret society of young women intent on obtaining power by seducing influential men.

== Cast and crew ==
=== Principal cast ===
Key
- A ^{Y} indicates the actor portrayed the role of a younger version of the character.
- A ^{C} indicates a cameo appearance.
- A ^{U} indicates an uncredited appearance.
- A dark gray cell indicates the character was not in the film.

Characters	Films			
Characters	Poison Ivy	Poison Ivy II: Lily	Poison Ivy: The New Seduction	Poison Ivy: The Secret Society
Characters	1992	1996	1997	2008
Ivy	Drew Barrymore	Alyssa Milano	Jaime Pressly Sabrinah Christie^{YC}	Shawna Waldron
Sylvie Cooper	Sara Gilbert			
Darryl Cooper	Tom Skerritt			
Georgie Cooper	Cheryl Ladd			
Guy	Leonardo DiCaprio			
Lily Leonetti		Alyssa Milano		
Gredin		Johnathon Schaech		
Donald Falk		Xander Berkeley		
Angela Falk		Belinda Bauer		
Daphna Falk		Camilla Belle		
Violet			Jaime Pressly Tenaya Erich^{Y}	
Joy Greer			Megan Edwards Trishalee Hardy^{Y}	
Ivan Greer			Michael Des Barres	
Michael			Greg Vaughan	
Azalea Berges				Shawna Waldron
Danielle "Daisy" Brooks				Miriam McDonald
Blake Graves				Ryan Kennedy
Professor Andrew Graves				Greg Evigan
Isabel Turner				Crystal Lowe
Will Mitchell				Brendan Penny

=== Additional crew ===
Crew/Detail	Film			
Crew/Detail	Poison Ivy	Poison Ivy II: Lily	Poison Ivy: The New Seduction	Poison Ivy: The Secret Society
Crew/Detail	1992	1996	1997	2008
Director	Katt Shea	Anne Goursaud	Kurt Voss	Jason Hreno
Producer(s)	Andy Ruben	Paul Hertzberg; Catalaine Knell	Catalaine Knell	Lindsay McAdam
Writer(s)	Screenplay by Andy Ruben; Katt Shea; Story by Melissa Goddard	Chloe King	Karen Kelly	Liz Maverick; Peter Sullivan; Michael Worth
Composer(s)	David Michael Frank	Joseph Williams	Reg Powell	Gregory Tripi; Kyle Kenneth Batter
Cinematographer	Phedon Papamichael	Suki Medencevic	Feliks Parnell	Kamal Derkaoui
Editor(s)	Gina Mittelman	Terilyn A. Shropshire	John Rosenberg	Asim Nuraney
Production companies	MG Entertainment	CineTel Pictures; MG Entertainment	CineTel Pictures; MG Entertainment	CineTel Films; Insight Film Studios
Distributing company	New Line Cinema	New Line Home Video	New Line Home Video	New Line Home Entertainment
Release date	May 8, 1992	January 16, 1996	May 20, 1997	July 27, 2008
Running time	88 minutes	102 minutes	94 minutes	95 minutes
