= Nightlight (disambiguation) =

A nightlight is a small, usually electrical, light source placed for comfort or convenience in indoor dark areas or areas that become dark at certain times.

Nightlight, Nightlite, Night light, Nightlighting, or night-lighting may also refer to:

== Film, television, and literature ==
- Nightlight (2003 film), a television film starring Shannen Doherty
- NightLights, a 2014 multi-award-winning film starring Shawna Waldron
- Nightlight (2015 film), an American supernatural thriller film
- Night Light (TV series), a 2016 South Korean television series
- "Night Light", a 2007 SpongeBob SquarePants episode
- Night Light, a 1953 novel by Douglass Wallop
- "Night Lights" (Criminal Minds), a 2018 episode
- Night Light, an alias of Kamala Khan in the Marvel Cinematic Universe

== Albums ==
- Night Light (2nd Chapter of Acts album), a 1985 album
- Night Light (Kevin Hearn and Thin Buckle album), a 2004 album
- Night Light (White Lies album), a 2025 album
- Night Lights (Elliott Murphy album), a 1975 album
- Night Lights (Gerry Mulligan album), a 1963 album
- Night Lights (Gene Ammons album), a 1970 album
- Night Lights (Punchline album), a 2009 album
- Night-Light (Miyuki Nakajima album), a 2012 album
- Nightlight, a 2014 album by Zee Avi
- Nightlights (album), a 2010 album by Jimmy Needham
- Nightlight (EP), a 2006 EP by Megan Washington and Sean Foran

== Songs ==
- "Night Lights" (Nat King Cole song), a 1956 song
- "Night Light" (Jessie Ware song), 2012
- "Night Light" (the Rions song), 2021
- "Night Lights", a 1963 song by Gerry Mulligan
- "Night Light", a 2002 song on the Aesop Rock EP "Daylight"
- "Night Light", a 2005 song by Sleater-Kinney from their album "The Woods"
- "Nightlite", a 2006 song by Bonobo from his album "Days to Come"
- "Night Light", a 2014 song by Pink Floyd from their album "The Endless River"
- "Nightlight", a 2015 song by Silversun Pickups from their album "Better Nature"
- "Night Light", a 2017 song by Sara Evans from her album "Words"
- "Night Light", a 2022 song by Laufey from her album "Everything I Know About Love"

== Other uses ==
- Nightlight Christian Adoptions, an adoption agency specializing in embryo adoptions
- Analog nightlight, a period permitting analog transmissions during the U.S. changeover to digital television
- Night light (Windows), a feature of the Windows 10 Version 1703 Creators Update which shifts the color temperature of the display to a warm color at night

== See also ==
- Dark mode
