= Poison Ivy: The New Seduction =

1997 film by Kurt Voss

- Official DVD cover
- Directed by: Kurt Voss
- Written by: Karen Kelly
- Produced by: Catalaine Knell
- Starring: Jaime Pressly; Michael Des Barres; Megan Edwards; Greg Vaughan; Susan Tyrrell; Athena Massey; Susan Ward; Shanna Moakler
- Cinematography: Feliks Parnell
- Edited by: John Rosenberg
- Music by: Reg Powell
- Production companies: CineTel Pictures; MG Entertainment; New Line Cinema
- Distributed by: New Line Home Video
- Release date: May 20, 1997
- Running time: 94 minutes
- Country: United States
- Language: English

Poison Ivy: The New Seduction is a 1997 American direct-to-video erotic thriller film directed by Kurt Voss and stars Jaime Pressly. It is a sequel to the 1996 film Poison Ivy II: Lily and the third installment of the Poison Ivy film series. The film was released by New Line Home Video on May 20, 1997.

== Plot ==
In 1985, Ivan and Catherine Greer live with their 9-year-old daughter Joy, their housekeeper Rebecca (whom Ivan is having an affair with), and her two daughters Ivy (9) and Violet (8). The three young girls live as sisters, but Ivy has gotten bored by their childish games. She hears someone pull up to the house and sees that Ivan has unexpectedly returned home early. Aware of her mother's new affair with the pool boy, Ivy excitedly states, "There's going to be fireworks." Ivan catches Rebecca in bed with the pool boy and the two men briefly scuffle. Afterwards, as Ivan tends to his wounds, he and Rebecca begin a loud argument that is overheard by Catherine. Upon learning of their affair, she immediately evicts Rebecca and her children.

In 1996, Catherine has since died and Violet, who is now a beautiful young woman, returns to the Greer home and reunites with Joy. Violet states that she is looking for a summertime residence while working as a waitress and is planning to attend a local junior college. Joy invites Violet to stay with them in the late Catherine's room. Joy is an amateur tennis star and engaged to her boyfriend Michael, who attends Yale University and will be working as an intern for Ivan's bank. During a late night party, Violet feels isolated and ridiculed by Joy's ivy league friends, so she excuses herself for a late shift at work. Afterwards, Michael takes Joy to her room and initiates foreplay, only to be rejected. As Michael is on his way out, he runs into Violet, who has just returned from work and is dressed up in a leather outfit. Michael briefly questions Violet's job as a waitress, but she brushes it off and states the two have gotten off on the wrong foot. Taking advantage of his sexual frustration, Violet quickly seduces Michael and performs oral sex on him.

Violet's obsession with Joy motivates her to destroy all of her other relationships. When her tennis partner Jaimie comes over to the house for practice, Violet spikes their drinks. Joy and Jaimie drunkenly attempt to play tennis but eventually pass out. Violet then places Jaimie in her bed, undresses and handcuffs her, then cuddles up to her. Jaimie wakes up and, convinced she and Violet had just engaged in sex, flees the house horrified. Michael is Violet's next target. After once again getting rejected by Joy, Violet finds him sulking by the pool. She convinces him that the real reason Joy rejects his sexual advances is because she's unfaithful. Violet then gives him a small bottle of cocaine, to reignite his former addiction, and the two of them have sex. Ivan is the next to be seduced, with Violet skinny dipping while he's watching and dressing up in his late wife's clothing. The Greers' new housekeeper, Mrs. B, quickly becomes suspicious of Violet and makes enemies with her while attempting to thwart her schemes. She is later killed by Violet after she threatened to expose her.

Michael seeks out Violet and angrily confronts her after losing his internship at the bank due to the drugs she gave him. He also did some research on her, finding out she never enrolled in a local college, as well as the dark history of both her mother and her older sister Ivy. Michael suggests that she pack up her things and leave before he confesses everything to Joy when they meet up at the house later that day. Violet tricks him into coming over earlier than planned, telling him Joy actually planned to stand him up and meet with another boy thirty minutes before he's supposed to show up. When Michael arrives at the Greers' house, Violet knocks him unconscious and injects him with a large dose of drugs, killing him. Joy returns from a failed tennis match and is also upset that Michael never met up with her. She gets a call that informs her of Michael's death, and when she goes to tell her father, she walks in on him and Violet engaging in BDSM activities. After Joy flees the house, Ivan tells Violet she must leave. She accuses him of repeating the abandonment of her mother, then hides the drugs for Ivan's heart condition and disables the phones. As he tries to drive away, Ivan discovers he's trapped in the garage. Once he passes out, Violet turns on the car so the room will fill up with carbon monoxide.

Angry, Joy decides to return to the house only to see that the power is out. She searches around until she discovers Mrs. B's body. She then runs into Violet, who demands that Joy dress up with her and play like they did when they were children. Violet plans for them to commit suicide by drinking poison. Joy resists and they begin fighting. Joy briefly gets away and races out of the room to the stairway, shouting for help. Violet resumes her attack, but is spun around by Joy and begins to lose her balance at the top of the stairs. Joy grasps Violet's pearl necklace to keep her from falling and pleads with her to reach out and take her hand. Instead, Violet closes her eyes and stretches her arms above her head. The necklace shatters and Violet falls down the stairs to her death. Joy is initially stunned, but she calmly exits the mansion with a newfound confidence and a brief smile, and leaves to start a new life elsewhere.

== Cast ==
- Jaime Pressly as Violet
  - Tenaya Erich as Violet - Age 8
- Megan Edwards as Joy Greer
  - Trishalee Hardy as Joy - Age 9
- Michael Des Barres as Ivan Greer
- Greg Vaughan as Michael
- Susan Tyrrell as Mrs. B
- Sabrinah Christie as Ivy - Age 9
- Merete Van Kamp as Catherine Greer
- Gregory Vignolle as Alvaro
- Athena Massey as Rebecca
- Shanna Moakler as Jaimie
- Terence Paul Winter as Ethan
- Susan Ward as Sandy, Girl at Party
- Michael McLafferty as Scott, Boy at Party

== Production ==
It was based on a script by Karen Kelly, and directed by Kurt Voss, who is known for his work in erotic thriller films and who has also worked as a musician. The film would be shot around Los Angeles, and Voss was the franchise's first male director, as the previous two entries had been directed by women. It is one of the earliest roles of actress Jaime Pressly, who played Violet. In a 2008 interview, she reflected on this role and her role in the 1998 Jerry Springer film Ringmaster, saying "they paid the bills". In another 2008 interview, she also said that during this time, she was more focused on gaining experience than appearing in credible films which would help further her career, saying "It's a Southern work-ethic kind of thing: I wanted to learn about everything, and the best way to do that is to work on guerrilla-type films. That's what I thought I was doing: starting from the ground up." She added that appearing in such a sexually explicit film wasn't a good career move for her in the long term, since it differed from the later roles she did. This was also one of the first roles of Shanna Moakler, who plays a friend of Joy. Moakler went on to marry Blink-182 drummer Travis Barker, but divorced him, and in 2023 she started dating Greg Vaughan, who played Joy's boyfriend in this film.

Prior to doing this film, Moakler had earlier met Vaughan in 1994, when they were both aspiring models in Miami. At the beginning of the film, Violet and Joy are portrayed as children by Tenaya Erich and Trishalee Hardy, while the original film's antagonist Ivy is also portrayed as a child by Sabrinah Christie. This was Erich's only role, although Christie also had a minor role in the second Ace Ventura film in 1995, and Hardy had several roles between 1993–97, and in 1997 appeared in the theatrical films 'Til There Was You and Washington Square, the direct to video film Little Ghost and the television film Friends 'Til the End. The opening scenes of the movie have topless shots and depictions of sexual foreplay, as well as sexually explicit dialogue, and all scenes involving the three children were filmed separately from these scenes.

== Music ==
The film's closing theme "Now" was performed by Canadian actress Saffron Henderson, who has primarily worked as a voice actress in Vancouver, British Columbia. At the time this film was made, she was also voicing Gohan in the original English dub of Dragon Ball Z.

== Release ==
After its initial VHS release by Warner's New Line Home Entertainment, the film was re-released onto DVD during the late 1990s and 2000s. It was also released on LaserDisc by Image Entertainment, with the LaserDisc released at the same time as the VHS release, before the subsequent DVD releases. Beginning in August 1997, the film started airing on cable television in the United States, and it would continue to be aired heavily in the following years.

In 2019, it was released on Blu-ray for the first time, as part of Shout! Factory's The Poison Ivy Collection (1992-2008).

== Reception ==
In a June 1997 review for Entertainment Weekly, J.R. Taylor gave the film a D+ rating, and described it as "a dim-bulb remake of the flashy Drew Barrymore original". John Hartl of The Seattle Times also had a mixed review in June 1997, writing that "the 1992 Drew Barrymore/Tom Skerrit theatrical movie has inspired one of those erotic-thriller video franchises that never ends." The book Video Movie Guide 1998, by Mick Martin and Marsha Porter, called it a "pointless sequel", adding that it "covers pretty much the same territory as the previous two entries in this sagging franchise." It was included in the 2007 book Mr. Skin's Skintastic Video Guide: The 501 Greatest Movies for Sex & Nudity on DVD. The film was also included in John Kenneth Muir's 2011 book Horror Films of the 1990s. Muir wrote that, "The New Seduction is the sleaziest and raunchiest of the Poison Ivy films, and on those terms, [is] a lot of wicked fun." He also noted that, "after the navel-gazing Poison Ivy: Lilly (1996), the franchise returns to its horror roots here."

== Sequel ==
A sequel titled Poison Ivy: The Secret Society, was released in 2008.
