= Poison Ivy: The Secret Society =

2008 television film directed by Jason Hreno

- Promotional release poster
- Written by: Liz Maverick; Peter Sullivan; Michael Worth
- Directed by: Jason Hreno
- Starring: Shawna Waldron; Miriam McDonald; Ryan Kennedy; Greg Evigan
- Music by: Gregory Tripi; Kyle Kenneth Batter
- Country of origin: United States
- Original language: English

Production
- Producer: Lindsay McAdam
- Cinematography: Kamal Derkaoui
- Editor: Asim Nuraney
- Running time: 95 minutes
- Production companies: Hush Productions Inc.; Insight Film Studios; New Line Television

Original release
- Network: Lifetime
- Release: July 27, 2008

Related
- Poison Ivy: The New Seduction (1997)

Poison Ivy: The Secret Society is a 2008 American made-for-television erotic thriller drama film directed by Jason Hreno. It is a standalone sequel to the 1997 film Poison Ivy: The New Seduction and the fourth and final installment of the Poison Ivy film series. The film premiered on Lifetime on July 27, 2008.

== Plot ==
Recently orphaned country girl Danielle "Daisy" Brooks leaves her ranch and her boyfriend William behind to pursue her college degree, and transfers to Berkshire College, an elite New England private university haunted by the mysterious death of a young college student, Alexis Baldwin. Her first week as a college freshman makes a big impression, not only attracting the notice of the dean's handsome son Blake, but also singling her out for a prestigious internship in Washington D.C.

Blake quickly becomes infatuated with Daisy and asks her out on a date; much to the disapproval of his father, Andrew Graves.

Daisy's arrival also piques the interest of the Ivy Society, a close-knit secretive sisterhood to whom the lucrative scholarship is traditionally granted. The head of the Ivies, an attractive and ambitious student named Azalea Berges with a long history of truancy and illicit affairs with teachers, breaks into Blake's home, offering sexual favors in exchange for his help in boosting her chances with the internship.

Upon learning that one of the considered candidates is Daisy, she invites her to join the Ivies. Daisy (initially) refuses, preferring to continue her studies and consummate her relationship with Blake. But when an error in her tuition payments threatens to erase her name from the college system, she is left with no other choice but to agree. Late one night, she and two other students take part in an initiation ritual at the Ivy household. Pledging allegiance to the sisterhood, they drink from drugged ceremonial wine, are stripped naked and tattooed with the Ivy insignia.

Initially, Azalea and the Ivies seem willing to help Daisy with anything she needs, outfitting her with a fashionable new wardrobe, solving her financial issues and introducing her to a popular new lifestyle. But Daisy's new social status distances her from her roommate Magenta Hart, who is still mourning the death of her friend Alexis. She is awarded a place in the scholarship by Dean Elisabeth Graves, but breaks up with Blake for ignoring her after they slept together.

Blake, distracted by his relationship with Daisy, fails to honor his agreement with Azalea. Having recorded Blake and Daisy's first night of lovemaking in secret, she and the Ivy sisters leak the video onto the internet and set fire to Blake's sports car. With her reputation destroyed, Daisy soon gets wind of the Ivies' true nature as a power-hungry group of sirens who manipulate men to their advantage and employ blackmail and seduction to achieve their aims, wishing to use the government internship to gain a political foothold in society. She also learns that Alexis Baldwin's death was not an accident and is one of a long history of killings that have been covered up by the dean.

Azalea is shocked when Magenta takes her place in the list of candidates applying for the scholarship, and, furious at Blake's deceit, declares war on the Graves family. She threatens to destroy William's land deed when Daisy attempts to extract herself from the clique and tasks her with a test of loyalty. Dressed in provocative lingerie, Daisy breaks into the administration building to infiltrate Professor Graves's office, but upon learning she is to have sex with him, balks at the suggestion and breaks rank. Having failed to make Daisy one of her own, Azalea seduces Graves herself, bashes the back of his head on a sharp ornament during sex and framing Daisy for the killing.

A police investigation is launched following Graves's murder and Daisy becomes the prime suspect; due to her extensive interaction with the Graves family. Facing jail time, Daisy makes amends with Blake and upon discovering that the Ivies have been manipulating her all along, visits Azalea's home to seek solace. Through desperate pleas of forgiveness, she manages to get Azalea to admit her murderous behavior and the attempt to set her up. Discovering that the confession has been recorded, Azalea attacks Daisy in a rage with a sword and a fight ensues in the Ivy swimming pool. Daisy pretends to drown, overpowers Azalea from behind and knocks her head on the pool steps. Having admitted her part in the cover-up, Dean Graves leads the police to the scene, where Daisy submits the recording proving her innocence and an unconscious Azalea is taken into custody.

Following the ordeal, Daisy is given the rest of the semester off. With four years of a prestigious scholarship ahead, she leaves Berkshire campus for the summer and returns to her farm in Iowa to resume her relationship with Will. As the two reunite, her Ivy tattoo is shown to now depict a daisy.

== Cast ==
- Miriam McDonald as Danielle "Daisy" Brooks
- Shawna Waldron as Azalea Berges
- Ryan Kennedy as Blake Graves
- Crystal Lowe as Isabel Turner
- Andrea Whitburn as Magenta Hart
- Greg Evigan as Professor Andrew Graves
- Catherine Hicks as Dean Elisabeth Graves
- Brendan Penny as Will Mitchell

== Release ==
=== Home media ===
The film was released on DVD and Blu-ray in an unrated cut on January 20, 2009. It contains five minutes of extra footage not shown on TV.

== Reception ==
=== Critical response ===
Matt Brunson at Film Frenzy called it "yawn-inducing" and gave it 1.5 out of 4. Kevin Carr of 7M Pictures wrote: "I can't help but feel they're just trying to give us a sexy girl version of The Skulls."
