= New Line Cinema =

American media production company

New Line Productions, Inc.
- Logo used since 2024
- Trade name: New Line Cinema
- Formerly: New Line Cinema Corporation (1967-1993)
- Type: Subsidiary
- Industry: Film; Television
- Founded: June 18, 1967; 59 years ago in New York City, United States
- Founder: Robert Shaye
- Defunct: February 28, 2008; 18 years ago (as a stand-alone studio)
- Fate: Folded into Warner Bros., currently active as a unit of Warner Bros. Pictures
- Successor: Warner Bros. Pictures
- Headquarters: 4000 Warner Blvd, Burbank, California, United States
- Key people: Richard Brener (president and CCO)
- Products: Motion pictures Television programs
- Owner: Skydance: Turner Broadcasting System (1994-1996); Time Warner (1996-2018); AT&T (2018-2022); Warner Bros. Discovery (2022-2026)
- Parent: Warner Bros. Entertainment: Turner Entertainment Co. (1994–1996); Time Warner (1996–2001); AOL Time Warner (2001–2003); Time Warner (2003–2008); Warner Bros. Entertainment (2008–2022); Warner Bros. Motion Picture Group (2022–2026)
- Divisions: Former divisions: New Line Television (1988–2008); Fine Line Features (1991–2005); New Line Home Entertainment (1990–2010); New Line Records (2000–2010)
- Website: www.skydance.com/about/brands/new-line-cinema

New Line Productions, Inc., doing business as New Line Cinema, is an American film and television production company owned by Skydance. The studio was founded on June 18, 1967, by Robert Shaye in New York City, as a foreign and art film distributor. In 1994, New Line was acquired by the Turner Broadcasting System, which in turn was acquired by Time Warner in 1996. In 2008, New Line was folded into Warner Bros. Pictures. Prior to the integration into Warner Bros. Pictures, its headquarters were located in Los Angeles, California at 116 N Robertson Blvd. Since then, New Line Cinema operates out of offices at Warner Bros. Studios in Burbank.

New Line Cinema is one of the four live-action film studios within the Warner Bros. Motion Picture Group, the others being Warner Bros. Pictures, Warner Bros. Clockwork, and a minority stake in Spyglass Media Group. The studio has been nicknamed "The House that Freddy Built" due to the success of the Nightmare on Elm Street horror film series. However, its most successful property was the 2000s film adaptation of The Lord of the Rings trilogy by J. R. R. Tolkien with considerable commercial success and numerous Academy Awards.

== History ==
=== From founding to 1984 ===
Logo used from 1967 to 1987

New Line Cinema was established in 1967 by the then 27-year-old Robert Shaye as a film distribution company, supplying foreign and art films for college campuses in the United States. Shaye operated New Line Cinema's offices out of his apartment at 14th Street and Second Avenue in New York City. One of the company's early successes was its distribution of the 1936 anti-cannabis propaganda film Reefer Madness, which became a cult hit on American college campuses in the early 1970s. New Line also released many classic foreign-language films, like Immoral Tales (1973), Stay As You Are (1978), and Get Out Your Handkerchiefs (1978), which became the first New Line film to win an Oscar (for Foreign Language Film). The studio also released many of the films of John Waters, including Pink Flamingos (1972), Female Trouble (1974), and Desperate Living (1977).

In 1976, New Line Cinema secured funding to produce its first full-length feature, Stunts (1977), directed by Mark L. Lester. Although not considered a critical success, the film performed well commercially on the international market and on television.

In 1980, Shaye's law school classmate Michael Lynne became outside counsel and adviser to the company and renegotiated its debt. Lynne would later join the board of directors in 1983.

In 1982, the company relocated to a larger office at 38th Street and Eighth Avenue in Gotham.

New Line Cinema expanded its film production in the early 1980s, producing or co-producing films including Polyester (1981), directed by John Waters, and horror film Alone in the Dark (1982). Polyester was one of the first films to introduce a novelty cinema experience named Odorama, where audience members were provided with a set of "scratch and sniff" cards to be used at specific times during the film, which provided an additional sensory connection to the viewed image.

In 1983, Bryanston Distributing Company, the company that first distributed the original The Texas Chain Saw Massacre (1974), lost the rights to that film, and the rights reverted to the original owners. New Line Cinema bought the rights and re-released the film to theatres that same year. It became very successful for the studio. Also in 1983, New Line Cinema acquired distribution rights to Sam Raimi's The Evil Dead (1981).

In 1984, Dawn Altyn and Jeff Youngs joined New Line Cinema, respectively as sales manager, eastern and southern divisions of New Line Distribution, and national print controller of the studio, to distribute new projects.

=== Mid-1980s: Beginning success with A Nightmare on Elm Street ===
A Nightmare on Elm Street was produced and released by New Line Cinema in 1984. The resulting franchise was New Line Cinema's first commercially successful series, leading the company to be nicknamed "The House that Freddy Built". The film was made on a budget of $1.8 million and grossed almost $1.3 in its opening weekend an over $25 million at the U.S. box office. A year later, A Nightmare on Elm Street 2: Freddy's Revenge (1985) was released, and grossed almost $3 million in its opening weekend and almost $30 million at the U.S. box office.

In 1986, the company went public with a market capitalization of $45 million. That same year, the company opened its Los Angeles office. Also in 1986, the film Critters was released, which led to another long-running horror film franchise for the studio.

The third film in the series, A Nightmare on Elm Street 3: Dream Warriors, was released in 1987. It was the studio's first national release (1,000-plus screens) and opened at number one, grossing $8.9 million for the weekend, a record for an independent film at the time, and went on to gross almost $45 million at the U.S. box office. An additional six films were made. The first six grossed $240 million worldwide and the next three $253 million, for a total of $493 million.

With the success of the Elm Street franchise, New Line Cinema made moves to expand their business. This included a revamping of their distribution network, the sale of their films into broadcast syndication and pay-television (via Embassy Communications and Universal Pay Television, respectively), and the creation of an international distribution arm, New Line Intl.

Logo used from 1987 to 2001; all subsequent logos have been variants derived from this logo

In 1988, New Line released a heavy metal-focused sequel to the acclaimed 1981 punk rock documentary The Decline of Western Civilization, titled The Decline of Western Civilization Part II: The Metal Years. In 1989, the company entered into a distribution partnership with CineTel Films, where CineTel handled overall rights, and New Line would handle marketing and distribution of its titles.

=== Teenage Mutant Ninja Turtles and expansion (1990–1994) ===
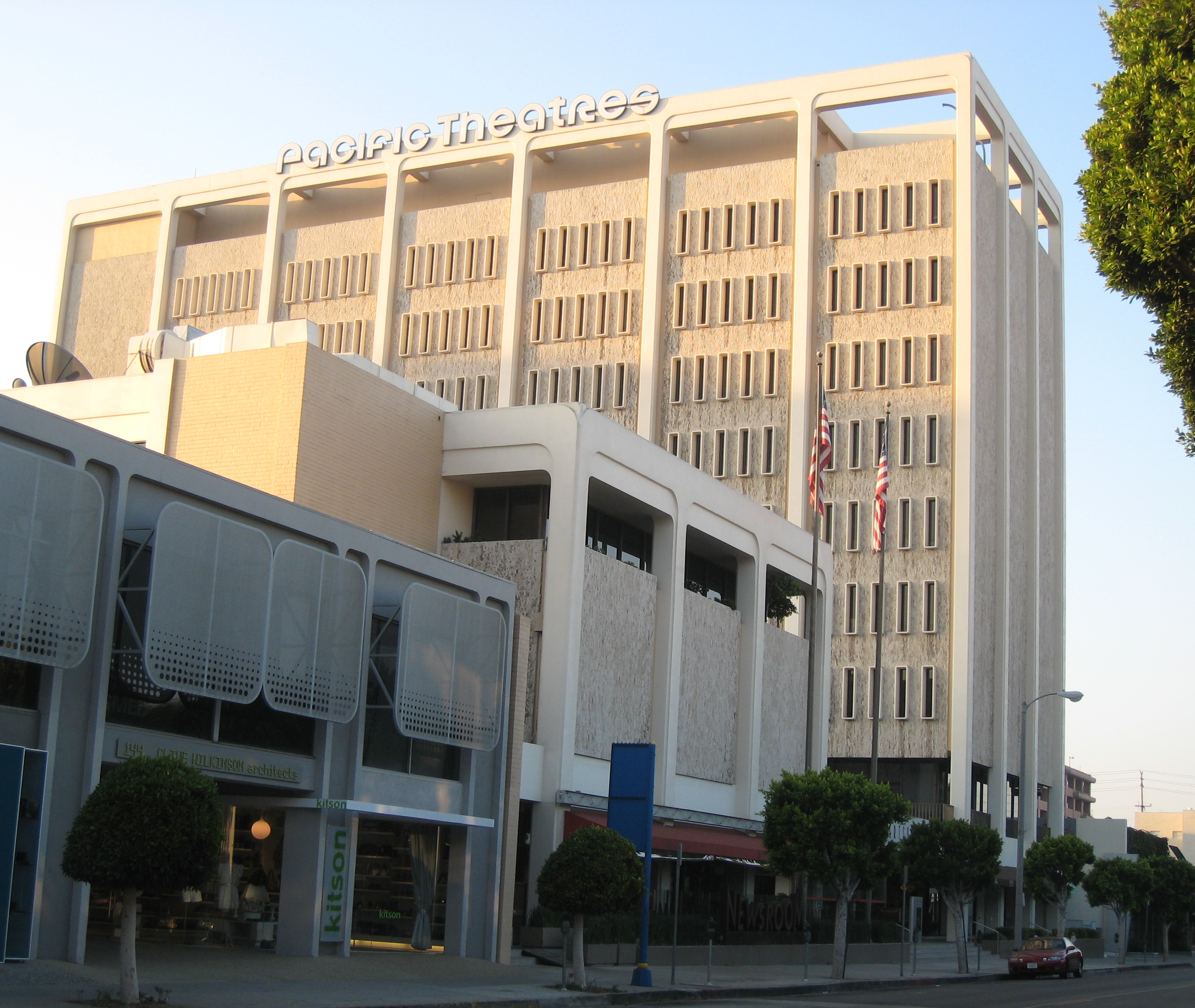
Company's headquarters in 1990s and 2000s

In 1990, Lynne became president and chief operating officer, with Shaye as chairman and chief executive officer (CEO). That same year, New Line Cinema also formed a home video division and an arthouse arm, Fine Line Features, to release boutique titles. Fine Line would go on to back Robert Altman's The Player (1992) and Short Cuts (1993), which would earn Oscar nominations.

Also in 1990, New Line released the popular comedy House Party, which led to a long running film series. That year, it also released Teenage Mutant Ninja Turtles, which became the highest-grossing independent film of all-time with a gross of $135 million in the U.S.and Canada, until it was surpassed by The Blair Witch Project (1999). It was followed by a sequel, Teenage Mutant Ninja Turtles II: The Secret of the Ooze (1991), which was the second highest-grossing with a gross of $78 million in the U.S. and Canada. Teenage Mutant Ninja Turtles III followed in 1993 and made $42 worldwide.

In July 1990, Carolco Pictures entered a joint venture with New Line Cinema to start Seven Arts, a distribution company that primarily released much of Carolco's low-budget output as opposed to their high-budget films, which were released by TriStar Pictures. In November, New Line Cinema purchased a stake in the TV production company RHI Entertainment (now Halcyon Studios, which would later be sold to Hallmark Cards in 1994) to expand its presence into TV, form New Line Television Distribution, and gain access to RHI's 1,000-title library.

In early 1991, Fine Line Features was set up as a wholly owned subsidiary headed by Ira Deutchman and released films including Jane Campion's An Angel at My Table (1990) and Gus van Sant's My Own Private Idaho (1991). That May, New Line Cinema purchased the home video and foreign rights to 600 films held by Sultan Entertainment Holdings (a.k.a. Nelson Entertainment). The deal also included an 11-film distribution deal with Castle Rock Entertainment. On November 27, New Line Cinema purchased Sultan outright. Rob Reiner’s Misery (1990) was New Line Home Video’s first VHS release under the Castle Rock deal.

In 1992, New Line released the Drew Barrymore erotic thriller Poison Ivy, which helped launch another film series, as it spawned two direct-to-video sequels in 1996 and 1997, as well as a made for television sequel in 2008. In 1992, New Line also acquired the rights to the Friday the 13th horror franchise, which previously had seven films released by Paramount Pictures in the 1980s. The franchise had been generating declining box office returns, and New Line's ultimate goal in acquiring the rights was to have a film focusing on both Jason Voorhees (the antagonist of the franchise) and Freddy Krueger (the antagonist of the A Nightmare on Elm Street franchise). This planned film saw several delays and wasn't released until 2003, with two Friday the 13th films without Krueger being released by New Line in 1993 and 2001. After acquiring the rights to Friday the 13th, New Line was involved in a bidding war for the rights to Halloween, another horror franchise. They lost out to Dimension Films, a horror/genre film-focused subsidiary of Miramax. From 1995 until 2015, Dimension would release several Halloween films.

In 1992, Michael De Luca became executive vice-president and CEO of the production unit. In 1993, the company partnered with Turner Pictures to handle theatrical distribution of Gettysburg (1993), which was intended to be released as a TNT miniseries. In July 1993, New Line Cinema signed a four-year deal with Encore (later Starz).

=== Turner purchase and Time Warner era (1994–2008) ===
On January 28, 1994, New Line Cinema was acquired by the Turner Broadcasting System for $500 million. Under Turner, New Line Cinema experienced box office success with the 1994 Jim Carrey comedies Dumb and Dumber and The Mask, which made $240 million and $320 million worldwide, respectively. Also in 1994, the company began distribution of theatrical releases by Turner Pictures, and planned to distribute releases by Castle Rock Entertainment after Sony Pictures' distribution deal expired. Shortly after their releases, both films spawned animated programs that were handled by New Line's television division and other partners. That same year, Fine Line released Hoop Dreams, which would become one of the top-grossing documentaries at that time, making almost $12 million globally.

Other successful releases under Turner ownership included David Fincher's psychological thriller Seven (1995) and the Black stoner comedy Friday (1995). The latter film received two sequels in 2000 and 2002, as well as a 2007 animated series produced in conjunction with New Line Television and MTV.

In October 1996, Turner Broadcasting System merged with Time Warner Entertainment. New Line then transferred distribution of Turner Pictures and the proposed post-Sony Castle Rock Entertainment's films to Warner Bros. Pictures, while months prior, New Line transferred distribution of Turner Feature Animation's products to Warner Bros. Pictures. New Line Cinema was kept as a separate entity for over a decade, while fellow Turner-owned studios Hanna-Barbera Productions and Castle Rock became units of Warner Bros. Although the merger closed in October 1996, New Line Cinema's opening logo continued to have the byline "A Turner Company" until mid-1997, with the last film to have this byline being Trial and Error (1997). A few months before the merger closed, it was announced that Time Warner would sell both New Line and Castle Rock if it received high enough offers. Both studios were purchased by Turner Broadcasting System in 1993 and 1994, to strengthen the company's production capabilities, but at Time Warner they were seen as redundant assets with little strategic value. The sale of either studio never eventuated.

During its time as an entity separate from Warner Bros., New Line Cinema continued to operate several divisions, including theatrical distribution, marketing, and home video. Direct-to-video films released by New Line Home Entertainment in the latter 1990s included the action films Excessive Force II: Force on Force (1995) and Raven (1996), the romantic comedy Overnight Delivery (1998), the Poison Ivy sequels Poison Ivy II: Lily (1996) and Poison Ivy: The New Seduction (1997), and the 1997 horror film Campfire Tales (which was originally in negotiations to be released theatrically by either Warner Bros. Pictures or Paramount Pictures).

The company's fortunes took a downturn in 1996 after financial losses on The Island of Dr. Moreau and The Long Kiss Goodnight. Although, in 1997, Shine (1996) received the studio's first nomination for the Academy Award for Best Picture and its second film to win an Academy Award with Geoffrey Rush's win for Best Actor. The following year, New Line Cinema's pornography industry drama Boogie Nights (1997), Canadian drama The Sweet Hereafter (1997), and political satire Wag the Dog (1997) were also nominated for multiple Academy Awards. The next year, American History X (1998) and Pleasantville (1998) also received Academy Award nominations.

In 1997, the studio released a poorly received live-action film adaptation of the Spawn comic. That same year, a much better received adult animation series based on the comic was also released, with this series being produced by the studio's new Time Warner sister company HBO. One of New Line Cinema's more financially successful projects toward the end of the 1990s was Austin Powers: International Man of Mystery (1997), which spawned two more successful sequels in 1999 and 2002. The 1998 Jackie Chan/Chris Tucker buddy film Rush Hour was another big hit for New Line Cinema, spawning two sequels in 2001 and 2007. Also in 1998, The Wedding Singer and Lost in Space grossed $123 million and $136 million at the global box office, respectively.

In 1995 and 1997, New Line Cinema released two films based on the Mortal Kombat video game series. These films were co-handled by Larry Kasanoff's recently created Threshold Entertainment, and performed moderately well at the box office despite lackluster reviews. In 1998, Threshold and New Line Television released a live-action television series based on Mortal Kombat, titled Mortal Kombat: Conquest. Time Warner went on to gain full ownership of the Mortal Kombat intellectual property in 2009, after Warner Bros. Interactive acquired bankrupt developer Midway Games in 2009.

In 1996, New Line Cinema acquired the film rights to the Marvel character Blade, releasing a successful trilogy of films between 1998 and 2004. Around this time, Marvel also sold the film rights for the rest of their characters to other studios, including 20th Century Fox, Columbia Pictures, Lionsgate, and Universal Pictures, with these studios having a contractual clause that would let the rights to the characters revert to Marvel if they failed produce a new film every few years. After New Line Cinema failed to produce a film after the third Blade film in 2004, the rights reverted to Marvel, which itself was purchased by The Walt Disney Company in 2009.

Logo used since 2001, a slight modification of the 1987 logo. While used onscreen only once since 2010, this logo frequently appears on promotional material; the current variant used since 2024 has a similar onscreen ident, albeit with minor variations including the font

==== 2000s: The Lord of the Rings era ====
New Line Cinema produced The Lord of the Rings fantasy film trilogy, which was originally attached to Miramax. These films became New Line's most successful to date, grossing over $2.9 billion worldwide. The films were nominated for 30 Academy Awards, including nominations for Best Picture for each film, and won 17, with the final film, The Lord of the Rings: The Return of the King (2003) winning a joint record of 11, including Best Picture, as well as being the second highest-grossing film of all time at the time of its release.

Despite the huge success of The Lord of the Rings films, Town and Country (2001) generated a loss of $100 million, and De Luca left as production head to be replaced by Toby Emmerich. In 2001, Shaye and Lynne became co-chairmen and co-CEOs. In the 2000s, New Line continued to be prominent in the horror genre, releasing the long awaited Freddy vs. Jason in 2003, a successful 2003 The Texas Chainsaw Massacre remake, and Final Destination (2000), which launched a long running film series. Also in 2003, Christmas comedy Elf became a critical and commercial success, grossing almost $180 million domestically and $233 million worldwide on a $33 million budget.

In July 2003, Fine Line Features partnered with HBO Films for the latter's theatrical distribution. The first two releases were biographical film and future Academy Award nominee American Splendor and Gus Van Sant's Elephant, which won a Palme d’Or at the 2003 Cannes Film Festival.

The studio was also a partner in founding a new distribution company named Picturehouse in 2005. Specializing in independent films, Picturehouse was formed by Bob Berney, who left distributor Newmarket Films, New Line Cinema, which folded its Fine Line division into Picturehouse, and HBO Films, a division of HBO and a subsidiary of Time Warner, which was interested in getting into the theatrical film business.

In 2000, the studio started its own record label, New Line Records, which released soundtrack albums for New Line projects, as well as non-film related albums by artists like Allison Moorer, The Blank Theory, and The Sounds. When Time Warner sold its music division, Warner Music Group, in 2004, New Line Records and its catalog were not included, since it was part of New Line Cinema rather than Warner. The label was renamed WaterTower Music in 2010, and began focusing on releasing soundtrack albums for projects from all divisions of Warner.

=== Warner Bros. era (2008–present) ===
Logo used from 2011 to 2024; the logotype has been used since 2011

On February 28, 2008, Time Warner's CEO at the time, Jeff Bewkes, announced that New Line Cinema would be shut down as a separately operated studio. Shaye and Lynne said they would step down in a letter to their employees. They promised, however, along with Time Warner and Jeffery Bewkes, that the company would continue to operate its financing, producing, marketing, and distributing operations of its own films, but would do so as a part of Warner Bros. and be a smaller studio, releasing a smaller number of films than in past years. The box office disappointment of The Golden Compass (2007) was largely blamed for the decision, in which New Line Cinema spent $180 million on its development, yet it only grossed $70 million in the U.S. market. In March, Emmerich became president and chief operating officer, whilst founders Shaye and Lynne had left the company.

On May 8, 2008, it was announced that Picturehouse would shut down in the fall. Berney later bought the Picturehouse trademarks from Warner Bros. and relaunched the company in 2013.

Throughout the 2010s, New Line Cinema, acting as Warner's New Line division, was beginning a horror revival, releasing The Conjuring in 2013. The film would become the first in a franchise known as The Conjuring universe, which includes spinoffs Annabell (2014), Annabelle: Creation (2017), and Annabelle Comes Home (2019) as well as spiritual prequels The Nun (2018) and The Nun II (2023). In 2017, New Line released an adaptation of the 1986 Stephen King novel It, which became a critical and commercial success, grossing $720 million at the global box office and becoming the third-highest-grossing R-rated film at the time of its release. It was followed by It Chapter Two in 2019 and grossed $473 million at the global box office.

In June 2014, New Line Cinema moved from its long-time headquarters on Robertson Boulevard in Los Angeles to Warner Bros.' lot Building 76, formerly used by Legendary Entertainment, a former Warner Bros. film co-financier. The last film released by New Line Cinema as a free-standing company was the Will Ferrell film Semi-Pro (2008).

Since 2016, New Line Cinema had been producing its own television series. New Line Television had signed a first-look deal with Warner Bros. Television in 2000, before ultimately being folded into Warner Bros. in 2008.

As for the company's future, Alan Horn, Warner Bros. president at the time of the consolidation, stated, "There's no budget number required. They'll be doing about six per year, though the number may go from four to seven; it's not going to be 10." As for content, he said, "New Line will not just be doing genre [...] There's no mandate to make a particular kind of movie."

In 2021, New Line Cinema announced Evil Dead Rise, which would go on to gross $147 million worldwide and spawn two other films. The first was a sequel to Rise, Evil Dead Burn (2026), and was released by Warner Bros. Pictures and New Line. The second is the upcoming Evil Dead Wrath, which will be a prequel to the original 1981The Evil Dead.

In 2023, New Line won the bid for Zach Cregger's horror film Weapons (2025). The film would make $270 million at the global box office and win Amy Madigan the Best Supporting Actress Oscar for her role as the villain, Aunt Gladys. In April 2026, it was reported that a Weapons prequel about Aunt Gladys was in the works.

== Film library ==
=== Film series ===
Title	Release date	No. of films	Notes	Ref.
Evil Dead	1981–present	3	Co-production with Warner Bros. The Evil Dead (1981), Evil Dead Rise (2023), Evil Dead Burn (2026)	
A Nightmare on Elm Street	1984–2010	9	Co-production with Warner Bros.	
Critters	1986–2019	5		
House Party	1990–present	6		
Teenage Mutant Ninja Turtles	1990–1993	3	Co-production with Golden Harvest and 20th Century Fox (1991–93)	
The Texas Chainsaw Massacre	1990–2006	3	Co-production with Platinum Dunes and Focus Features (2003 and 2006)	
Poison Ivy	1992–2008	4		
Friday the 13th	1993–2009	4		
Excessive Force	1993–1995	2		
Dumb and Dumber	1994–2014	3	Co-production with Universal Pictures (2014)	
The Mask	1994–2005	2	Co-production with Dark Horse Entertainment	
Friday	1995–2002	3		
Mortal Kombat	1995–present	4	Co-production with Warner Bros. for the reboot series	
Austin Powers	1997–2002	3		
Blade	1998–2004	3	Co-production with Marvel Entertainment	
Rush Hour	1998–2007	3		
Final Destination	2000–present	6		
The Cell	2000–2009	2		
The Lord of the Rings	2001–present	3		
Harold & Kumar	2004–2011	3		
Sex and the City	2008–2010	2	Co-production with Warner Bros. Pictures and HBO Films	
Horrible Bosses	2011–2014	2	Co-production with Warner Bros. Pictures	
The Hobbit	2012–2014	3	Co-production with Warner Bros. Pictures and Metro-Goldwyn-Mayer	
The Conjuring	2013–present	10	Co-production with Warner Bros. Pictures (Five Conjuring films, three Annabell films, two Nun films)	
Rocky	2015–2018	2	Co-production with Warner Bros. Pictures and Metro-Goldwyn-Mayer (specifically Creed and Creed II)	
It	2017–2019	2		
Shazam!	2019–2023	3	Co-production with DC films Part of the DC Extended Universe	

=== Highest-grossing films ===
Rank	Title	Year	Worldwide gross	Notes
1	The Lord of the Rings: The Return of the King ‡	2003	$1,118,887,224 (original), $1,138,267,561	
2	The Hobbit: An Unexpected Journey	2012	$1,017,453,991	Distributed by Warner Bros. Pictures; co-production with Metro-Goldwyn-Mayer Pictures
3	The Hobbit: The Desolation of Smaug	2013	$959,079,095	Distributed by Warner Bros. Pictures; co-production with Metro-Goldwyn-Mayer Pictures
4	The Hobbit: The Battle of the Five Armies	2014	$962,749,443	Distributed by Warner Bros. Pictures; co-production with Metro-Goldwyn-Mayer Pictures
5	The Lord of the Rings: The Two Towers ‡	2002	$923,015,234 (original), $945,184,312	
6	The Lord of the Rings: The Fellowship of the Ring ‡	2001	$868,385,360 (original), $897,538,741	
7	It	2017	$719,766,009	Distributed by Warner Bros. Pictures; co-production with Vertigo Entertainment, Lin Pictures and KatzSmith Productions
8	The Conjuring: Last Rites	2025	$499,256,445	
9	San Andreas	2015	$474,609,154	Distributed by Warner Bros. Pictures; co-production with Village Roadshow Pictures
10	It Chapter Two	2019	$473,123,154	Distributed by Warner Bros. Pictures; co-production with Double Dream, Vertigo Entertainment, and Rideback
11	Rampage	2018	$428,128,399	
12	Sex and the City	2008	$418,769,989	Distributed by Warner Bros. Pictures; co-production with HBO Films
13	Black Adam	2023	$393,452,111	Distributed by Warner Bros. Pictures; co-production with DC Films
14	The Golden Compass	2007	$372,234,864	
15	Shazam!	2019	$367,799,011	Distributed by Warner Bros. Pictures; co-production with DC Films
16	The Nun	2018	$366,082,797	Distributed by Warner Bros. Pictures; co-production with Atomic Monster and the Safran Company
17	Journey 2: The Mysterious Island	2011	$335,288,576	
18	The Mask	1994	$351,583,407	
19	Rush Hour 2	2001	$347,325,802	
20	Se7en	1995	$329,813,591	
21	The Conjuring 2	2016	$322,819,915	
22	The Conjuring	2013	$321,293,998	Distributed by Warner Bros. Pictures
23	Final Destination Bloodlines	2025	$317,854,739	Distributed by Warner Bros. Pictures
24	Austin Powers: The Spy Who Shagged Me	1999	$313,701,294	
25	Annabelle: Creation	2017	$306,592,201	Distributed by Warner Bros. Pictures

‡ Includes theatrical reissue(s)

== See also ==
- Fine Line Features
- New Line Home Entertainment
- New Line Television
- Picturehouse (with HBO)
