= Jaime Pressly =

American actress and model (born 1977)

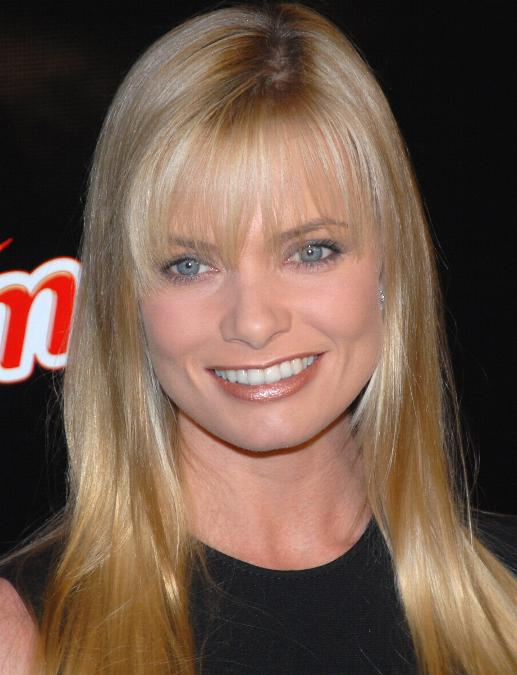
- Pressly in 2008
- Born: Jaime Elizabeth Pressly; July 30, 1977 (age 49); Kinston, North Carolina, U.S.
- Occupations: Actress; model
- Years active: 1991–present
- Spouse: Simran Singh (m. 2009; div. 2011)
- Partner(s): Eric Calvo (2005–2008); Hamzi Hijazi (2011–present)
- Children: 3

Signature
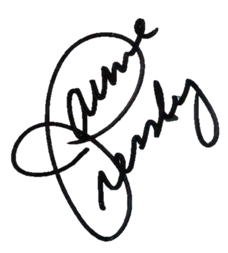

Jaime Elizabeth Pressly (born July 30, 1977) is an American actress and model. Known for her role as Joy Turner on the NBC sitcom My Name Is Earl (2005–2009), she won a Primetime Emmy Award for Outstanding Supporting Actress in a Comedy Series and received nominations for two Screen Actors Guild Awards, a Golden Globe Award, a Satellite Award, and four Gold Derby Awards (winning once). She has appeared in such films as Can't Hardly Wait (1998), Inferno (1999), Not Another Teen Movie (2001), The Karate Dog (2004), and I Love You, Man (2009). For her portrayal of Jill Kendall on the CBS sitcom Mom (2014–2021), she was nominated for the Critics' Choice Television Award for Best Supporting Actress in a Comedy Series.

== Early life and modeling ==
Jaime Elizabeth Pressly was born on July 30, 1977, in Kinston, North Carolina, the daughter of Brenda Sue (née Smith), a dance instructor, and James Liston Pressly (d.2026), a car salesman. She has a brother, James Jr. In 1992, she moved with her family to Costa Mesa, California, where she spent the first semester of her high school sophomore year. She spent her childhood and early teenage years training as a gymnast, which led her to modeling jobs. At age 14, she appeared on her first cover, Teen Magazine, and became the spokesmodel for the International Cover Model Search. At 15, she dropped out of school and went to Japan on a modeling contract. She succeeded in having herself legally emancipated from her parents at 15 so she could travel to Japan, as neither of her parents could make the trip.

== Acting career ==
=== 1995–2004: Career beginnings ===
After making an uncredited appearance in Baywatch in 1995, followed by filming a cameo in the film Mercenary in 1996, Pressly starred as Violet, a vengeful seductress, in the 1997 direct-to-DVD film Poison Ivy: The New Seduction, the third installment of the Poison Ivy series. After a small role in the teen cult classic Can't Hardly Wait, television appearances followed, with guest roles in the short-lived Push and Mortal Kombat: Conquest. She went on to play one of the leads in Jack & Jill, which aired for two seasons, from September 26, 1999, to April 15, 2001, on The WB. Pressly headlined the independent film Poor White Trash (2000), playing scheming gold-digger Sandy Lake, and appeared in three 2001 theatrical releases aimed at a teenage audience, which despite varying degrees of success, helped her receive more exposure. The parody film Not Another Teen Movie, most notably, featured her as Priscilla, a high school cheerleader opposite Chris Evans, while she took on the roles of a young wife in the sex comedy Tomcats and that of a Southern love interest in the comedy Joe Dirt, opposite David Spade.

In 2002, Pressly starred as a college student trapped in a haunted island in the independent horror film Demon Island. Felix Vasquez of Cinema Crazed regarded it as a guilty pleasure and stated: "[She] does what she can with her character and comes off as a rather charming character". She next portrayed a crazed, motorcycle-riding criminal in the action thriller Torque (2004), alongside Ice Cube. In a profile, The New Yorker, describing this phase of her career, asserted: "She is typically cast on the strength of her looks and her Southern sassiness, and she has had girlfriend roles in several forgettable teensploitation flicks".

=== 2005–2009: Breakthrough ===
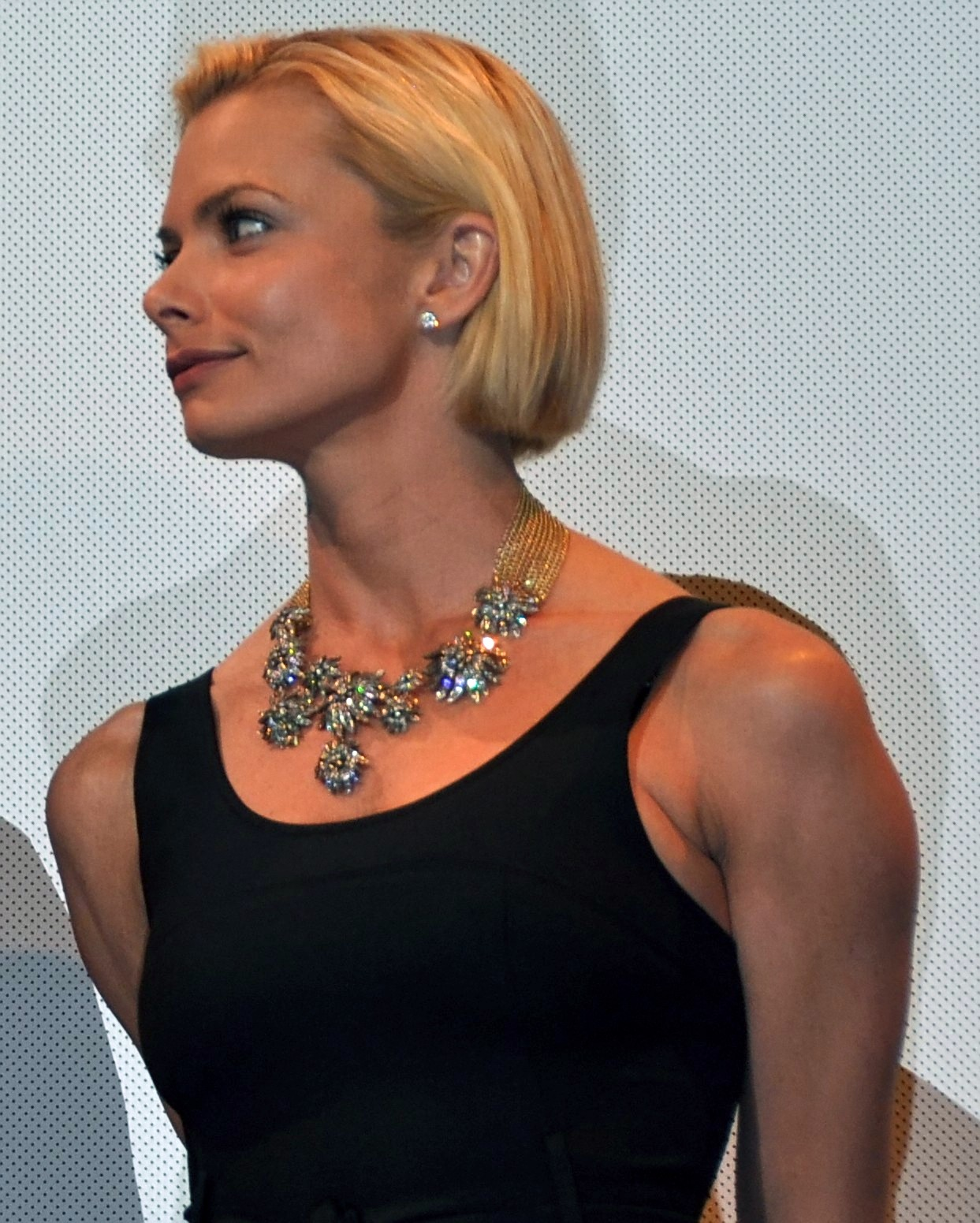
Pressly at the premiere of I Love You, Man in 2009

Between 2005 and 2009, Pressly played Joy Turner, the pessimistic, cold-hearted, stubborn and vain ex-wife of a small-time thief, in the NBC sitcom My Name Is Earl, which was a success with critics and audiences. She garnered nominations for a Golden Globe and a Screen Actors Guild Award, and in 2007, she won a Primetime Emmy Award for Outstanding Supporting Actress in a Comedy Series for her work on the show. Pressly once called her role her "greatest release" and thanked creator Greg Garcia for restoring her faith in the business. She remarked: "[The series] came at a time when I was questioning whether this was the path I wanted to continue following. I was tired of living out of my suitcase, coming and going all the time. I wanted a little normalcy in my life."

During the early run of My Name Is Earl, Pressly produced and took on the role of a homicidal magazine editor in the independent film Death to the Supermodels (2005), a role she compared to that of Reese Witherspoon in Election. In his review for the film, Scott Weinberg of DVDTalk.com, wrote: "Jaime Pressly is a funny, funny woman. To those of you My Name Is Earl fans who are just now discovering the juicy talents of the perpetually sneering, eye-rolling, attitude machine known as Jaime Pressly, I'd recommend you check out her work in flicks like Ringmaster, Tomcats, Joe Dirt, Torque, and Not Another Teen Movie. Basically, if we were giving out an award for "the consistently best thing in a series of generally atrocious comedies," Jaime would be walking home with that prize, no sweat. Regardless of how bad the movie is [...] Jaime always seems like a kooky and kinetic cartoon character who somehow figured out how to become flesh & blood. Yes, she's sexy and all that, but Jaime Pressly is also funny, and that just amplifies all her other assets".

In DOA: Dead or Alive (2006), a British-German martial arts action film based on a Japanese video game franchise of the same name, Pressly starred as one of four female fighters working together to uncover the secret that the organizer of an invitational martial arts contest is trying to hide. While the film was relatively successful on some markets, it only found a limited audience in North America. In 2006, she also hosted the first annual VH1 Rock Honors, and an episode of Saturday Night Live, and guest-starred on MADtv, playing Hillary Clinton in a parody of My Name Is Earl, "My Name Is Dubya", in which George W. Bush (Frank Caliendo) makes a list of all the bad things he has done in the past and rectifies them one by one. She voiced a bird in the animated comedy film Horton Hears a Who! (2008).

In I Love You, Man (2009), Pressly starred opposite Paul Rudd and Jason Segel, as the best friend of a bride-to-be and one half of a volatile married couple. The film received critical acclaim and was a box office success, grossing US$92 million worldwide. Rolling Stone found her "terrific" in her role, asserting: "Her battles with [her on-screen husband] have genuine comic bite".

=== 2010–present: continued television roles ===
The ABC Family television film Beauty & the Briefcase (2010), co-starring Hilary Duff, featured Pressly as a primary editor at Cosmopolitan magazine. The premiere received 2.4 million viewers attracting a strong female audience that drove the network to an all-time high in viewers. Smoke Screen, another 2010 television film, saw her star as a reporter finding herself in the middle of a murder investigation when she wakes up next to a dead body. In 2010, Pressly also guest-starred in two episodes of the CBS comedy Rules of Engagement, as a possible surrogate mother for Jeff and Audrey (Patrick Warburton and Megyn Price).

In 6 Month Rule (2011), an independent film released for limited theaters and digital markets, Pressly played what was described as a "harridan of an ex-fiancée" by The New York Times. She appeared in the interactive educational children's musical comedy The Oogieloves in the Big Balloon Adventure (2012), as a flamenco dancer riding a giant flying sombrero. Budgeted at US$20 million, the film only made US$445,000 in more than 2,000 screens during its opening weekend. Pressly next had regular roles in two short-lived series. The Fox sitcom I Hate My Teenage Daughter (2011–2012) saw her portray a mother fearing her daughter is turning into the kind of girl who tormented her in high school, while the TV Land comedy Jennifer Falls (2014) featured her as a single mother, who after being fired from a high-paying job, becomes a waitress in her brother's bar.

Pressly obtained leading roles in three 2014 film releases. In A Haunted House 2, Pressly starred as a mother of two and one half of an interracial couple, alongside Marlon Wayans. She had known Wayans for 15 years prior filming and the project marked the first time they worked together. Describing the process, she said: "It was a match made in heaven. It really was. We're both high energy, and we both like to do something new every take, and when you do comedy like this, where you get to improv the majority of the time, it's about trying to one-up each other, and that makes for a really great comedy". The film was panned by critics, but was a decent box office success. She starred opposite singer Robin Thicke in the romantic comedy Making the Rules, which was filmed in 2012. Finders Keepers, a television horror film, saw Pressly play a divorced mother whose life is thrown into turmoil when her young daughter becomes obsessed with an evil doll left behind by the previous owners.

From 2014 to 2021, Pressly portrayed Jill Kendall, a wealthy socialite and alcoholic, in the CBS sitcom Mom. Mom was met with widespread critical acclaim and ran for eight seasons. Created and executive produced by Chuck Lorre, the show followed a group of women recovering from addiction. On August 4, 2022, Fox announced that Pressly had joined the cast of the sitcom Welcome to Flatch as a series regular for the second season.

== Other ventures ==
=== Fashion ===
In 2003, Pressly launched a lingerie line, J'aime by Jaime Pressly, and expanded it to clothing and sleepwear. In 2007, People magazine called her spring/summer clothing line a "sophisticated and star-studded fashion show" and "one of the biggest shows of L.A. Fashion Week." In spring 2008, she launched a second clothing line, J'aime Collection. "I've always had an interest in design, and I have always loved creating things," Pressly said in an interview with Redbook in 2008. She ended her clothing lines in September 2008.

=== OnlyFans ===
In May 2026, Pressly started an OnlyFans account. Pressly cited "evolving with the times" and creative freedom as reasons behind the venture.

== In the media ==
In a 2008 interview with Redbook magazine, Pressly credited her success for "lifelong willingness to defy convention."

Pressly's appearance has often been the subject of media attention. She has appeared on several lists for world's most beautiful or sexiest women. Her changing looks and style have received noteworthy praise from periodicals such as InStyle.

In 2000, she became a spokesmodel for Liz Claiborne Cosmetics and advertised the company's fragrance "Lucky You". In 2008, she appeared in an infomercial for Susan Lucci's "Youthful Essence" personal microdermabrasion kit, and an advertisement for Axe in 2010. She has graced the covers of numerous magazines, including InStyle Weddings, Ocean Drive, Health, Esquire, Redbook, Shape, Stuff, Maxim and Playboy.

== Personal life ==
Pressly has revealed in interviews that she briefly struggled with bulimia as a teenager.

In 2005, she began dating Eric Calvo. They were friends for more than nine years prior. On May 11, 2007, in Cedars-Sinai Medical Center, Pressly gave birth to their son. In November 2008, the couple announced their separation.

Eight months later, in July 2009, Pressly announced her engagement to entertainment lawyer Simran Singh. They married on September 26, 2009, at the Dick Clark estate, on a bluff overlooking the Pacific Ocean. On January 21, 2011, Pressly filed for divorce from Singh, citing irreconcilable differences. The divorce was finalized in November 2011.

In October 2017, Pressly gave birth to twin sons with her longtime boyfriend Hamzi Hijazi.

== Filmography ==
=== Film ===
Year	Title	Role	Notes
1996	Mercenary	Pre-teen American Girl	
1997	Poison Ivy: The New Seduction	Violet	
1997	The Journey: Absolution	Allison	
1997	Against the Law	Sally	
1998	Can't Hardly Wait	Beth	Credited as Jamie Pressly
1998	Ringmaster	Angel Zorzak	
1999	Inferno	Dottie Matthews	
2000	100 Girls	Cynthia	
2000	Poor White Trash	Sandy Lake	
2001	Not Another Teen Movie	Priscilla	
2001	Ticker	Claire Manning	
2001	Joe Dirt	Jill	
2001	Tomcats	Tricia	
2002	Demon Island	Tina	
2004	Torque	China	
2005	Death to the Supermodels	Tiffany Courtney	Also as producer
2006	Bachelor Party Vegas	Herself	
2006	DOA: Dead or Alive	Tina Armstrong	
2008	Horton Hears a Who!	Mrs. Quilligan	Voice
2009	I Love You, Man	Denise McLean	
2011	6 Month Rule	Claire	
2012	The Oogieloves in the Big Balloon Adventure	Lola Sombrero	
2014	A Haunted House 2	Megan	
2014	Making the Rules	Abby	Also as executive producer
2017	Austin Found	Crystal Clemens	
2023	The Re-Education of Molly Singer	Brenda	
2026	Last Shot	Lexi	

=== Television ===
Year	Title	Role	Notes
1995	Baywatch	Beach Girl	Episode: "Promised Land"
1998	Push	Nikki Lang	Main cast
1998	Silk Stalkings	Kara Delaney	Episode: "Teacher's Pet"
1998	Night Man	Yvette	Episode: "Double Vision"
1998–99	Mortal Kombat: Conquest	Mika	3 episodes
1999–2001	Jack & Jill	Audrey Griffin	Main cast
2000	Best Actress	Karen Kroll	TV movie
2001	Going to California	Kylie Guartz	Episode: "This Year's Model"
2002	Charmed	Mylie	Episode: "A Witch's Tail, Part 1"
2002	The Twilight Zone	Cindy	Episode: "Sensuous Cindy"
2002	The Johnny Chronicles	Charlie	TV movie
2003	Fastlane	Sara Matthews	Episode: "Strap On"
2003	Becker	Grace	Episode: "Sister Spoils the Turkey"
2004	Happy Family	Alex	Recurring
2004	The Karate Dog	Ashley Wilkenson	TV movie
2004	Evel Knievel	Linda Bork	TV movie
2005	Entourage	Herself	Episode: "My Maserati Does 185"
2005–09	My Name Is Earl	Joy Turner	Main cast (96 episodes)
2006	Mad TV	Herself	Episode: "11.13"
2006	Las Vegas	Kerry Kowalski	Episode: "Coyote Ugly"
2006	Saturday Night Live	Herself/host	Episode: "Jaime Pressly/Corrine Bailey Rae"
2009	Rex	Jaime	TV movie
2010	Beauty & the Briefcase	Kate White	TV movie
2010	Rules of Engagement	Pam Milton	2 episodes
2010	Smoke Screen	Britt Shelley	TV movie
2010	Livin' on a Prayer	Steph	TV movie
2011–13	Raising Hope	Donna	3 episodes
2011–12	I Hate My Teenage Daughter	Annie Watson	Main cast (13 episodes)
2012	Bad Girls	Melinda	TV movie
2012	The Greatest Footie Ads Ever	Deneice	TV movie
2013	Two and a Half Men	Tammy	2 episodes
2013	Phineas and Ferb	Rosie	Voice, Episode: "Mind Share"
2013	Melissa & Joey	Meredith	Episode: "A New Kind of Christmas"
2014	Hollywood Game Night	Herself	Episode: "50 Charades of Grey"
2014	RuPaul's Drag Race	Herself / Guest Judge	Episode: "Drag Queens of Comedy"
2014	Hot in Cleveland	Kelly	Episode: "Surprise!"
2014	Jennifer Falls	Jennifer Doyle	Main cast
2014	Finders Keepers	Alyson Simon	TV movie
2014–21	Mom	Jill Kendall	127 episodes; Recurring role (season 2); Main cast (season 3–8)
2017	The Guest Book	Christy	Episode: "Story Four"
2018	BoJack Horseman	Sadie	2 episodes
2022–2023	Welcome to Flatch	Barb Flatch	Main cast; 24 episodes
2023	Play-Doh Squished	Herself / Guest Judge	Episode: "Candy Store"
2023	The Conners	Tire Shop Manager	Episode: "Adding Insult to Injury"
2025	Elsbeth	Tiff Giles	Episode: "Glamazons"
2026	Leanne	Kimi	2 episodes
2026	All's Fair	Crystal	Episode: "Liberty Unleashed"

=== Video games ===
Year	Title	Role	Notes
2008	Saints Row 2	Jessica Parish	Voice

=== Music videos ===
Year	Artist	Song	Role
2001	Dave Matthews Band	The Space Between	
2002	Aerosmith	Girls of Summer	Woman
2002	Marilyn Manson	Tainted Love	Priscilla
2003	Youngbloodz	Lean Low	
2010	Jaron Lowenstein	Pray For You	
2013	Michael Bublé	It's a Beautiful Day	Girlfriend

== Awards and nominations ==
Year	Association	Category	Work	Result
2002	MTV Movie & TV Awards	Best Line in a Movie ("Oh, it's already been broughten!")	Not Another Teen Movie	Nominated
2002	Teen Choice Awards	Choice Breakout Performance – Film	Not Another Teen Movie	Nominated
2006	Gold Derby Awards	TV Breakthrough Performer of the Year	—N/a	Nominated
2006	Gold Derby Awards	TV Comedy Series Supporting Actress of the Year	My Name Is Earl	Won
2006	Online Film & Television Association	Best Supporting Actress in a Television Comedy Series	My Name Is Earl	Won
2006	Screen Actors Guild Awards	Outstanding Performance by an Ensemble in a Television Comedy Series	My Name Is Earl	Nominated
2006	Teen Choice Awards	Choice Television Actress	My Name Is Earl	Nominated
2006	Primetime Emmy Awards	Outstanding Supporting Actress in a Comedy Series	My Name Is Earl	Nominated
2007	Primetime Emmy Awards	Outstanding Supporting Actress in a Comedy Series	My Name Is Earl	Won
2007	Gold Derby Awards	TV Comedy Series Supporting Actress of the Year	My Name Is Earl	Nominated
2007	Monte-Carlo Television Festival	Outstanding Actress – Comedy Series	My Name Is Earl	Won
2007	Online Film & Television Association	Best Supporting Actress in a Television Comedy Series	My Name Is Earl	Won
2007	Satellite Awards	Best Supporting Actress – Series, Miniseries or TV Film	My Name Is Earl	Nominated
2008	Golden Globe Awards	Best Supporting Actress – Series, Miniseries or Motion Picture Made for Television	My Name Is Earl	Nominated
2008	Teen Choice Awards	Choice Television Actress – Comedy	My Name Is Earl	Nominated
2010	Denver Film Critics Society	Best Acting Ensemble	I Love You, Man	Nominated
2021	Critics' Choice Awards	Best Television Comedy Series Supporting Actress	Mom	Nominated
