= Smiley (2012 film) =

2012 film directed by Michael Gallagher

- Theatrical release poster
- Directed by: Michael Gallagher
- Screenplay by: Glasgow Phillips; Michael Gallagher
- Produced by: Michael Wormser
- Starring: Caitlin Gerard; Melanie Papalia; Shane Dawson; Andrew James Allen; Liza Weil; Roger Bart; Keith David
- Cinematography: Nicola B. Marsh
- Edited by: Zach Anderson
- Music by: Dave Porter
- Production companies: MJG Productions; Level 10 Films
- Distributed by: Fever Productions LLC
- Release date: October 12, 2012 (United States)
- Running time: 95 minutes
- Country: United States
- Language: English

Smiley is a 2012 American slasher film directed by Michael Gallagher, who also co-wrote the screenplay with Glasgow Phillips. The film stars Caitlin Gerard, Melanie Papalia, Shane Dawson, Andrew James Allen, Liza Weil, Roger Bart, and Keith David. The film was released on October 12, 2012, to largely negative reviews.

== Plot ==
The titular Smiley killer is the subject of an Internet myth. Supposedly, if a person types "I did it for the lulz" three times on a Chatroulette-style website, a killer called Smiley (who had his eyes stitched shut and his mouth carved into a smile) will murder the person the user is talking to before the user themselves.

College students Ashley and Proxy are roommates. At a party, Ashley meets Zane, Mark, Crash, Kells and Binder.

One night, Ashley and Proxy test out the Smiley myth with a random person. After typing "I did it for the lulz" three times, they witness the stranger's murder. Proxy convinces Ashley to stay silent. However, Ashley begins experiencing guilt, and believes Smiley is stalking her and intends to kill her, which her friends and a psychiatrist write off as anxious hallucinations and nightmares. Ashley eventually tries to convince the police to investigate the murders caused by Smiley. The police dismiss her.

When Proxy loses contact with Zane, she video chats Ashley in hysterics. Ashley goes to Zane's house only to find him shot dead with his own handgun. Ashley picks up the gun and orders Proxy to type "I did it for the lulz" three times, hoping to summon and kill Smiley. However, she accidentally shoots Binder, who had come over to check on her. Moments later, Smiley appears and slits Binder's throat. Ashley is then attacked by multiple Smileys before throwing herself out to her supposed death.

It is then revealed that Ashley's classmates, including Proxy, Binder, and the babysitter murdered in the opening, are all part of a fringe group of Anonymous. They created the Smiley myth as a large-scale prank, although they are satisfied with Ashley's death. Binder states that Smiley will likely live on long after them and inspire copycat killings.

Later, Proxy is video-chatting with Zane, questioning their morality. Zane dismisses her worries and types "I did it for the lulz" three times as a joke. However, a Smiley appears behind Proxy, kills her, and then waves at Zane via webcam as he watches on in horror.

In a post-credits scene, Ashley wakes up and gasps loudly, having survived her fall.

== Cast ==
- Caitlin Gerard as Ashley
- Melanie Papalia as Proxy
- Shane Dawson as Binder
- Andrew James Allen as Zane
- Liza Weil as Dr. Jenkins
- Toby Turner as Mark
- Roger Bart as Professor Clayton
- Keith David as Officer Diamond
- Patrick O'Sullivan as Cooper
- Steve Greene as Crash
- Richard Ryan as Kells
- Nikki Limo as Stacy
- Jason Horton as Flasher
- Bree Essrig as Kim
- Darrien Skylar as Mary
- Michael Traynor as Smiley

== Production and release ==
Gallagher began working on Smiley after performing in some episodes of the Totally Sketch series on YouTube. As he was producing the film himself, Smiley had a small budget and Gallagher was active in various different parts of the film such as advertising and seeking MPAA approval. Gallagher initially debated using stockings with a smiley face painted on it as Smiley's mask, but discarded the idea because it "just wasn't scary enough". He chose to go with the final mask after imagining a "guy who stitched an emoticon into his own face and thought, 'Wow, that's really creepy.'" Theatrical rights for the film were purchased by AMC Theatres who gave the film a limited screening on their independent platform on October 12, 2012.

The film played in select AMC theaters throughout the United States, with fans able to request to host screenings of Smiley in their cities via Tugg.

== Reaction from 4chan and Anonymous ==
Prior to the film's official theatrical release, Gallagher and his family allegedly began receiving threats from people alleging to be from 4chan and Anonymous. Personal information for Gallagher, his family, and anyone that had worked on Smiley was posted online with the recommendation that people use it to harass them. In an interview with Fearnet, Gallagher stated that the site had posted the information as part of "Operation Fuck Smiley" and that "Their goal was to spoil the end of the movie, post pornography and gore on any website that talks about it, rate the movie really low... it was this horrible vendetta, like they wanted to destroy it because we talked about 4chan in the movie". The validity of these claims were questioned by Cole Strycker, author of Epic Win for Anonymous, who expressed suspicion that Gallagher was trying to use the death threats as a publicity stunt to promote the film. In response, Gallagher asserted that the death threats were real and were not being used as a publicity stunt.

== Reception ==
The film received largely negative reviews and holds an 17% rating on Rotten Tomatoes based on an average rating of 3.6/10 based on 24 reviews; several reviews called the film a "rip off" of Scream and Candyman. Criticism centered on claims of the film being "dull" or "generic", with additional criticisms over the acting performances and lack of originality. Smiley also received negative reviews from The A.V. Club and The New York Times.

Bloody Disgusting panned the film, stating that the writers "took a strong, modern idea, over-thought it and turned it into a generic '90s movie that'll have you throwing popcorn at the screen". Variety called the film "uninspired", saying that "the mayhem here is neither especially gory nor suspenseful". Mark Olsen of the Los Angeles Times gave a more positive review, calling the film a "more or less satisfying low-key creeper". Olsen praised Gerard, Weil, David, and Bart's performances, but called the story-telling "repetitive".
