= A Dancer's Life =

- Directed by: William Richert
- Produced by: William Richert
- Starring: Leon Danielian; Janis Roswick Menken; Daniel Giagni; Andrei Kulyk; Valentina Pereyaslavec; Yurek Lazowski; Rudolph Nureyev; Natalia Makarova; Michael Maule; Fernando Bujones
- Edited by: David Hill; Anthony Potenza; Robert Van Dyke
- Production companies: Leroy Street Productions, Inc.
- Distributed by: Roninfilm
- Release dates: October 20, 1972 (San Francisco Film Festival); June of 1973 First Avenue Screening Room, New York City
- Running time: 70 minutes
- Country: United States
- Language: English

A Dancer's Life: The First Position is a 1972 ballet documentary directed and produced by William Richert. The personal and professional lives of aspiring dancers at New York's American Ballet Theatre School are chronicled in this documentary.

== Synopsis ==
This documentary about the teachers and students of the American Ballet Theatre School focuses primarily on three aspiring dancers: teenaged Janis Roswick, Daniel Giagni (who adores her), and the irresponsible David Prince. Throughout the film, Janis reads aloud from her diary, disclosing her intention to add beauty to the world and become a better person through dance, and describes her preparation to lose her innocence. Janis is frequently seen walking with Daniel and another dancer, Andrei Kulyk, who flirts with her.

When Daniel confides in Andrei about the shyness which keeps him from declaring his feelings for Janis, Andrei advises him to sublimate his feelings to his art. Daniel's life outside of school, as he drills and trains to be a typist with the New York National Guard, is contrasted with his rehearsals of a scene from Petrouchka, in which he evokes unrequited love as Janis watches.

Daniel comes close to initiating a romantic moment with Janis in her apartment when he tries to take her hand, but when she is not responsive, he soon leaves. David is first seen in his apartment, telling fellow student Marlese Rockey of his ambivalence about becoming a dancer and complaining that Leon Danielian, the school's director, characterizes him as conniving. Following this, David is seen in Danielian's office, where the director remarks on the boy's improved attitude and cautions him that it must continue or he will be dismissed from school.

David is later seen during a visit with his mother, who tries to convince him to return home to Florida. In a segment titled “Acceptance,” after having sex with Marlese, David announces that he might soon leave New York, and later, in a segment called “Betrayal,” Marlese characterizes her affair with him as “time wasted on something that didn’t exist.” In the following segment, David is seen back on a Florida beach, discussing Marlese, his feelings about his lost dance career and his current employment as a supermarket bagger.

In segments throughout the film, costumed dancers perform excerpts from the ballet Petrouchka. Teachers Valentina Pereyaslavec and Michael Maule are seen instructing classes, as is Danielian. Using a wheelchair throughout most of the film, Danielian discusses his ongoing treatments for arthritis, and sepia-toned footage of a young Danielian dancing in Paris is shown. Later, after an operation restores his mobility, Danielian walks into class where he is applauded by his students. Rudolph Nureyev is seen briefly in practice at the studio and Julie Newmar discusses the life of a dancer and talks to Maule about his short film career.

The film ends with a long session in which Janis and Daniel perform a romantic, tender dance together, followed by still photographs of students as Pereyaslavec's voice is heard instructing a class.

== Cast ==
- Leon Danielian
- Janis Roswick Menken
- Daniel Giagni
- Andrei Kulyk
- Valentina Pereyaslavec
- Yurek Lazowski
- Marlese Rockey
- Michael Maule
- Seymour Roswick
- Alex Edwards
- Rudolph Nureyev
- Natalia Makarova
- Julie Newmar
- Fernando Bujones
- Dana Nugent

=== Petrouchka dancers ===
- Michael Smuin
- Diana Weber
- Keith Lee
- Yurek Lazowski
- Valentina Vishevsky

== Critical reception ==
The film received some "glowing reviews, then disappeared," as described by Diane Hubbard Burns of the Orlando Sentinel in 1990. The New York Times' film critic Roger Greenspun gave the film a positive review upon its release in New York in June 1973. In 1992, John Hartl of The Seattle Times called it "one of the finest ballet movies ever made."

== Home media ==
The documentary was restored by the film's executive producer Jerry Seltzer and producer/director William Richert using the only two existing prints, rescuing it from obscurity. The film was released on home video "somewhere in the early 1990s."
