= Melanie Papalia =

Canadian actress (born 1984)

- Born: Melanie Rose Papalia; July 11, 1984 (age 41); Vancouver, British Columbia, Canada
- Occupation: Actress
- Years active: 2003–present
- Children: 2

Melanie Rose Papalia (born July 11, 1984) is a Canadian actress. She has appeared in films such as Postal (2007), American Pie Presents: The Book of Love (2009), Frankie & Alice (2010), Smiley (2012), The Den (2013), and Hell or High Water (2016). Papalia has also appeared in various television series including Intelligence (2005), Painkiller Jane (2007), Endgame (2011), Suits (2014), and You Me Her (2016–2020).

== Filmography ==
Film work by Melanie Papalia
Year	Title	Role	Notes
2005	Dark Room	Debbie	Short film
2007	Postal	Nasira	
2008	Sweet Amerika	Maria	
2009	Dancing Trees	Penny	
2009	American Pie Presents: The Book of Love	Dana	Direct-to-video
2009	Christmas Crash	Amanda Johnson	Video
2010	Frankie & Alice	Tina	
2010	Confined	Eva Peyton	
2010	Super Hybrid	Maria	
2011	Wannabe Macks	Mia	
2012	Indie Jonesing	Madeline	
2012	Smiley	Proxy	
2012	Darkness	Joshua	Short
2013	The Den	Elizabeth Benton	
2014	Extraterrestrial	Melanie	
2016	Hell or High Water	Hooker	

Television work by Melanie Papalia
Year	Title	Role	Notes
2003	Cold Squad	Young Hooker	Episodes: "Killing Time", "True Believers: Part 2"
2004	Smallville	Brianna Withridge	Episode: "Spell"
2005	Killer Instinct	Maureen	Episode: "Die Like an Egyptian"
2005–2006	Intelligence	Casey Whelan	Recurring role
2006	Supernatural	Meredith McDonell	Episode: "Shadow"
2006	Godiva's	Ashlee	Episode: "The Tempting Spice"
2006	Saved	Marisa	Episode: "A Day in the Life"
2006	Blade: The Series	Jennifer	Episode: "Hunters"
2007	Painkiller Jane	Amanda Worth	Recurring role (11 episodes)
2008	Aliens in America	Alicia	Episodes: "Hunting", "Wake at the Lake"
2009	Angel and the Bad Man	Sandy Johnson	TV film
2009	The Assistants	Sandra	Recurring role (6 episodes)
2010	Always a Bridesmaid	Carla	Episode: "Two to Tango"
2010	Freshman Father	Michelle	TV film
2011	Goodnight for Justice	Miss Landry	TV film
2011	Endgame	Pippa Venturi	Main role
2013	The Newsroom	Aubrey Lyons	Episode: "One Step Too Many"
2013	Hats Off to Christmas!	Ellie	TV film
2014	Motive	Chris Renway	Episode: "They Made Me a Criminal"
2014	Suits	Amy	Recurring role (season 4)
2016–2018	Travelers	Beth	5 episodes
2016–2020	You Me Her	Nina Martone	Main role
2024	Allegiance	Gillian Goode	7 episodes

Video game work by Melanie Papalia
Year	Title	Role	Notes
2015	Dying Light	Lynn	Voice
2015	Hatred	Female Pedestrian/Female Officer	Voice
2020	Cyberpunk 2077	Olivia	Voice & Mo-Cap
