= The American Success Company =

1980 film by William Richert

- Theatrical release poster
- Directed by: William Richert
- Screenplay by: William Richert; Larry Cohen
- Story by: Larry Cohen
- Produced by: Daniel H. Blatt; Edgar J. Scherick
- Starring: Jeff Bridges; Bianca Jagger; Ned Beatty; Belinda Bauer; Steven Keats
- Cinematography: Anthony B. Richmond
- Edited by: Ralph E. Winters
- Music by: Maurice Jarre
- Production company: Columbia Pictures
- Distributed by: Columbia Pictures
- Release dates: September 28, 1979 (Minneapolis); August 20, 1980 (United States)
- Running time: 91 minutes
- Countries: United States; West Germany
- Language: English

The American Success Company is a 1979 American-West-German comedy-drama film directed by William Richert and starring Jeff Bridges, Bianca Jagger, Ned Beatty, Belinda Bauer, and Steven Keats. The screenplay was written by Richert and Larry Cohen. Re-edited versions of the film have appeared under the titles American Success, Success, The Ringer, and Good as Gold.

== Premise ==
Harry Flowers is routinely humiliated both at home and at work (the German offices of an American credit card company). Fed up, he hires prostitute Corinne to help him gain revenge on his quirky wife Sarah and her father/his boss, the overbearing Mr. Elliott—all while enriching himself financially.

== Cast ==
- Jeff Bridges as Harry Flowers/Mack
- Bianca Jagger as Corinne
- Ned Beatty as Mr. Elliott
- Belinda Bauer as Sarah Flowers
- Steven Keats as Rick Duprez
- John Glover as Ernst
- Mascha Gonska as Greta
- Michael Durrell as Herman
- Eva Maria Meineke as Mrs. Heinemann
- Günter Meisner as maître d'
- Claudia Butenuth as Herman's secretary
- Peter Capell as Lichtenstein
- Marie Bardischewski as landlady
- Sebastian Baur as magician

== Production ==
The film was based on an original script by Larry Cohen. At one stage, he was going to make it starring Rock Hudson and Vanessa Redgrave, but this did not eventuate. Peter Sellers wanted to star, for $100,000, but Cohen could not raise finance on Sellers' name — this was just prior to the release of the 1975 film The Return of the Pink Panther. Michael Caine came close to starring, but Cohen eventually sold the script.

Director Richert and stars Jeff Bridges and Belinda Bauer went to Germany and filmed The American Success Company, whose distribution rights made enough money for Richert to fund the resumption of his oft-delayed 1979 thriller Winter Kills. During production in Germany, The American Success Company was known as The Ringer.

As a result of the executive at Columbia Pictures who bought the film rights leaving the studio before its release, the film never got wide distribution. (Cohen later claimed that Richert's changes to the script ruined the film.)

Writer/director Richert re-edited, re-titled and re-released the film as American Success in 1981 and then again as Success (with a new voiceover narration) in 1983.

== Reception ==
Janet Maslin of The New York Times reviewed the 1981 re-release as a "nutty and appealing . . . curiosity. . . . [T]hough it periodically wears thin, American Success is a buoyant and enterprising movie more often than not, and what it lacks in coherence it makes up in dash." Variety wrote, "Although almost everything that happens on screen is done with considerable style and a morbid sense of humor, lack of overall point ultimately sinks the picture." In a later review, however, Time Out called the film "a delightfully offbeat satire both on capitalism and on macho posing. . . . [T]he performances are superb, and Richert manages to keep the excesses of the script nicely under control. Disarmingly un-American in tone and message, it was perhaps not surprisingly shot abroad in Germany."
