= Caitlin Gerard =

American actress (born 1988)

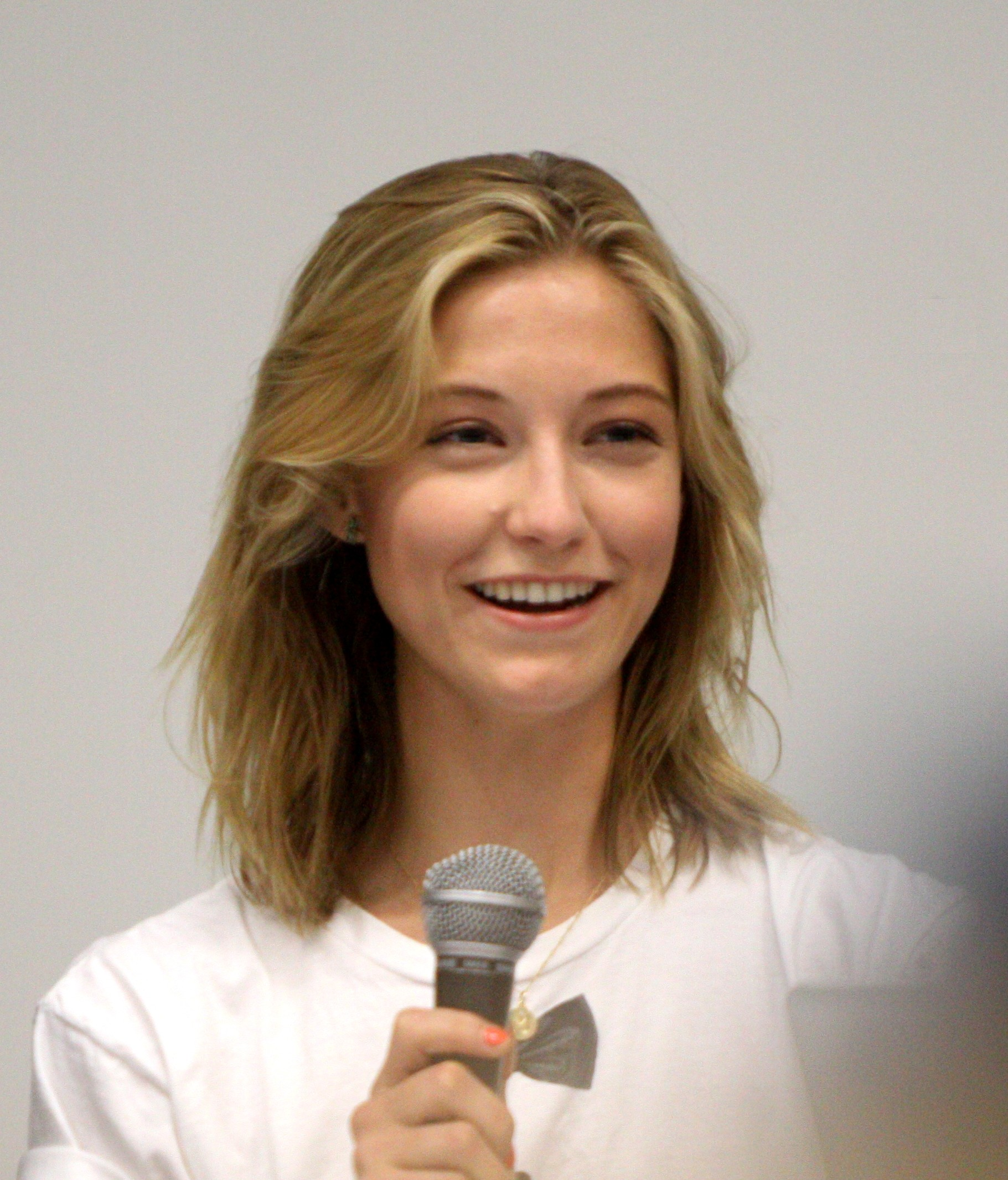
- Gerard in 2012
- Born: July 26, 1988 (age 37); Los Angeles, California, United States
- Occupations: Actress; filmmaker
- Years active: 2010–present
- Spouse: Griffin Goldsmith
- Children: 1

Caitlin Beverly Gerard (born July 26, 1988) is an American actress and filmmaker.

In film, Gerard is best known for her work in the horror genre, having had lead roles in Smiley (2012) and The Wind (2018), and a supporting role in Insidious: The Last Key (2018). She played Kim in Magic Mike (2012), and reprised the role in Magic Mike's Last Dance (2023).

In television, Gerard is known for her main cast roles as Amy Page on the MTV mockumentary sitcom Zach Stone Is Gonna Be Famous (2013) and Aubry Taylor on season 1 of the ABC anthology series American Crime (2015).

== Early life ==
Caitlin Beverly Gerard was born in Los Angeles on July 26, 1988. She attended the International School of Los Angeles, a private French K-12 school, and graduated from Malibu High School in 2006. She majored in English with a concentration in creative writing at UCLA.

== Career ==
Gerard appeared in AMC Theatres' pre-show snipes, namely the "Coming Soon" and the "Magic Chairs" snipes, from 2009 to 2013. She played Amy Page in the MTV mockumentary series Zach Stone Is Gonna Be Famous (2013) and had a leading role in the first season of the drama series American Crime (2015). She has appeared in horror films such as Smiley (2012), The Wind (2018), and Insidious: The Last Key (2018).

Gerard co-wrote and directed the short comedy film I Lost My Mother's Ashes (2019), and the music video Grocery Store (2023).

== Filmography ==
=== Film ===
| Year | Title | Role | Notes |
|---|---|---|---|
| 2010 | The Social Network | Ashleigh | |
| 2010 | The Awakening | Jessica | |
| 2011 | Answers to Nothing | French Girl | |
| 2012 | Magic Mike | Kim | |
| 2012 | Smiley | Ashley Brookes | |
| 2014 | Genvieve | Genvieve | Short film |
| 2014 | I Think I'm in Love with You | | Short film and producer |
| 2014 | Manifesto | Natalie | |
| 2015 | Pocket Listing | Jane | |
| 2015 | Hi-Tone | Janey | Short film |
| 2015 | Three Sheets | Stevie | Short film and producer |
| 2016 | The Assignment | Johnnie | |
| 2018 | The Wind | Lizzy Macklin | |
| 2018 | Insidious: The Last Key | Imogen Rainier | |
| 2019 | I Lost My Mother's Ashes | —N/a | Short film Co-writer, director and executive producer |
| 2022 | "TOW" | ABBIE AND MADDIE | |
| 2023 | Magic Mike's Last Dance | Kim | |
| 2023 | Grocery Store | | Music Video Director |

=== Television ===
| Year | Title | Role | Notes |
|---|---|---|---|
| 2012 | Jan | Jan | Lead role |
| 2012 | Vanessa & Jan | Jan | Main role |
| 2012 | Ruth & Erica | Jan | Episode: "September" |
| 2013 | Zach Stone Is Gonna Be Famous | Amy Page | Main role |
| 2015 | American Crime | Aubry Taylor | Main role (season 1) |
| 2017 | Incorporated | Kim | Episode: "Sweating the Assets" |
| 2017 | When We Rise | Jean | 2 episodes |
| 2018 | The Last Ship | Kelsi | Recurring role, 7 episodes |
| 2020 | Cherish the Day | Dana | Episode: "Genesis" |
