= Ladies Man (1999 TV series) =

American sitcom

- Genre: Sitcom
- Created by: Chris Thompson
- Starring: Alfred Molina; Sharon Lawrence; Betty White; Stephen Root; Alexa Vega; Shawna Waldron; Park Overall; Dixie Carter; Kaley Cuoco
- Music by: Jonathan Wolff; Rich Ragsdale
- Country of origin: United States
- Original language: English
- No. of seasons: 2
- No. of episodes: 30 (3 unaired)

Production
- Executive producers: Chris Thompson; Peter Noah; Ira Ungerleider; James Burrows; David Raether; Jim Vallely; Victor Levin; Susan Nirah Jaffee
- Producers: Joan Hyler; Alfred Molina; Richard Day; Lee Shallat Chemel; Janis Hirsch
- Camera setup: Multi-camera
- Running time: 30 minutes
- Production companies: Christopher Thompson Productions; Victor Levin Productions; CBS Productions; Columbia TriStar Television

Original release
- Network: CBS
- Release: September 20, 1999 – June 27, 2001

Ladies Man is an American television sitcom series created by Chris Thompson, starring Alfred Molina as Jimmy Stiles, a husband, father, son, ex-husband and son-in-law who lives with a number of women under one roof. The show was first broadcast on September 20, 1999, and lasted for two seasons on CBS until June 27, 2001. The series co-starred Betty White and is perhaps most memorable for reuniting White with both her Golden Girls co-stars Rue McClanahan and Estelle Getty (with Getty reprising her role as Sophia) in one of the later episodes.

== Cast ==
- Alfred Molina as Jimmy Stiles, a woodworker
- Sharon Lawrence as Donna Stiles, Jimmy's wife
- Betty White as Mitzi Stiles, Jimmy's mother
- Dixie Carter as Peaches (season 1), Donna's mother
- Park Overall as Claire Stiles (season 1), Jimmy's ex-wife
- Mariam Parris (pilot episode only), Shawna Waldron (season 1) and Kaley Cuoco (season 2) as Bonnie Stiles, Jimmy and Claire's teenage daughter
- Katie Volding (pilot episode only) and Alexa Vega as Wendy Stiles, Jimmy and Donna's young daughter
- Stephen Root as Gene, Jimmy's golfing buddy
- Rue McClanahan as Aunt Lou (2 episodes)

== Episodes ==
=== Series overview ===
Season	Episodes	Originally released	
Season	Episodes	First released	Last released
1	22	September 20, 1999	May 15, 2000
2	8	June 6, 2001	June 27, 2001

=== Season 1 (1999–2000) ===
No. overall	No. in season	Title	Directed by	Written by	Original release date	Viewers (millions)
1	1	"Pilot"	James Burrows	Chris Thompson	September 20, 1999	13.55
2	2	"Boys Can't Help It"	Lee Shallat-Chemel	Chris Thompson	September 27, 1999	12.67
3	3	"Regarding Eric"	Rob Schiller	Ira Ungerleider	October 4, 1999	11.34
4	4	"The Home Office"	Gil Junger	David Raether	October 11, 1999	11.80
5	5	"Jimmy's Song"	Gil Junger	Jim Vallely	October 18, 1999	11.76
6	6	"Country Clubbed"	Rob Schiller	Suzanne Myers & Cody Farley	October 25, 1999	11.98
7	7	"Neutered Jimmy"	Lee Shallat-Chemel	Peter Noah	November 1, 1999	13.54
8	8	"Getting Lucky"	Mark Cendrowski	Chris Thompson	November 8, 1999	11.38
9	9	"Park Rage"	Gil Junger	Jim Vallely	November 15, 1999	10.89
10	10	"Thanks for Nothing"	Amanda Bearse	Chris Thompson	November 22, 1999	10.80
11	11	"Money, Honey"	Tom Cherones	Peter Noah	November 29, 1999	12.87
12	12	"Aloha Christmas"	Gail Mancuso	Chris Thompson	December 13, 1999	13.21
13	13	"Gene's Date"	Amanda Bearse	Peter Noah	January 10, 2000	12.50
14	14	"12 Angry Kids"	Mark Cendrowski	Chris Thompson	January 17, 2000	13.60
15	15	"Breaking Up Really Isn't Hard to Do"	Gail Mancuso	Janis Hirsch	January 31, 2000	12.30
16	16	"Jimmy Dot Com"	Mark Cendrowski	Suzanne Myers & Cody Farley	February 7, 2000	10.80
17	17	"Travels with My Aunt"	Mark Cendrowski	Jim Vallely	February 14, 2000	11.94
18	18	"After You've Gone"	Shelley Jensen	Peter Noah	February 21, 2000	11.67
19	19	"Decent Proposal"	Shelley Jensen	Adam Hamburger & David Hamburger	April 17, 2000	12.23
20	20	"Aren't We Nice?"	Mark Cendrowski	Leslie Caveny	May 1, 2000	6.84
21	21	"Bad Muthas"	Wil Shriner	Alicia Sky Varinaitis	May 8, 2000	10.77
22	22	"Romance"	Chris Thompson	Chris Thompson	May 15, 2000	11.15

=== Season 2 (2001) ===
No. overall	No. in season	Title	Directed by	Written by	Original release date	Viewers (millions)
23	1	"Upright and Breathing"	Gordon Hunt	Victor Levin	June 6, 2001	5.39
24	2	"A Quiet Evening at Home"	Gordon Hunt	Victor Levin	June 6, 2001	5.20
25	3	"The 31-Inch High Club"	Dana deVally Piazza	Erik Shapiro & Patrick McCarthy	June 13, 2001	4.81
26	4	"Family Dinner"	Dana deVally Piazza	Torian Hughes	June 20, 2001	6.98
27	5	"The Happy Wanderer"	Victor Levin	Victor Levin	June 27, 2001	4.77
28	6	"No Cinco, Seis!"	Dana deVally Piazza	Richard Day	Unaired	N/A
29	7	"El Dutchy"	Mark Cendrowski	Susan Nirah Jaffee	Unaired	N/A
30	8	"The Estrogen Wave"	Dana deVally Piazza	Richard Day	Unaired	N/A
