= The Wind (2018 film) =

2018 film

- Theatrical release poster
- Directed by: Emma Tammi
- Written by: Teresa Sutherland
- Produced by: Christopher Alender; David Grove Churchill Viste
- Starring: Caitlin Gerard; Ashley Zukerman; Julia Goldani Telles; Miles Anderson
- Cinematography: Lyn Moncrief
- Edited by: Alexandra Amick
- Music by: Ben Lovett
- Production companies: Divide/Conquer; Soapbox Films
- Distributed by: IFC Midnight
- Release dates: September 10, 2018 (TIFF); April 5, 2019 (United States)
- Running time: 86 minutes
- Country: United States
- Language: English
- Box office: $130,974

The Wind is a 2018 American supernatural horror Western film directed by Emma Tammi in her solo feature directorial debut. It was written by Teresa Sutherland and stars Caitlin Gerard, Ashley Zukerman, Julia Goldani Telles, and Miles Anderson. Set in the mid-1800s on the American frontier, the film follows a woman who encounters a demonic entity while attempting to build a homestead with her husband and another married couple on an isolated patch of land.

The film premiered at the Toronto International Film Festival on September 10, 2018.

== Plot ==
In the mid-nineteenth century, Elizabeth "Lizzy" and Isaac Macklin left St. Louis to settle on the western frontier. They are later joined by the Harpers, Emma and Gideon, who move into a nearby abandoned cabin. The Macklins help the younger couple repair their new home and grow crops. As the wives bond, Lizzy confides in Emma about her stillborn son. One night, Emma is found hiding underneath her bed; Lizzy sedates her but not before discovering Emma's pregnancy. Emma later claims to be haunted by a demon seeking her child whom she plans to name after either one of the Macklins.

When her pregnancy nears its term, Emma suddenly shoots herself in the head with Lizzy's shotgun. Lizzy attempts to save the baby via caesarean section but is unsuccessful. The men bury Emma and her stillborn child at dawn and Gideon decides to return to Illinois. Isaac travels with him to buy supplies for the winter. As they depart, Lizzy's fear of demons resurfaces. While investigating the Harpers' empty cabin, she finds a diary in which Emma describes her disdain for Gideon and claims to bear Isaac's child. The next day, a local reverend travels through the area looking for shelter but transforms into a demon later that night. He attacks Lizzy who escapes to the cabin; she hides there until morning when she finds the reverend dead on the ground.

Isaac returns home the same day telling Lizzy he had met with the reverend earlier on the road, much to her shock. Gideon also returns to pack his remaining belongings, leaving behind a trunk of books for the Macklins. Inside the chest, Lizzy finds a tract about the "demons of the prairie" but Isaac argues with her over it, claiming it would reignite her prairie madness from when she was pregnant. As Isaac storms out, Lizzy is immediately assaulted by an unseen force, shattering the windows and throwing her across the room. She is stabbed in her side by a pair of scissors and passes out.

Lizzy reawakens to find herself tied to the bed. Isaac, having found Emma's diary, confronts Lizzy after realizing the truth: she murdered Emma and the unborn child out of jealousy. Lizzy, denying the murder, frees herself and fatally stabs Isaac with a glass shard. Stumbling outside at dawn, she reminisces about her first meeting with the reverend upon arriving at the frontier, when he gave her a similar tract warning about the demons of the prairie.

== Cast ==
- Caitlin Gerard as Elizabeth 'Lizzy' Macklin
- Ashley Zukerman as Isaac Macklin
- Julia Goldani Telles as Emma Harper
- Miles Anderson as The Reverend
- Dylan McTee as Gideon Harper
- Martin Patterson as Eli

== Production ==
=== Development ===
The screenplay for The Wind was written by Florida State University film student Teresa Sutherland, who developed it into a short film. Producer Christohper Alender saw the film and encouraged Sutherland to expand the screenplay into a full-length feature. Director Emma Tammi recounted:

When Teresa wrote the script—because she sat on it for many years and then wrote it very quickly, it was one of those things she had been thinking about for a long time—Chris was just in the process of setting up a film fund for three films and this was going to be the first one. We were all at Sundance and he was like, “I think you might be a good fit for this, do you want to read it?” and I did and I loved it. Then I met with Teresa and we really clicked, we shared a vision for what we felt like it could be. We did a couple of polished passes together, which was really great.

For research on the project, Tammi began reading firsthand narratives of women who lived in the American frontier in the mid-19th century. Stylistically, she cited Stanley Kubrick's The Shining (1980) as "one of the biggest references for this because I just felt that slow burn aspect of Kubrick’s pacing throughout the film and the environment ultimately coming in on our characters and transforming them." She also cited the films of Ingmar Bergman and "a lot of classic westerns," namely The Searchers (1956).

=== Filming ===
The Wind was shot on location in and around Santa Fe, New Mexico.

== Release ==
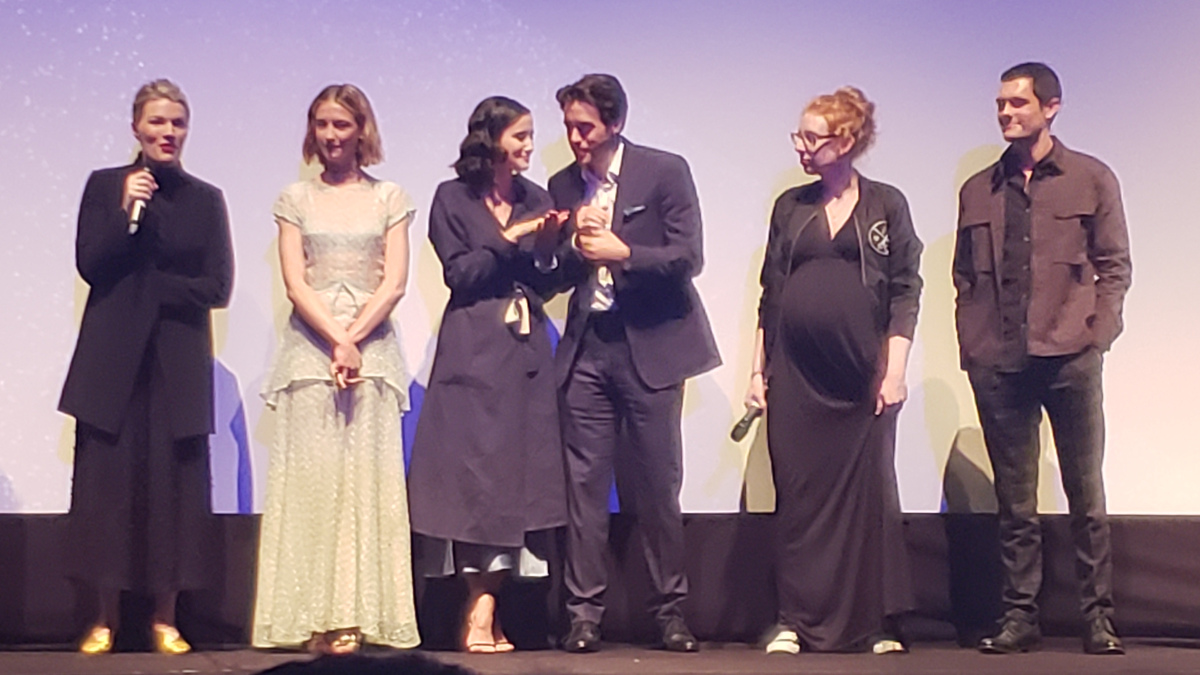
Emma Tammi, Caitlin Gerard, Julia Goldani Telles, Ashley Zukerman, Teresa Sutherland, and Dylan McTee at the film's Toronto premiere

The Wind had its world premiere at the Toronto International Film Festival on September 10, 2018, as part of the festival's Midnight Madness section.

The film was given a limited theatrical release in the United States by IFC Midnight on April 5, 2019.

=== Home media ===
Scream Factory released The Wind on DVD and Blu-ray on September 3, 2019.

== Reception ==
On review aggregator Rotten Tomatoes, The Wind holds an approval rating of 82% based on 67 reviews, with an average rating of 6.7/10. The site's critics' consensus reads, "Imperfect yet intriguing, The Wind offers horror fans an admirably ambitious story further distinguished by its fresh perspective and effective scares." On Metacritic, the film has a weighted average score of 66 out of 100, based on 14 critics, indicating "generally favorable reviews".

Jessica Kiang from Variety gave the film a positive review, writing, "The Wind doesn't seek to make infallible heroes of its women, but to understand and empathize with even their most unforgivable acts. And it's a hugely promising debut in terms of Tammi's steady, assured directorial craft." Jordan Mintzer from The Hollywood Reporter gave the film a mostly positive review, writing, "Well-shot and edited, with a script that keeps you guessing for a certain stretch of time, The Wind doesn't quite sustain the tension through the final reel, resorting to eye-rolling scare tactics that go from serious to way too silly. Nonetheless, it's refreshing to see such an original stab at this type of indie genre-bender, especially one told from a strictly female point of view."

== Promotional video game ==
Prior to its release, IFC Films commissioned a short horror game to promote the film. The game was created by independent developer Airdorf, and utilizes a style similar to that of Airdorf's Faith. The game was met with a positive reception, but criticised for its short length.
