= Ryan Kennedy =

Canadian actor and model (born 1982)

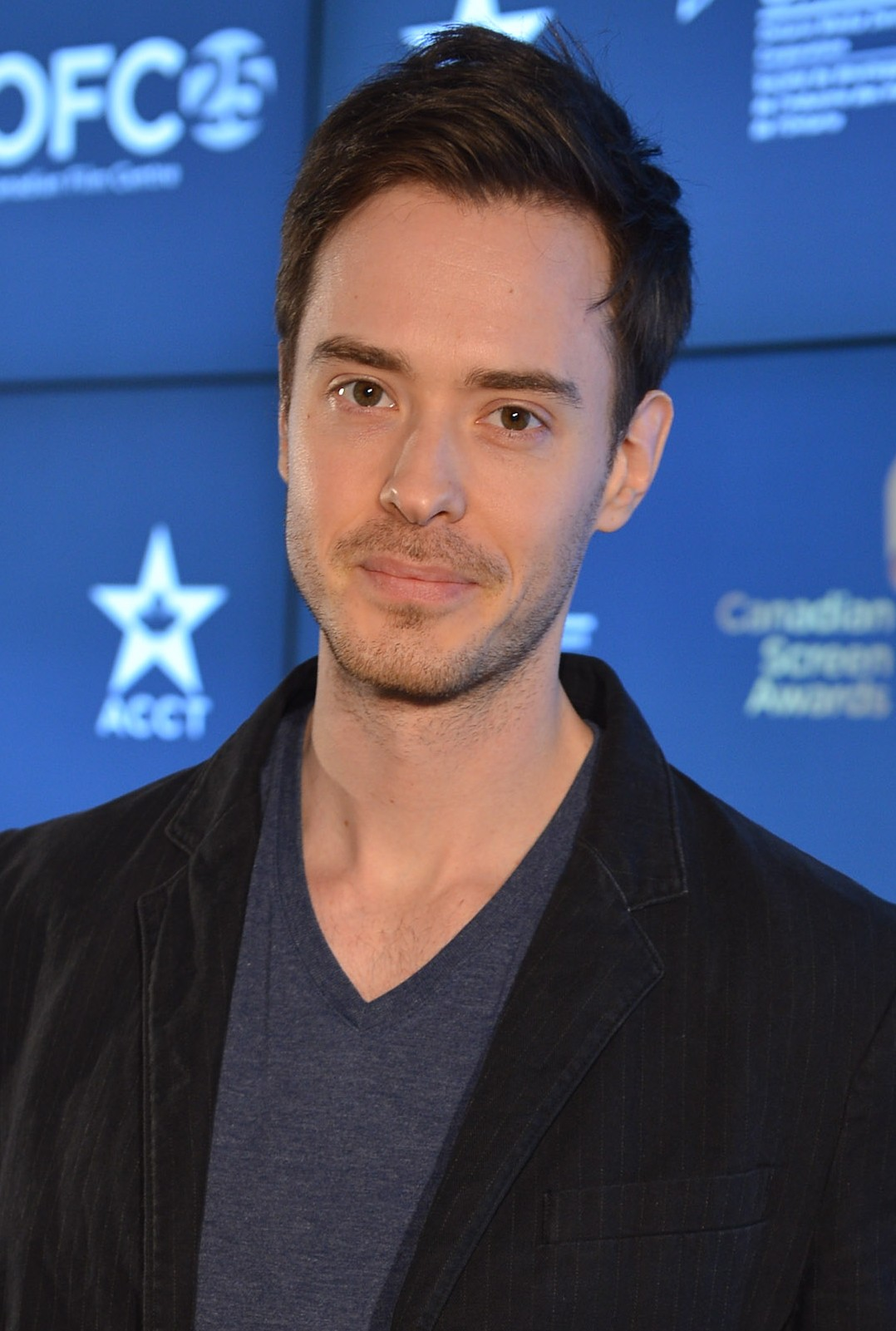
- Kennedy at the 2013 Canadian Screen Awards
- Born: December 6, 1982 (age 43); Winnipeg, Manitoba, Canada
- Occupations: Actor, model
- Years active: 1996–present

Ryan Kennedy (born December 6, 1982) is a Canadian actor and model. He is best known for his role "Travis Hollier" in the 2006 TV series Whistler and "Jake Harrow" in 2010 TV series Hellcats. Kennedy has also played Apollo 11 astronaut Michael Collins in the science fiction space drama series For All Mankind.

== Personal life ==
Ryan Kennedy was born in Winnipeg, Manitoba, and reared in Oakbank.

== Filmography ==
=== Films ===
Year	Title	Role
2003	More Than Meets the Eye: The Joan Brock Story	Med Student
2004	Category 6: Day of Destruction	Eric
2004	While I Was Gone	Duncan
2006	A Little Thing Called Murder	Randy Bates
2006	Just A Phase	Graham
2006	Shock to the System	Walter
2006	The Invisible	Matty
2007	Taming Tammy	Tristan
2008	Poison Ivy: The Secret Society	Blake Graves
2008	Storm Cell	Ryan
2008	Chasing the White Dragon	Ethan
2009	Ice Twisters	Gary
2009	The Break-Up Artist	Mike
2010	Super Hybrid	Bobby
2010	The Bend	Mike Campbell
2012	Hannah's Law	Doc Holliday
2013	Nearlyweds	David
2013	Embrace of the Vampire	Chris
2014	Lucky in Love	Liam
2016	Unleashing Mr. Darcy	Henry
2016	Twist of Fate	Jeff
2018	Marrying Mr. Darcy	Henry Robson
2019	Love and Communication (post-production)	Rob

=== Television ===
Year	Title	Role	Notes
2006	Whistler	Travis Hollier	Season 2, recurring character
2006	Blade: The Series	Cain	Season 1, episodes 2 and 3
2007	Hallmark Hall of Fame	Josh Murakami	Crossroads: A story of forgiveness
2007	About A Girl	Dan Gogebic	Season 1, episodes 5 and 6
2007	E-Talk Daily	Himself	On 5 February and 15 March
2008	Ogre		Television movie
2009	V	David	Season 1, episode 4
2009	Flashpoint	Justin Fraser	Season 2, episode 6: "Remote Control"
2009	Smallville	Rokk Krinn/Cosmic Boy	Season 8, episode 11: "Legion"; Season 8, episode 22: "Doomsday"
2009	Psych	Garvin	Season 4, episode 2: "He Dead"
2009	Stargate Universe	Dr. Williams	Season 1, episode: "Earth"
2009	Sanctuary	Darren Wilson	Season 2, episode 10: "Sleepers"
2010	Hellcats	Jake Harrow	Season 1, recurring character
2010	Caprica	Odin Sinclair	Season 1, 5 episodes
2014, 2017	Major Crimes	Richard "Ricky" Raydor	5 episodes
2015	The Unauthorized Melrose Place Story	Larry	Television film
2017–2019	Tin Star	Constable Nick McGillen	Main role
2019	For All Mankind	Michael Collins	3 episodes
2020	The Good Doctor	Brendan Lewis	Season 4, episode 5
