= Belinda Bauer (actress) =

Australian actress

Belinda Taubman Bauer
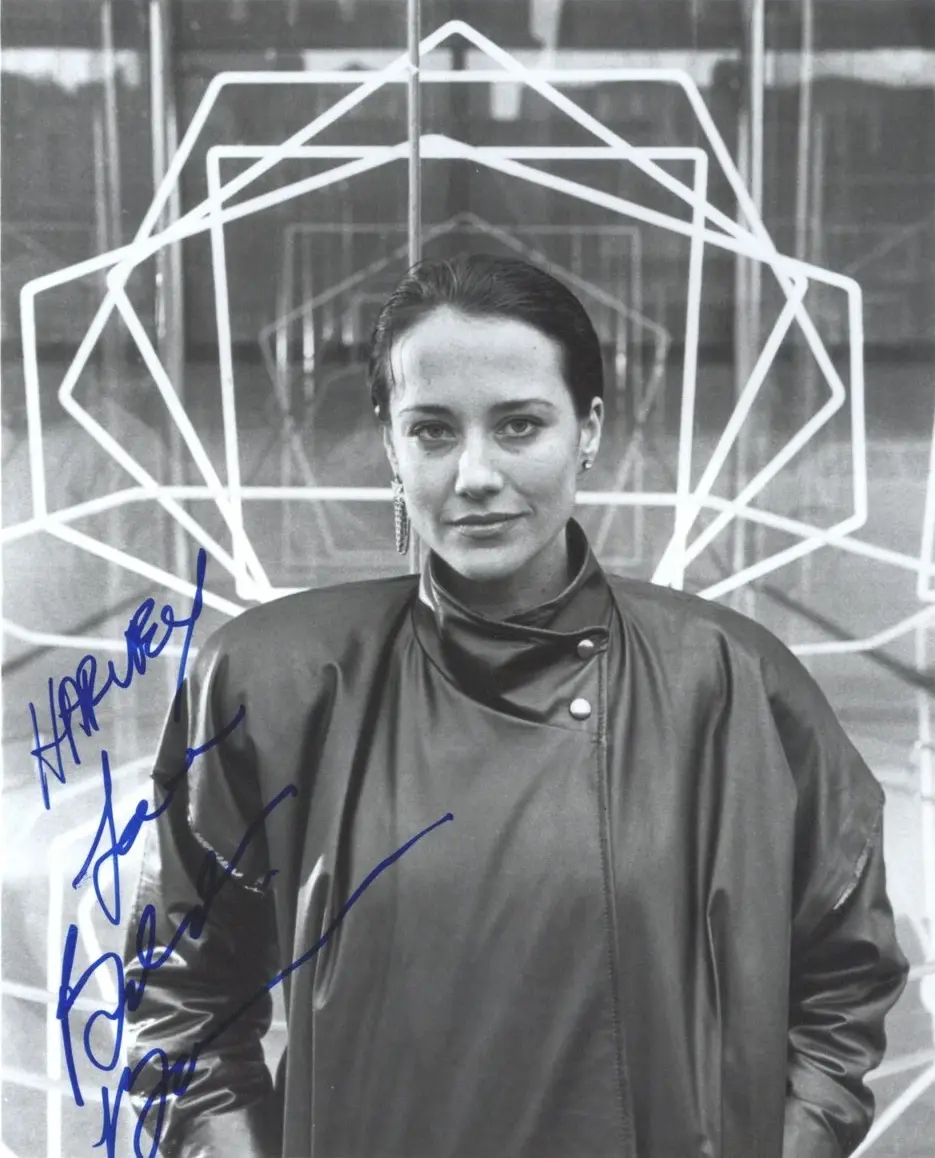
- Bauer in Starcrossed, 1985, signed publicity photo
- Born: Belinda Sylvia Taubman; 13 June 1950 (age 76); Pymble, New South Wales, Australia
- Occupations: Actress; psychologist
- Years active: 1979–1996

Belinda Sylvia Taubman Bauer (born 13 June 1950) is an Australian-born former actress and psychologist. She gained notice in the 1980s with roles in American films such as Winter Kills (1979) and Timerider: The Adventure of Lyle Swann (1982). Bauer also had a supporting role in the film Flashdance (1983) and a co-starring role as Dr. Juliette Faxx in RoboCop 2 (1990).

After retiring from acting in the mid-1990s, Bauer began a career in psychology and maintains practice in Los Angeles.

== Early life and career ==
Belinda Bauer was born Belinda Sylvia Taubman on 13 June 1950 in Sydney, Australia. Her great-grandfather, Nathaniel James Taubman, co-founded the Australian paint manufacturer Taubmans in 1901. Bauer grew up in Sydney and attended Abbotsleigh. She trained in ballet and performed as a dancer on Barry Crocker’s television program, The Sound of Music, in the late 1960s.

Under her birth name, Bauer entered beauty pageants. She won the Miss Queen of the Pacific title in 1968 and was a finalist in the Miss New South Wales contest in 1967. In the early 1970s, Bauer travelled abroad and eventually settled in New York City to pursue modelling and acting. During this period, she adopted the surname Bauer. She worked as a fashion model, including for Revlon cosmetics, and took acting classes.

== Acting career ==
Bauer's screen debut was a leading role in the conspiracy thriller Winter Kills (released 1979), appearing with Jeff Bridges and John Huston. She co-starred with Bridges again in the comedy The American Success Company (1980). Her subsequent roles included the time-travel film Timerider: The Adventure of Lyle Swann (1982) and a supporting part in Flashdance (1983). On television, she played the title role in the TV movie The Sins of Dorian Gray (1983) and the biblical character Delilah in the miniseries Samson and Delilah (1984). She also played the female lead in the pilot episode of the series Airwolf (1984).

Throughout the mid-1980s, Bauer appeared in thrillers and action films, including The Rosary Murders (1987) with Donald Sutherland and Act of Piracy (1990) with Gary Busey. She also had a cameo in the comedy UHF (1989). In 1990, she portrayed Dr. Juliette Faxx, an antagonist in the film RoboCop 2. The following year, she starred in Servants of Twilight (1991), a thriller adapted from a novel by Dean Koontz.

Bauer's final acting roles were in the mid-1990s. She starred in the television film A Case for Murder (1993) and had a supporting role in Poison Ivy II: Lily (1996). She retired from acting in 1996. Bauer has one screenwriting credit, for co-writing the screenplay for the film Happy Now (2001).

== Later life ==
After retiring from acting, Bauer pursued a degree in psychology. In 2000, she completed a master's program in spiritual psychology at the University of Santa Monica. She also trained at Oneness University in India. Since 2001, Bauer has operated a private counseling practice in Los Angeles.

== Filmography ==
=== Film ===
Year	Title	Role	Ref.
1979	Winter Kills	Yvette Malone	
1980	The American Success Company	Sarah Flowers	
1982	Timerider: The Adventure of Lyle Swann	Claire Cygne	
1983	Flashdance	Katie Hurley	
1987	The Rosary Murders	Pat Lennon	
1988	Act of Piracy	Sandy Andrews	
1989	UHF	Mud Wrestler	
1990	RoboCop 2	Dr. Juliette Faxx	
1991	Servants of Twilight	Christine Scavello	
1993	Necronomicon	Nancy Gilmore	
1996	Poison Ivy II: Lily	Angela Falk	

=== Television ===
Year	Title	Role	Notes	Ref.
1981	The Archer: Fugitive from the Empire	Estra	Television film	
1983	The Sins of Dorian Gray	Dorian Gray	Television film	
1984	Samson and Delilah	Delilah	Television film	
1984	Airwolf	Gabrielle Ademaur	Episode: "Shadow of the Hawke"	
1984	Airwolf: The Movie	Gabrielle Ademaur	Television film	
1985	Starcrossed	Mary the Alien	Television film	
1987	Tonight's the Night (aka The Game of Love)	Pamela Ahlberg	Television film	
1990	Murder, She Wrote	Carla Thyssen	Episode: "The Szechuan Dragon"	
1993	A Case for Murder	Joanna Gains	Television film	
1993	Diagnosis Murder	Amy Westin	Episode: "Amnesia"	
