= NightLights =

- Directed by: David Midell
- Written by: Nick Izzo; Adam Dick
- Produced by: Adam Dick; Keaton Wooden
- Starring: Shawna Waldron; Stephen Louis Grush; Kate Black-Spence; Jeff Garretson; Leslie Easterbrook
- Cinematography: John Klein
- Edited by: Kat Thomas
- Music by: Timo Elliston
- Production company: Play on Productions
- Distributed by: Indican Pictures
- Release date: 15 August 2014
- Running time: 96 minutes
- Country: United States
- Language: English

NightLights is a 2014 American drama film directed by David Midell, starring Shawna Waldron, Stephen Louis Grush, Kate Black-Spence, Jeff Garretson and Leslie Easterbrook.

== Cast ==
- Shawna Waldron as Erin Logan
- Stephen Louis Grush as Jacob Logan
- Kate Black-Spence as Nicole
- Jeff Garretson as Tim
- Leslie Easterbrook as Gina
- Rachel Chapman as Jenny
- Billy Dec as Medic #1
- Peter ten Brink as Bobby

== Reception ==
Robert Abele of the Los Angeles Times wrote that the film "achieves something admirably genuine about the queasy mixture of anguish and joy attached to caretaking for the most needy of loved ones."

Virginia Johnson of Library Journal wrote, "While some of the dialog surrounding Jacob's disability seems deliberate and awkward, this is still a poignant window on the internal debate experienced by caretakers and their ability to balance the desire for a life of their own with their caregiver responsibilities."

Ernest Hady of LA Weekly wrote, "There are moments in director David Midell's NightLights that play like PSAs, but that earnestness is paved over by wonderfully affecting performances."
