= Poison Ivy II: Lily =

- Home video release poster
- Directed by: Anne Goursaud
- Written by: Chloe King
- Produced by: Paul Hertzberg; Catalaine Knell
- Starring: Alyssa Milano; Xander Berkeley; Johnathon Schaech; Belinda Bauer; Victoria Haas; Camilla Belle; Mychal Wilson; Howard Brown
- Cinematography: Suki Medencevic
- Edited by: Terilyn A. Shropshire
- Music by: Joseph Williams
- Production companies: CineTel Pictures; MG Entertainment
- Distributed by: New Line Home Video
- Release date: January 16, 1996
- Running time: 102 minutes
- Country: United States
- Language: English

Poison Ivy II: Lily is a 1996 American direct-to-video erotic thriller film directed by Anne Goursaud, written by Chloe King and stars Alyssa Milano. It is a sequel to the 1992 film Poison Ivy and the second installment of the Poison Ivy film series. The film was released by New Line Home Video on January 16, 1996.

== Plot ==
Lily is a sheltered art student from Michigan attending college in California. She finds an apartment and soon notices that her roommates, Tanya (a friendly lesbian artist who becomes a good friend to Lily), Bridgette (a cruel and taunting artist who initially takes an immediate dislike to her), and Robert (the silent but talented musician), aren't quite normal. One day, Lily discovers a box of items belonging to a girl named Ivy. In the box, she finds nude pictures of the girl and her diary. She is immediately drawn to the content, desiring to have the girl's sexual confidence and fearlessness. In class, she has trouble expressing herself, unlike Gredin, an attractive co-student and sculptor whom she soon starts dating. Meanwhile, she has found a job babysitting Daphna, the daughter of her art teacher Donald Falk, a man who has betrayed his wife multiple times by having sex with his female students.

Slowly, Lily becomes obsessed with Ivy's letters and photos, attempting to take over her image. She cuts her hair and starts wearing more revealing clothes. Gredin grows even more attracted to her, and they begin a sexual relationship. He is unamused by the amount of private time that she spends with Donald, but she explains that it's because of the babysitting. Lily inspires Donald to perform art again, having noticed that he's been afraid to express himself. She agrees to pose nude for him. He falls in love with her, which affects his marriage to Angela. One day, Lily thinks she catches Gredin and Bridgette together. Feeling upset, she pierces her belly button and starts to rebel, thereby estranging herself from her friends. At a Halloween party, she enjoys the attention that she is getting from men, and she amuses herself; until she sees Gredin intimately dancing with another girl. Trying to make him jealous, she kisses a masked guy, who turns out to be Robert. She eventually has sex with Gredin, but he dumps her the next day after realizing how much she has changed.

Meanwhile, Angela has found Donald's drawing of Lily and thinks that he is having an affair with her. Donald, already depressed since he saw Lily kissing Gredin, takes it out on Lily. He admits that he is in love with her and tries to kiss her. She is initially unamused by his attempts, but they eventually engage in sexual activity. They are quickly interrupted though and Lily leaves. She soon reunites with Gredin. Not much later, Donald’s invites Lily to have Thanksgiving dinner with his family. She brings Gredin with her, which upsets Donald. After being asked to help put Daphna to bed, Lily ends up alone with Donald and he rapes her. She’s unable to stop him and they are soon caught by Daphna. Devastated, Daphna runs out of the home and into the street, where she is hit by a car. Lily, traumatized by what happened that night, returns home and destroys everything that has to do with Ivy.

Gredin arrives to reveal that Daphna has survived, but a now psychotic Donald knocks him out before he enters Lily's room. Donald tries to attack Lily, but Gredin reawakens and begins fighting with him. Donald eventually beats him down and Lily runs upstairs. As Donald chases after her, he runs into Robert, who informs him that the police are on their way. Donald throws him down the stairs and follows Lily up to the roof. After a brief scuffle, Donald slips off the edge of the roof and tries to take Lily with him. But Gredin is able to pull Lily out of his grasp and Donald falls to his death. In the aftermath of the events, Lily contemplates dropping out of school and moving back to Michigan. However, after she and Gredin admit their love for each other, Lily decides to stay in California.

== Cast ==
- Alyssa Milano as Lily Leonetti
- Johnathon Schaech as Gredin
- Xander Berkeley as Donald Falk
- Belinda Bauer as Angela Falk
- Camilla Belle as Daphna Falk
- Kathryne Dora Brown as Tanya
- Walter Kim as Robert
- Victoria Haas as Bridgette
- Tara Ellison as Catherine
- Mychal Wilson as Spin
- Joey Krees as Peter the Performance Artist
- Kate Rodger as Isabel
- Howard Brown as Rocco

== Production ==
The film is known as one of lead actress Alyssa Milano's attempts to break her child star image. She appeared in several soft erotic films, including Poison Ivy II. When this sequel was in production, Milano was cast because of her 'recognition factor'. Director Anne Goursaud worked previously with Milano on Embrace of the Vampire (1994), and they worried Poison Ivy II wouldn't be as daring as that film. They decided to go into another direction, not using Milano as the primary sex symbol in the film, but her co-star Johnathon Schaech.

== Release ==
=== Home media ===
After the release, it was mostly promoted for the sex scenes featuring Milano. Goursaud admitted that the film mostly had a following with boys, but insisted that there were female fans as well. Although not as successful as Embrace of the Vampire, the film still did very well in home video sales. Critics, however, dismissed the film as softcore porn and it received mostly negative reviews.

== Reception ==
=== Critical response ===
Review aggregator website Rotten Tomatoes reports that 14% of 7 critics gave the film a positive review, with an average rating of 3.66 out of ten.

== Sequel ==
A sequel titled Poison Ivy: The New Seduction, was released in 1997.
