= Shawna Waldron =

American actress

- Occupation: Actress
- Years active: 1994–present

Shawna Waldron is an American actress. Waldron is best known for her roles as Becky O'Shea in the 1994 sports comedy film Little Giants, Lucy Shepherd in the 1995 The American President and as Bonnie Stiles on CBS television series Ladies Man.

== Career ==
Waldron was featured in a string of commercial roles before landing the part of Becky "Icebox" O'Shea, the only girl on a pee-wee football team, in the movie Little Giants. Little Giants is considered her feature film debut (the film The New Kid, in which she also acted, has never been released). After starring in Little Giants, Waldron went on to play Michael Douglas' daughter in the movie The American President.

Waldron's first television role was in the pilot for CBS's Morning Glory. She then guest-starred on the series Malony in which she played the dramatic role of a teen who had witnessed a murder.

Waldron was nominated for Best Performance in a TV comedy series, Supporting Young Actress category from the Twenty-first Annual Young Artist Awards for 1998–1999 for her role in Ladies Man.

== Filmography ==
=== Film ===
Year	Film	Role	Director	Notes
1994	Little Giants	Becky 'Icebox' O'Shea	Duwayne Dunham	
1995	The American President	Lucy Shepherd	Rob Reiner	
2001	The Yellow Sign	Tess Reardon/Camilla	Aaron Vanek	
2004	To Kill a Mockumentary	Samantha	Stephen Wallis	also producer and writer
2009	3 Days in L.A.	Amanda	Marco Capalbo	
2010	Cyrus: Mind of a Serial Killer	Chloe	Mark Vadik	
2012	Lizzie	Maggie	David Dunn Jr.	
2014	The Exorcism Diaries	Caz	Scott McCullough	Short film
2014	Stitch	Serafina	Ajai	
2014	NightLights	Erin Logan	David Midell	
2016	Dead Man Rising	Clara	Thomas L. Callaway	

=== Television ===
Year	Title	Role	Notes
1996	Moloney	Jennifer Simms	1.05 "Clueless"
1998	The Wonderful World of Disney	Beryl Andrews	1.16 "Mr. Headmistress"
1998	A Change of Heart	Sarah Marshall	Television film
1999	Family Rules	Anne Harrison	6 episodes
1999	Ladies Man	Bonnie Stiles	21 episodes, 1999–2000
2002	Flatland	Tess	1.15 "Infection"
2003	Aftermath	Tess	Television film alternate title A Long Way Home
2007	Stupidface	Unknown	1.11 "Log Cabin in Space: Flashback"
2008	Poison Ivy: The Secret Society	Azalea Berges	Television film
2013	Police Guys	Shawna	Television film

=== Producer ===
Year	Film	Notes
2004	To Kill a Mockumentary	
2009	Char·ac·ter	Documentary
2010	Char·ac·ter: The Interviews	Documentary

== Awards and nominations ==
Year	Nominated work	Award	Category	Result
2000	Ladies Man	Young Artist Award	Best Performance in a TV Comedy Series - Supporting Young Actress	Nominated
2013	Police Guys	Action On Film/WAB Award	Outstanding Cast Performance	Won
2013	Police Guys	Action On Film Award	Outstanding Cast Performance	Won
2014	NightLights	Blue Whiskey Film Festival Blue Grass Award	Best Actress	Won
