= Poison Ivy (1992 film) =

1992 film by Katt Shea

- Theatrical release poster
- Directed by: Katt Shea
- Screenplay by: Andy Ruben; Katt Shea
- Story by: Melissa Goddard
- Produced by: Andy Ruben
- Starring: Tom Skerritt; Sara Gilbert; Cheryl Ladd; Drew Barrymore
- Cinematography: Phedon Papamichael
- Edited by: Gina Mittelman
- Music by: David Michael Frank
- Production company: MG Entertainment
- Distributed by: New Line Cinema
- Release dates: January 21, 1992 (Sundance); May 8, 1992 (United States)
- Running time: 88 minutes
- Country: United States
- Language: English
- Budget: $3 million
- Box office: $1.8 million

Poison Ivy is a 1992 American erotic thriller film directed by Katt Shea. It stars Drew Barrymore, Sara Gilbert, Tom Skerritt and Cheryl Ladd. The original music score was composed by David Michael Frank. The film was shot in Los Angeles.

The film premiered at the Sundance Film Festival on January 21, 1992, where it was nominated for the Grand Jury prize of Best Film. Poison Ivy was released by New Line Cinema in the United States on May 8, 1992. Although it did not fare very well at the box office, grossing $1,829,804 with its limited theatrical release to 20 movie theaters, the film received favorable word-of-mouth and became a success on cable and video in the mid-1990s. It has since gained status as a cult film, and is the first installment in a Poison Ivy film series that includes three direct-to-video sequels.

== Plot ==
Sylvie Cooper is a troubled teenage student at an expensive private school. She meets and befriends a poor street-smart girl whose name she does not know. When a dog is hit by a car, the girl kills it by striking it with a metal bar. Sylvie gives the girl the nickname "Ivy" after seeing a stick-on tattoo of the plant she has on her thigh.

Sylvie's father Darryl, against whom she is rebelling and with whom she frequently feuds, picks her up from school one day; Ivy asks for a ride. Ivy sits in the front with him and flirtatiously uncrosses her legs. Sylvie later confides in Ivy that Darryl is not her biological father and that she once tried to die by suicide. A few days later, Sylvie invites Ivy to her house, and Ivy wins the affection of Georgie, Sylvie's chronically ill mother.

Soon after, as both of Sylvie's parents enjoy Ivy's company, Ivy practically moves in. The girls share clothes and Sylvie's bed, and, as they have similar figures, Georgie lends Ivy some of her clothes. However, Ivy starts inappropriately flirting with Darryl, as well as manipulating Sylvie into getting a permanent tattoo. Ivy also deduces that Sylvie lied about her suicide attempt and about Darryl not being her biological father.

Darryl throws a party at the house to improve his failing career, and enlists Sylvie to help him. Ivy is able to manipulate the situation so that Sylvie is forced to leave the house while she remains to help. Ivy dresses seductively during the party and coerces Darryl, a recovering alcoholic, into drinking champagne. He embraces her but is caught by Georgie. Ivy apologizes, claiming that Darryl was under stress and she was merely comforting him. Georgie believes her, accepts a glass of champagne drugged with sleeping pills, and falls asleep. In the bed while Georgie sleeps, Ivy coaxes Darryl into performing oral sex on her.

Sylvie becomes increasingly irritated with Ivy's growing presence in her family. Her anger reaches a breaking point when even her dog chooses Ivy over her. Sylvie storms off and skips school to spend some time alone. Darryl picks up Ivy and drives them into the forest, where they drink and have sex.

The next morning, Georgie walks onto her balcony. Ivy walks up behind her and without warning, pushes her off the balcony to her death. As Georgie was known to be gravely ill and had previously threatened to end her life, Ivy is not suspected.

A few weeks later, Ivy convinces Sylvie to take her out for a joy ride in Georgie's old sports car. When Sylvie becomes suspicious of her involvement in Georgie's death, Ivy crashes the car, then moves the unconscious Sylvie into the driver's seat to make it appear that she was the one driving.

In the hospital, Sylvie hallucinates that her mother visits her, and sneaks out to return home, continuing to have hallucinations of her mother on the way. Once inside, she sees Darryl and Ivy having sex, and flees in horror. Ivy inadvertently lets it slip that she was driving during the accident, causing Darryl to realize that everything she has said has been a lie. He leaves to find Sylvie.

Ivy goes upstairs to Georgie's old room and stands in the balcony. Sylvie approaches from behind, deliriously seeing Ivy as her dead mother. When Ivy kisses her in a suggestive manner, it breaks her out of the delusion. After a brief scuffle, Sylvie pushes Ivy off the balcony to her death. Ambiguously, Sylvie narrates that she still loves and misses "her".

== Cast ==
- Sara Gilbert as Sylvie Cooper
- Drew Barrymore as Ivy
- Tom Skerritt as Darryl Cooper
- Cheryl Ladd as Georgie Cooper
- Alan Stock as Bob
- Jeanne Sakata as Isabelle
- E. J. Moore as Kid
- J. B. Quon as Another Kid
- Michael Goldner as Man in Car
- Charley Hayward as Tiny
- Time Winters as Old Man
- Billy Kane as James
- Tony Ervolina as Man on Screen
- Mary Gordon Murray as M.D.
- Leonardo DiCaprio as Guy

== Production ==
Producers Melissa Goddard and Peter Morgan brought the original idea to New Line. The studio hired Katt Shea, who had made a number of movies for Roger Corman; according to head of production Sara Risher, the studio wanted "a teenage Fatal Attraction".

The film developed greatly from this premise. There were three different drafts of the script and four different endings. According to Shea, the original ending had Ivy getting away with her crimes and hitch-hiking along a road. However, New Line insisted that Ivy be punished and made her shoot a new ending where Ivy died. At that point, New Line wanted Shea to revive the character for sequels, which the director refused to do. Shea now says she regrets the decision.

Shea says that she never regarded Ivy as villainous, but rather as a tragic character who just wants to be loved. She credits this for the film's popularity.

== Reception ==
=== Critical response ===
The film debuted at the Sundance Film Festival where, according to The New York Times, viewers were "either enraptured or insulted". At the Seattle International Festival of Women Directors, it was perceived to be politically incorrect. Shea stated:

I always told New Line it was going to be different from what they thought. I'm out to prove it's possible to make a film that's really artistic, that's an honest expression that comes from me and that can still be commercial. I told them I can only make movies for myself. I just know that if I really love it there's going to be a market for it.

On Rotten Tomatoes, it has an approval rating of 39%, rating based on 33 reviews. The site's critics consensus reads: "An unpleasant thriller that lacks the self-awareness to dilute its sordid undertones, Poison Ivy is liable to give audiences a rash." On Metacritic, it has a score of 51 out of 100, based on reviews from 24 critics, indicating "mixed or average" reviews.

Variety wrote, "Suicide, hints of lesbianism, murder, staged accidents and every other applicable melodramatic contrivance is dragged in. Unfortunate thesps take it all very seriously, while technical aspects are emptily polished." The Los Angeles Times praised Shea's direction, but criticized the plot as entirely predictable, writing: "We in the audience are so far ahead of the people on the screen that there are no surprises, just the inevitable sound of the inevitable shoe dropping."

Roger Ebert of the Chicago Sun-Times gave it 2½ stars out of 4 and wrote, "Here the casting is so wrong that nothing quite works." Janet Maslin of The New York Times wrote, "Katt Shea, who directed and co-wrote "Poison Ivy," displays a gleeful enthusiasm for the B-movie genre to which her film essentially belongs, as well as a grasp of the form's more delicate possibilities. "Poison Ivy" never resorts to overt malice when something more quietly sinister will do."

The character Ivy was ranked at number six on the list of the top 26 "bad girls" of all time by Entertainment Weekly.

== Sequels ==
Poison Ivy spawned three sequels: Poison Ivy II: Lily in 1996, Poison Ivy: The New Seduction in 1997 and Poison Ivy: The Secret Society in 2008.

== See also ==
- The Crush (1993 film)
