= Conspiracy fiction =

Subgenre of thriller fiction

The conspiracy thriller or paranoid thriller is a subgenre of thriller fiction. The protagonists of conspiracy thrillers are often journalists or amateur investigators who find themselves (often inadvertently) pulling on a small thread which unravels a vast conspiracy that ultimately goes "all the way to the top." The complexities of historical fact are recast as a morality play in which bad people cause bad events, and good people identify and defeat them. Conspiracies are often played out as "man-in-peril", or "woman-in-peril", stories, or yield quest narratives similar to those found in whodunits and detective stories.

A common theme in such works is that characters uncovering the conspiracy encounter difficulty ascertaining the truth amid the deceptions: rumors, lies, propaganda, and counter-propaganda build upon one another until what is conspiracy and what is coincidence become entangled. Many conspiracy fiction works also include the theme of secret history and paranoid fiction.

== Literature ==
John Buchan's 1915 novel The Thirty-Nine Steps weaves elements of conspiracy and man-on-the-run archetypes. Dashiell Hammett's 1924 short story "Nightmare Town" is conspiracy fiction on a small scale, depicting an Arizona town that exists as part of an insurance-fraud scheme, and a detective slowly uncovering the truth. Graham Greene's 1943 novel Ministry of Fear (brought to the big screen by Fritz Lang in 1944) combines all the ingredients of paranoia and conspiracy familiar to aficionados of the 1970s thrillers, with additional urgency and depth added by its wartime backdrop. Greene himself credited Michael Innes as the inspiration for his "entertainment".

After World War II, several fictional works explored the clandestine machinations and conspiracies beneath the orderly fabric of political life. In 1945, the Canadian-American psychologist and military hypnotist George Estabrooks collaborated with the detective novelist Richard Lockridge on Death in the Mind, which explored how post-hypnotics suggestion could be used to create unwitting spies. Conspiracy fiction in the US reached its zenith in the 1960s and 1970s in the wake of a number of high-profile scandals and controversies, most notably the Vietnam War, the assassinations of John F. Kennedy, Robert F. Kennedy, and Martin Luther King Jr., as well as the Watergate scandal and the subsequent resignation of Richard Nixon from the presidency. The American novelist Richard Condon wrote a number of conspiracy thrillers, including the seminal The Manchurian Candidate (1959), and Winter Kills (1974), which was made into a film by William Richert in 1979. Illuminatus! (1969–1971), a trilogy by Robert Shea and Robert Anton Wilson, is regarded by many as the definitive work of 20th-century conspiracy fiction. Set in the late '60s, it is a psychedelic tale which fuses mystery, science fiction, horror, and comedy in its depiction (and mourning, and mocking) of one of the more paranoid periods of recent history. Thomas Pynchon's The Crying of Lot 49 (1966) includes a secretive conflict between cartels dating back to the Middle Ages. Gravity's Rainbow also draws heavily on conspiracy theory in describing the motives and operations of the Phoebus cartel as well as the development of ballistic missiles during World War II. Pynchon's Inherent Vice (2009) also involves an intentionally ambiguous conspiracy involving a group known as the Golden Fang.

John Macgregor's 1986 novel Propinquity describes an attempt by a modern couple to revive the frozen body of a gnostic medieval Queen, buried deep under Westminster Abbey. Their attempt to expose the feminine aspect of Christianity's origins results in fierce Church opposition and, eventually, an international manhunt. Umberto Eco's Foucault's Pendulum (1988) features a story in which the staff of a publishing firm, intending to create a series of popular occult books, invent their own occult conspiracy, over which they lose control as it begins to supplant the truth. The popular 2003 novel The Da Vinci Code by Dan Brown draws on conspiracy theories involving the Roman Catholic Church, Opus Dei and the Priory of Sion. Other contemporary authors who have used elements of conspiracy theory in their work include Margaret Atwood, William S. Burroughs, Don DeLillo, James Ellroy, Joseph Heller, Robert Ludlum, David Morrell and James Clancy Phelan.

One of the first science fiction novels to deal with a full-blown conspiracy theory was Eric Frank Russell's Dreadful Sanctuary (1948). This deals with a number of sabotaged space missions and the apparent discovery that Earth is being quarantined by aliens from other planets of the Solar System. As the novel progresses, it emerges that this view is a paranoid delusion perpetuated by a small but powerful secret society. Philip K. Dick wrote a large number of short stories where vast conspiracies were employed (usually by an oppressive government or other hostile powers) to keep common people under control or enforce a given agenda. Other popular science fiction writers whose work features conspiracy theories include William Gibson, John Twelve Hawks, and Neal Stephenson.

In the 2019 conspiracy sci-fi thriller, Reality by DC Wince, the main characters unwittingly discover the 9/11 plot that has been created by Metatron, an artificially intelligent supercomputer controlled by a secret powerful group called The Syndicate. After being kidnapped, they attempt to survive the sinister group's Reality game in the Sahara Desert and warn the world of the impending terrorist attacks.

== Film and television ==
In 1944, Fritz Lang made a movie called Ministry of Fear in which the protagonist must expose an apparent charity organization as being a front for Nazi spies. In 1958, Orson Welles made a movie called Touch of Evil, co-starring Charlton Heston and himself in which a Mexican police officer (Heston) works with an American police Captain (Welles) the latter of whom is ultimately revealed as the true villain who has repeatedly secured his convictions through planting evidence and attempts to cover up this plot. The first season of the 1966 television series Star Trek includes an episode wherein a crewman fakes his own death and frames Captain Kirk for being responsible through criminal negligence to get him court-martialed whilst simultaneously tampering with the (seemingly infallible) Enterprise computer to ensure conviction.

In the 1973 dystopian science-fiction film Soylent Green, Charlton Heston plays a police officer who investigates the murder of a businessman and discovers that the elite have come with a scam to enrich themselves by converting dead humans to a synthetic food substance called Soylent Green, and those responsible for the conspiracy use homicide to silence those including Heston's character who seek to expose that "Soylent Green is people". In 1976, director Alan J. Pakula and screenwriter William Goldman made the movie All the President's Men, based on the true story of the effort to expose President Nixon's crimes which the government tried to cover up.

In 1985, George P. Cosmatos made the movie Rambo: First Blood Part II (sequel to the 1982 film First Blood) starring Sylvester Stallone as John Rambo, a Vietnam War veteran who seeks to rescue American prisoners of war left behind in Vietnam whose existence has been covered up. In 1993, Chris Carter created the television series The X-Files about a pair of FBI agents dealing with extraterrestrial life forms whose existence the government deliberately conceals. In 2008, J. J. Abrams created a television series Fringe which is about an FBI agent, a brilliant scientist and his estranged son investigates unexplained cases related to government conspiracy and a parallel universe.

The 2005 television series Prison Break depicts a man who deliberately gets himself sent to jail to help his brother break out after said brother was framed for the murder of the Vice President's brother and sentenced to death as a result of an elaborate conspiracy. The television series The Mentalist, 2008–2015, revolves around Patrick Jane, whose investigation after the serial killer known as Red John, reveals a secret organization inside law enforcement. The 2013 series The Blacklist centres on an elusive criminal mastermind who strikes a deal with the FBI in an effort to take down the secret Cabal that framed him whose members include the Attorney General, Secretary of State and National Security advisor. The Netflix series House of Cards depicts an ambitious and Machiavellian congressman who kills his way to the presidency and goes to great lengths to conceal that fact. The Canadian cartoon Detentionaire revolves around a conspiracy involving hypnosis and an ancient pre-human civilization.

== See also ==
- Illuminati in popular culture
- List of assassinations in fiction
- List of conspiracy-thriller films and television series
- Mystery fiction
- Spy fiction
- Vril
