= Mr. and Mrs. North (TV series) =

American mystery television series (1952–1954)

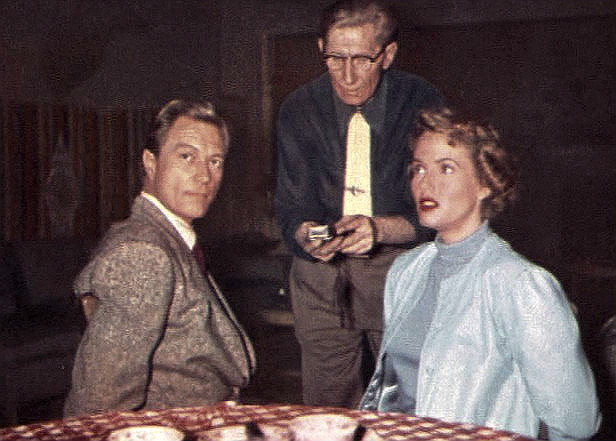
- Richard Denning and Barbra Britton on the set of Mr. and Mrs. North
- Genre: Mystery; Comedy
- Directed by: Ralph Murphy; Lew Landers; Paul Landres; George Blair; Marc Daniels
- Starring: Barbara Britton; Richard Denning; Francis De Sales
- Theme music composer: John Rarig
- Country of origin: United States
- Original language: English
- No. of seasons: 2
- No. of episodes: 57 (list of episodes)

Production
- Executive producers: John W. Loveton; William Collier, Jr.; Bernard Schubert
- Producer: John W. Loveton
- Cinematography: Kenneth Peach; Ellis W. Carter; Stuart Thompson
- Running time: 30 min
- Production companies: Bernard L. Schubert Productions; Federal Telefilms

Original release
- Network: CBS (Season 1); NBC (Season 2)
- Release: October 3, 1952 – May 25, 1954

Mr. and Mrs. North (stylized as Mr. & Mrs. North) is an American television mystery series that was broadcast on CBS from October 3, 1952, to September 25, 1953, and on NBC from January 26, 1954, to May 25, 1954, (with reruns continuing until July 20, 1954).

== Background ==
The concept and characters of Mr. and Mrs. North originated in The New Yorker magazine. A series of novels by Frances and Richard Lockridge followed. Those works were adapted into a radio series that began as a situation comedy but evolved into "a lighthearted murder mystery show". On May 19, 1946, NBC broadcast an episode of Mr. and Mrs. North as an experiment. John McQuade portrayed Jerry North, and Maxine Stuart played Pamela North. Vinton Hayworth and Millard Mitchell had the roles of lieutenant Weigand and detective Mullins, respectively. Fred Coe produced and directed, and the Lockridges were the writers. A pilot of a TV adaptation was presented on Colgate Theatre on July 4, 1949, with Joseph Allen Jr. and Mary Lou Taylor in the title roles. John Loveton was the producer, Marc Daniels was the director, and Hector Chevigny was the writer.

== Overview ==
Richard Denning and Barbara Britton starred as Jerry North and his wife, Pamela. During World War II he was a lieutenant in the Navy, and he was a former private detective who had become a publisher; she was "a beautiful and fashion-conscious woman" who had an instinct for detecting when foul play was involved in a situation. She usually dragged him into such situations and he acquiesced, rather than trying to argue with her. The spouses differed in their approaches to solving cases. Pamela used "some mysterious inner sense" that often led her to a mystery's solution, while Jerry approached each case more carefully, "figuratively plodding up the hills and down the valleys of evidence". The Norths lived in an apartment in Greenwich Village in New York City. In each episode they encountered a murder mystery. Francis DeSales portrayed Bill Weigand, who was their friend and a lieutenant in the New York Police Department's Homicide Division.

When the program was moved to NBC, that network promised "a more sophisticated approach" in episodes, noting that Pam "will emerge as a somewhat sharper character", becoming more competitive with Jerry and trying to outsmart him. The on-screen interaction between Denning and Britton led some viewers to think that they were married in real life. One fan sought autographs from the two when they were dining together at a restaurant. She looked at the signatures and said, "Richard Denning? Barbara Britton? Aren't you two married?" Denning replied that they were married, but not to each other. "Well!" the fan replied, "You certainly act like it" and left, seemingly disappointed.

== Episodes ==
Season	Episodes	First aired	Last aired	Network
1	39	October 3, 1952	June 26, 1953	CBS
2	18	January 26, 1954	May 25, 1954	NBC

== Production ==
The producers were William Collier Jr., Loveton, and Bernard L Schubert. Directors included Lew Landers, Paul Landres, George Blair, Daniels. and Ralph Murphy. Writers included Buckley Angell, Charles Belden, DeWitt Bodeen, Mortimer Brais, Adele Comandini, Reginald Denham, Leslie Edgley, Lee Erwin, Doris Gilbert, Hoffman Hays, John Meredyth Lucas, Donn Mullally, Mary Orr, and George Oppenheimer. Fifty-seven episodes were produced, 39 for the first season and 18 for the second. The cast had few rehearsals; most scenes were shot in one take in order to keep pace with the allocation of three days to complete each episode.

As of mid-July 1952, the network on which the program would be seen remained uncertain, as Colgate negotiated with networks for a favorable evening time slot. The trade publication Variety reported, "it appeared a tossup between CBS and ABC, with NBC unable to deliver a suitable time period".

Colgate sponsored Mr. and Mrs. North on CBS. Revlon and Congoleum-Nairn, Incorporated, were co-sponsors on NBC. Denning and Britton appeared in the show's commercials for Revlon. Colgate sponsored Mr. and Mrs. North on multiple local stations in markets in which clearance was not available on network affiliates. Mr. and Mrs. North was broadcast on CBS on Fridays from 10 to 10:30 p.m. Eastern Time. Episodes on NBC were seen on Tuesdays from 10:30 to 11 p.m. E. T. NBC encountered problems with its schedule because the 10:30-11 slot had been under local stations' control. Variety called that half-hour "the cream time period for local sales where rating is pre-guaranteed" and added, "There's still plenty of station resistance to giving up the half-hour."

== Critical response ==
A review of the premiere episode in The New York Times said that the Lockridges might not recognize the Norths as they were portrayed on TV. Jack Gould wrote, "There is none of the style and wit that distinguished the Lockridge characterizations and dialogue; in their stead are only trite and predictable situations peopled with stock figures lacking in dimension or unique appeal." He compared the broadcast to a B movie, typical of the season's programming.

John Lester wrote in The Sunday (Newark, New Jersey) Star-Ledger that the Norths "are always pleasant and likeable young people, frequently even delightful" with whom viewers could identify. He added that the title couple's appeal was enhanced by the colorful characters who appeared in episodes.

TV Guide reviewed the program after its format was revised, a change that the magazine said "improved the show considerably". The review said that more focus on mystery and less on farce resulted in "a more entertaining and suspenseful half hour". It added that the writing and production had improved, which enabled Denning and Britton to better display their acting abilities.

== Syndication ==
Reruns of Mr. and Mrs. North were initially distributed by Advertisers' TV Program Services, a company that Loveton created for that purpose. Schubert bought the series from Loveton in January 1956.
