= Mr. and Mrs. North (film) =

1942 film by Robert B. Sinclair

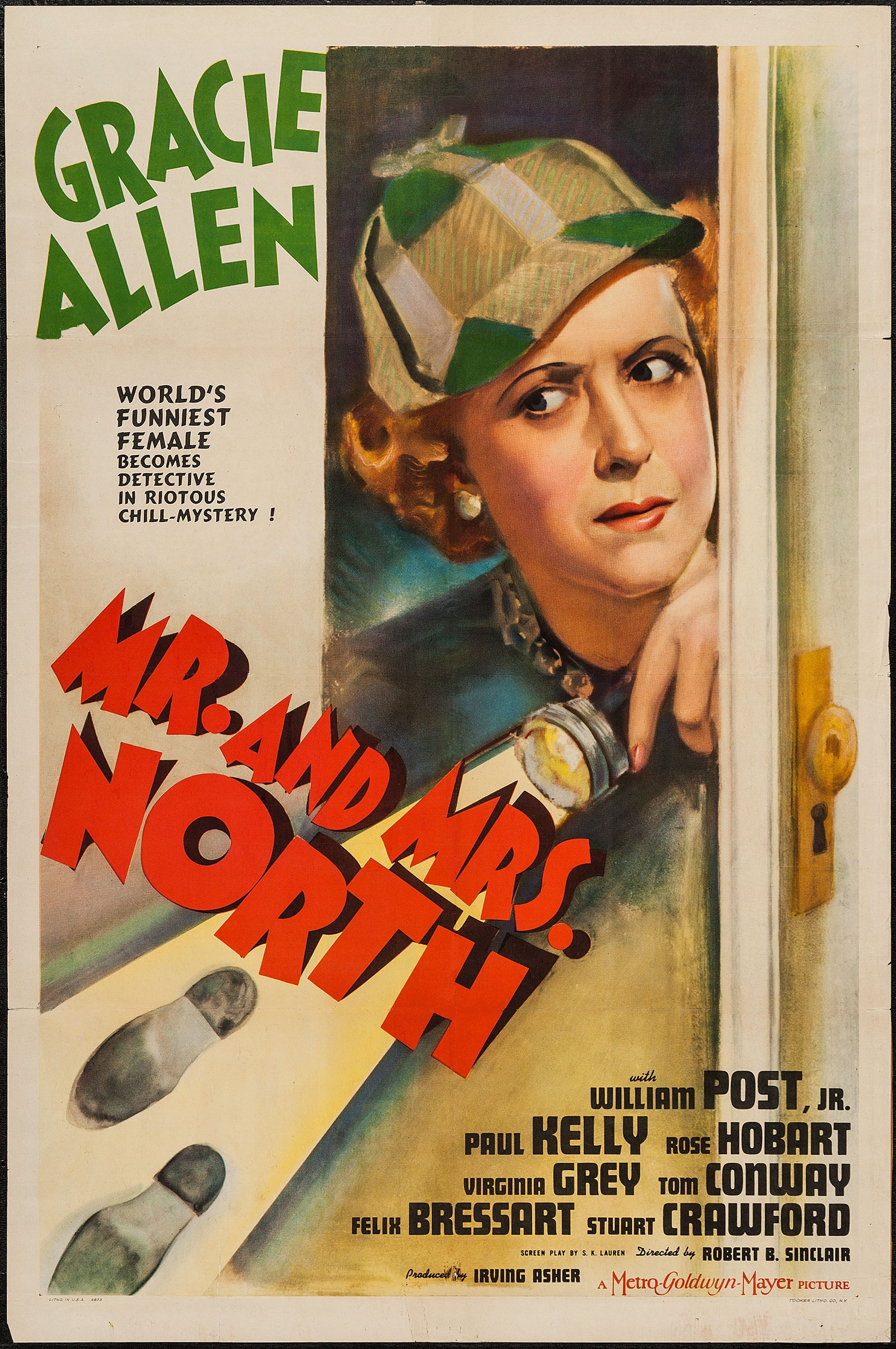
- Directed by: Robert B. Sinclair
- Written by: Richard Lockridge; Frances Lockridge
- Screenplay by: S. K. Lauren
- Based on: Mr. and Mrs. North; 1941 play by Owen Davis
- Produced by: Irving Asher
- Starring: Gracie Allen; William Post, Jr.; Paul Kelly; Rose Hobart; Virginia Grey; Tom Conway; Felix Bressart; Stuart Crawford
- Cinematography: Harry Stradling Sr.
- Edited by: Ralph E. Winters
- Music by: Daniele Amfitheatrof
- Production company: Metro-Goldwyn-Mayer
- Distributed by: Loew's
- Release date: January 23, 1942
- Running time: 67 minutes
- Country: United States
- Language: English

Mr. and Mrs. North is a 1942 American comedy mystery film directed by Robert B. Sinclair, starring Gracie Allen and William Post, Jr. as detectives Pam and Jerry North. The screenplay was based on a 1941 Broadway play by Owen Davis, which in turn was based on a series of mystery novels by Frances and Richard Lockridge. Pam North, a dizzy socialite, and her husband Jerry return home from a vacation to find a dead body in their apartment. All the suspects are close friends of the Norths, a fact that encourages Pam to gently interfere in the ongoing murder investigation conducted by Lt. Weigand (Paul Kelly).

== Plot ==
Jerry North and his wife Pam return home after a night away in a holiday spirit. The spirit soon vanishes when the body of a man falls out of their liquor closet. The corpse is identified as Stanley Brent, the estranged husband of Carol Brent, a friend of Pam's. As the clues are unearthed, it appears that some member of the North's social circle, who knew they would be away, gained entrance to their apartment, asked Brent to come there and murdered him. Pam tries to establish alibis for all of her friends, and in doing so inadvertently establishes who killed Brent.

== Cast ==
- Gracie Allen as Pamela 'Pam' North
- William Post Jr. as Gerald P. 'Gerry' North
- Paul Kelly as Det. Lieutenant Luke Weigand
- Rose Hobart as Carol Brent
- Virginia Grey as Jane Wilson
- Tom Conway as Louis Berex
- Felix Bressart as Arthur Talbot, Fowler Brush Salesman
- Stuart Crawford as Stuart 'Stu' Blanton
- Porter Hall as District Attorney George Heyler
- Millard Mitchell as Detective Mullins
- Lucien Littlefield as Mr. Barnes, the Postman
- Inez Cooper as Mabel Harris, Gerry's Secretary
- Keye Luke as Kumi, Blanton's Servant
- Jerome Cowan as Ben Wilson
- Fortunio Bonanova as Buano

== Production ==
The film was based on the 1941 play of the same name, which ran for 163 performances at the Belasco Theatre in New York. It featured Albert Hackett and Peggy Conklin in the title roles, as well as Millard Mitchell as Detective Mullins, a role he reprised for the film. The play itself was based on three short stories by Richard and Frances Lockridge that were featured in the New Yorker magazine in 1940. This production was Gracie Allen's first movie since The Gracie Allen Murder Case, which was released in 1939.

== Reception ==
The New York Times wrote: "[...] folks who are seeking entertainment with a bit of body to it may find this film rather thin pickings. Too much Grace for so little meat."
