= Colgate Theatre =

Colgate Theatre may refer to:

- Colgate Theatre (1949 TV series), an American live dramatic anthology television series broadcast on NBC from 1949 to 1950
- Colgate Theatre (1958 TV series), an American anthology television series consisting of unsold pilot episodes broadcast on NBC in 1958
