= List of conspiracy-thriller films and television series =

This is an incomplete list of conspiracy thriller films and TV series.

== Films ==
Name	Date	Description
Above the Law	1988	A Chicago vice unit cop stumbles on a CIA plot to finance black ops with crack cocaine
Absolute Power	1997	A master burglar (Clint Eastwood) goes on the run after witnessing the President murdering his mistress
Air America	1990	Pilots in Laos discover that they are patsies for a CIA heroin-smuggling plot
All the President's Men	1976	Two young reporters uncover the Watergate scandal
Angels and Demons	2009	A Harvard symbologist discovers an Illuminati plot to destroy the Roman Catholic Church
Antitrust	2001	A computer engineer who graduates from Stanford joins a Portland-based computer firm and uncovers the terrible truth of the company's operation
The Arrival	1996	Mysterious forces cover up an alien invasion
Arlington Road	1999	A former FBI agent, grieving for his deceased wife, suspects his next-door neighbors are terrorists
The Assassination Bureau	1969	An international anarchist organization performs political assassinations of the "socially undesirable" for pay
Blow Out	1981	A movie sound effects man goes on the run after recording the Chappaquiddick incident-style assassination of a prominent politician
Blue Thunder	1983	A helicopter pilot cop discovers that rogue military and government officials are plotting to use a high-tech police helicopter for sinister purposes
Bob Roberts	1991	Mockumentary; a right-wing politician, embroiled in the Iran–Contra affair, is the apparent target of an assassination
The Bourne Identity	2002	An amnesiac CIA assassin goes on the run from his superiors, who want to cover up their illegal activities
The Boys from Brazil	1978	Nazi fugitive Josef Mengele plots to use cloning to create the Fourth Reich
Branded	2012	Science Fiction: A marketing executive in a dystopian future discovers that ads are alien life forms feeding off humans.
Brass Target	1978	Rogue U.S. Army officers plot to assassinate General George S. Patton to cover up a massive theft of Nazi gold
Canadian Bacon	1995	Comedy; the President and his advisers seek to boost his approval rating by fabricating a cold war with Canada
Captain America: The Winter Soldier	2014	Superhero film; Captain America discovers that a terrorist organization has infiltrated the espionage agency he works for
Capricorn One	1978	The government fabricates the first crewed mission to Mars
Cars 2	2011	Tow Mater teams up with spies Finn McMissile and Holley Shiftwell to uncover a plot involving an organisation of Lemon terrorists sabotaging a World Grand Prix as part of a plan to discredit alternative fuel, including the promotion of a fuel called Allinol, which is gasoline engineered to blow up when in contact with an electromagnetic pulse
Charlie Wilson's War	2007	A Texas congressman illegally funnels money to the Afghan Mujahideen via a rogue CIA agent
The China Syndrome	1979	Management covers up safety flaws at a nuclear power plant; foreshadowed the Three Mile Island accident
Chinatown	1974	Film noir; a private eye stumbles onto murder and political corruption involving real estate interests in Southern California
The Circle	2017	A young woman gets a job at a prestigious tech/social media company, only to discover a conspiracy that will destroy privacy.
Coma	1978	A big hospital illegally harvests organs from comatose patients
Company Business	1991	Two former spies, one CIA and one KGB, go on the run in Berlin after stumbling onto a plot to trade drug money for hostages
Conspiracy Theory	1997	A conspiracy theorist cabbie (Mel Gibson) who falls in love with a lawyer (Julia Roberts) goes on the run after stumbling onto a real conspiracy involving brainwashing
Conspiracy	2001	Nazi officials during World War II become involved in the "Final Solution of the Jewish Question"
The Constant Gardener	2005	Big pharmaceutical companies pull the levers of power
The Conversation	1974	A paranoid surveillance expert Gene Hackman thinks he has overheard a murder plot and that he is being spied on
The Da Vinci Code	2006	A Harvard symbologist discovers a cover-up of the secret history of Christianity
The Dancer Upstairs	2002	Hunting terrorists in South America, a policeman encounters roadblocks in a corrupted state
Dark City	1998	An amnesiac awakes to discover that he is accused of murder, and that a mysterious group of men who possess the power to stop time and change reality are involved
The Day of the Jackal	1973	OAS leaders plot to assassinate President Charles de Gaulle
Death of a President	2006	Faux documentary; government officials cover up the truth of President Bush's assassination to push an anti-terrorism agenda
Defence of the Realm	1985	Two Reporters (Gabriel Byrne and Denholm Elliott) are investigating an MP's sex scandal stumbles onto a web of MI5 cover-ups involving murder and nuclear weapons
The Domino Principle	1977	A mysterious organization busts a Vietnam War vet out of prison for an assassination
Double Take	2001	Comedy; an innocent investment banker goes on the run from the CIA and a Mexican drug cartel after stumbling onto a money laundering scheme
Don't Worry Darling	2022	A young housewife discovers that life in the company town of "Victory, California" during the "1950s" isn't what it appears to be.
Eagle Eye	2008	Two people are guided by a mysterious and seemingly omnipotent female voice on their phones towards the result of wiping out most of the U.S. Presidential line of succession.
The Edge of Power	1987	When a journalist fabricates a story that a prominent right-wing Australian politician is a Nazi sympathizer and this hurts the government, a revenge plot to use the journalist as patsy in a political assassination is conceived.
Enemy of the State	1998	An attorney (Will Smith) goes on the run from rogue NSA operatives after he is passed a videotape of them assassinating a congressman
Eraser	1996	Rogue Pentagon officials sell high-tech arms under the table and eliminate the witnesses with the help of rogue U.S. Marshals
Executive Action	1973	A group of right-wing business magnates and mercenary covert ops specialists plot and carry out the John F. Kennedy assassination
Extreme Measures	1996	A secretive hospital attempts to cover-up medical experiments performed on the homeless
La Femme Nikita	1990	A convicted felon is given a new identity and trained as an assassin.
Fire Down Below	1997	An EPA agent battles and investigates a corrupt corporation in Kentucky that is dumping toxic waste in the state's abandoned mine which leads him to the death of his partner and best friend
The Firm	1993	A Harvard Law graduate (Tom Cruise) from Boston joins a firm in Memphis and discovers that the company murders its associates
Flightplan	2005	A woman's (Jodie Foster) daughter disappears without a trace aboard an airplane
Flashpoint	1984	Two Texas border-patrol men find a Jeep that has been buried for twenty years in the desert. It contains a skeleton, a scoped rifle, and a box with $800,000 in cash. They learn that the car is linked to the JFK assassination; rogue FBI agents attempt to cover-up the evidence
Foreign Correspondent	1940	Spies masquerading as leaders of a peace movement arrange a peace conference and a phony assassination to kidnap a diplomat
Foul Play	1978	Comedy; an innocent librarian Goldie Hawn stumbles onto a bizarre plot to assassinate the Pope
The Fourth Protocol	1987	A rogue KGB bent on prolonging the Cold War sends his top spy to detonate an atomic bomb at an American nuclear airbase in Great Britain
From Hell	2001	A psychic detective in Victorian era London investigates the Jack the Ripper killings and uncovers a Masonic plot
The Fugitive	1993	An innocent surgeon (Harrison Ford) is framed for his wife's murder and goes on the run to uncover the conspiracy
Futureworld	1976	A reporter Peter Fonda uncovers a conspiracy to replace the world's leaders with androids
The Game	1997	An unsuspecting investment banker is enrolled in a mysterious "game" as a birthday present and becomes the target of sinister forces, who may or may not want to ruin his life
The Ghost Writer	2010	A ghostwriter for the British Prime Minister investigates the mysterious death of his predecessor, which leads him to uncover the Prime Minister's secret history with the CIA
The Godfather Part III	1990	Rival Mafia factions compete to use the Vatican Bank for money laundering, leading to the assassination of a reformist Pope
Green Zone	2010	An Army Warrant Officer assigned to search for WMDs in war-torn Iraq stumbles into a civil war between the CIA and the DoD's Special Intelligence Unit over suspect intelligence
Ground Zero	1987	An Australian cameraman investigates the link between his father's death several years ago and the British nuclear tests at Maralinga during the 1960s. He discovers a secret which the government is prepared to kill to keep quiet.
Hidden Agenda	1990	A CID detective investigates the suspicious shooting of a human-rights lawyer in Belfast and discovers evidence of an RUC murder and a cover-up of a CIA/MI5 plot to destroy the governments of Harold Wilson and Edward Heath
Hoffa	1992	A union boss gets embroiled with the Mafia and politics and is eventually murdered
Hopscotch	1980	Comedy; a renegade CIA agent who threatens to write a memoir revealing decades of agency conspiracies is pursued by both the CIA and the KGB
Halloween III: Season of the Witch	1982	A small-town doctor discovers that an evil mask-making company owner is plotting to kill millions of American children on Halloween with something sinister inside Halloween masks
Hudson Hawk	1991	Comedy; a cat burglar is ensnared in an international conspiracy involving a maniacal billionaire, corrupt CIA agents, a Vatican secret society, and alchemy
I Witness	2003	A human rights investigator and an honest cop investigating the massacre of 23 campesinos in Mexico find links to drug cartels, dirty cops, and a multinational corporation embroiled in a union election
Illustrious Corpses	1976	An Italian cop investigating the assassinations of several judges finds that they are part of a neo-fascist "strategy of tension"
Impulse	1984	The government responds when a rural town is infected with toxic waste, causing violent and hyper-sexual behavior among the residents
Inception	2010	Science fiction; a team of corporate spies plan the ultimate heist: to plant an idea in another man's mind
The Incredibles	2004	Animation; When Mr. Incredible falls victim to a sinister conspiracy to eliminate superheroes, his family contrives to save him
The Insider	1999	Big tobacco seeks to cover up the health effects of tobacco and silence a whistleblower
The International	2009	An Interpol agent investigating a shadowy banking cartel discovers money laundering, political corruption, war profiteering, and assassination plots
The Interpreter	2005	A United Nations interpreter stumbles onto a plot to assassinate a controversial African head of state on the floor of the General Assembly
Interview with the Assassin	2002	Faux documentary; a critically ill ex-Marine sniper admits to his next-door neighbor that he assassinated President Kennedy
Invasion of the Body Snatchers	1956	Pod people subtly take over a small California town
Invasion of the Body Snatchers	1978	Pod people subtly take over San Francisco
In the Line of Fire	1993	A veteran Secret Service agent (Clint Eastwood) tries to stop a psychotic assassin (John Malkovich) from killing the President of the United States
The Ipcress File	1965	British agent Harry Palmer gets brainwashed to kill on command
Iron Man 3	2013	Superhero film; a government-backed think tank led by a mad scientist perpetrates false flag terror attacks and schemes to assassinate the President to install a puppet ruler and promote their illegal biotech
Jacob's Ladder	1990	The government performs chemical experiments on unwitting Vietnam soldiers
JFK	1991	The District attorney of New Orleans (Kevin Costner) investigates the Kennedy assassination and prosecutes a co-conspirator
Klute	1971	Film noir; a private eye investigates the disappearance of his friend and his connection to a call girl
The Last Boy Scout	1991	A private-eye and a football player discover that a team owner is planning to assassinate the U.S. Senator who is blocking legalized sports betting
Logan's Run	1976	In a dystopian future in which humans live hedonistic lives in a domed city, reproduction is controlled by computer and all humans are executed at age 30, for population control. Logan 5, an enforcer of early termination, struggles to escape his own fate.
The Long Kiss Goodnight	1996	An amnesiac housewife (Geena Davis) learns that she is actually a CIA assassin when her former colleagues come to eliminate her
The Man Who Knew Too Little	1997	Comedy; an innocent American tourist in England stumbles on a plot by the heads of MI6 and the KGB to bomb a treaty signing ceremony and reignite the Cold War
The Man Who Knew Too Much	1956	A team of rogue foreign spies kidnaps an American couple's son to silence them about a plot to assassinate an important dignitary
The Manchurian Candidate	1962	Communist spies use mind control for a political assassination
The Manchurian Candidate	2004	A multinational corporation uses mind control for a political assassination
Marathon Man	1976	An innocent grad student who finds his CIA-agent brother murdered is ensnared in an international Nazi money-laundering plot
The Matrix	1999	Science fiction; a hacker discovers that the world he inhabits is a virtual reality simulation controlled by sinister artificial intelligence
Men in Black	1997	Science Fiction Comedy; A secret organization covers up all alien activity on Earth, while trying to stop an intergalactic terrorist from assassinating two other intergalactic ambassadors.
Men in Black II	2002	Science Fiction Comedy; A man who works for a secret organization recruits his former partner and stops an Alien who disguises herself as a model, and plans to destroy Earth and other planets.
Men in Black III	2012	Science Fiction Comedy; A man who works for a secret organization must go back in time to 1969, and save his partner from being killed by an alien who is the last of its species.
Mercury Rising	1998	An NSA official sends assassins to kill an autistic nine-year-old who cracked a state-of-the-art encryption cipher.
Michael Clayton	2007	A "fixer" (George Clooney) for a New York City law firm uncovers a web of corruption and intrigue regarding a major client of his firm, an agrochemical corporation
Minority Report	2002	Science fiction; a cop who "solves" murders before they happen with the help of several "precogs" finds himself pursued for a crime-to-be, but he believes he is being set up
Ministry of Fear	1944	Film noir; a man, recently released from a mental hospital, wins a cake at a carnival and finds himself pursued by spies
Missing	1982	An American businessman searching for his "disappeared" son in a South American dictatorship finds evidence that the American government was involved.
Mission: Impossible	1996	A secret agent goes on the run when a traitor within his agency frames him for the murders of his team
Mission: Impossible – Rogue Nation	2015	A secret agent goes on the run to uncover the rogue espionage cartel behind a series of disasters and assassinations
Money Monster	2016	A Financial TV Host (George Clooney) and his producer (Julia Roberts) are put in an extreme situation when an angry investor (Jack O'Connell) takes them and their crew as hostage
Monsters Inc.	2001	Animation Comedy; in a city inhabited by monsters and powered by screams, two co-workers at an energy factory team up to uncover a plot by their boss and lizard-like co-worker involving kidnapping children and forcefully extracting screams to save the city from an energy crisis when they discover that kids are no longer becoming scared of monsters.
Most Wanted	1997	A former special forces officer goes on the run after being recruited into a secret assassination squad and framed for the murder of the First Lady.
Mulholland Falls	1996	An LAPD detective investigates his mistress's murder and follows the evidence to the Nevada Test Site.
Murder at 1600	1997	A Washington, D.C. detective (Wesley Snipes) investigates the murder of a White House intern inside the West Wing, and begins to suspect that a member of the First Family is the killer
Murder by Decree	1979	Sherlock Holmes (Christopher Plummer) investigates the Jack the Ripper killings and uncovers a Masonic plot
The Net	1995	A white-hat hacker (Sandra Bullock) stumbles onto a software company's machinations and goes on the run from cyberterrorists
The Negotiator	1998	An innocent African-American Chicago Police hostage negotiator (Samuel L. Jackson), framed for murder, embezzlement and police corruption, takes the city's police department hostage to uncover the conspiracy
Network	1976	A news network conspires with a revolutionary group to profit from their sensational acts of violence
The Nice Guys	2016	Comedy; an L.A. private eye and an enforcer team up to solve the case of a missing porn actress and the deaths of those involved in a certain porn film, leading to the discovery of a conspiracy involving Detroit auto manufacturers, Michigan politicians, and corrupt Department of Justice officials
Nick of Time	1996	An innocent accountant's daughter is kidnapped by mysterious operatives who demand that he assassinate the Governor of California
Nineteen Eighty-Four	1984	Winston Smith (John Hurt) is a low-ranking civil servant living in a perpetually war-torn London ruled by Oceania, a totalitarian superstate. Smith struggles to maintain his sanity and his grip on reality as the regime's overwhelming power and influence persecutes individualism and individual thinking on both a political and personal level.
Nixon	1995	Deals with the Watergate scandal and implies Nixon's Anthony Hopkins knowledge of a conspiracy to assassinate JFK
No Way Out	1987	An aide to the Secretary of Defense sleeps with the Secretary's mistress, who is subsequently murdered
North by Northwest	1959	An innocent advertising executive (Cary Grant) goes on the run after being mistaken for a spy by foreign operatives and finds that the CIA wants it that way
The November Man	2014	A retired CIA assassin is pitted against his former colleagues when he seeks to protect a witness to Russian political corruption
The ODESSA File	1974	A journalist tracking a Nazi war criminal's whereabouts discovers ODESSA's ratlines to Latin America
On Deadly Ground	1994	The corrupt owner of an oil company plots to use a new state-of-the art oil platform with sinister intentions that would endanger the people of Alaska and the Eskimos
The Package	1989	An American soldier stumbles onto an assassination plot by rogue American and Soviet military officials who wish to prevent the signing of a nuclear disarmament treaty
Panther	1995	The FBI seeks to destroy the Black Panther Party by any means necessary, while teaming up with Mafia to keep the blacks down by flooding the ghetto with cocaine and heroin
The Parallax View	1974	A journalist (Warren Beatty) re-investigates the assassination of a presidential candidate and discovers a mysterious organization that seemingly recruits assassins
The Peacemaker	1997	An Army colonel (George Clooney) and a civilian woman supervising him (Nicole Kidman) must try to locate stolen Russian nuclear weapons before they are used by terrorists
The Pelican Brief	1993	An innocent law student (Julia Roberts) aided by a newspaper reporter (Denzel Washington) goes on the run after writing a paper speculating that a billionaire had two Supreme Court justices assassinated to fix a lawsuit appeal
The President's Analyst	1967	Comedy; an innocent psychotherapist (James Coburn) becomes analyst to the president and goes on the run from operatives of every intelligence agency on Earth
Red Eye	2005	An innocent hotel manager (Rachel McAdams) is trapped aboard an airplane with a ruthless mercenary (Cillian Murphy) who threatens to kill her and her father unless she helps with a planned assassination
Salt	2010	A CIA agent (Angelina Jolie) is accused of being a mole by a Russian defector, and goes on the run to prove her innocence
The Secret	1974	A French fugitive takes refuge with a couple, claiming that he is being pursued by the authorities carrying out a cover-up
The Sentinel	2006	An innocent Secret Service agent is framed for plotting to assassinate the President of the United States and goes on the run to uncover the conspiracy
Serpico	1973	An honest cop (Al Pacino) works to expose police corruption in the NYPD
Seven Days in May	1964	An Army colonel discovers that rogue generals are plotting a coup d'état against the President
Shadow Conspiracy	1997	The White House Chief of Staff conspires to assassinate the President
Sherlock Holmes	2009	Sherlock Holmes investigates a series of killings perpetrated by a seemingly immortal occultist and discovers a plot to conquer the United Kingdom
Sherlock Holmes: A Game of Shadows	2011	Sherlock Holmes discovers that a series of bombings and assassinations, supposedly perpetrated by anarchists, are part of Professor Moriarty's plan to trigger a world war
Shooter	2007	An ex-U.S. Marine Scout Sniper is framed for the attempted assassination of the President of the United States and goes on the run to uncover the truth
Silkwood	1983	A whistle-blower at a nuclear plant is silenced
Silver City	2004	A journalist hired to investigate a dead body at a gubernatorial campaign event stumbles onto a web of corruption involving the election and a mysterious copper mine
The Skulls	2000	A college student is threatened after he discovers the sinister true nature of a prestigious campus secret society
Snake Eyes	1998	A corrupt Atlantic City police detective investigates when the Secretary of Defense is assassinated ringside at a championship boxing event
Sneakers	1992	A team of industrial espionage experts are recruited by NSA agents to steal a mysterious "black box," only to discover too late that their employers are not really with the NSA
Sorry to Bother You	2018	A young Black man rises through the ranks of a telemarketing business, discovering an odd corporate conspiracy in the process.
Soylent Green	1973	A detective (Charlton Heston) investigates a murder in a dystopian future beset by overpopulation, global warming, pollution, dying oceans, and poverty, while the populace sustains itself on a mysterious source of food called "soylent green"
The Spanish Prisoner	1997	An innocent chemist in possession of a lucrative secret formula is targeted by con men and framed for industrial espionage and murder
Star Trek VI: The Undiscovered Country	1991	Science fiction; rogue Federation and Klingon military officials attempt to assassinate the Klingon chancellor and Federation president to prevent the end of their cold war
The Stepford Wives	1975	A housewife suspects that the women of Stepford are being replaced by androids
The Stepford Wives	2004	A post-feminist executive suspects that the women of Stepford are being replaced by androids
The Star Chamber	1983	Disgusted with criminals using technicalities to escape justice, an idealistic young judge investigates an alternative method for punishing the guilty
The Stuff	1985	Comedy Horror; People discover that a yogurt-like white substance is a sentient organism that gradually takes over their brains that mutates when they eat it and turn into bizarre zombie-like creatures
Syriana	2005	A CIA agent, an energy analyst, and an antitrust lawyer are embroiled in a web of corruption and assassination involving U.S. intelligence and Big Oil
The Tailor of Panama	2001	A rogue MI6 operative fabricates a Panamanian revolutionary group and starts a war to line his own pockets
The Tall Blond Man with One Black Shoe	1972	Comedy; an innocent man is selected at random to be pursued by spies as part of a power struggle within French counter-intelligence
Tango & Cash	1989	Two rival Los Angeles cops, framed for murder, escape from prison to uncover the conspiracy
They Live	1988	Science fiction; an American drifter searching for employment discovers special sunglasses that reveal that reality is not what it seems
The Thirteenth Floor	1999	Science fiction; a computer scientist suspected of a colleague's murder stumbles into a world of virtual reality and body swapping
Three Days of the Condor	1975	After returning from lunch to find his coworkers murdered, a CIA researcher goes on the run from his own agency
Topaz	1969	A CIA agent stumbles on a high-level KGB spy ring with moles in every Western intelligence agency
Total Recall	1990	Science fiction; A construction worker goes on the run after recovering his memory on the planet Mars
Urban Wolf	2010	A tourist is stalked throughout Paris by a malevolent mass surveillance technician
U.S. Marshals	1998	A Diplomatic Security Service agent involved in covert ops is framed for murder and treason, and goes on the run to uncover the conspiracy
V for Vendetta	2006	A shadowy freedom fighter known only as "V" uses terrorist tactics to fight against his Totalitarian society
Valkyrie	2008	The July 20 Plot to assassinate Adolf Hitler and overthrow the Nazi Government
Vantage Point	2008	The attempted assassination of the President at an anti-terrorism treaty signing ceremony is more than meets the eye
Videodrome	1983	A sleazy TV executive James Woods discovers a conspiracy to control minds through a certain broadcast channel.
Wag the Dog	1997	Black comedy; when the President is embroiled in a sex scandal two weeks before the election, two government operatives (Robert De Niro and Anne Heche) and a film producer (Dustin Hoffman) fabricate a war with Albania to distract the public
Watchmen	2009	In an alternate history 1985, a group of superheroes investigate the murder of one of their own and end up uncovering a much larger conspiracy.
The Whistleblower	2010	While working as a peacekeeper for the U.N., a cop tries to expose an international human trafficking ring.
Who Killed Atlanta's Children?	2000	Journalists re-investigating the Atlanta child murders stumble on a government cover-up of Ku Klux Klan involvement
Winter Kills	1979	Black comedy; the brother of a slain president investigates his assassination
Wrong Is Right	1982	Black comedy; a journalist is embroiled in plot and counterplot involving the CIA, Islamic fundamentalists, a ruthless arms trafficker, and a tight presidential election
The X-Files	1998	FBI agents Mulder and Scully investigate the bombing of a federal building and stumble on evidence of a conspiracy between aliens and a shadow government
xXx: State of the Union	2005	The Secretary of Defense plots a coup d'état against the president
Z	1969	In an unnamed European country, a prominent opposition leader is assassinated by elements within the government
Zootopia	2016	Animation; in a city run by anthropomorphic animals, a rabbit police officer teams with a street hustler fox to investigate the disappearance of several citizens across the city and in the process uncovers a political conspiracy

== TV series and miniseries ==
=== 24 ===
In the television series 24, many seasons plot involved a vast conspiracy from the government. For example, in season 5, terrorist took Ontario airport terminal passenger in hostage to take possession of a deadly gas. CIA had put gas there for terrorist to take it and explode it while in transit in Middle-East, providing a reason for United States to send troops in Middle East. In season 8, President Taylor tried to cover up the Russian involvement in IRK president.

=== Burn Notice ===
A 2007 American TV series, airing on the USA Network, following the exploits of Michael Westen, a former covert operative for the American intelligence community who is stranded in his hometown of Miami after a burn notice is put out against him for reasons unknown. Although individual episodes of the series generally focus on Westen's work as an unlicensed private investigator and mercenary, the series' overall story arc involves his investigation of the reasons behind his burn notice and his discovery that he is a pawn in an international conspiracy.

=== Damages ===
A 2007 American TV series, airing on the FX cable television network, following the exploits of Ellen Parsons, a naive and idealistic young lawyer who goes to work for Patty Hewes, one of the nation's wealthiest litigators. Told in flashbacks, the series relates Ellen's involvement in Patty's cases against high-flying corporate fraudsters, the murder of her fiancée, and her discovery that Patty can be every bit as ruthless and cruel as her opponents.

=== Edge of Darkness ===
A 1985 British miniseries that ran for six episodes, following the exploits of Ronald Craven, a Yorkshire police officer who investigates the brutal murder of his environmentalist daughter and stumbles upon a web of corruption and deceit involving British and American intelligence agencies and revolving around the nuclear power industry.

=== Kidnapped ===
A 2006 American TV series that ran for one season of 13 episodes, following the investigation into the kidnapping of Leopold Cain, son of Wall Street billionaire Conrad Cain. Although the case at first appears to involve a simple ransom demand, after the senior Cain brings in a mysterious "retrieval expert" named Knapp and an FBI agent named Latimer King becomes involved, it soon develops that the crime is actually the work of an international conspiracy, and that the motive is vengeance on the Cains themselves.

=== Law & Order ===
An American TV series that combines elements of police procedural and legal drama, Law & Order has aired for 19 seasons since its debut in 1990, making it the longest running primetime drama on the television. Although not specifically a "conspiracy thriller" show, many episodes have focused on conspiracy theories taken in whole or in part from real-life news stories, as well as wholly original conspiracy plot lines. These include:

Title	Episode No.	Season	Description
"Everybody's Favorite Bagman"	06	01	A city councilman is found comatose after being stabbed in his car, and the investigation of what appears to be a simple mugging soon reveals a plot between high-ranking city officials, a Mafia crime family, and a deputy police commissioner (Ron Foster) to skim the city's parking meters. This episode was inspired by the suicide of Queens Borough President Donald Manes.
"The Troubles"	20	01	The murders of two federal prisoners – a Lebanese gunrunner and a Cuban drug smuggler – are linked to the Provisional Irish Republican Army and a renowned republican activist (Anthony Heald) who is fighting deportation.
"The Blue Wall"	22	01	Three bankers accused of money laundering are acquitted after the key computer evidence against them is deleted while in police custody, and the investigation implicates the detectives' captain (Dann Florek), his "rabbi" on the force (Robert Lansing), and a prominent Congressman (Pirie MacDonald).
"Severance"	35	02	Two men are gunned down in a parking lot, and evidence indicates that they are collateral damage in the disappearance of a witness slated to testify against an imprisoned millionaire (Jay Devlin).
"The Working Stiff"	44	02	The murder of a legendary corporate raider is thought to be the work of one of his outraged victims, until evidence surfaces of a complex plot involving bank fraud, union racketeers, and the former Governor of New York (William Prince).
"Conspiracy"	46	03	The assassination of a charismatic black nationalist (Harold Miller) is blamed on a white lone gunman (Jeff Gendelman), but direct evidence is scarce and his attorney (Eric Bogosian) claims he is the fall guy for a plot within the victim's organization. This episode, which won the 1993 Edgar Award for Best Television Episode, was inspired by conspiracy theories regarding the assassination of Malcolm X and the murder trial of El Sayyid Nosair.
"Blood Libel"	120	06	When an anti-semitic high schooler (Jackey Vinson) goes on trial for murdering a Jewish teacher who caught him buying grades, his Klan-affiliated lawyer (Chris Cooper) claims that he is a victim of a Jewish conspiracy.
"Entrapment"	143	07	The son (Chris McKinney) of an assassinated black nationalist is accused of attempting to kill the rival movement leader (Ron Cephas Jones) he believes ordered his father's murder, but his attorney (Samuel E. Wright) claims he was entrapped by his girlfriend (Michelle Hurd), who works as a paid informant for the FBI. This episode, inspired by the prosecution of Qubilah Shabazz, is the sequel to "Conspiracy".
"Ramparts"	192	09	A Volkswagen microbus containing the skeletal remains of a 1960s student radical is dredged out of the river, but the truth about the victim's identity and the circumstances of his death is buried within the files of the NYPD's infamous Red Squad, which the department refuses to unseal. This episode was inspired by revelations about COINTELPRO and Operation CHAOS.
"Sideshow"	195	09	The investigation of the staged suicide of a Social Security Administration bureaucrat from Baltimore leads to allegations of lesbian sexual harassment, a female contract killer (Delissa Reynolds), an imprisoned drug lord (Charles Malik Whitfield), and an address book containing the number of a White House cell phone, but a meddling Independent Counsel (George Hearn) threatens to derail the investigation. This episode, the first part of a two-part crossover with Homicide: Life on the Street, was inspired by Kenneth Starr's investigations into the Whitewater controversy, the Lewinsky scandal, and the suicide of Vince Foster.
"Empire"	201	09	An investment banker with a history of heart disease collapses and dies after being poisoned with sildenafil-spiked champagne, and the investigation implicates a professional fundraiser (Julia Roberts) and the legendary real estate developer (Daniel Hugh Kelly) whose bond credit rating the victim was threatening.
"Vaya Con Dios"	229	10	An old man is found dead at the bottom of an apartment building stairwell, and it is discovered that he had been investigating the forced disappearance and murder of his son in Chile shortly after the 1973 coup, in which he believed officials of the American government were involved. This episode was inspired by the investigation into the disappearance of Charles Horman.
"Burn Baby Burn"	235	11	A former Black Panther (Clarence Williams III), now a respected community organizer, is brought to trial for the murder of a white police officer, and his attorney (Joe Morton) claims that he was defending himself from an assassination attempt by a member of a racist police cabal. This episode was inspired by the murder trial of H. Rap Brown.
"Deep Vote"	253	11	A housewife is shot to death in her car, and detectives suspect that she was killed by a mob hitman (David Roya) who mistook her for a reporter (Kate Jennings Grant) investigating allegations that a crucial State Senate race was decided by electoral fraud.
"Soldier of Fortune"	257	12	Two bystanders are killed during the daylight kidnapping and murder of a diamond merchant perpetrated by a special forces officer (Lance Reddick) from Sierra Leone who claims to have acted under orders from his government, but prosecutors suspect the crime is the work of a shadowy diamond cartel looking to cover up its dealings in blood diamonds.
"Missing"	267	12	A young political aide (Anna Damergis) vanishes, and the investigation leads to her married boyfriend (Brian Kerwin), a powerful state gaming official, and his childhood friend (Timothy Wheeler), who is now a ruthless criminal. This episode was inspired by the disappearance of Chandra Levy.
"Embedded"	309	14	A sleazy reporter (Nick Chinlund), who was expelled from Iraq for divulging troop movements, is shot and wounded on a street corner, and the Army seems willing to stoop to any level to shield the prime suspect (Keith Nobbs) from prosecution. This episode was inspired by the controversy over Geraldo Rivera's reporting in Iraq.
"Coming Down Hard"	329	15	A rash of suicides on a local college campus exposes the sordid business practices of a pharmaceutical company, which has been covering up the terrible side-effects of its best-selling antidepressant.
"Enemy"	335	15	The massacre of seven people in a Manhattan crack house is linked to a drug-smuggling ring run by a notorious Afghani warlord (Christopher Maher), who claims that he is immune from prosecution because his acts were sanctioned by the government as part of the war on terrorism. This episode was inspired by journalist Gary Webb's allegations of a "dark alliance" between drug lords and the CIA during the Cold War.
"Publish and Perish"	346	15	A book editor (Randy Graff) with a history of anger management issues is arrested for the murder of her client, a famous porn star, but further investigation indicates she may have been framed by another client, a former police commissioner (Kevin Dunn) recently nominated to serve as Secretary of Homeland Security. This episode was inspired by the publication of Jenna Jameson's autobiography, a series of scandals at the Orange County Sheriff's Department, and corruption charges against former NYPD Commissioner Bernard Kerik.
"Kingmaker"	369	16	An undercover police officer is murdered, and it is revealed that her identity was leaked to the press by a ruthless political operative (Garret Dillahunt) in retaliation for her pundit father's (Sam Freed) attack on a liberal congressman (David Forsyth). This episode was inspired by the Plame affair.
"Profiteer"	377	17	The CEO of a body armor manufacturer is gunned down at his daughter's sweet sixteen party, and the investigation uncovers a plot to cover up the deliberate sale of faulty bulletproof vests to soldiers stationed in Iraq.
"Bottomless"	397	18	The prosecution of a murderer (Will Chase) who killed over a pair of pants is at first helped and then hindered by the security operatives of a multinational department store chain, which seeks to cover up its role in the distribution of toothpaste contaminated with antifreeze. This episode was inspired by the Pearson v. Chung lawsuit, by the 2007 Chinese export recalls, and by the several controversies over the Wal-Mart chain.
"Political Animal"	399	18	The investigation of a triple murder disguised as a murder-suicide leads to a closeted State Senator (John Doman) and a prominent businessman (John Ortiz) whose work as a top political fundraiser conceals his past as a con man and fugitive. This episode was inspired by the arrests of Norman Hsu and Senator Larry Craig.
"Bogeyman"	408	18	The shooting death of a young writer (Emily Dorsch) looks like suicide, but her husband (Daniel London) claims it is the work of a sinister cult with a reputation for harassing and spying on its critics. This episode was inspired by the numerous controversies related to the Church of Scientology.
"Excalibur"	411	18	The prosecution of an escort agency operator (Eric Sheffer Stevens) who murdered his brother-in-law (Ted Koch) is derailed when it is revealed that New York's youthful new Governor (Tom Everett Scott) is one of his clients, and willing to take any steps necessary to keep that information secret. This episode was inspired by the prostitution scandal that led to the resignation of Governor Eliot Spitzer.
"Knock Off"	416	19	A small-town sheriff (Clancy Brown), famous for his anti-drug exploits, is suspected of murdering a former informant (John Bianco) to cover up his involvement in illegal activities, but detectives discover that the only evidence against him has been destroyed by a member (Matt Walton) of a special squad of state troopers who answer only to the Governor (Tom Everett Scott). This episode continues the storyline begun in "Excalibur".
"The Drowned and the Saved"	433	19	An investigation into the stabbing death of the head (Tom Bloom) of a prominent charity leads to two dominatrices (Jodie Markell and Tanya Fischer), a private investigator (Luke Kirby), an ambitious city councilwoman (Susan Kelechi Watson), the Governor (Tom Everett Scott) and First Lady (Alison Elliott) of New York, and a plot to sell a vacant U.S. Senate seat. This episode, inspired by the corruption charges against Governor Rod Blagojevich, concludes the storyline begun in "Excalibur."

=== Law & Order: Criminal Intent ===
A 2001 spinoff of the original Law & Order, this series focuses more on elements of police procedural, with the elements of legal drama associated with other shows in the franchise often almost non-existent. Although not specifically a "conspiracy thriller" show, many episodes have focused on conspiracy theories taken in whole or in part from real-life news stories, as well as wholly original conspiracy plot lines. These include:

Title	Episode No.	Season	Description
"The Pardoner's Tale"	08	01	An investigative reporter (Matt Servitto) and his fiancée are gunned-down outside their favorite restaurant, and the attack is linked to a fugitive money launderer (Mark Zimmerman) and an alleged cash-for-pardons scheme involving the Governor of New York. This episode was inspired by the controversy over President Bill Clinton's pardon of fugitive financier Marc Rich.
"Semi-Professional"	15	01	A law clerk working for a prominent judge (Michael Murphy) is found dead in her employer's home, and the investigation leads to a contentious battle for an appellate court appointment.
"Tuxedo Hill"	22	01	A high-powered executive (Cindy Katz), found unconscious and amnesiac in her wrecked car, is first implicated in and then exonerated of her boyfriend's murder, and detectives suspect she is being manipulated by corrupt officials at her own company. This episode was inspired by the fall of Enron.
"Cold Comfort"	39	02	The daughter (Maureen Mueller) of a recently deceased U.S. Senator is murdered in a public restroom and the case leads detectives to a probate dispute, cryonics, and the family of a noted philanthropist (Josef Sommer).
"Mis-Labeled"	59	03	A salesman (Darren Goldstein) for a major pharmaceutical company who sold synthetic blood in the Far East is strangled, chopped in half, and stuffed into his own luggage, and the investigation into his death uncovers a plot to cover up an even more nauseating act of corporate greed.
"Proud Flesh"	102	05	The eldest son (Alex Draper) of a legendary media mogul (Malcolm McDowell) is the victim of what appears to be a latex fetish exercise gone wrong, and all evidence points towards his father's much younger new wife (Cindy Cheung). This episode was inspired by the family of Rupert Murdoch.
"Wasichu"	103	05	A Secret Service agent (Georgia Hatzis) is murdered in her home, and the investigation zeroes in on her lobbyist husband (David Alan Basche) and the corrupt congressman (Bruce McGill) whose favor he was illegally courting. This episode was inspired by the Jack Abramoff scandal.
"Albatross"	124	06	A prominent judge (Daren Kelly) is killed by sniper-fire while rehearsing a reenactment of the Burr–Hamilton duel with a notoriously corrupt businessman (Xander Berkeley) whose wife (Donna Murphy) is the leading candidate for Mayor of New York City, and detectives can't decide who was the real target. This episode was inspired by scandals related to Jeanine Pirro and her husband.
"30"	127	06	A journalist (Lee Tergesen), poisoned with slow-acting-but-deadly Polonium 210, aids in his own murder investigation, which leads to a cover-up of circumstances related to the controversial death of a young American schoolteacher (Anna Moore) in Israel. This episode was inspired by the Alexander Litvinenko poisoning and the death of Rachel Corrie.
"Smile"	136	07	A dentist (Adam Heller) is murdered in his office, exposing a plot between FDA officials and a major corporation to cover up the existence of counterfeit mouthwash containing antifreeze, but a whistleblower (Amy Acker) may have a sinister agenda of her own.
"Untethered"	142	07	When his delinquent nephew (Trevor Morgan) tells him that inmates are being murdered in the psychiatric ward of a prison overseen by a sadistic warden (Debra Monk), a detective (Vincent D'Onofrio) goes undercover without his superiors' knowledge to investigate and gets a closer look at the truth than he bargained for.
"Assassin"	147	07	A man is killed while attempting to assassinate an exiled Tamil politician (Indira Varma), a highly paid European hitman (Roberto Purvis) is photographed entering the country and then disappears, and evidence indicates that someone within the target's own inner circle is behind the plot. This episode was inspired by the assassination of Benazir Bhutto.
"Playing Dead"	156	08	A drug addict (Elan Moss-Bachrach) is gunned down in his apartment by an assailant who spares the life of his girlfriend (Betty Gilpin), the stepdaughter of a city councilman (Scott Cohen) whose ruthless mother (Kathy Baker) is maneuvering him toward Gracie Mansion.

=== Law & Order: Special Victims Unit ===
A 1999 spinoff of the original Law & Order, this series focuses on investigations into sex crimes and crimes against children and the elderly. Although not specifically a "conspiracy thriller" show, several episodes have focused on conspiracy theories taken in whole or in part from real-life news stories, as well as wholly original conspiracy plot lines. These include:

Title	Episode No.	Season	Description
"Wrong is Right"	23	02	A man is found shot to death and set on fire on the beach, and detectives discover that he was a rocket scientist whose history as a convicted child molester was mysteriously erased after he went to work for a major defense contractor.
"Paranoia"	36	02	A respected police sergeant (Khandi Alexander) is raped and nearly murdered while on patrol, and the investigation is stymied by two Internal Affairs detectives (Scott Sowers and Dominic Fumusa) who tamper with evidence, order witnesses to lie, and try to frame the victim for corruption.
"Perfect"	90	04	A young runaway is found dead of exposure and prolonged torture, and the investigation leads to a prominent doctor (Gale Harold) whose glitzy clinic specializing in anti-aging hormone therapy acts as a front for a cult that abducts and brainwashes girls to become test subjects for human cloning. This episode was inspired by the claims of the Raëlian Movement.
"Goliath"	139	06	A rash of rapes and murder-suicides committed by Operation Enduring Freedom veterans exposes a plot between a pharmaceutical company and officials at the Pentagon to cover up the horrific side-effects of an anti-malaria drug being tested on unwitting soldiers. This episode was inspired by the controversy over the drug Lariam.
"Storm"	149	07	When a teenager and her younger sister end up in the hospital, detectives learn that both girls were abducted from New Orleans after Hurricane Katrina along with a third sister who is still missing. Detectives were able to catch the kidnapper and recover the girl, but when he dies and the autopsy determines it was Anthrax, Benson puts everything on the line so that she can get the truth out because the government is trying to hide their experiments with biochemicals.
"Retro"	207	10	A physician (Martin Mull) is prosecuted when his alternative treatments, based on claims that AIDS is a hoax perpetrated by the medical establishment, lead to two deaths.
"Zebras"	224	10	A series of savage murders are thought to be the work of a schizophrenic conspiracy theorist (Nick Stahl), and after an error by a rookie CSU tech (Noel Fisher) sets him free, those involved in the case begin to die.
"Spooked"	230	11	The double murder of two Gulf Cartel members looks like a run-of-the mill drug hit, but when the detectives find their phones tapped, they learn that they have stumbled into a shadowy world of Cuban spies and crooked FBI agents.

=== Life ===
An American police procedural which ran for two seasons and 32 episodes. In it, LAPD officer Charlie Crews, recently exonerated after serving 12 years in prison for a crime he did not commit, is returned to the force and promoted to detective, as well as receiving a sizable settlement. Although individual episodes of the series generally focused on Crews using his unique experiences and Zen Buddhist outlook to solve individual and unrelated murders, the series' overall story arc revolved around his secret investigation of the murders for which he was convicted, and his discovery that they were the result of an intricate conspiracy involving police corruption and the missing multimillion-dollar haul from a violent bank robbery shootout.

=== Nowhere Man ===
The series explores the adventures of a photojournalist's efforts to uncover a conspiracy that has consumed his life. While at dinner in a restaurant, Thomas Veil (played by Bruce Greenwood) returns from the restroom to discover that no one knows who he is—including his wife. His entire life seems to have been erased. The only clue he possesses is the negative of a photo he took at a hanging conducted by American soldiers in South America.

=== Numb3rs ===
An American police procedural featuring the exploits of FBI special agent Don Eppes (Rob Morrow) and his brother, Professor Charlie Eppes (David Krumholtz), a mathematics prodigy who applies his knowledge to solving crimes. Although not specifically a "conspiracy thriller" show, several episodes have focused on fictional conspiracy theories. These include:

Title	Episode No.	Season	Description
"Structural Corruption"	04	01	An architectural student (James Immekus) plunges to his death in an apparent suicide, but Charlie believes he was murdered, and his investigation reveals that the victim had stumbled onto dangerous structural flaws in a new office building that is the symbol of its financier owner (David Hunt).
"Assassin"	18	02	A raid on the home of a small-time forger (Christian Clemenson) uncovers a coded message indicating that the infamous Operation Condor has been reactivated and a highly trained contract killer has been dispatched to America to eliminate a young Colombian exile (Jordi Vilasuso), the last living member of a once-powerful political family.
"Rampage"	34	02	A real estate broker (Al Espinosa) with no criminal record goes on a shooting spree in the FBI's office, and the agents soon discover that his actions were puppeteered by a South African mercenary (Robert O'Reilly) who is looking to cover up a much larger crime.
"Brutus"	47	03	Two men (David Zayas and Simon Rhee) carry out public assassinations of a California State Senator and a psychiatrist with expertise in operant conditioning and then commit or attempt suicide, exposing a connection to a CIA-funded behavior modification program intended to create sleeper agents, and evidence indicates a third assassin is waiting in the wings.
"Democracy"	55	03	An eccentric statistician (Kelli O'Hara) who believes that she has found a link between a series of seemingly random deaths is herself found murdered, and the investigation leads to a shady billionaire (William Sadler), some supposedly un-hackable electronic voting machines, and allegations of electoral fraud in a race for the Los Angeles County Board of Supervisors.
"The Janus List"	61	03	A legendary former MI6 cryptographer (Martin Jarvis) suffering from slow-acting thallium poisoning threatens to blow up a bridge and delivers a series of coded clues to the agents, leading them into the shadowy world of private intelligency agencies in search of a fabled master list of double agents and moles.
"Trust Metric"	62	04	FBI agent Colby Granger (Dylan Bruno), recently outed as a double agent for China, escapes from custody along with fellow spy Dwayne Carter (Shawn Hatosy), and the agents must wrestle with their emotions as they race to recapture them before their handler (Val Kilmer) can spirit them out of the country...or kill them to cover his tracks.
"In Security"	67	04	A woman (Jennifer Riker) living in the Witness Protection Program is murdered in her home and it at first looks like a simple case of revenge killing by the crime boss (Peter Onorati) she put away, until the agents discover that her assassin (Chandler Parker) is also a protected witness, assigned to the same U.S. Marshal (Erika Alexander) as the victim.
"Chinese Box"	71	04	A paranoid FBI consultant (Enrico Colantoni) who specializes in surveillance techniques shoots his handler (Clifton Powell) and takes David Sinclair (Alimi Ballard) hostage in an elevator, claiming that his employers have been spying on him for weeks...and evidence emerges that he may be right.
"Blowback"	82	05	Eight people are found massacred inside a coffeehouse, two of whom are revealed to be undercover LAPD detectives, and the investigation leads to a film producer (Jonathan Silverman) who admits one of the victims was blackmailing him and allegations of corruption within the LAPD's notorious Intelligence Division.
"Conspiracy Theory"	88	05	A controversial charity composed entirely of billionaires is the target of a bombing, and the initial suspect is a conspiracy theorist (Josh Gad) who believes the group is a front for the New World Order, and who soon becomes the target of assassins looking to recover video he took of the charity's board meeting prior to the bombing.
"Hydra"	107	06	A mother (Taylor Stanley) with a history of mental health problems abducts her young daughter, and what at first seems to be a simple case of custodial interference soon proves more complicated when evidence indicates that the father (Christian Camargo), a prominent geneticist, is working on a human cloning project for a powerful and shady biotechnology firm.
"Dreamland"	108	06	Five employees of a high-tech defense contractor are killed by inexplicable bolts of energy from the sky at an allegedly abandoned Air Force base believed by conspiracy theorists to be "the new Area 51," and the team's investigation is joined by a mysterious and highly eccentric agent (John Michael Higgins) from the Pentagon.

=== Prison Break ===
An American TV series, which ran for four seasons and 81 episodes from 2005 to 2009. In it, structural engineer Michael Scofield infiltrates the prison in which his brother, Lincoln Burrows, has been unjustly imprisoned for the murder of the Vice President's brother, a murder he did not commit. Eventually, the two successfully escape along with several other inmates and learn that Lincoln's framing was the work of a shadowy consortium of conspirators called "The Company". The two spend the rest of the series combatting the Company's machinations.

The series was temporarily rebooted for a mini event series (season 5) that aired from 4/04/17-5/30/17, containing 9 episodes, picked up where the original series left off, with one last escape. But this time it's not only escaping from prison, the gang has to escape an entire country with many people hunting them down. Lincoln Burrows hears rumors of his thought to be dead brother, Michael Scofield, might just be alive but living by a different name altogether (Kaniel Outis).

=== The Prisoner ===
A British TV series, which ran for one season of 17 episodes from 1967 to 1968. In it, a British secret agent who has recently resigned his position is abducted by unknown forces and taken to a mysterious, idyllic village in an undisclosed location, which is seemingly populated entirely by other former agents of various international intelligence agencies. There, he is designated "Number Six", and a succession of interrogators, known collectively as "Number Two", attempt to extract the reason for his resignation from him via a variety of methods, including 24-hour surveillance, torture, double agents, mind control, hallucinogens, hypnosis, gaslighting, and a series of elaborate confidence tricks.

=== A Very British Coup ===
A 1988 British miniseries, based on a novel of the same name by future Member of Parliament Chris Mullin. The series concerns the events following the election of an avowedly socialist Labour Party leader as Prime Minister of the United Kingdom on a platform of unilateral nuclear disarmament, withdrawal from NATO, nationalization of major industries, and other policies unacceptable to the power elite. Following his assumption of office, a conspiracy is hatched that includes high-ranking officials of MI5 and MI6, the CIA, and wealthy business moguls, who plot to bring down the Government through subterfuge, rather than violence.

== See also ==
- Conspiracy fiction
- Assassinations in fiction
