= List of Mr. and Mrs. North episodes =

This is a list of episodes for the television series Mr. and Mrs. North.

== Series overview ==
Season	Episodes	First aired	Last aired	Network
1	39	October 3, 1952	June 26, 1953	CBS
2	18	January 26, 1954	May 25, 1954	NBC

== Episodes ==
=== Season 1 (1952–53) ===
No. overall	No. in season	Title	Directed by	Written by	Original release date
1	1	"Weekend Murder"	Ralph Murphy	DeWitt Bodeen	October 3, 1952
2	2	"Till Death Do Us Part"	Ralph Murphy	Robert Sloane	October 10, 1952
3	3	"A Good Buy"	Ralph Murphy	Reginald Denham, Mary Orr	October 17, 1952
4	4	"Death in the Dunes"	unknown	unknown	October 24, 1952
5	5	"These Latins"	Ralph Murphy	Hoffman Hays	October 31, 1952
6	6	"Nosed Out"	Ralph Murphy	Reginald Denham, Mary Orr	November 7, 1952
7	7	"The Forgotten Grave"	Lew Landers	unknown	November 14, 1952
8	8	"Dead Man's Tale"	Ralph Murphy	Tom Reed	November 21, 1952
9	9	"Surprise"	Ralph Murphy	George Oppenheimer, Barry Trivers	November 28, 1952
10	10	"Comic-Strip Tease"	Ralph Murphy	George Oppenheimer, Barry Trivers	December 5, 1952
11	11	"Where There's a Will"	Ralph Murphy	M. Coates Webster	December 12, 1952
12	12	"The Nobles"	Ralph Murphy	DeWitt Bodeen	December 19, 1952
13	13	"Silent Butler"	Ralph Murphy	George Oppenheimer, Barry Trivers	December 26, 1952
14	14	"On the Rocks"	Ralph Murphy	George Oppenheimer, Barry Trivers	January 2, 1953
15	15	"Formula for Trouble"	Ralph Murphy	Leslie Edgley	January 9, 1953
16	16	"House Behind the Wall"	Ralph Murphy	Adele Comandini	January 16, 1953
17	17	"Beauty Prize"	Ralph Murphy	DeWitt Bodeen	January 23, 1953
18	18	"The Third Eye"	Ralph Murphy	Barry Trivers	January 30, 1953
19	19	"The Doll House"	Ralph Murphy	Tom Reed	February 6, 1953
20	20	"Terror"	Ralph Murphy	Tom Reed	February 13, 1953
21	21	"Stranger Than Fiction"	Ralph Murphy	unknown	February 20, 1953
22	22	"The Frightened Bride"	Ralph Murphy	M. Coates Webster	February 27, 1953
23	23	"Murder in Short Pants"	Ralph Murphy	unknown	March 6, 1953
24	24	"Dying to Live"	Ralph Murphy	John Meredyth Lucas	March 13, 1953
25	25	"Blackout"	Ralph Murphy	unknown	March 20, 1953
26	26	"Jade Dragon"	Ralph Murphy	unknown	March 27, 1953
27	27	"Pretty Baby"	Ralph Murphy	M. Coates Webster	April 3, 1953
28	28	"The Man Who Came to Murder"	Ralph Murphy	Reginald Denham, Mary Orr	April 10, 1953
29	29	"Breakout"	Ralph Murphy	Herbert Purdom	April 17, 1953
30	30	"Maternity, Third Floor"	Ralph Murphy	John Meredyth Lucas	April 24, 1953
31	31	"Hot Mink"	Ralph Murphy	John Meredyth Lucas	May 1, 1953
32	32	"Seven Sacred Rubies"	unknown	unknown	May 8, 1953
33	33	"Shock"	unknown	unknown	May 15, 1953
34	34	"Busy Signal"	Ralph Murphy	Warren Wilson	May 22, 1953
35	35	"Salt in His Blood"	Ralph Murphy	Herbert Purdom	May 29, 1953
36	36	"Two Faced"	Ralph Murphy	Buckley Angell	June 5, 1953
37	37	"Trained for Murder"	Ralph Murphy	Erna Lazarus	June 12, 1953
38	38	"Murder on the Midway"	Ralph Murphy	Buckley Angell	June 19, 1953
39	39	"Million Dollar Coffin"	Ralph Murphy	Warren Wilson	June 26, 1953

=== Season 2 (1954) ===
No. overall	No. in season	Title	Directed by	Written by	Original release date
40	1	"Quick and the Deadly"	Paul Landres	Lee Erwin, Donn Mullally	January 26, 1954
41	2	"Target"	Paul Landres	Lee Erwin, Donn Mullally	February 2, 1954
42	3	"Reunion"	George Blair	Lee Erwin, Donn Mullally	February 9, 1954
43	4	"Loon Lake"	Lew Landers	Lee Erwin	February 16, 1954
44	5	"Hand Painted Murder"	Lew Landers	unknown	February 23, 1954
45	6	"The Ungrateful Killer"	Paul Landres	Herbert Purdom	March 2, 1954
46	7	"Flight 217"	Lew Landers	Charles Belden	March 9, 1954
47	8	"Death Doll"	Paul Landres	Lee Erwin	March 16, 1954
48	9	"Phantom at the Wedding"	Paul Landres	Erna Lazarus	March 23, 1954
49	10	"Homicide Limited"	Paul Landres	Lee Erwin, Donn Mullally	March 30, 1954
50	11	"Shrinking Violet"	Lew Landers	Doris Gilbert	April 6, 1954
51	12	"Model for Murder"	Paul Landres	Herbert Purdom	April 13, 1954
52	13	"Murder for Sale"	Lew Landers	Lee Erwin	April 20, 1954
53	14	"The Placid Affair"	Lew Landers	Mortimer Braus	April 27, 1954
54	15	"The Girl in Cell 13"	Lew Landers	Doris Gilbert	May 4, 1954
55	16	"The Suspected"	Paul Landres	Lee Erwin, Donn Mullally	May 11, 1954
56	17	"Mask of Hate"	Lew Landers	Lee Erwin	May 18, 1954
57	18	"Climax"	Lew Landers	Herbert Purdom	May 25, 1954
