= William Post Jr. =

American actor (1901–1989)

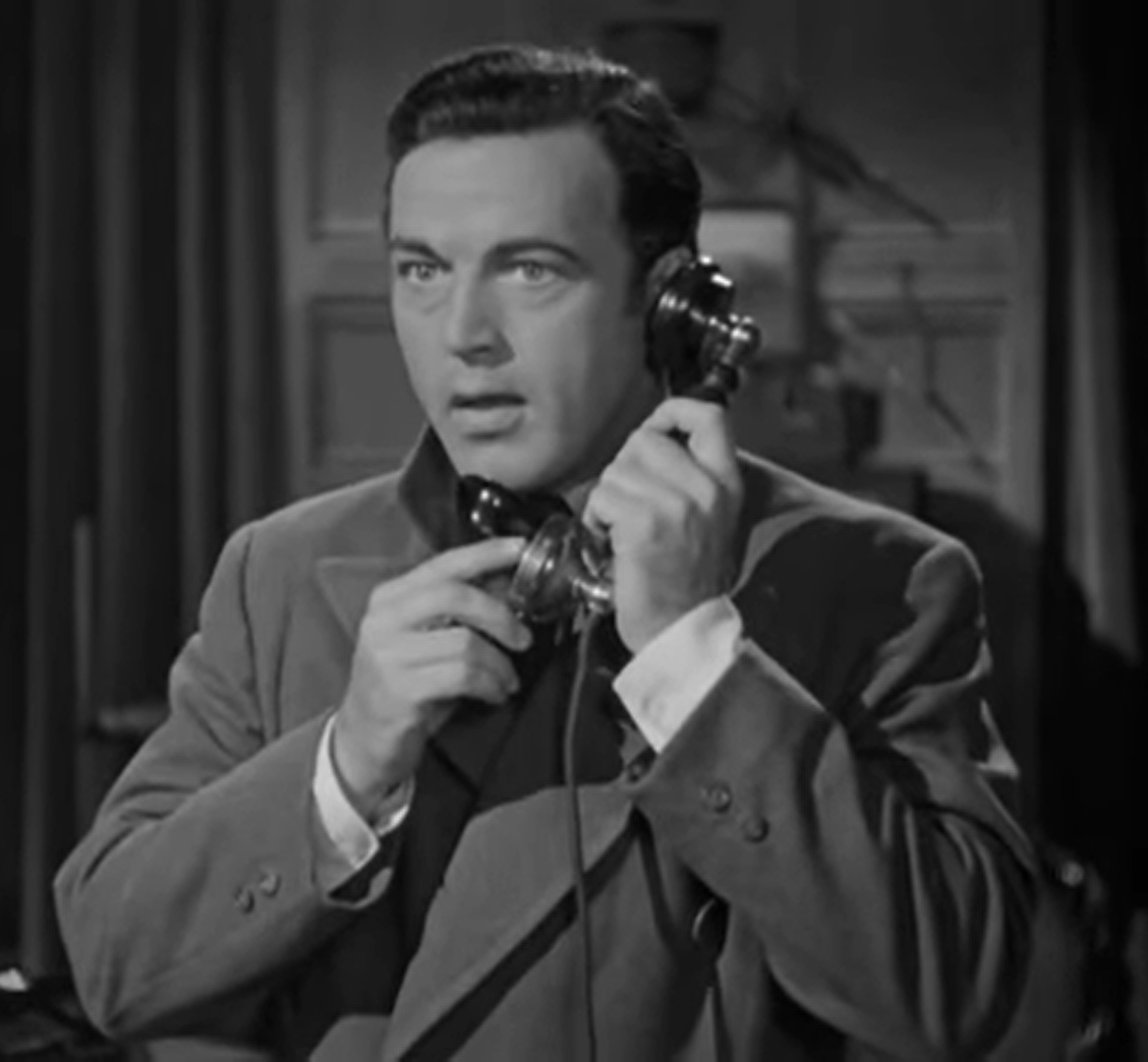
- Post in Sherlock Holmes and the Secret Weapon (1942)
- Born: February 19, 1901; Montclair, New Jersey, U.S.
- Died: September 26, 1989 (aged 88); Oklahoma City, Oklahoma, U.S.
- Education: Yale University
- Occupation: Actor
- Years active: 1931–1976
- Spouse(s): Joan Castle (m. 1941; div. 1944); Doris Broiles (m. ? – 1989)

William Post Jr. (February 19, 1901 – September 26, 1989) was an American actor and drama instructor. He was sometimes billed without the use of "Jr." following his surname.

== Early life ==
Post was born February 19, 1901, in Montclair, New Jersey. He was educated at the Phillips-Exeter Academy and Yale University. After graduating from Yale, he studied acting at the American Laboratory Theatre.

== Career ==
In the 1930s and 1940s, Post appeared in motion pictures and Broadway productions in supporting roles of varied prominence, but was notable as one of the six actors to portray the character of John Perry on the radio soap opera, John's Other Wife.

His acting career from the early 1950s onward, however, was spent exclusively and extensively in television. He portrayed Harry Henderson on the TV version of Beulah and Harley Naughton on the TV version of Claudia. On March 6, 1949, he had the title role in a Studio One production of Julius Caesar. His appearances on Broadway Television Theatre included productions of "The Night Cap", "The Fortune Hunter", "Three Cornered Moon". "The Letter", "The Enchanged Cottage", "Smilin' Through", and "Reflected Glory".

On Broadway, Post appeared in Richard III (1953), Love Goes to Press (1947), Calico Wedding (1945), My Sister Eileen (1940), Boyd's Daughter (1940), Madame Capet (1938), The Merry Wives of Windsor (1938), Many Mansions (1937), King Richard II (1937), Three Wise Fools (1936), A Touch of Brimstone (1935), The Eldest (1935), Strangers at Home (1934), Ah, Wilderness! (1933), When the Bough Breaks (1932), A Glass of Water (1930), Seventh Heaven (1922), and Thank You (1921).

Post additionally served for 25 years as the head of the drama department at Finch College, a women's college in Manhattan.

== Personal life ==
On September 11, 1941, Post married actress Joan Castle. He married his second wife, Doris Broiles, in ?

== Death ==
A resident of Granite, Oklahoma, in his later years, Post died at the age of 88 at the Presbyterian Hospital in Oklahoma City of chronic obstructive pulmonary disease. He was survived by his second wife, Doris Broiles [1917–1997], and his brother, Robert.

== Selected filmography ==
=== Film ===
- The Black Camel (1931) – Alan Jaynes
- Secret Service (1931) – Lieutenant Henry Dumont
- Birth of a Baby (1938) – John Burgess
- Babes on Broadway (1941) – Announcer
- Mr. and Mrs. North (1942) – Gerald P. North
- Ship Ahoy (1942) – H. U. Bennet
- Pacific Rendezvous (1942) – Lanny
- Sherlock Holmes and the Secret Weapon (1942) – Dr. Franz Tobel
- The Moon is Down (1943) – Alex Morden
- Roger Touhy, Gangster (1944) – Joseph P. Sutton
- Bride by Mistake (1944) – Donald
- Experiment Perilous (1944) – District Attorney
- The House on 92nd Street (1945) – Walker

=== Television ===
- The Borden Show (1947); 1 ep. "The Dangerous Man"
- Studio One in Hollywood (1947); 1 ep. "Julius Caesar" – Julius Caesar
- NBC Presents (1949); 1 ep. "My Wife is a Liar"
- The Clock (1949); 1 ep. "Mark Wade, D.A."
- Lights Out (1951); 1 ep. "Promise"
- The Philco Television Playhouse (1949); 3 eps. "The Queen Bee," "For Love or Money," "Romeo and Juliet" – Capulet
- Colgate Theatre (1950); 3 eps. "South Wind," "Blackmail," "Two for a Penny"
- The Chevrolet Tele-Theatre (1950); 1 ep. "The Brave Man with a Cord"
- Masterpiece Playhouse (1950); 1 ep. "Richard III"
- Cameo Theatre (1950); 1 ep. "A Point of View"
- Robert Montgomery Presents (1950); 1 ep. "The Letter" – Geoffrey Hammond
- The Philco Television Playhouse (1951); 1 ep. "Parnassus on Wheels"
- Lights Out (1951); 1 ep. "Dead Man's Coat" – Francis
- Hallmark Hall of Fame (1952); 1 ep. "Prelude" – Roberts
- Line of Duty (1952); TV Movie
- Broadway Television Theatre (1952); 2 eps. "Three Cornered Moon" – Dr. Alan Stevens, "The Fortune Hunter" – Charles Trowbridge
- Beulah (1950–1952); Recurring role in 6 eps. – Harry Henderson
- Robert Montgomery Presents (1953); 1 ep. "Appointment in Samarra"
- Broadway Television Theatre (1954); 1 ep. "Reflected Glory"
- The Edge of Night (1964) – Mr. Hull
- West Point (1957); 1 ep. "Ambush"
- Harbormaster (1958); 1 ep. "Experiment with a Traitor" – Commander Gilmer
- Armstrong Circle Theatre (1958); 2 eps. "Twelve Cases of Murder," "Thirty Days to Reconsider" – Stephen James
- Young Dr. Malone (1961–1963); Recurring role – Harold Cranston
- Sunday Showcase (1959); Role in two-part episode "What Makes Sammy Run?" – Lucky Westover
- Miracle on 34th Street (1959); TV Movie – Mr. Gimbel
- Armstrong Circle Theatre (1959); 1 ep. "The Jailbreak"
- Naked City (1960); 1 ep. "A Succession of Heartbeats" – Meredith Linus
- Everglades! (1962); 1 ep. "Hideout" – Dan Erickson
- Armstrong Circle Theatre (1962); 1 ep. "Journey to Oblivion" – Nick Logan
- Route 66 (1963); 1 ep. "Where Are the Sounds of Celli Brahms?" – Mr. Savel
- Love Is a Many Splendored Thing (1968–1971); Recurring role – Chandler Garrison #2
- You Are There (1971); 1 ep. "The Mystery of Amelia Earhart" – Putnam
- Where the Heart Is (1971–1973); Recurring role – Dr. Joe Prescott
- The Edge of Night (1974–1975); Recurring role – Walter LePage
- First Ladies Diaries: Edith Wilson (1976); TV movie – Senator Hitchcock
