= Colgate Theatre (1949 TV series) =

American anthology TV series in 1949 and 1958

- Genre: Live dramatic anthology series
- Country of origin: United States
- Original language: English
- No. of seasons: 2

Production
- Running time: 30 minutes

Original release
- Network: NBC
- Release: January 3, 1949 – June 25, 1950

Colgate Theatre is a 30-minute dramatic television anthology series telecast on NBC from January 3, 1949, to June 25, 1950.

The series is unrelated to NBC's 1958 series of the same name.

== Production and content ==
Colgate Theatre was a live television anthology series. Its episodes included a variety of comedies, dramas, and mysteries. Some were based on short stories, plays, or radio shows — the first season included the first television adaptations of the radio shows Mr. and Mrs. North and Vic and Sade — while others used scripts specifically written for television. Although top names usually did not appear on Colgate Theatre, casts included a wide variety of actors and actresses. Each episode began with a "Broadway Theater" theme playing while cameras showed the audience members take their seats in the theater, look through the program for the episode's title, and then focus their attention on the stage as the curtain rose.

== Broadcast history ==
Colgate Theatre premiered on January 3, 1949, and was telecast from 9:00 to 9:30 p.m. Eastern Time on Monday nights from then through September 1949. On October 2, 1949 it moved to Sunday nights, airing from 8:30 p.m. to 9:00 p.m. Eastern Time from October 1949 to June 1950. It last episode was broadcast on June 25, 1950. It was replaced by Vic and Sade beginning on July 11, 1949.

== Critical reception ==
A review in the trade publication Variety described the presentation of "The Haunting Years" on January 10, 1949, as being "completely devoid of quality". It said that the episode "was supposed to be a gag of cosmic proportions but it turned out to be only a kindergarten romp," adding that all involved in the production were "victimized by the script."

== Notable stars ==
- Mary Wickes

== Episodes ==
=== Season 1 (1949) ===
No.	Title	Directed by	Written by	Original release date
1	"Fancy Meeting You Here"	Unknown	Unknown	January 3, 1949
2	"The Haunting Year"	Unknown	Unknown	January 10, 1949
?	"Mr. and Mrs. North"	Unknown	Unknown	July 4, 1949
?	"Vic and Sade (Part 1)"	Unknown	Unknown	July 11, 1949
?	"Vic and Sade (Part 2)"	Unknown	Unknown	July 18, 1949
?	"Vic and Sade (Part 3)"	Unknown	Unknown	July 25, 1949
?	"The Key in the Lock"	Unknown	Unknown	August 15, 1949
Starring Rory Mallinson, Nancy Coleman, Jesse White, John Marley, and Julius Bing.
?	"What Price Story"	Unknown	Unknown	August 22, 1949
Starring William Post, Jr., Mary K. Wells, Reed Brown, Jr., Tony Rivers, and Dort Clark.
?	"Old Flame"	Unknown	Unknown	August 29, 1949
Starring Donald Buka, Sally Moffat, and John Boruff.
?	"My Wife Is a Liar"	Unknown	Unknown	September 5, 1949
Starring Erin O'Brien-Moore, William Post, Jr., Hunter Gardner, Frank Thomas, Jr., John Marley, David Orrick, and John Shay.
?	"The Loan"	Unknown	Unknown	September 19, 1949
Starring Tom Ewell, Harry Bannister, Billy Lynn, Fay Sappington, and Norma Jean Marlowe.

=== Season 2 (1949–1950) ===
No.	Title	Directed by	Written by	Original release date
1	"The Queen Bee"	Unknown	Unknown	October 2, 1949
Starring Claire Luce.
2	"Something's Got to Give"	Unknown	Unknown	October 9, 1949
Starring John Beal and Haila Stoddard.
3	"Retaliation"	Unknown	Unknown	October 16, 1949
4	"Young Stacey"	Unknown	Unknown	October 23, 1949
Starring Jane Marlowe.
5	"The Old Lady Shows Her Medals"	Melville Burke	J. M. Barrie	October 30, 1949
Starring Florence Reed.
6	"Remember the Day"	Unknown	Unknown	November 6, 1949
Starring Donald Rose.
7	"O'Brien"	Unknown	Unknown	November 13, 1949
Starring Phil Arthur and Jean Pugsley.
8	"News Item"	Unknown	Unknown	November 20, 1949
Starring James Engler and Mary Alice Moore.
9	"Daughters Are Different"	Unknown	Unknown	November 27, 1949
Starring Marta Linden, Dean Harens, Wendy Drew, and Mary K. Welles.
10	"Company for Dinner"	Unknown	Unknown	December 4, 1949
Starring Dorrit Kelton, John Baragrey, Mary K. Welles, and Harry Bannister.
11	"A Trip to Czardis"	Unknown	Unknown	December 11, 1949
Starring Butch Cavell and Norma Jane Marlowe.
12	"The Pearls"	Unknown	Unknown	December 18, 1949
Starring Renold Evans and Donald Buka.
13	"Blessed Are They"	Unknown	Unknown	December 25, 1949
Starring Ian Keith and Norma Jane Marlowe.
14	"I'll Marry You Later"	Unknown	Unknown	January 1, 1950
Starring Walter Klavan and Robert Gonay.
15	"Second Generation"	Unknown	Unknown	January 8, 1950
Starring Carroll Ashburn and Neva Patterson.
16	"Bert's Wedding"	Unknown	Unknown	January 15, 1950
Starring Parker Fennelly, Wendy Drew, and Frank Thomas, Jr.
17	"Two for a Penny"	Unknown	Unknown	January 22, 1950
Starring Neva Patterson and William Post, Jr.
18	"Abby, Her Farm"	Unknown	Unknown	January 29, 1950
Starring Jimsey Somers, Joan Castle, John Newland, and Jack Diamond.
19	"The Trap"	Unknown	Unknown	February 5, 1950
Starring Oliver Thorndyke and Mary K. Welles.
20	"The Brave and the Early Fallen"	Unknown	Unknown	February 12, 1950
Starring Royal Dano.
21	"The Karpoldi Letter"	Unknown	Unknown	February 19, 1950
Starring William Neil.
22	"The Long, Young Dreams"	Unknown	Unknown	February 26, 1950
Starring Faye Emerson and Barry Nelson.
23	"Neither a Borrower"	Unknown	Unknown	March 5, 1950
Starring Leona Maricle and Perry Wilson.
24	"Always a Knife in the Back"	Unknown	Unknown	March 12, 1950
Starring Vicki Cummings.
25	"Blackmail"	Unknown	Unknown	March 19, 1950
Starring William Post, Jr., Virginia Gilmore, and Cynthia Carlin.
26	"The Green Bush"	Unknown	Unknown	March 26, 1950
Starring Robert Feyti, Eleanor Lynn, and Jonathan Marlowe.
27	"Burden of Guilt"	Unknown	Unknown	April 2, 1950
Starring Clay Clement.
28	"Motive for Murder"	Unknown	Unknown	April 9, 1950
Starring John Baragrey and Pam Duncan.
29	"Double Entry"	Unknown	Unknown	April 16, 1950
Starring Florence Reed and Robert Feyti.
30	"The Witness to the Crime"	Unknown	Unknown	April 23, 1950
Starring Joe Glendenning, June Dayton, and Frank M. Thomas.
31	"The Lawbeaters"	Unknown	Unknown	April 30, 1950
Starring Lee Tracy.
32	"The Suitable Present"	Unknown	Unknown	May 7, 1950
Starring Kathleen Comegys.
33	"Revenge by Proxy"	Unknown	Unknown	May 14, 1950
Starring Nancy Coleman, Phil Arthur, Bernard Kates, and Victor Sutherland.
34	"Change of Murder"	Unknown	Unknown	May 21, 1950
Starring Bernard Nedell, Charles Jordan, and Alfred Hopson.
35	"South Wind"	Unknown	Unknown	May 28, 1950
Starring William Post, Jr. and Peggy French.
36	"I Got What It Takes"	Unknown	Unknown	June 4, 1950
Starring William Post, Jr. and Peggy French.
37	"The Hotel of the Three Kings"	Unknown	Unknown	June 11, 1950
Starring Elwyn Harvey, Sara Anderson, and William Beach.
38	"Hands of the Enemy"	Unknown	Unknown	June 18, 1950
Starring Alfreda Wallace, Kem Dibbs, and Richard McMurray.
39	"Satan's Waitin'"	Unknown	Unknown	June 25, 1950
Starring Jeanne Cagney and Pierre Watkins.

== See also ==
- 1949-50 United States network television schedule
- Colgate Comedy Hour (1950–1955), also known as Colgate Variety Hour
