= George Estabrooks =

Canadian-American hypnotist

George Hoben Estabrooks (December 16, 1895 – December 30, 1973) was a Canadian-American psychologist and an authority on hypnosis during World War II. He was a Harvard University graduate, a Rhodes Scholar, and chairman of the Department of Psychology at Colgate University. By the 1920s, a handful of scientists, Estabrooks claimed, "had learned how to split certain complex individuals into multiple personalities like Jekyll-Hydes." This technique was the most "fascinating and dangerous applications of hypnosis ... used in military intelligence."

Estabrooks joined the First Canadian Division before he turned 20, becoming the youngest commissioned officer at that time. He eventually emigrated to the United States, where he consulted with the FBI regarding the effectiveness of hypnosis in interrogations of juvenile delinquents. During WWII, he helped the US military create "hypnotic couriers"—agents who could carry secret information in their subconscious without knowing they were doing so, making them "un-interrogatable."

After the war he was a professor of psychology at Colgate University, and a visiting professor at SUNY College at Oswego, (1964–1966) and Monmouth College (Illinois) (1966–67). He became a 32nd degree Knight Templar Mason. Between 1941 and 1961, he wrote, co-wrote and edited a total of six books Man, The Mechanical Misfit (1941), Hypnotism (1943), Death in the Mind [a hypnosis-themed novel, written in collaboration with the mystery writer Richard Lockridge] (1945), Spiritism (1947), Hypnosis: Current Problems with Nancy Gross (1960), and The Future of the Human Mind, a Symposium (1961).

In an interview with the Village Voice, Jane Roberts revealed that "Dr. Instream" was a pseudonym for Estabrooks in the Seth Material and that he conducted remote viewing tests of "Seth" for about one year, during 1966, while on the SUNY-Oswego faculty.

== Bibliography ==
=== Books ===
- Man, The Mechanical Misfit. New York: Macmillan, 1941.
- Hypnotism. New York: E. P. Dutton & Co., 1943.
- Death in the Mind. New York: E. P. Dutton & Co., 1945.
- Spiritism. New York: E. P. Dutton & Co., 1947.
- The Future of the Human Mind: A Study of the Potential Powers of the Brain. New York: Museum Press, 1961.
- Hypnosis: Current Problems, ed. New York: Colgate University, 1960.

=== Articles ===
- "The Future of Hypnosis". American Journal of Clinical Hypnosis, vol. 3, no. 1 (1960), pp. 49–54. doi:10.1080/00029157.1960.10404347.
- "Hypnosis Comes of Age". Science Digest (Apr. 1971), pp. 44-50.

=== Conference proceedings ===
- Hypnosis: Current Problems – Theory and Research Methodology in Specific Fields. Harper's Psychological Series. New York: Harper & Row. OCLC 14619894. 285 pp.

Papers of a symposium titled Theory and Research Methodology in Specific Fields, held at Colgate University on April 1–2, 1960.

=== Articles by other authors ===
- "George Hoben Estabrooks, Ph.D., 1895–1973". American Journal of Clinical Hypnosis. 16 (3): iii. 1974. doi:10.1080/00029157.1974.10403669. Obituary.
