= Nightmare Town =

Short story by Dashiell Hammett

"Nightmare Town" is a short story written by Dashiell Hammett in 1924. It was first published in a December issue of Argosy All-Story Weekly magazine. It became the title story of a 1948 collection of four Hammett short stories published in paperback with illustrations. It appeared again in 1999, the eponymous story of a collection of twenty short stories edited by Kirby McCauley, Martin H Greenberg and Ed Gorman. It was adapted for BBC radio in June 2010 and read by Stuart Milligan.

== Significance ==
"Nightmare Town" begins as an adventure story, and Threefall is typical of the rough, manly hero often to be found in the genre. However, the setting is no adventure story environment, but according to Panek, a modern-day Sodom and Gomorrah, "Izzard is the city in the desert whose iniquity leads to its own destruction." (Panek, 2004) It is the Prohibition Era, and violence and criminality are the foundations on which the town was built. Hammett had hit upon a theme which he would develop in subsequent work, such as Corkscrew (1925) and his acclaimed novel, Red Harvest (1926).

== Style ==
Hammett's work moved away from the drawing-room detective of the "Golden Age" of English detective fiction exemplified in the work of Arthur Conan Doyle, Dorothy L. Sayers and Agatha Christie. In his 1944 critical essay The Simple Art of Murder, Raymond Chandler wrote of Hammett's themes and style:

"Hammett took murder out of the Venetian vase and dropped it into the alley; it doesn’t have to stay there forever, but it was a good idea to begin by getting as far as possible from Emily Post’s idea of how a well-bred debutante gnaws a chicken wing. He wrote at first (and almost to the end) for people with a sharp, aggressive attitude to life. They were not afraid of the seamy side of things; they lived there. Violence did not dismay them; it was right down their street."

== Plot ==
Steve Threefall accepts a bet with a hotelier in Whitetufts that he can drive a friend's Ford non-stop across the desert with no supplies but liquor. After two days driving, he careens through the main street of a desert boom town named Izzard, Arizona. He narrowly misses knocking down a young woman. He mumbles a drunken apology but she ignores him. His car ends up smashed into the red brick wall of the Bank of Izzard. The marshal, Grant Fernie, jails him overnight for drunk and dangerous driving.

The next morning he pays a fine and as he leaves the courthouse he witnesses an altercation between two of the town's denizens, a large, beefy man named W.W. Ormsby and a thin man in his thirties, who is his son, Larry. Larry even pulls a gun on his father by way of warning. Steve goes to send a telegram to Whitetufts to collect on his bet. He meets the young woman he almost knocked down. She works there and her name is Nova Vallance. She is engrossed in conversation with Larry, but they hush up as soon as they see Steve watching them. Steve tries to apologize to Nova but she turns her back on him. He sends his telegram and wanders outside.

He meets a melancholy man named Roy Kamp. Roy tells him about the town. The main industry is a ‘soda niter’ (sodium nitrate) chemical plant. Dave Brackett is the banker, W.W. Ormsby owns the plant and Larry Ormsby imports flashy cars and is in love with Nova. Conan Elder deals in real estate, insurance and securities. Steve assumes that Larry was roughing up his father because of business interests. Roy takes Steve to Finn's Lunchroom. Old Man Rymer, a blind man in his seventies, is eating a meal at the counter. Roy confides to Steve the legend that Rymer, who lives alone, has a stash of gold coins hidden under the floorboards of his shack. Roy says that this desert boom-town draws merciless men.

Late that night, having played poker, Roy and Steve walk by the Izzard Hotel. Several men rush out of the hotel, attacking Steve and Roy. Steve fights back, using the ebony stick he carries as weapon. Steve takes a beating but manages to fight and the men run away. Roy is fatally wounded. Just as Roy is about to tell Steve something, the marshal interrupts and Steve doesn't hear what Roy was about to say. Roy dies. The marshal sends Steve to find Dr. MacPhail to tend his wounds.

Steve finds the doctor's house. He finds Nova there, she rents a room in the doctor's house. She is terrified. She suspects a burglar is in Dr. McPhail's room. She gives Steve a revolver. They go into the doctor's house together and surprise the burglar. Steve hits him with his stick but the burglar escapes. Steve is about to pursue him but Nova hangs onto him, preventing him from giving chase. Steve tries to shoot the burglar but the gun has no bullets. The house has been ransacked. Steve finds a watch and chain on the floor. Nova recognizes it as Old Man Rymer's. They go to Rymer's shack and find the place ransacked and Rymer knocked to the floor. They help him up. Rymer goes to some loose floorboards and finds it empty. Steve gives him the watch and chain. Steve and Nova walk back to the doctor's house. Nova realizes that Steve does not trust her. He says she gave him an empty gun and would not let him chase the burglar. She answers that she did not realize the gun was without bullets and that she did not want Steve to go after the burglar because she was afraid of being left alone. Nova says she has been in Izzard for three months. She says she is scared of Larry Ormsby. She says the town is a nightmare. Dr. and Mrs. MacPhail having returned to their house, Nova introduces Steve to them and the doctor tends his wounds. Steve returns to the hotel. Larry is sitting in his car outside the hotel. He warns Steve off Nova.

Next morning, Steve is expected at the inquest into Roy Kamp's murder. They produce an Austrian man whose face is covered in bandages. The marshal insists that this is the man responsible for Kamp's death. He wants Steve to identify the Austrian as Roy's murderer. Steve recognizes it as a frame-up and refuses to implicate the innocent Austrian. Steve returns to his hotel. From his room window, he sees the face of the man he had fought with the night before, the real killer. He chases him to the Ormsby Niter Corporation Building. Steve loses the man but then observes Elder with a woman, Dr. MacPhail's wife. They are intimates. Steve hears a scream. He runs to the sound and finds Dave Brackett, the banker writhing in agony. Brackett says, ‘they’ve poisoned me, the damned--’ and then dies. Steve is fired upon. He bursts into the room where the gunfire is coming from to find Larry holding a gun and his father, W.W. Ormsby, shot dead at his feet. The marshal enters. Larry lies, saying he was with Steve and they found W.W. dead and a gun-man fleeing the scene. No-one questions Steve. He keeps quiet.

That evening, Steve is out walking when he meets Nova at the doctor's house. She has heard the news from Dr. MacPhail that Brackett shot W.W. Orsmby and then had a heart attack. Steve tells her that Brackett was poisoned and W.W. was not shot by Brackett. They wonder why the doctor would lie about it. Nova says that MacPhail's medical report for Roy Kamp had named him as Henry Cumberpatch. Just then, Larry approaches. He tells Steve and Nova they must leave Izzard. Larry sways and coughs. He has been shot in the shoulder.

Larry confesses that the soda niter plant is a front for a large illegal alcohol operation that is backed by the East Coast crime syndicate. The whole town is working together. He says that W.W. (who is not really his father) instigated the scheme and that Brackett was in on it, as are Elder, Dr. MacPhail and the marshal. At first they played fair with the East Coast syndicate, gave them their cut, but then they became greedy and began to lure people to the town for work, killed them to order, gave them fake names with fake insurance policies and now they plan to set fire to the town and collect on the fake insurance. They also sold stocks and bonds on fake companies in Izzard. Roy was an investigator who was on to the truth which is why he was murdered. However, when the telegraph company sent Nova to Izzard, Larry fell in love with her. She was moral but Larry promised W.W. and the rest that he would win her over to their plan. W.W. warned Larry that Nova would have to be murdered. He gave the order to kill her but Larry got wind of the plan and warned off W.W. (which is what Steve witnessed when he came out of jail). Larry confronted W.W. who poured some drinks for Larry and Brackett. Larry did not drink. Brackett died from the poisoned drink. Larry shot W.W. Then the marshal shot Larry in the shoulder, leading Larry to shoot the marshal. Larry warns that Elder and the others are planning to torch the town tonight.

Steve hears Nova calling out. Dr. and Mrs. MacPhail are attempting to kill Nova. Steve fights and stops them. Steve and Nova leave. Larry promises to take care of Dr. and Mrs. MacPhail. Steve and Nova go over to Rymer's place. They try to make him ready to leave with them before the arson. He goes to change his clothes. Larry arrives in his car, ready for their getaway. The fire has started. However, Rymer comes out with two guns, his eyes now working; the film on his eyes was phony. There is a shoot-out and Rymer is shot. Larry dies from blood loss. Steve is attacked by a number of men, but he fights them off with his stick. Steve and Nova manage to get to the car. They drive into the desert. Steve and Nova plan to go to Delaware together, leaving Izzard - the nightmare town aflame.
