= Mr. and Mrs. North =

Fictional American amateur detectives created by Frances and Richard Lockridge

Jerry and Pamela North
- First edition cover of Mr. and Mrs. North
- First appearance: Mr. and Mrs. North (1936)
- Last appearance: Murder by the Book (1963)
- Created by: Frances and Richard Lockridge
- Portrayed by: Albert Hackett & Peggy Conklin (stage); William Post, Jr. & Gracie Allen (film); Alice Frost (radio) & Joseph Curtin; Richard Denning & Barbara Britton (radio/TV)

In-universe information
- Gender: Male & Female
- Occupation: Amateur detectives
- Nationality: American

Mr. and Mrs. North are fictional American amateur detectives. Created by Frances and Richard Lockridge, the couple was featured in a series of 26 Mr. and Mrs. North novels, a Broadway play, a motion picture and several radio and television series.

== History ==
The characters originated in 1930s vignettes written by Richard Lockridge for The Sun, and he brought them back for short stories in The New Yorker. These stories were collected in Mr. and Mrs. North (1936). Lockridge increased the readership after he teamed with his wife Frances on a novel, The Norths Meet Murder (1940), launching a series of 26 novels, including Death Takes a Bow, Death on the Aisle and The Dishonest Murderer. Their long-run series continued for over two decades and came to an end in 1963 with the death of Frances Lockridge. The series was unusual in that it was Mrs. North who often solved the cases, while Mr. North was just background much of the time. In his article, "Married Sleuths," Charles L.P. Silet captured the flavor of the novels:

The Mr. and Mrs. North novels contain carefully crafted puzzles and the Lockridges usually play fair with their readers. The series also features Pam and Jerry's warmly humorous domestic environment and the couple's witty exchanges with the duller members of the police force. Although the Norths remain the focus of the series, the books contain a good deal of political and social commentary, a richly detailed look at the changing life in New York City, as well as glimpses of the outlying suburban counties. Also, the North's stable marriage relationship presents a marked contrast—and a welcome one—to the traditions of the lone detective characteristic of much other American mystery fiction. Even though the Mr. and Mrs. North novels now may appear overly deliberate in their pacing, they still prove wonderful reading as mysteries, and the glimpses they provide of our past social history give them a nostalgic and authentic period flavor. Aficionados of classic crime fiction have always appreciated this long-running series, and new readers should be encouraged to discover this witty and charming couple.

== Novels ==
1. The Norths Meet Murder (1940)
2. Murder Out of Turn (1941)
3. A Pinch of Poison (1941)
4. Death on an Aisle (1942)
5. Hanged for a Sheep (1942)
6. Death Takes a Bow (1943)
7. Killing the Goose (1944)
8. Payoff for the Banker (1945)
9. Death of a Tall Man (1946)
10. Murder Within Murder (1946)
11. Untidy Murder (1948)
12. Murder Is Served (1948)
13. The Dishonest Murderer (1949)
14. Murder in a Hurry (1950)
15. Murder Comes First (1951)
16. Dead as a Dinosaur (1952)
17. Death Has a Small Voice (1953)
18. Curtain for a Jester (1953)
19. Key to Death (1954)
20. Death of an Angel (1955)
21. Voyage Into Violence (1956)
22. Long Skeleton (1958)
23. Murder Is Suggested (1959)
24. The Judge Is Reversed (1960)
25. Murder Has Its Points (1961)
26. Murder by the Book (1963)

== Broadway and film ==
Albert Hackett and Peggy Conklin had the title roles in the Broadway production Mr. and Mrs. North, which ran 163 performances at the Belasco Theatre from January 12, 1941, to May 31, 1941. Alfred De Liagre, Jr., produced and directed the play written by Owen Davis. Supporting actors included Philip Ober and Millard Mitchell. In that version, the North's apartment is located on Greenwich Place, Manhattan, realized in a scenic design by Jo Mielziner.

The Owen Davis play became a 1942 MGM film (Mr. and Mrs. North), starring Gracie Allen and William Post, Jr., with Millard Mitchell repeating his role of Detective Mullins from the Broadway production. Others in the cast were Paul Kelly, Rose Hobart, and Keye Luke.

== Radio ==
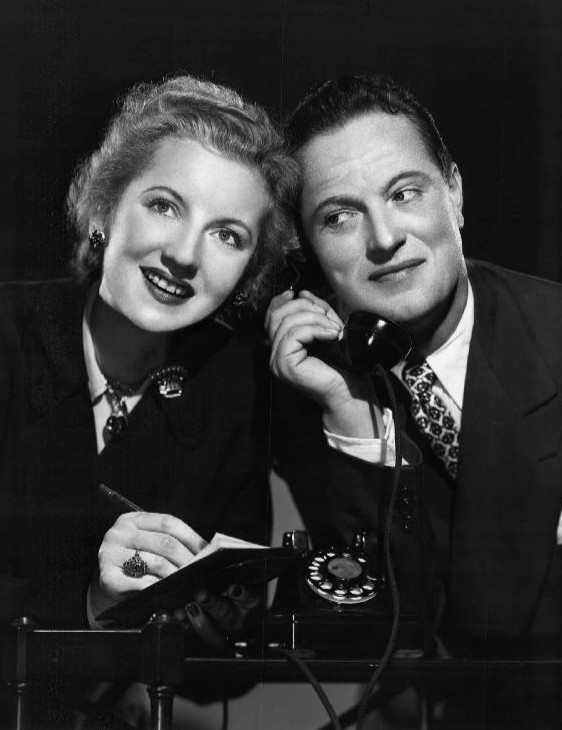
Alice Frost and Joseph Curtin as Mr. and Mrs. North (1950)

Mr. and Mrs. North was a radio mystery series that aired on NBC and CBS from 1942 to 1954. Alice Frost and Joseph Curtin had the title roles when the series began in 1942. The characters, publisher Jerry North and his wife Pam, lived in Greenwich Village at 24 St. Anne's Place. They were not professional detectives but simply an ordinary couple who stumbled across a murder or two every week for 12 years. The radio program eventually reached nearly 20 million listeners.

In 1946, Mr. and Mrs. North received the first Best Radio Drama Edgar Award from the Mystery Writers of America (in a tie with CBS's The Adventures of Ellery Queen). The program, which was broadcast once in 1941 and continuously from December 1942 through December 1946 on NBC Radio (for Woodbury Soap), and from July 1947 to April 1955 on CBS Radio (for Colgate-Palmolive and, later, Adler sewing machines), featured Carl Eastman (1941), Joseph Curtin (1942–53) and Richard Denning (1953–55) as Jerry North. Pam North was played by Peggy Conklin (1941), Alice Frost (1942–53) and Barbara Britton (1953–55). In his book, Radio Crime Fighters, Jim Cox wrote that the couple:

… who passed themselves off as a publisher and his homemaker-spouse continued to make lighthearted wisecracks as they stepped over bodies in dark alleys and were rendered unconscious by unknown assailants dispensing blows to the head almost every week ... The feminine half of the twosome was at least equal to the husband in solving cases that often baffled law-enforcement officers with years of training and practice—except in reading clues. No explanation was given, of course, as to why a couple of misfits could be so successful in their preoccupation while the professionals thrashed about ineffectually."

== Television ==
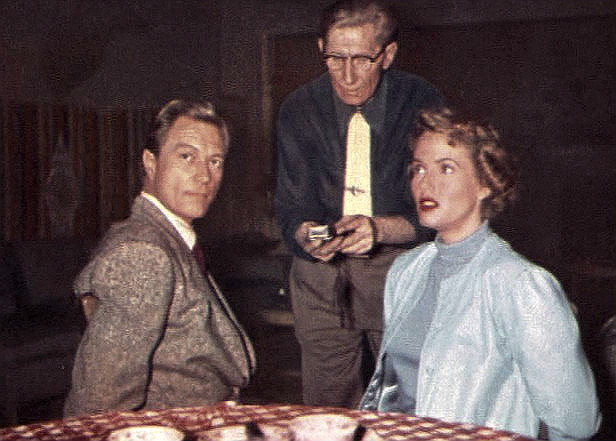
Richard Denning and Barbra Britton on the set of Mr. and Mrs. North

In 1946, producer-director Fred Coe brought the Owen Davis play to television (on New York City's WNBT) with John McQuade and Maxine Stewart in the leads and Don Haggerty, Joan Marlowe, and Millard Mitchell repeating their Broadway roles.

Joseph Allen and Mary Lou Taylor played Mr. and Mrs. North from July 1949 in NBC Presents (1 Season of 21 Episodes).

Barbara Britton and Richard Denning starred in the TV adaptation, produced by John W. Loveton, seen on CBS from 1952 to 1953 and on NBC in 1954, sponsored by Revlon cosmetics and Congoleum-Nairn, Inc. Francis De Sales starred in 25 episodes as police Lieutenant Bill Weigand, only his second screen role. Guest stars included Edgar Barrier, Gloria Blondell, Raymond Burr, Hans Conried, Mara Corday, Lawrence Dobkin, Fifi D'Orsay, Kathryn Givney, Lisa Howard, Rita Johnson, I. Stanford Jolley, Carolyn Jones, Katy Jurado, James Kirkwood, Jimmy Lydon, Dayton Lummis, Julia Meade, Dolores Moran, Jeanette Nolan, Ge Ge Pearson, William Schallert, Georgie Stone, Gloria Talbott and Norma Varden. In his early days at WPTZ TV in Philadelphia, Ernie Kovacs and Edie Adams occasionally spoofed the show in sketches titled Mr. & Mrs. South on Kovacs's' morning comedy show Three To Get Ready. zed
