= Frances and Richard Lockridge =

American detective fiction writers

- The Lockridges in 1950 with their cat Martini
- Born: Frances Louise Lockridge; January 10, 1896; Kansas City, Missouri Richard Orson Lockridge; September 26, 1898; St. Joseph, Missouri
- Died: February 17, 1963 (aged 67) (Frances) June 19, 1982 (aged 83); Tryon, North Carolina (Richard)
- Occupation: Authors

Frances Louise Lockridge (January 10, 1896 – February 17, 1963) and Richard Orson Lockridge (September 26, 1898 in St. Joseph, Missouri – June 19, 1982 in Tryon, North Carolina) were American writers of detective fiction. The pair wrote 50 novels together, including one of the most famous American mystery series, Mr. and Mrs. North. They also wrote other series, including Lt Heimrich, Nathan Shapiro, and Paul Lane.

== Biographies ==
Frances was born in Kansas City, Missouri, in 1896. She attended the University of Kansas, though she did not graduate, and worked as a reporter and music critic at various publications including the Kansas City Journal-Post, Kansas City Kansan, and Kansas City Star.

Richard was born in St. Joseph, Missouri, and was educated at the University of Missouri. After serving in the United States Navy, he returned to Missouri, working as a reporter on the Kansas City Kansan and the Kansas City Star.

Frances and Richard were married in 1922. Soon after, the couple moved to New York where Richard Lockridge joined the old New York Sun. In 1932, Richard published his first book, Darling of Misfortune: Edwin Booth: 1833–1893.

In 1960, the Lockridges were co-presidents of the Mystery Writers of America. They received a special Edgar Award in 1962. Richard Lockridge had received an Edgar in 1945 for best radio play.

Frances died on 17 February 1963. In 1965, Richard married Hildegarde Dolson, a New York freelance writer. He continued to write Lt. Heimrich, Nathan Shapiro, and Paul Lane novels, as well as non-series mystery novels, but he wrote no Mr. and Mrs. North novels after Frances's death. Richard died in 1982 after a series of strokes.

== Writings ==
The Lockridges' various book series take place in a shared universe. The Lt. Heimrich series was a spin-off of the Mr. and Mrs. North series. A retired college professor who first assists Heimrich with a case in Accent on Murder (1958) and again in Murder Can't Wait (1964)—a book that also features the meeting of Nathan Shapiro and Merton Heimrich—shows up to help ADA Bernie Simmons in Twice Retired (1970). Bill Weigand, who as a homicide lieutenant was the police friend of Mr. and Mrs. North throughout their series, is referred to occasionally as the division captain in the Paul Lane book. Lane's partner, Johnny Stein, is presumably the Sgt. Stein (no first name) who assisted Bill Weigand in the Mr. and Mrs. North novels. All the books make frequent use of real New York landmarks, such as the Charles French Restaurant in Greenwich Village, as well as share several fictional landmarks, such as "Dyckman University."

In their collaborations, Frances would generally produce the plot of the novels, while Richard would flesh out the writing. Richard said in one interview: "we had story conferences, and wrote a summary. As we both insisted, the writing was entirely mine." In 1962, the Chicago Tribune's Harry Hansen wrote, "I asked the pair where they got their plots. Richard Lockridge pointed to his wife; she thinks up the complications, he puts them into prose." The Lockridges' books were all jointly bylined: their Mr. and Mrs. North books as "Frances and Richard Lockridge"; the Lt. Heimrich books as "Richard and Frances Lockridge."

=== Mr. and Mrs. North series ===
In 1937, Frances Lockridge conceived the plot for a detective novel, but had problems with her characters. Richard Lockridge collaborated with his wife, using her plot and the characters he had created earlier for a series of comic sketches in The New Yorker, Mr. and Mrs. North (named for the "stupid people who played the north hand in bridge problems," according to Lockridge). The book was published in 1940 as The Norths Meet Murder, launching a series of twenty-six novels, which was adapted for the stage, film, radio, and television.

- Mr. and Mrs. North (1936)
- The Norths Meet Murder (1940)
- Murder Out of Turn (1941)
- A Pinch of Poison (1941)
- Death on the Aisle (1942)
- Death Takes a Bow (1943)
- Hanged for a Sheep (1944)
- Killing the Goose (1944)
- Payoff for the Banker (1945)
- Murder Within Murder (1946)
- Death of a Tall Man (1946)
- Untidy Murder (1947)
- Murder Is Served (1948)
- The Dishonest Murderer (1949)
- Murder in a Hurry (1950)
- Murder Comes First (1951)
- Dead as a Dinosaur (1952)
- Death Has a Small Voice (1953)
- Curtain for a Jester (1953)
- A Key for Death (1954)
- Death of an Angel (1955)
- Voyage into Violence (1956)
- The Long Skeleton (1958)
- Murder is Suggested (1959)
- The Judge is Reversed (1960)
- Murder Has Its Points (1961)
- Murder by the Book (1963)

=== Lt. Heimrich series ===
In the second Mr. and Mrs. North novel, Murder Out of Turn (1941), the couple and their New York City homicide detective friend, Lt. Bill Weigand, encounter murder out of town, near Brewster, New York. There they meet an officer of the New York State Bureau of Criminal Identification (referred to in some later books as the Bureau of Criminal Investigation), Lt. Heimrich (in later books given the first name Merton, and achieving promotion to captain). Heimrich also guest-starred in a 1946 Mr. and Mrs. North book, Death of a Tall Man, before becoming the star of his own series of twenty-two novels, beginning with Think of Death (1947). Richard continued the series after Frances' death in 1963.

Co-written by Richard and Frances:

- I Want to Go Home (1948)
- Spin Your Web, Lady (1949)
- Foggy, Foggy Death (1950)
- A Client is Cancelled (1951)
- Death by Association (1952)
- Stand Up and Die (1953)
- Death and the Gentle Bull (1954)
- Burnt Offering (1955)
- Let Dead Enough Alone (1956)
- Practice to Deceive (1957)
- Accent on Murder (1958)
- Show Red for Danger (1960)
- With One Stone (1961)
- First Come, First Kill (1962)
- The Distant Clue (1963)

Written by Richard:

- Murder Can't Wait (1964)
- Murder Roundabout (1966)
- With Option to Die (1967)
- A Risky Way to Kill (1969)
- Inspector's Holiday (1971)
- Not I, Said the Sparrow (1973)
- Dead Run (1976)
- The Tenth Life (1977)

=== Nathan Shapiro series ===
Richard and Frances Lockridge began a third detective series with The Faceless Adversary (1956), featuring New York City Police detective, Nathan Shapiro. Shapiro was a sad-sack of a detective, who always assumed some other detective would be more skilful or more insightful. He always thinks that the promotions he receives are undeserved. People he encounters wonder what makes him appear to be so depressed. Shapiro also appeared in one Heimrich novel, Murder Can't Wait (1964). Richard and Frances co-wrote the first four novels in the series, and it eventually ran to ten books. This includes the last novel Richard published, The Old Die Young (1980).

Co-written by Richard and Frances:

- The Faceless Adversary (1956)
- Murder and Blueberry Pie (1959)
- The Tangled Cord (1960)
- The Drill Is Death (1961)

Written by Richard:

- Murder for Art's Sake (1967)
- Die Laughing (1969)
- Preach No More (1971)
- Write Murder Down (1972)
- Or Was He Pushed? (1975)
- A Streak of Light (1976)
- The Old Die Young (1980)

=== Paul Lane series ===
Richard and Frances Lockridge began a fourth detective series with Night of the Shadows (1962), a police procedural featuring a New York City Police detective, Paul Lane. Lane was the main character in Quest for the Bogeyman (1964), and then he and partner Sgt., then later Lt., John Stein, were prominently featured in the six novels focused on New York County assistant district attorney Bernard Simmons that followed that character's first appearance, in And Left for Dead (1961). (The novels featuring the interplay and occasional conflicts between ADA Bernie Simmons and Lane and Stein prefigures the Law & Order television series.)

=== Other writings ===
Outside of their series, the Lockridges co-wrote the novels Catch as Catch Can (1951), The Innocent House (1958), The Golden Man (1960), and The Ticking Clock (1961). They also wrote several short non-fiction books about cats, including Cats and People (1960).

On her own, Frances wrote the 1928 book How to Adopt a Child. From 1922 to 1942, she worked for the adoption and placement committee of the State Aid Charities Association. She also for several years wrote the New York Times' "Hundred Neediest" column.

Richard also wrote an espionage novel about the military uses of hypnotism with the pschologist George Hoben Estabrooks, Death in the Mind (1945), and two non-mystery novels, The Empty Day (1965) and Encounter in Key West (1966). He co-authored Michael J. McKeogh's memoir of World War II, Sgt. Mickey and General Ike (1946). With his first wife, Lockridge wrote three short non-fiction books about cats. He wrote a memoir of his courtship of his second wife, Hildegarde Dolson, in One Lady, Two Cats (1967).
