= Paris is well worth a mass =

1593 alleged saying by Henry IV of France

The phrase "Paris is well worth a mass" (French: Paris vaut bien une messe) describes the readiness to compromise principles for the pragmatic gain, making a small sacrifice for a large advantage. It alludes to the second religious conversion, back to Catholicism, by Henry of Navarre, who underwent it in order to become a king, Henry IV of France, on 25 July 1593. "Mass" here refers to Catholic liturgy, and describes either an obligation of a good Catholic to attend the mass regularly, or a particular mass that involves the coronation (cf. Liturgy of state). While the attribution of this wit to Henry himself is apocryphal, the historians agree that the motives for his conversion were indeed almost entirely political.

== Background ==
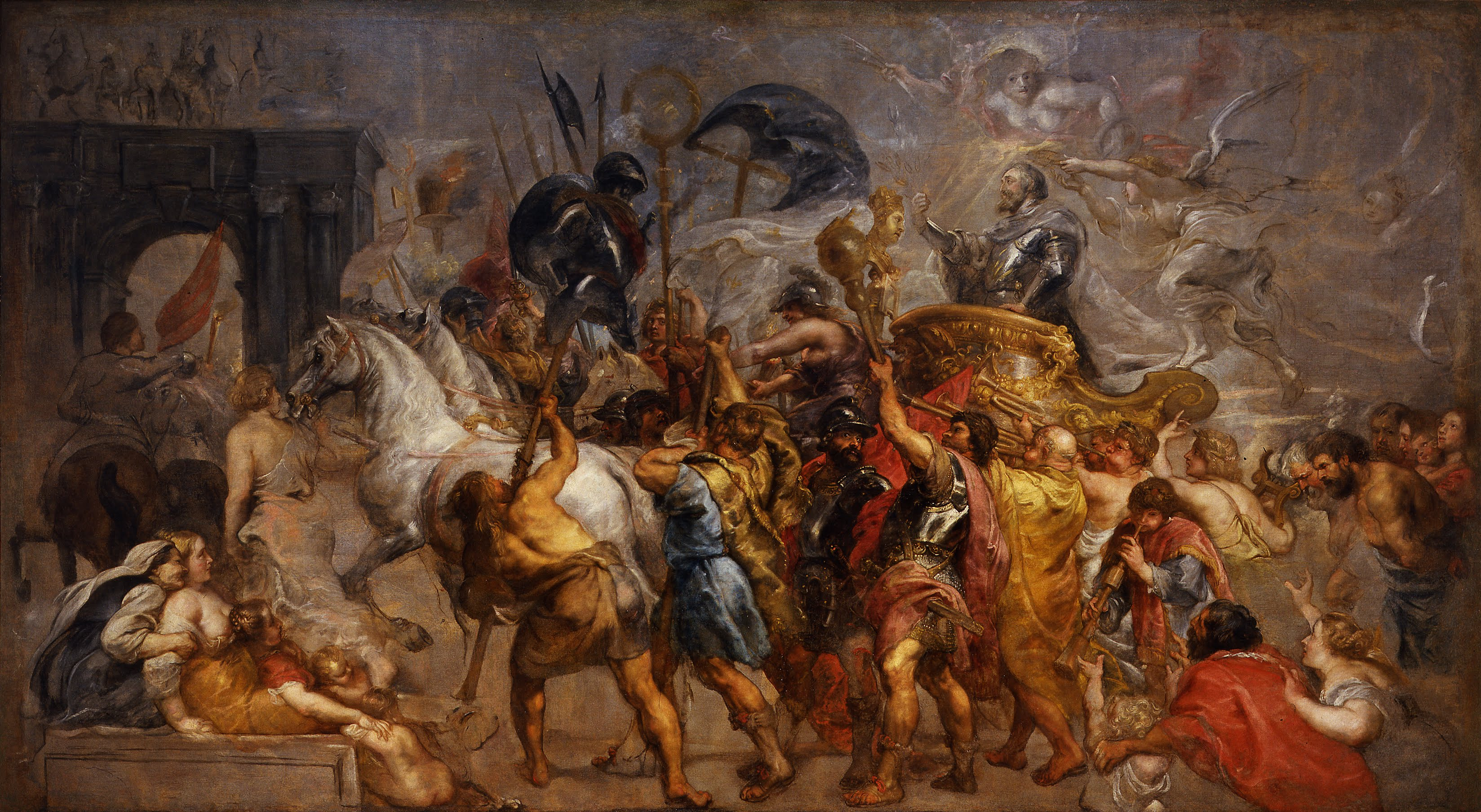
The Triumphal Entry of Henry IV into Paris (Rubens, 1627)

Henry of Navarre was a Protestant king poised to become a king of France as the Valois dynasty was withering without a male heir. He married Margaret of Valois, a Catholic princess. When the wedding ended up in the Massacre of St. Bartholomew, Henry was able to survive by making a promise to convert to Catholicism. He remained a Protestant, the War of the Three Henrys ensued, with Henry of Navarre eventually prevailing. Still, he was unable to take control of Paris, and, on 25 July 1593, with the encouragement of his mistress, Gabrielle d'Estrées, Henry permanently renounced Protestantism and converted to Catholicism to secure his hold on the French crown.

== Origins ==
Henry IV was known as a cautious and calculating monarch, so historians, starting with Édouard Fournier in the 19th century, consider him unlikely to be the one uttering such a controversial phrase. Konstantin Dushenko notes that the popularity of modern form of the phrase can be traced back to its use by Voltaire in 1766. Voltaire in this passage expressed his opinion that the religion is a matter of expediency and an instrument of governance.

As Fournier had pointed out, in an anonymous collection of anecdotes published in 1622 (Les Caquets de l'accouchée), the phrase is spoken to Henry of Navarre by Maximilien de Béthune, Duke of Sully. Sully advised Henry to convert to Catholicism, yet remained a Protestant himself. When asked by Henry why he was not attending mass himself, the duke supposedly replied, "Sire, sire, the crown is worth a mass" ("French: Sire, sire, la couronne vaut bien une messe").

The contemporary diaries of Pierre de L'Estoile contain yet another version of events, written down in January-February of 1594: when Henry IV asked an anonymous courtier if the latter was going to mass, the courtier answered in the affirmative, adding "since you, sire, are going too". Henry supposedly replied, French: Ah! [J]'entends bien que c'est: vous avez volontiers quelque couronne a gagner ("Now I understand: you are also looking to get some crown").

Ph. Roget, a conservateur des bibliothèques at the Bibliothèque de Genève, pointed in 1892 to another contemporary document with a title starting with "Remonstrance chrétienne et métamorphose pour la justification des chrétiens enfans fidè..." ("Christian Remonstrance and Metamorphosis for the Justification of Faithful Christian Children...", the title is so long that Roget does not write it down in full). This 516-page-long document was written by Mathieu de Launoy, printed in 1601 somewhere in the domain of Philip II of Spain, and is addressed to Henry IV. On pages 363-364 de Launoy reports that a "heretic" hiding behind the initials A.N.L.D.F.M. in some Latin tractate had written about an exchange between the French king and a courtier: "Are you going to the mass? − Following your example − You are a cunning man, do you think that your mass is, like mine, worth the French crown?" (French: Tu es un mal habile homme, penses-tu que ta messe vaille une couronne de France, comme la mienne).

== Use in culture ==
Henry Boyer, a French linguist, compares the phrase "Paris is well worth a mass" with a palimpsest: the text and its origins are so well known to readers that it became a generic template "X is well worth Y" reused in entirely different contexts, like:

- "Paris is well worth a prize" (1987 announcement of a prize by RATP);
- "Palestine is well worth a mass" (an article in Libération about the renovation of Bethlehem and special midnight mass scheduled for Christmas in 1999).

== Sources ==
- Boyer, Henri (2001). "L'incontournable paradigme des représentations partagées dans le traitement de la compétence culturelle en français langue étrangère". Éla. Études de linguistique appliquée (in French). 123–124 (3): 333–340. doi:10.3917/ela.123.0333. ISSN 0071-190X.
- de L'Estoile, Pierre (1906). Journal de L'Estoile: extraits [1594] (in French). A. Colin. p. 187.
- Dickerman, Edmund H. (1977). "The Conversion of Henry IV". The Catholic Historical Review. 63 (1): 1–13. ISSN 0008-8080. JSTOR 25020023.
- Dushenko, Konstantin (2011-04-07). "Генрих IV Бурбон" [Henry IV of Bourbons]. Большой словарь цитат и крылатых выражений [The big dictionary of quotes and wits] (in Russian). Litres. ISBN 978-5-457-02195-2.
- Fournier, Edouard (1857). "XXI". L'esprit dans l'histoire: recherches et curiosités sur les mots historiques (in French). Dentu.
- Haxo, Henry (January 1922). "The Critical Attitude of the French Mind". Quarterly Journal. 12 (2). University of North Dakota: 122–155.
- Holt, Mack P. (1995). The French Wars of Religion, 1562-1629. Cambridge University Press.
- Planelles, Georges (2019-10-31). "Paris vaut bien une messe". Les 1001 expressions préférées des Français (in French). Les Éditions de l'Opportun. ISBN 978-2-36075-876-0.
- Roget, Ph.[ilippe] (1892). "Un nouveau document donné par un contemporain sur le mot historique Paris vaut bien une messe Il existe". L'Intermédiaire des chercheurs et curieux (in French). 25. Benj. Duprat, Libraire de l'Institut: 462–464.
- Shriner, Charles Anthony (1918). "Henry IV". Wit, Wisdom and Foibles of the Great: Together with Numerous Anecdotes Illustrative of the Characters of People and Their Rulers ... Funk and Wagnalls. pp. 278–280.
- Voltaire (1893). "Le Président de Thou justifié contre les accusations de M. de Bury [1766]". In Moland, Louis (ed.). OEuvres complètes de Voltaire (in French). Vol. 25. Paris: Garnier. pp. 477–490.
- Webber, Elizabeth; Feinsilber, Mike (1999). "Paris is well worth a mass". Merriam-Webster's Dictionary of Allusions. Springfield, Mass: Merriam-Webster. pp. 403–404. ISBN 0-87779-628-9.
