= Sénac (surname) =

Sénac is a commune in Hautes-Pyrénées, France. Notable people with the surname Sénac or Senac include:

- Didier Sénac (born 1958), French footballer
- Felix Senac (1815–1866), Confederate States Navy agent
- Gabriel Sénac de Meilhan (1736–1803), French writer
- Guy Sénac (1932–2019), French footballer
- Jean Sénac (1926–1973), Algerian author
- Jean-Baptiste de Sénac (1693–1770), French physician
- Jean-Charles Sénac (born 1985), French bicycle racer.
- Régis Sénac, French fencer
- Réjane Sénac (born 1975), French political scientist
