= De Gennes =

De Gennes may refer to:

== People ==
- Charles Dubois de Gennes (1814–1876), French writer, journalist and chansonnier
- Jean-Baptiste de Gennes (c. 1656 – 1795), French naval officer, governor of Saint-Christophe
- Jean Dubois de Gennes (1895–1929), World War I flying ace
- Pierre-Gilles de Gennes (1932–2007), French physicist and Nobel Prize winner

== Other ==
- De Gennes Prize, awarded biennially by the Royal Society of Chemistry

== See also ==
- Gennes
