= Eugène Hatin =

French historian, journalist and bibliographer (1809–1893)

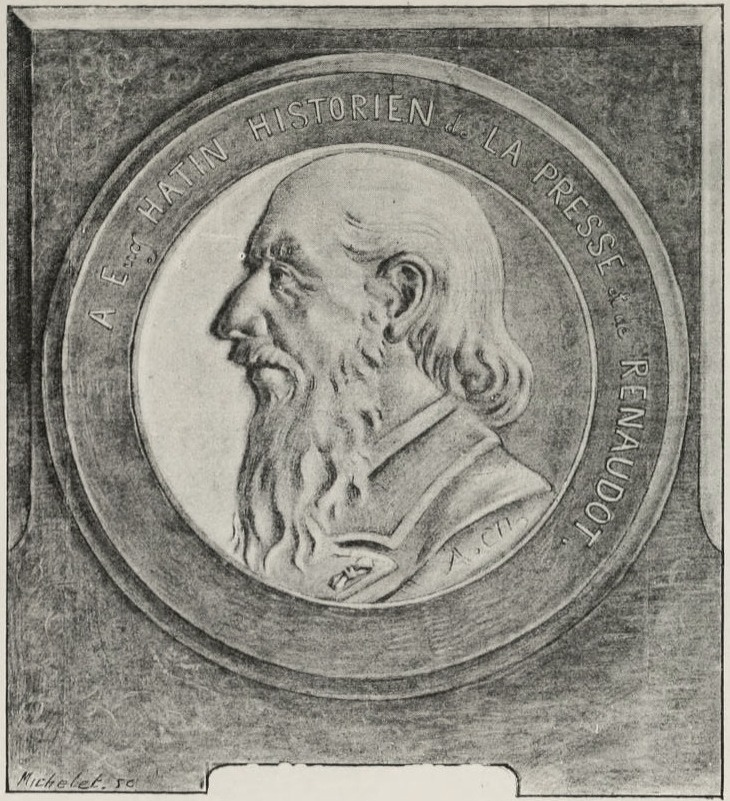
- Born: 8 September 1809; Auxerre
- Died: 16 September 1893 (aged 84); Paris
- Occupations: Historian; Journalist; Bibliographer.

Eugène Louis Hatin (8 September 1809 – 16 September 1893) was a 19th-century French historian, journalist and bibliographer.

== Biography ==
Hatin was educated at the college of his native city of Auxerre and then went to Paris where he found work as a proofreader, while engaging in various low-profile jobs in bookshops.

The first books he published, on subjects of history and geography, had only a limited success and would certainly not have been enough to make his name remembered. In 1846 he published his first work on journalism. His extensive work Histoire politique et littéraire de la presse en France was considered to have no equivalent abroad. His Bibliographie de la presse is a valuable collection filled with unusual information.

Hatin also collaborated with the Dictionnaire des dates, the Histoire des villes de France, the Complément de l’Encyclopédie du XIXe, etc., and created the first political newspaper priced at five centimes la Seine and, in 1854, the périodical l’Union littéraire later renamed Bulletin des sociétés savantes.

Eugène Hatin was made a chevalier of the Légion d’honneur in 1867.

== Works ==
- Histoire pittoresque de l’Algérie (1840, in-8°);
- La Loire et ses bords, guide pittoresque (1843, in-18);
- Histoire pittoresque des voyages dans les cinq parties du monde (1843–47, 5 vol. in-8);
- Histoire du journal en France (1631-1846) (1846, in-16, 2nd edition, significantly developed and continued until 1853, in-16);
- Histoire politique et littéraire de la presse en France (1859-1861), 8 vol. in-8 ou 8 vol. in-12;
- Les Gazettes de Hollande et la presse clandestine aux XVlle et XVIlle, (1865, in-8);
- La Presse périodique dans les deux mondes; essai historique et statistique sur les origines du journal (1866, in-8°);
- Bibliographie historique et critique de la presse périodique française (1860, in-8°);
- Manuel théorique et pratique de la liberté de la presse. Histoire, législation, doctrine et jurisprudence (1868, 2 vol. in-8°);
- Le Journal (1881, in-32);
- Théophraste Renaudot et ses innocentes inventions (1883, in-12);
- À propos de Théophraste Renaudot. L’histoire, la fantaisie et la fatalité (1884, in-8°);
- La Maison du Grand-Coq et le Bureau d’adresses, berceau de notre premier journal (1885, in-12).

== Sources ==
- Polybiblion, Revue bibliographique universelle, Paris, Aux bureaux du Polybiblion, 1893.
- Adolphe Bitard, Dictionnaire général de biographie contemporaine française et étrangère, Paris, Maurice Dreyfous, 1878, (p. 635).
