= Édouard Fournier =

French historian, writer, bibliographer and librarian (1819-1880)

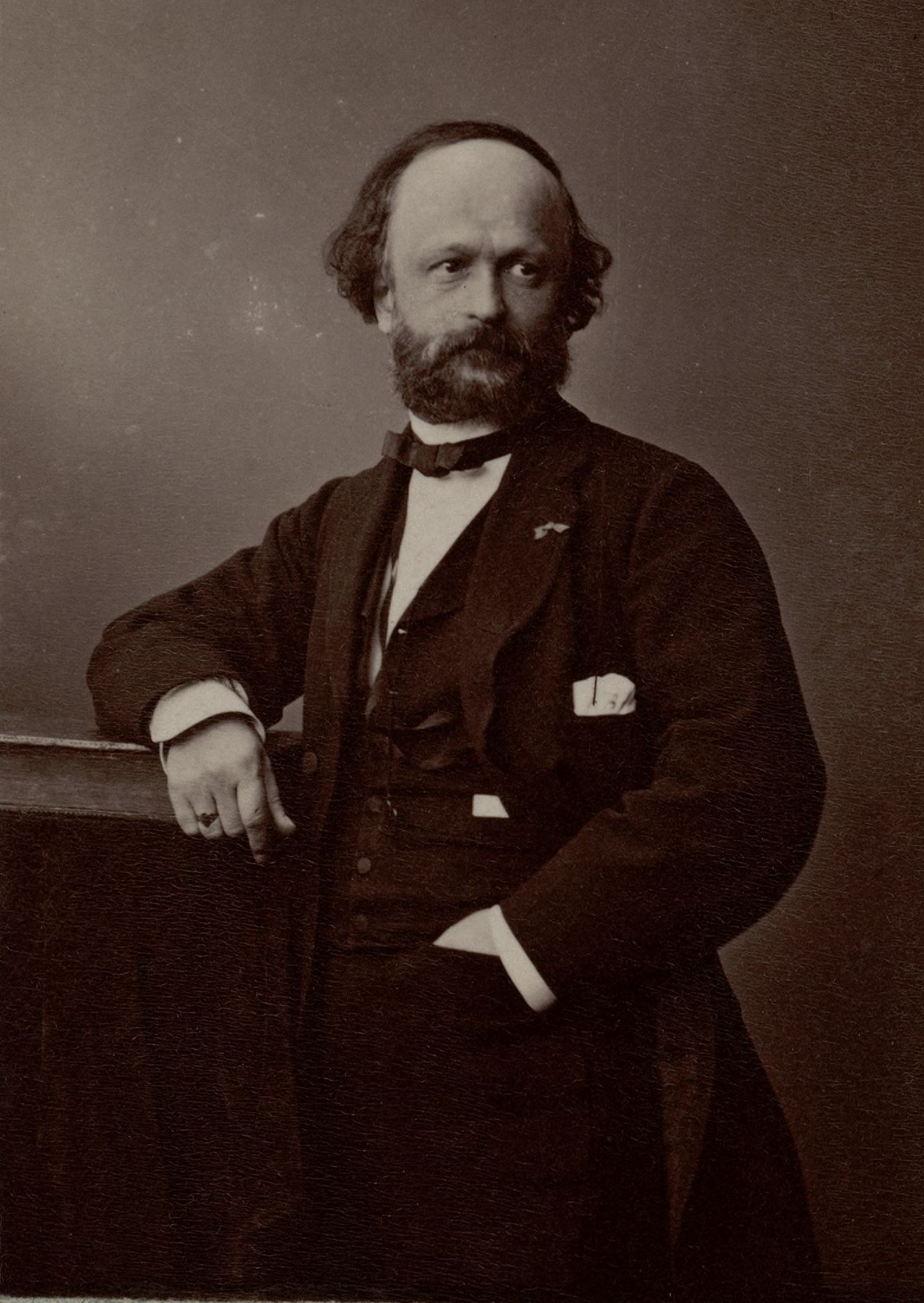

Édouard Fournier (15 June 1819, Orléans – 10 May 1880, Paris) was a French homme de lettres, playwright, historian, bibliographer and librarian.

== Biography ==
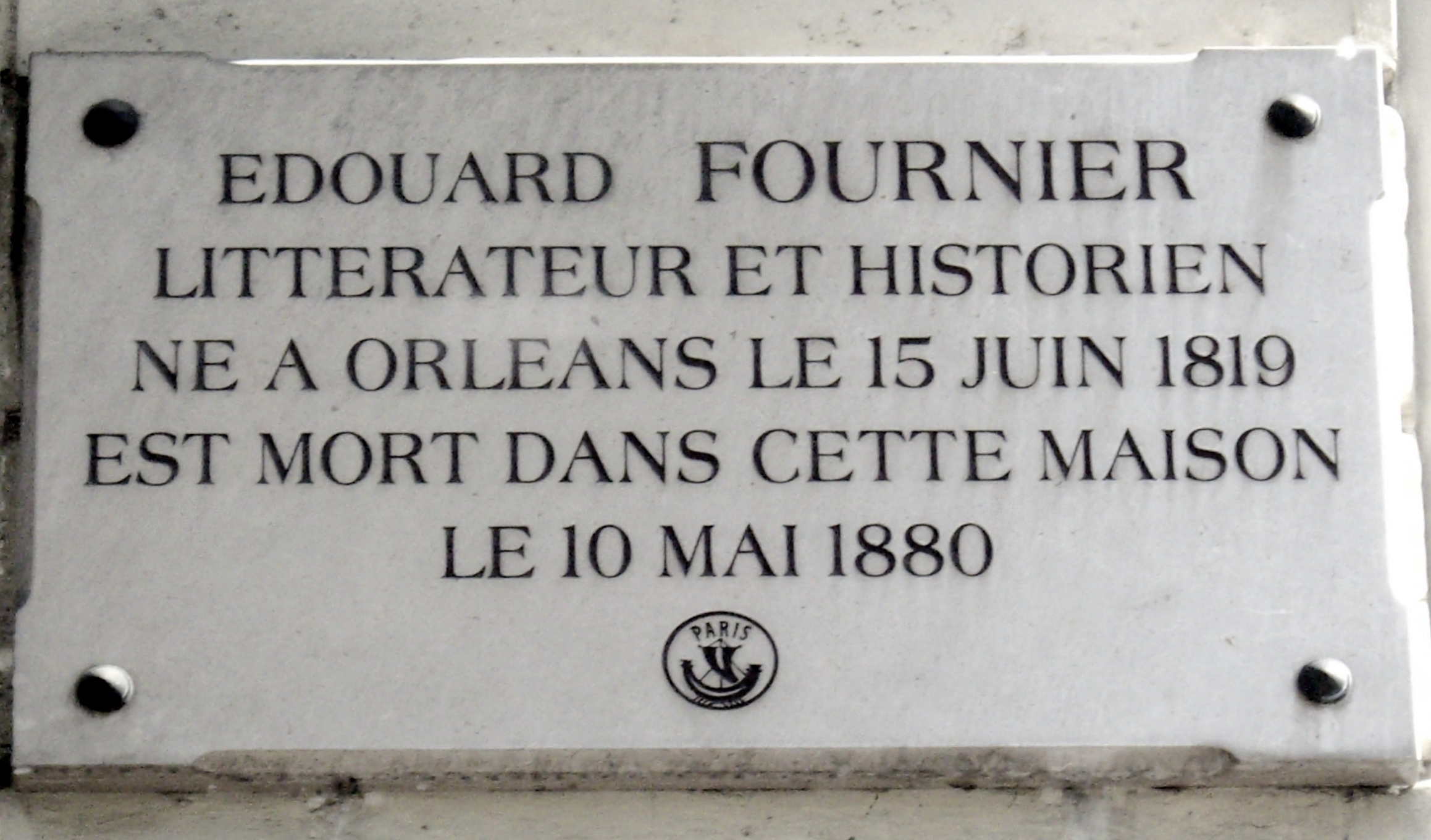
Plate affixed on Édouard Fournier's Parisian home, at 13 rue des Saints-Pères.

Born into a locksmiths artist family, he studied at the Collège d'Orléans then devoted entirely to literary work. After a first play in 1841, and some feuilletons published in the newspaper Le Loiret in 1842, he published a large number of historical, literary, literature and theater studies. He published numerous authors while continuing to write for the stage. He also contributed a great number of articles to the Encyclopédie universelle, the Supplément du Dictionnaire de la conversation, the Historie des villes de France, Le Moniteur universel, Le Constitutionnel, L'Illustration, La Revue française, Le Théâtre, whose chief editor he was from 1853 to 1855, La Patrie, where he held a Parisian theatrical chronicle from 1856, then theatrical, the Revue des provinces, of which he was director from 1863 to 1866. In 1872, he was appointed a librarian at the Interior Ministry.

== Main publications ==
- 1847: Souvenirs historiques et littéraires du Loiret
- 1847: La Musique chez le peuple ou l'Opéra-national, son passé et son avenir sur le boulevard du Temple, with Louis-Adolphe Le Doulcet de Pontécoulant
- 1849: Essai sur l'art lyrique au théâtre, depuis les anciens jusqu'à Meyerbeer, with Léon Kreutzer
- 1849: Essai historique sur l'orthographe
- 1851: Histoire des hôtelleries, cabarets, hôtels garnis, restaurants et cafés, et des anciennes communautés et confreries d'hôteliers, de marchands de vins, de restaurateurs, de limonadiers, etc., with Francisque Michel Text online 1 2
- 1851: Un prétendant portugais au XVIe siècle, lettre à M. M. D'Antas, sur Don Antonio, prieur de Crato, suivie d'études sur un prédicateur portugais à Paris en 1610, la Rosalinda et l'origine portugaise de la Fiancée du roi de Garbe
- 1852: Histoire de l'imprimerie et des arts et professions qui se rattachent à la typographie, comprenant l'histoire des anciennes corporations et confréries depuis leur fondation jusqu'à leur suppression en 1789, with Paul Lacroix and Ferdinand Seré
- 1853: Paris démoli, mosaïque de ruines
- 1854: Les Lanternes. Histoire de l'ancien éclairage de Paris, suivi de la réimpression de quelques poèmes rares : Les Nouvelles Lanternes, 1755 [by Valois d'Orville] ; Plaintes des filoux et écumeurs de bourses contre nosseigneurs les réverbères, 1769 ; Les Ambulantes à la brune contre la dureté du temps, 1769 ; Les Sultanes nocturnes, 1769
- 1854: Antoine Furetière. Le Roman bourgeois, ouvrage comique Text online
- 1855: Les Caquets de l'accouchée, anonymous account of 1622
- 1854: Chansons de Gaultier Garguille
- 1855: Curiosités des inventions et découvertes
- 1855: Curiosités militaires,
- 1855: L'Esprit des autres, Text online
- 1855–1863: Variétés historiques et littéraires, recueil de pièces volantes rares et curieuses en prose et en vers (10 volumes)
- 1856: Lettres inédites de la marquise de Créqui à Sénac de Meilhan, 1782-1789, mises en ordre et annotées by Édouard Fournier, preceded by an introduction by Sainte-Beuve
- 1856: Marie-Catherine-Hortense de Villedieu. Récit en vers et en prose de la farce des Précieuses
- 1856: L'Esprit dans l'histoire, recherches et curiosités sur les mots historiques, bnam CNAM Gallica Text online
- 1857: Alexis Piron. Œuvres
- 1858: Histoire physique, civile et morale de Paris par Jacques-Antoine Dulaure, augmentée d'une notice sur Dulaure et continuée jusqu'à nos jours par Édouard Fournier (3 volumes)
- 1859: Le Vieux-neuf, histoire ancienne des inventions et découvertes modernes (2 volumes)
- 1860: Énigmes des rues de Paris, text online
- 1862: Histoire du Pont-Neuf (2 volumes)
- 1862: Le Jeu de paume, son histoire et sa description, notice par M. Edouard Fournier, suivie d'un traité de la courte-paume et de la longue-paume, des biographies des principaux paumiers, etc.
- 1863: Le Roman de Molière, suivi de fragments sur sa vie privée, d'après des documents nouveaux, Text online
- 1864: L'Art de la reliure en France aux derniers siècles
- 1864: Chroniques et légendes des rues de Paris, Text online
- 1866: La Comédie de Jean de La Bruyère (2 volumes)
- 1867: Les Tragédies de Sophocles, texte grec avec un commentaire critique et explicatif
- 1871: Les Prussiens chez nous
- 1871: Le Théâtre français au XVIe et au XVIIe siècle, ou Choix des comédies les plus curieuses antérieures à Molière, avec une introduction, des notes et une notice sur chaque auteur
- 1873: Œuvres complètes de Nicolas Boileau, précédées de la vie de l'auteur d'après des documents nouveaux et inédits
- 1874: Voltaire. Théâtre complet
- 1875: Œuvres complètes de Regnard, précédée d'une introduction d'après des documents entièrement nouveaux
- 1876: Œuvres complètes de Beaumarchais
- 1876: Œuvres de Jean de La Fontaine : théâtre, fables, poésies, etc.
- 1877: Œuvres de Marivaux. Théâtre complet
- 1877: Histoire de la butte des Moulins, suivie d'une étude historique sur les demeures de Corneille à Paris
- 1878: Le Livre commode des adresses de Paris pour 1692 par Nicolas de Blégny, précédé d'une introduction et annoté par Édouard Fournier (2 volumes) Text online 1 2
- 1879: Scarron. Théâtre complet
- 1879: Le Mystère de Robert le Diable, mis en deux parties, avec transcription en vers modernes en regard du texte du XIVe siècle, et précédé d'une introduction par Édouard Fournier
- 1880: Souvenirs poétiques de l'école romantique, 1825 à 1840, Text online
- 1881: Théâtre choisi de Louis-Benoît Picard
- 1881: Paris-Capitale
- 1883: Paris démoli (Nouvelle édition revue et augmentée)
- 1884: Histoire des enseignes de Paris, revue et publiée par Paul Lacroix
- 1885: Études sur la vie et les œuvres de Molière, revues et mises en ordre par Paul Lacroix Text online
- 1889: Histoire des jouets et des jeux d'enfants
- Une Malouine au temps de la Révolution. Madame de Bassablons d'après les documents de l'époque (4th edition, 1922)

Theatre

- 1841: La Fête des fous, five-act drama, with Auguste Arnould, Paris, Théâtre de la Renaissance, 6 February
- 1851: Christian et Marguerite, one-act comedy, in verse, with Pol Mercier, Paris, Comédie-Française, 6 March
- 1853: Le Roman du village, one-act comedy in verse, with Pol Mercier, Paris, Théâtre de l'Odéon, 5 June
- 1854: Les Deux Épagneuls, one-act opéra comique in free verse, music by Charles Manry, Paris, Néo-Thermes, 19 December
- 1856: Le Chapeau du roi, one-act opéra comique, music by Henri Caspers, Paris, Théâtre-Lyrique, 16 April
- 1858: La Charmeuse, one-act opéra comique, music by Henri Caspers, Paris, Théâtre des Bouffes-Parisiens, 12 April
- 1859: Le Diable rose, one-act play with ariettes, with Pol Mercier, music by Hermine Déjazet, Paris, Théâtre Déjazet, 14 November
- 1860: Titus et Bérénice, opérette bouffe in 1 act, music by Léon Gastinel, Paris, Théâtre des Bouffes-Parisiens, 12 May
- 1862: Corneille à la butte Saint-Roch, one-act comedy, in verse, Paris, Théâtre-Français, 6 June
- 1862: Le Paradis trouvé, one-act comedy, in verse, with Pol Mercier, Paris, Théâtre de l'Odéon, 1 September
- 1863: La Fille de Molière, one-act comedy, in verse, Paris, Théâtre de l'Odéon, 15 January Text online
- 1864: Racine à Uzès, one-act comedy, in verse, Paris, Théâtre du Vaudeville, 21 December
- 1868: La Valise de Molière, one-act comedy, in prose, Paris, Théâtre-Français, 15 January
- 1869: Gutenberg, drama in 5 acts and in verse, Paris, Théâtre de l'Odéon, 8 April
- 1872: La Vraie Farce de Maître Pathelin, mise en 3 actes et en vers modernes, Paris, Comédie-Française, 26 November

== Sources ==
- Pierre Larousse, Grand Dictionnaire universel du XIXe siècle, vol. VIII, 1872, (p. 682–683).
- Gustave Vapereau, Dictionnaire universel des contemporains, vol. I, 1858, (p. 688).
- Adolphe Bitard, Dictionnaire général de biographie contemporaine française et étrangère, 1878, (p. 482–483).
