= The Second of May 1808 =

1814 painting by Francisco de Goya

The Second of May 1808 (The Charge of the Mamelukes)
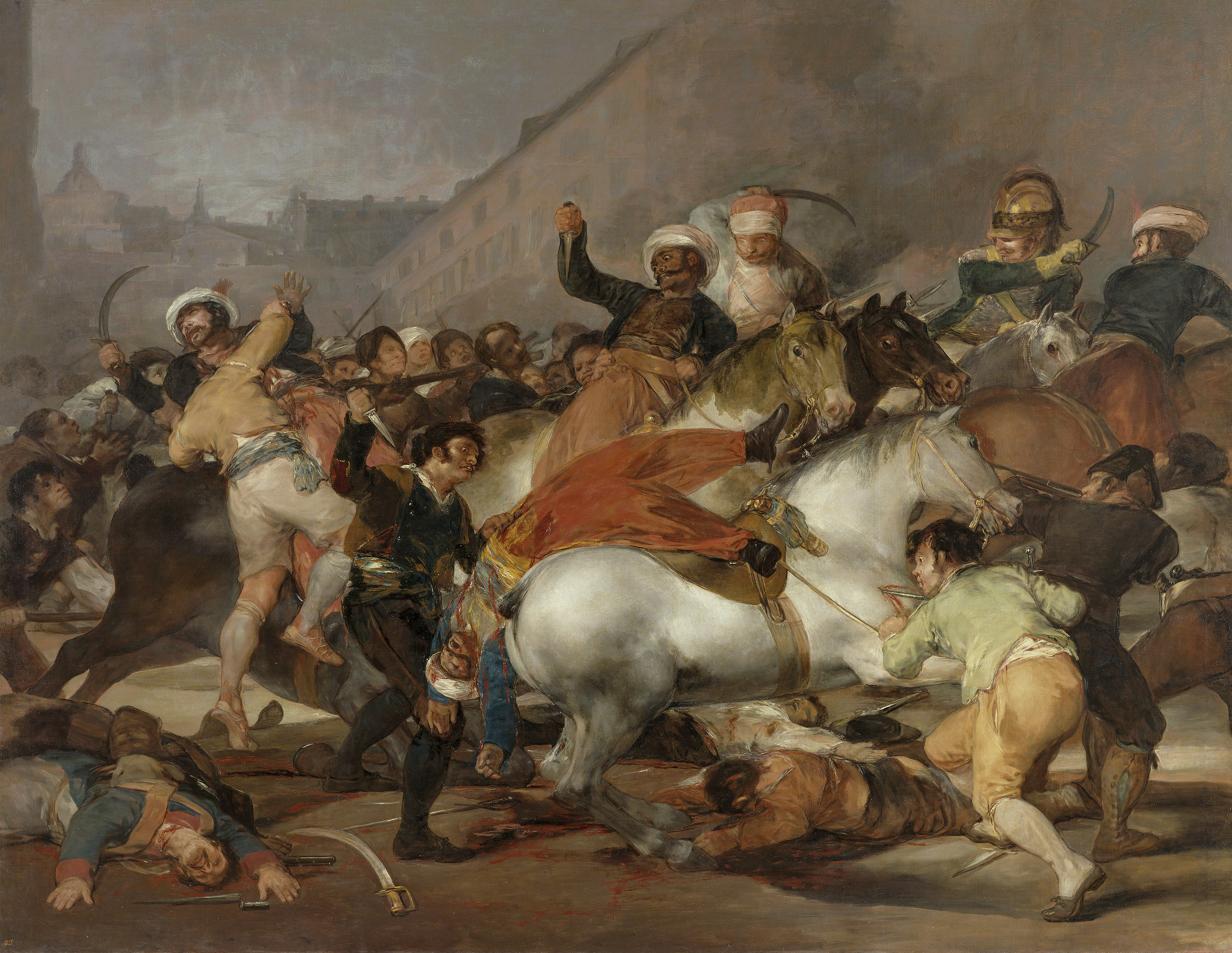
- Artist: Francisco Goya
- Year: 1814
- Medium: Oil on canvas
- Dimensions: 266 cm × 345 cm (105 in × 136 in)
- Location: Museo del Prado; Madrid

The Second of May 1808, also known as The Charge of the Mamelukes (Spanish: El 2 de mayo de 1808 en Madrid, La lucha con los mamelucos or La carga de los mamelucos), is a painting by the Spanish painter Francisco Goya. It is a companion to the painting The Third of May 1808 and is set in the Calle de Alcalá near Puerta del Sol, Madrid, during the Dos de Mayo Uprising. It depicts one of the many people's rebellions against the French occupation of Spain that sparked the Peninsular War.

Both paintings were completed within a two-month period in 1814. Today they are displayed in Madrid's Museo del Prado.

Goya witnessed first-hand the French occupation of Spain in 1808, when Napoleon used the pretext of reinforcing his army in Portugal to seize the Spanish throne, leaving his brother Joseph in power. Attempts to remove members of the Spanish royal family from Madrid provoked a widespread rebellion. This popular uprising occurred between the second and third of May 1808, when suppressed by forces under Maréchal Joachim Murat.

== Historical background ==
The Third of May 1808 was completed in 1814, two months after its companion work The Second of May 1808. It depicts executions which followed the uprising.

The Second of May 1808 depicts the beginning of the uprising when the Egyptian Mamelukes of the French Imperial Guard are ordered to charge and subdue the rioting citizens. The crowd sees the Mamelukes as Moors, provoking an angry response. Instead of dispersing, the crowd turned on the charging Mamelukes, resulting in a ferocious melee. Goya was probably not present during the actual Charge of the Mamelukes. His paintings were commissioned in 1814, after the expulsion of Napoleon's army from Spain, by the council governing Spain until the return of Ferdinand VII. He chose to portray the citizens of Madrid as unknown heroes using the crudest of weapons, such as knives, to attack a professional, occupying army. That did not please the king when he returned, so the paintings were not hung publicly until many years (and governments) later.

Goya chose not to paint any single action or to have any single focal point in order to emphasize the chaos of the drama.

== Influences ==
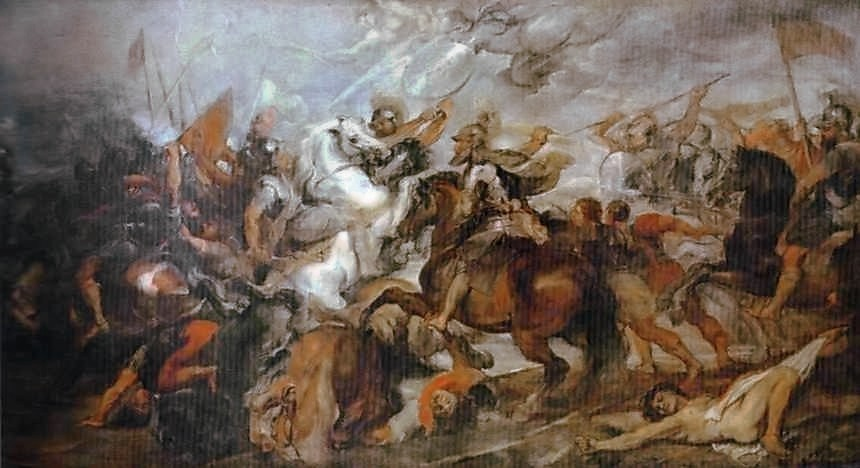
Henry IV at the Battle of Ivry by Peter Paul Rubens (Uffizi)

There has been debate about the extent to which Goya was influenced by Rubens. Goya's Saturn Devouring His Son, c. 1819–1823 suggests a familiarity with Rubens' 1636 version in the Prado. Kenneth Clark considered The Second of May 1808 an "artistic failure ... perhaps he could not shake off the memory of similar compositions by Rubens". Whether or not he had seen copies of The Tiger Hunt and The Battle of the Amazons, at least one original, the painting Henry IV at the Battle of Ivry, was along Goya's Italian itinerary.

== Damage ==
In 1936, during the Spanish Civil War, when Madrid was bombed by Nationalist troops, the republican government decided to evacuate the paintings from the Prado. A truck carrying Goya's paintings had an accident, and The Second of May was badly damaged: there were tears and even pieces missing. A first restoration was carried out in 1941 when the paintings returned to Madrid. A further restoration was completed between 2007 and 2008.
