= Marquise de Créquy =

French woman of letters, salonniére and alleged memoir writer

Renée-Caroline-Victoire de Froulay de Tessé
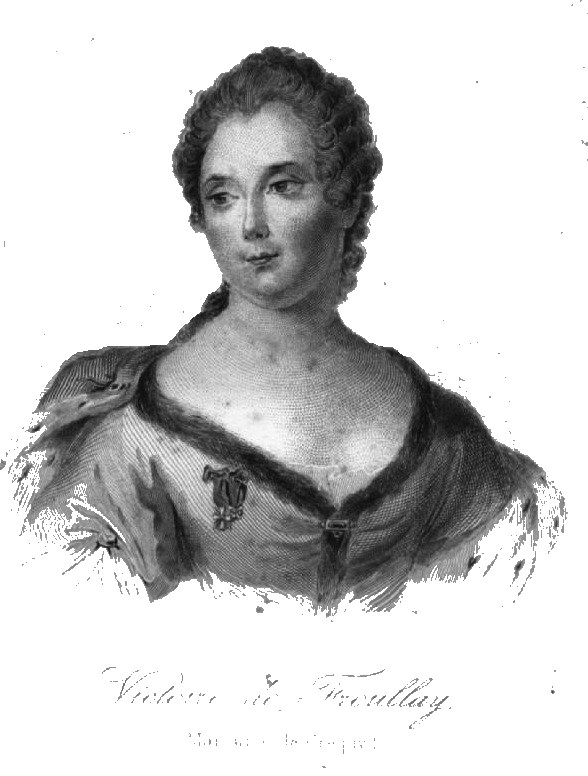
- Victoire, marquise de Créquy
- Born: 1704 or 1714
- Died: 1803
- Occupation: French woman of letters, salonniére, and alleged memoir writer
- Period: 18th century
- Notable works: Souvenirs de la Marquise de Créquy
- Spouse: Louis Marie, Marquis de Créquy (m. 1737)

Renée-Caroline-Victoire de Froulay de Tessé, marquise de Créquy de Heymont de Canaples d'Ambrières (1704 or 1714–1803) was a French woman of letters, salonniére and alleged memoir writer. She was friends with d'Alembert, Rousseau and de Meilhan. The Souvenirs de la Marquise de Créquy is attributed to her but may be by Cousin de Courchamps.

== Biography ==
De Créquy was born on 19 October 1714, at the château of Monfleaux (Mayenne), the daughter of Lieutenant-General Charles François de Froullay. She was educated by her maternal grandmother, and in 1737 married Louis Marie, Marquis de Créquy (1705-1741) — author of the Principes philosophiques des saints solitaires d'Egypte (1779) — who died four years after the marriage.

De Créquy devoted herself to the care of her only son, who rewarded her with an ingratitude which was the chief sorrow of her life. In 1755 she began to receive in Paris, among her intimates being Jean le Rond d'Alembert and Jean-Jacques Rousseau. She had none of the frivolity generally associated with the women of her time and class, and presently became extremely religious with inclinations to Jansenism.

D'Alembert's visits ceased when de Créquy adopted religion, and she was nearly seventy when she formed the great friendship of her life with Sénac de Meilhan, whom she met in 1781, and with whom she carried on a correspondence (edited by Édouard Fournier, with a preface by Sainte-Beuve in 1856). De Créquy commented on and criticized Meilhan's works and helped his reputation.

Although she was arrested, she survived the terror of the Reign of Terror. She was arrested in 1793 and imprisoned in the convent of Les Oiseaux until the fall of Robespierre (July 1794).

== Souvenirs de la marquise de Créquy ==
The well-known Souvenirs de la marquise de Créquy (1710-1803) (a reliable description of the French royal court under Louis XV), printed in 7 volumes, 1834-1835, and purporting to be addressed to her grandson, Tancrède de Créquy, was the production of a Breton adventurer, Cousin de Courchamps. The first two volumes appeared in English in 1834 and were severely criticized in the Quarterly Review.

== God Save the Queen ==
In her Souvenirs, which consists mainly of accurate noble genealogies and court gossip from the reigns of Louis XIV, Louis XV, Louis XVI and Napoleon, there is a tale for which the author of the Souvenirs is the sole authority. This story, widely believed in France, is her statement, with a detailed story to back it up, that Britain's national anthem, "God Save the Queen", was in fact written by Lully and sung by a French girls' school to greet Louis XIV. The French author of Souvenirs further states that the tune was later plagiarized by Handel and sold to the British crown as their anthem.

If it is true, as some have claimed, that the story about the sale of the anthem is actually from a much later tabloid, then this anachronism is a reason why the author of Souvenirs is sometimes placed in the company of forgers, alongside the authors of such works as the Historia Augusta, De Situ Britanniae, and Annio of Viterbo. If, on the other hand, the French tabloids of the 1850s published Madame de Créquy's story based on her memoirs, it's possible she believed the story to be true, or that the story is true.
