= Gennes =

Gennes is the name of several communes in France:

- Gennes, Doubs, in the Doubs département
- Gennes, Maine-et-Loire, in the Maine-et-Loire département
- Gennes-Ivergny, in the Pas-de-Calais département
- Gennes-sur-Glaize, in the Mayenne département
- Gennes-sur-Seiche, in the Ille-et-Vilaine département

== See also ==
- De Gennes
