= Charles Manry =

French composer and choral conductor (1823–1866)

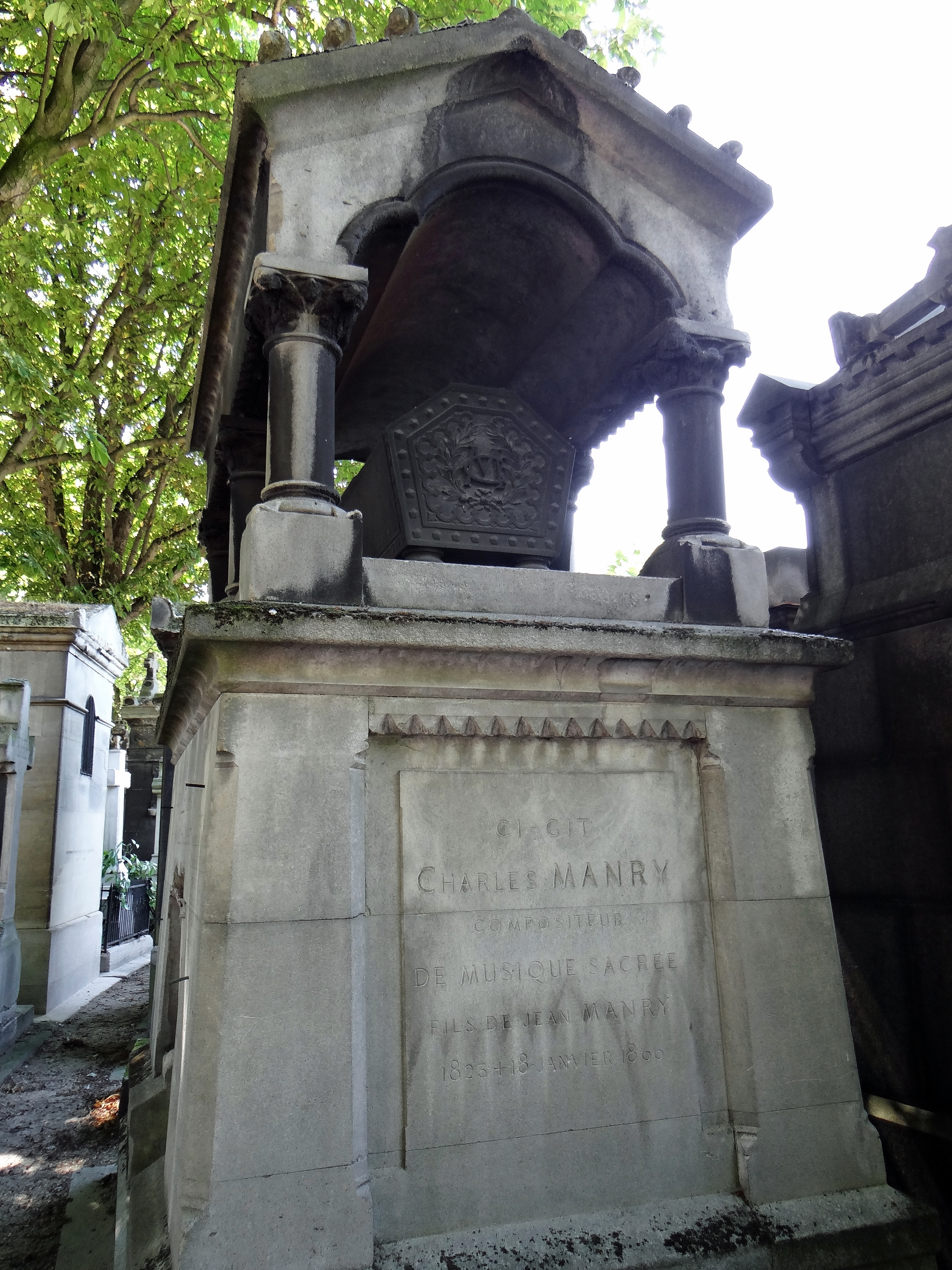
- Charles Manry's grave at Montmartre cemetery
- Born: Charles Casimir Manry; 8 February 1823; Paris
- Died: 18 January 1866 (aged 42); Paris
- Occupation: Composer

Charles Casimir Manry (8 February 1823 – 18 January 1866) was a French composer and choral conductor.

== Life ==
Charles Manry was the son of Jean Manry, a physician at the hôpital Saint-Louis in Paris and a member of the Académie de médecine.

He first studied law and took his legal argument but his fortune enabled him to indulge in his penchant for music. He then studied harmony and counterpoint with Antoine Elwart.

== Music ==
He had his first Mass for three voices with organ accompaniment performed 1 November 1844 at Église Saint-Jacques-du-Haut-Pas.

He later had several pieces of sacred music played in Parisian churches:

- 1852: Mass for four men voices without accompaniment, given at Saint-Philippe-du-Roule, Easter,
- 1854: Les Deux Épagneuls, opéra comique in one act and free verse, text by Édouard Fournier, presented at Néo-Thermes, 19 December
- 1855: Mass for three voices with organ and string instruments accompaniment, given in the same church for Christmas,
- 1860: Mass with full orchestra with soloists and chorus, played at Saint-Roch 1 May,
- Second Mass for three voices with organ accompaniment,
- Te Deum four solo voices and choirs,
- Eight motets for three voices with or without organ accompaniment,
- Several O Salutaris, Ave Maria, Ave verum, Salve Regina and Regina Cœli,
- Symphony for orchestra,
- Three string quartets,
- Trio for violin, alto and cello,
- Sérénade for orchestra,
- La Sorcière des eaux, overture for orchestra,
- Grand duo pour piano et violon, in three parts,
- Les Natchez, oratorio,
- Les Disciples d'Emmaüs, mystery for three voices, chorus and orchestra,

== Bibliography ==
- François-Joseph Fétis, Biographie universelle des musiciens et bibliographie générale de la musique, volume 5 (Paris: Firmin-Didot, 1863), p. 431–432; Read online
- Revue et gazette musicale de Paris, vol. 21 (Paris, 1854), p. 11; Read online)
