= Henri Caspers =

French pianist and composer

Louis Henri Jean Caspers (2 October 1825, Paris – 1906, Paris) was a French pianist and composer.

A student at the Conservatoire de Paris, he composed the music for several shows performed among others on the stages of the Théâtre des Bouffes-Parisiens and the Théâtre Lyrique. He abandoned composition in 1861 to take care of business and did not return before 1892.

== Works ==
- 1842: Hommage à la mémoire de S. A. R. M S.r Le Duc d'Orléans, melody, lyrics by Jules Barbier
- 1848: Prière à la nuit, adagio cantabile for piano
- 1851: Les Cloches du soir, melody, poems by Marceline Desbordes-Valmore
- 1851: Dors-tu Marie ?, melody, lyrics by Charles Dubois de Gennes
- 1851: Fantaisies, valses for piano
- 1856: Le Chapeau du roi, one-act opéra comique, libretto by Édouard Fournier
- 1859: Dans la rue, pochade musicale en un acte, libretto by Charles Henri Ladislas Laurençot
- 1859: La Charmeuse, opéra-comique, libretto by d'Édouard Fournier
- 1859: Les Pêcheurs, four-voice choir
- 1860: Ma Tante dort, opéra comique, libretto by Hector Crémieux
- 1861: Au rendez-vous !, song, lyrics by Charles Lamartinière
- 1892: Blanc et noir, dance for piano
- 1892: Stella, valse for piano

== Bibliography ==
- François Joseph Fétis, François Auguste Arthur P. Pougin, Biographie universelle des musiciens, 1878, p. 159
- John Denison Champlin, William Foster Apthorp, Cyclopedia of Music and Musicians, vol.1, 1888, p. 281
- Albert Ernest Wier, The Macmillan Encyclopedia of Music and Musicians, 1938, p. 300
- Florian Bruyas, Histoire de l'opérette en France, 1855-1965, 1974, p. 55
- T. J. Walsh, Second Empire Opera: The Théâtre Lyrique, Paris 1851-1870, 1981, p. 72, 115, 186
- Robert Ignatius Letellier, The Diaries of Giacomo Meyerbeer: 1791-1839, 1999, p. 111
