= Gabriel Sénac de Meilhan =

French writer

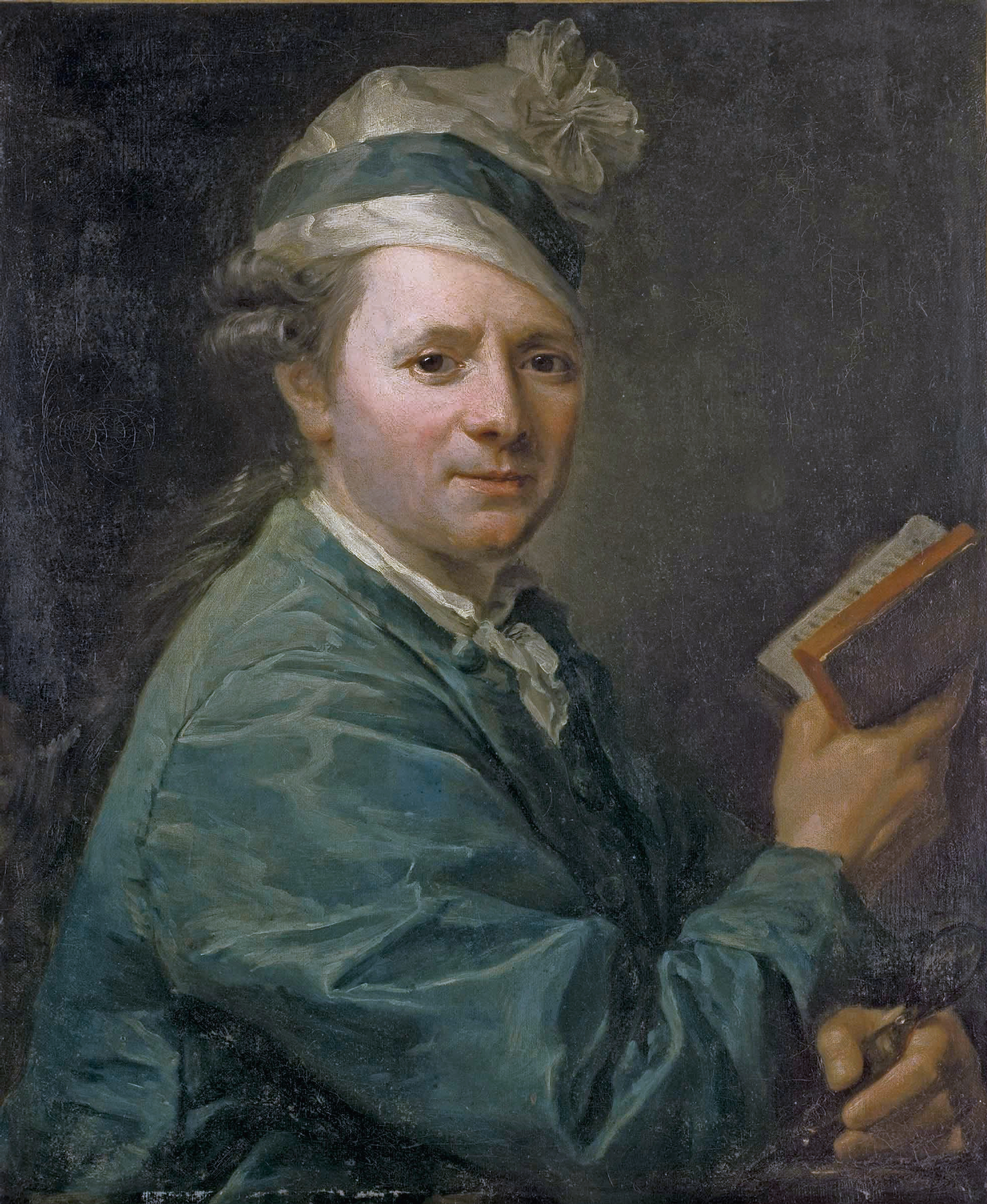
- Gabriel Sénac de Meilhan (ca. 1780)

Gabriel Sénac de Meilhan (May 7, 1736 – August 16, 1803) was a French writer. He witnessed the beginning of the French Revolution in Paris, but soon emigrated in 1790 to London and then to Aachen. He wrote a novel, L'Émigré, in 1793. In 1792 he was invited by Catherine II of Russia to become the imperial historiographer, but Catherine was displeased by his manners and dismissed him.

== Biography ==
Son of Jean-Baptiste de Sénac, physician to Louis XV, he was born in Versailles. He entered the civil service in 1762; two years later he bought the office of master of requests, and in 1766 further advanced his position by a rich marriage. He was successively intendant of La Rochelle, of Aix-en-Provence and of Valenciennes. In 1776 he became intendant-general for war, but was soon compelled to resign.

He had hoped to be made Minister of Finance, and was disappointed by the nomination of Necker, of whom he became a bitter opponent. He was intimate with the comtesse de Tess, sister of the duc de Choiseul, and in 1781 met Madame de Créquy, then sixty-seven years of age, and began a long friendship with her. His first book was the fictitious Mémoires d'Anne de Gonzague, princesse palatine (1786), thought by many people at the time to be genuine. In the next year followed the Considérations sur les richesses et le luxe, combating the opinions of Necker; and in 1788 the more valuable Considérations sur l'esprit et les mœurs, a book which abounds in sententious, but often excessively frank, sayings.

Sénac witnessed the beginnings of the French Revolution in Paris, but emigrated in 1790, making his way first to London, and then, in 1791, to Aachen, where he met Pierre Alexandre de Tilly, who asserts in his Memoirs that Sénac attributed the misfortunes of Louis XVI to the refusal of his own services. In 1793, while his recollections of the Revolution were still fresh, he wrote a novel, L'Émigré (Hamburg, 4 vols., 1797), which shows perspicacity and good judgment in its treatment of events. It was reprinted in 1904 in an abridged form by Casimir Stryienski and Frantz Funck-Brentano.

At the invitation of Catherine II, Sénac went in 1792 to Russia, where he hoped to become imperial historiographer, but his manners displeased Catherine, who contented herself with dismissing him with a pension. From Russia he went to Hamburg and thence to Vienna, where he found a friend in the prince de Ligne. He died in 1803 in Vienna.

== Works ==
Sénac also wrote a moderate exposition of the causes that led to the Revolution, entitled Du gouvernement, des mœurs et des conditions en France avant la Révolution, avec les caractères des principaux personnages du règne de Louis XVI; the last part was reprinted (1813) by the duc de Levis with a notice of the author as Portraits & caractères. Sénac collected his own Œuvres philosophiques & litteraires (2 vols.) at Hamburg in 1795.

See his Œuvres choisies, edited by M. de Lescure in 1862; Lettres inédites de Madame de Créquy a Sénac de Meilhan (1856), edited by Édouard Fournier; Louis Legrand, Sénac de Meilhan & l'intendance du Hainaut & du Cambrsis (1868); and the notice by Fernand Caussy prefixed to his edition (1905) of the Considérations sur l'esprit riles mœurs.
