= Liturgy of state =

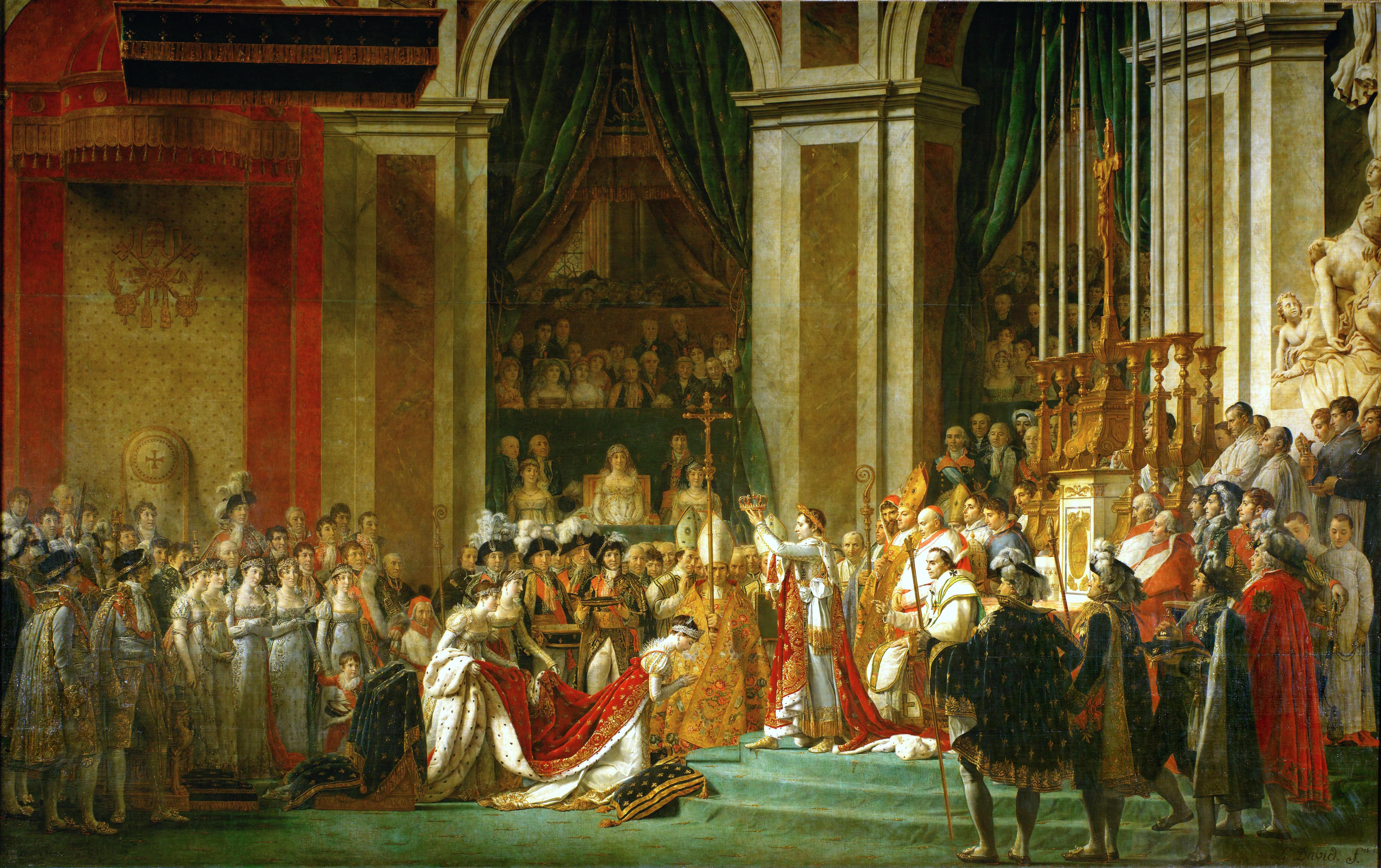
Coronation of Napoleon (Jacques-Louis David, 1808)

The "liturgy of state" is a quasi-religious ceremony intermixing the political and religious aspects of a society (for example, a coronation). This ritual is produced by a three-way partnership between the secular public entity (a "state"), the religious organization(s) ("the Church"), and the person directly concerned (usually the king).

The term was coined by Roy Strong while describing the 16th-century European dynasties appropriating, for their political use, the religious ceremonies.

== Liturgy and state ==
In the original sense, the leitourgia (Greek: λειτουργία) was a collective action, during which the participating group became more than a collection of individuals. The group rituals, through language and gestures, were intended to memorize and induce behavior essential for the preservation of the group, construct its "perceived reality". While the modern Western societies lost the traditional rituals to the spread of individual freedoms, they, in the words of Eric Hobsbawm, employ multiple semi-rituals in the sphere of the public life. Many of the rituals and symbols of the state (flags, images, ceremonies and music) were produced in the 19th-20th centuries with the goal of replacing the loyalties previously owed to a region, ethnic group, class, and church with a newfangled national identity. These rituals constitute a new reality: "[American] criteria for judging and remembering history are liturgical" (Carolyn Marvin, David W. Ingle).

A religious liturgy offers its participants a way to envision world built in a certain way. Similarly, by engaging in the state-sponsored liturgical rituals, citizens see themselves participating in the "drama of the nation" and are able to perform remarkable feats in the real world, like dying and killing during wars.

== History ==
Roy Strong traces the roots of the liturgy of state to court fêtes of Renaissance times. These festivals marked the occasions in the life of the ruler: his birth, marriage, coronation, birth of his kids, military victories, and, ultimately, his death. Many of these occasions were tied to the Church already, so when the newly powerful European dynasties were looking for public state-sponsored events, an extension of the religious dimension of the secular events looked natural. In the 16th-17th centuries, the royal religious celebrations were held in the privacy of the palace chapels, thus the secular courtly behavior was eventually transferred into the sacred space. The monarchs, seeking to expand their image projection, diversified the locations to include other churches and monasteries, usually within the capital.

Liturgies of state became especially prominent in the Protestant countries, where the rituals of the Catholic mass and saints' days were banished by the Reformation. As a result, Englishmen started to celebrate the Guy Fawkes Night, a state festival decreed by the parliament. A less wholesome example of quasi-religious state ritual was provided by the auto-da-fé in Spain.

A Papal Mass was also used as a model for the liturgy of state.

The rituals of liturgies of state in France and Spain evolved under consideration of the locations where the ritual was performed and the monarchical interpretation of God as a sovereign of a Heavenly Court with its own Royal Chapel. The original ceremonies were planned for Royal Chapels and were thus modeled on the liturgies in the Papal Chapel in Rome. As the celebrations in the 18th century expanded into cathedrals, new participants were introduced (for example, a larger choir), necessitating in turn the construction of additional space in the chapels. In the second half of the 18th century, the liturgies of state in Madrid and Versailles were a mix of the cathedral and chapel models.

Dedicated masters of ceremonies performed difficult tasks of modifying the ecclesiastical ceremony to make the monarch the main actor of the liturgy without violating the strict liturgical framework imposed by the Holy See.

Arnaud Join-Lambert argues that the coronation of Napoleon (2 December 1804) was a major turning point in the evolution in state rituals of modernity, a defining form of the liturgy of state. Sensing the desire of the French nation to have its own George Washington and responding to his own need to be crowned, Napoleon and the Council of State paid great attention to the details. The bipolarity of the secular and religious domains was made clear through dividing Notre Dame de Paris in two, with the papal throne in the choir and emperor's throne at the top of a staircase in the nave, taking ot the limit the two-throne arrangement in the Reims Cathedral for the previous French coronations. The crowd was also decidedly mixed (for example, Joseph Fouché, who spearheded the persecution of the clergy in the French Republic, was in attendance). Per Join-Lambert, this coronation for France was a mid-point between the Christendom and the modernity: the liturgy was preserved, but Napoleon had crowned himself (following the Carolingian rite), the Pope was presiding, but withdrew to the sacristy during the secular oath.

== Modernity ==
William Cavanaugh notes that modern states effectively compete with the Church on the religious ground. For example, the states mostly replaced the religion when handling death and established the new type of salvation through sacrifice of life on behalf of the nation, with corresponding liturgical rituals centered around the flag. Francis Bellamy, the author of the Pledge of Allegiance, had directly compared its role in schools to the Lord's Prayer.

In 1996, the funeral arrangements of the French president François Mitterrand (who made himself known as an agnostic) were marked by a significant role of traditional religion. In his will, Mitterrand stated, "Une messe dans l'eglise de Jarnac est possible" ("A mass at the church at Jarnac is possible"). As a result, unprecedented two masses were celebrated: one private at Jarnac, one at Notre Dame de Paris by Cardinal Lustiger and nine bishops.

== Sources ==
- Cavanaugh, William T. (2005). "The Liturgies of Church and State". Liturgy. 20 (1): 25–30. doi:10.1080/04580630590522876. ISSN 0458-063X.
- Hobsbawm, Eric (2012-03-26). "Introduction: Inventing Traditions". The Invention of Tradition (PDF). Cambridge University Press. pp. 1–14. doi:10.1017/cbo9781107295636.001. ISBN 978-1-107-60467-4.
- Join-Lambert, Arnaud (2008). "Mutations in France's "Liturgies of State": From the Coronation of Napoleon to the Funeral(s) of Mitterrand". Studia Liturgica. 38 (1): 95–113. doi:10.1177/003932070803800107. ISSN 0039-3207.
- López Morillo, Luis (2019). Les Bourbons sacrés: Musica sacra y liturgia de Estado en las cortes de Roma, Madrid y Versalles (1745-1789) (PDF) (PhD thesis) (in Spanish). Universidad de La Rioja.
- Marvin, Carolyn; Ingle, David W. (1999-02-28). Blood Sacrifice and the Nation. Cambridge, U.K.; New York: Cambridge University Press. ISBN 978-0-521-62345-2.
- McBurney, Erin (2014). Art and Power in the Reign of Catherine the Great: The State Portraits (Doctor of Philosophy thesis). Columbia University. doi:10.7916/D88W3MP1.
- Strong, Roy C. (1973). Splendor at Court: Renaissance spectacle and the theater of power. Boston, Mass: Houghton Mifflin. ISBN 978-0-395-17220-9.
