= Henry IV at the Battle of Ivry =

1627 painting by Peter Paul Rubens

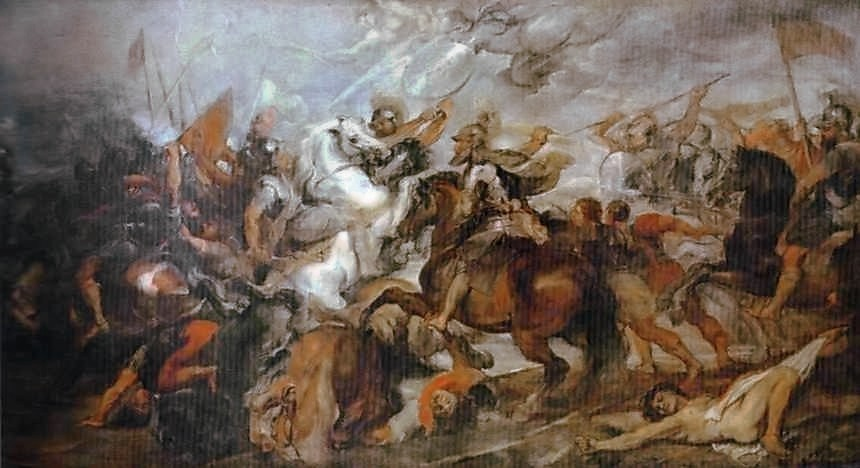
Henry IV at the Battle of Ivry (1627) by Rubens

Henry IV at the Battle of Ivry is a 1627 oil on canvas by the artist Peter Paul Rubens, measuring 367 by 693 cm. It shows Henry IV of France at Ivry and forms a pair with The Triumphal Entry of Henry IV into Paris. Both paintings were bought by Cosimo III de' Medici in 1686. They have been in the Uffizi Gallery in Florence since 1773.
