= Charles Dubois de Gennes =

French writer and journalist (1814–1876)

- Born: Jean Charles Louis Dubois de Gennes; 15 April 1814; Dumfries (Scotland)
- Died: 15 May 1876 (aged 62); Paris
- Occupations: Writer; Journalist

Jean Charles Louis Dubois de Gennes (15 April 1814 – 15 May 1876) was a 19th-century French writer, journalist, and chansonnier (singer-songwriter).

A former military man and member of the Société du Caveau, as well as a collaborator of the Almanach pour rire, he is remembered for his correspondence with Victor Hugo.

He also published under the pseudonym Claudius Transiens.

== Works ==
- 1851: Dors-tu Marie ?, melody by Henri Caspers
- 1862: Le Troupier tel qu'il est à cheval
- 1865: Les Envieux
- 1867: La Huronne, scènes de la vie canadienne, by Émile Chevalier (preface)
- 1869: Sous le casque, rimes à la dragonne, with Victor Hugo (letter)
- 1874: Chasse aux femmes et aux lions en Algérie

== Bibliography ==
- Joseph-Marie Quérard, Les supercheries littéraires dévoilées, 1882, (p. 993)
- Henri Frotier de La Messelière, Filiations bretonnes. 1650-1912, vol.6, 1976, (p. 159)
