= Jean-Baptiste de Sénac =

French physician (1693-1770)

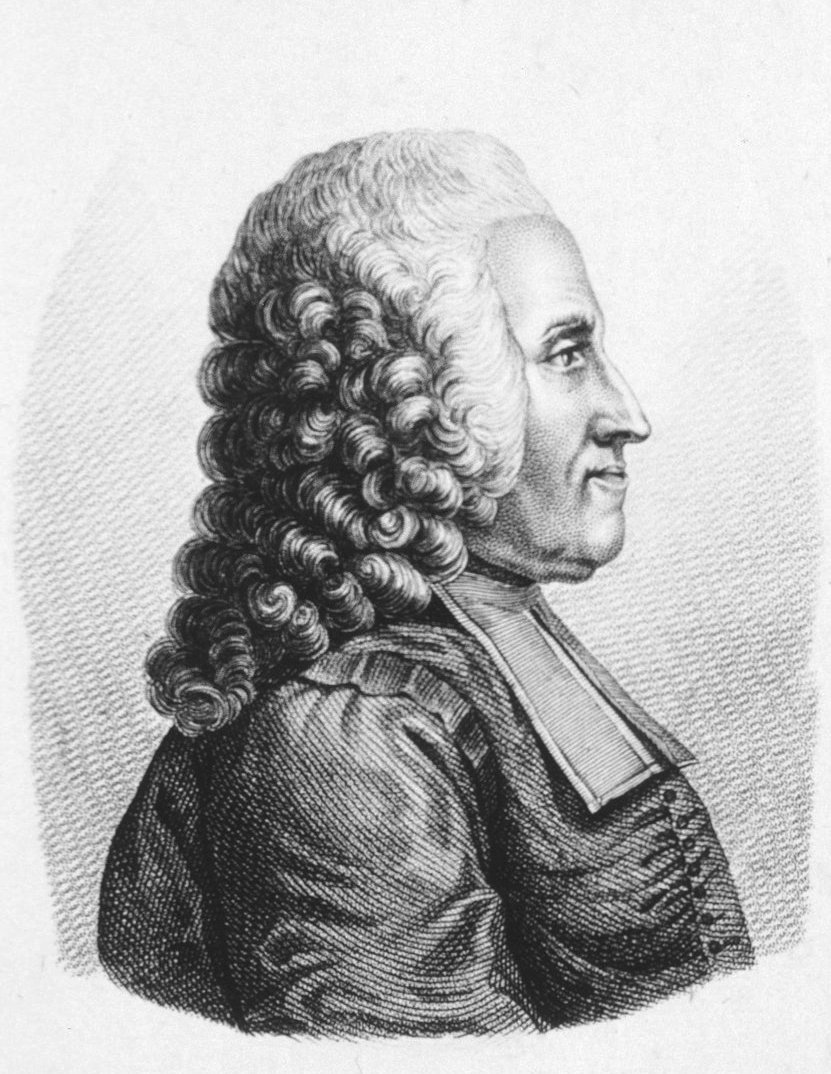
- Jean-Baptiste de Sénac
- Born: 1693; Gascony, France
- Died: December 22, 1770 (aged 76–77)

Jean-Baptiste de Sénac (1693–1770) was a French physician, born in the district of Lombez in Gascony, France.

== Early life and education ==
Details of Sénac's early life are sketchy. It is generally thought that he studied medicine at the University of Leiden, the Netherlands. He later studied in London, England, where one of his instructors was John Freind (1675–1728). Beginning in 1723, Sénac practiced medicine in Paris, serving (from 1752 to 1770) as a personal physician to King Louis XV.

== Contributions to medicine ==
Sénac is remembered for important studies of the heart in an era when cardiological medicine was rudimentary. In 1749 he published a book on cardiology called Traité de la structure du coeur, de son action, et de ses maladies (Treatise on the structure of the heart, its action, and its diseases), an influential work that systematically dealt with physiological, anatomical and pathological issues involving the heart. In the treatise, he discusses heart disorders and diseases that he analyzed personally, as well as diagnoses that were determined by other physicians.

Many of Sénac's discoveries were derived from autopsies. He was the first physician to describe the correlation between atrial fibrillation and mitral valve disease, as well as the first to provide a comprehensive study of cardiac hypertrophy. He also conducted research of cinchona extract and rhubarb as possible treatments for cardiac irregularities.

Gabriel Sénac de Meilhan was his son.
