= The Triumphal Entry of Henry IV into Paris =

Painting by Peter Paul Rubens

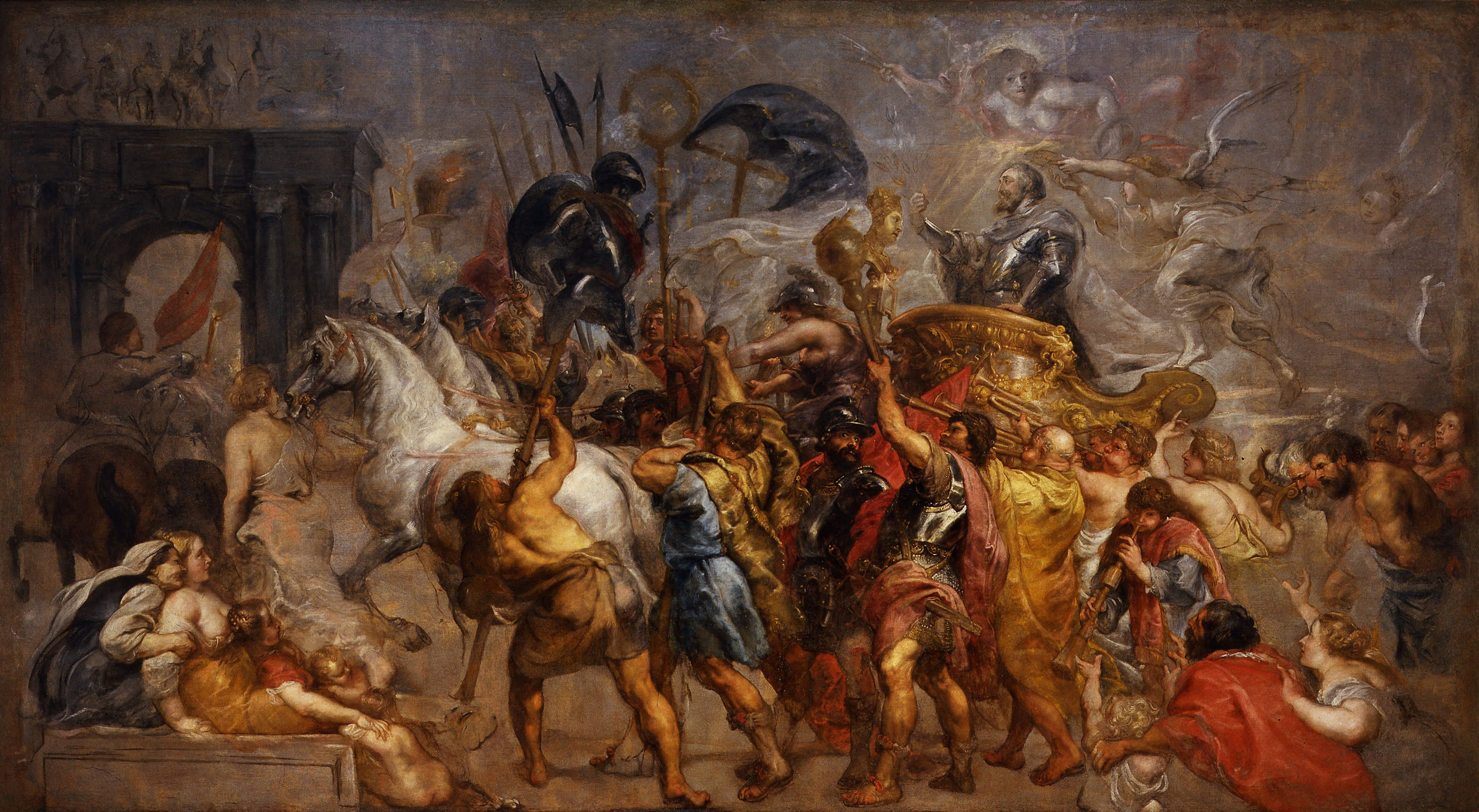
The Triumphal Entry of Henry IV into Paris (1627) by Rubens

The Triumphal Entry of Henry IV into Paris is a 1627 oil on canvas by the artist Peter Paul Rubens, measuring 367 by 693 cm. It shows Henry IV of France's entry into Paris in 1594. It forms a pair with Henry IV at the Battle of Ivry - both were bought by Cosimo III de' Medici in 1686. They are both now in the Uffizi Gallery in Florence, where they have been since 1773.

== See also ==
- Entry of Henry IV into Paris, an 1817 painting by François Gérard
