= Réjane Sénac =

French political scientist (born 1975)

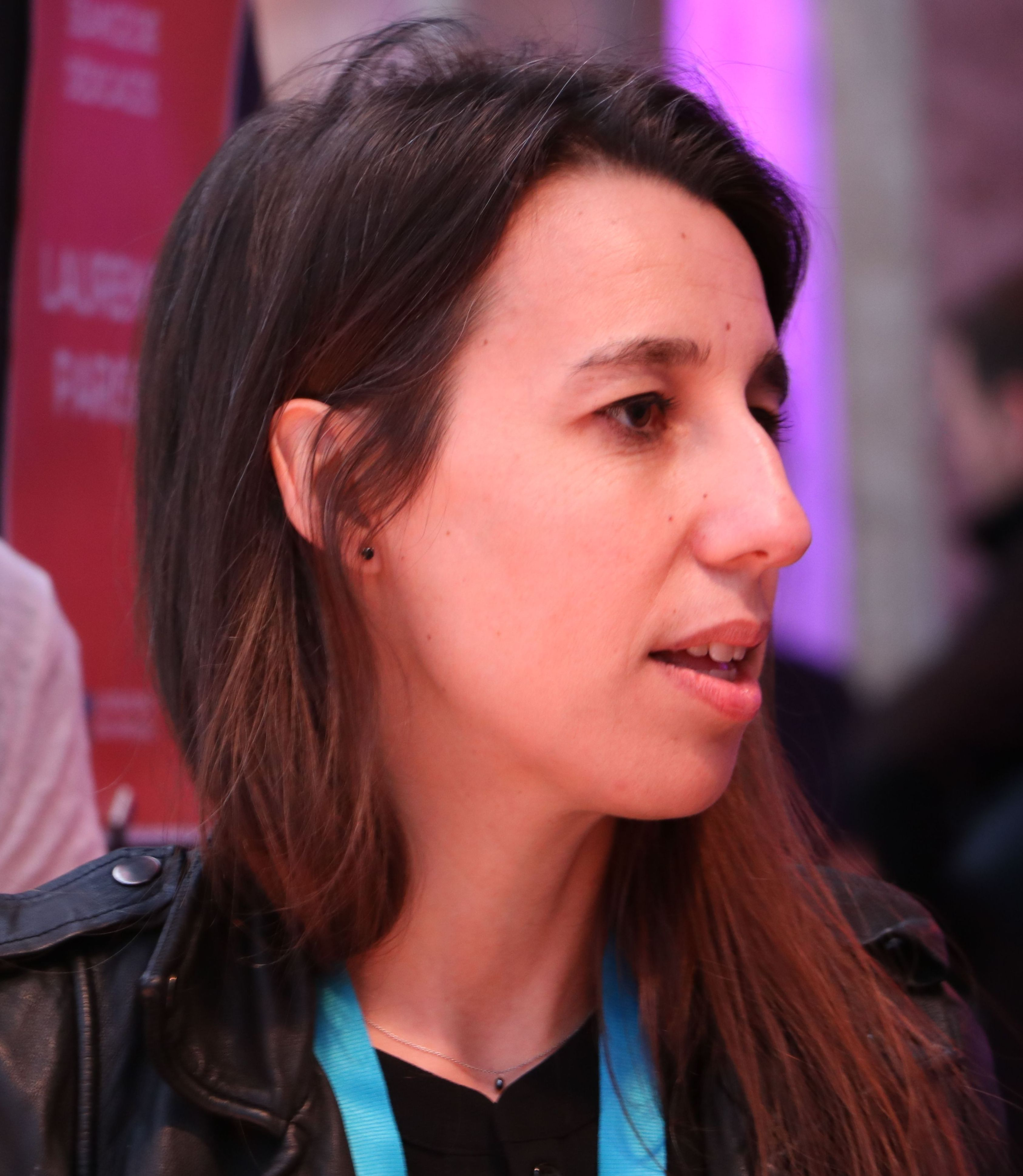
- Réjane Sénac in 2017
- Education: University of Paris 1 Pantheon-Sorbonne; Sciences Po
- Scientific career
- Fields: Political science
- Workplaces: French National Centre for Scientific Research
- Doctoral advisor: Marc Sadoun

Réjane Sénac (born 1975) is a French political scientist. She specialises in gender equality in recent French history and politics, as well as the politics of discrimination and diversity. She is the Director of Research at the French National Centre for Scientific Research in the Centre de recherches politiques (fr) of Sciences Po. She was president of the parity commission of the French High Council for Equality between Women and Men (fr), which was an independent national advisory body under the Prime Minister of France from January 2013 to January 2019.

== Education and career ==
Sénac graduated from Sciences Po Paris in 2004 with a doctorate in political science. Her dissertation was entitled Identités sexuées et altérité démocratique: les représentations des différences hommes-femmes dans la société française aujourd'hui. Sénac also holds a post-graduate diploma in law and a master's degree in philosophy from The University of Paris 1 Pantheon-Sorbonne.

Sénac is the Director of Research at the French National Centre for Scientific Research within Sciences Po, and she is a member of the steering committee of PRESAGE (which stands for programme de recherche et d'enseignement des savoirs sur le genre, or the Gender Research and Teaching Program). She is also a member of the scientific council of La Cité du Genre, which is a gender studies research network that spans Université Sorbonne Paris Nord, Paris Descartes University, Paris Diderot University, University of Sorbonne Nouvelle Paris 3, and Sciences Po.

Sénac has written about the problematic implications of the French republican ethos expressed by the motto Liberté, égalité, fraternité. In her 2015 work l'Egalité sous conditions (Conditional equality), Sénac argues that women were included in the republican pact (via parity in particular) by virtue only of their differences from men, and were viewed as complementary but dissimilar entities to the default of men. Sénac's 2017 work Non-Frères au pays de l’égalité (Non-brothers in the country of equality) develops a notion of Republican "non-brothers": those who were excluded from the French Republic's original definition of citizenship, including women, people who are not white, people who are not heterosexual, intersex people, and gender nonbinary people. Sénac argues that the French Revolution established political citizenship by excluding certain groups from the social contract, and she then traces how these excluded "non-brothers" were progressively accepted, not because of their similarity to enfranchised citizens or any recognition of inherent rights, but rather through the prevailing norm of their complementarity to those already enfranchised. Consequently, Sénac argues, the Revolution's famed declaration of "liberty and equality for all" actually laid the groundwork for a deeply unequal Republican France.

She has analysed the historical justifications for the public promotion of parity and diversity in French society in terms of the original call to extend liberty and equality exactly to those people who were members of the political fraternity, not necessarily to any others.

Sénac's work has been cited in media outlets like 20 minutes, Slate, Forbes, and Le Monde.

== Selected works ==
- L'ordre sexué: la perception des inégalités femmes-hommes (2007)
- La parité (2008)
- L'invention de la diversité (2012)
- L'égalité sous conditions: genre, parité, diversité (2015)
- Les non-frères au pays de l'égalité (2017)
- Global Perspectives on Same-Sex Marriage, A neo-Institutional Approach, co-editor (2018)
- L'égalité sans condition: Osons nous imaginer et être semblables (2019)
- Par effraction. Rendre visible la question animale (2025)
