= Adolphe Bitard =

French journalist and scientific educator (1826–1888)

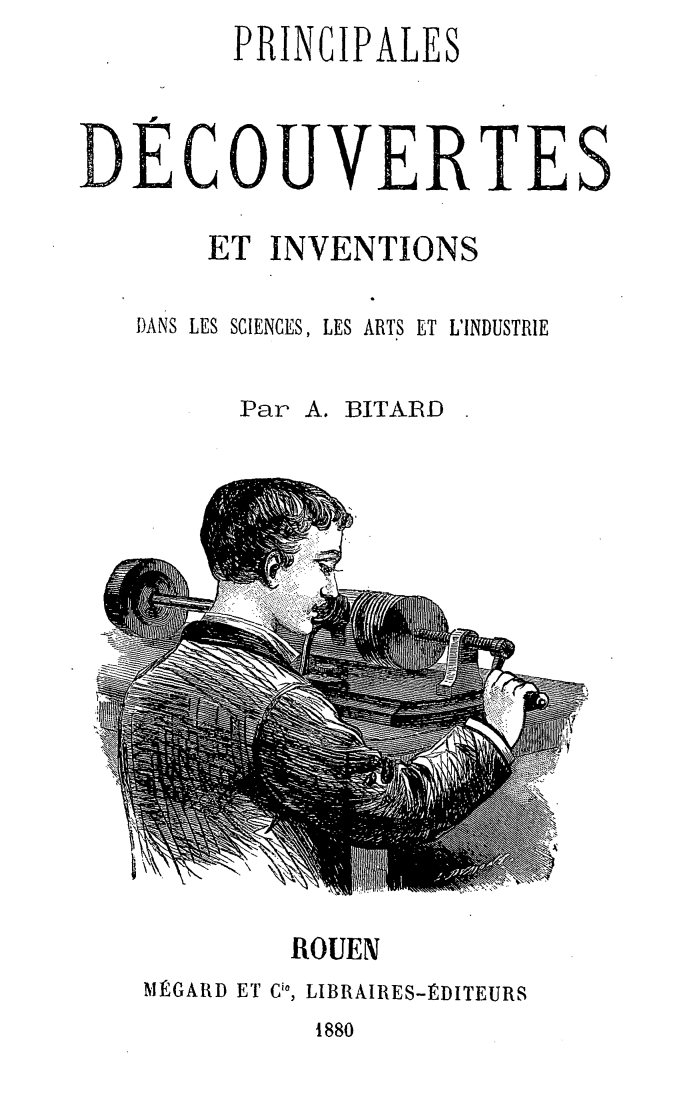
The phonograph. Frontispice des Principales Découvertes et Inventions par Adolphe Bitard (1880).

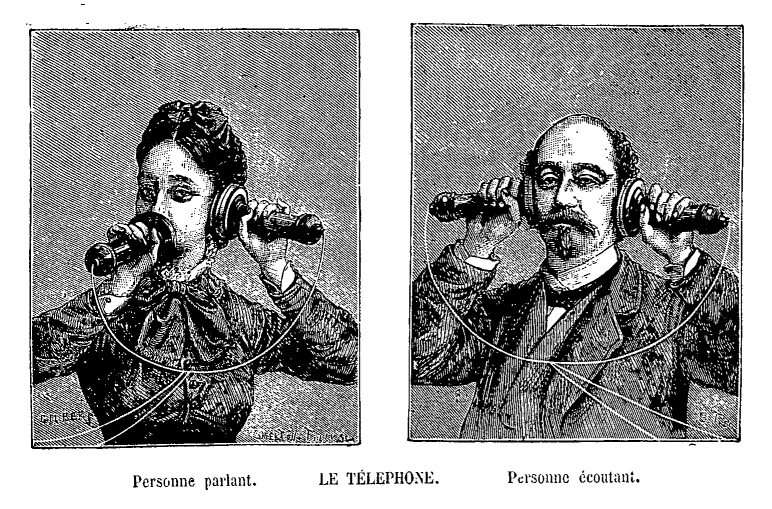
The telephone: Personne parlant et personne écoutant.

Adolphe-Louis-Émile Bitard (24 February 1826 – early 1888) was a 19th-century French journalist and scientific educator.

From age 17, he enlisted in the campaigns of Crimea and Italy. After the loi sur la presse de 1868 was voted, Bitard participated to several Parisian dailies, and then, from 1871, to science magazines such as La Revue de France, Le Musée universel and La Science illustrée which he established some weeks before he died. He created two other magazines, L'Exposition de Paris in 1878, and L'Enseignement populaire in 1881, then La Science illustrée in 1887. In addition to popular science books, he left a biographical dictionary and several practical encyclopedias.

== Main publications ==
- 1875: Encyclopédie universelle des connaissances pratiques, comprenant des renseignements sur tous les sujets usuels, ouvrage indispensable aux familles, rédigé par A. Bitard, avec le concours de savants et d'hommes spéciaux
- 1878: Dictionnaire général de biographie contemporaine française et étrangère, contenant les noms et pseudonymes de tous les personnages célèbres du temps présent, l'histoire de leur vie, de leurs actes et de leurs œuvres, ainsi que la date des principaux événements de leur carrière, etc., etc.,Text online
- 1878: Guide pratique dans Paris pendant l'Exposition
- 1878: L'Exposition de Paris rédigée par A. Bitard avec la collaboration d'écrivains spéciaux. Édition enrichie de vues, de scènes, de reproductions d'objets d'art, de machines, de dessins et gravures par les meilleurs artistes
- 1878: Le Monde des merveilles. Tableau pittoresque des grands phénomènes de la nature et des manifestations du génie de l'homme dans les sciences, l'industrie et les arts
- 1878: Le Livre de la maison, comprenant des renseignements sur tous les sujets usuels). Reissue: Le Livre de la maîtresse de maison et de la mère de famille, ouvrage contenant tous les renseignements indispensables à la vie pratique, 1880.
- 1878: Les Plaisirs, les jeux et les récréations de la maison, Text online
- 1880: Principales découvertes et inventions dans les sciences, les arts et l'industrie, Text online
- 1880: Les Phénomènes de la nature. Principaux produits du sol et du fond des mers
- 1880: Les Races humaines et les grandes explorations du globe
- 1881: Histoire des expositions et des beaux-arts, par A. Bitard. Ouvrage entièrement revu et corrigé par H. Haraucourt
- 1884: Le Grand Dictionnaire illustré de la langue française littéraire usuelle et fantaisiste, avec les règles grammaticales, la prononciation figurée, les étymologies, synonymies, etc., de la littérature et de l'histoire générales, des sciences pures et appliquées depuis les temps les plus reculés
- 1886: Curiosités du monde des insectes
- 1891: Éducation des sourds-muets.

== Sources ==
- Catherine Benedic, "Le Monde des vulgarisateurs", La science pour tous, sur la vulgarisation scientifique en France de 1850 à 1914, Paris, Bibliothèque du conservatoire national des arts et métiers, 1990, (p. 41).
