= Les Caquets de l'accouchée =

1622 French satirical book

Les Caquets de l'accouchée is an anonymous French satire composed of several quires published in 1622. They were reunited in 1623 under the title « Recueil général des Caquets de l'Accouchée ».

The title refers to the custom, documented by the middle of the fifteenth, of Parisian bourgeoises to visit when one of them was in childbirth.

The narrator introduces himself as a convalescing Parisian to whom a doctor has prescribed to recuperate through entertainment and goes rue Quincampoix to listen to gossip with her cousin who has just given birth.

According to Antoine Le Roux de Lincy, this book, which details various aspects of Parisian life and specifically quotes the personalities of the time covering topics such as politics and religion can be "now classified as historical works, faithful echoes of prejudices and opinions of a period".

== Bibliography ==
Antoine Le Roux de Lincy (1855). "Introduction". Les Caquets de l'accouchée. Paris: P. Jannet. p. v-xxxii.

- (in French) Les Caquets de l’Accouchée on wikisource
