= Nashville discography =

This is the discography of the American musical drama television series Nashville (2012-2018) by Academy Award-winning screenwriter Callie Khouri and starring Connie Britton as "Rayna Jaymes" and Hayden Panettiere as "Juliette Barnes." The drama depicts an inter-related group of vocalists, songwriters, and music industry members who live in Nashville, Tennessee. All of the actors who portray singing characters perform their own vocals in the series.

In addition to Britton and Panettiere, other cast members who perform songs in the series include: Clare Bowen as "Scarlett O'Connor," Sam Palladio as "Gunnar Scott," Jonathan Jackson as "Avery Barkley," Charles Esten as "Deacon Claybourne," real-life sisters Lennon and Maisy Stella as "Maddie Conrad" and "Daphne Conrad," Chris Carmack as "Will Lexington," Will Chase as "Luke Wheeler," and Aubrey Peeples as "Layla Grant." Many recurring or guest cast members also provide vocals.

The Nashville music track lists performers under a group listing of "Nashville Cast", with the actors performing vocals co-listed with "Nashville Cast" on the track listing. Some songs are performed by multiple actors (i.e., "Love Like Mine", "Telescope") and are differentiated by which actor performs on the track. Additionally, there are versions designated as radio mixes, Alternate Versions, and Acoustic Versions for some songs. There is one song, "Fame," sung by Hayden Panettiere, which did not appear in an episode, or on an album, but was aired during The Oscars as a full-length music video to promote the show and then later released as a digital download. Similarly, none of the songs which are heard on the album Christmas with Nashville appear on the series (with the exception of "Baby, It's Cold Outside" as sung by Connie Britton and Will Chase).

For the first season, "Midas touch" producer T-Bone Burnett, Khouri's husband, was Executive Music Producer and shared scoring duties with Keefus Green. Burnett was heavily involved in the production of songs for the show.

Starting with the second season, Executive Music Producer duties were performed by singer-songwriter Buddy Miller, who assisted Burnett during the first season. W. G. Snuffy Walden took over the duties of episodic scoring, with additional music by A. Patrick Rose; the two composers share "music by" credit from "They Don't Make 'Em Like My Daddy Anymore" onwards, with Will Walden providing additional music beginning with "She's Got You."

Unique to the show is the music supervision and curation that connects the TV show with the authentic, rich singer-songwriter country music community, which is localized in Nashville where the show is shot.

== Albums ==
=== Soundtrack albums ===
Title	Album details	Peak chart positions				Sales
Title	Album details	UK Compilations	US	US Country	US Soundtracks	U.S. Sales
The Music of Nashville: Season 1, Volume 1	Released: December 11, 2012 (USA); Released: February 25, 2013 (UK); Label: Big Machine Records; Format: CD, digital download	5	14	3	1	171,000
The Music of Nashville: Season 1, Volume 2	Released: May 7, 2013 (USA); Released: May 20, 2013 (UK); Label: Big Machine Records; Format: CD, digital download	9	13	5	2	186,000
The Music of Nashville, Season 1: The Complete Collection	Released: September 23, 2013 (UK); Label: Decca/Big Machine Records; Format: CD, digital download	—	—	—	—	
The Music of Nashville: Season 2, Volume 1	Released: December 10, 2013 (USA); Released: February 17, 2014 (UK); Label: Big Machine Records; Format: CD, digital download	—	34	7	4	18,000
Nashville: On the Record	Released: April 22, 2014 (USA); Label: Big Machine Records; Format: digital download	—	8	2	—	
Nashville: The Nashville Cast featuring Clare Bowen, Season 1	Released: April 22, 2014 (USA); Label: Big Machine Records; Format: digital download	—	—	41	17	
Nashville: The Nashville Cast featuring Hayden Panettiere, Season 1	Released: April 29, 2014 (USA); Label: Big Machine Records; Format: digital download	—	—	—	—	
The Music of Nashville: Season 2, Volume 2	Released: May 6, 2014 (USA); Label: Big Machine Records; Format: CD, digital download	—	13	4	2	573,000
Nashville: The Nashville Cast featuring Hayden Panettiere, Season 2	Released: May 13, 2014 (USA); Label: Big Machine Records; Format: digital download	—	—	—	—	
Nashville: The Nashville Cast featuring Clare Bowen, Season 2	Released: May 13, 2014 (USA); Label: Big Machine Records; Format: digital download	—	—	—	—	
Christmas with Nashville	Released: November 4, 2014 (USA); Released: November 24, 2014 (UK); Label: Big Machine Records; Format: CD, digital download	—	59	8	—	
The Music of Nashville: Season 3, Volume 1	Released: December 9, 2014 (USA); Released: April 20, 2015 (UK); Label: Big Machine Records; Format: CD, digital download	—	75	10	6	
Nashville: On the Record, Volume 2	Released: March 23, 2015 (USA); Label: Big Machine Records; Format: CD, digital download	—	31	3	—	12,200
The Music of Nashville: Season 3, Volume 2	Released: May 12, 2015 (USA); Released: June 29, 2015 (UK); Label: Big Machine Records; Format: CD, digital download	—	28	3	3	
The Music of Nashville: Season 4, Volume 1	Released: December 4, 2015 (USA); Label: Big Machine Records; Format: CD, digital download	—	170	17	6	
Nashville: On the Record, Volume 3	Released: December 16, 2015 (USA); Label: Big Machine Records; Format: CD, digital download	—	—	—	—	
The Music of Nashville: Season 4, Volume 2	Released: May 13, 2016; Label: Big Machine Records; Format: CD, digital download	—	165	12	3	3,700
The Music of Nashville: Season 5, Volume 1	Released: March 10, 2017 (USA); Label: Big Machine Records; Format: CD, digital download	—	65	12	8	5,200
The Music of Nashville: Season 5, Volume 2	Released: June 1, 2017 (USA); Label: Big Machine Records; Format: CD, digital download					
The Music of Nashville: Season 5, Volume 3	Released: August 10, 2017 (USA); Label: Big Machine Records; Format: CD, digital download	51				
The Music of Nashville: Greatest Hits, Seasons 1–5	Released: October 6, 2017 (UK); Label: Big Machine Records; Format: CD, digital download	19				
The Music of Nashville: Season 6, Volume 1	Released: February 23, 2018; Label: Big Machine Records, Universal; Format: CD, Digital download	—	—	—	—	800
The Music of Nashville: Season 6, Volume 2	Released: July 27, 2018; Label: Big Machine Records, Universal; Format: CD, Digital download	—	—	—	—	
The Best of Nashville	Released: November 2, 2018; Label: Big Machine Records; Format: Vinyl, Digital download	—	—	—	—	
The Complete Score	Released: November 2, 2018; Label: Big Machine Records; Format: Digital download	—	—	—	—	
Lennon Stella as Maddie Conrad	Released: April 3, 2020; Label: Big Machine Records; Format: Digital download	—	—	—	—	
"—" denotes releases that did not chart

=== Extended plays ===
Title	Extended play details	Peak chart positions			
Title	Extended play details	UK Compilations	US	US Country	US Soundtracks
Nashville, Season 6: Episode 1	Released: January 5, 2018; Label: Big Machine Records; Format: Digital download	—	—	—	—
Nashville, Season 6: Episode 2	Released: January 11, 2018; Label: Big Machine Records; Format: Digital download	—	—	—	—
Nashville, Season 6: Episode 3	Released: January 18, 2018; Label: Big Machine Records; Format: Digital download	—	—	—	—
Nashville, Season 6: Episode 4	Released: January 25, 2018; Label: Big Machine Records; Format: Digital download	—	—	—	—
Nashville, Season 6: Episode 5	Released: February 1, 2018; Label: Big Machine Records; Format: Digital download	—	—	—	—
Nashville, Season 6: Episode 6	Released: February 8, 2018; Label: Big Machine Records; Format: Digital download	—	—	—	—
Nashville, Season 6: Episode 7	Released: February 15, 2018; Label: Big Machine Records; Format: Digital download	—	—	—	—
Nashville, Season 6: Episode 8	Released: February 22, 2018; Label: Big Machine Records; Format: Digital download	—	—	—	—
Nashville, Season 6: Episode 9	Released: June 7, 2018; Label: Big Machine Records; Format: Digital download	—	—	—	—
Nashville, Season 6: Episode 10	Released: June 14, 2018; Label: Big Machine Records; Format: Digital download	—	—	—	—
Nashville, Season 6: Episode 11	Released: June 21, 2018; Label: Big Machine Records; Format: Digital download	—	—	—	—
Nashville, Season 6: Episode 12	Released: June 28, 2018; Label: Big Machine Records; Format: Digital download	—	—	—	—
Nashville, Season 6: Episode 13	Released: July 5, 2018; Label: Big Machine Records; Format: Digital download	—	—	—	—
Nashville, Season 6: Episode 14	Released: July 12, 2018; Label: Big Machine Records; Format: Digital download	—	—	—	—
Nashville, Season 6: Episode 15	Released: July 19, 2018; Label: Big Machine Records; Format: Digital download	—	—	—	—
Nashville, Season 6: Episode 16	Released: July 26, 2018; Label: Big Machine Records; Format: Digital download	—	—	—	—
"—" denotes releases that did not chart

== Singles and songs ==
=== Season One ===
List of songs in Nashville season one
Title	Written by	Performed by	Episode	Single	Album	Ref
"Back Home"	Kyle Jacobs, Lee Brice and Joy Williams	Deacon Claybourne	1-1. "Pilot"	Yes	The Music of Nashville, Season 1: The Complete Collection	
"It's My Life"	Bob DiPiero and Sarah Buxton	Rayna Jaymes	1-1. "Pilot"; 1-13. "There'll Be No Teardrops Tonight"; 1-20. "A Picture from Life's Other Side"; 2-17. "We've Got Things To Do"	Yes	The Music of Nashville, Season 1: The Complete Collection	
"Boys and Buses"	Shane McAnally, Brandy Clark and Josh Osborne	Juliette Barnes	1-1. "Pilot"; 1-9. "Be Careful of Stones That You Throw"; 1-10. "I'm Sorry for You My Friend"	Yes	The Music of Nashville, Season 1: The Complete Collection	
"If I Didn't Know Better" (Original, Radio Mix, On the Record Version)	John Paul White and Arum Rae	Scarlett O'Connor and Gunnar Scott	1-1. "Pilot"; 1-3. "Someday You'll Call My Name"; 4-17. "Baby Come Home"	Yes	The Music of Nashville: Season 1, Volume 1	
"Love Like Mine"	Kelly Archer, Justin Weaver and Emily Shackelton	Juliette Barnes	1-1. "Pilot"; 1-10. "I'm Sorry for You My Friend"	Yes	The Music of Nashville: Season 1, Volume 1	
"Love Like Mine"	Kelly Archer, Justin Weaver and Emily Shackelton	Juliette Barnes and Sean Butler	1-6. "You're Gonna Change (Or I'm Gonna Leave)"	No	—N/a	
"Love Like Mine"	Kelly Archer, Justin Weaver and Emily Shackelton	Deacon Claybourne	1-15. "When You're Tired of Breaking Other Hearts"	No	—N/a	
"Already Gone"	Kyle Jacobs, Ben Glover and Joy Williams	Rayna Jaymes	1-1. "Pilot"; 1-12. "I've Been Down That Road Before"; 1-15. "When You're Tired of Breaking Other Hearts"; 2-17. "We've Got Things To Do"; 5-1. "The Wayfaring Stranger"	Yes	—N/a	
"I'll Be There (If You Want Me)"	Ray Price and Rusty Gabbard	Gunnar Scott	1-2. "I Can't Help It (If I'm Still in Love With You)"	No	The Music of Nashville: Season 1, Volume 1 (Deluxe Edition)	
"No One Will Ever Love You"	Steve McEwan and John Paul White	Rayna Jaymes and Deacon Claybourne	1-2. "I Can't Help It (If I'm Still in Love With You)"; 3-12. "I've Got Reasons to Hate You"	Yes	The Music of Nashville: Season 1, Volume 1	
"Undermine" (and Acoustic Version)	Trent Dabbs and Kacey Musgraves	Juliette Barnes and Deacon Claybourne	1-2. "I Can't Help It (If I'm Still in Love With You)"; 1-3. "Someday You'll Call My Name"	Yes	The Music of Nashville: Season 1, Volume 1	
"Telescope" (Original, Radio Mix, and Live from Nashville)	Hillary Lindsey and Cary Barlowe	Juliette Barnes	1-2. "I Can't Help It (If I'm Still in Love With You)"; 1-3. "Someday You'll Call My Name"; 1-10. "I'm Sorry For You My Friend"; 1-11. "You Win Again"; 1-12. "I've Been Down That Road Before"	Yes	The Music of Nashville: Season 1, Volume 1	
"Telescope" (Original, Radio Mix, and Live from Nashville)	Hillary Lindsey and Cary Barlowe	Maddie Conrad and Daphne Conrad	1-3. "Someday You'll Call My Name"	No	—N/a	
"Telescope" (Original, Radio Mix, and Live from Nashville)	Hillary Lindsey and Cary Barlowe	Maddie Conrad and Juliette Barnes	4-5. "Stop The World (And Let Me Off)"; 4-9. "Three's A Crowd"	Yes	—N/a	
"Twist of Barbwire"	Elvis Costello	Avery Barkley	1-2. "I Can't Help It (If I'm Still in Love With You)"	Yes	The Music of Nashville: Season 1, Volume 1	
"Twist of Barbwire"	Elvis Costello	Scarlett O'Connor	1-9. "Be Careful of Stones That You Throw"	Yes	The Music of Nashville, Season 1: The Complete Collection	
"Matchbox Blues"	Blind Lemon Jefferson	Deacon Claybourne	1-2. "I Can't Help It (If I'm Still in Love With You)"	No	The Music of Nashville: Season 1, Volume 2 (Deluxe Edition)	
"Fade Into You"	Trevor Rosen, Shane McAnally and Matt Jenkins	Scarlett O'Connor and Gunnar Scott	1-3. "Someday You'll Call My Name"	Yes	The Music of Nashville: Season 1, Volume 2	
"I Will Fall" (and Studio Version)	Tyler James and Kate York	Scarlett O'Connor and Gunnar Scott	1-3. "Someday You'll Call My Name"; 1-14. "Dear Brother"	Yes	The Music of Nashville: Season 1, Volume 2	
"Changing Ground"	Gillian Welch	Rayna Jaymes	1-4. "We Live in Two Different Worlds"	No	The Music of Nashville: Season 1, Volume 1 (Deluxe Edition)	
"American Beauty"	Ross Copperman, Bob DiPiero, and Jon Nite	Rayna Jaymes	1-5. "Move It on Over"	No	—N/a	
"Sideshow"	Aaron Scherz and Brad Tursi	Deacon Claybourne	1-5. "Move It on Over"	No	The Music of Nashville: Season 1, Volume 1	
"Buried Under" (& Alternative Version)	Chris DeStefano and Natalie Hemby	Rayna Jaymes	1-5. "Move It on Over"; 1-6. "You're Gonna Change (Or I'm Gonna Leave)"; 1-10. "I'm Sorry for You My Friend"; 2-17. "We've Got Things To Do"	Yes	The Music of Nashville: Season 1, Volume 1	
"Yellin' from the Rooftop"	Busbee and Sarah Buxton	Juliette Barnes	1-5. "Move It On Over"	Yes	The Music of Nashville, Season 1: The Complete Collection	
"Loving You Is the Only Way to Fly"	Jedd Hughes, Sarah Buxton and Rodney Crowell	Scarlett O'Connor, Gunnar Scott and Avery Barkley	1-5. "Move It On Over"	Yes	The Music of Nashville, Season 1: The Complete Collection	
"Kiss"	Sean McConnell	Avery Barkley	1-6. "You're Gonna Change (Or I'm Gonna Leave)"; 1-9. "Be Careful of Stones That You Throw"; 1-11. "You Win Again"	Yes	The Music of Nashville, Season 1: The Complete Collection	
"Wrong Song"	Sonya Isaacs, Jimmy Yeary and Marv Green	Rayna Jaymes and Juliette Barnes	1-7. "Lovesick Blues"; 1-11. "You Win Again"; 2-17. "We've Got Things To Do"	No	The Music of Nashville: Season 1, Volume 1	
"Love's Ring of Fire"	June Carter Cash and Merle Kilgore	Scarlett O'Connor	1-7. "Lovesick Blues"	No	The Music of Nashville: Season 1, Volume 1 (Deluxe Edition)	
"Papa Writes to Johnny"	Gillian Welch	Deacon Claybourne	1-7. "Lovesick Blues"	Yes	The Music of Nashville, Season 1: The Complete Collection	
"The Morning of the Rain" (& The Roadie Version)	Jonathan Jackson	Avery Barkley	1-7. "Lovesick Blues"; 1-19. "Why Don't You Love Me"	Yes	The Music of Nashville, Season 1: The Complete Collection	
"Peace in the Valley"	Gillian Welch	Avery Barkley	1-8. "Where He Leads Me"	Yes	The Music of Nashville, Season 1: The Complete Collection	
"When the Right One Comes Along"	Justin Davis, Georgia Middleman and Sarah Zimmermann	Gunnar Scott and Scarlett O'Connor	1-8. "Where He Leads Me"; 4-11. "Forever And For Always"	No	The Music of Nashville: Season 1, Volume 1	
"When the Right One Comes Along"	Justin Davis, Georgia Middleman and Sarah Zimmermann	Gunnar Scott	1-8. "Where He Leads Me"	Yes	The Music of Nashville, Season 1: The Complete Collection	
"For Your Glory"	Kate York, Leeland Mooring and Jack Mooring	Juliette Barnes	1-8. "Where He Leads Me"	Yes	The Music of Nashville, Season 1: The Complete Collection	
"Change Your Mind"	Hillary Lindsey, Gordie Sampson and Troy Verges	Scarlett O'Connor and Gunnar Scott	1-9. "Be Careful of Stones That You Throw"	Yes	The Music of Nashville, Season 1: The Complete Collection	
"I'm a Lonesome Fugitive"	Liz Anderson and Casey Anderson	Gunnar Scott and Jason Scott	1-10. "I'm Sorry for You My Friend"	No	—N/a	
"One Works Better"	Tofer Brown, Rosi Golan, Natalie Hemby and Kate York	Scarlett O'Connor and Gunnar Scott	1-11. "You Win Again"; 1-12. "I've Been Down That Road Before"	Yes	The Music of Nashville, Season 1: The Complete Collection	
"Keep Asking Why" (& Atlanta Mix)	Erin McCarley and Kate York	Avery Barkley	1-11. "You Win Again"; 1-15. "When You're Tired of Breaking Other Hearts"	Yes	The Music of Nashville: Season 1, Volume 2 (Deluxe Edition)	
"Consider Me" (Original, Studio, and Acoustic Version)	Ashley Monroe and Brendan Benson	Juliette Barnes	1-12. "I've Been Down That Road Before"	Yes	The Music of Nashville: Season 1, Volume 2 (Deluxe Edition)	
"I'm a Girl"	Mallary Hope, Shane Stevens and Matthew West	Juliette Barnes	1-12. "I've Been Down That Road Before"; 2-4. "You're No Angel Yourself"	Yes	The Music of Nashville, Season 1: The Complete Collection	
"Casino"	Morgane Hayes and Natalie Hemby	Scarlett O'Connor and Gunnar Scott	1-13. "There'll Be No Teardrops Tonight"	Yes	The Music of Nashville, Season 1: The Complete Collection	
"Fame"	Michael Gore and Dean Pitchford	Hayden Panettiere	Oscar Promo	Yes	Digital Download Only	
"We Are Water" (& Alternate Version)	Patty Griffin	Juliette Barnes	1-14. "Dear Brother"; 1-17. "My Heart Would Know"	Yes	The Music of Nashville: Season 1, Volume 2	
"Stronger Than Me"	Sarah Buxton and Kate York	Rayna Jaymes	1-14. "Dear Brother"; 2-3. "I Don't Wanna Talk About It Now"	Yes	The Music of Nashville: Season 1, Volume 2	
"Hypnotizing" (& Acoustic Version)	Cary Barlowe, Steve Robson and Caitlyn Smith	Juliette Barnes	1-15. "When You're Tired of Breaking Other Hearts"; 1-16. "I Saw the Light"; 1-19. "Why Don't You Love Me"; 1-20. "A Picture from Life's Other Side"; 2-2. "Never No More"; 2-6. "It Must Be You"; 2-7. "She's Got You"	Yes	The Music of Nashville: Season 1, Volume 2	
"Looking for a Place to Shine"	Natalie Hemby and Angela Lauer	Scarlett O'Connor	1-15. "When You're Tired of Breaking Other Hearts"; 1-20. "A Picture from Life's Other Side"	Yes	The Music of Nashville: Season 1, Volume 2	
"Let There Be Lonely"	Laura Rogers, Lydia Rogers and Gordie Sampson	Avery Barkley	1-15. "When You're Tired of Breaking Other Hearts"	Yes	The Music of Nashville: Season 1, Volume 2	
"Ho Hey"	Jeremy Fraites and Wesley Schultz	Maddie Conrad and Daphne Conrad	1-16. "I Saw the Light"; 1-20. "A Picture from Life's Other Side"; 2-19. "Crazy"	Yes	The Music of Nashville: Season 1, Volume 2	
"Stompin' Grounds"	Kelly Archer, Busbee, and Natalie Hemby	Rayna Jaymes	1-16. "I Saw the Light"; 1-19. "Why Don't You Love Me"	No	—N/a	
"Tough All Over"	Otis Blackmon and Jim Lauderdale	Gunnar Scott and Will Lexington	1-16. "I Saw the Light"	Yes	The Music of Nashville, Season 1: The Complete Collection	
"Tough All Over"	Otis Blackmon and Jim Lauderdale	Will Lexington	1-18. "Take These Chains from My Heart"	No	—N/a	
"Hangin' On a Lie"	Justin Davis and Sarah Zimmermann	Juliette Barnes	1-17. "My Heart Would Know"	Yes	The Music of Nashville, Season 1: The Complete Collection	
"You Ain't Dolly (And You Ain't Porter)"	Vince Gill and Ashley Monroe	Scarlett O'Connor and Will Lexington	1-17. "My Heart Would Know"	No	The Music of Nashville: Season 1, Volume 2 (Deluxe Edition)	
"Shine" (& Acoustic Version)	Trent Dabbs and Ashley Monroe	Gunnar Scott	1-17. "My Heart Would Know"	Yes	The Music of Nashville: Season 1, Volume 2 (Deluxe Edition)	
"Gun for a Mouth"	David Poe	Gunnar Scott	1-18. "Take These Chains from My Heart"; 1-19. "Why Don't You Love Me"	No	The Music of Nashville: Season 1, Volume 2	
"Postcard from Mexico"	John Hadley and David Olney	Rayna Jaymes and Liam McGuinnis	1-18. "Take These Chains from My Heart"	Yes	The Music of Nashville, Season 1: The Complete Collection	
"Postcard from Mexico"	John Hadley and David Olney	Rayna Jaymes and Deacon Claybourne	3-1. "That's Me Without You"	No	—N/a	
"Used"	Ross Copperman and Heather Morgan	Juliette Barnes	1-19. "Why Don't You Love Me"	Yes	The Music of Nashville, Season 1: The Complete Collection	
"The End of the Day"	Sarah Siskind and Madi Diaz	Deacon Claybourne and Rayna Jaymes	1-19. "Why Don't You Love Me"	Yes	The Music of Nashville, Season 1: The Complete Collection	
"A Showman's Life"	Jesse Winchester	Will Lexington	1-20. "A Picture from Life's Other Side"	Yes	The Music of Nashville, Season 1: The Complete Collection	
"If Momma Coulda Seen Me"	Steve Earle	Gunnar Scott	1-20. "A Picture from Life's Other Side"	Yes	The Music of Nashville, Season 1: The Complete Collection	
"Nothing in This World Will Ever Break My Heart Again" (& On the Record Version)	Sarah Buxton and Kate York	Juliette Barnes	1-20. "A Picture from Life's Other Side"; 1-21. "I'll Never Get Out of This World Alive"	No	The Music of Nashville: Season 1, Volume 2	
"Bitter Memory"	Lucinda Williams	Rayna Jaymes	1-21. "I'll Never Get Out of This World Alive"	No	The Music of Nashville: Season 1, Volume 2	
"Moon is High"	Elvis Costello	Avery Barkley and Scarlett O'Connor	1-21. "I'll Never Get Out of This World Alive"	Yes	The Music of Nashville, Season 1: The Complete Collection	

=== Season Two ===
List of songs in Nashville season two
Title	Written by	Performed by	Episode	Single	Album	Ref
"How You Learn To Live Alone"	Gretchen Peters and Mary Gauthier	Avery Barkley	2-1. "I Fall To Pieces"	No	The Music of Nashville: Season 2, Volume 1	
"Why Can't I Say Goodnight"	Angelo Petraglia and Kim Richey	Scarlett O'Connor and Gunnar Scott	2-1. "I Fall To Pieces"	Yes	The Music of Nashville: Season 2, Volume 1	
"This Love Ain't Big Enough"	Jill Andrews, Justin Davis and Sarah Zimmermann	Juliette Barnes	2-1. "I Fall To Pieces"	Yes	—N/a	
"Tears So Strong"	Jim Lauderdale	Will Lexington	2-2. "Never No More"; 2-5. "Don't Open That Door"	Yes	—N/a	
"Adios Old Friend"	Brett Eldredge and Kim Tribble	Gunnar Scott	2-2. "Never No More"	Yes	—N/a	
"Gonna Get Even"	Al Anderson, Pat McLaughlin, and Kacey Musgraves	Layla Grant	2-2. "Never No More"; 2-7. "She's Got You"	Yes	—N/a	
"Trouble Is"	Marv Green and Kate York	Juliette Barnes	2-3. "I Don't Wanna Talk About It Now"; 2-7. "She's Got You"; 3-3. "I Can't Get Over You to Save My Life"	Yes	The Music of Nashville: Season 2, Volume 1	
"Trouble Is"	Marv Green and Kate York	Juliette Barnes and Avery Barkley	2-10. "Tomorrow Never Comes"	No	—N/a	
"What If I Was Willing"	Brian Davis, Randy Montana, and Billy Montana	Will Lexington	2-3. "I Don't Wanna Talk About It Now"; 2-10. "Tomorrow Never Comes"; 2-12. "Just For What I Am"; 2-14. "Too Far Gone"; 2-16. "Guilty Street"; 2-20. "Your Good Girl's Gonna Go Bad"	Yes	The Music of Nashville: Season 2, Volume 1	
"What If I Was Willing"	Brian Davis, Randy Montana, and Billy Montana	Gunnar Scott	2-3. "I Don't Wanna Talk About It Now"; 2-4. "You're No Angel Yourself"	No	—N/a	
"Waitin'"	Caitlin Rose, Mark Fredson, Jordan Lehning, and Skylar Wilson	Scarlett O'Connor	2-3. "I Don't Wanna Talk About It Now"	No	The Music of Nashville: Season 2, Volume 1 (Deluxe Edition)	
"The Wayfaring Stranger"	Traditional	Zoey Dalton	2-4. "You're No Angel Yourself"	Yes	The Music of Nashville: Season 2, Volume 1	
"The Wayfaring Stranger"	Traditional	Blind Man	5-1. The Wayfaring Stranger	No	—N/a	
"The Wayfaring Stranger"	Traditional	Blind Man and Rayna Jaymes	5-1. The Wayfaring Stranger	Yes	—N/a	
"A Life That's Good" (& On the Record Version) (& Cast Version)	Ashley Monroe and Sarah Siskind	Maddie Conrad and Daphne Conrad	2-4. "You're No Angel Yourself"	Yes	The Music of Nashville: Season 2, Volume 1	
"A Life That's Good" (& On the Record Version) (& Cast Version)	Ashley Monroe and Sarah Siskind	Deacon Claybourne	2-4. "You're No Angel Yourself"; 2-7. "She's Got You"	No	The Music of Nashville: Season 2, Volume 1 (Deluxe Edition)	
"A Life That's Good" (& On the Record Version) (& Cast Version)	Ashley Monroe and Sarah Siskind	Maddie Conrad and Deacon Claybourne	2-9. "I'm Tired Of Pretending"	No	—N/a	
"A Life That's Good" (& On the Record Version) (& Cast Version)	Ashley Monroe and Sarah Siskind	Rayna Jaymes, Deacon Claybourne, Maddie Conrad and Daphne Conrad	2-21. "All or Nothing with Me"	No	The Music of Nashville: Season 2, Volume 2 (Deluxe Edition)	
"A Life That's Good" (& On the Record Version) (& Cast Version)	Ashley Monroe and Sarah Siskind	Deacon Claybourne, Maddie Conrad and Daphne Conrad	5-9. "If Tomorrow Never Comes"	No	The Music of Nashville: Season 5, Volume 2	
"A Life That's Good" (& On the Record Version) (& Cast Version)	Ashley Monroe and Sarah Siskind	Rayna Jaymes, Juliette Barnes, Scarlett O'Connor, Gunnar Scott,Avery Barkley, Will Lexington, Deacon Clayborne, Maddie Conrad and Daphne Conrad	6-16. "Beyond the Sunset"	Yes	The Music of Nashville: Season 6, Volume 2	
"Come See About Me"	Holland–Dozier–Holland	Scarlett O'Connor and Zoey Dalton	2-4. "You're No Angel Yourself"	No	The Music of Nashville: Season 2, Volume 1 (Deluxe Edition)	
"Be My Girl"	Jacob Bryant, Jon Davidson, and Derrick Southerland	Avery Barkley and Gunnar Scott	2-5. "Don't Open That Door"	No	The Music of Nashville: Season 2, Volume 1 (Deluxe Edition)	
"Be My Girl"	Jacob Bryant, Jon Davidson, and Derrick Southerland	Avery Barkley, Gunnar Scott and Zoey Dalton	2-5. "Don't Open That Door"	No	—N/a	
"This Town" (& On the Record Version)	Jaida Dreyer, Cory Mayo and Andrew Rollins	Deacon Claybourne	2-5. "Don't Open That Door"	No	—N/a	
"This Town" (& On the Record Version)	Jaida Dreyer, Cory Mayo and Andrew Rollins	Scarlett O'Connor and Deacon Claybourne	2-5. "Don't Open That Door"	Yes	The Music of Nashville: Season 2, Volume 1	
"The Best Songs Come From Broken Hearts"	Bonnie Bishop and Ronnie Rogers	Rayna Jaymes	2-5. "Don't Open That Door"	Yes	—N/a	
"Every Time I Fall In Love"	Al Anderson, Sarah Buxton, and Ken Johnson	Scarlett O'Connor	2-6. "It Must Be You"	Yes	—N/a	
"You're The Kind Of Trouble"	Paul Kennerley, Adam Wright, and Shannon Wright	Deacon Claybourne	2-6. "It Must Be You"; 2-7. "She's Got You"	Yes	—N/a	
"That's What I Do"	Lori McKenna and Troy Verges	Gunnar Scott	2-6. "It Must Be You"	Yes	—N/a	
"Share With You"	Garrison Starr	Maddie Conrad and Daphne Conrad	2-7. "She's Got You"	No	The Music of Nashville: Season 2, Volume 1	
"Ball and Chain"	Tammi Lynn Kidd and Paul Kennerley	Rayna Jaymes and Luke Wheeler	2-8. "Hanky Panky Woman"; 2-12. "Just For What I Am"; 2-17. "We've Got Things To Do"; 2-22. "On the Other Hand"	No	The Music of Nashville: Season 2, Volume 1	
"Ball and Chain"	Tammi Lynn Kidd and Paul Kennerley	Gunnar Scott	2-8. "Hanky Panky Woman"	No	—N/a	
"Ball and Chain"	Tammi Lynn Kidd and Paul Kennerley	Luke Wheeler, Will Lexington and Deacon Claybourne	3-10. "First to Have a Second Chance"	No	—N/a	
"Crazy Tonight"	Chip Boyd, Jay Clementi, and Kacey Musgraves	Scarlett O'Connor	2-8. "Hanky Panky Woman"; 2-10. "Tomorrow Never Comes"; 2-13. "It's All Wrong, But It's All Right"; 2-19. "Crazy"	Yes	—N/a	
"Dreams"	Jaida Dreyer and Cory Mayo	Juliette Barnes	2-8. "Hanky Panky Woman"; 2-11. "I'll Keep Climbing"; 2-13. "It's All Wrong, But It's All Right"	Yes	—N/a	
"Tell Me" (Original, Acoustic, On the Record Version)	Jaida Dreyer, Andrew Rollins, Cory Mayo and Jody Stevens	Layla Grant	2-9. "I'm Tired Of Pretending"	Yes	The Music of Nashville: Season 2, Volume 1	
"Can't Say No to You"	Sarah Buxton, Jedd Hughes and Gordie Sampson	Juliette Barnes and Will Lexington	2-9. "I'm Tired Of Pretending"; 2-14. "Too Far Gone"	No	The Music of Nashville: Season 2, Volume 1	
"Playin' Tricks"	Justin Davis, Sarah Zimmermann and Adam Wright	Deacon Claybourne	2-10. "Tomorrow Never Comes"; 2-16. "Guilty Street"	No	The Music of Nashville: Season 2, Volume 1	
"Can't Get It Right"	Matthew Perryman Jones and Lily Costner	Gunnar Scott	2-10. "Tomorrow Never Comes"; 2-12. "Just For What I Am"	No	The Music of Nashville: Season 2, Volume 1	
"Believing" (& On the Record Version)	Tami Hinesh, Emily Shackelton, and Kate York	Maddie Conrad and Deacon Claybourne	2-11. "I'll Keep Climbing"	No	The Music of Nashville: Season 2, Volume 2	
"Lately"	Sally Barris, Ashley Monroe, and Sarah Siskind	Gunnar Scott and Scarlett O'Connor	2-11. "I'll Keep Climbing"	Yes	The Music of Nashville: Season 2, Volume 2	
"Free"	Zac Brown	Zac Brown Band and Scarlett O'Connor	2-12. "Just For What I Am"	Yes	—N/a	
"Everything I'll Ever Need"	Dylan Altman and Kate York	Juliette Barnes and Avery Barkley	2-12. "Just For What I Am"	No	The Music of Nashville: Season 2, Volume 2 (Deluxe Edition)	
"This Time"	Allison Moorer and Jeffrey Steele	Rayna Jaymes and Deacon Claybourne	2-12. "Just For What I Am"	No	—N/a	
"This Time"	Allison Moorer and Jeffrey Steele	Rayna Jaymes	2-13. "It's All Wrong, But It's All Right"; 2-14. "Too Far Gone"; 2-18. "Your Wild Life's Gonna Get You Down"; 2-20. "Your Good Girl's Gonna Go Bad"; 2-22. "On the Other Hand"; 3-2. "How Far Down Can I Go"	Yes	The Music of Nashville: Season 2, Volume 2	
"This Time"	Allison Moorer and Jeffrey Steele	Rayna Jaymes, Deacon Claybourne, Maddie Conrad and Daphne Conrad	3-19. "The Storm Has Just Begun"	No	The Music of Nashville: Season 2, Volume 2	—N/a
"Black Roses" (Original, Piano/Vocal, On the Record Version)	Lucy Schwartz	Scarlett O'Connor	2-13. "It's All Wrong, But It's All Right"; 2-15. "They Don't Make 'Em Like My Daddy Anymore"; 2-19. "Crazy"	Yes	The Music of Nashville: Season 2, Volume 2	
"Don't Put Dirt On My Grave Just Yet" (Original, Orchestral, On the Record Version)	Trent Dabbs and Caitlyn Smith	Juliette Barnes	2-13. "It's All Wrong, But It's All Right"; 2-15. "They Don't Make 'Em Like My Daddy Anymore"; 3-2. "How Far Down Can I Go"; 5-13. "'Til I Can Make It On My Own"	Yes	The Music of Nashville: Season 2, Volume 2	
"Don't Put Dirt On My Grave Just Yet" (Original, Orchestral, On the Record Version)	Trent Dabbs and Caitlyn Smith	Juliette Barnes and Luke Wheeler	2-21. "All or Nothing with Me"	Yes	—N/a	
"The Blues Have Blown Away"	Jill Andrews and Shawn Camp	Maddie Conrad, Daphne Conrad and Rayna Jaymes	2-14. "Too Far Gone"	Yes	—N/a	
"Keep Coming Back"	Gareth Dunlop and Kim Richey	Deacon Claybourne	2-14. "Too Far Gone"	Yes	—N/a	
"Is That Who I Am"	Aaron Benward, Shaun Shankel, and Steve Moakler	Will Lexington	2-14. "Too Far Gone"	No	The Music of Nashville: Season 2, Volume 2	
"I Ain't Leaving Without Your Love" (Original, Acoustic, On the Record Version)	Cary Barlowe, Justin Davis and Sarah Zimmermann	Avery Barkley, Gunnar Scott and Zoey Dalton	2-15. "They Don't Make 'Em Like My Daddy Anymore"	Yes	The Music of Nashville: Season 2, Volume 2	
"Like New"	Jonathan Singleton, Justin Davis and Sarah Zimmermann	Deacon Claybourne	2-15. "They Don't Make 'Em Like My Daddy Anymore"; 4-7. "Can't Get Used to Losing You"	Yes	The Music of Nashville: Season 4, Volume 1	
"Hennessee"	Taylor Burns, Chris Hennessee, Joel King, Leroy Wulfmeier, and Richard Young	Avery Barkley, Gunnar Scott and Zoey Dalton	2-16. "Guilty Street"	Yes	The Music of Nashville: Season 2, Volume 2 (Deluxe Edition)	
"Come Find Me"	Sarah Buxton and John Scott Sherrill	Scarlett O'Connor	2-16. "Guilty Street"; 2-17. "We've Got Things To Do"	No	The Music of Nashville: Season 2, Volume 2 (Deluxe Edition)	
"Carry You Home"	Gordie Sampson, Caitlyn Smith, and Troy Verges	Zoey Dalton	2-17. "We've Got Things To Do"	No	The Music of Nashville: Season 2, Volume 2 (Deluxe Edition)	
"I Can't Sleep Tonight"	Jill Andrews and Wayne Kirkpatrick	Maddie Conrad and Daphne Conrad	2-17. "We've Got Things To Do"	No	—N/a	
"I Can't Sleep Tonight"	Jill Andrews and Wayne Kirkpatrick	Maddie Claybourne	2-19. "Crazy"	Yes	—N/a	
"It All Slows Down"	Karyn Rochelle and Sarah Siskind	Layla Grant	2-17. "We've Got Things To Do"	No	The Music of Nashville: Season 2, Volume 2	
"He Ain't Gonna Change"	Al Anderson and Karyn Rochelle	Rayna Jaymes and Juliette Barnes	2-17. "We've Got Things To Do"; 2-22. "On the Other Hand"	Yes	The Music of Nashville: Season 2, Volume 2	
"Joy Parade"	Jill Andrews and Josh Leo	Maddie Conrad and Daphne Conrad	2-18. "Your Wild Life's Gonna Get You Down"; 3-4. "I Feel Sorry for Me"; 3-6. "Nobody Said It Was Going to Be Easy"	Yes	The Music of Nashville: Season 2, Volume 2	
"It's On Tonight" (& On the Record Version)	Brett Beavers, Dustin Lynch, and David Lee Murphy	Luke Wheeler, Deacon Claybourne and Will Lexington	2-18. "Your Wild Life's Gonna Get You Down"	Yes	The Music of Nashville: Season 2, Volume 2	
"Tell That Devil"	Jill Andrews, Emery Dobyns, and Matthew Mayfield	Juliette Barnes	2-18. "Your Wild Life's Gonna Get You Down"; 3-2. "How Far Down Can I Go"	Yes	—N/a	
"Tell That Devil"	Jill Andrews, Emery Dobyns, and Matthew Mayfield	Zoey Dalton	3-5. "Road Happy"	No	—N/a	
"Falling"	Gareth Dunlop and Kim Richey	Scarlett O'Connor	2-18. "Your Wild Life's Gonna Get You Down"	No	The Music of Nashville: Season 2, Volume 2 (Deluxe Edition)	
"Your Good Girl's Gonna Go Bad"	Billy Sherrill and Glenn Sutton	Beverly O'Connor	2-19. "Crazy"	No	—N/a	
"Done Runnin'"	Jacob Davis, Bob Moffatt, Clint Moffatt and Shelley Skidmore	Zoey Dalton	2-19. "Crazy"	Yes	—N/a	
"It Ain't Yours To Throw Away"	Lee Brice, Jon Stone, and Pam Tillis	Gunnar Scott	2-20. "Your Good Girl's Gonna Go Bad"	Yes	—N/a	
"It Ain't Yours To Throw Away"	Lee Brice, Jon Stone, and Pam Tillis	Gunnar Scott and Scarlett O'Connor	2-22. "On the Other Hand"	Yes	—N/a	
"Hurtin' On Me"	Shane McAnally, Josh Osborne, and Trevor Rosen	Will Lexington	2-20. "Your Good Girl's Gonna Go Bad"	No	The Music of Nashville: Season 2, Volume 2 (Deluxe Edition)	
"Wrong For The Right Reasons"	Chris DeStefano, Rosi Golan, and Natalie Hemby	Rayna Jaymes	2-20. "Your Good Girl's Gonna Go Bad"	No	The Music of Nashville: Season 2, Volume 2 (Deluxe Edition)	
"Then I Was Loved By You" (& Acoustic Version)	Kalisa Ewing and Casey Wood	Will Lexington	2-21. "All or Nothing with Me"	Yes	The Music of Nashville: Season 2, Volume 2 (Deluxe Edition)	
"One Light Shining"	Ross Copperman, Blair Daly and Troy Verges	Avery Barkley	2-22. "On the Other Hand"	Yes	—N/a	

=== Season Three ===
List of songs in Nashville season three
Title	Written by	Performed by	Episode	Single	Album	Ref
"If It's Love"	Justin Davis, Sarah Zimmermann, and Aaron Eshuis	Will Lexington	3-1. "That's Me Without You"	Yes	The Music of Nashville: Season 3, Volume 1	
"Crazy"	Willie Nelson	Juliette Barnes	3-1. "That's Me Without You"	Yes	—N/a	
"Crazy"	Willie Nelson	Juliette Barnes and Steven Tyler	4-1. "Can't Let Go"	Yes	The Music of Nashville: Season 4, Volume 1	
"I Know How to Love You Now"	Charles Esten and Deana Carter	Deacon Claybourne	3-1. "That's Me Without You"	Yes	The Music of Nashville: Season 3, Volume 1	
"When You Open Your Eyes"	Nicole Johnson, Michael Logen and Sarah Emily Parrish	Scarlett O'Connor and Gunnar Scott	3-2. "How Far Down Can I Go"; 3-3. "I Can't Get Over You to Save My Life"	Yes	The Music of Nashville: Season 3, Volume 1	
"Good Woman – Good To Me"	Rodney Crowell	Luke Wheeler	3-2. "How Far Down Can I Go"; 3-3. "I Can't Get Over You to Save My Life"	Yes	The Music of Nashville: Season 3, Volume 1	
"If Your Heart Can Handle It"	Dean Alexander and Jaida Dreyer	Will Lexington and Layla Grant	3-3. "I Can't Get Over You to Save My Life"	Yes	The Music of Nashville: Season 3, Volume 1	
"The Most Beautiful Girl in the World"	David Poe	Avery Barkley, Gunnar Scott and Zoey Dalton	3-3. "I Can't Get Over You to Save My Life"	No	The Music of Nashville: Season 3, Volume 1	
"The Most Beautiful Girl in the World"	David Poe	Avery Barkley	3-3. "I Can't Get Over You to Save My Life"	No	—N/a	
"Ghost Town"	Will Chase	Luke Wheeler	3-3. "I Can't Get Over You to Save My Life"	No	—N/a	
"The Night Is Still Young"	Sarah Siskind and Kate York	Deacon Claybourne and Pam York	3-4. "I Feel Sorry for Me"	No	—N/a	
"Gasoline and Matches"	Buddy Miller and Julie Miller	Rayna Jaymes and Sadie Stone	3-4. "I Feel Sorry for Me"	Yes	The Music of Nashville: Season 3, Volume 1	
"Good Love"	Justin Davis, Jonathan Singleton and Sarah Zimmermann	Layla Grant	3-5. "Road Happy"	Yes	—N/a	
"Red Flag"	Stephanie Lambring and Shannon Wright	Scarlett O'Connor	3-5. "Road Happy"	No	—N/a	
"Put My Heart Down"	Elizabeth Huett, Nathan Chapman and Andrew Dorff	Luke Wheeler and Sara Evans	3-6. "Nobody Said It Was Going to Be Easy"	Yes	—N/a	
"Breathe In"	Allen Salmon, Andrew Combs and Sarah Siskind	Deacon Claybourne and Pam York	3-6. "Nobody Said It Was Going to Be Easy"	Yes	—N/a	
"Lies of the Lonely"	Natalie Hemby, Shane McAnally, and Josh Osborne	Rayna Jaymes	3-7. "I'm Coming Home to You"	Yes	The Music of Nashville: Season 3, Volume 1	
"Blind"	Maren Morris, Ian Fitchuk, and Jabe Beyer	Layla Grant	3-7. "I'm Coming Home to You"	Yes	—N/a	
"Disappear"	Jaida Dreyer, Cory Mayo, Steve Pasch and Andrew Rollins	Juliette Barnes	3-7. "I'm Coming Home to You"	No	The Music of Nashville: Season 3, Volume 1	
"Carry On"	Sarah Siskind and Julie Lee	Scarlett O'Connor and Terry George	3-7. "I'm Coming Home to You"	Yes	The Music of Nashville: Season 3, Volume 1	
"You Can't Stop Me"	Kacey Musgraves, Keith Gattis and Charlie Brocco	Sadie Stone	3-8. "You're Lookin' at Country"	Yes	—N/a	
"Borrow My Heart"	Phillip LaRue and Lia LaRue	Avery Barkley, Gunnar Scott and Scarlett O'Connor	3-9. "Two Sides To Every Story"	No	The Music of Nashville: Season 3, Volume 2	
"Baby, It's Cold Outside"	Frank Loesser	Rayna Jaymes and Luke Wheeler	3-9. "Two Sides To Every Story"	Yes	Christmas with Nashville	
"Storm's Comin'"	Jim Lauderdale	Terry George	3-9. "Two Sides To Every Story"	Yes	—N/a	
"We Got a Love"	Jill Andrews and Lori McKenna	Maddie Conrad and Daphne Conrad	3-10. "First to Have a Second Chance"	Yes	—N/a	
"That's Alright Mama"	Arthur "Big Boy" Crudup	Deacon Claybourne and Scarlett O'Connor	3-10. "First to Have a Second Chance"	Yes	—N/a	
"Novocaine"	Caitlyn Smith, Steven Lee Olsen and Cary Barlowe	Sadie Stone and Avery Barkley	3-10. "First to Have a Second Chance"	No	The Music of Nashville: Season 3, Volume 2 (Deluxe Edition)	
"Roots and Wings"	Sarah Siskind and Kylie Sackley	Gunnar Scott and Micah Brenner	3-11. "I'm Not That Good at Goodbye"	Yes	—N/a	
"Sad Song" (& Full Band Version)	Ashley Monroe & Matraca Berg	Sadie Stone	3-11. "I'm Not That Good at Goodbye"; 3-13. "I'm Lost Between Right or Wrong"	Yes	The Music of Nashville: Season 3, Volume 2	
"If I Drink This Beer"	Jonathan Singleton and Brad Tursi	Luke Wheeler	3-11. "I'm Not That Good at Goodbye"	Yes	The Music of Nashville: Season 3, Volume 2	
"One By One"	Nicole Johnson and Josh Johnson	Juliette Barnes	3-12. "I've Got Reasons to Hate You"	No	The Music of Nashville: Season 3, Volume 2 (Deluxe Edition)	
"Heart on Fire"	Kate York, Sarah Buxton and Blair Daly	Maddie Conrad and Daphne Conrad	3-12. "I've Got Reasons to Hate You"; 3-13. "I'm Lost Between Right or Wrong"; 3-15. "That's the Way Love Goes"	Yes	The Music of Nashville: Season 3, Volume 2	
"Friend of Mine"	Lucy Schwartz and Johnny Hanson	Scarlett O'Connor, Deacon Claybourne and Beverly O'Connor	3-12. "I've Got Reasons to Hate You"	Yes	—N/a	
"Real Life"	Maren Morris, Trey Bruce, and Derek Cannavo	Maddie Conrad, Daphne Conrad and Rayna Jaymes	3-12. "I've Got Reasons to Hate You"	No	The Music of Nashville: Season 3, Volume 2	
"I've Got You (and You've Got Me)"	Jacob Davis, Shelley Skidmore, Bob Moffatt & Clint Moffatt	Maddie Conrad	3-13. "I'm Lost Between Right or Wrong"	Yes	The Music of Nashville: Season 3, Volume 2	
"Can't Help My Heart"	Sarah Buxton, Jedd Hughes and Kevin Griffin	Luke Wheeler; Luke Wheeler and Sadie Stone	3-13. "I'm Lost Between Right or Wrong"; 3-16. "I Can't Keep Away from You"; 3-17. "This Just Ain't a Good Day for Leavin'"	Yes	The Music of Nashville: Season 3, Volume 2	
"I'm On It"	Matt Jenkins, Matt Ramsey and Trevor Rosen	Will Lexington	3-14. "Somebody Pick Up My Pieces"; 3-21. "Is The Better Part Over"	Yes	The Music of Nashville: Season 3, Volume 2	
"World On Time"		Gunnar Scott, Scarlett O'Connor and Avery Barkley	3-14. "Somebody Pick Up My Pieces"	Yes	—N/a	
"If I'm Still Dreaming"	Daniel Tashian & Cary Barlowe	The Triple Exes	3-15. "That's the Way Love Goes"	Yes	—N/a	
"The Rivers Between Us"	Eric Kaz and JD Souther	Rayna James and Deacon Claybourne	3-15. "That's the Way Love Goes"; 3-21. "Is The Better Part Over"	Yes	The Music of Nashville: Season 3, Volume 2	
"Broken Song"	Cody Johnson, Tony Lane and Travis Meadows	Will Lexington	3-16. "I Can't Keep Away from You"	Yes	The Music of Nashville: Season 3, Volume 2	
"My Song"	Sarah Siskind and Femke Weidema	The Triple Exes	3-16. "I Can't Keep Away from You"	Yes	The Music of Nashville: Season 3, Volume 2	
"This is What I Need to Say"	Sarah Siskind	Avery Barkley	3-16. "I Can't Keep Away from You"	Yes	The Music of Nashville: Season 3, Volume 2	
"Big Bad Love"	Andrew Combs	Ron Pope	3-17. "This Just Ain't a Good Day for Leavin'"	Yes	—N/a	
"Longer"	Andrea Davidson	Scarlett O'Connor and Gunnar Scott	3-17. "This Just Ain't a Good Day for Leavin'"; 3-18. "Nobody Knows But Me"	Yes	The Music of Nashville: Season 3, Volume 2	
"Hold You in My Arms"	Sarah Siskind	Juliette Barnes and Avery Barkley	3-17. "This Just Ain't a Good Day for Leavin'"; 4-3. "How Can I Help You Say Goodbye"	Yes	The Music of Nashville: Season 3, Volume 2	
"The Real Thing"	Jackie Tohn & Audra Mae	Jade St. John	3-18. "Nobody Knows But Me"	Yes	—N/a	
"Spinning Revolver"	Sean McConnell & Ashley Ray	Will Lexington	3-18. "Nobody Knows But Me"; 4-20. It's Sure Gonna Hurt	Yes	—N/a	
"Spinning Revolver"	Sean McConnell & Ashley Ray	Luke Wheeler	4-5. "Stop The World (And Let Me Off)"	Yes	The Music of Nashville: Season 4, Volume 1	
"Spinning Revolver"	Sean McConnell & Ashley Ray	Will Lexington and Kevin Bicks	5-2. Back in Baby's Arms	—N/a	—N/a	
"My Heart Don't Know When to Stop"	Allen Salmon and Shannon Wright	Layla Grant	3-18. "Nobody Knows But Me"	Yes	The Music of Nashville: Season 3, Volume 2	
"On a Rail"	Joel King, Ricky Young, Taylor Burns, Eli Wulfmeier & Chris Hennessee	The Triple Exes	3-18. "Nobody Knows But Me"	Yes	—N/a	
"Have a Little Faith in Me"	John Hiatt	Luke Wheeler and Daphne Conrad	3-19. "The Storm Has Just Begun"	Yes	The Music of Nashville: Season 3, Volume 2	
"Shotgun"	Sean McConnell & Audra Mae	Jade St. John	3-19. "The Storm Has Just Begun"	Yes	—N/a	
"Follow Your Heart"	Claire Guerreso & Jill Andrews	Scarlett O'Connor and Gunnar Scott	3-20. "Time Changes Things"	Yes	—N/a	
"Trouble"	Nicole Galyon & Chris Roberts	Beverly O'Connor and Deacon Claybourne	3-20. "Time Changes Things"	Yes	—N/a	
"Trouble"	Nicole Galyon & Chris Roberts	Beverly O'Connor	3-20. "Time Changes Things"	Yes	—N/a	
"Mississippi Flood"	Tofer Brown, Lucie Silvas and Jamie Floyd	Juliette Barnes	3-20. "Time Changes Things"; 3-21. "Is The Better Part Over"; 4-1. "Can't Let Go"; 4-2. "'Til the Pain Outwears the Shame"	Yes	The Music of Nashville: Season 3, Volume 2	
"I Found A Way"	Shannon Wright and Adam Wright	Layla Grant	3-21. "Is The Better Part Over"	No	The Music of Nashville: Season 3, Volume 2	
"Something's Gotta Give"	Sarah Siskind & Wayne Kirkpatrick	Scarlett O'Connor and Gunnar Scott	3-21. "Is The Better Part Over"	Yes	The Music of Nashville: Season 3, Volume 2	
"Surrender"	Jaida Dreyer, Andrew Rollins, & Brian Loschiavo	Rayna Jaymes and Deacon Claybourne	3-21. "Is The Better Part Over"	Yes	—N/a	
"Your Love Keeps Me Alive"	Sarah Siskind & Kate York	Rayna Jaymes and Deacon Claybourne	3-21. "Is The Better Part Over"	No	—N/a	
"Anywhere From Here"	Sarah Buxton, Sarah Siskind & Kate York	Maddie Conrad, Daphne Conrad and Beverly O'Connor	3-22. "Before You Go Make Sure You Know"	Yes	—N/a	
"I Will Never Let You Know"	Erin McCarley, Kevin Rhoads & Kate York	Scarlett O'Connor and Gunnar Scott	3-22. "Before You Go Make Sure You Know"; 4-20. "It's Sure Gonna Hurt""	Yes	—N/a	
"Last Honest Man"	Marcus Hummon & Laura Veltz	Juliette Barnes	3-22. "Before You Go Make Sure You Know"; 4-4. "The Slender Threads That Bind Us Here"	Yes	—N/a	

=== Season Four ===
List of songs in Nashville season four
Title	Written by	Performed by	Episode	Single	Album	Ref
"Hymn For Her"	Andrew Dorff and Jon McLaughlin	Deacon Claybourne	4-1. "Can't Let Go"	Yes	—N/a	
"Wake Up When It's Over"	Michael Logen and Maren Morris	Scarlett O'Connor and Gunnar Scott	4-1. "Can't Let Go"	Yes	—N/a	
"Rockin' & Rollin'"	Levin Hummon and Sean McConnell	Maddie Conrad and Daphne Conrad	4-2. "'Til the Pain Outwears the Shame"	Yes	The Music of Nashville: Season 4, Volume 1	
"What If It's You"	Scott Effman, Lily Elise and Audra Mae	Juliette Barnes	4-2. "'Til the Pain Outwears the Shame"; 4-7. "Can't Get Used to Losing You"	Yes	The Music of Nashville: Season 4, Volume 1	
"Makes No Sense At All"	Hillary Lindsey and Ashley Monroe	Layla Grant	4-2. "'Til the Pain Outwears the Shame"	Yes	—N/a	
"Beyond The Sun"	Claire Guerreso and Aaron Espe	Maddie Conrad	4-3. "How Can I Help You Say Goodbye"	Yes	The Music of Nashville: Season 4, Volume 1	
"Bad Reputation"	Joan Jett, Ritchie Cordell, Kenny Laguna and Marty Joe Kupersmith	Juliette Barnes and Luke Wheeler	4-3. "How Can I Help You Say Goodbye"	Yes	—N/a	
"Speak To Me"	Lucy Schwartz, Sarah Siskind and Tofer Brown	Scarlett O'Connor	4-3. "How Can I Help You Say Goodbye"	Yes	The Music of Nashville: Season 4, Volume 1	
"Take My Hand, Precious Lord"	Thomas A. Dorsey	Zoey Dalton	4-4. "The Slender Threads That Bind Us Here"	Yes	The Music of Nashville: Season 4, Volume 1	
"I Want To (Do Everything For You)"	Joe Tex	Rayna Jaymes and Markus Keen	4-4. "The Slender Threads That Bind Us Here"	Yes	The Music of Nashville: Season 4, Volume 1	
"Mess Worth Making"	Maren Morris, Kelly Archer and Justin Weaver	Layla Grant	4-4. "The Slender Threads That Bind Us Here"	Yes	—N/a	
"Count On Me"	Claire Guerreso and Viktor Krauss	Gunnar Scott	4-4. "The Slender Threads That Bind Us Here"	Yes	The Music of Nashville: Season 4, Volume 1	
"Can't Stop a Heart"	Sarah Siskind	Layla Grant	4-5. "Stop The World (And Let Me Off)"	Yes	—N/a	
"In the Name of Your Love"	Sean McConnell	Markus Keen	4-6. "Please Help Me, I'm Fallin'"	Yes	The Music of Nashville: Season 4, Volume 1	
"Run with Me"	Al Anderson and Adam Sanders	Will Lexington	4-6. "Please Help Me, I'm Fallin'"	Yes	The Music of Nashville: Season 4, Volume 1	
"Curtain Call"	Rosi Golan and Liz Rose	Scarlett O'Connor	4-6. "Please Help Me, I'm Fallin'"	Yes	—N/a	
"Curtain Call"	Rosi Golan and Liz Rose	Beverly O'Connor	4-6. "Please Help Me, I'm Fallin'"	No	—N/a	
"Holding on to What I Can't Hold"	Steve Paul Robson and Travis Meadows	Frankie Gray	4-7. "Can't Get Used to Losing You"	Yes	The Music of Nashville: Season 4, Volume 1	
"Sleep Tonight (A Lullaby)"	Lucy Schwartz, John Hanson and Steve Pasch	Will Lexington and Avery Barkley	4-7. "Can't Get Used to Losing You"	No	The Music of Nashville: Season 4, Volume 1	
"Too Far from You"	Sarah Siskind	Layla Grant	4-7. "Can't Get Used to Losing You"	No	The Music of Nashville: Season 4, Volume 1	
"All I Want Is Us Tonight"	Dylan Altman, Eric Paslay and Will Hoge	Markus Keen	4-8. "Unguarded Moments"	Yes	The Music of Nashville: Season 4, Volume 1	
"Plenty Far To Fall"	Garrison Starr, Alex Dezen, Sandy Chila	Scarlett O'Connor and Gunnar Scott	4-8. "Unguarded Moments"; 5-12. "Back in the Saddle Again"	No	The Music of Nashville: Season 4, Volume 1	
"History of My Heart"	Chris Gelbuda and Kylie Sackley	Avery Barkley	4-8. "Unguarded Moments"	Yes	—N/a	
"Only Tennessee"	Claire Guerreso & Daniel Tashian	Scarlett O'Connor	4-9. "Three's A Crowd"	Yes	The Music of Nashville: Season 4, Volume 2	
"Don't Make 'Em Like You No More"	Chris Gelbuda, Cory Crowder and James Otto	Markus Keen	4-9. "Three's A Crowd"	Yes	—N/a	
"Kissin' 'n Huggin'"	Garrison Starr, Nini Camps & Andrew Rollins	Gunnar Scott	4-9. "Three's A Crowd"	Yes	—N/a	
"'Til the Stars Come Out Again"	Garrison Starr & Justin Glasco	Daphne Conrad	4-10. "We've Got Nothing But Love To Prove"	Yes	The Music of Nashville: Season 4, Volume 2	
"Tonight Feels Different"	Daniel Tashian & Keelan Donovan	Markus Keen	4-10. "We've Got Nothing But Love To Prove"	Yes	—N/a	
"Hand To Hold"	Brett Rutledge & Jessica Campbell	Deacon Claybourne and Scarlett O'Connor	4-10. "We've Got Nothing But Love To Prove"	Yes	—N/a	
"All We Ever Wanted"	Kate York & Matraca Berg	Maddie Conrad and Daphne Conrad	4-11. "Forever And For Always"	Yes	The Music of Nashville: Season 4, Volume 2	
"From Here On Out"	Andy Albert, Stephanie Lambring & Timothy Bowen	Deacon Claybourne	4-11. "Forever And For Always"	Yes	The Music of Nashville: Season 4, Volume 2	
"When The Right One Comes Along (Wedding Version With Strings)"	Justin Davis, Sarah Zimmermann, & Georgia Middleman	Scarlett O'Connor and Gunnar Scott	4-11. "Forever And For Always"	Yes	—N/a	
"Together Again"	Buck Owens	Jim Lauderdale	4-11. "Forever And For Always"	Yes	—N/a	
"Down The Line"	Jeananne Goossen, Eric Silver, & Mindy Smith	Vita Martin	4-12. "How Does It Feel to be Free"	Yes	—N/a	
"Ain't It Beautiful"	Sean McConnell, Michael Dulaney & Lee Thomas Miller	Will Lexington	4-12. "How Does It Feel to be Free"	Yes	The Music of Nashville: Season 4, Volume 2	
"Swept Away"	Audra Mae, Blake Sennett & Jarrod Gorbel	Maddie Conrad and Cash Grey	4-12. "How Does It Feel to be Free"	Yes	The Music of Nashville: Season 4, Volume 2	
"The Rubble"	Sarah Zimmermann, Justin Davis & Paul Moak	Scarlett O'Connor and Gunnar Scott	4-13. "If I Could Do It All Again"	Yes	The Music of Nashville: Season 4, Volume 2	
"This Old Guitar"	Chuck Cannon & Chuck Jones	Vita Martin	4-13. "If I Could Do It All Again"	Yes	—N/a	
"If You Don't Mean Business"	Kalisa Ewing, Radney Foster, Jessy Schram	Cash Grey	4-13. "If I Could Do It All Again"	Yes	—N/a	
"Both Hands on the Wheel"	Chris Stapleton & Guy Clark	Riff Bell	4-13. "If I Could Do It All Again"	Yes	—N/a	
"I'm Coming Over"	Trent Dabbs & Ashley Monroe	Gunnar Scott and Scarlett O'Connor	4-14. "What I Cannot Change"	Yes	—N/a	
"The Book"	Maren Morris, Tina Parol, & Natalie Hemby	Layla Grant	4-14. "What I Cannot Change"	Yes	N/A	
"The Book"	Maren Morris, Tina Parol, & Natalie Hemby	Layla Grant and Avery Barkley	4-16. "Didn't Expect It To Go Down This Way"	Yes	—N/a	
"Take Mine"	Miranda Lambert, Kacey Musgraves & Natalie Hemby	Rayna Jaymes and Autumn Chase	4-15. "When There's A Fire In Your Heart"	Yes	—N/a	
"Wild Card"	Rosi Golan, Claire Guerreso & Daniel Tashian	Maddie Conrad	4-15. "When There's A Fire In Your Heart"	Yes	The Music of Nashville: Season 4, Volume 2	
"Hole In The World"	Gordie Sampson, Katrina Elam & Steve McEwan	Juliette Barnes	4-15. "When There's A Fire In Your Heart"	Yes	The Music of Nashville: Season 4, Volume 2	
"Can't Say No To Love"	Gabe Dixon, Rose Falcon & Joe Ginsberg	Luke Wheeler	4-16. Didn't Expect It to Go Down This Way	Yes	The Music of Nashville: Season 4, Volume 2	
"Moving On Never Felt So Good"	Gareth John Owen Dunlop	Will Lexington	4-16. Didn't Expect It to Go Down This Way	Yes	The Music of Nashville: Season 4, Volume 2	
"Willing Heart"	Nini Camps & Lori McKenna	Maddie Conrad and Daphne Conrad	4-17. "Baby Come Home"	Yes	—N/a	
"One Place Too Long"	Haley Cole, Bobby Hamrick	Juliette Barnes	4-17. "Baby Come Home"	Yes	The Music of Nashville: Season 4, Volume 2	
"Hold on to Me"	Bob Moffatt, Clint Moffatt & Summer Overstreet	Rayna Jaymes	4-17. "Baby Come Home"	Yes	The Music of Nashville: Season 4, Volume 2	
"Caged Bird"	Tina Parol & Maren Morris	Layla Grant	4-17. "Baby Come Home"	Yes	The Music of Nashville: Season 4, Volume 2	
"Kinda Dig The Feeling"	Tyler Bryant, Tom Douglas & Jaren Johnston	Avery Barkley	4-19. After You've Gone	Yes	The Music of Nashville: Season 4, Volume 2	
"Boomtown"	Ryan Hurd, Maren Morris & Gordie Sampson	Juliette Barnes and Luke Wheeler	4-18. The Trouble with the Truth	Yes	The Music of Nashville: Season 4, Volume 2	
"Strong Tonight"	Rita Wilson, Blair Daly & Kelly Archer	Rayna Jaymes	4-19. After You've Gone	Yes	The Music of Nashville: Season 4, Volume 2	
"Soul Survivor"	Barry Dean, Natalie Hemby & Luke Laird	Layla Grant and Avery Barkley	4-20. It's Sure Gonna Hurt	Yes	The Music of Nashville: Season 4, Volume 2	
"Blue Wonderful"	Elton John and Bernie Taupin	Elton John and Gunnar Scott	4-20. It's Sure Gonna Hurt	No	—N/a	
"Brothers"	Peter Bradley Adams, Chris Carmack and Samuel Brinsley Ashworth	Will Lexington and Luke Wheeler	4-21. Maybe You'll Appreciate Me Someday	Yes	—N/a	
"Together We Stand"	Blair Daly and Gareth Dunlop	Rayna Jaymes and Daphne Conrad	4-21. Maybe You'll Appreciate Me Someday	Yes	—N/a	
"Love You Home"	Stephanie Lambring	Gunnar Scott and Scarlett O'Connor	4-21. You'll Appreciate Me Someday	Yes	—N/a	

=== Season Five ===
List of songs in Nashville season five
Title	Written by	Performed by	Episode	Single	Album	Ref
"God Shall Wipe All Tears Away"	J.R. Baxter and Wesley H. Daniel	Hallie Jordan	5-1. The Wayfaring Stranger	No	The Music of Nashville: Season 5, Volume 1	
"Your Best"	Claire Guerreso	Maddie Conrad and Daphne Conrad	5-1. The Wayfaring Stranger	Yes	The Music of Nashville: Season 5, Volume 1	
"Your Best"	Claire Guerreso	Maddie Conrad and Daphne Conrad	5-1. The Wayfaring Stranger	—N/a	The Music of Nashville: Season 5, Volume 2	
"All of Me"	Phillip LaRue, Tim Lauer, and Lindy Robbins	Scarlett O'Connor and Gunnar Scott	5-2. Back in Baby's Arms; 5-5. Love Hurts; 5-6. A Little Bit Stronger; 5-7. Hurricane	Yes	The Music of Nashville: Season 5, Volume 1	
"Simple as That"	Carson Chamberlain, Jeff Hyde, and Roger Springer	Deacon Claybourne	5-2. Back in Baby's Arms	Yes	The Music of Nashville: Season 5, Volume 1	
"A Few Steps My Way"	Gareth Dunlop	Clayton Carter	5-3. Let's Put It Back Together Again	Yes	The Music of Nashville: Season 5, Volume 1	
"Out for Love"	Maren Morris, Daniel Tashian, and Angelo Petraglia	Ashley Willerman	5-3. Let's Put It Back Together Again	—N/a	—N/a	
"On My Way"	Thomas Finchum, Paige Blue, and Chance Pena	Juliette Barnes	5-3. Let's Put It Back Together Again; 5-13. 'Til I Can Make It on My Own	Yes	The Music of Nashville: Season 5, Volume 1	
"Burn to Dark"	Jake Etheridge and Garrison Starr	Will Lexington	5-4. Leap of Faith	Yes	The Music of Nashville: Season 5, Volume 1	
"Before You"	Sean McConnell	Clayton Carter	5-5. Love Hurts; 5-6. A Little Bit Stronger	Yes	The Music of Nashville: Season 5, Volume 2	
"In Love"	Mindy Smith	Maddie Conrad	5-5. Love Hurts	Yes	The Music of Nashville: Season 5, Volume 2	
"This World Don't Owe Me Nothin'"	Mindy Smith	Clayton Carter	5-5. Love Hurts	Yes	The Music of Nashville: Season 5, Volume 2	
"Won't Back Down"	Trent Dabbs and Matt Dragstrem	Avery Barkley	5-6. A Little Bit Stronger	Yes	The Music of Nashville: Season 5, Volume 1	
"His Eye Is on the Sparrow"	Civilla D. Martin & Charles H. Gabriel	Hallie Jordan	5-6. A Little Bit Stronger	Yes	—N/a	
"Sourwood Mountain"	Traditional	Hallie Jordan	5-6. A Little Bit Stronger	Yes	The Music of Nashville: Season 5, Volume 2	
"Can't Nobody Do Me Like Jesus"	Andrae Crouch	Hallie Jordan	5-6. A Little Bit Stronger	Yes	The Music of Nashville: Season 5, Volume 2	
"Wide Open"	Jonathan Singleton, Dan Isbell and Reid Isbell	Luke Wheeler	5-6. A Little Bit Stronger	Yes	The Music of Nashville: Season 5, Volume 2	
"My Favorite Hurricane"	Jillian Chapman	Rayna Jaymes and Deacon Claybourne	5-7. Hurricane	Yes	The Music of Nashville: Season 5, Volume 1	
"Close to the Fire"	Brian Loschiavo and Keelan Donovan	Clayton Carter	5-8. Stand Beside Me	Yes	The Music of Nashville: Season 5, Volume 1	
"Eye of the Storm"	Brian Loschiavo and Keelan Donovan	Avery Barkley	5-8. Stand Beside Me	Yes	The Music of Nashville: Season 5, Volume 2	
"East Iris"	Tim Lauer	Daphne Conrad	5-9. If Tomorrow Never Comes	Yes	—N/a	
"Make You Feel My Love"	Bob Dylan	Daphne Conrad	5-9. If Tomorrow Never Comes	Yes	The Music of Nashville: Season 5, Volume 1	
"By Your Side"	Chance Pena and Simon Gugala	Will Lexington	5-10. I'll Fly Away	Yes	The Music of Nashville: Season 5, Volume 2	
"Sanctuary"	Sarah Siskind, Jill Andrews and Gary Nicholson	Deacon Clayborne, Maddie Conrad and Daphne Conrad	5-10. I'll Fly Away	Yes	The Music of Nashville: Season 5, Volume 1	
"You're Mine"	Jake Etheridge and Matt Crosby	Rayna Jaymes, Juliette Barnes, Scarlett O'Connor, Gunnar Scott,Avery Barkley, Will Lexington, Deacon Clayborne, Maddie Conrad and Daphne Conrad	5-11. Fire and Rain	Yes	The Music of Nashville: Season 5, Volume 2	
"Can't Remember Never Loving You"	Byron Hill, Ian Janes	Rayna Jaymes and Deacon Claybourne	5-11. Fire and Rain	Yes	The Music of Nashville: Season 5, Volume 2	
"Saved"	Lennon Stella, MaryLynne Stella, and Matt McVaney	Maddie Conrad	5-12. Back in the Saddle Again; 5-14. (Now and Then There's) A Fool Such as I 5-21. Farther On; 5-22. Reasons to Quit	Yes	The Music of Nashville: Season 5, Volume 2	
"You're Standing on My Neck"	Splendora	Daphne Conrad and Liv	5-12. Back in the Saddle Again; 5-13. 'Til I Can Make It on My Own	No	—N/a	
"Stand Up"	Josh Thompson, Cary Barlowe and Jordan Schmidt	Will Lexington	5-12. Back in the Saddle Again	Yes	The Music of Nashville (Season 5, Volume 3)	
"Run With Me"	Justin Tam and Richard Jacques	Avery Barkley	5-13. 'Til I Can Make It on My Own	Yes	—N/a	
"The Hell of It Is"	Trent Dabbs, Charlie Peacock, and Jillian Jacquelin	Scarlett O'Connor and Gunnar Scott	5-13. 'Til I Can Make It on My Own	Yes	The Music of Nashville (Season 5, Volume 2)	
"Beautiful Dream (Clayton Remix)"	Ben Caver and Erin McCarley	Maddie Conrad and Clayton Carter; Maddie Conrad	5-14. (Now and Then There's) A Fool Such as I 5-19. You Can't Lose Me	Yes	—N/a	
"When I Look at the World"	Lucinda Williams	Jessie Caine	5-14. (Now and Then There's) A Fool Such as I	Yes	—N/a	
"Beautiful Dream (Ballad Version)"	Ben Caver and Erin McCarley	Maddie Conrad	5-14. (Now and Then There's) A Fool Such as I	Yes	The Music of Nashville (Season 5, Volume 3)	
"Wrong Kind of Right (Bluebird Version)"	Rhiannon Giddens	Hallie Jordan	5-15. A Change Would Do You Good	Yes	—N/a	
"Water Rising"	Derrick Southerland, Hillary Lindsey and Jamie Moore	Juliette Barnes; Juliette Barnes and Maddie Conrad	5-15. A Change Would Do You Good; 5-18. The Night Before (Life Goes On); 5-19. You Can't Lose Me 5-22. Reasons to Quit	Yes	The Music of Nashville (Season 5, Volume 3)	
"Wrong Kind of Right"	Rhiannon Giddens	Hallie Jordan	5-15. A Change Would Do You Good	Yes	—N/a	
"Love Until It Hurts"	Angela Lauer, Frankie Zwick and Jessie Lane Parker	Maddie Conrad and Daphne Conrad	5-15. A Change Would Do You Good	Yes	The Music of Nashville (Season 5, Volume 3)	
"Going Down the Road Feeling Bad"	Nathaniel Shilkret and Gene Austin	Hallie Jordan	5-16. Not Ready to Make Nice	Yes	The Music of Nashville (Season 5, Volume 3)	
"Who I Love"	Lindsey Bachelder, Aaron Espe, and Garrison Starr	Hallie Jordan	5-16. Not Ready to Make Nice	Yes	—N/a	
"Count On Me"	Rhiannon Giddens and Dirk Powell	Hallie Jordan	5-16. Not Ready to Make Nice	Yes	The Music of Nashville (Season 5, Volume 3)	
"Tennis Shoes"	Ali Tamposi, Dan Omelio and Lennon Stella	Maddie Conrad and Daphne Conrad	5-16. Not Ready to Make Nice	Yes	—N/a	
"As the Crow Flies"	Jake Etheridge and Olivia Rudeen	Scarlett O'Connor and Gunnar Scott	5-17. Ghost in This House 5-22. Reasons to Quit	Yes	The Music of Nashville (Season 5, Volume 3)	
"Good Man"	Jake Etheridge, Phillip LaRue and Tim Lauer	Will Lexington	5-17. Ghost in This House	Yes	—N/a	
"Learning How To Lose You"	Frankie Zwick	Jessie Caine	5-17. Ghost in This House	Yes	—N/a	
"No One Cares About Your Dreams"	David Poe	Avery Barkley	5-18. The Night Before (Life Goes On)	Yes	The Music of Nashville (Season 5, Volume 3)	
"This is the Moment"	Angela Lauer and Tim Lauer	Scarlett O'Connor and Gunnar Scott	5-18. The Night Before (Life Goes On)	Yes	—N/a	
"Dreaming My Dreams with You"	Allen Reynolds	Deacon Claybourne	5-18. The Night Before (Life Goes On)	Yes	The Music of Nashville (Season 5, Volume 3)	
"Forever"	Angela Lauer and Jessie Early	Scarlett O'Connor	5-19. You Can't Lose Me	Yes	The Music of Nashville (Season 5, Volume 3)	
"Coat of Pain"	Stephanie Lambring	Jessie Caine	5-20. Speed Trap Town	Yes	—N/a	
"Texas Cookin'"	Guy Clark	Gunnar Scott and Jason Scott	5-20. Speed Trap Town	No	—N/a	
"In the End"	Mindy Smith and Dustin Christensen	Gunnar Scott	5-20. Speed Trap Town	No	The Music of Nashville (Season 5, Volume 3)	
"You Don't Know Me"	Eddy Arnold & Cindy Williams	Alyssa Greene	5-21. Farther On	Yes	—N/a	
"Rose and Thorn"	ohnny Hanson, Lauren Strahm & Tofer Brown	Avery Barkley	5-21. Farther On	No	The Music of Nashville (Season 5, Volume 3)	
"Without You"	Heather Morgan & Ross Copperman	Deacon Claybourne	5-21. Farther On	No	The Music of Nashville (Season 5, Volume 3)	
"Simple as That (Opry Version)"	Brad Tursi, James LeBlanc & Kalisa Ewing	Deacon Claybourne	5-21. Farther On	No	—N/a	
"Good Rain or Jesus"	Barry Dean & Jonathan Singleton	Deacon Claybourne	5-21. Farther On	No	The Music of Nashville (Season 5, Volume 3)	
"Clockwork"	Lennon Stella, MaryLynne Stella & Trent Dabbs	Maddie Conrad and Daphne Conrad	5-22. Reasons to Quit	No	The Music of Nashville (Season 5, Volume 3)	
"Little Darlin'"	Julie Anne Miller	Scarlett O'Connor and Will Lexington	5-22. Reasons to Quit	No	The Music of Nashville (Season 5, Volume 3)	

=== Season Six ===
List of songs in Nashville season six
Title	Written by	Performed by	Episode	Single	Album	Ref
"Is There Anybody Out There"	Garrison Starr, Austin Plaine and K.S. Rhoads	Juliette Barnes	6-1. New Strings	Yes	The Music of Nashville (Season 6, Volume 1)	
"Don't Come Easy"	Dan Fernandez, Dave Berg & Sam Riggs	Will Lexington	6-1. New Strings	Yes		
"What It's Made For"	Connor Thuotte, Matt McVaney & Katie Garfield	Maddie Conrad	6-1. New Strings	Yes	The Music of Nashville (Season 6, Volume 1)	
"Never Come Back Again"	Austin Plaine	Gunnar Scott	6-1. New Strings	Yes	The Music of Nashville (Season 6, Volume 1)	
"Ain't No Normal"	Caylee Hammack & Travis Meadows	Scarlett O' Connor	6-2. Second Chances	Yes	The Music of Nashville (Season 6, Volume 1)	
"Right Where You Want Me"	Jim Lauderdale & Odie Blackmon	Will Lexington & Gunnar Scott	6-2. Second Chances	Yes		
"Stop the World (And Let Me Off)"	W.S. Stevenson & Carl Belew	Will Lexington, Avery Barkley & Gunnar Scott	6-2. Second Chances	Yes		
"Come and Find Me"	Jillian Edwards and Ben Shive	Daphne Conrad	6-3. Jump Then Fall	Yes	The Music of Nashville (Season 6, Volume 1)	
"Come and Find Me (Montage Version)"	Jillian Edwards and Ben Shive	Daphne Conrad	6-3. Jump Then Fall	Yes		
"Different Kind of Hot"	Bobby Campbell, Calynn Green, and Joshua Miller	Jonah Ford	6-3. Jump Then Fall	Yes		
"Will You Feel the Same"	Matt McVaney and Tony McVaney	Maddie Conrad & Jonah Ford	6-3. Jump Then Fall	Yes		
"I Always Will"	Mindy Smith, Thomas Finchum, and Gabe Scott	Juliette Barnes	6-3. Jump Then Fall	Yes	The Music of Nashville (Season 6, Volume 1)	
"My Arms"	Nathan Chapman, Adam Hambrick & Jeremy Stover	Will Lexington, Avery Barkley & Gunnar Scott	6-4. That's My Story	Yes		
"'Tearin Up My Heart"	Max Martin and Kristian Lundin	Will Lexington, Avery Barkley & Gunnar Scott	6-4. That's My Story	Yes		
"Wandering Roads"	Dirk Powell & Rhiannon Giddens	Hallie Jordan and Deacon Claybourne	6-4. That's My Story	Yes	The Music of Nashville (Season 6, Volume 1)	
"Looking for the Light"	Charles Esten, Charlie Worsham & Dennis Matkosky	Deacon Claybourne	6-5. Where the Night Goes	Yes	The Music of Nashville (Season 6, Volume 1)	
"Sweet Revenge"	Sarah Buxton, John Davidson & Jacob Bryant	Alannah	6-5. Where the Night Goes	Yes		
"Go With It"	Andrew Petroff, Luke Sheets & Ryan Kinder	Will Lexington, Avery Barkley & Gunnar Scott	6-5. Where the Night Goes	Yes		
"Hold On (Not Leaving You Behind)"	Angela Lauer & Jessie Early	Alannah, Will Lexington, Avery Barkley & Gunnar Scott	6-5. Where the Night Goes	Yes	The Music of Nashville (Season 6, Volume 1)	
"Raised On a Song"	Clint Morffat, Bob Moffat & Summer Overstreet	Scarlett O'Connor	6-6. Beneath Still Waters	Yes		
"The Only Way to Get There"	Adam Agin, K.S. Rhoads & Greta Morgan	Sean McPherson	6-6. Beneath Still Waters	Yes		
"Love Is Loud"	David Poe	Alannah, Will Lexington, Avery Barkley & Gunnar Scott	6-6. Beneath Still Waters	Yes	The Music of Nashville (Season 6, Volume 1)	
"River Swimming"	Jill Andrews & Trent Dabbs	Alannah	6-6. Beneath Still Waters	Yes		
"Unravel"	Lennon Stella, MaryLynne Stella & Tom Douglas	Daphne Conrad	6-7. Can't Help But Wonder Where I'm Bound	Yes	The Music of Nashville (Season 6, Volume 1)	
"Smoking the Boys"	Audra Mae Butts & Deana Carter	Alannah, Will Lexington, Avery Barkley & Gunnar Scott	6-7. Can't Help But Wonder Where I'm Bound	Yes		
"Face the Sun"	Ruston Kelly, Ian Fitchuk & Sarah Siskind	Deacon Claybourne	6-8. Sometimes You Just Can't Win	Yes	The Music of Nashville (Season 6, Volume 1)	
"Dear Fear"	MaryLynne Stella, Lennon Stella, Emily Shackelton & Liz Rose	Daphne Conrad	6-8. Sometimes You Just Can't Win	Yes		
"Hard Days"	Austin Plaine	Alannah, Will Lexington, Avery Barkley & Gunnar Scott	6-8. Sometimes You Just Can't Win	Yes		
"Talk Myself Out"	Jenny Leigh	Jenny Leigh	6-8. Sometimes You Just Can't Win	Yes		
"Bring Me An Angel"	Jake Etheridge	Sean McPherson	6-8. Sometimes You Just Can't Win	Yes		
"Sorry Now"	Jill Andrews and Trent Dabbs	Alannah	6-9. Pick Yourself Up	Yes	The Music of Nashville (Season 6, Volume 2)	
"Hard Days"	Austin Plaine	Alannah, Avery Barkley & Gunnar Scott	6-9. Pick Yourself Up	Yes		
"The Giver"	K.S. Rhoads and Jill Andrews	Avery Barkley	6-9. Pick Yourself Up	Yes	The Music of Nashville (Season 6, Volume 2)	
"My Turn"	Maren Morris & Chris Gelbuda	Will Lexington	6-9. Pick Yourself Up	Yes	The Music of Nashville (Season 6, Volume 2)	
"Bring Me an Angel"	Jake Etheridge	Sean McPherson	6-10. Two Sparrows in a Hurricane	Yes	The Music of Nashville (Season 6, Volume 2)	
"Love Goes On"	Ilse DeLange	Ilse DeLange	6-10. Two Sparrows in a Hurricane	Yes	The Music of Nashville (Season 6, Volume 2)	
"Go"	Ricky Young, Micah Wilshire & Tim Lauer	Alannah, Will Lexington, Avery Barkley & Gunnar Scott	6-10. Two Sparrows in a Hurricane	Yes	The Music of Nashville (Season 6, Volume 2)	
"Memories Crash"	Jillian Edwards & Jake Etheridge	Daphne Conrad	6-10. Two Sparrows in a Hurricane	Yes		
"We Belong"	Lennon Stella, Marylynne Stella, Daniel James Brigham & Joshua Silverberg	Maddie Conrad	6-11. No Place That Far	Yes		
"Duermete Mi Nino (Bolivian Lullaby)"	N/A	Juliette Barnes	6-11. No Place That Far	Yes		
"Like New"	Sarah Zimmermann, Justin Davis & Jonathan David Singleton	Deacon Claybourne	6-12. The House That Built Me	Yes		
"If You're Going Down"	Frankie Zwick	Alannah	6-12. The House That Built Me	Yes		
"Love Can Hold It All"	Tim Lauer, Lauren Strahm, & Peter Groenwald	Maddie Conrad & Daphne Conrad	6-12. The House That Built Me	Yes	The Music of Nashville (Season 6, Volume 2)	
"With You I'm Home"	Jake Etheridge & Michael Joseph Reaves	Sean McPherson	6-12. The House That Built Me	Yes		
"Without Warning"	Lennon Stella, Marylynne Stella, & Kevin Griffin	Daphne Conrad	6-13. Strong Enough to Bend	Yes	The Music of Nashville (Season 6, Volume 2)	
"Fall to Fly"	Busbee & Lucia Silvas	Jenny Leigh	6-13. Strong Enough to Bend	Yes		
"Let Love In"	Rhiannon Giddens	Hallie Jordan	6-13. Strong Enough to Bend	Yes	The Music of Nashville (Season 6, Volume 2)	
"Itty Bitty Ditty"	Charles Esten	Deacon Claybourne	6-14. For the Sake of the Song	Yes	The Music of Nashville (Season 6, Volume 2)	
"I'll Waltz You Home"	Ronny Cox & Russel Smith	Gideon Claybourne	6-14. For the Sake of the Song	Yes	The Music of Nashville (Season 6, Volume 2)	
"Treading Water"	Rainee Blake & Frankie Zwick	Alannah	6-14. For the Sake of the Song	Yes		
"When You Came Along"	Jake Etheridge & Clare Bowen & Brandon Robert Young	Sean McPherson & Scarlett O' Connor	6-15. I Don't Want To Lose You Yet	Yes	The Music of Nashville (Season 6, Volume 2)	
"Going Electric"	Sam Palladio, Trent Dabbs, & Jabe Beyer	Gunnar Scott	6-15. I Don't Want To Lose You Yet	Yes	The Music of Nashville (Season 6, Volume 2)	
"Falling Hard"	Angela Lauer & Jessie Early	Alannah & Avery Barkley	6-15. I Don't Want To Lose You Yet	Yes		
"Little Fire"	Sarah Buxton, Lennon Stella & Kate York	Maddie Conrad	6-16. Beyond the Sunset	Yes	The Music of Nashville (Season 6, Volume 2)	
"Dwell in my Soul"	Gareth Dunlop	Alannah	6-16. Beyond the Sunset	Yes		
"Carolina Rain"	Rhiannon Giddens & Dirk Powell	Hallie Jordan	6-16. Beyond the Sunset	Yes		
"All That Matters"	Tiffany Vartanyan, Henrik Michelson, Edvard Erfjord & Stephanie Jones	Jenny Leigh	6-16. Beyond the Sunset	Yes		
"Heart"	Tenille Townes, Chris Caminiti & Victoria Banks	Daphne Conrad	6-16. Beyond the Sunset	Yes		
"Free"	Jill Andrews & K.S. Rhoads	Juliette Barnes	6-16. Beyond the Sunset	Yes	The Music of Nashville (Season 6, Volume 2)	
"A Life That's Good"	Sarah Siskind & Ashley Monroe	Rayna Jaymes, Juliette Barnes, Scarlett O'Connor, Gunnar Scott,Avery Barkley, Will Lexington, Deacon Clayborne, Maddie Conrad and Daphne Conrad, Gideon Claybourne, Bucky Dawes, Glenn Goodman, Emily G, Cadence Barkley	6-16. Beyond the Sunset	Yes	The Music of Nashville (Season 6, Volume 2)	
