= Hayden Panettiere filmography and discography =

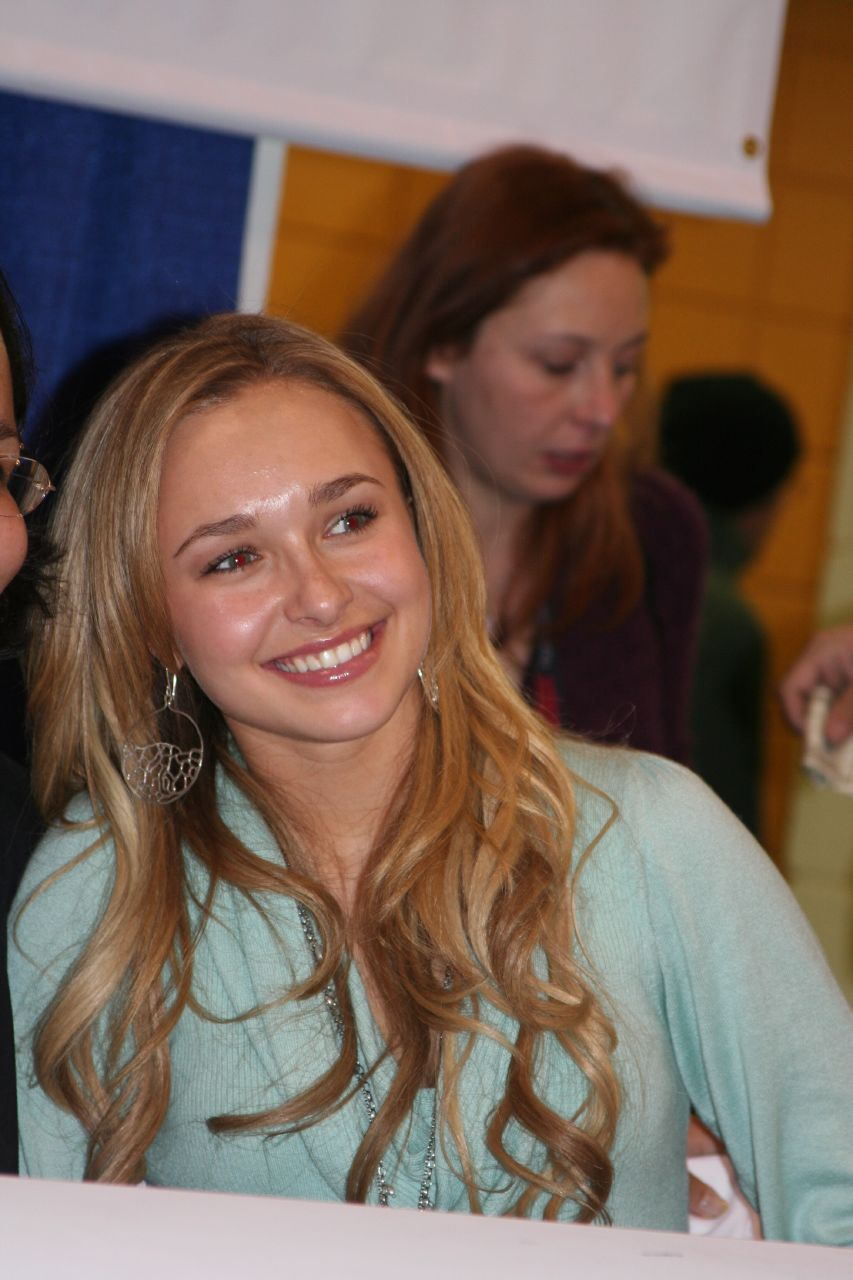
Hayden Panettiere in 2007

Hayden Lesley Panettiere (1989–2026) was an American actress and singer. She starred as Claire Bennet on the NBC superhero series Heroes (2006–2010), Kirby Reed in the slasher horror franchise Scream (2011–2023), and Juliette Barnes in the ABC/CMT musical drama series Nashville (2012–2018).

Her full-time acting career began in 1994 when she played Sarah Roberts in the ABC soap opera series One Life to Live until 1997. She played Lizzie Spaulding in the CBS soap opera series Guiding Light from 1996 to 2000. She voiced Kairi and Xion in the video game series Kingdom Hearts (2002–2017) from which she first gained popularity in the video games industry, and portrayed Samantha "Sam" Giddings in the video game Until Dawn (2015).

== Filmography ==
=== Film ===
Year	Title	Role	Notes	Ref.
1998	The Object of My Affection	Mermaid		
1998	A Bug's Life	Princess Dot	Voice role	
1999	Message in a Bottle	Girl on Sinking Boat		
2000	Dinosaur	Suri	Voice role	
2000	Remember the Titans	Sheryl Yoast		
2001	The Affair of the Necklace	Young Jeanne de Valois-Saint-Rémy		
2001	Joe Somebody	Natalie Scheffer		
2004	Raising Helen	Audrey Davis		
2004	The Dust Factory	Melanie Lewis		
2005	Racing Stripes	Channing "Chan" Walsh		
2005	Ice Princess	Gennifer "Gen" Harwood		
2006	The Good Student	Allyson "Ally" Palmer		
2006	The Architect	Christina Waters		
2006	Bring It On: All or Nothing	Britney Allen	Direct-to-video	
2007	Shanghai Kiss	Adelaide Bourbon	Direct-to-video	
2007	Diary of a New Girl	Hannah Rochelle	Voice role	
2008	Fireflies in the Garden	Young Jane Lawrence		
2008	Scooby-Doo! and the Goblin King	Fairy Princess Willow	Voice role; direct-to-video	
2009	I Love You, Beth Cooper	Beth Cooper		
2009	The Cove	Herself	Documentary	
2010	Alpha and Omega	Kate	Voice role	
2011	The Forger	Amber Felter	Direct-to-video	
2011	Scream 4	Kirby Reed		
2011	Hoodwinked Too! Hood vs. Evil	Red Puckett	Voice role	
2016	Custody	Ally Fisher		
2022	Scream	Kirby Reed	Uncredited voice (as Partygoer) and photograph cameo (as Kirby; uncredited in end credits); only credited as "special thanks"	
2023	Scream VI	Kirby Reed		
2024	Amber Alert	Jacqueline "Jaq" Dana	Direct-to-video; also executive producer	
2025	A Breed Apart	Hayden Hearst	Direct-to-video	
2026	Sleepwalker	Sarah Pangborn	Direct-to-video; also executive producer - final role	

=== Television ===
Year	Title	Role	Notes	Ref.
1994–1997	One Life to Live	Sarah Roberts	Recurring role; 26 episodes	
1996	Aliens in the Family	Audrey Freely	Episode: "Too Good to Be True"	
1996	How Do You Spell God?	Megan Blackwood	Television film	
1996–2000	Guiding Light	Lizzie Spaulding	Main role; 45 episodes	
1997	Unhappily Ever After	Little Girl	Episode: "Little Ice Cream Shop of Horrors"	
1998	A Will of Their Own	Unknown	Miniseries; unknown episodes	
1999	Too Rich: The Secret Life of Doris Duke	Young Doris Duke	Miniseries; 2 episodes	
1999	Touched by an Angel	Diana	Episode: "Godspeed"	
1999	If You Believe	Young Susan Stone / Alice Stone	Television film	
2001, 2005	Law & Order: Special Victims Unit	Ashley Austin Black	Episode: "Abuse"	
2001, 2005	Law & Order: Special Victims Unit	Angela Agnelli	Episode: "Hooked"	
2002	Ally McBeal	Maddie Harrington	Main role; 10 episodes (season 5)	
2003	Normal	Patty Ann Applewood	Television film	
2003–2005	Malcolm in the Middle	Jessica	Recurring role; 4 episodes (seasons 4, 6–7)	
2004	Fillmore!	Yumi	Voice role; Episode: "Code Name: Electric Haircut	
2004	Tiger Cruise	Maddie Dolan	Television film	
2005	Lies My Mother Told Me	Haylei Sims	Television film	
2006	Commander in Chief	Stacy	Episode: "Wind Beneath My Wing"	
2006	Skater Boys	Kassidy Parker #2	Episode: "Band of Gold"	
2006–2010	Heroes	Claire Bennet	Main role; 73 episodes	
2006–2012	Punk'd	Herself	4 episodes	
2007	Robot Chicken	Cheetara / Ramona / Seuss Sister	Voice roles; Episode: "Endless Breadsticks"	
2010	American Dad!	Ashley	Voice role; Episode: "Stan's Food Restaurant"	
2011	Amanda Knox: Murder on Trial in Italy	Amanda Knox	Television film	
2012	Project Runway	Herself	Guest judge; Episode: "Women on the Go"	
2012–2018	Nashville	Juliette Barnes	Main role; 112 episodes	
2014	Nashville on the Record	Herself	Television special	
2015–2016	Heroes Reborn	Claire Bennet	Archive footage; uncredited	
2016	Chopped Junior	Herself	Guest judge; Episode: "Cuteness Overload"	
2016	Lip Sync Battle	Herself	Episode: "Eva Longoria vs. Hayden Panettiere"	

=== Audio ===
Year	Title	Role	Notes	Ref.
2026	This Is Me: A Reckoning	Narrator		

=== Video games ===
Year	Title	Voice role	Notes	Ref.
1998	A Bug's Life	Princess Dot		
1999	Disney's Princess Fashion Boutique	Narrator		
2002	The Mark of Kri	Tati		
2002	Kingdom Hearts	Kairi		
2006	Kingdom Hearts II	Kairi		
2010	Kingdom Hearts Birth by Sleep	Kairi		
2012	Kingdom Hearts 3D: Dream Drop Distance	Kairi		
2013	Kingdom Hearts HD 1.5 Remix	Kairi	Archive audio	
2014	Kingdom Hearts HD 2.5 Remix	Kairi	Archive audio	
2015	Until Dawn	Samantha "Sam" Giddings		
2017	Kingdom Hearts HD 2.8 Final Chapter Prologue	Xion	Archive audio	
2024	Until Dawn	Samantha "Sam" Giddings	Remake version; additional post-credit scene	
2026	Kingdom Hearts Collection [I~III]	Kairi	Archive audio	

=== Music videos ===
Year	Title	Artist	Role	Notes
2010	"I'd Rather Be with You"	Joshua Radin	Joshua's girlfriend	British version
2013	"1994"	Jason Aldean	Herself	

== Discography ==
=== Singles ===
Year	Single	Peak chart positions			Sales	Album
Year	Single	US Country	US Country Airplay	US Country Digital	Sales	Album
2008	"Wake Up Call"	—	—	—		Digital download only
2012	"Telescope"	36	33	29	US: 24,000	The Music of Nashville: Season 1, Volume 1
2013	"Fame"	—	—	—		Digital download only
2013	"Hypnotizing"	—	—	50		The Music of Nashville: Season 1, Volume 2
2014	"Crazy" (traditional version)	—	—	—		Digital download only
2014	"White Christmas"	—	—	—		Christmas with Nashville
2015	"Crazy" (duet version with Steven Tyler)	—	—	—		The Music of Nashville: Season 4, Volume 1
"—" denotes releases that did not chart

=== Other charted songs ===
Year	Single	Peak chart positions			Sales	Album
Year	Single	US Country	US Country Digital	US	Sales	Album
2012	"Love Like Mine"	43	34	—	US: 11,000	The Music of Nashville: Season 1, Volume 1
2012	"Undermine" (with Charles Esten)^{A}	35	16	116	US: 70,000	The Music of Nashville: Season 1, Volume 1
2012	"Wrong Song" (with Connie Britton)	39	24	—	US: 17,000	The Music of Nashville: Season 1, Volume 1
2012	"For Your Glory"	46	29	—		Music From Nashville – Season One: The Complete Collection
2013	"Boys and Buses"	44	30	—	US: 15,000	Music From Nashville – Season One: The Complete Collection
2013	"I'm a Girl"	43	34	—		Music From Nashville – Season One: The Complete Collection
2013	"Trouble Is"	—	41	—		Music From Nashville – Season One: The Complete Collection
2013	"Consider Me"	37	24	—		Music From Nashville – Season One: The Complete Collection
2013	"Hypnotizing"	—	50	—	US: 18,000	The Music of Nashville: Season 1, Volume 2
2013	"Nothing in This World Will Ever Break My Heart Again"	41	32	—	US: 15,000	The Music of Nashville: Season 1, Volume 2
2014	"Don't Put Dirt on My Grave Just Yet"	34	23	—	US: 470,000	The Music of Nashville: Season 2, Volume 2
2014	"He Ain't Gonna Change" (with Connie Britton)	50	41	—		The Music of Nashville: Season 2, Volume 2
"—" denotes releases that did not chart

- ^{A}Did not enter the Hot 100 but charted on Bubbling Under Hot 100 Singles

=== Music videos ===
Year	Video	Director
2004	"My Hero is You"	
2004	"Someone Like You"	
2005	"I Fly"	
2007	"I Still Believe"	
2008	"Wake Up Call"	Chris Applebaum
2011	"I Can Do It Alone"	
2012	"Telescope"	TK McKamy
2013	"Fame"	
2013	"The Fabric of My Life"	Pam Thomas

=== Soundtrack appearances ===
Year	Song	Soundtrack / album
2004	"My Hero Is You"	Tiger Cruise
2004	"Someone Like You" (with Watt White)	The Dust Factory
2005	"I Fly"	Ice Princess Soundtrack
2006	"Your New Girlfriend"	Girl Next Vol.1
2007	"Home"	Shanghai Kiss
2007	"I Still Believe"	Cinderella III: A Twist in Time
2007	"Try"	Music from and Inspired by Bridge to Terabithia
2007	"Cruella de Vil"	DisneyMania 5
2007	"Go to Girl"	Girl Next Vol.2
2011	"I Can Do It Alone"	Hoodwinked Too! (Hood vs. Evil) [Original Motion Picture Soundtrack]
2011	"Inseparable"	Hoodwinked Too! (Hood vs. Evil) [Original Motion Picture Soundtrack]
2012	"Undermine" (with Charles Esten)	The Music of Nashville: Season 1 Volume 1
2012	"Wrong Song" (with Connie Britton)	The Music of Nashville: Season 1 Volume 1
2012	"Love Like Mine"	The Music of Nashville: Season 1 Volume 1
2012	"Telescope"	The Music of Nashville: Season 1 Volume 1
2012	"Boys and Buses"	The Music of Nashville, Season One: The Complete Collection
2012	"Yellin' from the Rooftop"	The Music of Nashville, Season One: The Complete Collection
2012	"For Your Glory"	The Music of Nashville, Season One: The Complete Collection
2013	"We Are Water"	The Music of Nashville: Season 1 Volume 2
2013	"Hypnotizing"	The Music of Nashville: Season 1 Volume 2
2013	"Nothing in This World Will Ever Break My Heart Again"	The Music of Nashville: Season 1 Volume 2
2013	"Consider Me"	The Music of Nashville: Season 1 Volume 2
2013	"I'm A Girl"	The Music of Nashville, Season One: The Complete Collection
2013	"Used"	The Music of Nashville, Season One: The Complete Collection
2013	"Hangin' On a Lie"	The Music of Nashville, Season One: The Complete Collection
2013	"Trouble Is"	The Music of Nashville: Season 2, Volume 1
2013	"Can't Say No to You" (with Chris Carmack)	The Music of Nashville: Season 2, Volume 1
2013	"This Love Ain't Big Enough"	Hayden Panettiere As Juliette Barnes, Season 2
2013	"Dreams"	Hayden Panettiere As Juliette Barnes, Season 2
2014	"Everything I'll Ever Need" (with Jonathan Jackson)	The Music of Nashville: Season 2, Volume 2
2014	"Don't Put Dirt On My Grave Just Yet"	The Music of Nashville: Season 2, Volume 2
2014	"He Ain't Gonna Change" (with Connie Britton)	The Music of Nashville: Season 2, Volume 2
2014	"Tell That Devil"	Hayden Panettiere As Juliette Barnes, Season 2
2014	"Crazy" traditional version (performing as Patsy Cline)	Digital download only
2014	"Disappear"	The Music of Nashville: Season 3, Volume 1
2014	"Nothing in This World Will Ever Break My Heart Again (Live)"	Nashville: On The Record
2014	"White Christmas"	Christmas with Nashville
2014	"Celebrate Me Home" (with Clare Bowen, Connie Britton, Will Chase, Charles Esten, Jonathan Jackson, Sam Palladio, Aubrey Peeples, Chaley Rose and Lennon & Maisy)	Christmas with Nashville
2015	"One by One" (with Jonathan Jackson)	The Music of Nashville: Season 3, Volume 2
2015	"Hold You in My Arms" (with Jonathan Jackson)	The Music of Nashville: Season 3, Volume 2
2015	"Mississippi Flood"	The Music of Nashville: Season 3, Volume 2
2015	"Last Honest Man"	Digital download only
2015	"Crazy" (duet version with Steven Tyler of Aerosmith)	The Music of Nashville: Season 4, Volume 1
2015	"What If It's You"	The Music of Nashville: Season 4, Volume 1
2015	"Bad Reputation" (with Will Chase)	Digital download only
2016	"Hole In The World"	The Music of Nashville: Season 4, Volume 2
2016	"One Place Too Long"	The Music of Nashville: Season 4, Volume 2
2016	"Boomtown" (with Will Chase)	The Music of Nashville: Season 4, Volume 2
2017	"On My Way" (with Jonathan Jackson)	The Music of Nashville: Season 5, Volume 1
2017	"You're Mine" (with Connie Britton, Charles Esten, Lennon & Maisy, Clare Bowen, Sam Palladio, Jonathan Jackson & Chris Carmack)	The Music of Nashville: Season 5, Volume 2
2017	"Water Rising"	The Music of Nashville: Season 5, Volume 3
2017	"On My Way" (choir version)	The Music of Nashville: Season 5, Volume 3
2018	"Is There Anybody Out There"	Nashville, Season 6: Episode 1 (Music from the Original TV Series), The Music of Nashville: Season 6, Volume 1
2018	"I Always Will"	Nashville, Season 6: Episode 3 (Music from the Original TV Series), The Music of Nashville: Season 6, Volume 1
2018	"Duermete Mi Nino (Bolivian Lullaby)"	Nashville, Season 6: Episode 11 (Music from the Original TV Series)
2018	"Free"	Nashville, Season 6: Episode 16 (Music from the Original TV Series), The Music of Nashville: Season 6, Volume 2
2018	"A Life That's Good" (with Connie Britton, Charles Esten, Lennon & Maisy, Clare Bowen, Sam Palladio, Jonathan Jackson, Chris Carmack, & Ronny Cox)	Nashville, Season 6: Episode 16 (Music from the Original TV Series), The Music of Nashville: Season 6, Volume 2

=== Compilation albums ===
Title	Album details
Nashville: Season 1 (by the cast of Nashville)	Released: May 13, 2014; Label: Big Machine Records; Format: digital download
Nashville: Season 2 (by the cast of Nashville)	Released: May 23, 2014; Label: Big Machine Records; Format: digital download
