= Striking Matches =

American country music duo

- Origin: Nashville, Tennessee, U.S.
- Genres: blues; rock; country
- Years active: 2007–present
- Members: Sarah Zimmermann; Justin Davis
- Website: www.strikingmatches.com

Striking Matches is an American duo consisting of guitarists/songwriters Sarah Zimmermann and Justin Davis.

== History ==
Meeting in a guitar seminar class at Nashville's Belmont University in 2007, Zimmermann and Davis combined their talents and began honing their songwriting and performance skills. Shortly thereafter, they quit school to pursue their music career full-time. The duo made their performing debut at Nashville's Bluebird Café. They self-released a self-titled EP in October 2012.

=== 2012: Nashville (TV Show) ===
On a trip to Nashville, the music supervisor for the television series Nashville, Frankie Pine, heard Justin Davis and Sarah Zimmermann who performed for her at the office of Universal Publishing, and decided to use their songs on the show. "When the Right One Comes Along" became their first song to be featured in the show, and a total of nine of their songs have been featured in the show's four seasons:

- "When the Right One Comes Along" (Performed by Clare Bowen and Sam Palladio in S01E08 and in S04E11). Included in The Music of Nashville: Season 1, Volume 1 and in The Music of Nashville, Season 1: The Complete Collection
- "Hangin' On a Lie" (Performed by Hayden Panettiere in S01E17). Included in The Music of Nashville, Season 1: The Complete Collection
- "This Love Ain't Big Enough" (Performed by Hayden Panettiere in S02E01).
- "Playin' Tricks" (Performed by Charles Esten in S02E10 and S02E16). Included in The Music of Nashville: Season 2, Volume 1
- "I Ain't Leaving Without Your Love" (Performed by Jonathan Jackson, Sam Palladio and Chaley Rose in S02E15). Included in The Music of Nashville: Season 2, Volume 2
- "Like New" (Performed by Charles Esten in S02E15 and S04E07). Included in The Music of Nashville: Season 4, Volume 1
- "If It's Love" (Performed by Chris Carmack in S03E01). Included in The Music of Nashville: Season 3, Volume 1
- "Good Love" (Performed by Aubrey Peeples in S03E05).
- "The Rubble" (Performed by Clare Bowen and Sam Palladio in S04E13). Included in The Music of Nashville: Season 4, Volume 2

=== 2015: Nothing but the Silence ===
The duo became signed to the newly revived I.R.S. Records label, their debut album Nothing but the Silence, produced by T Bone Burnett, was released on March 22, 2015. The album debuted at No. 25 on the Top Country Albums chart, with 1,800 copies sold for its debut week. It also reached No. 1 on UK Country iTunes.

=== 2019: EP Series ===
Striking Matches plans to release a series three EPs in 2019 and 2020, entitled Morning, Noon, and Night. Striking Matches released a new EP, Morning, in May 2019, which was their first release after leaving Capitol Records. The group released a music video for the song "Don't Hold Back" in April 2019, prior to the release of the EP. The video was directed by Casey Pierce.

The duo release the second single off their upcoming EP Noon, "Say What You Wanna," in September 2019. Noon will be released on November 15, 2019.

== Musical style ==
The duo's music has been described as being found at "that sweet spot at the intersection of country, rock and blues". Regarded as a "countrified Civil Wars/Black Keys mix", Striking Matches employ tight vocal harmonies in their guitar-driven music.

== Discography ==
=== Studio albums ===
Title	Album details	Peak chart positions	
Title	Album details	US Country	US Heat
Nothing but the Silence	Release date: March 23, 2015; Label: I.R.S. Records	25	6

EPs

Title	Album details	Peak chart positions	
Title	Album details	US Country	US Heat
Striking Matches	Release date: October 2, 2012; Label: Self-released		
Morning	Release date: May 3, 2019; Label: Tone Tree Music		
Noon	Release date: December 6, 2019; Label: Tonal Tree Music		
Night	Release date: March 27, 2020; Label: Tonal Tree Music		

=== Music videos ===
Year	Video	Director
2015	"Hanging on a Lie"	Jeff Venable
2019	"Don't Hold Back"	Casey Pierce
