= The Music of Nashville: Season 2, Volume 1 =

Soundtrack album by Various artists
- Released: December 10, 2013
- Genres: Country, Country pop, Country rock
- Length: 41:52 (Standard edition), 54:21 (Target deluxe edition)
- Label: Big Machine Records
- Producers: Michael Knox; Buddy Miller; Brett Beavers; Luke Wooten; Ross Cooperman

The Music of Nashville chronology
The Music of Nashville: Season 1, Volume 2 (2013)	The Music of Nashville: Season 2, Volume 1 (2013)	The Music of Nashville: Season 2, Volume 2 (2014)

Professional ratings
Review scores
Source	Rating
AllMusic	3.5/5 stars

The Music of Nashville: Season 2, Volume 1 is the third soundtrack album for the American musical drama television series Nashville, created by Academy Award winner Callie Khouri and starring Connie Britton as Rayna Jaymes, a legendary country music superstar, whose stardom begins fading, and Hayden Panettiere as rising teen star Juliette Barnes. The album was released on December 10, 2013 through Big Machine Records, with tracks 14–17 available on the Target deluxe edition.

== Track listing ==
Standard edition
No.	Title	Writer(s)	Performer(s)	Length
1.	"What If I Was Willing"	Billy Montana, Randy Montana, Brian Davis	Chris Carmack	3:37
2.	"Can't Get It Right"	Matthew Perryman Jones, Lily Costner	Sam Palladio	3:12
3.	"A Life That's Good"	Sarah Siskind, Ashley Monroe	Lennon & Maisy	3:21
4.	"Ball and Chain"	Tammi Lynn Kidd, Paul Kennerley	Connie Britton and Will Chase	3:20
5.	"This Town"	Jaida Dreyer, Andrew Rollins, Cory Mayo	Clare Bowen and Charles Esten	3:50
6.	"Trouble Is"	Kate York, Marv Green	Hayden Panettiere	2:33
7.	"Playin' Tricks"	Justin Davis, Sarah Zimmerman, Adam Wright	Charles Esten	3:21
8.	"Why Can't I Say Goodnight"	Angelo Petraglia, Kim Richey	Clare Bowen and Sam Palladio	3:02
9.	"Tell Me"	Dreyer, Rollins, Mayo, Jody Stevens	Aubrey Peeples	3:23
10.	"Wayfaring Stranger" (A Cappella)	Public Domain	Chaley Rose	2:04
11.	"Share with You"	Garrison Starr	Lennon & Maisy	2:00
12.	"How You Learn to Live Alone"	Mary Gauthier, Gretchen Peters	Jonathan Jackson	4:27
13.	"Can't Say No to You"	Sarah Buxton, Jedd Hughes, Gordie Sampson	Hayden Panettiere and Chris Carmack	3:40

=== Deluxe edition ===
Target deluxe edition
No.	Title	Writer(s)	Performer(s)	Length
14.	"Waitin'"	Caitlin Rose, Skylar Wilson, Mark Fredson, Jordan Lehning	Clare Bowen	2:46
15.	"Be My Girl"	John Davidson, Jacob Bryant, Derrick Southerland	Sam Palladio and Jonathan Jackson	2:38
16.	"Come See About Me"	Eddie Holland, Lamont Dozier, Brian Holland	Clare Bowen and Chaley Rose	2:57
17.	"A Life That's Good"	Siskind, Monroe	Charles Esten	3:47

== Charts ==
=== Weekly charts ===
Chart (2013)	Peak position
US Billboard 200	34
US Top Country Albums (Billboard)	7
US Soundtrack Albums (Billboard)	4

=== Year-end charts ===
Chart (2014)	Position
US Top Country Albums (Billboard)	42
US Soundtrack Albums (Billboard)	12
