= Telescope (song) =

Single by Hayden Panettiere
- Released: October 29, 2012
- Genre: Country
- Length: 3:17
- Label: Big Machine
- Songwriter(s): Hillary Lindsey; Cary Barlowe
- Producer(s): Dann Huff

Hayden Panettiere singles chronology
"Wake Up Call" (2008)	"Telescope" (2012)	"Hypnotizing" (2013)

"Telescope" is a song recorded by American actress Hayden Panettiere. The song was written by Hillary Lindsey and Cary Barlowe. It was released to country radio in October 2012 by Big Machine Records. It was the first official single from the album The Music of Nashville: Season 1 Volume 1. The album also features a version of the song recorded by sisters Lennon and Maisy Stella. The UK compilation The Music of Nashville, Season 1: The Complete Collection (aka Nashville Deluxe) also includes a version recorded live in Nashville by Panettiere. Panettiere and Lennon Stella recorded a version for the season four episode "Stop the World (And Let Me Off)," released as a digital single.

== Critical reception ==
Billy Dukes of Taste of Country gave the song three stars out of five. Dukes wrote that "Panettiere proves she can sing with the big girls, and no shortcut is taken in production" but called the song "made-for-television," stating that "lyrically, ‘Telescope’ isn’t sharp enough for a more established country star to sing." Ashley Cooke of Roughstock also gave the song three stars out of five. Cooke called it "a sassy upbeat song about a girl done wrong, with a very cute concept and catchy lyrics that stick in your head" but felt that Panettiere's voice was "a bit forced" and that the song wasn't "enough to move beyond the TV screen." Ben Foster of Country Universe gave the song a B+, calling it "cool" and "nearly irresistible." Foster wrote that the song "tackles the tried-and-true country music theme of cheating with a clever concept and a great hook" and Panettiere "rides the catchy beat with an assured performance – subtle when necessary, forceful when appropriate," but felt that "the production and background vocals are laid on a bit too thick in some places, particularly toward the end the song."

== Music video ==
The music video was directed by TK McKamy and premiered in November 2012.

== Chart performance ==
"Telescope" debuted at number 51 on the U.S. Billboard Country Airplay chart for the week of November 10, 2012. It also debuted at number 47 on the U.S. Billboard Hot Country Songs chart for the week of November 10, 2012.

Chart (2012–13)	Peak position
US Country Airplay (Billboard)	33
US Hot Country Songs (Billboard)	36
