= The Music of Nashville: Season 1, Volume 2 =

Soundtrack album by Various artists
- Released: May 7, 2013
- Genre: Country; country pop; country rock
- Length: 37:40 (Standard edition), 55:43 (Target deluxe edition)
- Label: Big Machine Records
- Producer: Dan Auerbach; T-Bone Burnett; Ross Copperman; Garth Fundis; Frank Liddell; Buddy Miller; Gabriel Witcher

The Music of Nashville chronology
The Music of Nashville: Season 1, Volume 1 (2012)	The Music of Nashville: Season 1, Volume 2 (2013)	The Music of Nashville: Season 2, Volume 1 (2014)

Professional ratings
Review scores
Source	Rating
Allmusic	3.5/5 stars

The Music of Nashville: Season 1 Volume 2 is the second soundtrack album for the American musical drama television series Nashville, created by Academy Award winner Callie Khouri and starring Connie Britton as Rayna Jaymes, a legendary country music superstar, whose stardom begins fading, and Hayden Panettiere as rising teen star Juliette Barnes. The album was released on May 7, 2013 through Big Machine Records, with tracks 12–16 available on the Target deluxe edition.

The album became the tenth best-selling soundtrack album of 2013 with 120,000 sold for the year.

== Track listing ==
Standard edition
No.	Title	Writer(s)	Performer(s)	Length
1.	"Fade into You"	Matt Jenkins, Shane McAnally, Trevor Rosen	Sam Palladio and Clare Bowen	3:31
2.	"Ho Hey"	Jeremy Fraites, Wesley Schultz	Lennon Stella and Maisy Stella	2:07
3.	"Gun for a Mouth"	David Poe	Sam Palladio	3:21
4.	"We Are Water"	Patty Griffin	Hayden Panettiere	4:33
5.	"Looking for a Place to Shine"	Natalie Hemby, Angela Lauer	Clare Bowen	2:06
6.	"Stronger Than Me"	Sarah Buxton, Kate York	Connie Britton	3:53
7.	"Bitter Memory"	Lucinda Williams	Connie Britton	3:27
8.	"Let There Be Lonely"	Laura Rogers, Lydia Rogers, Gordie Sampson	Jonathan Jackson	3:01
9.	"Hypnotizing"	Cary Barlowe, Steve Robson, Caitlyn Smith	Hayden Panettiere	3:13
10.	"I Will Fall"	Tyler James, York	Clare Bowen and Sam Palladio	3:26
11.	"Nothing in This World Will Ever Break My Heart Again"	Buxton, York	Hayden Panettiere	5:02

=== Deluxe edition ===
Target deluxe edition
No.	Title	Writer(s)	Performer(s)	Length
12.	"Consider Me"	Brendan Benson, Ashley Monroe	Hayden Panettiere	3:38
13.	"Keep Asking Why"	Erin McCarley, York	Jonathan Jackson	4:18
14.	"You Ain't Dolly (And You Ain't Porter)"	Vince Gill, Monroe	Clare Bowen and Chris Carmack	4:06
15.	"Matchbox Blues"	Blind Lemon Jefferson	Charles Esten	2:06
16.	"Shine"	Trent Dabbs, Monroe	Sam Palladio	3:51

== Charts ==
=== Weekly charts ===
Chart (2013)	Peak position
UK Compilations Albums (OCC)	9
US Billboard 200	13
US Top Country Albums (Billboard)	5
US Soundtrack Albums (Billboard)	2

=== Year-end charts ===
Chart (2013)	Position
US Top Country Albums (Billboard)	45
US Soundtrack Albums (Billboard)	12
