= Sarah Siskind =

American musician (born 1978)

- Born: Sarah Wingate; April 15, 1978 (age 48); North Carolina, U.S.
- Genres: Folk, folk rock
- Occupations: Singer, songwriter
- Instruments: Guitar, piano
- Website: sarahsiskind.com

Sarah Siskind (born April 15, 1978) is an American folk singer and songwriter.

== Career ==
Siskind grew up in North Carolina in a musical household. She learned the piano at an early age, began writing songs at age eleven and recorded her first album at fourteen.

Her debut album, Covered (2002), was released independently and included appearances by jazz guitarist Bill Frisell and Jennifer Kimball. The album's songs were about love, family, and relationships.

Her song "Simple Love" was recorded by Alison Krauss on the album A Hundred Miles or More: A Collection (Rounder, 2007) and received a Grammy Award nomination for Best Female Country Vocal Performance. She toured with Bon Iver, who often finished his concerts with her song "Lovin's for Fools".

Siskind's songs have been recorded by Jeff Austin, Brendan Benson, Madi Diaz, Gabe Dixon, Ari Hest, Wynonna Judd, Claire Lynch, Della Mae, Angaleena Presley, Maia Sharp, Randy Travis, Curtis Wright, Robert Plant and the Infamous Stringdusters.

On April 17, 2020, Siskind released her album Modern Appalachia.

== Discography ==
- Covered (2002)
- Studio.Living Room (2006)
- Say It Louder (2009)
- All Come Together Now (2010)
- Novel (2011)
- In The Mountains (2015)
- Modern Appalachia (2020)

As guest

- 2001 Beat Hollow, Fognode
- 2006 Sadlylove, Kate York
- 2006 Don't Let the Stars Keep Us Tangled Up, Cortney Tidwell
- 2008 Leavetaking, Peter Bradley Adams
- 2009 Song Up in Her Head, Sarah Jarosz
- 2010 Things That Fly, The Infamous Stringdusters
- 2011 Guitar Slinger, Vince Gill
- 2011 Follow Me Down, Sarah Jarosz
- 2012 Mindy Smith, Mindy Smith
- 2015 The Simple Truth, Jeff Austin
