= Clare Bowen =

Australian actress, singer, and dancer (born 1984)

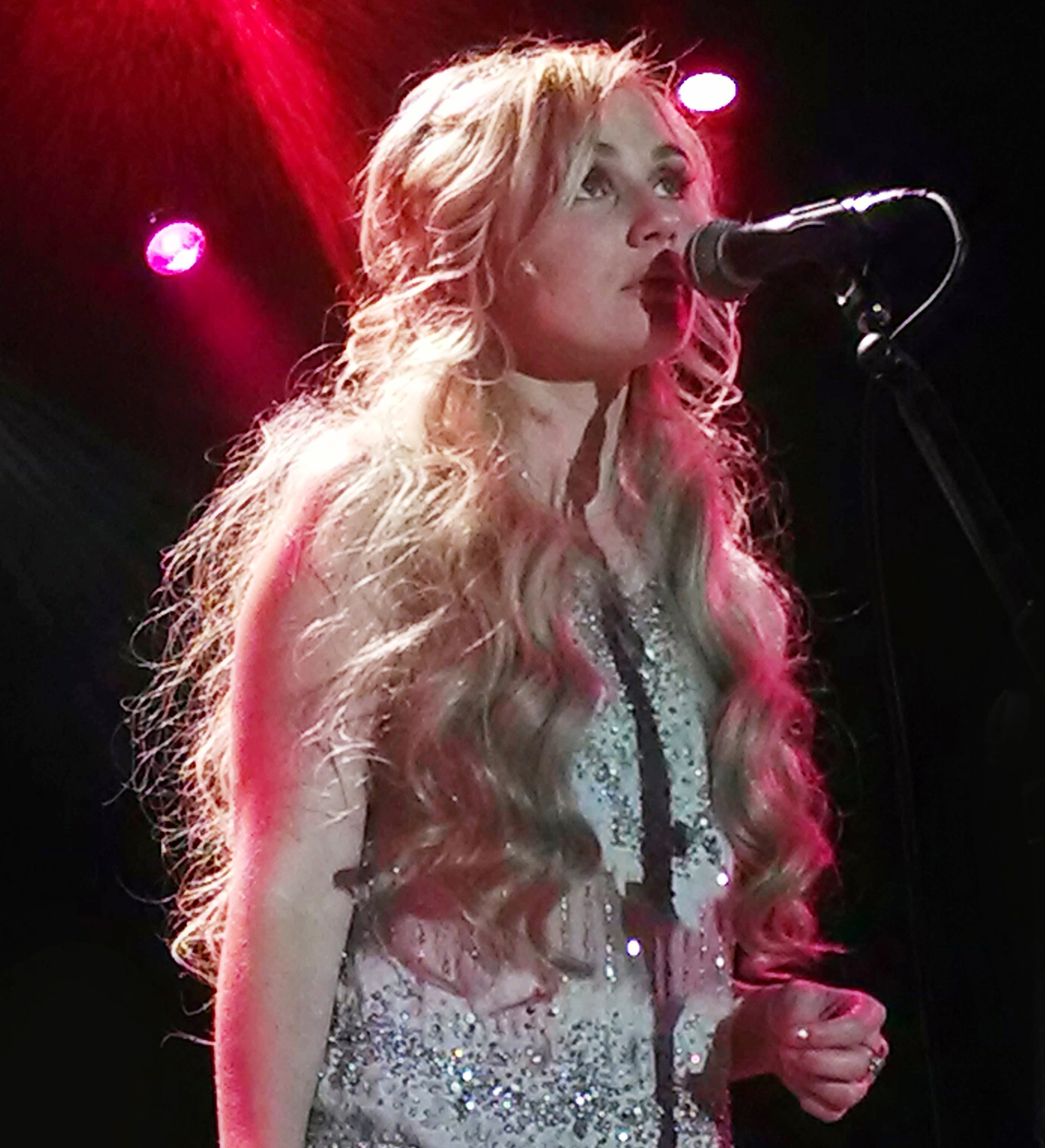
- Bowen in May 2014 in New York City, United States.
- Born: Clare Maree Bowen; 12 May 1984 (age 42); Minnamurra, New South Wales, Australia
- Education: University of Wollongong (BCA)
- Occupations: Actress, singer, dancer
- Years active: 2003–present
- Spouse: Brandon Robert Young (m. 2017)
- Website: www.clarebowenofficial.com

Clare Maree Bowen (born 12 May 1984) is an Australian actress, singer, and dancer, best known for her role as Scarlett O'Connor in the ABC/CMT musical-drama television series Nashville. Alongside her music releases from Nashville and her solo debut album, Bowen also records with her husband Brandon Young as Bowen*Young.

== Early life and education ==
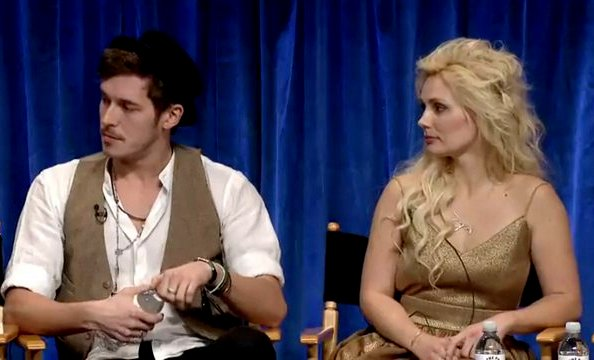
Bowen with Sam Palladio on 2013 PaleyFest

Bowen was born in Australia on 12 May 1984. Her parents Tony and Kathleen worked for Qantas and she spent time overseas as a child, including a stint with her family in Zimbabwe. Bowen is a cancer survivor, having had the disease between the ages of four and seven. She lived in Stanwell Park on the South Coast of New South Wales and attended primary school in Dulwich Hill, a suburb of Sydney. Bowen has a younger brother, Timothy, who is a musician.

Bowen attended the University of Wollongong in New South Wales, Australia, where she received a Bachelor of Creative Arts degree in 2006.

== Career ==
Bowen appeared as the female lead in the Australian drama film The Combination in 2009 and has guest starred in The Cut, Gangs of Oz, Chandon Pictures and Home and Away. In 2010, Bowen was cast in the leading role of Wendla Bergman, in the Australian production of Spring Awakening, directed by Geordie Brookman, artistically overseen by Cate Blanchett at the Sydney Theatre Company.

In 2012, Bowen landed a series regular role on the ABC drama series Nashville written by Academy Award winner Callie Khouri. The series was picked up by ABC on 11 May 2012.

On 21 January 2014, the Zac Brown Band – featuring Bowen – released a live version of their No. 1 hit from 2010, "Free", with a transition into the famous Van Morrison song "Into the Mystic".

Bowen is also preparing her first solo album, scheduled for 2015, about which she spoke in an interview with Rolling Stone: "We've recorded a couple things and I've been writing and writing and writing." Her self-titled debut album was eventually released on 31 August 2018.

On 15 September 2022, it was announced that Bowen and her husband would be releasing their debut album as a duo, recording as Bowen*Young, in early 2023 and they previewed a song titled "Skeletons".

== Personal life ==
In 2013, Bowen posed nude for the May issue of Allure magazine - alongside Naya Rivera, Jennifer Morrison, and Christa Miller.

In December 2015, Bowen became engaged to musician Brandon Robert Young, who proposed at the Grand Ole Opry. They were married on 21 October 2017.

Bowen is autistic and has ADHD, and one of her goals is to help similar people feel less alone. According to the transcript of her interview on the Neurodivergent Woman podcast, Bowen says:

"What I know now is to make sure that every single one of those people, in whatever way I can, can kind of reach out and be like, hey, hey, you're not by yourself, it's okay. You don't have to do it by yourself, it's okay. If you feel like you don't understand anything, or like nobody understands you, or like everyone's laughing but you don't get the joke, and maybe you are the joke, you can still become the person that you always dreamed of being, even if you are the butt of every joke, even if you feel like it fit anywhere.”

== Filmography ==
=== Film ===
Year	Title	Role	Notes
2009	The Combination	Sydney	
2010	The Clearing	Evelyn	Short film
2010	The Talk	Woman	
2010	The Invitation	Candice	Short film
2010	The Clinic	Ivy	
2010	10 Days to Die	Maddy McCarthy	
2011	A Burning Thing	Jen	Short film
2011	Cupid	Casey	Short film
2012	Suspended	Carla	Short film
2012	Dead Man's Burden	Martha Kirkland	
2012	Not Suitable for Children	Gypsy	
2012	The Red Valentine	The Woman	Short film

=== Television ===
Year	Title	Role	Notes
2009	The Cut	Donna Gilbertson	Episode: "A Little Bit of Biff"
2009	Chandon Pictures	Krystal	Episode: "The Lifestyle"
2009	All Saints	Holly Russell	Episode: "A Precious Waste"
2009	Gangs of Oz	Svetlana	Episode: "In from the Cold"
2010	Home and Away	Nina Bailey	4 episodes
2012–2018	Nashville	Scarlett O'Connor	Main Cast, 121 episodes
2013	Nashville: On the Record	Herself	TV special
2014	Nashville: On the Record, Volume 2	Herself	TV special
2015	Nashville: On the Record, Volume 3	Herself	TV special
2017	Nashchat	Guest host	
2020	Hungry Ghosts	Liz Stockton	Miniseries, 4 episodes
2021	Sand Dollar Cove	Pam Johnson	TV film
2022	#Xmas	Jen	TV film

=== Stage ===
Year	Title	Role	Notes
2003	Candide		
2004	Our Town	Mrs. Webb	
2005	The Good Doctor	The Mistress	
2006	Metamorphoses	Alcyone / Pomona	
2006	Peer Gynt	Peer Gynt	
2009	4 Plays About Wollongong: The War on the Hill		Illawarra Performing Arts Centre with Merrigong Theatre Company
2010	Hat's Off/Spring Awakening	Wendla Bergman	Sydney Theatre with STC

== Discography ==
=== Studio albums ===
List of studio albums, with selected chart positions and certifications
Title	Release details	Peak chart positions	
Title	Release details	UK	UK Country
Clare Bowen	Release date: 31 August 2018; Label: BMG Rights Management; Formats: CD, LP, digital download	65	1
Bowen*Young	Release date: 2024; Label: Formats: CD, LP, digital download		

=== with Nashville ===
Title	Album details	Peak chart positions			
Title	Album details	UK Compilations	US	US Country	US Soundtracks
The Music of Nashville: Season 1, Volume 1	Released: 11 December 2012 (USA); Released: 25 February 2013 (UK); Label: Big Machine Records; Format: CD, digital download	5	14	3	1
The Music of Nashville: Season 1, Volume 2	Released: 7 May 2013 (USA); Released: 20 May 2013 (UK); Label: Big Machine Records; Format: CD, digital download	9	13	5	2
The Music of Nashville, Season 1: The Complete Collection	Released: 23 September 2013 (UK); Label: Decca/Big Machine Records; Format: CD, digital download	—	—	—	—
The Music of Nashville: Season 2, Volume 1	Released: 10 December 2013 (USA); Released: 17 February 2014 (UK); Label: Big Machine Records; Format: CD, digital download	—	34	7	4
Nashville: On the Record	Released: 22 April 2014 (USA); Label: Big Machine Records; Format: digital download	—	8	2	—
Nashville: The Nashville Cast featuring Clare Bowen, Season 1	Released: 22 April 2014 (USA); Label: Big Machine Records; Format: digital download	—	—	41	17
The Music of Nashville: Season 2, Volume 2	Released: 6 May 2014 (USA); Label: Big Machine Records; Format: CD, digital download	—	13	4	2
Nashville: The Nashville Cast featuring Clare Bowen, Season 2	Released: 13 May 2014 (USA); Label: Big Machine Records; Format: digital download	—	—	—	—
Christmas with Nashville	Released: 4 November 2014 (USA); Released: 24 November 2014 (UK); Label: Big Machine Records; Format: CD, digital download	—	59	8	—
The Music of Nashville: Season 3, Volume 1	Released: 9 December 2014 (USA); Released: 20 April 2015 (UK); Label: Big Machine Records; Format: CD, digital download	—	75	10	6
Nashville: On the Record, Volume 2	Released: 23 March 2015 (USA); Label: Big Machine Records; Format: CD, digital download	—	31	3	—
The Music of Nashville: Season 3, Volume 2	Released: 12 May 2015 (USA); Released: 29 June 2015 (UK); Label: Big Machine Records; Format: CD, digital download	—	28	3	3
The Music of Nashville: Season 4, Volume 1	Released: 4 December 2015 (USA); Label: Big Machine Records; Format: CD, digital download	—	170	17	6
The Music of Nashville: Season 4, Volume 2	Released: 13 May 2016; Label: Big Machine Records; Format: CD, digital download	—	165	12	3
The Music of Nashville: Season 5, Volume 1	Released: 10 March 17; Label: Big Machine Records; Format: CD, digital download	—	65	12	8
The Music of Nashville: Season 5, Volume 2	Released: 1 June 2017; Label: Big Machine Records; Format: CD, digital download	—	—	—	—
The Music of Nashville: Season 5, Volume 3	Released: 10 August 17; Label: Big Machine Records; Format: CD, digital download	—	—	—	—
The Music of Nashville: Greatest Hits, Seasons 1-5	Released: 6 October 2017 (UK); Label: Big Machine Records; Format: CD, digital download	19	—	—	—
The Music of Nashville: Season 6, Volume 1	Released: 23 February 2018; Label: Big Machine Records, Universal; Format: CD, Digital download	—	—	—	—
The Music of Nashville: Season 6, Volume 2	Released: 27 July 2018; Label: Big Machine Records, Universal; Format: CD, Digital download	—	—	—	—
The Best of Nashville	Released: 2 November 2018; Label: Big Machine Records; Format: CD, Digital download	—	—	—	—
"—" denotes releases that did not chart

=== Singles ===
Year	Single	Peak chart positions		Album
Year	Single	US Country	US	Album
2012	"If I Didn't Know Better" (with Sam Palladio)^{A}	27	102	The Music of Nashville: Season 1 Volume 1
2012	"Fade into You" (with Sam Palladio)	25	92	The Music of Nashville: Season 1 Volume 2
2012	"I Will Fall" (with Sam Palladio)	45	—	The Music of Nashville: Season 1 Volume 2
2013	"Change Your Mind" (with Sam Palladio)	35	—	The Music of Nashville, Season 1: The Complete Collection
2013	"Casino" (with Sam Palladio)	48	—	The Music of Nashville, Season 1: The Complete Collection
2013	"This Town" (with Charles Esten)	41	—	The Music of Nashville: Season 2, Volume 1
2014	"Lately" (with Sam Palladio)	42	—	The Music of Nashville: Season 2, Volume 2
2014	"Black Roses"^{A}	29	116	The Music of Nashville: Season 2, Volume 2
2015	"I Will Never Let You Know" (with Sam Palladio)	39	—	—N/a
2015	"Wake Up When It's Over" (with Sam Palladio)	49	—	—N/a
2017	"Love Steps In"	—	—	Clare Bowen
2017	"Little By Little"	—	—	Clare Bowen
2018	"Let It Rain"	—	—	Clare Bowen
2020	"Love Will Remain" (with Ronan Keating)	—	—	Twenty Twenty
2022	"Skeletons"	—	—	Bowen*Young
"—" denotes releases that did not chart

- ^{A}Did not enter the Hot 100 but charted on Bubbling Under Hot 100 Singles.

=== Music videos ===
Year	Video
2017	"Love Steps In"
2018	"Let It Rain"

== Style and inspiration ==
Sonically, Bowen's music fits the Americana genre but also contains elements of pop, folk, country and adult contemporary music.

When asked which musicians inspire her music, Bowen stated "Dolly Parton is probably the biggest one. She tells such wonderful stories and she’s so honest and she’s her. She makes fun of herself. She knows how to be silly and she knows how to be serious. She can lift people up after she’s told them a really heavy story. I think she’s just a really marvellous storyteller. She’s always been a big inspiration to me". She also added that she "loved the way Alison Krauss sings and the stories she tells" and professes her love of Johnny Cash and June Carter Cash, Australian pop star Tina Arena and musical theatre legend Stephen Sondheim. Bowen asserts that Buddy Miller is her "ultimate music mentor" as he is "the one who taught [her] to use a microphone when [she] first got to Nashville", adding that he and his wife Julie "make such beautiful music together".
