= Lennon & Maisy =

Canadian music duo

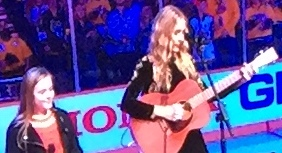
- Lennon & Maisy at the 2016 NHL All-Star Game.

Background information
- Origin: Oshawa, Ontario, Canada
- Genres: Country, pop
- Years active: 2012–present
- Labels: Lennon & Maisy
- Past members: Lennon Stella; Maisy Stella
- Website: www.lennonandmaisy.com

Lennon & Maisy are a Canadian music duo composed of sisters Lennon Stella and Maisy Stella. They are best known for their roles as Maddie and Daphne Conrad in the ABC/CMT musical drama series Nashville (2012–2018).

They were both born in Oshawa, Ontario, but later resided in Nashville. They are the daughters of singer-songwriter duo MaryLynne and Brad Stella, who perform as the Stellas.

== Early life ==
Lennon and Maisy Stella grew up on a secluded farm in Claremont, Ontario. Born into a musical family, with both parents and other family members in the music business, the girls became interested in the business from a very early age. Lennon got her first guitar when she was five and was taught by her father, an experienced guitarist. Although neither of them has ever received lessons or professional vocal or instrumental training, they both play numerous instruments and sing in two-part harmony. Having both turned to music for entertainment, the girls wrote songs together in their early years and played at various shows and festivals alongside their parents’ duo the Stellas. The family moved to Nashville from Canada in 2009 so Brad and MaryLynne could further their music career. The family currently resides in Brentwood, Tennessee.

== Career ==
Although music was the girls' early passion, Maisy had always been interested in acting and had been featured in several commercials and music videos when she was younger. So, when their mom became aware of a role in a new ABC show that was being filmed in Nashville, Maisy auditioned. At the final stages of the auditioning process, the casting agents learned of Maisy's older sister Lennon and decided that both girls would be cast on the show. Lennon and Maisy began starring in the ABC drama Nashville in October 2012. However, prior to appearing on Nashville, the girls had to try to increase publicity so they could apply for their work visas. They achieved this and uploaded a cover of Robyn's "Call Your Girlfriend," which went viral overnight. After this video was posted, they were invited to New York City to perform their cover on Good Morning America. From that moment, their careers took off. Their YouTube channel now has over 97 million views and nearly 727,000 subscribers.

Lennon & Maisy performed The Lumineers' "Ho Hey" on season one of Nashville. Their version reached the Top 40 on the Billboard Hot Country Songs chart in April 2013. Later that year, Lennon & Maisy were invited to open for and present Taylor Swift with the Pinnacle Award at the CMA Awards.

Early in 2014, they recorded the song "Love" for a Coop (Switzerland) Naturaplan TV commercial. The song rose to number 1 on the Swiss iTunes chart and was the number 2 most downloaded song in Switzerland for three consecutive weeks.

The duo performed at the St. Jude Country Music Marathon and Half Marathon Post Race Concert with Charles Esten on April 26, 2014, and they have performed at the Grand Ole Opry more than a dozen times. They released an EP called Live YouTube Sessions in August 2012. Also in 2012, they put out a Christmas single called "Christmas Coming Home". In 2014, they released a cover of "That's What's Up", a song originally by Edward Sharpe and the Magnetic Zeros. The sisters have been featured on numerous soundtrack albums for Nashville.

Lennon & Maisy have been featured in O, The Oprah Magazine, Glamour, People, The Globe and Mail, The Huffington Post and numerous other publications.

Michael Kors invited them to his show at New York Fashion Week. They weren't able to attend, so they recorded a video for him of them playing Corey Hart's "Sunglasses at Night." The duo released a cover of the Coldplay song "Up&Up" in January 2017 along with a video.

In 2017, Maisy performed "Riding Free" for the Netflix original series Spirit Riding Free. The Music video was released on May 25, 2017.

== Discography ==
=== Albums ===
Title	Details
Lennon and Maisy (Live YouTube Sessions)	Release date: August 6, 2012; Label: self-released

=== Singles ===
Year	Single	Peak chart positions				Album
Year	Single	US Country	US Country Airplay	US	SWI	Album
2013	"Ho Hey"	32	47	107	—	The Music of Nashville: Season 1 Volume 2
2013	"A Life That's Good"	38	—	—	—	The Music of Nashville: Season 2, Volume 1
2014	"Love"	—	—	—	2	—N/a
2014	"That's What's Up"	42	—	—	—	—N/a
2015	"Boom Clap"	—	—	121	—	—N/a
"—" denotes releases that did not chart

=== Songs ===
Year	Song	Album
2012	"Call Your Girlfriend" (Live)	Lennon and Maisy (Live YouTube Sessions)
2012	"I Won't Give Up" (Live)	Lennon and Maisy (Live YouTube Sessions)
2012	"Headlock" (Live)	Lennon and Maisy (Live YouTube Sessions)
2012	"Telescope"	The Music of Nashville: Season 1 Volume 1
2012	"Christmas Coming Home"	—N/a
2013	"Ho Hey"	The Music of Nashville: Season 1 Volume 2
2013	"A Life That's Good"	The Music of Nashville: Season 2, Volume 1
2013	"Share with You"	The Music of Nashville: Season 2, Volume 1
2014	"That's What's Up"	—N/a
2014	"Believing"	The Music of Nashville: Season 2, Volume 2
2014	"Joy Parade"	The Music of Nashville: Season 2, Volume 2
2014	"The Blues Have Blown Away"	—N/a
2015	"Boom Clap"	—N/a
2017	"Sanctuary" (with Charles Esten)	The Music of Nashville: Season 5, Volume 1
2018	"Leavin's Not the Only Way to Go"	King of the Road: A Tribute to Roger Miller
