= Arum Rae =

American singer-songwriter

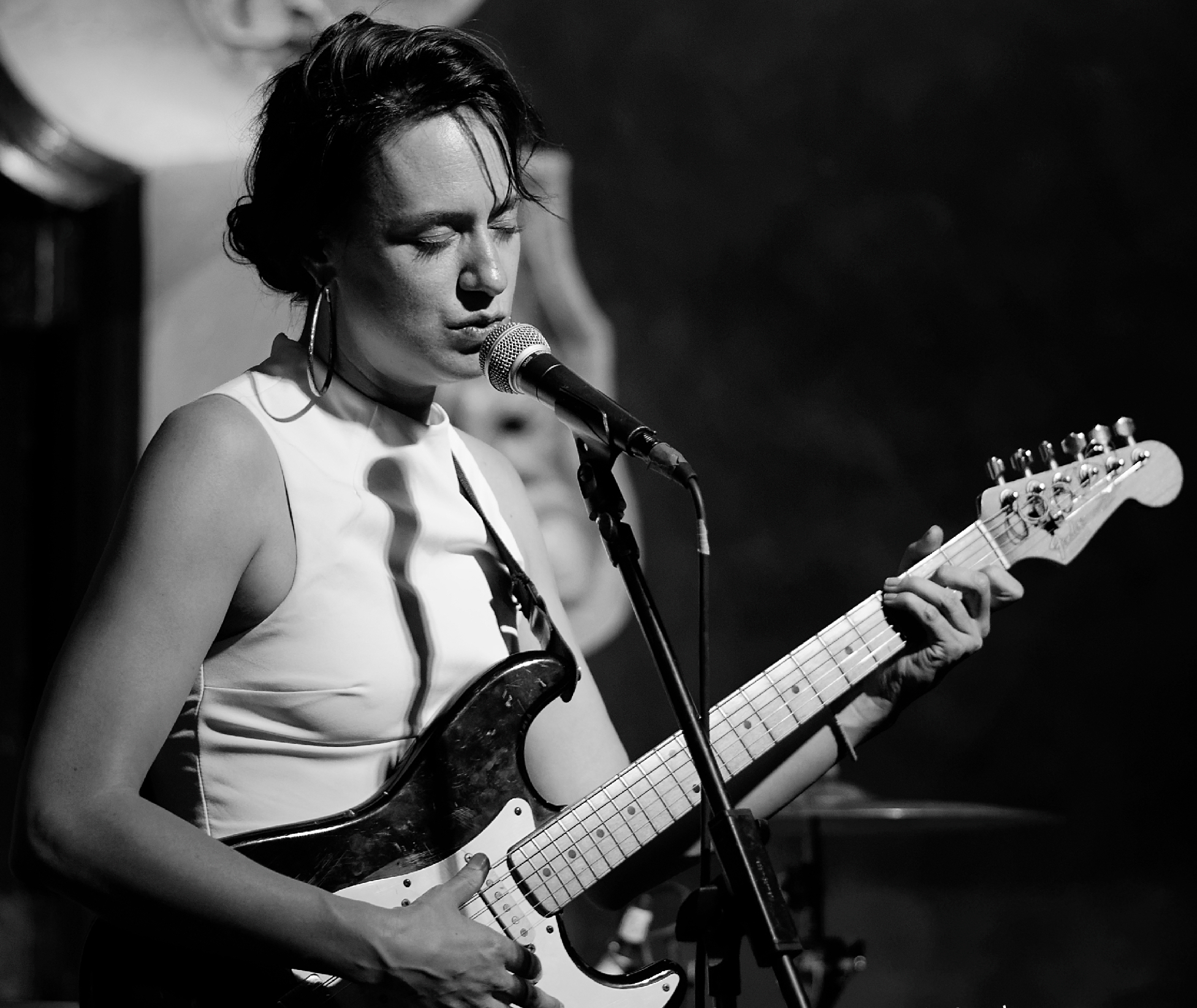
- Performing in 2016

Background information
- Also known as: White Dress
- Born: Arum Rae Valkonen; August 25; Colorado Springs, Colorado, U.S.
- Origin: Brooklyn, New York, U.S.
- Genres: Americana, country blues
- Occupations: Singer, songwriter
- Years active: 2014–present
- Label: Secret Road
- Website: arumrae.com

Arum Rae (Latin for waterlily) is an American singer-songwriter based in Brooklyn, New York. Her full birth name is Arum Rae Valkonen (valkoinen means "white" in Finnish) and she was born in Colorado Springs, Colorado. Her sound is heavily influenced by jazz singers like Ella Fitzgerald and Nina Simone. Her style blends heavy, nocturnal beats with auto-tuned soul singing. Arum began performing by driving up to three hours from Virginia to play at various open mics in Washington, D.C., and Frederick, Maryland, which would then open the door for her to return as an opener, and finally performing as the headlining act. Arum now resides in New York City.

== College and early successes ==
Arum Rae attended Berklee College of Music in Boston, where she majored in music business. She began writing original music her senior year. After graduating, Arum honed her songwriting skills and started playing for the community in Rockbridge County, Virginia. Arum Rae has worked with many notable producers such as Ken Lewis, Jim Eno, John Congleton, and Sanford Livingston. Arum found success in sync licensing, leading to placement of her song "What Good Is A Heart" on CW's The Vampire Diaries and "Waving Wild" on ABC's Pretty Little Liars. Arum Rae and The Civil Wars's John Paul White co-wrote “If I Didn’t Know Better”. The song was featured on ABC's Nashville, landing it a spot on the Billboard Charts.

== Recent projects ==
Arum Rae's debut record, Too Young To Sing the Blues, featured Todd Sickafoose on upright bass, drummer Andrew Borger, Larry Saltzman on electric and slide guitar and Geralde Menke on pedal steel. The record was made in Brooklyn, New York, at Bushwick Studios and was produced by Michael Bongiorno and Steve West. In March 2014, she released the Warranted Queen EP with Sanford Livingston. Arum Rae's music video for "Gold" premiered via Paste Magazine in June 2014. She then released Waving Wild EP in November 2014, with record producer John Congleton. Her most recent issue was the Loners EP, a collaboration with Ken Lewis, and released through Secret Road Records on July 15, 2016.
