= The Music of Nashville: Season 1, Volume 1 =

Soundtrack album by Various artists
- Released: December 11, 2012
- Recorded: 2012
- Genres: Country; country pop; country rock
- Length: 36:12 (Standard edition)
- Label: Big Machine Records
- Producers: Callie Khouri; T-Bone Burnett; Michael Knox; Dann Huff; Peter DiCecco; Ross Copperman; Steve Buchanan

The Music of Nashville chronology
| The Music of Nashville: Season 1, Volume 1 (2012) | The Music of Nashville: Season 1, Volume 2 (2013) |

The Music of Nashville: Season 1, Volume 1 is the debut soundtrack album for the American musical drama television series Nashville, created by Academy Award winner Callie Khouri and starring Connie Britton as Rayna Jaymes, a legendary country music superstar, whose stardom begins fading, and Hayden Panettiere as rising teen star Juliette Barnes. The album was released December 11, 2012, through Big Machine Records.

The album debuted at number 14 on the U.S. Billboard 200, and at number 4 on the Top Country Albums chart, selling 56,000 copies in its first week of release. The album sold a further 198,000 copies in 2013, making it the sixth best-selling soundtrack album of the year.

Professional ratings
Review scores
| Source | Rating |
|---|---|
| Allmusic | 3.5/5 stars |
| Barnes & Noble | 4/5 stars |
| Common Sense Media | 4/5 stars |

== Track listing ==
Standard edition
| No. | Title | Writer(s) | Performer(s) | Length |
|---|---|---|---|---|
| 1. | "Buried Under" | Chris DeStefano, Natalie Hemby | Connie Britton | 3:03 |
| 2. | "If I Didn't Know Better" | John Paul White, Arum Rae | Sam Palladio and Clare Bowen | 2:57 |
| 3. | "Undermine" | Trent Dabbs, Kacey Musgraves | Hayden Panettiere and Charles Esten | 3:59 |
| 4. | "Sideshow" | Arron Scherz, Brad Tursi | Charles Esten | 3:03 |
| 5. | "Wrong Song" | Sonya Isaacs, Jimmy Yeary, Marv Green | Connie Britton and Hayden Panettiere | 3:10 |
| 6. | "No One Will Ever Love You" | Steve McEwan, White | Connie Britton and Charles Esten | 3:42 |
| 7. | "Twist of Barbwire" | Elvis Costello | Jonathan Jackson | 3:04 |
| 8. | "Love Like Mine" | Kelly Archer, Justin Weaver, Emily Shackelton | Hayden Panettiere | 3:22 |
| 9. | "Telescope" | Hillary Lindsey, Cary Barlowe | Lennon Stella and Maisy Stella | 2:27 |
| 10. | "When the Right One Comes Along" | Justin Davis, Georgia Middleman, Sarah Zimmerman | Clare Bowen and Sam Palladio | 3:49 |
| 11. | "Telescope" (radio mix) | Lindsey, Barlowe | Hayden Panettiere | 3:17 |

=== Deluxe edition ===
Target deluxe edition
| No. | Title | Writer(s) | Performer(s) | Length |
|---|---|---|---|---|
| 12. | "I'll Be There (If You Ever Want Me)" | Ray Price, Rusty Gabbard | Sam Palladio | 2:49 |
| 13. | "Love's Ring of Fire" | June Carter, Merle Kilgore | Clare Bowen | 1:59 |
| 14. | "Undermine" (acoustic version) | Dabbs, Musgraves | Hayden Panettiere and Charles Esten | 1:53 |
| 15. | "Changing Ground" | Gillian Welch | Connie Britton | 2:27 |

== Charts ==
=== Weekly charts ===
| Chart (2012) | Peak position |
|---|---|
| US Billboard 200 | 14 |
| US Top Country Albums (Billboard) | 3 |
| US Billboard Top Soundtracks | 1 |

Chart (2013)
| UK Top 40 Compilations | 5 |

=== Year-end charts ===
| Chart (2013) | Position |
|---|---|
| US Billboard 200 | 93 |
| US Top Country Albums (Billboard) | 22 |
