= List of Nashville episodes =

Nashville is an American musical drama television series. It was created by Academy Award winner Callie Khouri and produced by R.J. Cutler, Khouri, Dee Johnson, Steve Buchanan and Connie Britton. The series stars Connie Britton as Rayna Jaymes, a legendary country music superstar whose stardom is beginning to fade, and Hayden Panettiere as rising star Juliette Barnes. The series premiered on ABC on October 10, 2012. In May 2016, ABC canceled the series after four seasons; however, the next month, CMT picked the series up for a fifth season.

The pilot episode received much acclaim from critics, specifically praising Khouri's writing, casting, and the performances of Britton and Panettiere. Britton was nominated for the 2012 Golden Globe Award for Best Actress – Television Series Drama and the Primetime Emmy Award for Outstanding Lead Actress in a Drama Series, and Panettiere for Golden Globe Award for Best Supporting Actress, while the series was nominated for Favorite New TV Drama at the 39th People's Choice Awards, for Best Screenplay at 2013 Writers Guild of America Award and four Satellite Awards. Panettiere received a second Best Supporting Actress nomination at the 71st Golden Globe Awards. At the 6th Critics' Choice Television Awards, Panettiere was nominated for Best Supporting Actress in a Drama Series and Jonathan Jackson was nominated for Best Supporting Actor in a Drama Series.

On November 17, 2017, it was confirmed that the sixth season would be the series' final season. During the course of the series, 124 episodes of Nashville aired over six seasons, between October 12, 2012, and July 26, 2018.

== Series overview ==
Season	Episodes		Originally released		
Season	Episodes		First released	Last released	Network
1	21		October 10, 2012	May 22, 2013	ABC
2	22		September 25, 2013	May 14, 2014	ABC
3	22		September 24, 2014	May 13, 2015	ABC
4	21		September 23, 2015	May 25, 2016	ABC
5	22	11	December 15, 2016	March 9, 2017	CMT
5	22	11	June 1, 2017	August 10, 2017	CMT
6	16	8	December 19, 2017	February 22, 2018	CMT
6	16	8	June 7, 2018	July 26, 2018	CMT

== Episodes ==
=== Season 1 (2012–13) ===
No. overall	No. in season	Title	Directed by	Written by	Original release date	US viewers (millions)
1	1	"Pilot"	R.J. Cutler	Callie Khouri	October 10, 2012	8.93
2	2	"I Can't Help It (If I'm Still in Love with You)"	R.J. Cutler	Callie Khouri	October 17, 2012	6.74
3	3	"Someday You'll Call My Name"	Michael Engler	Liz Tigelaar	October 24, 2012	6.54
4	4	"We Live in Two Different Worlds"	Paul McCrane	Todd Ellis Kessler	October 31, 2012	5.74
5	5	"Move It on Over"	Lesli Linka Glatter	David Marshall Grant	November 7, 2012	6.07
6	6	"You're Gonna Change (Or I'm Gonna Leave)"	David Petrarca	Meredith Lavender & Marcie Ulin	November 14, 2012	5.93
7	7	"Lovesick Blues"	Mimi Leder	Wendy Calhoun	November 28, 2012	5.69
8	8	"Where He Leads Me"	Wendey Stanzler	Jason George	December 5, 2012	5.95
9	9	"Be Careful of Stones That You Throw"	Paul McCrane	David Gould	January 9, 2013	5.92
10	10	"I'm Sorry for You My Friend"	Sanaa Hamri	Dana Greenblatt	January 16, 2013	6.54
11	11	"You Win Again"	Paul Edwards	Liz Tigelaar	January 23, 2013	5.51
12	12	"I've Been Down That Road Before"	Stephen Cragg	Meredith Lavender & Marcie Ulin	February 6, 2013	5.30
13	13	"There'll Be No Teardrops Tonight"	Eric Stoltz	Todd Ellis Kessler & David Marshall Grant	February 13, 2013	5.74
14	14	"Dear Brother"	Jonathan Pontell	Nancy Miller & Dana Greenblatt	February 27, 2013	5.20
15	15	"When You're Tired of Breaking Other Hearts"	Paul McCrane	Jason George & David Gould	March 27, 2013	5.18
16	16	"I Saw the Light"	Julie Hébert	Wendy Calhoun	April 3, 2013	5.54
17	17	"My Heart Would Know"	Sanaa Hamri	Mollie Bickley St. John	April 10, 2013	5.96
18	18	"Take These Chains from My Heart"	Eric Stoltz	Meredith Lavender & Marcie Ulin	May 1, 2013	5.27
19	19	"Why Don't You Love Me"	Stephen Cragg	Todd Ellis Kessler	May 8, 2013	5.38
20	20	"A Picture from Life's Other Side"	Michael Waxman	Dee Johnson	May 15, 2013	5.56
21	21	"I'll Never Get Out of This World Alive"	Callie Khouri	Callie Khouri	May 22, 2013	6.02

=== Season 2 (2013–14) ===
No. overall	No. in season	Title	Directed by	Written by	Original release date	US viewers (millions)
22	1	"I Fall to Pieces"	Michael Waxman	Dee Johnson	September 25, 2013	6.50
23	2	"Never No More"	Callie Khouri	Meredith Lavender & Marcie Ulin	October 2, 2013	5.98
24	3	"I Don't Wanna Talk About It Now"	Paul McCrane	Tyler Bensinger	October 9, 2013	5.84
25	4	"You're No Angel Yourself"	Julie Hébert	Wendy Calhoun	October 16, 2013	5.76
26	5	"Don't Open That Door"	Michael Grossman	Dana Greenblatt	October 23, 2013	5.46
27	6	"It Must Be You"	Kate Woods	Monica Macer	October 30, 2013	5.25
28	7	"She's Got You"	Mario Van Peebles	Debra Fordham	November 13, 2013	5.52
29	8	"Hanky Panky Woman"	Eric Stoltz	David Gould	November 20, 2013	5.75
30	9	"I'm Tired of Pretending"	Kevin Dowling	David Handelman	December 4, 2013	5.70
31	10	"Tomorrow Never Comes"	Patrick Norris	Meredith Lavender & Marcie Ulin	December 11, 2013	5.18
32	11	"I'll Keep Climbing"	Callie Khouri	Tyler Bensinger	January 15, 2014	5.10
33	12	"Just for What I Am"	Stephen Cragg	Ben St John & Mollie Bickley St John	January 22, 2014	5.03
34	13	"It's All Wrong, But It's All Right"	Bethany Rooney	Debra Fordham	January 29, 2014	5.28
35	14	"Too Far Gone"	Patrick Norris	Monica Macer	February 5, 2014	5.16
36	15	"They Don't Make 'Em Like My Daddy Anymore"	Patrick Norris	Monica Macer	February 26, 2014	4.77
37	16	"Guilty Street"	David Grossman	Sibyl Gardner	March 5, 2014	5.09
38	17	"We've Got Things to Do"	Ron Underwood	Dana Greenblatt	March 12, 2014	5.08
39	18	"Your Wild Life's Gonna Get You Down"	Julie Hébert	David Gould	March 26, 2014	5.19
40	19	"Crazy"	Jean de Segonzac	Debra Fordham	April 2, 2014	5.18
41	20	"Your Good Girl's Gonna Go Bad"	Mario Van Peebles	Meredith Lavender & Marcie Ulin	April 30, 2014	4.62
42	21	"All or Nothing with Me"	Michael Waxman	Dee Johnson	May 7, 2014	4.70
43	22	"On the Other Hand"	Callie Khouri	Callie Khouri	May 14, 2014	5.24

=== Season 3 (2014–15) ===
No. overall	No. in season	Title	Directed by	Written by	Original release date	US viewers (millions)
44	1	"That's Me Without You"	Callie Khouri	Dee Johnson	September 24, 2014	5.80
45	2	"How Far Down Can I Go?"	Mario Van Peebles	Meredith Lavender & Marcie Ulin	October 1, 2014	5.34
46	3	"I Can't Get Over You to Save My Life"	Stephen Cragg	David Gould	October 8, 2014	5.61
47	4	"I Feel Sorry for Me"	Elodie Keene	Debra Fordham	October 15, 2014	5.02
48	5	"Road Happy"	Arlene Sanford	Dana Greenblatt	October 22, 2014	5.37
49	6	"Nobody Said It Was Going to Be Easy"	Thomas Carter	Taylor Hamra	October 29, 2014	5.59
50	7	"I'm Coming Home to You"	Mike Listo	Monica Macer	November 12, 2014	5.66
51	8	"You're Lookin' at Country"	Eric Close	Geoffrey Nauffts	November 19, 2014	5.52
52	9	"Two Sides to Every Story"	Stephen Cragg	Ben St. John & Mollie Bickley St. John	December 3, 2014	5.26
53	10	"First to Have a Second Chance"	Callie Khouri	Meredith Lavender & Marcie Ulin	December 10, 2014	5.65
54	11	"I'm Not That Good at Goodbye"	Jan Eliasberg	Debra Fordham	February 4, 2015	5.05
55	12	"I've Got Reasons to Hate You"	Jean de Segonzac	Sibyl Gardner	February 11, 2015	5.18
56	13	"I'm Lost Between Right and Wrong"	Michael Lohmann	David Gould	February 18, 2015	4.72
57	14	"Somebody Pick Up My Pieces"	Stephen Cragg	Dana Greenblatt	February 25, 2015	4.86
58	15	"That's the Way Love Goes"	Callie Khouri	Callie Khouri	March 4, 2015	5.31
59	16	"I Can't Keep Away From You"	Mike Listo	Taylor Hamra	April 1, 2015	5.05
60	17	"This Just Ain't a Good Day for Leavin'"	Michael Lohmann	Paul Keables	April 8, 2015	4.61
61	18	"Nobody Knows But Me"	Callie Khouri	David Gould & Monica Macer	April 15, 2015	4.62
62	19	"The Storm Has Just Begun"	Nelson McCormick	Dana Greenblatt & Geoffrey Nauffts	April 22, 2015	5.32
63	20	"Time Changes Things"	Arlene Sanford	Debra Fordham	April 29, 2015	4.70
64	21	"Is the Better Part Over?"	Julie Hébert	Meredith Lavender & Marcie Ulin	May 6, 2015	4.99
65	22	"Before You Go Make Sure You Know"	Callie Khouri	Dee Johnson & Callie Khouri	May 13, 2015	4.65

=== Season 4 (2015–16) ===
No. overall	No. in season	Title	Directed by	Written by	Original release date	US viewers (millions)
66	1	"Can't Let Go"	Callie Khouri	Meredith Lavender & Marcie Ulin	September 23, 2015	4.91
67	2	"'Til the Pain Outwears the Shame"	Jean de Segonzac	David Gould	September 30, 2015	4.72
68	3	"How Can I Help You Say Goodbye?"	Stephen Cragg	Debra Fordham	October 7, 2015	4.36
69	4	"The Slender Threads That Bind Us Here"	Joanna Kerns	Monica Macer	October 14, 2015	4.54
70	5	"Stop the World (And Let Me Off)"	Jan Eliasberg	Meredith Lavender & Marcie Ulin	October 21, 2015	4.47
71	6	"Please Help Me, I'm Fallin'"	Callie Khouri	Taylor Hamra	October 28, 2015	4.18
72	7	"Can't Get Used to Losing You"	Eric Close	Dana Greenblatt	November 11, 2015	4.55
73	8	"Unguarded Moments"	Ron Underwood	Paul Keables	November 18, 2015	4.44
74	9	"Three's a Crowd"	Mike Listo	Geoffrey Nauffts	December 2, 2015	4.17
75	10	"We've Got Nothing But Love to Prove"	Arlene Sanford	Debra Fordham	December 9, 2015	4.14
76	11	"Forever and for Always"	Stephen Cragg	Monica Macer & Dana Greenblatt	March 16, 2016	4.22
77	12	"How Does It Feel to be Free?"	Steve Robin	Ben St. John & Mollie Bickley St. John	March 23, 2016	4.10
78	13	"If I Could Do It All Again"	Callie Khouri	Sibyl Gardner	March 30, 2016	3.84
79	14	"What I Cannot Change"	Lily Mariye	Taylor Hamra	April 6, 2016	4.04
80	15	"When There's a Fire in Your Heart"	Michael Lohmann	Meredith Lavender & Marcie Ulin	April 13, 2016	4.12
81	16	"Didn't Expect It to Go Down This Way"	Mike Listo	Paul Keables	April 20, 2016	3.71
82	17	"Baby Come Home"	Jet Wilkinson	David Gould	April 27, 2016	3.77
83	18	"The Trouble with the Truth"	Michael Lohmann	Valerie Chu	May 4, 2016	3.89
84	19	"After You've Gone"	Bethany Rooney	Debra Fordham	May 11, 2016	3.94
85	20	"It's Sure Gonna Hurt"	Mike Listo	Taylor Hamra	May 18, 2016	3.72
86	21	"Maybe You'll Appreciate Me Someday"	Callie Khouri	Meredith Lavender & Marcie Ulin	May 25, 2016	4.19

=== Season 5 (2016–17) ===
No. overall	No. in season	Title	Directed by	Written by	Original release date	US viewers (millions)
Part 1
87	1	"The Wayfaring Stranger"	Callie Khouri	Story by : Edward Zwick and Marshall Herskovitz; Teleplay by : Marshall Herskovitz	December 15, 2016	2.89
88	2	"Back in Baby's Arms"	Stephen Cragg	Callie Khouri	January 5, 2017	1.20
89	3	"Let's Put it Back Together Again"	Mike Binder	Geoffrey Nauffts	January 12, 2017	1.11
90	4	"Leap of Faith"	Lily Mariye	Savannah Dooley	January 19, 2017	0.96
91	5	"Love Hurts"	Ron Lagomarsino	Jesse Zwick	January 26, 2017	0.93
92	6	"A Little Bit Stronger"	Stephen Cragg	Richard Kramer	February 2, 2017	0.75
93	7	"Hurricane"	Dan Lerner	Liberty Godshall	February 9, 2017	0.77
94	8	"Stand Beside Me"	Mike Binder	Matthew Ross	February 16, 2017	0.83
95	9	"If Tomorrow Never Comes"	Callie Khouri	Geoffrey Nauffts	February 23, 2017	0.93
96	10	"I'll Fly Away"	Dan Lerner	Liberty Godshall	March 2, 2017	1.12
97	11	"Fire and Rain"	Timothy Busfield	Jesse Zwick	March 9, 2017	0.97
Part 2
98	12	"Back in the Saddle Again"	Dawn Wilkinson	Savannah Dooley	June 1, 2017	0.78
99	13	"'Til I Can Make It On My Own"	Michael Lohmann	Scott Saccoccio	June 8, 2017	0.69
100	14	"(Now and Then There's) A Fool Such as I"	John Carrafa	Callie Khouri	June 15, 2017	0.75
101	15	"A Change Would Do You Good"	Devon Gummersall	Matthew Ross	June 22, 2017	0.73
102	16	"Not Ready to Make Nice"	Allan Arkush	Troy Putney	June 29, 2017	0.78
103	17	"Ghost in This House"	Maggie Greenwald	Richard Kramer	July 6, 2017	0.71
104	18	"The Night Before (Life Goes On)"	Michael Goi	Geoffrey Nauffts	July 13, 2017	0.63
105	19	"You Can't Lose Me"	Jesse Zwick	Savannah Dooley	July 20, 2017	0.72
106	20	"Speed Trap Town"	Jet Wilkinson	Jesse Zwick	July 27, 2017	0.72
107	21	"Farther On"	Michael Lohmann	Liberty Godhsall	August 3, 2017	0.74
108	22	"Reasons to Quit"	Callie Khouri	Scott Saccoccio	August 10, 2017	0.68

=== Season 6 (2017–18) ===
No. overall	No. in season	Title	Directed by	Written by	Original release date	US viewers (millions)
Part 1
109	1	"New Strings"	Timothy Busfield	Scott Saccoccio	December 19, 2017 (online); January 4, 2018 (CMT)	0.87
110	2	"Second Chances"	Mike Binder	Jesse Zwick	January 11, 2018	0.78
111	3	"Jump Then Fall"	Allan Arkush	Savannah Dooley	January 18, 2018	0.73
112	4	"That's My Story"	Lily Mariye	Geoffrey Nauffts	January 25, 2018	0.80
113	5	"Where the Night Goes"	Devon Gummersall	Liberty Godshall	February 1, 2018	0.72
114	6	"Beneath Still Waters"	Dan Lerner	Troy Putney	February 8, 2018	0.66
115	7	"Can't Help But Wonder Where I'm Bound"	Allan Arkush	Tim Olshefski	February 15, 2018	0.71
116	8	"Sometimes You Just Can't Win"	Michael Lohmann	Scott Saccoccio	February 22, 2018	0.80
Part 2
117	9	"Pick Yourself Up"	Jesse Zwick	Jesse Zwick	June 7, 2018	0.72
118	10	"Two Sparrows in a Hurricane"	Ellen S. Pressman	Michael Weintraub	June 14, 2018	0.76
119	11	"No Place That Far"	Dawn Wilkinson	Savannah Dooley	June 21, 2018	0.75
120	12	"The House That Built Me"	Timothy Busfield	Geoffrey Nauffts	June 28, 2018	0.67
121	13	"Strong Enough to Bend"	Dan Lerner	Troy Putney	July 5, 2018	0.70
122	14	"For the Sake of the Song"	Michael Lohmann	Scott Saccoccio	July 12, 2018	0.62
123	15	"I Don't Want to Lose You Yet"	Allan Arkush	Liberty Godshall	July 19, 2018	0.71
124	16	"Beyond the Sunset"	Callie Khouri	Jesse Zwick	July 26, 2018	0.88

== Specials ==
No.	Title	Aired between	Original release date	US viewers (millions)
1	"The Whole Story"	"Where He Leads Me" "Be Careful of Stones That You Throw"	January 2, 2013	3.94
2	"On the Record"	"Crazy" "Your Good Girl's Gonna Go Bad"	April 23, 2014	4.33
3	"On the Record 2"	"That's The Way Love Goes" "I Can't Keep Away From You"	March 25, 2015	4.02
4	"On the Record 3"	"We've Got Nothing But Love to Prove" "Forever and for Always"	December 16, 2015	2.52
