= Nashville season 3 =

2014–2015 season of American TV series

Nashville
- Season 3
- Season 3 DVD cover
- Starring: Connie Britton; Hayden Panettiere; Clare Bowen; Chris Carmack; Will Chase; Eric Close; Charles Esten; Oliver Hudson; Jonathan Jackson; Sam Palladio; Lennon Stella; Maisy Stella
- No. of episodes: 22

Release
- Original network: ABC
- Original release: September 24, 2014 – May 13, 2015

Season chronology
- ← Previous; Season 2 Next → Season 4

The third season of the American television musical drama series Nashville, created by Callie Khouri, began on September 24, 2014, on ABC. The show features an ensemble cast with Connie Britton and Hayden Panettiere in the leading roles as two country music superstars, Rayna Jaymes and Juliette Barnes.

The episodes are named after country songs from a variety of artists, like Webb Pierce ("That's Me Without You"), Willie Nelson (a number of songs, like "The Storm Has Just Begun") and Loretta Lynn ("You're Lookin' at Country").

== Production ==
On May 9, 2014, Nashville was renewed for a third season by ABC. The series was renewed after prolonged negotiations for a full 22-episode season. This season will receive a combined $8 million incentive package from the state of Tennessee, Metro Nashville and other local groups, lower than the Season 2 incentives — which totaled $13.25 million. On March 11, 2014, before the show was renewed, it was announced that Oliver Hudson and Will Chase are being promoted to regulars for season three, contingent on the ABC series getting a renewal. The series creator and executive producer later said that "a lot of our characters may not be in every episode this year".

On July 30, 2014, it was announced that Tony Award winner Laura Benanti was cast in the recurring role of country star Sadie Stone who is Rayna's friend. On August 1, 2014, it was announced that the first episode of the season will be aired live, and will consist of musical performances broadcast directly from the Bluebird Café. This will be the first time in TV history that a scripted drama has attempted this musical feat. On August 11, 2014, it was announced that actress-singer Brette Taylor joined the cast in a major recurring role as Pam, Luke's sultry, extroverted new backup singer, and Alexa PenaVega also was cast for a multi-episode arc as Kiley, Gunnar's first love and who is now a single mother. On August 14, 2014, it was announced that the Emmy Award Winning dancer Derek Hough, would also join the cast for a multi-episode arc as Noah West. On the same day, it was announced that Judith Hoag (Tandy Hampton) will be leaving the show after the second episode, but may return later. (She makes a guest appearance in "First To Have A Second Chance.") On September 12, 2014, it was announced that Mykelti Williamson was cast in a four-episode arc as musician who, after personal tragedy, lives as a nomad on the streets of Nashville. On October 27, 2014, it was announced that Moniqua Plante also was cast for a multiple-episode arc as Natasha, a woman, who "expected to provide some jaw-dropping twists for Teddy". Country singer Sara Evans joined the cast as a fictionalized version of herself. She had guest starring role in the episode dated October 29, 2014 and set to possible recurring return later with major story arc. On January 23, 2015, it was announced that Kyle Dean Massey joined the cast in a recurring role as openly gay country music singer-songwriter Kevin Bicks. Christina Aguilera later was cast as a pop superstar Jade St. John for a multi-episode arc.

Filming for season three ended on April 17, 2015.

== Cast ==
=== Regular ===
- Connie Britton as Rayna Jaymes
- Hayden Panettiere as Juliette Barnes
- Clare Bowen as Scarlett O'Connor
- Chris Carmack as Will Lexington
- Will Chase as Luke Wheeler
- Eric Close as Teddy Conrad
- Charles Esten as Deacon Clayborne
- Oliver Hudson as Jeff Fordham
- Jonathan Jackson as Avery Barkley
- Sam Palladio as Gunnar Scott
- Lennon Stella as Maddie Conrad
- Maisy Stella as Daphne Conrad

=== Recurring ===
- Aubrey Peeples as Layla Grant
- David Alford as Bucky Dawes
- Laura Benanti as Sadie Stone
- Kourtney Hansen as Emily
- Ed Amatrudo as Glenn Goodman
- Andi Rayne and Nora Gill as Cadence Barkley
- Nick Jandl as Dr. Caleb Rand
- Moniqua Plante as Natasha
- Chaley Rose as Zoey Dalton
- Gunnar Sizemore as Micah Brenner
- Keean Johnson as Colt Wheeler
- Alexa PenaVega as Kiley Brenner
- Brette Taylor as Pam York
- Kyle Dean Massey as Kevin Bicks
- Judith Hoag as Tandy Hampton
- Mykelti Williamson as Terry George
- Derek Hough as Noah West
- Christina Aguilera as Jade St. John
- Scott Reeves as Noel Laughlin
- Rex Linn as Bill Lexington

=== Guest ===
- Dana Wheeler-Nicholson as Beverly O'Connor
- Sylvia Jefferies as Jolene Barnes
- The Band Perry
- Luke Bryan as himself
- Sara Evans as a fictionalized version of herself
- Florida Georgia Line
- Joe Nichols as himself
- Brad Paisley as himself
- Amy Robach as herself
- Anthony Ruivivar as Rolling Stone reporter
- Carrie Underwood as herself
- Trisha Yearwood as herself
- Pam Tillis as herself
- Mario Lopez as himself
- Tracey Edmonds as herself
- Charissa Thompson as herself
- Terri Clark as herself
- Chuck Wicks as himself
- Blair Garner as himself
- Bobby Bones as himself
- Lorrie Morgan as herself

== Episodes ==
No. overall	No. in season	Title	Directed by	Written by	Original release date	US viewers (millions)
44	1	"That's Me Without You"	Callie Khouri	Dee Johnson	September 24, 2014	5.80
Rayna makes a decision on whom to marry; Luke or Deacon. While auditioning to play the role of Patsy Cline for a movie, Juliette lets her emotions of her break-up show through. As Scarlett prepares to leave for Mississippi, Avery stops by saying that he wants to go with her. Gunnar surprises them in the car, trying to convince Scarlett to stay but she rides off with him anyway. Juliette receives shocking news and Layla processes Will's confession about being gay.
45	2	"How Far Down Can I Go?"	Mario Van Peebles	Meredith Lavender & Marcie Ulin	October 1, 2014	5.34
After getting the news that her album has been bumped from the #1 spot on the charts, Rayna tries to figure out how to make sure that her album does well in today's music. Maddie is not happy that her mother is marrying Luke so she takes it out on Deacon by saying that he should have tried harder to get her. He tells her that he did by proposing to her but she said no. Jeff looks to sign a singer named Sadie Stone after being told by his boss that he needs a female on his roster. At the doctor Juliette is relieved when she figures out that Jeff can't be the father of her baby because she is too far along.
46	3	"I Can't Get Over You to Save My Life"	Stephen Cragg	David Gould	October 8, 2014	5.61
With Rayna and Luke both having busy schedules, they have to figure out when it's best to get married. Juliette struggles with morning sickness and has to keep excusing herself during tour rehearsals. Glenn and Emily are concerned so they go snooping around her home to find clues, thinking she is on drugs. She catches them in the act and tells them that she is not on drugs. Gunnar runs into his first love, a girl named, Kiley and Deacon finds comfort with Luke's backup singer, Pam. Layla goes to Jeff blackmailing him into making her next album go gold, if not she will out Will.
47	4	"I Feel Sorry for Me"	Elodie Keene	Debra Fordham	October 15, 2014	5.02
Juliette turns to Rayna and tells her, Glenn and Emily that she is pregnant. She wants to keep her pregnancy discreet and plans to give the baby up for adoption. Jeff wins a trip to go golfing with Teddy where he butters up to him, and asks about his girls. Zoey thinks there something going on between Gunnar and Scarlett after finding them in a storage room together. Scarlett tells her it's just a song and they were there to plan a surprise party for her. Glenn visits Avery and tells him to go see Juliette but he turns him down. After receiving offers from both Highway 65 and Edgehill, Sadie decides to sign with Rayna after being convinced that Jeff only wants her so he can show her off to his board nothing more. In retaliation Jeff calls someone about looking to sign two sisters then waves to Teddy. Avery continues to drink and avoids Juliette until she has to bail him out of jail.
48	5	"Road Happy"	Arlene Sanford	Dana Greenblatt	October 22, 2014	5.37
While getting ready to start community service Avery gets a text from Juliette saying that she is pregnant with his baby. Rayna, her girls, Luke and his son spend the day together while Rayna and Luke film a commercial in Iowa. Deacon doesn't like that Luke is spending the day off with Maddie and he's not. Gunnar discovers that Kiley has a 9 1/2-year-old son. Avery comes to Juliette's movie trailer, yelling that she is pregnant with his baby. Noah, Julliette's co-star overheard Avery and tells her that he will keep her secret safe. Will gets jumped by two guys in the park and gets called a homophobic slur, Layla tries to write her own songs that aren't mushy love songs, Scarlett befriends a homeless man and Juliette rushes off stage then passes out.
49	6	"Nobody Said It Was Going to Be Easy"	Thomas Carter	Taylor Hamra	October 29, 2014	5.59
The CMA nominations are announced with Rayna leading with the most nominations; she questions if it's because she is with Luke. Will's own nomination causes tension between him and Layla. After passing out, Juliette is rushed to the hospital to be checked out. Avery drives all night to Cincinnati to check on her only to be surprised when Noah walks in. Gunnar wants to spend time with Micah even though Kiley is hesitant. Juliette discovers that she has a condition that causes her to have blood clots; the doctor orders her to stop touring and she also talks with Avery regarding the baby. Maddie and Colt throw a party at Rayna's and Daphne has to call the police because Teddy won't answer his phone. Teddy is not happy when he finds out that the woman he was seeing was an escort hired by Jeff. Juliette finally tells the world that she is pregnant and that Avery is the father.
50	7	"I'm Coming Home to You"	Mike Listo	Monica Macer	November 12, 2014	5.66
Two months have passed and Rayna is busy between work and family time. Her Rolling Stone interview gets in the way of things leaving Luke frustrated since he hasn't seen her much in two months. Juliette and Avery argue over to find out the gender of the baby or not and other things. While Kiley is visiting her boyfriend, Micah stays with Gunnar and Zoey; he has found that Gunnar is his dad. Layla and Will are able to get along and attend the premiere of their reality show but things turn when she is portrayed as a ditz. The homeless man that Scarlett befriended, Terry returns. They write music together and he tells her about his past including how his family died years ago. Scarlett googles him and sees that he once had a hit song. Juliette feels that she is all alone but Emily informs that she isn't. During the home interview for Rolling Stone, Rayna, Luke and the reporter walk in on Maddie and Colt making out. In exchange for not writing about what the reporter saw Rayna is willing to tell her story about Deacon. Avery decides to be involved with pregnancy and for the first time feel the baby kick. Wondering where Kiley is, Gunnar calls her only to be told that she is leaving Micah with him so she can leave town to be with her boyfriend who doesn't want kids.
51	8	"You're Lookin' at Country"	Eric Close	Geoffrey Nauffts	November 19, 2014	5.52
It's finally the night of the CMA's with Rayna and Luke competing against each other for Entertainer of the Year. Before the show while looking for something in Luke's bag, Rayna comes across a prenup which surprises her. Gunnar and Zoey deal with being sudden parents to Micah. It's around the one year anniversary of Jolene's death and Juilette has flashbacks of her unhappy childhood. She also meets Avery's parents, whose father doesn't agree with him and Juilette being parents. Rayna wins big at the CMA's including Entertainer of the Year. Luke is upset with her since she thanked Deacon during one of her speeches and that she came with him not Deacon. He also tells her that the only reason why her album went gold is because he proposed to her the day it was released. At the show Micah runs off leaving Gunnar frantic and so he looks for him making him miss his winning/acceptance of an award. Later that night at home Luke apologizes for his jealous attitude, that he didn't mean what he said earlier and that his ego got the best of him.
52	9	"Two Sides to Every Story"	Stephen Cragg	Ben St. John & Mollie Bickley St. John	December 3, 2014	5.26
Rayna continues to pull out all stops in self-promotion, this time by agreeing to do a televised Christmas special from her home, for charity, with Luke and the children. When Rayna invites Deacon to join the filming, things get awkward fast – her magazine cover story has reverberations for her personal life. Meantime, it's Nashville's Winterfest, and Zoey, Gunnar and Avery have an opportunity to perform and get signed with a manager. But an argument erupts between Gunnar and Zoey over his refusal to go on tour now that he's a father and Zoey storms off. Scarlett gets Terry a gig headlining at the fest which goes well until he has a panic attack and flees the stage. When Scarlett finally tracks him down, she finds him drunk and he accuses her of being a coward by forcing him to do what she cannot. Facing her fears, she steps up and joins Avery and Gunnar on stage. Zoey leaves for LA. Will and Layla go to Winterfest incognito to escape their lives and find solace. Will chats with a gay beer vendor while Layla is able to play her own music and bonds with Jeff.
53	10	"First to Have a Second Chance"	Callie Khouri	Meredith Lavender & Marcie Ulin	December 10, 2014	5.65
When Luke finally returns home after wrapping up his tour just days before he and Rayna are to tie the knot, Rayna starts to feel conflicted about leaving their kids to go out on the road again, especially after she discovers that Luke has been making parenting decisions without her. She also starts to think about her future. Meanwhile, Will invites Layla on tour in an effort to keep her close but when he sees her flirting with Jeff at a party, he begins to feel like he's losing control of their situation and forces Jeff to cut off their budding romance. At the party a woman hits on him, when he declines she says that the gay rumors about him must be true, so he sleeps with her to convince her otherwise. Unbeknownst to him, a drunk and heartbroken Layla sees this and overdoses on pills given to her by Jeff. Jeff and Will find her later floating in the pool. Juliette invites Avery to move in with her temporarily after the baby is born but he decides to propose to her instead and they elope. Deacon receives bad news about his health; Gunnar finds out that Micah is really his brother Jason's son, therefore is actually his nephew, much to his disappointment and seeks comfort from Scarlett. Sadie gets a visit from her violent abusive ex, and Rayna decides not to go through with her marriage.
54	11	"I'm Not That Good at Goodbye"	Jan Eliasberg	Debra Fordham	February 4, 2015	5.05
Rayna deals with the aftermath of calling off her wedding, and a furious Luke shows up at Deacon's thinking that Rayna is there. Deacon tells him that he hasn't seen her in two weeks, that it has nothing to do with him. Luke disagrees, stating when it comes to Rayna it's always about him, calling her a bitch as he leaves. Deacon defends her by pouncing on him and punching him. Bucky tells her that Luke and his team are not going to make things easy such as having her pay the huge wedding bill, now no longer paid by the 'Hello' magazine deal. The girls are not happy because Maddie doesn't like how she didn't call it off to be with Deacon, and Daphne wanted Sage to be her new sister. Layla is at the hospital after being found face down in Jeff's pool with a pill overdose. After talking with Will, at his behest Jeff is able to pull the plug on Layla and Will's reality show, plus reclaim Will's incriminating 'outing' footage off them. Avery moves in with Juliette, where they try to compromise on moving his stuff in. Luke throws a party as his answer to Rayna talking to the press; Deacon gets a diagnosis with rather alarming news; and Sadie figures how to deal with her abusive ex. Even though Gunnar is not Micah's father, he still goes to court to fight to have full custody of him and is eventually forced to tell Micah the truth. Micah doesn't take the news well, he disappointingly accuses Gunnar of lying to him. Rayna visits Deacon telling him that she loves him, always has but needs some time to herself to sort things out before moving forward together.
55	12	"I've Got Reasons to Hate You"	Jean de Segonzac	Sibyl Gardner	February 11, 2015	5.18
Rumors are flying about Rayna's whereabouts since she hasn't been seen out in public for weeks, so she decides to sing at the Bluebird as a way to shut them up. Jeff wants a Taylor Swift like singer on his label for the younger demographic and has his sights set out on Maddie. Juliette works on her new album; Gunnar works on having a relationship with Micach and tells him about Jason. Scarlett calls her mom to come up from Mississippi so she can tell her about Deacon and possibly be a liver donor for him. With his job on the line, Jeff goes to Teddy saying that he has to sign off with Maddie signing with Edgehill because if he doesn't, Jeff will let it known that Teddy used tax payer money for sex.
56	13	"I'm Lost Between Right and Wrong"	Michael Lohmann	David Gould	February 18, 2015	4.72
After Teddy has agreed to sign Maddie to Edgehill, Rayna will not stop trying to dissolve her contract. Meanwhile, Avery is busy producing Sadie's album, but she is having a hard time doing this, due to her ex-husband stalking her. Also, Deacon finds out that he will only have six months to live if he does not find an organ donor. After Rayna reveals Jeff's indiscretions, Edgehill begins to fall apart, and Jeff is fired. Rayna then meets with Teddy, and tells him that she does not think it is in Maddie and Daphne's best interest for them to see Teddy anymore. Luke, Gunnar and Will have a boys night out.
57	14	"Somebody Pick Up My Pieces"	Stephen Cragg	Dana Greenblatt	February 25, 2015	4.86
Jeff's career takes a tumble thanks to Rayna. Meanwhile, Sadie confides in Rayna about her ex-husband; Deacon contemplates participating in a clinical trial for an alternative treatment; and Scarlett and Gunnar bond as they both focus on writing. Looking for a new job, Jeff gives Luke the idea about starting his own label with Jeff running it but no one besides Will wants to sign because of Jeff so he is fired. Rayna butt heads with newly appointed A&R Bucky about signing Layla; Teddy gets worried about his job
58	15	"That's the Way Love Goes"	Callie Khouri	Callie Khouri	March 4, 2015	5.31
The Grand Ole Opry honors Rayna on a special anniversary, so she asks Deacon and her daughters to sing with her. Meanwhile, Will's distressed to be collaborating with a gay man on a songwriting project; and Sadie shares her private ordeal on national TV. Gunnar, Scarlett, and Avery have the opportunity to open up for Rascal Flatts and come up with a new band name, "The Triple Exes". Scarlett lays in to Deacon on how she hates being the only one who knows that he has cancer so he finally tells Rayna.
59	16	"I Can't Keep Away From You"	Mike Listo	Taylor Hamra	April 1, 2015	5.05
Rayna refuses to let Deacon wallow in his condition, but her support only frustrates him and pushes him away. Meanwhile, Avery, Gunnar and Scarlett are opening for Rascal Flatts on tour, but, when her past public meltdown haunts her on social media, Scarlett becomes wary of performing again. Meanwhile, Jeff and Layla continue to blur the lines of business and pleasure, sending Layla into a state of confusion. Will is enjoying his new writing partner Kevin, but hits a bump in the road when Kevin is mysteriously no longer available. Then, Sadie finds herself in a dangerous situation with her relentless ex-husband. When Sadie's ex-husband comes to beat Sadie up for her comment on T.V, she pulls her gun out, and after fumbling and fighting over the gun, Sadie accidentally shoots, and kills him, with Luke finding them after.
60	17	"This Just Ain't a Good Day for Leavin'"	Michael Lohmann	Paul Keables	April 8, 2015	4.61
Juliette is excited about Rayna throwing her a star-studded baby shower, but when Rayna gets pulled into Sadie's drama instead of hosting, Juliette starts her own mama drama. Bucky and Luke Wheeler both are interested in signing rising singer/songwriter Ron Pope (who guest stars as himself). Gunnar is upset by Scarlett growing closer to Dr. Rand, and Sadie finds a kindred spirit in an old friend. Luke says that he witnessed the whole ordeal with Sadie, and she is free to go. She then leaves town to go back home. Juliette has her baby.
61	18	"Nobody Knows But Me"	Callie Khouri	David Gould & Monica Macer	April 15, 2015	4.62
With the arrival of his former fiancee in Nashville, Jeff finds himself face-to-face with Jade St. John (played by Christina Aguilera), a powerhouse pop-star in Nashville on tour. Jeff is forced to revisit his past and work with the woman who once played a large role in both his personal and professional lives. Meanwhile, Deacon continues to cope with his cancer diagnosis - a secret that weighs heavily on his family -- especially Maddie, who struggles with the news herself, and is now dating Colt (Luke's son). While Juliette is eager to get back to work following the birth of her daughter, she quickly finds balancing motherhood and a music career challenging, so she hires a nanny, and then takes off to leave to record a song for her movie, while Avery struggles with his own responsibilities and his Triple Exes band mates. Avery has to quit the band, and it is revealed Natasha was working with the FBI.
62	19	"The Storm Has Just Begun"	Nelson McCormick	Dana Greenblatt & Geoffrey Nauffts	April 22, 2015	5.32
The brightest stars of Nashville have gathered in support of Teddy's music education initiative, "Note By Note," where Juliette plans her return to the spotlight – and Layla finds herself thrust into it – alongside Jade St. John. At the gala, Rayna, Deacon, Maddie and Daphne get ready to take the stage and perform, but before they can, Deacon receives the call he's been waiting for containing some life-changing news.
63	20	"Time Changes Things"	Arlene Sanford	Debra Fordham	April 29, 2015	4.70
Rayna travels to Mississippi to try to convince Deacon's sister Beverly to be his liver donor before it's too late. She denies her because she blames Rayna for being the reason why she never became a singer. Deacon decided to join Rayna's band instead of singing with Beverly. Jade throws a party at her house in Malibu and invites Luke, Jeff and Layla. Kiley shows up at Gunnar's and explains to him how she got pregnant with Micah, Jason raped her at a party while she was sleeping. Meanwhile Juliette attempts to jump-start her career by having a surprise rooftop concert as a way to say she's back. Teddy is warned by Natasha to look out for the authorities.
64	21	"Is the Better Part Over?"	Julie Hébert	Meredith Lavender & Marcie Ulin	May 6, 2015	4.99
The Exes get an offer to sign with Highway 65 and after debating about it they sign. The public becomes aware of Deacon's cancer and everyone starts talking about it. Using Layla's Twitter account, Jeff tweeted a picture of Layla at Jade's party so she gets kicked off her tour as opening act. Juliette is determined to stay in the public eye and promises to make an album in two days. She neglects her baby by focusing on her music instead. Emily gets concerned about her and informs Avery. Her doctor thinks that she is suffering from postpartum depression but she denies that she has it. Will gets a surprise visit from his father while Deacon gets a surprise of his own. The tabloids have obtain pictures of Will and Kevin spending time together. Luke sees them before the story breaks and finds out Will's secret.
65	22	"Before You Go Make Sure You Know"	Callie Khouri	Dee Johnson & Callie Khouri	May 13, 2015	4.65
In the season three finale, Juliette is so focused on her album she puts everything she loves behind her. Deacon prepares for surgery. Teddy is arrested for failing to turn in Tandy Hampton. Scarlett and Gunnar grow closer to each other. Juliette fires Glenn, and signs with Luke despite still being signed on Highway 65, and partners with Jeff. Originally going to deny that he is gay when the story breaks on him so he can protect his career, Will decides to come out publicly during the press conference that he is holding. Not happy with Juliette, Avery takes Cadence and hits the road. As Deacon and Beverly are in surgery a flat line is shown on the heart monitor, and Dr. Rand tells Rayna that he has bad news, leaving the season on a cliffhanger on whether or not Deacon or Beverly died.

== U.S. ratings ==
No.	Title	Air date	Rating/Share (18–49)	Viewers (million)	DVR 18-49	DVR viewers (million)	Total 18-49	Total viewers (million)
1	"That's Me Without You"	September 24, 2014	1.5/5	5.80	0.9	2.32	2.4	8.12
2	"How Far Down Can I Go"	October 2, 2014	1.6/5	5.34	0.9	—N/a	2.4	—N/a
3	"I Can't Get Over You to Save My Life"	October 9, 2014	1.5/5	5.61	1.0	—N/a	2.4	—N/a
4	"I Feel Sorry For Me"	October 15, 2014	1.3/4	5.02	0.9	—N/a	2.2	—N/a
5	"Road Happy"	October 22, 2014	1.4/4	5.37	1.0	—N/a	2.4	—N/a
6	"Nobody Said it was Going to be Easy"	October 29, 2014	1.4/4	5.59	1.0	—N/a	2.4	—N/a
7	"I'm Coming Home to You"	November 12, 2014	1.4/5	5.66	1.1	—N/a	2.5	—N/a
8	"You're Lookin' at Country"	November 19, 2014	1.5/5	5.52	1.0	—N/a	2.5	—N/a
9	"Two Sides to Every Story"	December 3, 2014	1.3/4	5.26	0.9	2.37	2.2	7.63
10	"First to Have a Second Chance"	December 10, 2014	1.5/5	5.65	1.0	2.66	2.5	8.31
11	"I'm Not That Good at Goodbye"	February 4, 2015	1.3/4	5.05	0.9	2.54	2.2	7.59
12	"I've Got Reasons To Hate You"	February 11, 2015	1.4/4	5.18	0.9	—N/a	2.3	—N/a
13	"I'm Lost Between Right or Wrong"	February 18, 2015	1.3/4	4.72	1.0	2.6	2.3	7.32
14	"Somebody Pick Up My Pieces"	February 25, 2015	1.3/4	4.86	1.0	2.17	2.3	7.03
15	"That's The Way Love Goes"	March 4, 2015	1.4/5	5.31	1.1	2.63	2.5	7.94
16	"I Can't Keep Away From You"	April 1, 2015	1.3/4	5.05	0.9	2.59	2.2	7.64
17	"This Just Ain't a Good Day for Leavin'"	April 8, 2015	1.1/4	4.61	0.9	2.44	2.2	7.05
18	"Nobody Knows But Me"	April 15, 2015	1.2/4	4.62	0.9	2.67	2.1	7.29
19	"The Storm Has Just Begun"	April 22, 2015	1.3/4	5.32	0.9	2.33	2.2	7.65
20	"Time Changes Things"	April 29, 2015	1.3/4	4.70	0.8	2.37	2.1	7.07
21	"Is the Better Part Over"	May 6, 2015	1.3/4	4.99	0.8	2.33	2.1	7.32
22	"Before You Go Make Sure You Know"	May 13, 2015	1.2/4	4.65	0.9	2.58	2.1	7.23
