= Nashville (TV series) =

American musical drama

- Genre: Musical; Soap opera
- Created by: Callie Khouri
- Showrunners: Dee Johnson (seasons 1–4); Marshall Herskovitz (seasons 5–6); Ed Zwick (seasons 5–6)
- Starring: Connie Britton; Hayden Panettiere; Clare Bowen; Eric Close; Charles Esten; Jonathan Jackson; Sam Palladio; Robert Wisdom; Powers Boothe; Chris Carmack; Lennon Stella; Maisy Stella; Will Chase; Oliver Hudson; Aubrey Peeples; Cameron Scoggins; Kaitlin Doubleday; Jeff Nordling
- Country of origin: United States
- Original language: English
- No. of seasons: 6
- No. of episodes: 124 (list of episodes)

Production
- Executive producers: Callie Khouri; Steve Buchanan; Loucas George (season 1); James Parriott (season 1); R. J. Cutler (season 1); Dee Johnson (seasons 1–4); Connie Britton (seasons 1–5); Ed Zwick (seasons 5–6); Marshall Herskovitz (seasons 5–6); Jayson Dinsmore (seasons 5–6); Morgan Selzer (seasons 5–6); Brian Phillips (seasons 5–6); Liberty Godshall (seasons 5–6)
- Producers: Meredith Lavender (seasons 1–4); Marcie Ulin (seasons 1–4); Bill Hill (season 1); Liz Tigelaar (season 1); Chad Savage (season 1); Michael Attanasio (seasons 2–4); Debra Fordham (seasons 2–4); David Gould (seasons 2–4); Dana Greenblatt (seasons 2–4); Geoffrey Nauffts (seasons 3–6); Taylor Hamra (seasons 3–4); Randy S. Nelson (season 4); Matthew M. Ross (seasons 5–6); Jesse Zwick (seasons 5–6); Richard Kramer (seasons 5–6); Tommy Burns (seasons 5–6); Scott Saccoccio (seasons 5–6); Antonio Tovar Jr. (seasons 5–6); Savannah Dooley (seasons 5–6)
- Camera setup: Single-camera
- Running time: 42–44 minutes
- Production companies: ABC Studios (seasons 1–5); Lionsgate Television; Opry Entertainment; Cutler Productions (season 1); Walk & Chew Gum, Inc.; Small Wishes Productions (seasons 1–4); The Bedford Falls Company (seasons 5–6)
- Budget: $39.7 million (s.1); $90.2 million (s.2); $91.7 million (s.3); $85.6 million (s.4); $86.6 million (s.5); $62.4 million (s.6)

Original release
- Network: ABC
- Release: October 10, 2012 – May 25, 2016
- Network: CMT
- Release: December 15, 2016 – July 26, 2018

Nashville is an American musical drama television series created by Callie Khouri, who also served as an executive producer of the series along with Steve Buchanan. Other executive producers included Dee Johnson through season four, Connie Britton through season five, and Marshall Herskovitz and Ed Zwick from season five onward.

The series chronicles the lives of various fictitious country music singers in Nashville, Tennessee, starring Connie Britton as Rayna Jaymes, a country music superstar whose stardom is beginning to fade, and Hayden Panettiere as rising younger star Juliette Barnes.

Nashville debuted on ABC on October 10, 2012, and aired on the network until May 25, 2016. In June 2016, ABC canceled the series after four seasons. Later that month, it was renewed by CMT and began airing on the channel on December 15, 2016. The fifth season (with new producers, writers and showrunners) debuted on January 5, 2017. The sixth and final season debuted on January 4, 2018, and the series ended on July 26, 2018. The series received positive reviews from critics. 124 episodes were produced.

== Plot ==
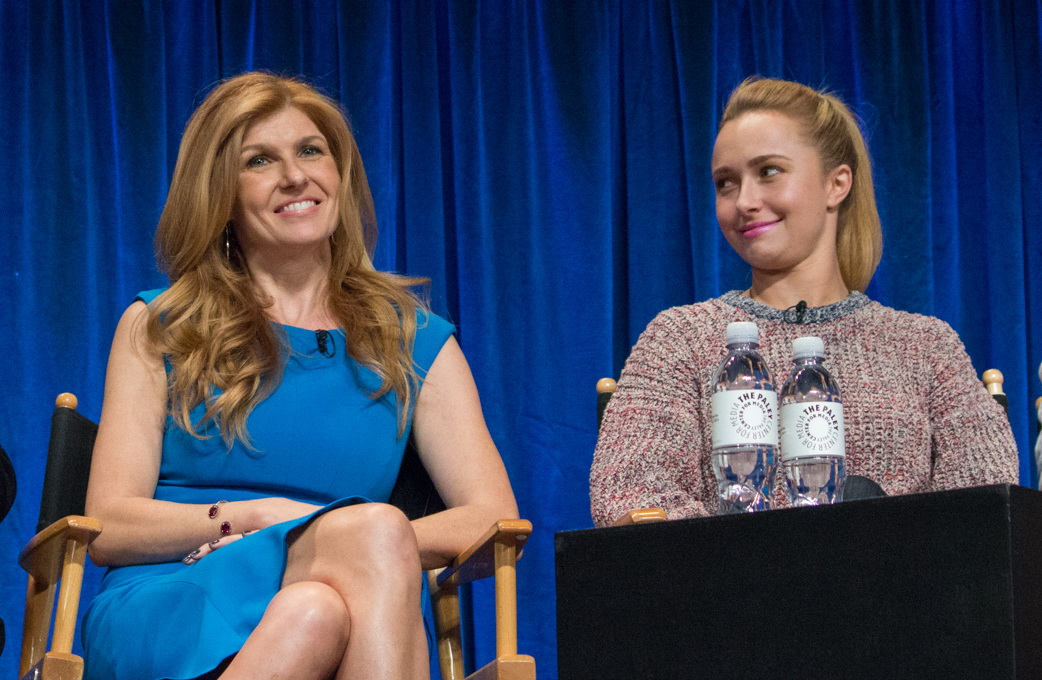
Connie Britton and Hayden Panettiere at the PaleyFest 2013 panel for the show

In the first episode, the series focuses on the rivalry of Rayna Jaymes and Juliette Barnes. Rayna Jaymes is the established "Queen of Country Music". However, her latest album is not selling well and her tour is playing to half empty venues. Her record label suggests that she open for Juliette Barnes, the young and beautiful best-selling singer of bubble gum country pop. Juliette sees Rayna as privileged and purposefully alienates her. Rayna, who dislikes Juliette's style of music, rejects a joint tour out of hand. The two women come into conflict as each tries to get guitarist Deacon Claybourne, Rayna's bandmate and former lover, to sign on to their tour. Rayna's life is further complicated when her estranged father, millionaire businessman Lamar Wyatt, convinces her husband, Teddy Conrad, to run for Mayor of Nashville.

For later episodes through season four, the series follows the lives of country musicians, focusing on three female leads: country superstar Rayna Jaymes, rising problematic star Juliette Barnes, and newcomer singer-songwriter Scarlett O'Connor.

From mid-season five, the series follows the lives of country musicians, focusing on two female leads: rising star Maddie Conrad, Rayna Jaymes' daughter, and fading star Juliette Barnes, as well as focusing on recurring characters.

The premise beginning with season six followed country stars Juliette Barnes, Deacon Claybourne, and the Highway 65 record label family as they strive to keep Rayna Jaymes' dream alive and pursue their music while juggling relationships, family, and the ever-changing industry.

== Cast and characters ==
=== Main ===
- Connie Britton as Rayna Jaymes (seasons 1–5; guest season 6): a 40-year-old country music superstar singer whose stardom is beginning to fade
- Hayden Panettiere as Juliette Barnes: a bubblegum country pop singer and former teen star sensation who is determined to replace Rayna as the top superstar of country music
- Clare Bowen as Scarlett O'Connor: a poet and songwriter, Deacon's niece, and musician partner with Gunnar who works at the Bluebird Cafe, which is where she performs and is first noticed
- Eric Close as Teddy Conrad (seasons 1–3; guest seasons 4–6): Rayna's husband who, after a business failure, is now living on his wife's income. He runs for mayor with help from his father-in-law and wins the election, later divorcing Rayna.
- Charles Esten as Deacon Claybourne: songwriter, lead guitar player, Rayna's former lover and the biological father of her older child, Maddie
- Jonathan Jackson as Avery Barkley: an aspiring musician with a bad-boy streak. He and Scarlett are in a relationship when the series begins, but soon separate and he then has an on-again, off-again relationship with Juliette and they have a daughter, and later an unknown child at the end of the series.
- Sam Palladio as Gunnar Scott: a kind-hearted aspiring musician who dates Scarlett in season one, and dates Zoey in the second season
- Robert Wisdom as Coleman Carlisle (season 1; guest season 2): a one-time mayoral candidate, and later Nashville's deputy mayor, Coleman is a close friend of Rayna and serves as Deacon's sobriety sponsor
- Powers Boothe as Lamar Wyatt (season 1; recurring season 2): Rayna's father and a wealthy, powerful and controlling patriarch and local politician who disapproves of his daughter's career as a country singer
- Chris Carmack as Will Lexington (seasons 2–6; recurring season 1): a rising country star struggling with the realization that he might be gay
- Lennon Stella as Maddie Conrad (seasons 2–6; recurring season 1): Rayna and Teddy's older daughter, who is later revealed as Deacon's biological daughter
- Maisy Stella as Daphne Conrad (seasons 2–6; recurring season 1): Rayna and Teddy's younger daughter
- Will Chase as Luke Wheeler (seasons 3–4; recurring season 2; guest season 5): the biggest male country artist and a love interest for Rayna
- Oliver Hudson as Jeff Fordham (season 3; recurring seasons 2 & 4): a record company executive who clashes with Rayna and Juliette
- Aubrey Peeples as Layla Grant (season 4; recurring season 2–3): introduced in the second season as a reality competition second-place winner who clashes with everyone
- Cameron Scoggins as Zach Welles (season 5; recurring season 6): a wealthy tech-billionaire
- Kaitlin Doubleday as Jessie Caine (season 6; recurring season 5): Brad Maitland's ex-wife who catches Deacon's eye.
- Jeff Nordling as Brad Maitland (season 6; recurring season 5): the owner of a big label in Nashville.

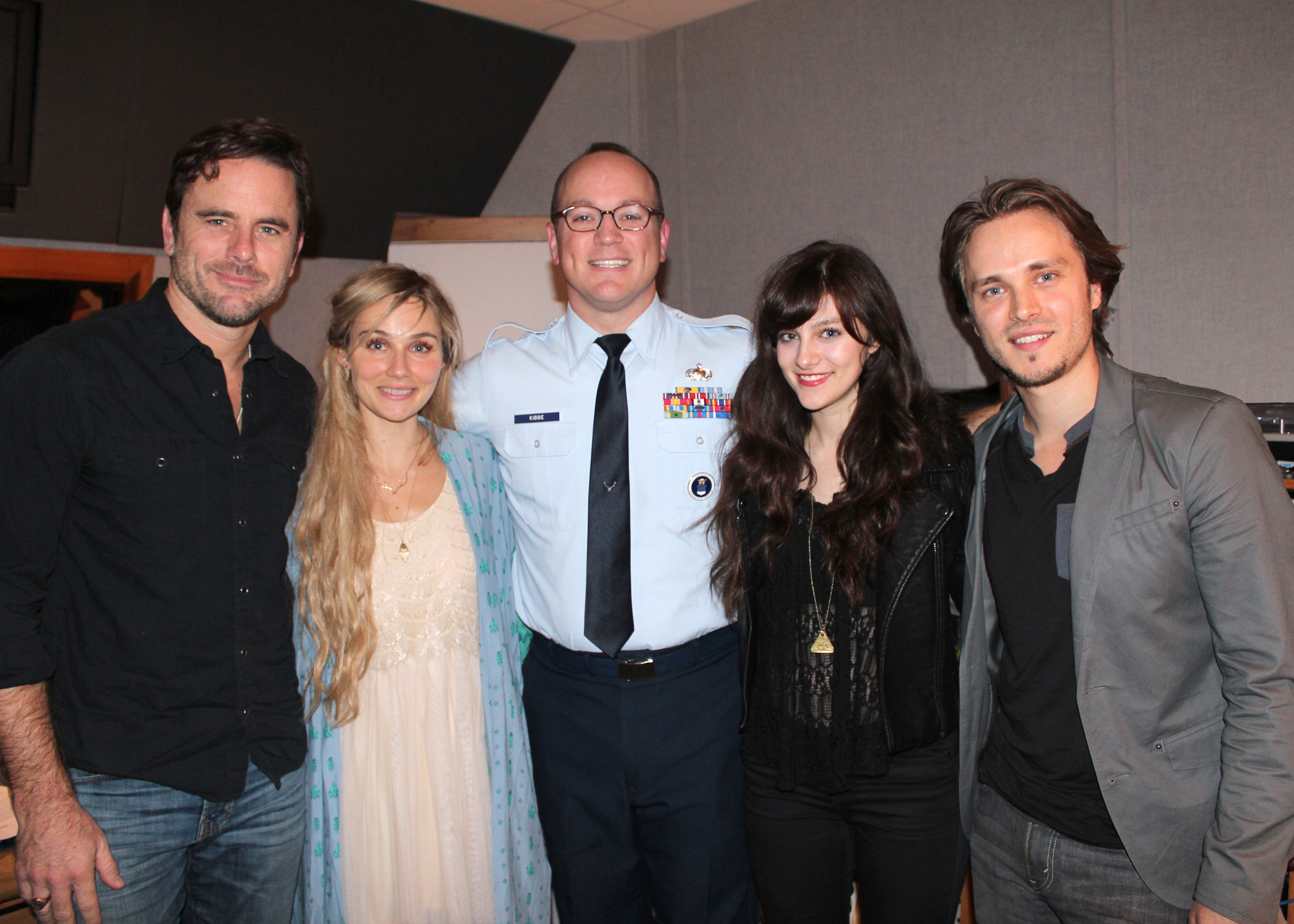
Master Sgt. Harry Kibbe flanked by Nashville cast members – from left, Charles Esten, Clare Bowen, Aubrey Peeples and Jonathan Jackson – in 2014

The show features an ensemble cast. For the first season, nine actors received star billing: Connie Britton as Rayna Jaymes, a 40-year-old country music superstar singer whose stardom is beginning to fade; Hayden Panettiere as Juliette Barnes, a bubblegum country pop singer and former teen star sensation who is determined to replace Rayna as the top superstar of country music; Clare Bowen as Scarlett O'Connor, a poet and songwriter Deacon's niece, and musician partner with Gunnar who works at the Bluebird Cafe which is where she is first noticed and performs; Eric Close as Theodore "Teddy" Conrad, Rayna's husband who, after a business failure, is now living on his wife's income. He runs for mayor with help from his father-in-law and wins election, later divorcing Rayna; Charles Esten as Deacon Claybourne, songwriter, lead guitar player, Rayna's former lover and biological father of her oldest child.; Jonathan Jackson as Avery Barkley, an aspiring musician with a bad-boy streak. He and Scarlett are in a relationship when the series begins, but soon separate; Sam Palladio as Gunnar Scott, a kind-hearted aspiring musician who dates Scarlett in season one, and dates Zoey in season two; Robert Wisdom as Coleman Carlisle, a one-time mayoral candidate, and later Deputy Mayor, close friend of Rayna, and serves as Deacon's sobriety sponsor; and Powers Boothe as Lamar Wyatt, Rayna's father and a wealthy, powerful and controlling patriarch and local politician who disapproves of his daughter's career as a country singer.

Powers Boothe and Robert Wisdom were reduced to recurring status, in the second season for creative reasons. After recurring in the first season, three actors were promoted to the regular cast in the second season: Chris Carmack as Will Lexington, a rising country star struggling with the realization that he might be gay, as well as Scarlett and Gunnar's new neighbor; Lennon Stella as Maddie Conrad, Rayna's older daughter, legal daughter to Teddy, and biological daughter to Deacon; and Maisy Stella as Daphne Conrad, Rayna and Teddy's younger daughter. For the third season, two actors were upped to regulars: Will Chase as Luke Wheeler, the biggest male country artist and a love interest for Rayna; and Oliver Hudson as Jeff Fordham, a record company executive who clashes with Rayna and Juliette. For season four, Hudson was downgraded to recurring status and then his character was killed off while Aubrey Peeples, introduced in season two as reality competition second-place winner (and later Will's wife) Layla Grant, was promoted to regular.

Aubrey Peeples and Will Chase were dropped from the cast after season four by the series' new showrunners. However, Chase made a guest appearance. Connie Britton left the show in season five. Rachel Bilson was announced to have joined the cast on March 9, 2017, as a series regular. Bilson plays Alyssa Greene, a Silicon Valley marketing expert brought in to take Highway 65 to the next level, who hates country music. Adding another series regular, it was announced that, after appearing in almost every episode in the first half of season five, Cameron Scoggins, who plays Zach Welles, a wealthy tech-billionaire would be upgraded to series regular. Scoggins left the main cast after the fifth season but did recur. Kaitlin Doubleday, who portrays Jessie Caine—a musician who returns to town to focus on her career and take back the son who was taken from her—was upped from recurring to series regular near the end of season five, and she returned as a regular for the sixth season. Another season five recurring player, Jeff Nordling, was also upped to series regular for season six. Nordling plays Brad Maitland, the charming and narcissistic owner of the most successful record label in Nashville, and Jessie's ex-husband who is up to no good.

The series' main cast for the sixth season

=== Recurring ===
In addition to the main cast, several actors appeared in Nashville in supporting roles. The most notable are Judith Hoag as Tandy Hampton, Rayna's sister, the daughter and protégée of Lamar Wyatt, who plays referee to Rayna and Lamar; Sylvia Jefferies as Jolene Barnes (season 1, 3, and 5–6), Juliette's overprotective and overbearing mother, a drug addict who later commits a murder-suicide; Susan Misner as Stacy (season 1), a veterinarian and Deacon's girlfriend; David Clayton Rogers as Gunnar's brother Jason; Keean Johnson as Colt Wheeler (seasons 2–4), Luke's son and a love interest for Maddie; Chaley Rose as Zoey Dalton (seasons 2, 3, and 4), Scarlett's childhood best friend who moves to Nashville, and starts dating Gunnar; Aubrey Peeples as Layla Grant (seasons 2–4), a runner-up in a singing competition and a new singer in Nashville who is a new rival for Juliette. She gets dropped from the label, after her single tanks, though she strikes up a romance with Will, and they eventually get engaged. She is a participant in a reality show featuring her and Will, and their impending nuptials; Laura Benanti as Sadie Stone (season 3), a country star who is a friend of Rayna's; Brette Taylor as Pam (season 3), as Luke's new backup singer; Derek Hough as Noah West (seasons 3 & 4), an actor who lands a role about a famous country singer; Kimberly Williams-Paisley as Margaret "Peggy" Kenter (seasons 1 & 2), Teddy's former co-worker at the credit union who helped him hide his embezzlement. They begin dating after Teddy and Rayna separate and marry after she lies to Teddy that she is pregnant. She is shot and killed while someone was attempting to kill Teddy; Michiel Huisman as Liam McGuinnis (seasons 1 & 2), Rayna's new music producer, who also has a brief fling with Rayna and Scarlett; Jay Hernandez as Dante Rivas (season 1), Jolene's sober companion and Juliette's lover, who, after attempting to blackmail Juliette, is killed by Jolene in a murder-suicide; Charlie Bewley as Charles Wentworth (season 2), a married confident business man, who owns many radio stations across the country, and has an affair with Juliette; Alexa PenaVega as Kiley (season 3), Gunnar's first love who is now a struggling single mother; Dana Wheeler-Nicholson as Beverly O'Connor (seasons 2–4), Scarlett's abusive mother who has a strained relationship with her brother, Deacon; Christina Chang as Megan Vannoy (season 2), Deacon's lawyer at the beginning of season two; Deacon and Megan were in a romantic relationship in season two until Deacon found out that she cheated on him with Teddy; Nick Jandl as Caleb Rand (seasons 3 & 4) as Deacon's doctor and a love interest of Scarlett's; Andi Rayne and Nora Gill as baby Cadence Barkley (seasons 3–6), Juliette and Avery's daughter.

Also appearing in many episodes are several background characters, including Ed Amatrudo as Glenn Goodman, Juliette Barnes's protective manager and father-figure, often tasked with cleaning up the messes that Juliette leaves behind; David Alford as Bucky Dawes, Rayna's long-time seasoned and caring manager; Todd Truly as Marshall Evans (season 1; 11 episodes), former president and CEO of Edgehill Republic Records. In the beginning of season two he gets fired by the board of Edgehill Records and is replaced by Jeff Fordham; Kourtney Hansen as Emily, Juliette's assistant; Melvin Ray Kearney II as Bo, Juliette Barnes's bodyguard and one of the limited few who she trusts. J. Karen Thomas as Audrey Carlisle (season 1), Coleman's wife; and Derek Krantz as Brent McKinney (season 2), an openly gay marketing and public relations employee who works for Jeff's record company who once dated Will; Kyle Dean Massey as Kevin Bicks (season 3–5), an openly gay country music singer-songwriter and later Will's major boyfriend.

For the fifth season, folk-Americana singer Rhiannon Giddens and indie-pop singer Bridgit Mendler joined the cast as Hallie Jordan and Ashley Wilkenson. Giddens held a major recurring role and appeared in the sixth season as well. She played Hallie Jordan, a religious church-goer who saves Juliette's life and later helps her find her religion. Later on, Juliette gets her signed to Highway 65. Mendler played a bratty pop star who Maddie clashed with in one episode. Joseph David-Jones as Clay, Maddie's boyfriend and musician, Christian Coulson as a music video director, and the father of Scarlett's baby, all joined the cast in major recurring roles. Cameron Scoggins, a wealthy tech-entrepreneur who helps Rayna out with struggling Highway 65, was originally cast in a recurring role, but was upgraded to a series regular and made guest appearances in season six. He left Nashville to run for office, but came back to help take down Brad. He and Will dated and it was later shown that they end up together. Other recurring roles include Linds Edwards as Carl Hockeny, Rayna's stalker, Ben Taylor as Flynn Burnett, a love interest for Daphne, and Katrina Norman joined the second half of the season as Polly, a stunning road manager of Avery's tour..

Five major recurring characters were announced for season six; part one, in addition to the returning recurring characters from the series' fifth season. Josh Stamberg played Darius, an extremely charismatic founder of a self-actualization movement that has transformed many lives that Juliette joins upon suffering from depression. Jake Etheridge played Sean, a recent military veteran suffering from severe PTSD who has yet to embrace his talent and passion for music. Rainee Blake played Alannah, who is a newcomer to the Nashville music scene, and a beautiful singer-songwriter who starts out as a backup singer but will soon be discovered for the star that she actually is meant to be when she joins the boys' band. Nic Luken played Jonah Ford, a famous male pop star who is very handsome, extremely confident, and charming and who catches Maddie's attention. Finally, Dylan Arnold played Twig, a childhood friend to Jonah. He navigates this lifestyle by guarding his anxiety and pain with a caustic, brilliant sense of humor. In addition, it was revealed that Dutch singer Ilse DeLange would have a recurring role as Ilse de Witt, a female coach on the talent show, Nashville Next. For the second half of the season, Mia Maestro and Ronny Cox joined the cast as Rosa and Gideon, respectively. Maestro played Rosa, a dedicated follower of Darius' cult who now is having doubts about her role in it. Cox played Gideon, a crusty, frustrated, would-be musician and recently reformed lifelong alcoholic who resented his son Deacon's success.

== Episodes ==
Season	Episodes		Originally released		
Season	Episodes		First released	Last released	Network
1	21		October 10, 2012	May 22, 2013	ABC
2	22		September 25, 2013	May 14, 2014	ABC
3	22		September 24, 2014	May 13, 2015	ABC
4	21		September 23, 2015	May 25, 2016	ABC
5	22	11	December 15, 2016	March 9, 2017	CMT
5	22	11	June 1, 2017	August 10, 2017	CMT
6	16	8	December 19, 2017	February 22, 2018	CMT
6	16	8	June 7, 2018	July 26, 2018	CMT

== Production ==
=== Development and filming ===
The series was created by Callie Khouri, who won an Academy Award for Thelma & Louise. Khouri lived in Nashville from 1978 to 1982. In an interview for The New York Times she said "This is a place that can be mocked and made fun of, and sometimes it deserves it, like any place. But it also is an incredibly beautiful, cosmopolitan city, and I wanted to show that to the world. I want to represent it in a way that everybody who lives here would find completely realistic." Nashville was the first television series in Khouri's career, after working for two decades as a film writer and director creating strong female characters.

The production began in 2011. In October 2011, ABC bought the original concept from Khouri. Documentary filmmaker R. J. Cutler also joined the project as executive producer alongside Khouri. Nashville was produced by Lionsgate Television with ABC Studios. ABC ordered the pilot on January 27, 2012. The pilot episode was filmed in March 2012 and directed by series producer R. J. Cutler. The series was picked up by ABC on May 11, 2012, and premiered on the network on October 10, 2012, as part of its 2012–13 television season. Dee Johnson joined the series as executive producer and showrunner as of the fourth episode, replacing Jim Parriott. On November 12, 2012, the series was picked up for a full season run, which was shortened by one episode by the producers (due to production difficulties) rather than the network.

A number of television critics characterized Nashville as "Dallas in Tennessee." The original concept was focused on the backdrop of the real country music world. ABC's promotional campaign for the series premiere was primarily focused on the rivalry between a young and ruthless country pop diva (Panettiere) and a past-her-peak superstar (Britton). Nashville was filmed on location and on soundstages in Nashville. The Bluebird Cafe, an important local performance arena, is a frequent setting; the show's art department, headed by production designer Jeff Knipp, precisely replicated its exterior and interior in a Nashville sound stage. After weeks of rumors that production would move elsewhere, it was announced that season two would also be filmed on location in Nashville. Nashville budget hovered in the neighborhood of $4 million per episode in season one. The budget for each season of the series was roughly $39.7 million, $90.2 million, $91.7 million, $85.6 million, $86.6 million, and $62.4 million respectively, with the series' budget as a whole totaling $456 million.

=== Casting ===
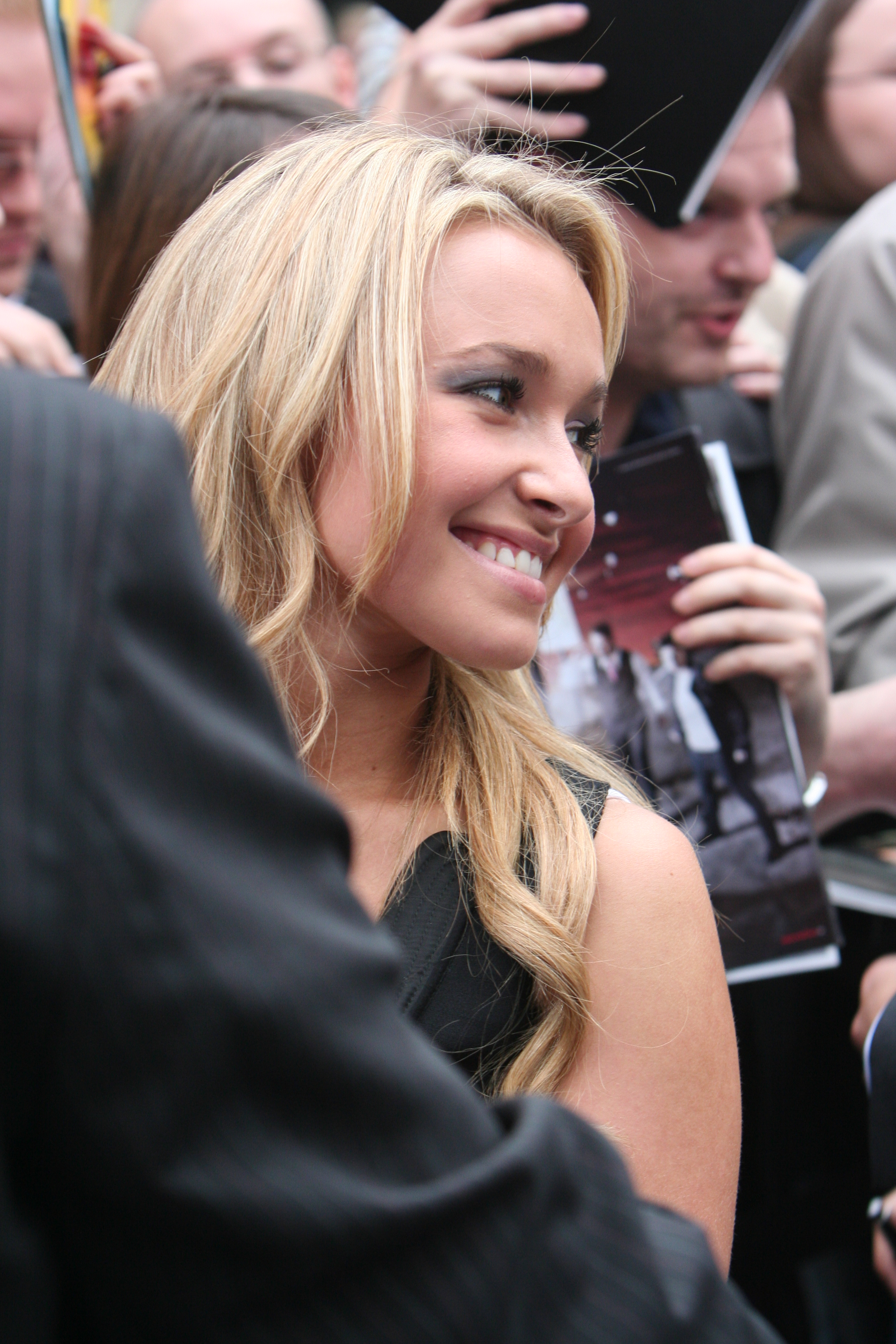
Hayden Panettiere stars as Juliette Barnes

British actor Sam Palladio was the first regular member to be cast, being announced on February 14, 2012. Australian actress and singer Clare Bowen was the next addition to the pilot, as Scarlett O'Connor, on February 17, 2012. On February 22, General Hospital cast member Jonathan Jackson joined the cast in the role of Avery Barkley. On February 23, Emmy Award winner Powers Boothe joined the cast as Lamar Wyatt, the father of the lead character. On February 29, it was announced that Hayden Panettiere had landed the role of Juliette Barnes, originally planned as the primary antagonist of the series. On March 1, 2012 Robert Wisdom was cast as Coleman Carlisle, one of the supporting regular characters. On March 5 Eric Close joined the ensemble cast as Teddy Conrad, Rayna's husband. On March 6, it was announced that Connie Britton would play leading role of Rayna Jaymes, 40-year-old fading country superstar. Britton also serves as a co-executive producer of the series. On March 13, 2012, Charles Esten joined the cast in the final regular role of Deacon Claybourne, Rayna's bandmate and former lover.

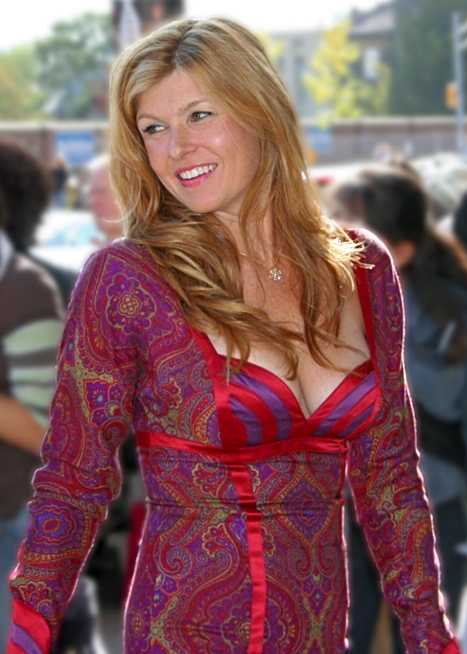
Connie Britton stars as Rayna Jaymes

Britton stated that her character, Rayna was based on several country singers, including Faith Hill, Reba McEntire, and Bonnie Raitt. Panettiere denied that her character resembled Taylor Swift, and stated that Juliette was instead based on herself—a young woman in the entertainment industry—and Carrie Underwood.

Alongside the nine regular cast members during the first season, several actors were cast in recurring roles. Judith Hoag appeared in the series as Tandy Hampton, Rayna's sister. Sylvia Jefferies played the role of Jolene Barnes, Juliette's mother. On August 29, 2012, it was announced that Kimberly Williams-Paisley joined the cast as Margaret "Peggy" Kenter. JD Souther, Rya Kihlstedt, Tilky Montgomery Jones, Wyclef Jean, Susan Misner and Michiel Huisman also had major recurring roles during the first season.

For the second season, Chris Carmack, who recurred in six episodes of season one as Will Lexington, the rising country star struggling with the realization that he might be gay, as well as Lennon Stella and Maisy Stella as Rayna's daughters, were promoted to regulars. Aubrey Peeples and Chaley Rose joined the cast in major recurring roles as Layla Grant, a runner-up in a singing competition and a new singer in Nashville who is a new rival for Juliette, and Zoey, Scarlett's childhood best friend who moves to Nashville. Oliver Hudson was cast as Jeff Fordham, the new CEO of Edgehill. Christina Chang also joined the cast as Megan Vannoy, love interest for Deacon, and Will Chase as Luke Wheeler, love interest for Rayna and currently the biggest male country artist. Charlie Bewley also appeared in the multi-episode arc as Charles Wentworth, a married businessman, who had an affair with Juliette.

For the third season, Will Chase and Oliver Hudson were promoted to regulars after recurring performances in season two. Tony Award winner Laura Benanti was cast in the recurring role of country star Sadie Stone. Singer Brette Taylor was cast as Pam York, Luke's new backup singer, and Alexa PenaVega for a multi-episode arc as Kiley, Gunnar's first love. Dancing with the Stars' Derek Hough also joined the cast for a multi-episode arc as Noah West. Grammy winner, Christina Aguilera joined the show later in season three as pop superstar Jade St. John for a multi-episode arc. on May 31, 2015, it was announced Eric Close would not be returning for the fourth season, his character was sent to prison. On July 22, 2015, it was announced that Aubrey Peeples was promoted to regular, and Oliver Hudson moved from regular to recurring. On October 13, 2015, it was announced that Panettiere was taking medical leave from the series for treatment for postpartum depression, which her character was also suffering from. In June 2016, it was announced that Aubrey Peeples and Will Chase would not continue on the series after its shift to CMT. They were the first two cast members to be cut as producers tried to bring down production costs. Britton chose to leave the series halfway through the fifth season. Later series regulars included Rachel Bilson, as Alyssa Greene who joined halfway through season five, and Cameron Scoggins as Zach Welles, who was promoted to a series regular halfway through the season. Kaitlin Doubleday was added to the main cast partway through the fifth season, as Jessie Caine, a mother and singer who returns to the scene. Jeffrey Nordling, who recurred during season five, was upped to a series regular for the sixth season, and plays Jessie's ex-husband, record label owner, and Jake's dad.

=== Music ===
Creative executive producer Callie Khouri's husband T-Bone Burnett was the show's executive music producer and composer for the first season. When departing the series, his manager cited commitments to other projects, although Burnett later stated that he was also upset with television executives' treatment of his wife. His assistant and the managing producer Buddy Miller took over for Burnett in season two.

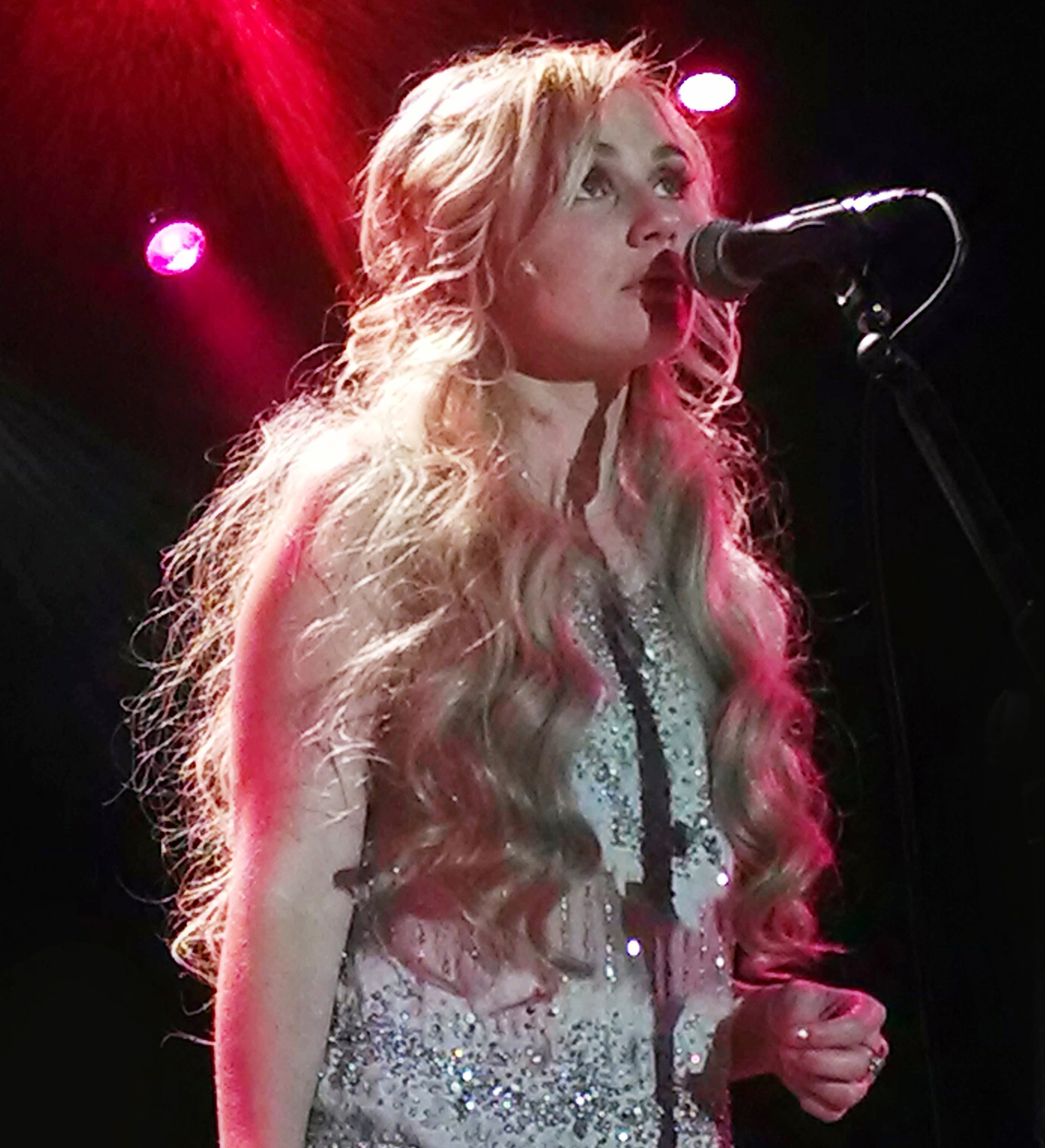
Clare Bowen at the stage in May 2014 during Nashville cast tour

On October 2, 2012, it was announced that Big Machine Records was going to release all covers and original songs from the series. Some songs are written by John Paul White of The Civil Wars, Hillary Lindsey, and Elvis Costello. On November 13, 2012, Big Machine announced the release of The Music of Nashville: Season 1 Volume 1 Original Soundtrack on December 11, 2012.

The Music of Nashville: Season 1 Volume 2 was released on May 7, 2013. The Music of Nashville, Season 1: The Complete Collection, a four-disc set, was released in the UK on September 23, 2013. This set includes the songs that were digitally released as singles in North America but not in the UK. Despite the title, it omits three of Connie Britton's songs ("Already Gone," "American Beauty" and "Stompin' Grounds") as well as Sam Palladio and David Clayton Rogers' cover of "I'm A Lonesome Fugitive." The Music of Nashville: Season 2, Volume 1 was released by Big Machine on December 10, 2013.

An album of the music performed on the TV concert special Nashville: On the Record by many of the cast and the songwriters was released to digital download on April 22, the day before the special aired on ABC. The following compilation albums have also been released to download:

- Clare Bowen As Scarlett O'Connor: Season One (April 29, 2014; featuring 13 tracks)
- Hayden Panettiere As Juliette Barnes: Season One (May 6, 2014; featuring 16 tracks, including two versions each of "Undermine" and "Consider Me")
- Hayden Panettiere As Juliette Barnes: Season Two (May 13, 2014; featuring 9 tracks)
- Clare Bowen As Scarlett O'Connor: Season Two (May 13, 2014; featuring 9 tracks)
- The Nashville Cast Featuring Lennon & Maisy Stella As Maddie & Daphne Conrad (November 20, 2015; featuring 11 tracks)

The Music of Nashville: Season 2, Volume 2 was released on May 6, 2014.

Christmas With Nashville, an album featuring seasonal music performed by most of the main cast, was released on November 4, 2014. Unlike the other albums, the music was not heard on the series (with the exception of "Baby, It's Cold Outside," performed by Britton and Will Chase).

The Music of Nashville: Season 3, Volume 1 was released on December 9, 2014.

Nashville: On the Record 2 aired on March 25, 2015, featuring most of the main cast plus Deana Carter and Reba McEntire. An album of the music performed (other than McEntire's) was released to digital download. One of the most intriguing features of this album was Charles Esten's songwriting debut with Deana Carter on "I Know How To Love You Now" which he performed live during the season three premiere.

The Music of Nashville: Season 3, Volume 2 was released on May 12, 2015.

The Music of Nashville: Season 4, Volume 1 was released on December 4, 2015.

Nashville: On the Record 3 (Live), featuring performances from many of the cast in concert, was released on December 16, 2015, to digital download.

The Music of Nashville: Season 4, Volume 2 was released on May 13, 2016

The Music of Nashville: Season 5, Volume 1 was released on March 10, 2017.

The Music of Nashville: Season 5, Volume 2 was released on June 1, 2017.

The Music of Nashville: Season 5, Volume 3 was released on August 10, 2017.

Starting with season six, an EP was released each week digitally containing that week's songs.

The Music of Nashville: Season 6, Volume 1 was released on February 23, 2018.

The Music of Nashville: Season 6, Volume 2 was released on July 27, 2018.

The Best of Nashville, a compilation CD of the series' entire catalog, was released on November 2, 2018.

The show's entire score was released digitally on November 2, 2018.

=== Tours ===
After successful American tours in 2014 and 2015, dates in the United Kingdom and Ireland were announced along with further US performances in 2016. More UK performances followed in 2017. Another US tour in the summer of 2017, and a final UK tour came in spring 2018; the tour was kicked off with a final season celebration at the Grand Ole Opry on March 25, 2018. The 2026 Encore Tour sees Bowen, Esten, Jackson and Palladio return to the UK as well as performing in Germany and Switzerland for the first time. The tour commenced in the US on January 23, 2026.

=== Cancellation and move to CMT ===
On May 12, 2016 ABC cancelled the country music drama after a season of flagging ratings. The cancellation came as a surprise due to the fact that the network had named new show runners Marshall Herskovitz and Ed Zwick prior to the cancellation, and previous network president Paul Lee had stated that "Nashville has a lot more story to tell" during the TCA winter press tour. Amidst the cancellation, Lionsgate TV was so confident in its efforts to find a new home for Nashville that the studio opted to forgo the happily-ever-after alternative series ending it had planned in order to give closure to fans, and go instead with a cliffhanger ending in the season 4 finale. Fans began to doubt the efforts of Lionsgate when actress and executive producer Connie Britton began to embark on what seemed to be a swan song of nighttime talk show appearances.

Over 171,000 signatures were received on a #BringBackNashville petition. The night of the season finale Lionsgate tweeted "#Nashies What a cliffhanger! But we won't leave you hanging. There's more story to be told. #BringBackNashville." The producing partner had already been fielding offers from four or five networks. As the negotiations began to draw to a close, it was rumored that the announcement would be made during the high-profile CMT Music Awards. When no announcement was made, fans began to doubt the show's return. On June 10, 2016, CMT released a press statement stating that a deal had been made with CMT and Hulu. CMT would air a full season of 22 episodes, and Hulu would make them available the next day as well as carry the entirety of the shows backlog. The pick-up was assisted by $11 million in economic incentives: $8.5 million coming via the State of Tennessee Film Office, $1 million from the City of Nashville, $1 million from the Nashville Convention & Visitor Corp., and $500,000 from Ryman Hospitality. It was announced on June 29, 2016, that all cast members with the exception of Will Chase and Aubrey Peeples would return for season 5.

=== Aftershow ===
On January 4, 2017, CMT announced that there would be a Nashville aftershow entitled NashChat. Nashchat aired live across social media platforms immediately following every new episode. It was interactive with the fans, and featured a cast member appearing each week. The host of Nashchat is a co-host of the morning radio show The Bobby Bones Show, Amy Brown. NashChat did not return for season six. As of February 21, 2020, the episodes are available on CMT's official YouTube account.

== Reception ==
=== Ratings ===
Season	Timeslot (ET)	Episodes	Premiered			Ended			TV season	Rank	Viewers (in millions)	18–49 rating (average)
Season	Timeslot (ET)	Episodes	Date	Premiere viewers (millions)	18–49 rating	Date	Finale viewers (millions)	18–49 rating	TV season	Rank	Viewers (in millions)	18–49 rating (average)
1	Wednesday; 10:00 pm	21	October 10, 2012	8.93	2.8	May 22, 2013	6.02	1.9	2012–13	64	6.86	1.87
2	Wednesday; 10:00 pm	22	September 25, 2013	6.50	2.0	May 14, 2014	5.24	1.3	2013–14	62	7.00	1.47
3	Wednesday; 10:00 pm	22	September 24, 2014	5.80	1.5	May 13, 2015	4.65	1.2	2014–15	54	7.44	1.34
4	Wednesday; 10:00 pm	21	September 23, 2015	4.91	1.2	May 25, 2016	4.19	0.9	2015–16	70	6.21	0.94
5	Thursday 9:00 pm (1, 3–22); Thursday 10:00 pm (2)	22	January 5, 2017	1.74	0.5	August 10, 2017	0.68	0.2	2016–17	N/A	0.82	0.19
6	Thursday 9:00 pm	16	January 4, 2018	0.87	0.2	July 26, 2018	0.88	0.2	2017–18	N/A	0.74	0.14

=== Critical reception ===
Critical response of Nashville
Season	Rotten Tomatoes	Metacritic
1	92% (50 reviews)	85 (32 reviews)
2	100% (9 reviews)	—N/a
3	100% (8 reviews)	—N/a
4	89% (9 reviews)	—N/a
5	86% (7 reviews)	82 (4 reviews)
6	80% (5 reviews)	—N/a

==== Season 1 ====
The first season received critical acclaim. Metacritic gave the show a rating of 84 out of 100 or "universal acclaim" based on 32 reviews. On Rotten Tomatoes, it has a rating of 92% based on 50 reviews, and the average rating is 8.58/10. The consensus on the site reads "Nashville promotes catchy pop-western tunes and plays to non-fans of the genre with its sharp atmosphere and its stellar narratives." Season one was called one of the most exciting new series of the 2012 Fall season. Alan Sepinwell stated that the series was "a smart mix of soap opera, music and political intrigue." The series drew more soap comparison, with David Hiltbrand drawing comparisons to hit-soap, Dynasty, and praising the dynamic of leads Rayna, and Juliette. The performances of Britton, Panettiere and Boothe received critical acclaim.

==== Season 2 ====
The second season received positive reviews, with a rating of 100% based on nine reviews on Rotten Tomatoes.

==== Season 3 ====
Season three also earned positive reviews. Rotten Tomatoes gave the season a rating of 100% based on eight reviews, the average rating is 8/10. Critics praised the season's continuing good quality, with Rolling Stone saying "It's nice to call Nashville – and to have Nashville – home."

==== Season 4 ====
The fourth season opened to positive reviews, scoring an 89% on Rotten Tomatoes. Critics praised Hayden Panettiere's performance, with Lindsay MacDonald stating "First of all, a round of applause for Hayden Panettiere and her amazing range. She portrayed the full spectrum of emotion, from flirty to bitchy to carefree to decimated. She might be all over the board, but she owns every single scene.", and the general consensus praising the show's soap elements, and the general music focus. Kaitlin Thomas from TV.com claimed that the series was "the greatest modern soap the world has ever seen".

==== Season 5 ====
The season five premiere was well received. Most critics praised the season premiere, stating "The original tenor of the series is one of the things that made it so appealing in the first place. Add to this that the tempo of the narrative is ideal, and episodes never drag", though Gwen Ihnat from The A.V. Club criticized the season, stating "Nashville now almost always bums me out, even more so because it used to be a show I once looked forward to every week. But I haven't felt that way in quite a while now."

==== Season 6 ====
Rotten Tomatoes gives the season an 80%, based on six critics, the lowest of all seasons. Entertainment Weekly's Kristen Baldwin gave the season a B+, and stated "In the end, Nashville remained true to its central love story." Ken Tucker of Yahoo! TV gave a positive review, and wrote "When you combine this bubbly soap opera material with amusingly lively scenes of Will, Avery, and Gunnar getting together to form the band you didn't know you'd always wanted, Nashville seems to be going out with an enjoyable blast." New York Magazine gave the season premiere a 3/5. Conversely, Savannah Brooks of The Young Folks claims that "the characters used to be happy and have a purpose. It's time to stop letting one character's death dictate the rest of the series", in regards to the sixth season, rating it a 4/10. TVLine cited the cult plotline of the season as one of the worst plot twists of the last decade.

=== Awards and nominations ===
In June 2012, Nashville was one of five honorees in the Most Exciting New Series category at the Critics' Choice Television Awards, voted by journalists who had seen the television pilots for the 2012–13 season. The pilot episode received critical acclaim, specifically praising Callie Khouri's writing, casting, and the performances of Connie Britton and Hayden Panettiere. At the 70th Golden Globe Awards, Britton was nominated for Best Actress and Panettiere was nominated for Best Supporting Actress, while the series was nominated for Favorite New TV Drama at the 39th People's Choice Awards and Best New Series at the 65th Writers Guild of America Awards; Britton was also nominated for Outstanding Lead Actress in a Drama Series at the Primetime Emmy Awards. At the 71st Golden Globe Awards, Panettiere received a second nomination for Best Supporting Actress. At the 6th Critics' Choice Television Awards, Panettiere was nominated for Best Supporting Actress in a Drama Series and Jonathan Jackson was nominated for Best Supporting Actor in a Drama Series.

Year	Association	Category	Nominee(s)	Result	Ref.
2012	Critics' Choice Television Awards	Most Exciting New Series	Nashville	Won	
2012	People's Choice Awards	Favorite New TV Drama	Nashville	Nominated	
2012	Satellite Awards	Best Actress – Television Series Drama	Connie Britton	Nominated	
2012	Satellite Awards	Best Actress – Television Series Drama	Hayden Panettiere	Nominated	
2012	Satellite Awards	Best Supporting Actor – Series, Miniseries or Television Film	Powers Boothe	Nominated	
2012	Satellite Awards	Best Television Series – Drama	Nashville	Nominated	
2013	American Cinema Editors	Best Edited One-Hour Series for Commercial Television	Nashville	Nominated	
2013	Costume Designers Guild Awards	Outstanding Contemporary Television Series	Susie DeSanto	Nominated	
2013	Golden Globe Awards	Best Actress – Television Series Drama	Connie Britton	Nominated	
2013	Golden Globe Awards	Best Supporting Actress – Series, Miniseries or Television Film	Hayden Panettiere	Nominated	
2013	People's Choice Awards	Favorite Network TV Drama	Nashville	Nominated	
2013	Primetime Emmy Awards	Outstanding Lead Actress in a Drama Series	Connie Britton	Nominated	
2013	Primetime Emmy Awards	Outstanding Original Music and Lyrics	Sarah Buxton & Kate York ("Nothing in This World Will Ever Break My Heart Again")	Nominated	
2013	Teen Choice Awards	Choice TV Actress: Drama	Hayden Panettiere	Nominated	
2013	Teen Choice Awards	Choice TV Show: Drama	Nashville	Nominated	
2013	Writers Guild of America Awards	New Series	Nashville	Nominated	
2013	Guild of Music Supervisors Awards	Best Music Supervision in a Television Musical or Comedy	Frankie Pine	Nominated	
2014	Golden Globe Awards	Best Supporting Actress – Series, Miniseries or Television Film	Hayden Panettiere	Nominated	
2014	People's Choice Awards	Favorite Dramatic TV Actress	Hayden Panettiere	Nominated	
2014	Costume Designers Guild Awards	Outstanding Contemporary Television Series	Susie DeSanto	Nominated	
2014	Guild of Music Supervisors Awards	Best Music Supervision in a Television Musical or Comedy	Frankie Pine	Won	
2014	Hollywood Music In Media Awards (HMMA)	Outstanding Music Supervision – Television	Frankie Pine	Nominated	
2014	Motion Picture Sound Editors, USA	Best Sound Editing – Short Form Musical in Television	Greg Vines, Jen Monnar, Michael Poole & Sean Alexander ("Tomorrow Never Comes")	Nominated	
2014	Prism Awards	Female Performance in a Drama Series Multi-Episode Storyline	Hayden Panettiere	Nominated	
2014	Prism Awards	Drama Series Multi-Episode Storyline – Substance Use	Nashville	Nominated	
2015	CMT Artists of the Year	International Impact Award	Nashville	Won	
2015	Location Managers Guild International Awards (LMGI)	Outstanding Locations in a Contemporary Television Series	Kristi Frankenheimer & Mark Ragland	Nominated	
2015	Teen Choice Awards	Choice TV Actress: Drama	Hayden Panettiere	Nominated	
2015	Teen Choice Awards	Choice TV Show: Drama	Nashville	Nominated	
2015	Guild of Music Supervisors Awards	Best Music Supervision in a Television Musical or Comedy	Frankie Pine	Won	
2016	Critics' Choice Television Awards	Best Supporting Actor in a Drama Series	Jonathan Jackson	Nominated	
2016	Critics' Choice Television Awards	Best Supporting Actress in a Drama Series	Hayden Panettiere	Nominated	
2016	GLAAD Awards	Outstanding Drama Series	Nashville	Nominated	
2016	Voice Awards	Strengthening Families through Hope and Help – Television Productions	Nashville	Won	
2016	Guild of Music Supervisors Awards	Best Music Supervision in a Television Comedy or Musical	Frankie Pine	Nominated	
2016	Guild of Music Supervisors Awards	Best Song/Recording Created for Television	"Longer"	Nominated	
2016	Motion Picture Sound Editors, USA	Best Sound Editing – Short Form Musical in Television	Jaclyn Newman Dorn & Sean Alexander ("How Can I Help You Say Goodbye?")	Nominated	
2017	Academy of Country Music	Tex Ritter Film Award	Nashville	Won	
2017	Motion Picture Sound Editors, USA	Best Sound Editing – Short Form Musical in Television	Jaclyn Newman Dorn & Sean Alexander ("Didn't Expect it to Go Down This Way")	Nominated	
2018	GLAAD Awards	Outstanding Drama Series	Nashville	Nominated	
2018	Guild of Music Supervisors Awards	Best Music Supervision in a Television Comedy or Musical	Frankie Pine and Mandi Collier	Nominated	
2018	Guild of Music Supervisors Awards	Best Song/Recording Created for Television	"Sanctuary"	Nominated	

== Syndication ==
Hulu acquired the streaming rights to all seasons of the show for the United States for its subscription tiers. Later, AXS TV secured a deal for off-network cable rights for the series and currently airs repeats. During the transition from ABC to CMT, Hulu acquired the exclusive streaming rights to Nashville's catalogue.

== Home media ==
Region 1 DVDs are distributed by Walt Disney Studios Home Entertainment under the ABC Studios label, while the region 2 and 4 DVDs are distributed by Lionsgate Home Entertainment.

Season	Episodes	DVD release date		
Season	Episodes	Region 1	Region 2	Region 4
1	21	September 17, 2013	July 15, 2013	April 23, 2014
2	22	September 23, 2014	July 7, 2014	April 15, 2015
3	22	September 1, 2015	October 12, 2015	December 9, 2015
4	21	February 21, 2017	January 16, 2017	November 30, 2016
5	22	N/A	October 9, 2017	May 2, 2018
Seasons 1–5	108	N/A	October 9, 2017	N/A
Nashville in Concert at the Royal Albert Hall	1	April 27, 2018	April 27, 2018	N/A
Seasons 1–6	124	N/A	August 13, 2018	September 5, 2018
6	16	N/A	August 13, 2018	September 5, 2018

== Impact ==
The series has been noted multiple times for its impact on the economy of the state of Tennessee and is credited with increasing tourism to the city and the state. The director of the Grand Ole Opry has stated that the series brought awareness to the arena, while the Tennessean reports that the series brought an "incredible wave of growth, media attention and tourism for its namesake city". Butch Spyridon, president and CEO of the Nashville Convention & Visitors Corporation, claimed that the show was a "huge [...] marketing asset, has put an important spotlight on our songwriter community and the cast members have been incredible advocates for [the city] as well". The series also brought a wave of tourism to the city, with 1 in 5 visitors to the city attributed to having watched the series. Nashville viewers also spent more money and stayed longer in town than usual visitors. Erika Woolam Nichols, COO of The Bluebird Cafe, which was often promoted on the series, stated that "[The Bluebird] [has] had a lot more interest in the venue from the general public; not just music fans as in the past but a greater cross-section of the population. Now our shows sell out in minutes rather than a few days", while noting that the venue has "lots of people who just want to have their picture taken in front of the club." With the series being "a brand" for ABC and Disney, the network set up several Nashville-themed tours and activities; including a four-day, three-night tour package. Further reflecting the series' status as a brand, several displays and promotional posters are on display at Disney World in the ABC Commissary Restaurant.

== Broadway adaptation ==
On March 5, 2019, it was announced that Scott Delman had acquired the theatrical rights to the series to produce a Broadway musical adaptation of the series with an all-new score.

== Bluebird Reunion ==
Several of the series' cast members, including Clare Bowen, Sam Palladio, and Jonathan Jackson reunited for the CMT documentary film Bluebird. The special aired on February 19, 2020, on CMT and was an in-depth look at the Bluebird Cafe in Nashville, where the show shot many scenes throughout its run. Also featured in the documentary were many prominent musicians, including Maren Morris, Kacey Musgraves, Taylor Swift, and several more.

== Reunion concerts ==
In 2024, Charles Esten, Clare Bowen, Jonathan Jackson, and Sam Palladio reunited for two concerts, one in Atlanta and one in Nashville, where they performed songs from the series, as well as their own original songs. In 2026, they also reunited for a 16-date concert tour, mostly consisting of concerts in Europe, with the same concert format.
