= Rayna Jaymes =

- Nashville character
- Connie Britton as Rayna Jaymes
- Portrayed by: Connie Britton
- Duration: 2012–17, 2018
- First appearance: October 10, 2012 (episode 1.01; "Pilot")
- Last appearance: July 26, 2018 (episode 6.16; "Beyond the Sunset)
- Created by: Callie Khouri
In-universe information
- Occupation: Singer-songwriter; Record executive
- Father: Lamar Wyatt
- Mother: Virginia Wyatt
- Sisters: Tandy Hampton
- Spouse: Teddy Conrad (ex-husband); Deacon Claybourne (husband)
- Daughters: Maddie Conrad; Daphne Conrad
- Other relatives: Maggie Monahan; Jimmy Monahan

Rayna Alisia Jaymes (née Wyatt; previously Conrad) is a fictional character and one of two leads in the ABC/CMT musical drama series Nashville. Rayna has been portrayed by actress Connie Britton since the series' pilot episode, which aired on October 10, 2012.

Britton has received critical acclaim for her performance as Rayna. She was nominated for a Golden Globe Award for Best Actress – Television Series Drama, a Primetime Emmy Award for Outstanding Lead Actress in a Drama Series, and a Satellite Award for Best Actress – Television Series Drama.

== Casting and creation ==
Connie Britton was cast as Rayna Jaymes on March 6, 2012. Rayna was characterized as the "reigning queen of country," a 40-year-old country music superstar singer whose star is beginning to fade. The character of Rayna Jaymes is inspired from Britton's role as Tami Taylor on the TV series Friday Night Lights, with Nashville creator Callie Khouri creating the role specifically for Britton. Britton has stated that her performance as Jaymes is based on several country singers, including Faith Hill, Reba McEntire, and Bonnie Raitt. The Nashville writers also consulted country star Sara Evans when creating Jaymes' character so that her experience of being a working mother in the music industry could be accurately portrayed.

== Background ==
Rayna Jaymes is a nine-time Grammy Award–winner, fifteen-time CMA Award–nominee, who was inducted into the Grand Ole Opry in 2005. She is the daughter of the late Virginia Wyatt and her husband, the late politician Lamar Wyatt (played by Powers Boothe) whom she was estranged from before he died due to him never approving of her career leading to her being kicked out at 16. Early in her career she dated songwriter and guitar player Deacon Claybourne at 16. In 1990, she released of her debut hit album Cowgirls Love Too Hard which featured the hit "Changing Grounds". The couple worked together for a large part of Jaymes' 90s catalogue as he was her lead guitarist for two decades on tour and a frequent collaborator. Jaymes' second album Southside of Love (1991) expanded her new age country sound that merged new age with traditional country. Jaymes' third album Home (1993) is recognized as one of the best country albums of the 1990s as it featured the iconic "No One Will Ever Love You". She followed this with the critically acclaimed Thoroughbred (1995) album which features the classic "The Last Stand". Her follow up album was the multi platinum Postcards from Mexico (1996). Ultimately Rayna had personal issues and had to break up with Deacon due to his destructive patterns after multiple iconic albums and tours worked on together. While Deacon was in rehab, Jaymes began dating and married financial advisor Teddy Conrad. The couple moved to a mansion in Nashville during the height of Jaymes music career and had two daughters together, Maddie and Daphne. Teddy though is not Maddie's biological father, she is Deacon's child, though Deacon and Maddie did not know until she was 12. Rayna's next album was the best selling female country album of the year, Sweet & Sorrow (1997). Her follow up displayed a newer image for the married woman and a increasingly mature sound for the hit album Platinum Sea (1998) which features the hit "American Beauty". Maddie was born in 1999, the same year as Rayna's smash album Until You Kissed Me & multi-platinum song "This Love Ain't Big Enough". Daphne was born in 2004, a year after the release of Jaymes' multi-platinum record Double Down featuring the fan favorite song "Already Gone" which peaked at No. 1 on the country and pop charts.

She followed this up with her greatest hits album The Best Of Rayna Jaymes (2006). 2008 was another very successful era for Jaymes with her multi-platinum Little Bits of Heaven. In 2010, she released her first self-titled album Rayna Jaymes and followed it up in 2012, with the gold selling Belt Buckle Blues featuring top 20 country single "It's My Life". Though the album was her first to miss the top 10 landing in the 20s and falling on the charts in its following week. She ultimately canceled her Belt Buckle Blues Tour and co-headlined with country-pop singer Juliette Barnes on the single "Wrong Song". It was an instant hit and the two co-headlined the Red Lips White Lies Tour. Rayna then began her own record label, Highway 65 Records in 2014, which she announced at the Grand Ole Opry. The Red Lips White Lies Tour was a sell out but was stopped at a halt after the death of Juliette's mother, the near death of Rayna's father, and then the near death car crash of Rayna with Deacon that led to her being in a coma for two weeks. Once she recovered she suffered from vocal damage and decided to take time off to spend with her daughters.

Though her follow up album was almost complete, her label wanted to rush release the album to capitalize on the publics re-found love for Jaymes after her near death accident. Against Jaymes demands the label had police seize Jaymes for the masters to her album, threw out certain tracks, produced an album cover which featured her coming out of fire, and re-titled it '"Rising Out of the Ashes"'. This led to her buying herself out of Edgehill Republic Records that year for a total of $20,000,000. The first release off of her label was her highly anticipated comeback album The Parts I Remember in 2015, which debuted at number 1 on both the Billboard 200 Chart and the Billboard Country chart. This album was recorded while under Edgehill and was her first album following her deadly car crash in 2013. The record ultimately was certified gold and its lead single "This Time" was certified platinum. She then went on to win five CMA's including 'Album of the Year', 'Song of the Year', 'Female Vocalist of the Year', 'Record of the Year', and 'Entertainer of the Year'.

In 2015, Rayna made the transition from singer to producer. She produced Markus Keens' first solo album which would later be certified platinum.

Rayna has a catalogue of hit song after hit songs which include "Already Gone," "This Time," "The Last Stand," "Stompin' Grounds," "Changing Grounds," "This Love Ain't Big Enough," "Postcards from Mexico," "Buried Under," "Ball and Chain," and "American Beauty." She also has a hit of ballads which she is well known for including "Sanctuary," "No One Will Ever Love You," "Don't Leave Without Me," "The Rivers Between Us," "This Could Be Us," "Stronger Than Me," and "Together We Stand."

== Discography ==
=== Albums ===
- Cowgirls Love Too Hard (1990) - Sold 1 Million Copies
- Southside of Love (1991)
- Home (1993)
- Thoroughbred (1995)
- Postcards from Mexico (1996)
- Sweet & Sorrow (1997)
- Platinum Sea (1998) – Sold 3 Million Copies
- Until You Kissed Me (1999) – Sold 9 Million Copies
- Big Open Skies (2000)
- Double Down (2003)
- The Best Of Rayna Jaymes (2006) Compilation
- Little Bits of Heaven (2008) – Sold 6 Million Copies
- Rayna Jaymes (2010)
- Belt Buckle Blues (2012)
- Rising Out of the Ashes (2013)
- Four Platinum Albums (2014) Compilation
- The Parts I Remember (2015)
- Our Truth (2017) with Deacon Claybourne

=== Singles ===
1990: "Changing Ground"

1991: "Wayfaring Stranger"

1993: "No One Will Ever Love You" (feat. Deacon Claybourne)

1995: "American Beauty"

1995: "Sanctuary"

1996: "Postcards from Mexico" (feat. Deacon Claybourne)

1996: "The Rivers Between Us" (feat. Deacon Claybourne)

1997: "The Best Songs Come from Broken Hearts"

1999: "This Love Ain't Big Enough"

1999: "Surrender" (feat. Deacon Claybourne)

2003: "Already Gone"

2006: "I Wanna Do (Everything for You)"

2008: "The End of the Day"

2012: "It's My Life"

2012: "Stomping Ground"

2012: "Buried Under"

2012: "Wrong Song" (feat. Juliette Barnes)

2013: "Stronger Than Me"

2014: "Ball & Chain" (feat. Luke Wheeler)

2014: "This Time"

2014: "Lies of the Lonely"

2014: "He Ain't Gonna Change" ((feat. Juliette Barnes)

2014: "Gasoline and Matches" ((feat. Sadie Stone)

2015: "Take Mine (feat. Autumn Chase)

2016: "Hold Onto Me"

2016: "Strong Tonight"

2016: "Together We Stand" (feat. Daphne Conrad)

2017: "Can't Remember Never Loving You" (feat. Deacon Claybourne)

2017: "My Favorite Hurricane" (feat. Deacon Claybourne)

2017: "You're Mine" (feat. Juliette Barnes, Gunnar Scott, Avery Barkley, Will Lexington, Scarlett O'Connor, Maddie Conrad, Daphne Conrad)

=== Tours ===
- Cowgirls Love Too Hard Tour (1990)
- No One Will Ever Love You Tour (1996)
- Until You Kissed Me All Access Tour (1999)
- Big Open Skies Tour (2000)
- Double Down Tour (2003)
- Little Bits of Heaven World Tour (2008)
- Belt Buckle Blues Tour (2012) cancelled to co-headline with Juliette Barnes)
- Red Lips White Lies Tour (2012) co-headlined with Juliette Barnes)
- Ride Easy Tour (The Parts I Remember Tour) (2014)
- Rayna Jaymes Live Tour (2015)

=== Labels ===
Edgehill Republic Entertainment Records: (1990–2013) Highway 65 Records: (2013–2017)

== Storylines ==
=== Season 1 ===
After two decades of topping the charts, Rayna Jaymes' career has begun to fall. Her latest album flopped so her record label suggests she open for the young country pop star Juliette Barnes (Hayden Panettiere). Juliette hates Rayna because her mother Jolene (Sylvia Jefferies), whose relationship with Juliette is deeply troubled, was a Rayna James fan. When the president of their label, Marshall Evans, suggests that Rayna should collaborate with Juliette at a party for Edgehill — impressing upon each artist the penalties the label will impose for refusing — they write a song together. After their duet "Wrong Song" becomes a success, the two go on to co-headline a tour together. While Rayna is on tour Teddy visits her, telling her that he wants a divorce.

When Marshall threatens to release a Greatest Hits album against her will, Rayna decides to work on a new album with a non-country producer, Liam McGuinness. At first, Liam doesn't want to work with her. He changes his mind and then joins her band. When Rayna has the idea to start her own label, Liam does something behind her back. She fires him and dissolves their partnership. The two later reconcile and continue to work on her album. While they are on a break from the tour, Liam asks Rayna to spend the weekend away with him in St. Lucia. While she is packing for the trip, she realizes it feels wrong for her to go. She then goes to Deacon and tells him that she loves him and always has. The two spend the night together.

The morning after Rayna tells Tandy that she and Deacon spent the night together. Tandy says it was just one night – a fling – and Rayna replies that it will never be one night or a fling with them because how they have always had a relationship. Tandy mentions how it's always been all or nothing between them and asks her if that is what she and Deacon want. Teddy is not excited when he finds out that Rayna and Deacon may now be a couple. He is against it because there is a chance of Deacon finding out that he is Maddie's biological father. Teddy tells her they made an agreement when Maddie was born and she has to honor it. Rayna promises him that she would never want to hurt their relationship and plans on keeping it a secret. After Maddie overhears her mother telling someone "I love you" on the phone she asks who she said that to. Rayna tells her she said that to Deacon and that they are together now. Later in the day when Rayna and Teddy are not home, Maddie snoops through her mother's closet and finds a box that contains a paternity test. Maddie talks to a friend over the phone and says that Teddy might not be her father. The next day Maddie tells Deacon that he might be her father, which leaves Deacon shocked. Backstage at the CMA Awards, Deacon confronts Rayna about him possibly being Maddie's biological father.

Rayna tells him the whole story of how she found out she was pregnant the last time he went to rehab. She talked about it with Teddy and they decided to get married and do a paternity test afterwards. Deacon's friend and sobriety sponsor Coleman advised Rayna to cut ties with Deacon because they wanted him to get better. Teddy and Rayna wanted what was best for Maddie. Deacon storms off and goes to a bar and begins to drink again. On the night Juliette plays a show at the Bluebird Cafe, Rayna runs after a drunk Deacon who leaves the café when the two notice each other. Rayna tells him that he is not driving anywhere and makes him move over to the passenger seat. On the way home the two argue which prevents Rayna from stopping at a stop sign. While swerving around the oncoming traffic, the car flips several times and lands in a ditch.

=== Season 2 ===
Rayna is put in a medically induced coma and hangs on to life for two weeks following the wreck. Deacon tells he was the one driving and pleads guilty of driving under the influence. Rayna wakes up and is able to say that she was the one driving the car and Deacon is set free. There are several flashbacks showing Rayna's and Deacon's lives around the time she got pregnant with Maddie. During the flashbacks, it is revealed that Deacon's proposal to Rayna was followed by Maddie's conception. The morning after, Rayna realizes that Deacon had been drinking and didn't realize he had proposed. She gives back the ring and leaves him. She finds out that she's pregnant and almost tells Deacon, but she sees him drunk, tearing up his cabin, and Tandy suggests not telling him about the pregnancy.

Rayna struggles to get out of her contract with Edgehill and butts heads with the label's new CEO, Jeff Fordham, when he steals Will Lexington from Highway 65 and threatens to release a Rayna Jaymes Greatest Hits album against her will. Her father was going to loan her money to get her out of it but he was sent to prison before he had the chance to. She is eventually able to get out of her contract by using her mortgage. Tandy finds out Lamar was involved with the car crash that killed their mother but can't say anything about it. Rayna eventually finds out. Soon after Lamar is released from prison he suffers a fatal heart attack while visiting Teddy at his office.

During the season, Rayna and Deacon are able to repair their friendship following the events of the wreck and his discovery that he is Maddie's biological father. Maddie and Deacon spend more time together, and he gives her music lessons, much to Teddy's dislike. Also during the season, Rayna begins dating fellow country music singer, Luke Wheeler. When Maddie uploads a video of herself singing, using Deacon's last name, the media soon finds out the truth about her paternity. Rayna, Teddy and Deacon go on GMA to talk about the situation, and Deacon says that Teddy did a great job raising Maddie.

After Rayna and Luke finish singing "Ball and Chain" at her show at LP Field, Luke proposes to her on stage and she accepts. Later that night Deacon visits her telling her not to marry Luke because he now knows how to love her. He also proposes to her.

=== Season 3 ===
Rayna must make a decision whom to marry – Luke or Deacon. She goes through old letters Deacon wrote to her, albums and starts playing their song, "Postcard from Mexico". While listening to the song she looks back at their relationship, which includes her going to his hotel room and finding him being passed out or being unable to find him anywhere. She also remembers a time that Luke was there for her. Rayna then goes to Deacon and tells him that she chooses Luke because they have a clean slate and that he is the safe choice. Deacon responds that he is not the right choice.

Looking for new artists to sign at Highway 65, she comes across a fellow country singer, Sadie Stone, who is looking for a new record deal. When Rayna hears that Jeff Fordham of Edgehill is talking to Sadie, she does, too. Rayna's manager Bucky later tells her that Sadie is leaning towards Edgehill so Rayna rushes to her before contracts are signed. Sadie says that Edgehill can make her as big as 'Rayna Jaymes' but Rayna says no, only she (Sadie) can make herself big. Rayna then explains to her that Jeff only wants to sign her so he can show her off to his board so they will see that he has a female artist on his roster, then forget about her. With Highway 65, she (Rayna)won't. At the beginning of her show Sadie announces that she signed with Rayna, leaving Jeff furious. In retaliation, Jeff calls someone saying that he is interested in signing a young sister act then waves to Teddy. He wants to sign Maddie and Daphne. Rayna becomes closer to Juliette when she is the first person Juliette tells about her pregnancy.

During her tour Rayna is also planning her wedding to Luke. Rayna and Luke go two months without really seeing each other and when they do have a few days off, Rayna uses that time to be interviewed by Rolling Stone. Luke is angry since they have barely seen each other. The Rolling Stone reporter then interviews her at home. As she, Luke, and the reporter walk around they hear loud music playing. They go find the noise and when they do, they walk in on Maddie and Luke's son, Colt, making out. Fearing that the reporter will write what he saw, Rayna goes to him and convinces him not to write about it, offering her story about Deacon instead. Rayna gets the most CMA nominations with six, including some for which she is up against Luke; 'Entertainer of the Year', 'Album' and 'Single'. When the CMA's finally come around, Rayna immediately wins the first award of the night for 'Single of the Year', beating Luke. During her speech, she thanks Deacon who co-wrote it with her. Luke is not pleased. Rayna beats out Luke again for 'Album of the Year'. So far, Luke has only won 'Male Vocalist' and then 'Musical Event' with Rayna. To blow off steam he drinks and his ego gets to him. He walks off to the restroom, and Rayna follows him to see what's wrong. He complains about her thanking Deacon, saying she came to the show with him, not Deacon, and he is the reason her album went gold because he proposed to her the day it was released. As the show closes, Rayna sweeps her nominations and wins 'Entertainer of the Year'. At home, Luke apologizes for his behavior. He blames it on his ego and drinking and assures her that she is the only reason her album went gold.

As her wedding day approaches, Rayna starts to feel unsure about going through it. The girls talk about going to boarding school when they hear from Luke that his kids do. Rayna disapproves of them talking about that with him, without her. She tells the girls they aren't going to boarding school. One of the reasons is because she feels that everything is changing and not for the better. On the day of the wedding, Rayna tells Luke she can't marry him and calls it off, leaving him furious. Later that day, Rayna goes to Deacon to tell him she loves him and always has, but she needs some time for herself.'

Jeff now only wants to sign Maddie so he can have a singer like Taylor Swift on his roster. He blackmails Teddy into signing his consent that Maddie be signed since only one parent's consent is necessary. Rayna is furious when she finds out but she is able to prevent it when she tells Jeff's boss about Layla overdosing at Jeff's house, among other things. In addition to Maddie not getting signed, Jeff gets fired and Edgehill folds. Deacon finds out he has liver cancer but doesn't want Rayna to know. He tells Scarlett he is supposed to take care of Rayna, not the other way around. He keeps his distance from her for a while until she asks him to sing with her to celebrate the tenth anniversary of her induction into the Grand Ole Opry. When they finish singing he runs off to avoid talking to her. He goes to his cabin at the lake but she follows him. Deacon finally tells her that he has cancer and she breaks down. After spending all day at the lake talking, they finally get back together. They go back to Rayna's house so they can tell the girls they are back together, and so Deacon can tell them he is sick.

With Deacon's sister, Beverly, being his only match as a donor, Rayna goes to Mississippi to ask her but Beverly refuses. Rayna and Beverly don't have a good history with each other because years ago Deacon chose to join Rayna's band instead of making it big with Beverly, and Beverly resents Rayna for that. Beverly eventually agrees to be his donor. As the surgery approaches, Deacon has nightmares about dying. Before he goes into the O.R. he asks Rayna to marry him right then and there. She tells him no, they will wait until after the operation so they can have a proper ceremony. They do, however, recite wedding vows to each other. Rayna assures him that he is going to be alright. While waiting for the surgery to be over, Dr. Rand tells Rayna something has gone wrong. The heart-monitor then appears on screen showing a flat-line, leaving viewers to wonder if it was Deacon or Beverly who flat-lined.

=== Season 4 ===
A month has past since the transplant. Deacon and Beverly made it through the surgery although Beverly had an aneurysm and is in a coma. Rayna, who just officially dropped Juliette from Highway 65, gets a call from her, crying and saying she needs help. Rayna flies out to Los Angeles to see her because she cares about her. When Rayna tries to talk to her after her set she doesn't have much luck. Juliette yells at her and says she is not having good luck with Highway 65. On her way back home in Nashville, Rayna hears the radio DJ's criticizing her about letting Juliette go and how she is not that good at running a label. In an effort to save her label Rayna tries to find a big-name artist to sign. She comes up with a rock star named Markus Keen who is looking for a new label but Bucky thinks it won't work because he is a rock artist. On a flight to New York she is conveniently seated right next to Markus. During the flight she smooth talks him about switching to country, convincing him that at her label he can be heard. Markus ends up signing with her. Scarlett makes the tough decision of taking Beverly off life support. At the funeral Deacon breaks down during the eulogy so Rayna takes over. After the funeral, Markus calls Rayna saying he is on his way to Nashville and ready to work. Rayna gets mad at Maddie when she finds out Juliette invited her to sing on stage with her in Atlanta and punishes her. She is having a tough time with Maddie and brings her and Daphne to the meeting with Markus. Markus gets Rayna to produce his album after he fires Avery for not "getting" his "vision", among other things. While working on the album he acts like an arrogant brat, as usual. He and Rayna don't see eye-to-eye so he storms off, saying this was a mistake. Markus eventually gets her version of his song now. Deacon decides to buy into a bar with one of his buddies, Frankie Grey, who was his AA sponsor. Rayna is unsure about it because he is a recovering alcoholic. They get into an argument over it but she eventually supports him. Deacon proposes to Rayna and she says yes.

When Rayna and Deacon's wedding day arrives, the paparazzi has discovered where the wedding is going to be held – at Rayna's late mother's country property, where she has many wonderful childhood memories with her mother and Tandy. Rayna's publicist finds a private barn where the wedding can be held out of the public eye. Maddie is concerned about her parents getting married because sometimes Deacon can be violent; for instance, when he pushed a paparazzi photographer out of the way and broke his camera in rage. Daphne is concerned about the marriage, too, because she's worried about being the outsider. Rayna assures both of the girls that there is nothing to worry about because they are a family and nothing is going to tear that apart, and Deacon loves them both more than anything. Tandy is openly opposed to the marriage and threatens to hunt Deacon down if he ever hurts her sister. The ceremony proceeds as ceremony, and Rayna and Deacon are now married.

Maddie runs away from home to live with Frankie's daughter Cash, and Cash is going to help her with her career. Cash tells Maddie about the recording contract at Edgehill she was offered that she didn't know about. Maddie feels that her mother is standing in her way and wants to be emancipated so she can take control of her career. Rayna doesn't want Maddie to be like her, when she was younger and left home for a career. She wants to shield her from being exploited, but she also fears she is losing her. At the hearing Deacon's violent, drunken past is exposed to the judge. The lawyer uses this as a tool to help get Maddie emancipated. Deacon realizes the only way the lawyer knew all of that is because Frankie told Cash, who then told the lawyer. Deacon then confronts Frankie outside of their bar. The two get into a brawl after Frankie sucker punches him. Just as Deacon bloodies Frankie's nose, everyone from inside comes out to, and Frankie accuses Deacon of trying to kill him. This causes the judge to decide to grant Maddie's emancipation. Cash wants Maddie to get away from Nashville so there will be no connections to Rayna, and Maddie signs with a shady label in New York. When an older record producer attempts to assault Maddie, Deacon bursts in and rescues her. Maddie reconciles with her family, and as the season comes to a close Rayna, Deacon, Maddie and Daphne are a happy family once more.

=== Season 5 ===
Rayna has her family back at last. The season opens with the family watching the news coverage of Juliette's plane crash. Rayna has some financial problems with the label hitting some bumps in the road. She agrees to play at a private event in Silicon Valley hosted by an app developer named Zach Wells (who is a fanboy of hers) as a way to bring in money. Zach informs Rayna that he is on his way to Nashville. He wants to "hack her cloud" and wants to go into business with her. She and Deacon are unsure of the proposal, but she needs the money. In return, Zach wants 20% of Highway 65. Luke has put Wheelin' Dealin' Records up for sale, and Zach wants Highway 65 to acquire it. Rayna gets inspired for her and Deacon to write their story for a concept album featuring the two of them.

Rayna also has a stalker. One day when she walks into work, someone watches her as they listen to her music. A few days later Rayna discovers a mysterious package with no stamp at her door. It contains a letter and rose petals. More mysterious letters show up and she and Bucky try to figure out who is behind them. The man who wrote the letters, Carl Hockney, shows up at Highway 65, which alarms her. Bucky escorts him out while she calls for security. She gets a restraining order against Hockney and increases security at her house. One day Hockney shows up at Daphne's school. He taunts the Jaymes/Claybourne household by going as far as he can while still obeying the restraining order. This drives them crazy, turning their lives upside down, and Deacon wants to confront him, but the police advise not to do that. They want him arrested but he hasn't done anything for which he can be arrested. He eventually violates the restraining order by surprising Rayna at work. He holes up in her office where they talk, and when she tries to get free he catches her and threatens her with a knife. After pleas from Rayna and the police he lets her go and is arrested. The police take her home, and as she is on the phone with Deacon to tell him what happened an oncoming car crashes into them, sending Rayna to the hospital.

Due to the crash, Rayna has a shattered pelvis and hip, and is in surgery for four hours. Lying in her hospital bed, Rayna sees her dead mother and talks to her. This worries Deacon because he knows people can experience that when they are on the brink of death, but the doctor tells him not to worry. Daphne's choir comes to the hospital to support her. While they sing for Rayna she crashes and is sent to the ICU. Her organs are failing, her condition worsens and her outcome isn't too promising. She can't hold on any longer, and dies with her family by her side. Following her death, Bucky announced that the CMT Awards (where Rayna was scheduled to perform) had planned a musical tribute by Faith Hill. Juliette convinces the organizers that she knew Rayna best and should sing instead, however, when she comes to perform "Sanctuary", she leaves the stage and allows Maddie to sing instead. Maddie breaks down halfway through the song and is then joined by Daphne and Deacon, with the trio receiving a standing ovation from the crowd.

Rayna's death causes tension within the family when Teddy and Tandy suggest that the girls should live with Teddy (as Daphne is biologically his and Deacon has proven to be an unstable parent). Tandy also states that Deacon is not fully equipped to run Highway 65. Eventually, Teddy realizes that Rayna would have wanted Maddie and Daphne to stay with Deacon. At a Highway 65 meeting, Deacon is furious when Zach states that they should release Deacon and Rayna's duet album (as Rayna had completed the majority of her studio recordings before her death) although he later comes to see that the album is the perfect way to end Rayna's career. Deacon goes into their home studio where he finds Bucky, Gunnar, Scarlett, Will, Avery, Juliette, Maddie and Daphne all singing along with Rayna's recording of the track "You're Mine" and he joins them, seeing it as their final song together.

=== Season 6 ===
Rayna appears briefly in the season finale in a flashback to her and Deacon's wedding night at Deacon's cabin. Rayna notes that she and Deacon are at her favorite place on the planet because she is with him. The two discuss their relationship with Deacon telling Rayna that he feels everything is too good to be true and after all the things he's done and all the drama they've seen, he finds it hard to believe that the two are together. Rayna tells him that yes, they've hurt each other and they have their past, but reassures him that once in everyone's life, someone gets into your bloodstream and it doesn't matter how much they fail each other, they must choose each other. She tells Deacon that she chooses him exactly the way he is and that she will love him forever.

== Departure ==
After CMT picked up Nashville in summer 2016, there were rumors that Britton would depart the series after ten episodes. In the ninth episode of season 5, Rayna dies onscreen following injuries from a car crash. Discussing her reason for leaving the show, Britton stated "various reasons, had been percolating for me. What was really important to me was that it felt like the right time." "There were a lot of different factors that played into it; it was a cumulative thing. I don't need to go into greater detail about what that was but, for me it felt like the timing was important and my No. 1 priority was the show and making sure that it was done in the right way."
