= Juliette Barnes =

Fictional character from the series Nashville

Juliette Barnes-Barkley
- Nashville character
- Hayden Panettiere as Juliette Barnes-Barkley
- Portrayed by: Hayden Panettiere
- First appearance: "Pilot" (October 10, 2012)
- Last appearance: "Beyond the Sunset" (July 26, 2018)
- Created by: Callie Khouri
In-universe information
- Occupation: Singer-songwriter, actress, housewife
- Father: Eddie Barnes † (father)
- Mother: Jolene Barnes † (mother)
- Spouse: Sean Butler (ex-husband); Avery Barkley (husband)
- Children: Cadence Barkley (b. 2015); Unborn second Barkley child (b. 2018)

Juliette Jolene Barnes-Barkley is a fictional character and one of the two leads in the ABC/CMT musical drama series Nashville. Juliette is portrayed by actress Hayden Panettiere since the pilot episode, which aired on October 10, 2012. Juliette was a teenage country sensation and is now making more mature music. She tries to take the throne, as Queen of Country music, from rival Rayna Jaymes. Panettiere received critical acclaim for her performance as Juliette, including nominations for two Golden Globe Award for Best Supporting Actress – Television Series Drama in 2013 and 2014, a Satellite Award for Best Actress – Television Series Drama in 2012 and a Critics' Choice Television Award for Best Supporting Actress in a Drama Series in 2016.

== Casting and creation ==
The casting of Hayden Panettiere as Juliette Barnes was announced on February 29, 2012. Juliette was characterized as an up-and-coming country-pop diva and rival of series co-lead Rayna Jaymes, a fading country star played by Connie Britton. Although best known as an actress, Panettiere had a brief music career, recording songs for several films between 2004 and 2007 and planning to release an album. Though she co-wrote and recorded some songs for it, it was never completed or released. She later explained: "I quit after about four or five years of recording, and I said this is not me. But I said that if I was ever going to do music again, I would do country music, and for this [Nashville] to come along and to get both of the things I love [acting and country music] combined in one show, it's a dream come true."

Panettiere has denied media reports that her character resembles Taylor Swift, (who was also born in 1989) and states that Juliette is instead based on herself—a young woman in the entertainment industry—and Carrie Underwood. She was attracted to the character because she was "so multidimensional" and because she wanted to "break away from her character in Heroes."

Panettiere has revealed that she was not the first choice to play the role, as the producers were not sure she would be able to render Juliette vulnerable enough to be likeable. After Panettiere was cast, the writers re-wrote Juliette, who was originally seen as a supporting character to Rayna James' series lead, to be a co-lead alongside her.

== Character profile ==
Juliette Barnes, originally from Alabama, was discovered singing at a country fair by her manager, Glenn Goodman at age 14, who believed he could turn her into one of America's biggest country stars. Juliette, being young, beautiful and ambitious, had no qualms about leaving her dysfunctional home life and her drug-addicted mother behind (Juliette's father died when she was four years old). Juliette emancipated herself at the age of 16 and moved to Nashville, Tennessee. She quickly rose to become Edgehill Republic Records' biggest star, a pop-country sensation, with legions of young teenage fans and sell-out tours. Despite Juliette's singing talent being questioned by several characters, including Rayna Jaymes, she shows not only raw talent but has also proves to be a capable songwriter and works with talented musicians such as Deacon Clayborne and Avery Barkley. Both Juliette and Rayna had bad parents and left home when they were 16 to become famous country music stars.

Juliette is initially played as a demanding, arrogant diva, but her hard exterior shields a world of pain that she rarely lets people see. She has no friends, no one she can turn to, and she has seen the worst of people growing up, which has left her unable to connect with people emotionally. As a result, she shows a desperate desire to be loved by anyone who shows her the slightest bit of affection, such as falling in love with her mother's drug counsellor. In season 6, Juliette is diagnosed with dissociation due to trauma in early childhood.

=== Season 1 ===
At the beginning of the series, Juliette is an emerging country music performer whose growing popularity positions her as a professional rival to established singer Rayna Jaymes. Their relationship is marked by mutual professional tension and personal rivalry. Publicly, Juliette maintains a polished pop-country image, while her private behavior is portrayed as ambitious and career-driven.

Despite a string of number ones and sell-out tours, Juliette struggles to be taken seriously, as her vocals are auto-tuned and her videos are cheesy and clichéd. She decides to work with Deacon Clayborne and when she writes with him, he is the first one to recognize her potential as a songwriter.

The rivalry between Juliette and Rayna comes to a head when Rayna is promoted from an opening act to co-touring with Juliette and their management suggest they write a song together. Rayna tells Juliette a few home truths about her talent and her diva-like behavior, which upsets Juliette. When Deacon shows Rayna the lyrics Juliette has written, Rayna begrudgingly admits she may have been wrong. They admit their mutual dislike for each other and finish a song together called "Wrong Song" that goes straight to number one. The two are forced to respect each other despite their mutual dislike.

In her personal life, Juliette is set up on a date by a famous football player for the Tennessee Titans named Sean Butler, as her management thinks it will be good press. Juliette finds him sweet, especially when he reveals his intentions to remain a virgin until marriage. She is scorned by Sean's family, especially his mother, who thinks Juliette is trash. Juliette seduces Sean, which leads to a rather hasty marriage. She realizes Sean is a genuinely good person and doesn't want to hurt him, so she agrees to an annulment.

Juliette's life is further complicated when her drug-addicted mother, Jolene, re-enters her life. She remembers losing her irresponsible mother to drugs, resulting in Juliette having to clean up after her and often being on the receiving end of her mother's drug fuelled violence. Despite this, she helps her mother again by paying for her rehab and eventually falls for her mother's drug counsellor Dante. He swiftly begins to take over Juliette's life, her finances and her career, but Juliette is so blindly in love with him, she ignores everyone. Dante flees with a sum of Juliette's money and tries to blackmail her out of $10 million with a sex tape he has of the two of them.

Juliette refuses to give into his demands and instead issues a statement confessing her role in the tape and stating that it was released without her permission, which garners respect. Jolene, finally deciding to help her daughter after years of neglect, murders Dante, destroys the tape and then kills herself with a drug overdose, devastating Juliette.

=== Season 2 ===
Juliette is introduced to Edgehill's new CEO, Jeff Fordham, and Layla Grant, who rose to fame after being the runner-up in a singing competition. Layla wants to take Juliette's place. Juliette complains that she is not country and makes fun of her when she says "y'all" because she is from Connecticut. Following the events of Rayna's wreck, she wants to cancel the remainder of the tour to spend more time with her daughters, which makes Juliette unhappy. She wants to move away from doing over-the-top numbers and refuses to play half-houses. Desperately wanting to keep playing to full arenas, she asks Layla to open up for her. Juliette is invited to join the Grand Ole Opry, which leaves her speechless.

Billionaire Charles "Charlie" Wentworth hires Juliette to sing at his anniversary party as a gift for his wife Olivia because she is a huge fan of hers. At the party, Juliette and Charlie sneak off to the house and sleep together. The two meet up again at the annual Bell Meade Polo tournament and end up sleeping together again only this time, unbeknownst to them, Olivia walks in on them. While on tour in Houston, Juliette decides that she no longer wants to suck up to a powerful DJ to get good reviews and airplay, which leads to critics leaving the show before her set and bad reviews. Charlie, who owns several radio stations, gets the DJ fired when he hears of this but has him rehired when Juliette regrets what Charlie did. Still in Houston, Juliette gets a surprise visit from Olivia, who hits on her. It is revealed that Charlie and Olivia wanted her to be a part of their threesome. After this, Charlie divorces Olivia.

Juliette begins to feel threatened by Layla when she steals her spotlight and gets distracted. When Layla goes over her set time, making Juliette's set and the show run late, she flips Layla and Will's sets at the next show. Just as Layla is supposed to go on stage to sing with Will, Juliette barges in, takes the mic and sings with him instead. In retaliation, Layla calls the press to reveal that Juliette is the cause of the Wentworths' divorce. At the Music City Festival, the press hound Juliette. She tells Glenn to find the person who leaked to the press but soon suspects Layla. Jeff goes to Layla and tells her that if she had anything to do with it, she will be dropped from the label. When Juliette arrives at the next tour stop, she is greeted by angry picketers who harass her and call her names. Her reputation takes another blow when someone edits a video of her so that it sounds like she said "there is no God". She turns to Layla for help as a way to clear her name.

As a result of this, venues start to drop her, leaving Jeff furious, so he makes her apologize for her comment or says that she will be dropped. Avery tries to cheer her up and they write a song together. The two begin dating. Juliette is told to make an apology at her Grand Ole Opry ceremony, but she dislikes what is written for her to say, ignores the teleprompter and begins singing "Don't Put Dirt on My Grave Just Yet". Once again this makes Jeff furious and he drops her from the label. Juliette hides at Avery's. Howie D, a high-powered, hit-making record producer, hears the new tweaked version of the song and wants to work with Juliette. She flies to Los Angeles to meet with him and record it. Glenn is feeling sidelined, so he tells Juliette that he is resigning as her manager and is heading back to Nashville. Not feeling what Howie D has in store for her, she tells Glenn that she does not want to move away from being a country music singer and is unable to continue without him. Juliette runs into Jeff at a restaurant and he offers her a new record deal but she turns him down. She also bumps Will and Layla from her tour.

As a way to resurrect her career, Juliette asks Rayna to sign her to Highway 65 Records, Rayna's newly founded record label. Feeling upstaged by newer talent, she sabotages the label party by going on stage to announce that she is now with the label. Juliette asks Charlie for a favor when she faces more empty seats on her tour, but he wants to get back together with her, and Avery tells him to go away. Rayna tells Juliette that she wants Scarlett to open for her on tour. After Scarlett has a meltdown on stage, Avery spends time with her, making Juliette jealous. Avery assures her that she is the one that he loves. At the BMI party, feeling wasted, Juliette runs into Jeff and they end up having sex. Gunnar sees them leaving the screening room together.

Gunnar tries to hide the secret from Avery but tells Zoey. Jeff blackmails Juliette into signing with him by threatening to tell Avery what happened between them. Juliette tells Rayna that it was a mistake signing with her and wants out of her contract, but Rayna tells her that there is too much at stake. She later reveals to Rayna that she mistakenly slept with Jeff. With Avery sensing that there is something going on with Gunnar and Zoey, they confess Juliette's secret to him. He tells Juliette that he wants to break up with her, and although she begs him to stay, he leaves anyway.

=== Season 3 ===
Juliette has a hard time getting over Avery and these emotions show through when she auditions to play Patsy Cline in a movie. Her emotions work in her favor, and Juliette ends up getting the role. When Juliette keeps getting sick, Glenn has a doctor come over to check on her. As he is leaving, the doctor tells her that she is pregnant. Juliette schedules an abortion, but finds out that she's further along and realizes the baby is not Jeff's. She keeps the baby, resulting in her being unable to get through rehearsals due to morning sickness. This makes Glenn and Emily suspicious, and Juliette walks in on them searching her house. Angry that they believe she is on drugs, she makes them leave without telling them the truth. She become friends with her movie co-star, Noah West. She eventually turns to Rayna for help. She finally tells Glenn and Emily that she wants to give the baby up for adoption discreetly, believing that this will keep her out of the public eye and that she can attribute the weight gain to preparing for the role of Patsy Cline. Avery gets arrested after getting drunk and trespassing. Juliette bails him out and, when Avery tells her that he wishes he had never met her, she decides to keep the baby and raise it on her own.

Emily tries to convince Juliette to tell Avery, and Juliette finally sends Avery a text. While she is on set filming, Avery shows up and makes a scene when Juliette refuses to see him, but Glenn gets him to leave. When Juliette becomes worried that shooting a love scene will reveal her pregnancy, Noah reveals that he overheard Avery and helps her to cover up the secret. Noah later shows up at her show and says that he enjoys spending time with her. While she is performing, Juliette becomes short of breath and leaves the stage, where Noah catches her as she collapses.

Juliette is rushed to the hospital and the doctor tells her that she must cancel the tour immediately. Avery shows up at the hospital, but leaves when Noah comes in. Juliette tracks him down and tells him that if he wants to be the baby's father, he will need to let her be a part of his life as well. Avery tells Juliette that he will be the baby's father on his terms. Juliette later reveals her pregnancy to the media to explain why she is cancelling her tour, and publicly admits that Avery is the father. Around the one-year anniversary of her mother's death, Juliette has flashbacks of her childhood. At the CMAs Juliette meets Avery's parents; his mom adores her but his father does not. When walking back to her seat, she overhears his father saying that he does not think that she and Avery will make good parents and brings up her past. Avery vows that they will not be like their parents. Juliette tells him that they are having a girl. Weeks after the CMAs, Juliette asks Avery to move in with her after the baby is born for a short time. They are later married by a judge. After canceling her baby shower, Juliette's waters break while arguing with Rayna. She is rushed to the hospital where she gives birth to her baby girl, Cadence. After this, Juliette is more focused on her career than the baby and neglects her. Emily is concerned and informs Avery. They call in Juliette's doctor who thinks she is suffering from postpartum depression but she denies it.

Worrying about not having a career after having a baby, she rushes to make a new album, and makes unauthorized roof top performances all across the country. Rayna is unhappy with it since the label is getting fined and she also wants Juliette to take some time off before making a new record. After getting into an argument with Rayna, Bucky and Glenn, Juliette leaves Highway 65 and fires Glenn. She then asks Jeff if he can be her new manager and signs with Luke Wheeler's Wheelin' Dealin' Records. While Avery complains to Juliette about not spending time with baby, she throws a snow globe at them but barely misses hitting them. Avery becomes tired of Juliette's behavior and leaves town with Cadence.

=== Season 4 ===
A month has passed and Juliette is on top of the world, because her new movie is a hit and her new album is coming out soon. Juliette has not seen or talked to Avery and Cadence in a month, and ignores Avery when he texts her. While out in Los Angeles touring with Luke and promoting her movie, she breaks down and calls Rayna for help. Rayna, who just officially dropped Juliette from Highway 65, flies out to Los Angeles to see her, but Juliette only yells at her and says that she is having no luck with Highway 65. Juliette's bitterness towards Layla continues when she tells her that she will be Jeff's number one client and that Jeff does not love her. Juliette goes back to Nashville and reconnects with Avery and Cadence. They go to her pre-album party but it turns out this was just for publicity. Without informing Avery, Juliette leaves town and leaves her phone at home. On her jet, Jeff gives her a new phone, confirming that no one has the number to it. Once away from Nashville, she parties, drinks, and has a doctor prescribe her medication, including uppers, downers, and hypnotics. With Juliette being absent, Avery needs help taking care of Cadence, so he gets Emily (who is still on Juliette's payroll) to help babysit her. One afternoon when Avery relieves Emily, the paparazzi takes pictures of the three of them together. The tabloids make up headlines, insinuating that Avery is cheating. Juliette believes this and calls Emily in a fit of anger, calling her a "gold digging backstabbing whore."

Avery desperately calls Juliette when Cadence is rushed to the hospital with a 104° temperature, but one of her assistants answers. Juliette who is strung out on alcohol and medication and tells the assistant to hang up, without learning that the baby is in hospital. Maddie goes with Luke to Atlanta for his show and to see Juliette perform. Juliette and Maddie spend time together, and she invites her to sing a song with her on stage. Luke is not pleased with this because she knows that Rayna will not be happy about it when she finds out. Later, Juliette cannot understand why she thought that something was going on between Avery and Emily. She calls to apologize to Emily, and on her way back home to Nashville she finds out that Cadence went to the hospital. Before she has a chance to get on the plane she runs into Avery. He is tired of her behavior and informs her that he wants a divorce and full custody of Cadence. Juliette agrees but is miserable. When she walks out of her hotel she is in a haze and attacks a fan. Jeff says that he can spin the attack on the fan to something more favorable in the press. They make the fan say that she had been stalking Juliette and finally went too far. Juliette mixes pills with alcohol again, texts Avery that she is sorry and goes to the hotel roof to kill herself. Jeff sees her stumbling on the rooftop of the building and rushes to her. As she is about to fall, Jeff saves her but in the momentum of pushing her back to safety, he falls off the ledge and dies. The next morning she wakes up to the police knocking on her door to tell her about what happened to Jeff and to ask questions. She has no memories of the night before. As she is leaving the hotel, reporters ask how she is feeling and she tells them that her manager just committed suicide. Colt (Luke's son) tells his father that he saw Juliette on the ledge of the roof and Jeff falling while saving her. Luke tells Juliette this but she tells him that she was in her room. Before Juliette goes on stage in Nashville, she remembers what happened to Jeff, and goes back to her dressing room. Juliette admits to Luke that she was drunk, going to kill herself and that Jeff died while saving her. That night Juliette enters rehab.

Avery is told what to say about Juliette's absence, and not to mention she is in rehab/treatment at Rayna and Deacon's wedding. At the reception, Colt confesses to Layla what happened to Jeff. In revenge, Layla asks Glenn to be her manager, and wants Avery to be her producer. While in rehab, Juliette signs the divorce papers. She is eventually released and is able to go back home to Nashville. She starts to change and become a better person. When she arrives home, she receives a lucrative offer to be in a Steven Spielberg movie, but accepting means that she will have to be in Prague for two weeks of filming. She accepts but quits during the press conference so that she can spend more time with Cadence. Initially, Avery limits the time that Juliette can spend with her because he does not quite trust her yet. When Layla finds out that Juliette is back in town, she asks Avery to be her musical director just as she is about to hit the road opening up for Luke. Juliette gets jealous when she sees them rehearsing together, and doesn't want Avery and Cadence to be on the road with Layla. To keep an eye on things, Juliette asks Luke if she can replace his friend Riff. Avery and Layla get closer while working on her album. One night, Avery lets Juliette keep Cadence for the night so that he can spend the night with Layla. The next morning, Juliette finds out that she was nominated for an Oscar for her performance in Shenandoah Girl and that Avery spent the night with Layla. Juliette confesses to Layla the truth about the night Jeff died while saving her, but Layla says that nothing has changed between them. At the premiere for Shenandoah Girl, she reunites with her co-star Noah West and the two end up having a brief fling. When the Oscars roll around, Juliette is tired of going to all the pre-parties, and wants to see Cadence. Juliette tells Glenn the truth about Jeff's death. Layla leaks the information and Jeff's sister sues Juliette for wrongful death. Juliette and Glenn work out that Layla was the one who leaked it. Layla tries to stop Avery from seeing Juliette on Oscar night, but he does not want to break any plans. Layla calls Jeff's sister and tells her to call Colt, because he saw everything. She then tells Avery that Jeff's sister has an eyewitness. Jeff's sister asks for three million dollars to back down. Juliette makes her lawyers pay it, confesses everything to the press, and skips the Oscars. Avery confronts Layla about lying, and realizing the extent of her manipulation, dumps her and calls her crazy. Avery waits for Juliette at the airport but is told that Juliette's plane sent out a distress signal 90 miles away from Nashville and is missing.

=== Season 5 ===
Juliette's plane crashes and she is the only survivor. Later, she experiences severe survivor's guilt and must deal with her injuries from the accident which have left her unable to walk. After an initial stint in the hospital, Avery is permitted to take her home in a wheelchair where Juliette quickly becomes frustrated at her inability to care for Cadence and gets angry at her physiotherapist for not regaining the use of her legs. She becomes determined to track down the woman who saved her life and eventually finds her singing in the choir at a nearby church. Hallie Jordan (Rhiannon Giddens) is at first confused by Juliette, who tries to show her gratitude through expensive gifts, but the two bond over their faith. When Luke sells Wheelin' Dealin' Records to Rayna, Juliette is signed to Highway 65. Juliette becomes more devoted to God following the crash and after moving from the chair to crutches, suggests the idea of recording a gospel album with the church's choir to Rayna, who agrees. When she broaches the idea with the choir, there is some initial friction but Juliette eventually wins them over. Juliette and Avery go to the hospital where she explains to the doctor that her legs have been in a lot of pain and insists on a scan. While waiting for the results, Juliette visits Rayna who has been rushed into hospital following a car crash. Rayna tells Juliette how proud she is and remarks on how much she has changed since the two of them first met. Juliette's scan results report that there is no cause for concern, but the meeting with the doctor is interrupted when they find out Rayna has entered a critical condition and is now in the ICU. Juliette and Avery rush to Rayna's side, with Juliette abandoning her crutches and running. She tells Rayna that she just wanted her to be proud of her. They stay for a while and provide support to Deacon and the girls but return home before Rayna passes away. Juliette always saw Rayna as a mother figure, even though they had their differences and were rivals in the past. Glenn ensures that Juliette is part of the tribute to Rayna at the CMT Awards, but when the time comes to perform she is uncomfortable with it and asks Maddie to take her place. Juliette attempts to regain her career and fame but radio only wants to work with Maddie. Her new Christian album is released and flops, so she decides to make another pop-country hit album. Juliette eventually writes with a songwriter who has a song she loves, but wants her to give it to Maddie. She says she will, but steals the song, which leads to criticism from country-music, family, and fans. Juliette drops out of the American Music Award she is nominated for and tells the world what she did. She ponders why she has a darkness inside her and realizes she is doomed to make the same mistakes again and again.

=== Season 6 ===
Juliette has been planning her new album launch which will kick off with a performance. She has been given a second chance at Highway 65 but audience members start holding up signs and booing her at her kickoff. She explains that if they really knew her, they would not like her and walks off stage. During a trip away with Avery, she runs into Darius, who says he is someone on her journey. Juliette is awake at 2 a.m., due to chronic insomnia, and finds a commercial of Darius talking about giving up addictions. Glenn tells Juliette that Darius tried to contact her at 2 a.m. She accuses Darius of stalking her, but he refutes that it was fate; he recognizes the pain in her and wants to help her change her life. Juliette meets Darius, who says he does not run a cult, but a way to help the mind. She goes on radio and announces that she struggles with depression and is cancelling her tour/album. Juliette eventually joins Darius' cult, which makes her stop wanting to sing. Darius pushes Juliette to grow and be involved in humanity projects. Everyone in Juliette's life tries to tell her they are worried about her and see that she is changing, but she refuses to believe them. She says that she wants to be a new person. It is eventually revealed that Jolene used Juliette (around the age of 9) to sell her as a child prostitute. This is the potential reason behind Juliette's dissociation because she does not remember the incident until Darius prompts her memory. Her disengagement from the event results in her pushing away Avery. Darius tells Juliette that the next step in the cult is to outreach in Bolivia, so Juliette ditches her family. Avery tries to get her to return but she refuses and says that she is not herself anymore. She suggests that Cadence could come to Bolivia but Avery refuses. Avery eventually decides that his relationship with Juliette is over. She eventually returns home when she realizes what the cult is, motivated by a new pregnancy. She ends up quitting the music business and moves to a farm to raise Cadence, but promises Avery she is not running away. She hides the pregnancy from him for a few weeks because she wants him to want to be with her for the rest of their lives, not just for their new baby. Eventually, Juliette, now visibly pregnant, is playing with Cadence, and Avery returns to be with them, after deciding that he wants to be with Juliette for the rest of their lives.

== Reception ==
=== Reviews ===
Panettiere has received critical acclaim for her role as Juliette. Sarah Hughes of The Guardian said that she "not only showcases a fine pair of lungs and a nice way with a one liner, she pulls off the rarer trick of making you sympathise with her character even when she's doing wrong." Reviewing each episode of the series for The A.V. Club, Gwen Ihnat has come to regard Juliette as the series' lead character, and has consistently praised Panettiere for her performances, particularly for playing Juliette as "domineering, manipulative, in denial, and finally, achingly vulnerable... [rising] from a caricature to become one of the most interesting parts of the show." She later noted that "every single week, Hayden Panettiere is the greatest thing about this show."

Deena Shanker of Salon has said that Panettiere's portrayal of Juliette has evolved to the point where she is a "feminist role model". Erin Carlson of The Hollywood Reporter has quipped that Panettiere should win the Michael Emerson prize for "Humanizing Terrible Characters on Network TV" after accomplishing what she felt the cast of Girls had not: rendering a "bitchy" character to be likeable and the series' "best", giving her "purpose, drive, grit and backbone".

=== Awards ===
Panettiere has been nominated for numerous awards for her role as Juliette: for a Golden Globe Award for Best Supporting Actress – Television Series Drama in 2013 and 2014, a Satellite Award for Best Actress – Television Series Drama in 2012, a Teen Choice Award for Television Actress: Drama in 2013 and 2015, a Prism Award for Female Performance in a Drama Series Multi-Episode Storyline in 2014, and a Critics' Choice Television Award for Best Supporting Actress in a Drama Series in 2016.
