= The Princess Switch (film series) =

Romance film series

- Official film series logo
- Based on: Characters created by Robin Bernheim & Megan Metzger
- Production company: Netflix Original Films
- Distributed by: Netflix
- Country: United States
- Language: English

The Princess Switch film series consists of American Christmas romantic-comedies, including three feature films. Starring Vanessa Hudgens in multiple roles, alongside Sam Palladio and Nick Sagar, the plot is based loosely on the 1881 novel The Prince and the Pauper by Mark Twain. Hudgens stars as Stacy De Novo and Lady Margaret Delacourt, Duchess of Montenero, two strangers who discover that they look exactly alike and decide to trade places and roles for Christmas. The films show their experiences while doing so, while Hudgens additionally portrays Lady Fiona Pembroke in the sequels.

The series is produced by Netflix and released exclusively through its streaming services as Netflix Original Films. The first film, released in 2018 was received with positive critical reception. Following its success, Netflix quickly began developing sequels. The second was released in 2020, to mixed critical reception. The third film The Princess Switch 3: Romancing the Star, was released November 2021, again to mixed critical reception.

== Films ==
Film	U.S. release date	Director	Screenwriter(s)	Producers
The Princess Switch	November 16, 2018	Mike Rohl	Robin Bernheim & Megan Metzger	Amy Krell, Brad Krevoy and Linda L. Miller
The Princess Switch: Switched Again	November 19, 2020	Mike Rohl	Robin Bernheim Burger & Megan Metzger	Steven R. McGlothen, Vanessa Hudgens and Brad Krevoy
The Princess Switch 3: Romancing the Star	November 18, 2021	Mike Rohl	Robin Bernheim Burger	Vanessa Hudgens and Brad Krevoy

=== The Princess Switch (2018) ===
Stacy DeNovo, a talented young baker, with a type-A personality with a habit of planning and creating schedules, takes a spontaneous trip during Christmas time at the suggestion of her sous-chef and best friend, named Kevin. Upon arriving in Belgravia, Stacy enjoys the holiday festivities. While preparing for the local Royal Christmas Baking Contest, she meets her identical doppelgänger who has a personal request. Lady Margaret Delacourt, who serves as Duchess of Montenaro, a free-willed and spirited woman with obligations to her position of power, asks that the pair switch places for the event so that she can enjoy her last chance at normalcy before accepting her betrothal to the Crown Prince of Belgravia. When the women swap roles, they soon discover that their interests lie with each other's respective men.

=== The Princess Switch: Switched Again (2020) ===
Following unexpected events, Lady Margaret Delacourt inherits the throne to the kingdom of Montenaro. As she struggles with her new responsibilities and duties as Queen, a series of cumbersome events convince her that she needs help from her look-alike friend Stacy DeNovo. Longing to spend time with Kevin who she met while previously living as Stacy, she asks Stacy to once again switch places with her. As the women trade positions and assume their roles in impersonating each other, Lady Margaret's party-life cousin named Lady Fiona Pembroke, who also looks remarkably like the two other women, comes to visit Montenaro for the Christmas season. The three women are involved in a comedic series of events, while trying to gain control of their respective love lives.

=== The Princess Switch 3: Romancing the Star (2021) ===
Once again during Christmas preparations, a priceless heirloom of the kingdom of Montenaro is stolen. Queen Margaret and Princess Stacy work together, with the help of Fiona and her ex-boyfriend, to retrieve the relic. While each of the women trade places, events of adventure and romance ensue.

== Main cast and characters ==
List indicators

This section includes characters who will appear or have appeared in the franchise in main roles.

- An empty grey cell indicates the character was not in the film, or that the character's official presence has not yet been confirmed.
- ^{C} indicates a cameo role.
- ^{Y} indicates a younger version of the character.

Character	Films		
Character	The Princess Switch	The Princess Switch: Switched Again	The Princess Switch 3: Romancing the Star
Stacy De Novo-Wyndham Princess of Belgravia	Vanessa Hudgens	Vanessa Hudgens	Vanessa Hudgens
Lady Margaret Katherine Claire Delacourt former-Duchess of Montenaro Queen of Montenaro	Vanessa Hudgens	Vanessa Hudgens	Vanessa Hudgens
Lady Fiona Pembroke		Vanessa Hudgens	Vanessa Hudgens
Prince Edward Wyndham	Sam Palladio	Sam Palladio	Sam Palladio
Kevin Richards	Nick Sagar	Nick Sagar	Nick Sagar

== Additional production and crew details ==
Film	Crew/Detail					
Film	Composer(s)	Cinematographer(s)	Editor	Production companies	Distributing company	Running time
The Princess Switch	Terry Frewer	Viorel Sergovici & Lulu de Hillerin	Charles Norris	Netflix Original Films, Motion Picture Corporation of America	Netflix	102 minutes
The Princess Switch: Switched Again	Alan Lazar	Fernando Argüelles Fernandez	Lara Mazur	Netflix Original Films, MPCA, Brad Krevoy Television	Netflix	98 minutes
The Princess Switch 3: Romancing the Star	Jina Hyojin An & Shirley Song	Fernando Argüelles Fernandez	Lee Haxall	Netflix Original Films, MPCA, Brad Krevoy Television	Netflix	106 minutes

== Critical reception ==
Film	Rotten Tomatoes	Metacritic
The Princess Switch	71% (14 reviews)	—N/a(0 reviews)
The Princess Switch: Switched Again	58% (24 reviews)	—N/a(2 reviews)
The Princess Switch 3: Romancing the Star	50% (14 Reviews)	—N/a
