= The Princess Switch: Switched Again =

American Christmas romantic comedy film

- Official release poster
- Directed by: Mike Rohl
- Written by: Robin Bernheim Burger; Megan Metzger
- Produced by: Steven R. McGlothen; Vanessa Hudgens; Brad Krevoy
- Starring: Vanessa Hudgens; Sam Palladio; Nick Sagar
- Cinematography: Fernando Argüelles Fernandez
- Edited by: Lara Mazur
- Music by: Alan Lazar
- Production companies: MPCA; Brad Krevoy Television
- Distributed by: Netflix
- Release date: November 19, 2020
- Running time: 98 minutes
- Country: United States
- Language: English

The Princess Switch: Switched Again is a 2020 American Christmas romantic comedy film directed by Mike Rohl. As the second installment in The Princess Switch trilogy, it stars Vanessa Hudgens, Sam Palladio, Suanne Braun, and Nick Sagar.

The plot follows Margaret Delacourt, the Duchess of Montenaro, who suddenly inherits the throne to her home country of Montenaro. As her Christmas coronation approaches, she and Stacy switch places once again so Margaret can fix her relationship with Stacy's friend Kevin. Unbeknownst to both women, a third look-alike, Margaret's immature and greedy cousin Lady Fiona, disguises herself as Margaret in a scheme to steal the throne.

The film is produced by Brad Krevoy and was released on Netflix on November 19, 2020, and received mixed reviews from critics. The third film of the series is titled The Princess Switch 3: Romancing the Star.

== Plot ==
Two years after the end of the first film, Stacy is now the Princess of Belgravia, while Margaret is preparing to ascend to the throne of Montenaro, following the death of the king and the decision of his son Howard to abdicate. Nervous about taking on the responsibilities of ruling a nation, Margaret has ended her relationship with Kevin, who is now running the bakery on his own with Olivia in Chicago.

Stacy makes a surprise visit to Chicago on her way to the coronation and finds Kevin miserable since the breakup. When Olivia reveals she never mailed in the RSVP to the coronation, Stacy persuades him to reconsider and travel with her and Prince Edward. This is despite the couple having their own relationship problems as the prince feels increasingly neglected while she focuses on her duties as Princess.

Upon arriving, Kevin reunites with Margaret and helps her, Prince Edward, Stacy, and Olivia decorate her palace for Christmas. Margaret also feels depressed about how things ended with her and Kevin. At an evening event, they dance, only to be interrupted by Lady Fiona Pembroke, Margaret's cousin.

Unbeknownst to anyone, Fiona has spent nearly all of her family's small fortune, so has resorted to using her servants Reggie and Mindy to rob the guests at the party. Back at the decrepit Pembroke estate, Fiona suddenly has an idea: to assume Margaret's identity, get crowned as queen, and loot the royal treasury, setting her up for life. Reggie and Mindy are enthusiastic and help Fiona dye her hair and copy Margaret's makeup while studying the queen's upcoming schedule.

Back at the palace, Margaret admits that she has been too busy with royal affairs to spend time with Kevin. Complicating matters further is Count Antonio Rossi, her chief of staff. He woos her and plants seeds of doubt in Kevin's mind that he could ever be a good match for a future queen.

Stacy decides the only way to fix everything is for her and Margaret to switch identities again so she and Kevin can have the afternoon to themselves while Stacy takes care of Margaret's schedule. The switch takes place, with Olivia staying behind to distract Edward while Margaret and Kevin go to a local Christmas park. There, he expresses his doubts about being her equal, but she convinces him that such concerns are irrelevant as long as they love each other.

Reggie and Mindy abduct Stacy, thinking she is Margaret, locking her up in Pembroke Manor. Fiona steps in just as Margaret returns. Realizing that the woman she is speaking to is not Stacy, Margaret tells Prince Edward the truth. They then rescue Stacy from Reggie and Mindy, who are arrested and reveal Fiona's plan.

Meanwhile, Antonio deduces the truth on his own as Fiona forgot to cover up a tattoo on her finger. He tells her that he will move up the coronation and help her escape the country if she agrees to divide the treasury with him, as he also needs money.

Just as the coronation is about to take place, Margaret and Stacy arrive and expose Fiona and Antonio. The latter is arrested while the former admits her deception. Fiona reveals that Kevin is on his way to the airport with Olivia after she told him she did not want to be with him anymore.

They stop Kevin just as he is about to board a plane, and he and Margaret get married on the spot officiated by a nearby priest. Stacy and Edward reaffirm their love for each other as she promises to make more time for them, and he promises not to smother her with attention. Margaret is crowned Queen of Montenaro with Stacy, Edward, Olivia, and Fiona (escorted by police) cheering her on.

== Cast ==
- Vanessa Hudgens as
  - Stacy Juliette DeNovo Wyndham, Princess of Belgravia and Edward's wife
  - Margaret Katherine Claire Delacourt, Queen of Montenaro, Kevin's eventual wife and Olivia's eventual stepmother
  - Lady Fiona Clara Karen Pembroke, Margaret's cousin and Lord Percival and Lady Bianca Pembroke's daughter
- Sam Palladio as Edward Wyndham, Prince of Belgravia and Stacy's husband
- Nick Sagar as Kevin Richards, Stacy's best friend, Margaret's future husband, and future Prince Consort of Montenaro
- Mark Fleischmann as Frank De Luca, Prince Edward's driver
- Suanne Braun as Mrs. Donatelli, Duchess Margret's personal assistant
- Ricky Norwood as Reggie, Fiona's “minion”
- Florence Hall as Mindy, Fiona's “minion”
- Lachlan Nieboer as Count Antonio Rossi
- Mia Lloyd as Olivia Richards, Kevin's daughter, Stacy's goddaughter, and Margaret's eventual stepdaughter
- Robin Soans as Kindly Old Man

=== Cameo appearances ===
- Rose McIver as Queen Amber Moore Charlton of Aldovia from A Christmas Prince franchise
- Ben Lamb as King Richard Charlton of Aldovia from A Christmas Prince franchise

== Reception ==
On review aggregator Rotten Tomatoes, the film holds an approval rating of 56% based on 25 reviews, with an average rating of 6/10.

For Variety Dennis Harvey opines, "'Switched Again' isn't really about suspense, romantic troubles or even identity swapping. Instead, what it's selling is Yuletide." Terming the look of the film as a 'high-caloric treat', Harvey praised the production designer Pat Campbell, cinematographer Fernando Arguelles Fernandez, and the costumes by Johnetta Boone and Francisco Rodriguez-Weil. Harvey feels that the [switching] story is weak in certain places but the Christmas decorations will, "satisfy viewers’ itch for confectionary-looking Christmas fluff".

Helen T. Verongos of The New York Times found the movie to be an "appealing" Christmas film, saying that it was "syrupy, and no, beyond its central gimmick, there is little substance to be found. But the same could be said for many a beloved romance film or holiday movie".

Alex Abad-Santos of Vox was called it "a perfectly harmless way to burn 90 minutes, during which you won't worry about the awful things happening in real life. It's inoffensively fine — the conflict is never too high-stakes, and the happy ending is happy enough." Sarah El-Mahmoud of Cinemablend.com praised the film's atmosphere, but ultimately described it as "safe" and "generic".

== Sequel ==
In November 2020, Netflix confirmed that a third film in the series, The Princess Switch 3: Romancing the Star, had been ordered. The film premiered on Netflix on November 18, 2021.

== See also ==
- List of Christmas films
