= A Castle for Christmas =

- Official release poster
- Directed by: Mary Lambert
- Written by: Ally Carter; Kim Beyer-Johnson
- Produced by: Brad Krevoy
- Starring: Brooke Shields; Cary Elwes; Lee Ross; Andi Osho
- Cinematography: Michael Coulter
- Edited by: Suzy Elmiger
- Music by: Jeff Rona
- Production companies: Motion Picture Corporation of America; Brad Krevoy Productions
- Distributed by: Netflix
- Release date: November 26, 2021
- Running time: 98 minutes
- Country: United States
- Language: English

A Castle for Christmas is a 2021 American Christmas romantic comedy film directed by Mary Lambert, and starring Brooke Shields and Cary Elwes.

Bestselling author Sophie Brown journeys to Scotland, both to avoid outrage towards her latest book and to find inspiration to write her next one, but she unexpectedly falls in love with a castle – unexpectedly connecting with its curmudgeonly duke owner.

The film was released on November 26, 2021, by Netflix.

== Plot ==
Best-selling American author Sophie Brown travels to Scotland to escape the backlash from her last book, as fans were upset she killed off the male lead as she recently divorced. It was compounded by a very angry interview on the Drew Barrymore Show.

Visiting her father's ancestral village Dunbar, Sophie is warmly welcomed. People there love her books, even the last one. Shown the nearby castle, Dun Dunbar, where her grandfather had worked as a groundskeeper by a man she had first seen in the village, he abruptly turns her out when Sophie explores a section of the house he had warned was private.

Back in the B&B, the local knitting club befriends Sophie. All fans of her books, they get her to join. Chatting about their personal details, Sophie tells them about her daughter Lexie and mentions her recent divorce. She talks about her dad Callum McGuinty, whose father had worked at the castle, which one of them had actually known.

Discovering the castle is for sale, Sophie meets the Duke who owns it, Myles Dunbar. Both are appalled to see they had met there the previous day. Sophie feels she has fallen in love with Dun Dunbar, but must face off with the ill-tempered Myles. Initially refusing to sell, he is warned he has no choice. Myles approaches Sophie at the pub and proposes a deal: 90 day escrow, non-refundable deposit and they both live there simultaneously for the three months.

Sophie is given a new tour of the castle, focusing on its problems: no electricity in some rooms, old wiring, leaky roof, half of the fireplaces are inoperable, no heat upstairs, iffy plumbing, wifi and cell service intermittent. Myles gives her a room that is falling to pieces. Sophie shows him a door jamb with her last name carved into it, which her father had done as a child when trespassing, resulting in her grandfather getting sacked and their moving to the US.

The next day, Sophie continues bonding with the locals. As her dad was a barber, she does everyone in the knitting club's hair. The group then helps spruce up her room in the castle. They tell Sophie that, as their landlord, Myles is working to pay off the farmland debt. So, they all will be able to continue living in their homes, although he would still be homeless.

Lexi later tells Sophie she cannot come for Christmas, as her dad is remarrying then. Myles overhears, telling her he is a fool. He then divulges his wife left him for someone with a more prestigious title. Myles takes Sophie to the Dun Glen Holy Wishing Well. He mentions the first duke and duchess had held a Christmas party for years for the village, inspiring Sophie to want to do the same.

They later enjoy themselves at the pub. Back at the castle, they choose to ignore their definite chemistry. The next day, Sophie helps Thomas lead a tour through the house as she is recognized, still has writer's block and just spoke with her impatient editor Claire. It is well-received by the visitors.

Following Sophie down to the knitting group's meeting, Myles confronts her. Complaining she is everywhere, she reiterates that she is not going anywhere, so he stomps off. Back at the castle, as they need a tree, they get one in the woods together. The knitting club then helps decorate and sing carols.

That evening, Sophie is trying on a gown from one of the closets for the upcoming party. Before she can finish getting it on, the dog Hamish leads her to Myles' door. They cannot resist each other, kiss passionately and spend the night together. In the morning, Christmas eve, Myles blows up when she asks him to continue living there with her. Hurt, Sophie declares that he wins, as staying would only remind her of him.

Sophie wheels her suitcase into town, but Eamon's taxi 'breaks down', so she gets a room in the B&B but refuses to go to the party. Myles appears, apologizes and confesses he loves her. Going to their Christmas party, Lexi has come, thanks to Myles. In the final scene, Sophie McGuinty is back on the talk show, promoting her new best-seller.

== Cast ==
- Brooke Shields as Sophie Brown (née McGuinty)
- Cary Elwes as Myles, 12th Duke of Dunbar
- Vanessa Grasse as Lexi Brown
- Desiree Burch as Claire
- Lee Ross as Thomas
- Andi Osho as Maisie
- Tina Gray as Helen
- Eilidh Loan as Rhona
- Stephen Oswald as Angus
- Antony Strachan as Eamon
- Drew Barrymore as herself
- John Stahl as solicitor
- Tim Barrow as barkeep
- Joe McKay as Rhona's boyfriend
- Holly Woodhouse as Sophie's angry fan
- Barley the Lurcher-Cross as Hamish

Cameo appearances

- Mark Fleischmann as Frank De Luca from The Princess Switch franchise
- Suanne Braun as Mrs. Donatelli from The Princess Switch franchise

== Production ==
Dalmeny House, a Gothic Revival mansion to the north-west of Edinburgh, was used as the location for the film's Dun Dunbar Castle. Tantallon Castle was also used as a filming location. Parts of the film were also shot in South Queensferry. The village of Culross in Fife was used to portray the village of Dunbar.

The music in the film features the song "Celtic Heart" by Glasgow band Starsky & the Fox.

== Reception ==
The review aggregator website Rotten Tomatoes reported an approval rating of 74%, with an average score of 5.8/10, based on 23 reviews.

Writing for Variety, Courtney Howard called the film "gently disarming, heartening, holiday-themed escapism" and that it kept "genre-patented shenanigans and hijinks to a bare minimum, which is both a blessing and a curse." Writing for The Guardian, Jenny Colgan said there was "no jeopardy in this film at all: it is absolutely perfect for low-maintenance Christmas viewing" and that it was "lovely to see two great-looking actors who aren’t in the full flush of youth falling for one another." Gabriella Geisinger of Digital Spy said that the actors "manage to imbue their characters with a believable earnestness that belies the over cheese" and noted that the film was "mostly devoid of any socio-political landscape, which is a bit odd when a film is built on a system as controversial as aristocracy." The National said that the "main characters are obnoxious, the class politics are extremely dubious and the portrayal of rural village life incredibly patronising," but that "if you haven’t watched Cary Elwes try to catch fake snowflakes on his tongue, you haven’t lived." The imitations of Scottish accents and use of Scottish words and terms also met with mixed reactions.

== See also ==
- List of Christmas films
