= Florence Hall (actress) =

English actress

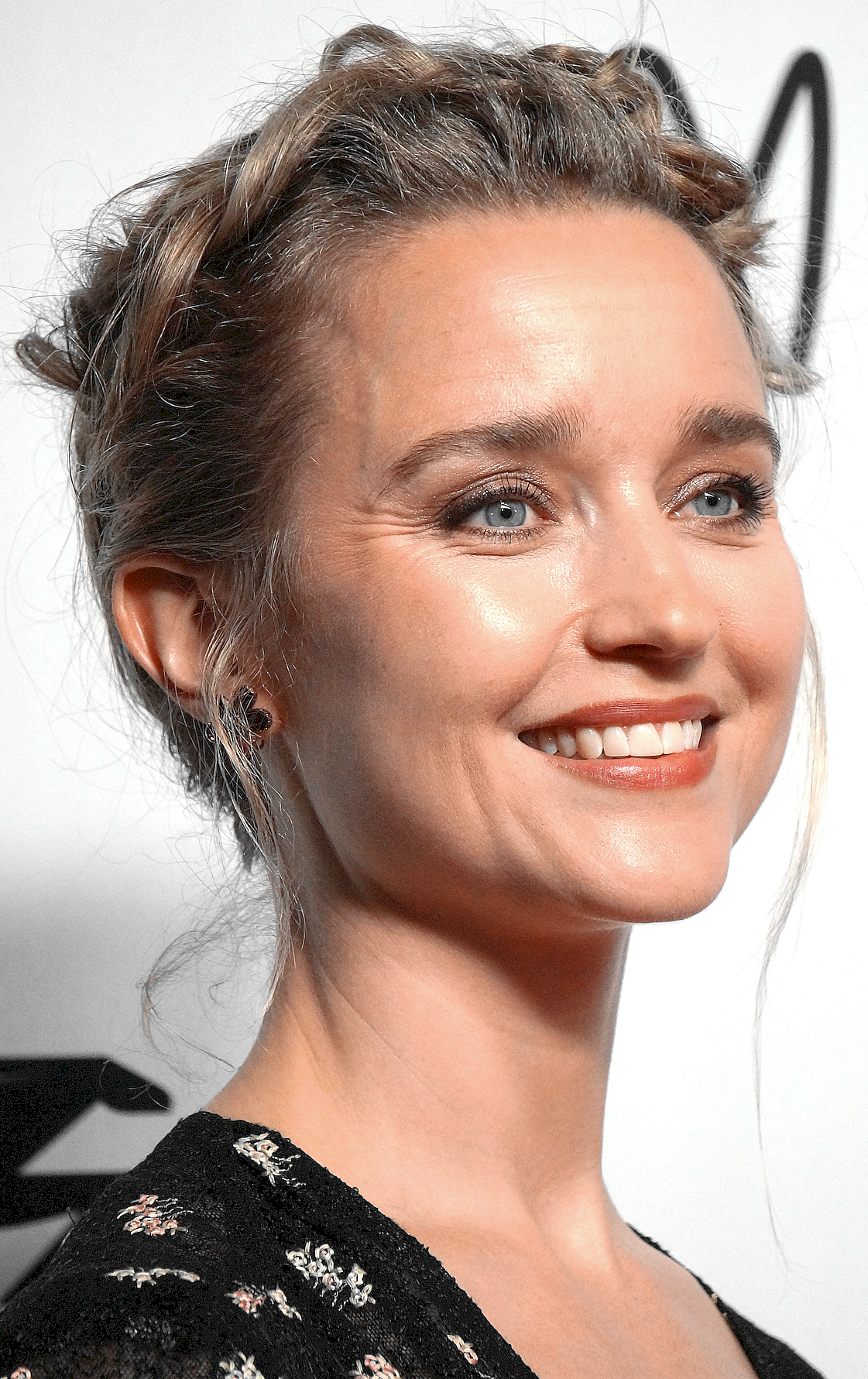
- Hall at the 2025 Film Fest Ghent
- Born: Florence Olivia Hall; 24 August 1987 (age 39); Cambridge, England
- Education: Drama Centre London
- Years active: 2010–present

Florence Olivia Hall (born 24 August 1987) is an English film, theatre, and television actress.

== Early life ==
Hall was born in Cambridge. She "was incredibly shy as a kid" so, when she was about seven years old, her mother and father enrolled her in a Saturday drama club to help build her confidence. As soon as she was in her first acting class it occurred to her, “Huh, so this is where I’m meant to be”. Hall graduated from the Drama Centre London in 2009.

== Career ==
Hall had an early role in BBC One mystery television series Jonathan Creek. she appeared as Mindy in The Princess Switch film series for Netflix. Hall appeared in the second series of Queens of Mystery in 2021. She portrayed Meghan in the 2023 film Bank of Dave.

Hall portrayed photographer Lee Miller in the 2025 Belgian English-language Whodunit television series This Is Not a Murder Mystery. That year, she was cast in the Christmas horror film The Holiday Hitman (originally titled Jingle All the Slay) and the English comedy film Blueberry Inn.

Hall also performs in theatre. Among others, she has appeared in Bekah Brunstetter's You May Go Now at the Finborough Theatre, in The Importance of Being Earnest at the Library Theatre, Manchester, and in Birdsong at the Harold Pinter Theatre, directed by Trevor Nunn. One of her favorite rolls was a departure from the roles she has usually played when in 2014 she played Rio Sparks, the character who works as a sex worker and leads a local girl-gang, in Philip Ridley’s Ghost from a Perfect Place at the Arcola Theatre.

== Filmography and television ==
Key
†	Denotes works that have not yet been released

Year	Title	Role	Notes
2010	Jonathan Creek	Young Emily	Episode "The Judas Tree"
2010	Remnants	Sara	Short film
2010	Holby City	Georgina Hunt	Series 12, episodes 42 and 43: "All Cried Out", "Two in Five Marriages"
2010	Doctors	Jessica Miles	Series 12, episode 19: "Idle Hands"
2012	Truth or Dare (in U.S. as Truth or Die)	Gemma Evans	Film
2012	The Telemachy	Emily	Film
2013	Mayday	Girl with Everett	Series 1, episode 3: "Episode #1.3"
2013	Dystopia	Christine	Short film
2015	The Coroner	Abby Naseby	Series 1, episode 6: "Capsized"
2015	Father Brown	Marion Sheppard	Series 3, episode 1: "The Man in the Shadows"
2017	Urban Myths	Klara	Series 1, episode 3: "Hitler and the Artist"
2018	Lovesick	Georgina	Series 3, episode 1: "Andi and Olivia"
2020	The Princess Switch: Switched Again	Mindy	Film
2021	The Princess Switch 3: Romancing the Star	Mindy	Film
2021	Queens of Mystery	Matilda Stone	6 episodes
2023	Bank of Dave	Meghan	Film
2025	This Is Not a Murder Mystery	Lee Miller	6 episodes
2026	The Holiday Hitman	Jayney	Film
2027	Blueberry Inn †	Elizabeth Arlington	Post-production
