= This Is Not a Murder Mystery =

Belgian television series

- Written by: Christophe Dirickx; Matthias Lebeer; Paul Baeten
- Directed by: Hans Herbots; Matthias Lebeer
- Starring: Pierre Gervais; Iñaki Mur; Florence Hall; Frank Bourke; Mike Hoffmann; Stephen Tompkinson
- Music by: Justine Bourgeus; Hannes De Maeyer
- Country of origin: Belgium
- Original language: English
- No. of series: 1
- No. of episodes: 6

Production
- Producers: Kato Maes; Kristoffel Mertens
- Production companies: Panenka; Deadpan Pictures

Original release
- Network: VRT 1
- Release: 26 October 2025

This Is Not a Murder Mystery is a Belgian English-language murder mystery miniseries, set in England during the 1930s with an ensemble cast featuring Pierre Gervais, Iñaki Mur, Florence Hall, Frank Bourke, Mike Hoffmann and Stephen Tompkinson. The series of six episodes first aired in 2025.

== Premise ==
Set on a lavish country estate in England during the 1930s, a collection of Surrealist artists wanting to become famous find themselves trapped with a serial killer.

== Cast ==
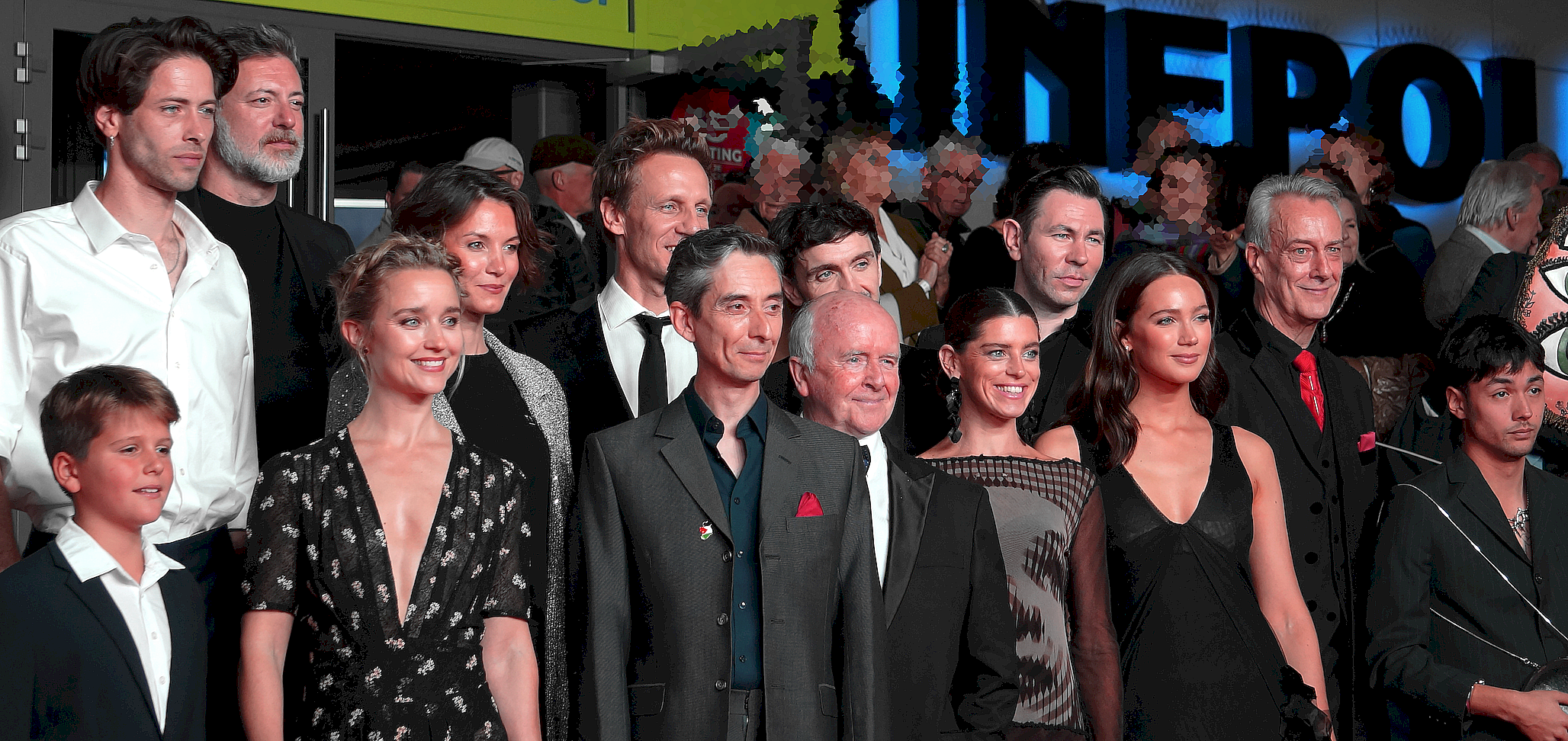

- Pierre Gervais as René Magritte
- Iñaki Mur as Salvador Dalí
- Florence Hall as Lee Miller
- Frank Bourke as Man Ray
- Mike Hoffmann as Max Ernst
- Stephen Tompkinson as DCI Thistletwaite
- Geert Van Rampelberg as ELT Mesens
- Oscar Louis Högström as Paul Nash
- Lauren Versnick as Sheila Legge
- Donna Banya as DC Mary Quant
- Jonathan Delaney Tynan as Archibald Jukes
- Mathilde Warnier as Georgette Magritte
- Regina Bikkinina as Gala Dalí
- Aoibhinn McGinnity as Lord James
- Eduardo Aladro as Pablo Picasso
- Brendan O’Rourke as Jay Poots
- Bérangère McNeese as Peggy Guggenheim

== Production ==
=== Development ===
The series is produced by Panenka in co-production with Deadpan Pictures and distributed by Studiocanal. The six-part series is directed by Hans Herbots and is based on an original idea by Christophe Dirickx and Matthias Lebeer and written and created by Dirickx and Paul Baeten with Lebeer as the co-director of episodes 3 and 4. The title is based on the "This is not a pipe" wording at the bottom of René Magritte's 1929 painting The Treachery of Images. The series has Kato Maes and Kristoffel Mertens as producers and was initially presented at the 2022 Co-Pro Series event, part of the Berlin Film Festival. It was filmed in Ireland and Belgium in 2024, mostly in the English-language. First look images from the set were released in November 2024.

=== Casting ===
The cast includes Pierre Gervais, Iñaki Mur, Florence Hall, Frank Bourke and Mike Hoffmann, but the director Herbots was quoted by Variety as saying that they chose "newcomers instead of established actors" because they did not want "famous faces drawing attention away from the characters…The show is a real ensemble piece, and I thought it was very important to find personalities that match but were also able to create conflict. We managed to get a really interesting ensemble". The cast also includes Stephen Tompkinson, Geert Van Rampelberg, Regina Bikkinina, Oscar Högström, Lauren Versnick, Donna Banya, Jonathan Delaney Tynan and Mathilde Warnier.
