= The Re-Education of Molly Singer =

- Directed by: Andy Palmer
- Written by: Todd M. Friedman; Kevin Haskin
- Produced by: Warner Davis; Todd M. Friedman
- Starring: Britt Robertson; Ty Simpkins; Jaime Pressly; Nico Santos; Cierra Ramirez
- Cinematography: Filip Vandewal
- Edited by: Tim Rush
- Music by: Jina Hyojin An; Shirley Song
- Production companies: Warner Davis Company; Hemlock Circle Productions
- Distributed by: Lionsgate
- Release date: September 29, 2023
- Running time: 120 minutes
- Country: United States
- Language: English

The Re-Education of Molly Singer is a 2023 American comedy film written by Todd M. Friedman and Kevin Haskin, directed by Andy Palmer and starring Britt Robertson.

== Plot ==
Molly Singer is a party girl lawyer who loves to have fun with her gay best friend Paulie who is a rich trust fund Asian that works as a lunch lady due to never finishing college and unlocking his trust fund. Elliot, the shy MMA-loving son of the CEO of Molly's firm, is going to college. On his first day, Elliot accidentally injures the star player of the university, which leads to everyone hating him. The exact same day, Molly is late to a very important hearing because she is hungover and costs the firm money. Elliot's mother decides to offer Molly a chance to get her job back if she goes back to college and helps her son Elliot. Molly helps Elliot hook up with his dream girl and get acclimated in university.

== Cast ==
- Britt Robertson as Molly Singer
- Ty Simpkins as Elliot
- Jaime Pressly as Brenda
- Nico Santos as Paulie
- Cierra Ramirez as Lindsay

== Release ==
The film was released in theaters and on VOD on September 29, 2023.

== Reception ==
The film has a 25% rating on Rotten Tomatoes based on 16 reviews. Bobby LePire of Film Threat rated the film an 8 out of 10. Kate Erbland of IndieWire graded the film a C−.
