= Suanne Braun =

South African TV presenter and actress

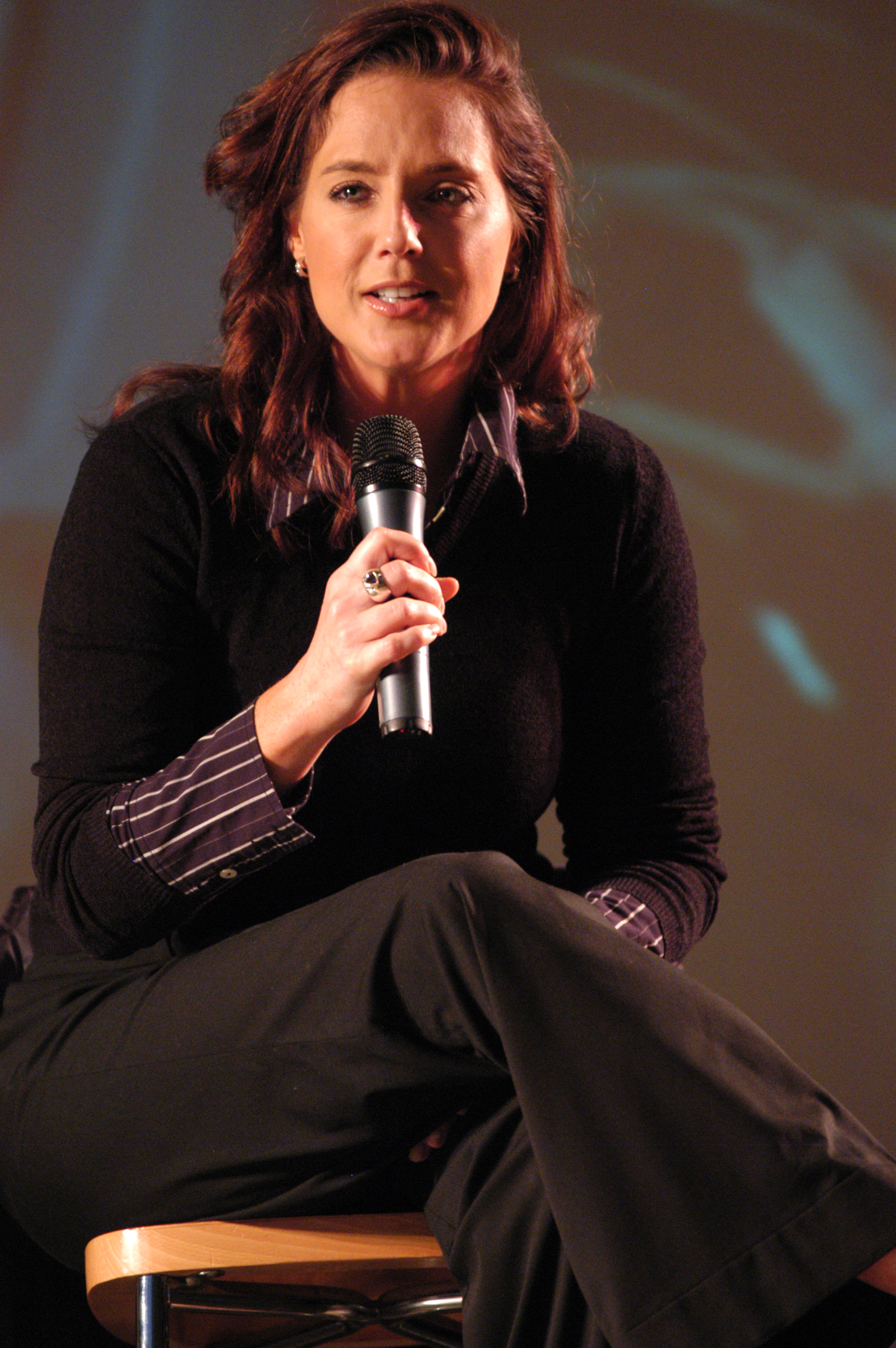
- Braun at a Stargate Convention in Cheltenham, England in 2006
- Born: South Africa
- Occupations: Actress, TV presenter
- Years active: 1988–present
- Spouse: Christopher Garner

Suanne Braun is a South African born actress. She lives in London, England.

== Early life ==
Braun made her professional debut in 1988 working as a TV presenter in her native South Africa for the channel M-net. She hosted her own travel series, Bon Voyage, which afforded her the opportunity to travel all over the world. She was nominated for a Star Tonight Award for Excellence in Television for Bon Voyage. During her time as a television host Braun co-presented Miss South Africa and Miss World for several years in the early 1990s.

During this time, Braun continued her stage and screen work starring in two of South Africa's seminal series, The Big Time (1 and 2) and the Afrikaans award-winning drama, Konings SABC. She had lead roles in both. Her stage work included plays and musical theatre. After a brief visit to the US, Braun was granted a green card. She spent the next 10 years living and working in LA. She has appeared in a number of American television shows and theatre productions including Wings, Just Shoot Me, Prowler opposite Scott Bakula and directed by Peter Bogdanovich, F/X: The Series and the popular sci fi series Stargate SG-1 in which Braun played goddess Hathor.

Theatre credits during this time include Private Lives for which she was nominated for Best Actress Fleur Du Cap Theatre Awards, Things We Do For Love, The Secret Lives of Henry And Alice, Offbeat Broadway (Nominated for Best Actress in a Musical) and Easy To Love – The Cole Porter Story in which Braun played Cole Porter's wife, Linda Porter.

Braun returned to her presenting roots during this time, hosting at the Academy Awards for South African television M-net and at the Spirit Awards celebrating Independent Film. Additionally Braun hosted The West Wing City Live event for NBC and the Weingart Foundation.

== Leaving South Africa ==
Braun has resided in London since 2002. Braun has continued to work in theatre and television. West End credits have included the role of Tanya in Mamma Mia at The Prince of Wales Theatre, returning in 2019 for the Mamma Mia 20th Anniversary Show at Novello Theatre, Fraulein Kost in Rufus Norris' production of Cabaret and Onassis starring Robert Lindsay. Braun appeared in the UK premiere of the musical Bernada Alba. Other theatre work includes: Private Lives, The Cherry Orchard and the world premiere of I Have Life based on the book about Alison Botha's rape and abduction in South Africa.

In 2019 Braun appeared in the one woman show "Sailing Somewhere" by Matthew Hurt and featuring original songs by Conor Mitchell.

Recent film and television work includes The Princess Switch (Netflix), Stephen Poliakoff's Summer of Rockets, Red Dwarf XI (HBO), the short film Sight, and All The Things You Are scheduled for release in 2021.

Braun is in demand as a voice artist and recently voiced campaigns for Lipton Tea, Confused.com and The New York Times.

As a singer, Braun can be heard singing lead vocals on the hit song, "All Night" for the South African band Goldfish.

== Personal life ==
Braun married Christopher Garner, son of South African actor Rex Garner, in 2002.

== Television ==
- Starhyke
- No Signal!
- Just Shoot Me!
- Stargate SG-1
- F/X: The Series
- Wings
- Silk Stalkings
- The Big Time (South African)
- Red Dwarf XI
- Summer Of Rockets
- UnPacking

== Film ==
- All the Things You Are
- The Last Warrior
- Sight
- Survivor (2015)
- A Royal Winter (2017)
- The Princess Switch (2018)
- The Princess Switch: Switched Again (2020)
- The Princess Switch 3: Romancing the Star (2021)
- A Castle for Christmas (2021) as Mrs. Donatelli (referencing herself from Princess Switch film series)

As herself:

- Revealing Mr. Maugham (2012) (BAFTA nomination)
