= Montana Manning =

British actress and singer

- Occupations: Actress; Singer
- Years active: 2005–present
- Television: Hollyoaks

Montana Manning is a British actress and singer. She was part of the girl group "Cookie", which toured with Girls Aloud. She had a background role in Harry Potter and the Goblet of Fire (2005) and then played Katia in the 2011 slasher film Demons Never Die. From 2011 to 2012, Manning portrayed Jodie Wilde in the soap opera Hollyoaks. She then went to appear in the films Legacy (2015) and Beverly Hills Ghost (2018). Manning was praised for her role as Jasmine in the American independent romantic drama film Daddy Issues (2018). After a guest appearance in Doctors in 2020, Manning has since played roles in the films Wrath of Man (2021), Jolly Good Christmas (2022) and The Holiday Hitman (2025).

== Life and career ==
When Montana Manning was five years old, her mother enrolled her in a weekly drama school, which Manning "absolutely loved". Manning then attended Sylvia Young Theatre School during weekends and, at 16, she achieved an extra role in the 2005 film Harry Potter and the Goblet of Fire. When she was 21, Manning got an agent and at 23 she appeared in an episode of the soap opera EastEnders. She played the role of Katia in the 2011 slasher film Demons Never Die. Manning is also a singer and was part of the pop girl group "Cookie". The group, including Manning, toured with Girls Aloud.

In November 2011, it was announced that Manning had joined the cast of the soap opera Hollyoaks as new character Jodie Wilde, with her first appearance airing the following month. Manning believed that she and Jodie both shared the same drive as she called herself "very ambitious". Manning said that she would not want to sing on the soap as she wanted to keep her singing career separate. Manning grew close to her colleague Holly Weston (Ash Kane) whilst working on the soap. Jodie's main storyline was being in a love triangle with established characters Dodger Savage (Danny Mac) and Texas Longford (Bianca Hendrickse-Spendlove). In May 2012, Manning confirmed on Twitter that she had left Hollyoaks after a five-month stint, and she added, "Seriously Thank you to everyone for all the #TEXIE love... it was so much fun". Hollyoaks producer Emma Smithwick later revealed in an interview that Manning was always meant to have a short stint on the soap due to her character only being brought in for a specific storyline.

Manning played the role of fashion designer and social media "diva" Jasmine in the 2018 American independent romantic drama film Daddy Issues. Manning's performance was praised by Justin Lowe from The Hollywood Reporter, writing that Manning made Jasmine the "center of every character's attention and desire" due to the actress' "straightforward take on relationship dynamics proves both refreshing and empowering". Manning's performance was also praised by Zoe Crombie from Film Enquiry, opining that whilst Manning was not given a lot to do, she was "captivating as Jasmine, fully realising the alluring and sensuous character established in the script, as well as giving her a toughness that aids Maya's character development well". Manning appeared in the 2015 comedy film Legacy. The actress also featured in the 2018 comedy-mystery film Beverly Hills Ghost. She later guest-starred in the BBC soap opera Doctors as patient Samya Mahmoud in the episode that originally aired on 25 November 2020.

Manning appeared action thriller film in the 2021 Wrath of Man. Manning played Emily in the 2022 Hallmark Christmas movie Jolly Good Christmas. In 2025, it was announced that Manning had joined the cast of the Christmas action comedy film The Holiday Hitman.

== Influences ==
Manning has said that she has been inspired by Will Smith since a young age. Manning respected Smith for refusing to swear in his films and music, in contrast to other actors that would go against what they believe in order to be in productions. The actress has said that she loves psychological horror and action films and would love to act in them. She has also cited Naomie Harris as being an inspiration to Black and British actresses.

== Filmography ==
Year	Title	Role	Notes	Ref.
Unknown	EastEnders	—N/a	Guest role (1 episode)	
2005	Harry Potter and the Goblet of Fire	Gryffindor Student	Film	
2011	Demons Never Die	Katia	Slasher film	
2011–12	Hollyoaks	Jodie Wilde	Regular role	
2015	Legacy	Emily	Film	
2018	Beverly Hills Ghost	Xandra	Comedy-mystery film	
2018	Daddy Issues	Jasmine	American independent film	
2020	Doctors	Samya Mahmoud	Guest role (1 episode)	
2021	Wrath of Man	Anna	Action thriller film	
2022	Jolly Good Christmas	Emily	Christmas movie	
2026	The Holiday Hitman	Jenny Carter	Christmas movie	
