= The Princess Switch =

2018 American Christmas romantic comedy film by Mike Rohl

- Official release poster
- Directed by: Mike Rohl
- Written by: Robin Bernheim; Megan Metzger
- Produced by: Amy Krell; Brad Krevoy; Linda L. Miller
- Starring: Vanessa Hudgens; Sam Palladio; Nick Sagar
- Cinematography: Viorel Sergovici; Lulu de Hillerin
- Edited by: Charles Norris
- Music by: Terry Frewer
- Production company: Motion Picture Corporation of America
- Distributed by: Netflix
- Release date: November 16, 2018
- Running time: 102 minutes
- Country: United States
- Language: English

The Princess Switch is a 2018 American Christmas romantic comedy film directed by Mike Rohl and written by Robin Bernheim and Megan Metzger. The film stars Vanessa Hudgens, Sam Palladio, and Nick Sagar.

The film's concept of two people who look identical running into one another and switching places comes from Mark Twain's 1881 novel The Prince and the Pauper.

It was released on November 16, 2018, by Netflix. The film is the first installment in The Princess Switch trilogy. It was followed by a sequel, The Princess Switch: Switched Again, which premiered on November 19, 2020, and The Princess Switch 3: Romancing the Star, which premiered on November 18, 2021.

== Plot ==
A week before Christmas, Stacy’s assistant and best friend, Kevin tells her that he has secretly entered her in a prestigious baking competition in the Kingdom of Belgravia. Initially reluctant, Stacy agrees to go there with Kevin and his daughter Olivia after a brief encounter with her ex-boyfriend and his new girlfriend.

At the competition space, Stacy runs into her culinary school rival Brianna, who deliberately stains her apron. In the dressing room, she then runs into Lady Margaret Delacourt, Duchess of Montenaro and fiancée of Crown Prince Edward of Belgravia. They are both shocked to realize they look exactly like each other.

Desperate for time out of the spotlight and to try an ordinary life, Margaret suggests to Stacy that they switch places for two days, then switch back before the competition and her and Edward's wedding. Initially reluctant, Stacy eventually accepts. This is because Lady Margaret agrees to sponsor Olivia as a student in Belgravia's acclaimed summer ballet program.

Stacy and Margaret quickly teach each other about their lives and behavior to minimize suspicion, and part ways. Olivia quickly discovers the switch but helps keep the secret while bonding with Margaret. Meanwhile, Prince Edward – who was supposed to be away on business for the two days of the switch – changes his plans to spend time with his fiancée.

King George senses something is afoot, so tasks his butler Frank to watch her. Stacy adapts to court life and begins falling in love with Prince Edward, while Margaret falls in love with Kevin and realizes that she loves living a normal life. Despite this, the women switch back as planned. Meanwhile, Brianna sneaks into the TV station one night and sabotages Stacy's mixer.

Frank photographs Margaret and Stacy together, and shows that they swapped identities to the Queen. She then fakes illness to send Edward and Margaret to attend the competition in her place. There, due to Brianna's vandalism, Stacy is forced to mix her ingredients by hand.

Despite the setback, Stacy and Kevin win first prize, with medals presented by Lady Margaret and Prince Edward, where their switch is discovered. Margaret professes her love for Kevin, while Stacy walks away, feeling out of place in Edward's royal life. Edward stops her and proposes, suggesting a Christmas wedding in a year if they are still in love.

One year later, Stacy marries Prince Edward and becomes Princess of Belgravia, and Margaret catches the bouquet.

== Cast ==
- Vanessa Hudgens as
  - Stacy Juliette DeNovo, a baker from Chicago; later Princess of Belgravia
  - Lady Margaret Katherine Claire Delacourt, Duchess of Montenaro
- Sam Palladio as Edward Wyndham, Prince of Belgravia
- Nick Sagar as Kevin Richards, Stacy's best friend and Olivia's father
- Alexa Adeosun as Olivia Richards, Kevin's daughter and Stacy’s goddaughter
- Mark Fleischmann as Frank De Luca, Prince Edward's driver
- Suanne Braun as Mrs. Donatelli, Duchess Margret's personal assistant
- Sara Stewart as Queen Caroline Wyndham, Prince Edward's mother and Queen of Belgravia
- Pavel Douglas as King George Wyndham, Prince Edward's father and King of Belgravia
- Amy Griffiths as Brianna Michaels, Stacy's baking rival
- Robin Soans as Kindly Old Man

== Production ==
In June 2018, it was reported that Vanessa Hudgens and Sam Palladio would star in the Netflix film The Princess Switch.

Principal photography ended in June 2018. The majority of the film was shot in Carei, Romania. The palace sequence was shot in Károlyi Castle, Carei Romania.

== Release ==
It was released on November 16, 2018, by Netflix.

== Reception ==
On Rotten Tomatoes, the film holds an approval rating of 63% with an average rating of 5.6/10, based on 16 reviews. The website's critics consensus reads: "The Princess Switch offers a healthy dose of charming, light-hearted, twin-swap fun and is delightful viewing for any hopeless romantic."

Linda Holmes of NPR praised the movie's acting and called it "pleasingly frothy and ridiculous", while criticizing unrealistic aspects of the plot.

== Sequels ==
A sequel The Princess Switch: Switched Again, was released on November 19, 2020. Vanessa Hudgens took on another role as a third lookalike as well as served as a producer.

The next of its sequel The Princess Switch 3: Romancing the Star, was released on November 18, 2021. Vanessa Hudgens played three lookalikes as well as served as a producer.

== See also ==
- List of Christmas films
