= Truth or Dare (2012 film) =

British psychological thriller film

- DVD cover
- Directed by: Robert Heath
- Written by: Matthew McGuchan
- Produced by: Richard Johns; Rupert Jermyn
- Starring: David Oakes; Liam Boyle; Jack Gordon; Florence Hall; Jennie Jacques; Tom Kane; Jason Maza; Alexander Vlahos
- Cinematography: James Friend
- Edited by: Oliver Parker
- Music by: Richard Pryn
- Production companies: Corona Pictures; AV Pictures; Met Film Post
- Distributed by: Cine-Britannia
- Release date: 27 August 2012 (United Kingdom)
- Running time: 95 minutes
- Country: United Kingdom
- Language: English

Truth or Dare (released in the United States as Truth or Die) is a 2012 British psychological horror film directed by Robert Heath and written by Matthew McGuchan. The film stars David Oakes, Tom Kane, Jennie Jacques, Liam Boyle, Jack Gordon, Florence Hall and Alexander Vlahos. It made 2.5 million at the box office against its budget of 1 million.

== Plot ==
At a Halloween party, a shy boy named Felix arrives alone. Among the guests are spoilt Chris, his mild-mannered girlfriend Gemma, their friend Paul, his abrasive girlfriend Eleanor, and drug-dealer Luke. Felix, who is smitten with Gemma, accepts cocaine from Luke and musters the courage to ask her out. She declines politely. Upstairs, Paul and Eleanor start to have sex but Paul passes out drunk, so Eleanor goes downstairs and starts a game of "Truth or Dare". Felix picks truth and, Eleanor asks who he would sex with if he could. Felix names Gemma, provoking Chris to punch him. Gemma breaks up with Chris and comforts Felix.

Months later, the friends receive invitations to Felix's "surprise" birthday party. They arrive at his grand but deserted mansion, only to be redirected by the groundsman, Woodbridge, to a remote shack in the woods. There they meet the imposing Justin, Felix's elder brother and an ex-soldier returned from Afghanistan. Justin casually uses homophobic slurs and eventually reveals that Felix isn't going to be there because he hung himself in that shack the night after Halloween. In his pocket was a postcard reading "Truth or Dare, bitch!" Justin insists no one leaves until they admit who wrote it. When they try to escape, he shoots Paul in the leg and forces Luke to tie up the others.

To continue the game, Justin explains "The Acid Test." Justin forces a tube down Gemma's throat and demands Chris choose which one of two identical jars that he will force her to drink from. One has water and the other has battery acid. Chris chooses a jar and fortunately, it turns out to be water. Justin hooks Chris up next, but it's Paul's turn to choose. Paul unwittingly picks acid and Chris bleeds to death.

Jonesy, Luke's dealer, shows up after following them there. Justin breaks Jonesy's arm then hands Luke a gun loaded with 3 bullets and three empty chamber. He spins the chamber and tells Luke he can fire at Jonesy or Justin himself. However, if he fires at Justin and it's an empty chamber, Justin will kill him. Luke chooses to fire at Jonesy and kills him. While this is going on, Gemma breaks free and flees to the mansion.

At the mansion, Gemma finds a paralysed Felix tended by the groundsman, Woodbridge. He tells Gemma that he rescued Felix after the hanging, but his mind and body no longer work right. Gemma struggles to get the gun Woodbridge is holding, but he is fatally wounded in the struggle. Justin arrives and snaps Gemma's neck before Felix's eyes.

Back at the shed, Luke refuses to free Paul and Eleanor, boasting that he sent the postcard. Eleanor asks him to share his cocaine, but then bites off his little finger when he goes to let her snort it. Luke stumbles back, impales himself fatally on a tool, and dies. Paul and Eleanor try to escape but Justin returns with Felix in a wheelchair. They fight and during the struggle, Eleanor shoots Justin in the shoulder, then smashes the jar with the remaining acid over his head.

Afterwards, Justin is now tied to a post. Paul runs out to escape. Eleanor stays back and reveals that the postcard wasn't why Felix tried to kill himself. She had Felix perform oral sex on an unconscious Paul, and recorded it so she could blackmail him. However, the day before Justin came home is when Felix tried to kill himself. He was scared of Justin and what he would do to him when he found out about him performing oral sex on a guy, since he's so homophobic.

Eleanor hands Felix a grenade and tells him to do what he wants. She runs out to the car and Felix gradually works out the pin, causing the grenade to explode, killing both brothers. Eleanor and Paul drive off into the night.

== Cast ==
- David Oakes as Justin
- Tom Kane as Felix
- Liam Boyle as Paul
- Jack Gordon as Chris
- Florence Hall as Gemma
- Jennie Jacques as Eleanor
- Alexander Vlahos as Luke
- Jason Maza as Jonesy
- David Sterne as Woodbridge

== Release ==
The distribution rights were sold at the American Film Market on 3 November 2011.

=== Home media ===
Truth or Dare was released straight-to-video on 27 August 2012 in the United Kingdom and 9 October in the United States.

== Reception ==
Dave Aldridge of Radio Times stated in his movie review: "Truth or Dare is slickly made and decently acted. It has its bloody horror film moments, but director Robert Heath wisely puts equal emphasis on the psychology of its hostage situation".
