= Shirley Song =

Composer

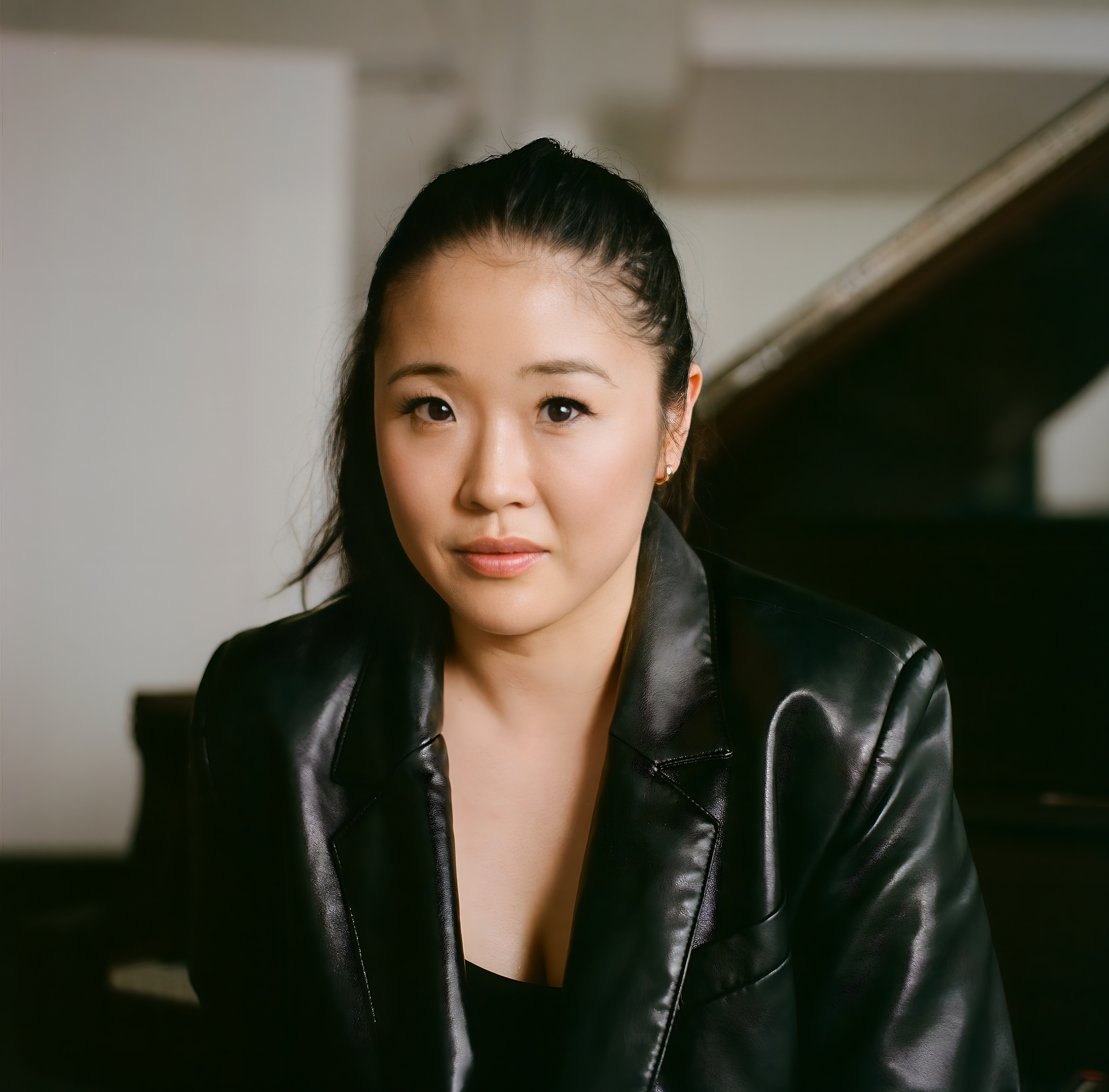
- Born: Sydney, Australia
- Occupation: Composer
- Years active: 2017–present
- Notable work: Exploding Kittens; XO, Kitty
- Website: shirleysong.com

Shirley Song is an Australian-born Chinese film and TV composer. She has composed and co-composed scores for an array of films and television shows, including Slanted, Netflix's Exploding Kittens (2024), XO, Kitty (2023), Five Blind Dates (2024), The Re-education of Molly Singer (2023), A Tourist's Guide to Love (2023), and Princess Switch 3: Romancing the Star (2021).

== Early life ==
Song was born in Sydney, Australia where she grew up playing piano, acting and performing in theatre productions. She graduated with a Bachelor of Music (Composition)(Hons) degree from the Sydney Conservatorium of Music, University of Sydney. After graduating she continued her studies in Film Scoring at the Berklee College of Music.

== Career ==
Song has collaborated with composer Jina Hyojin An and have co-scored Netflix's Princess Switch 3: Romancing the Star featuring Vanessa Hudgens, Amazon Prime's Five Blind Dates, and A Tourist's Guide to Love, starring Rachael Leigh Cook. They were nominated for Best Score for TV/Streamed Movie award at the Hollywood Music in Media Awards, Netflix's XO, Kitty, where their soundtrack was released by Lakeshore Records and limited edition pink vinyl.

In 2024, Song and An scored the feature dramedy, The Everything Pot, which premiered at the 2024 Tribeca Festival as well as completing the music for the Netflix adult animation Exploding Kittens, based on the popular table top game of the same name.

== Filmography ==
=== Films ===
Year	Title	Director	Studio(s)	Notes
2025	Slanted	Amy Wang	Fox Entertainment Studios	Music by Shirley Song
2024	Five Blind Dates	Shawn Seet	Amazon Studios	Co-Composed with Jina Hyojin An
2024	The Everything Pot	Sherise Dorf	—	Co-Composed with Jina Hyojin An
2023	The Re-Education of Molly Singer	Andy Palmer	Myriad Pictures; Lionsgate Films	Co-Composed with Jina Hyojin An
2023	A Tourist's Guide to Love	Steven Tsuchida	Muse Entertainment; Netflix	Co-Composed with Jina Hyojin An
2021	The Princess Switch 3: Romancing the Star	Michael Rohl	Motion Picture Corporation of America; Brad Krevoy Productions; Netflix	Co-Composed with Jina Hyojin An
2018	Freelancers Anonymous	Sonia Sebastian	Indie Rights	Co-Composed with Jina Hyojin An

=== Television ===
Year	Title	Creators	Studio(s)	Notes
2025	Bearbrick	Meghan McCarthy	DreamWorks Animation Television; Dentsu Entertainment; Apple TV+	Co-Composed with Jina Hyojin An
2024	Exploding Kittens	Matthew Inman; Shane Kosakowski	Bandera Entertainment; Netflix	Co-Composed with Jina Hyojin An
2023 -	XO, Kitty	Jenny Han; Sascha Rothchild	Ace Entertainment; Awesomeness; Netflix	Co-Composed with Jina Hyojin An

== Awards and nominations ==
Association	Year	Work	Category	Result	Notes	Ref.
Hollywood Music in Media Awards (HMMA)	2023	A Tourist's Guide to Love	Best Original Score - Animated Film	Nominated	Shared with Jina Hyojin An	
