= The Holiday Hitman =

American action film

- Theatrical release poster
- Directed by: Bradley Stryker
- Written by: Charley McDougal; Bradley Stryker
- Produced by: Jamie McLeod-Ross; Charley McDougall; Nick Sagar
- Starring: Nick Sagar; Ricky Norwood; Alexa Adeosun; Julio Cesar Cedillo
- Cinematography: Simon Stolland
- Edited by: Mark Keady
- Music by: Lorenzo Barcella
- Production companies: Empire Studios; Stryke-Force Films; 8th Law Pictures; Everly Entertainment
- Distributed by: Saban Films
- Release date: November 3, 2026
- Running time: 98 minutes
- Countries: United States; United Kingdom; Canada
- Language: English

The Holiday Hitman is a 2026 Christmas action comedy film. It is directed by Bradley Stryker and co-written by Charley McDougal with Stryker. It is starring Nick Sagar, Ricky Norwood, Alexa Adeosun and Julio Cesar Cedillo.

== Premise ==
A wanted hitman has to fend off assassins while trying to save his marriage with a luxury Christmas break.

== Cast ==
- Nick Sagar as Hank Carter
- Ricky Norwood
- Alexa Adeosun
- Julio Cesar Cedillo as Mordecai
- Adam Korson as Bob
- Montana Manning as Jenny Carter
- Bradley Stryker as Paulie
- Florence Hall as Jayney
- Eloise Lovell Anderson as Delilah
- Mark Fleischmann as Father McDougall
- Vas Blackwood as Reggie
- Gabriela Ochoa Perez as Hannah Carter
- Tim Cullingworth-Hudson as Mike
- Amber Doig-Thorne as The Red Ninja

== Production ==
The film is produced by Empire Studios and Stryke-Force Films, with 8th Law Pictures and Everly Entertainment Production. It is co-written by Charley McDougall and Bradley Stryker, who is also the director. Producers are Jamie McLeod-Ross, McDougall, and Nick Sagar, with Arthur Corber executive producing.

The cast is led by Sagar, Ricky Norwood and Alexa Adeosun. The cast also includes Julio Cesar Cedillo, Adam Korson and Montana Manning, as well as Stryker, Florence Hall, Eloise Lovell Anderson, Mark Fleischmann, Vas Blackwood, Gabriela Ochoa Perez and Tim Cullingworth-Hudson. The film was in post-production by February 2025.

== Release ==
The film was initially being aimed for a Christmas 2025 release. Originally titled Jingle All the Slay, Saban Films acquired North American distribution rights the following year with the title confirmed as The Holiday Hitman. On 7 May 2026, Prestige International Pictures acquired the international rights to the film and launched sales at the Marché du Film during the Cannes Film Festival. It was released in the United States on November 3, 2026.
