= Daddy Issues (film) =

2018 film by Amara Cash

- Theatrical release poster
- Directed by: Amara Cash
- Screenplay by: Alex Bloom
- Story by: Amara Cash; Alex Bloom
- Produced by: Jenna Cedicci
- Starring: Madison Lawlor; Montana Manning; Andrew Pifko
- Cinematography: Nico Aguilar
- Edited by: Amara Cash
- Music by: Maxton Waller; Patrick Ridgen
- Production company: Under 1 Roof Productions
- Release date: February 2018 (AZUFF PHX)
- Running time: 88 minutes
- Country: United States
- Language: English

Daddy Issues is a 2018 American independent romantic drama film directed by Amara Cash about a 19-year-old queer "pixie" who becomes ensnared in a love triangle after falling for a sexually-fluid online crush. The film was screened at multiple film festivals and received many accolades.

== Plot ==
Nineteen year old Maya lives at home with her mother and step-father. She is a very unhappy artist who wants to go to art school in Florence, Italy. Simon is a drug addict doctor who has fantasy sex with Jasmine who dresses up as a little girl. Simon has a dinner with his father each year on his dead mother's birthday. She died 11 years ago.

Maya and Jasmine meet on-line and have a same-sex relationship. Maya moves in with Jasmine. Jasmine continues her heterosexual affair with Dr. Simon. The doctor has set up a child's bedroom in his garage and pays Jasmine $5,000 a month. Maya is almost hit by a driver who is Simon. It turns out that Simon is Maya's father that she has not seen in six years. Maya's mother has lied to her about her father not wanting contact with her and has been spending the child support. Simon and Maya rekindle a relationship.

One day Simon sees his daughter and Jasmine in a sexual embrace. He realizes that his lover is in an affair with his daughter. He ends his relationship with Jasmine and Jasmine in turn breaks up with Maya. When Simon offers to pay Maya to go to school in Italy, she figures out Jasmine was her father's lover. The triangle love affair is exposed.

Maya goes to art school in Florence and is successful in selling her art clothing. One day she sees a woman in Florence wearing her clothing line and the film ends with them being friends.

== Cast ==
- Madison Lawlor as Maya Mitchell
- Montana Manning as Jasmine Jones
- Andrew Pifko as Simon Craw
- Monte Markham as Gordon Craw
- Kamala Jones as Danielle Mitchell
- Seth Cassell as Jim Mitchell
- Brian Gilleece as Doug
- Jodi Carol Harrison as Bobbi Jones

== Screenings ==
Daddy Issues was screened at:

- Arizona Underground Film Festival (2018)
- Boston LGBT Film Festival (2018)
- Fort Myers Film Festival (2018)
- Inside Out Film and Video Festival (2018)
- Film Festival International in London and Nice (both 2018)
- MidWest WeirdFest (2018)
- Northern Virginia International Film Festival (2018)
- SOHO International Film Festival (2018)
- Outfest Los Angeles LGBTQ Film Festival (2018)

== Reception ==
The film was hailed as a "dark romance with a tender heart" at the 2018 Inside Out Film and Video Festival in Toronto, Canada, whose reviewers lauded Amara Cash for her "vision, style, and twisted sense of humour". Punch Drunk Critics also gave the film – which it described as an "exquisitely messed up [and] beautiful nightmare" – a positive review, awarding it 4 out of 5 stars for, among other things, its "fascinating and deeply disturbing script" and "visual style".

== Accolades ==
List of awards and nominations
Event/Body	Year	Award	Recipient	Result	Ref.
Arizona Underground Film Festival	2018	Jury Award	Daddy Issues	Won	
Fort Myers Film Festival	2018	Best Feature	Daddy Issues	Won	
Film Festival International (London)	2018	Best Cinematography in a Feature Film	Nico Aguilar	Won	
Film Festival International (London)	2018	Best Director	Amara Cash	Won	
MidWest WeirdFest	2018	Best Director	Amara Cash	Won	
Film Festival International (Nice)	2018	Best Original Screenplay of a Feature Film	Alex Bloom	Nominated	
Film Festival International (Nice)	2018	Best Lead Actress	Madison Lawlor	Nominated	
Northern Virginia International Film Festival	2018	Best Feature Film	Daddy Issues	Won	
Northern Virginia International Film Festival	2018	Best Acting Ensemble	Daddy Issues	Nominated	
Northern Virginia International Film Festival	2018	Best Director	Amara Cash	Nominated	
Northern Virginia International Film Festival	2018	Best Cinematography	Daddy Issues	Nominated	
Northern Virginia International Film Festival	2018	Best Editing	Daddy Issues	Nominated	
Northern Virginia International Film Festival	2018	Best Screenplay	Alex Bloom	Won	
Northern Virginia International Film Festival	2018	Best Actress	Montana Manning	Won	
Northern Virginia International Film Festival	2018	Best Supporting Actor	Andrew Pifko	Won	
Northern Virginia International Film Festival	2018	Best Supporting Actress	Kamala Jones	Won	
Northern Virginia International Film Festival	2018	Best Score	Daddy Issues	Nominated	
Northern Virginia International Film Festival	2018	Best LGBT Film	Daddy Issues	Nominated	
