= Strange Magic (film) =

2015 film by Gary Rydstrom

- Theatrical release poster
- Directed by: Gary Rydstrom
- Screenplay by: David Berenbaum; Irene Mecchi; Gary Rydstrom
- Story by: George Lucas
- Produced by: Mark S. Miller
- Starring: Alan Cumming; Evan Rachel Wood; Elijah Kelley; Meredith Anne Bull; Kristin Chenoweth; Maya Rudolph; Sam Palladio; Alfred Molina
- Edited by: Chris Plummer
- Music by: Marius de Vries
- Production companies: Lucasfilm; Lucasfilm Animation; Industrial Light & Magic
- Distributed by: Walt Disney Studios Motion Pictures (Note: Distributed by Walt Disney Studios Motion Pictures through the Touchstone Pictures banner.)
- Release date: January 23, 2015
- Running time: 99 minutes
- Country: United States
- Language: English
- Budget: $70–100 million
- Box office: $13.6 million

Strange Magic is a 2015 American animated jukebox musical romance fantasy comedy film directed by Gary Rydstrom, screenplay written by Rydstrom, David Berenbaum, and Irene Mecchi based on a story written by George Lucas and inspired by William Shakespeare's A Midsummer Night's Dream. The film stars the voices of Alan Cumming, Evan Rachel Wood, Elijah Kelley, Meredith Anne Bull, Kristin Chenoweth, Maya Rudolph, Sam Palladio, and Alfred Molina. It follows the leader of the Dark Forest known as the Bog King, who hates the notion of love and orders the destruction of all primroses, a flower used to create love potions. However, he begins to change his mind upon meeting the feisty fairy princess Marianne whose heart was broken by her philandering fiancé Roland. Meanwhile, the elf Sunny seeks to have a love potion made so he may make Marianne's sister Dawn fall in love with him.

George Lucas, who had long wanted to make a film for his three daughters, had been developing the project for 15 years before production began, and described the film as Star Wars for a female audience. The musical score was composed by Marius de Vries, and the soundtrack consists of numerous historical pop songs spanning several decades.

Strange Magic was released in theaters in the United States on January 23, 2015, by Walt Disney Studios Motion Pictures through the Touchstone Pictures banner. The film received negative reviews from critics and was a box-office bomb, grossing $13.6 million against a $70–100 million budget.

== Plot ==
A magical realm is divided between the Fairy Kingdom and the Dark Forest. When fairy princess Marianne sees her fiancé, Roland, kissing another fairy on their wedding day, she vows never to fall in love again. In the Dark Forest, the Bog King has the same view on love, despite his caring mother Griselda's protests.

Marianne's sister, Dawn, and her elf friend, Sunny, are nearly devoured by a giant lizard before Marianne rescues them. After falling through the border and into the Dark Forest, Sunny finds a primrose petal and hides it. At the Spring Ball, Roland tries to win back Marianne, who angrily drives him away. Roland consults his warriors, who jokingly tell him to procure a love potion to woo Marianne. Roland then encounters Sunny, who has an unrequited love for Dawn, and convinces him to venture into the Dark Forest to get the love potion so they can use it on their respective fairies. Sunny goes back and finds the hidden primrose petal and, with the guidance of an Imp, travels to the Bog King's lair, where the Sugar Plum Fairy was being held prisoner by the Bog King. Sunny finds the Sugar Plum Fairy, who agrees to make the love potion if Sunny promises to set her free.

Plum's escape rouses Bog King, who recaptures her while Sunny and the Imp escape. Sunny returns to the ball and tries to hit Dawn with the love potion. Bog interrupts the celebrations and captures Dawn just as she is sprayed by the love potion and the imp steals it in order to spread it throughout the forest. Bog orders them to deliver the potion to him by moon-down or he will harm Dawn. Defying her father's order, Marianne flies off after her sister while he grants Roland a small army to head off on foot to Bog's castle.

Dawn falls in love with Bog due to the potion, and Bog has her imprisoned for his own sanity. Marianne arrives and fights with Bog to return her sister. When she realizes the severity of the situation, the two of them begin to find common interests. When they consult Sugar Plum for an antidote, she explains that true love will negate the effects of the potion. Bog had not known this, as he refused to listen to Sugar Plum after his failed attempt with the love potion years before. A mutual attraction begins to develop between Marianne and Bog, but only Griselda sees it.

Sunny recovers the potion from the imp and gives it to Roland as they march on to the castle. Bog sees this and suspects that Marianne had set him up, breaking his heart again as he leaves her stranded in a spider web. She escapes and joins in the battle taking place at the castle. Sunny frees Sugar Plum, Dawn, and the love-stricken forest creatures that the imp had hit with the love potion.

In the escape, Bog holds the mouth of his den open long enough for everyone to escape. He survives, to Marianne's relief, and Sunny reveals his true feelings to Dawn. After realizing her love for Sunny, the spell of the love potion breaks, and the two kiss. Roland returns after appearing to fall to his death, love potion in hand. He sprays Marianne, much to the dismay of Bog, and she appears to be under the spell and begins singing. Sugar Plum holds a very outraged Bog back and urges him to wait and watch. While going in for a kiss, Marianne punches Roland, who falls into the crevice after being sprayed with the falling love potion. It is revealed that the potion did not work on Marianne because she is already in love with someone else. Bog and Marianne finally admit their feelings for each other and kiss.

In a post-credits scene, Roland returns to his warriors and has fallen madly in love with a female insect who Griselda had presented to Bog as a potential wife earlier in the movie, much to his warriors' disgust.

== Voice cast ==
- Alan Cumming as the Bog King, a Scottish-accented goblin who is the ruler of the Dark Forest, Griselda’s son and has mosquito-like wings.
- Evan Rachel Wood as Marianne, a fairy with butterfly-like wings who is the oldest daughter of Dagda, the older sister of Dawn and never wanted to fall in love ever again.
- Kristin Chenoweth as Sugar Plum Fairy, a blue wingless fairy with a genie-like lower half is the creator of the love potion, and was trapped in a cage for many years.
- Maya Rudolph as Griselda, a goblin who is the former queen of the Dark Forest and Bog’s mother.
- Alfred Molina as the Fairy King, the ruler of the Fairy Kingdom and the father of Marianne and Dawn. His name was never mentioned in the film, but was named “Dagda” by the animators.
- Elijah Kelley as Sunny, an elf who is the love interest of Dawn.
- Meredith Anne Bull as Dawn, the youngest daughter of Dagda, the younger sister of Marianne, and is the love interest of Sunny.
- Sam Palladio as Roland, a fairy who cheated on Marianne on their wedding day and wants to fall in love with her again by spraying the love potion on her.
- Bob Einstein as Stuff, a troll who is one of the two henchmen of the Bog King. Despite sounding like a male, they are revealed to be a female at the end of the film.
- Peter Stormare as Thang, a troll who is one of the two henchmen of the Bog King.
- Kevin Michael Richardson as Brutus, a giant troll who is the largest resident of the Dark Forest.
- Llou Johnson as Pare, an elf who went to retrieve Dawn with Sunny.
- Robbie Daymond as Fairy Cronies, a fairy trio, with each one event being green, pink and purple.
- Brenda Chapman as the imp, a small bilby-like creature who is always causing chaos throughout the film.
- Gary Rydstrom as Angry Gus, a background character.
- Tony Cox as Plum Elf, a background character.

== Production ==
Writer/producer George Lucas had long wanted to make a film for his three daughters, having had this original idea 15 years prior to its production. He described the film as Star Wars for a female audience, stating "Star Wars was for 12-year-old boys; I figured I'd make one for 12-year-old girls." About the plot, co-writer and director Gary Rydstrom stated, "We pitched it as a Beauty and the Beast story where the Beast doesn't change." According to Rydstrom, Lucas, who ultimately served as executive producer and story writer on the project, "really wanted to make a beautiful fairy tale with goblins and elves, and do it in a way that only this company can do. He had been working on it for a long time." Rydstrom mentioned that Lucas emphasized that the story should be about "finding beauty in strange places". Rydstrom also stated "It was important for him to tell this story where you saw the beauty in something you didn't expect to see—that it looked ugly on the outside but you saw the beauty underneath." The film was in development for 15 years, including alongside the Star Wars prequels. Before The Walt Disney Company acquired Lucasfilm in late 2012, production on Strange Magic was already well underway. The crew, including Rydstrom, screened the film for Disney executives. Rydstrom stated, "We're not Pixar or Disney Animation, so in some ways George was our John [Lasseter] on this one [...] I like the fact—not that I don't like advice from all over—but this is our own thing, this is a Lucasfilm project ... I remember when Labyrinth came out and how exciting that was. There was a magic to that, this has the same vibe to me."

One of the biggest inspirations for the soundtrack was another Lucasfilm production, American Graffiti (1973). For Strange Magic, Lucas revealed: "I had a lot of Beatles songs in there originally, but we couldn't afford them." Many of the songs that did make it into the film were tweaked to help tell the story such as "Bad Romance", which became a march for an invading army, and "I'll Never Fall in Love Again", which was made into a warrior anthem for Marianne. According to Lucas, the main message of the film is that "A real relationship rests in a much deeper place, where you love somebody and you've thought through it carefully as you've been carrying on conversations and doing things. You fall in love with their mind and everything else more than just the way they look." The crew experimented with the idea of having the entirety of the dialogue sung.

The hair design of sisters Marianne and Dawn went through several revisions. According to Meredith Anne Bull, the voice of Dawn, "[The sisters'] hair has changed a lot since the beginning, we used to have long, brown hair. It was red for a while and now it has ended up short and blonde! [...] There's a lot of work that goes into creating the hair of an animated character. There are actually groups of people where that's their only job, to do the animation of hair! That was really cool, learning that." On the subject of voice recording, Bull stated, "There's just a lot of really cool stuff [that our director] would show us—tricks and stuff to do when we were recording: Special effects with our mouths, or by chewing stuff. One time I watched Peter Stormare chew an entire pack of gum while he was trying to record!" Bull also noted that while recording she did not have many visuals to reference, "For the first year of production, I really had no idea, sometimes they would have drawings, but other than that I just had to use my imagination of what was going on!"

== Music ==
Strange Magic (Original Motion Picture Soundtrack)

Soundtrack album by Various artists
- Released: January 20, 2015
- Studios: Air Lyndhurst Studios, London; Berry Drive Studios, Los Angeles; Downtown Recording Studios, NYC; Nightbird Studios, Los Angeles; MSR Studios, New York City; The Fan Club, London
- Genres: Rock, pop, soul
- Length: 38:04
- Label: Buena Vista
- Producers: Marius De Vries; George Lucas; Steven Gizicki

The soundtrack includes cast performances of new versions of pop and classic rock songs which were chosen by George Lucas. The soundtrack was released by Buena Vista Records on January 20, 2015, followed by a physical release on February 17, 2015.

Some songs are in the film, but not in the album. An instrumental of "People Are Strange" is during the mushrooms' first spread messages through the bog forest, and the chorus from "Bad Romance" is a march for an invading army.

=== Track listing ===
No.	Title	Writer(s)	Artist	Length
1.	"Can't Help Falling in Love"	Hugo Peretti, Luigi Creatore, George David Weiss	Evan Rachel Wood and Sam Palladio	2:53
2.	"I'll Never Fall in Love Again"	Burt Bacharach, Hal David	Evan Rachel Wood	2:48
3.	"Three Little Birds"	Bob Marley	Elijah Kelley and Meredith Anne Bull	2:46
4.	"I Wanna Dance with Somebody (Who Loves Me)"	George Merrill, Shannon Rubicam	Marius De Vries	1:00
5.	"C'mon Marianne / Stronger (What Doesn't Kill You)"	L. Russell Brown, Raymond Bloodworth / Kelly Clarkson, Jörgen Elofsson, Ali Tamposi, David Gamson, Greg Kurstin	Evan Rachel Wood and Sam Palladio	3:32
6.	"Trouble"	Jerry Leiber, Mike Stoller	Alan Cumming	2:32
7.	"Love Is Strange"	Bo Diddley	Kristin Chenoweth	2:53
8.	"Say Hey"	Michael Franti, Carl Young	Elijah Kelley	3:04
9.	"Mistreated"	Ritchie Blackmore, David Coverdale	Alan Cumming	2:30
10.	"I Can't Help Myself (Sugar Pie Honey Bunch)"	Holland–Dozier–Holland	Meredith Anne Bull	3:05
11.	"Straight On"	Ann Wilson, Nancy Wilson, Sue Ennis	Alan Cumming And Evan Rachel Wood	3:06
12.	"Strange Magic"	Jeff Lynne	Alan Cumming And Evan Rachel Wood	4:15
13.	"Tell Him / Wild Thing"	Bert Berns / Chip Taylor	Alan Cumming, Evan Rachel Wood, Maya Rudolph, Meredith Anne Bull	3:40
Total length:				38:04

== Release ==
=== Box office ===
Strange Magic was released on January 23, 2015. During its opening weekend in the United States and Canada, it grossed $5.5 million across 3,020 theaters, debuting at number seven. It had the lowest ticket sales of any animated film released in over 3,000 theaters. The previous animated films with the lowest opening weekend gross are The Wild Thornberrys Movie (2002) and Quest for Camelot (1998). The film closed on April 16, 2015, and had earned $12,429,583 in the domestic box office, with $1,173,870 overseas for a worldwide total of $13,603,453. With an estimated budget of $70–$100 million. Strange Magic was considered by analysts to be a box-office bomb, resulting in a loss for Disney of an estimated $40–50 million.

=== Home media ===
Strange Magic was released by Touchstone Home Entertainment on DVD and digital download on May 19, 2015 in the United States and on DVD on August 12, 2015 in Australia. The DVD release includes two behind-the-scenes featurettes.

== Reception ==
=== Critical response ===
On Rotten Tomatoes, the film holds an approval rating of 19%, based on 59 reviews, with an average rating of 3.8/10. The website's critical consensus states, "Like most modern animated movies, Strange Magic is lovely to look at; unfortunately, there isn't much going on beneath the surface." On Metacritic, the film has a score of 25 out of 100, based on 20 critics, indicating "generally unfavorable" reviews. Audiences polled by CinemaScore gave the film an average grade of "B−" on an A+ to F scale.

Alonso Duralde of The Wrap gave a negative review, writing "That terrible character design, combined with a painful lack of laughs and a crushing plethora of ghastly songs, makes Strange Magic perhaps the worst animated feature ever to come out of Disney." Conversely, Drew Taylor of Indiewire gave the film a B−, stating, "Strange Magic does manage to enchant you (mostly) with its oddball charm." Justin Chang of Variety gave the film a negative review, saying "This noisy, unappealing children's fantasy fails to distinguish itself among January's many, many reasons to steer clear of the multiplex." Alan Scherstuhl of The Village Voice described Strange Magic as "the best Lucas film in 25 years: funny, idiosyncratic, hippy-dippy, packed with creatures and visions worth beholding." Michael Rechtshaffen of The Hollywood Reporter called the film "A shrill, garish hodgepodge of familiar elements from other animated vehicles (most evidently 2013's Epic), there's virtually nothing about this forced, fractured fairy tale that feels remotely fresh or involving." Michael Ordoña of the San Francisco Chronicle gave the film one out of four stars, saying "The plot movement feels very much like an unpleasant formality, shoved forward by tiresome devices." Claudia Puig of USA Today gave the film two out of four stars, saying "Strange Magic is strange all right, but hardly magical." Jesse Hassenger of The A.V. Club gave the film a B, saying "The movie maintains its own level of oddball invention that at least feels pleasantly removed from the grind of big-studio cartoon manufacturing." Rafer Guzman of Newsday gave the film one out of four stars, saying "A noxious cauldron of ingredients that shouldn't have been mixed: fairies, Shakespeare, and classic rock."

Betsy Sharkey of the Los Angeles Times gave the film a negative review, saying "Strange Magic, the new animated musical fairy tale from the mind and the mixtape of George Lucas, is indeed strange. What's missing is the magic." Ben Kenigsberg of The New York Times gave the film a negative review, saying "Said to be inspired by A Midsummer Night's Dream, the film plays more like Avatar scored to a karaoke competition." Bilge Ebiri of New York magazine gave the film a negative review, saying "The problem with Strange Magic isn't so much its derivative story as it is the odd, half-complete way it unfolds. You can sense the weird mixture of tones, influences, ideas—as if the whole thing were still in its planning stages." Glenn Kenny of RogerEbert.com gave the film one and a half stars out of four, saying "Strange Magic is essentially a jukebox musical so song-laden as to practically be an operetta, and the songs are so eclectic that they never quite fit into the movie's flying-insect world, which is divided into dark and light forests." Keith Phipps of The Dissolve gave the film one and a half stars out of five, saying "Strange Magic certainly isn't an ordinary sort of mess, and the personal nature of the project is still evident in the finished film."

== Accolades ==
Rudolph received a nomination for Best Voice Performance at the Black Reel Awards of 2016.
