= Blueberry Inn =

- Directed by: Sonia Guggenheim
- Written by: Sonia Guggenheim
- Produced by: Hadley Greswold; Katrina Kudlick
- Starring: Jack Davenport; Sophia Di Martino; Florence Hall; Michael Maloney
- Production companies: Dancing Fox Entertainment; Fever Dream Studios
- Distributed by: Dancing Fox Entertainment; Blueberry Inn Ltd.
- Release date: 12 March 2027 (United Kingdom)
- Running time: 89 minutes
- Countries: United Kingdom; United States
- Language: English

Blueberry Inn is an upcoming satirical comedy film written and directed by Sonia Guggenheim and starring Jack Davenport, Sophia Di Martino, Florence Hall and Michael Maloney.

== Premise ==
Blueberry Inn follows an emotionally-stunted butler who is inexplicably gifted a broken-down inn from his lord and is tasked with uniting three chaotic employees and a cheeky pig against the heirs' attempts to bankrupt the inn.

== Cast ==
- Jack Davenport
- Sophia Di Martino
- Michael Maloney
- Florence Hall
- Jonathan Oldfield
- Alexander Arnold
- Ace Bhatti
- Chloe Lea

== Production ==
The film is written and directed by Sonia Guggenheim and produced by Katrina Kudlick for Fever Dream Studios and Hadley Greswold of Dancing Fox Entertainment.

The cast is led by Jack Davenport and also includes Sophia Di Martino, Michael Maloney, Florence Hall, Jonathan Oldfield, Alexander Arnold, Ace Bhatti and Chloe Lea.

Principal photography began in Yorkshire in May 2025 with filming locations including Castle Howard, near Malton, North Yorkshire, as well as York city centre.

== Release ==
The film is scheduled to be released in the United Kingdom on 12 March 2027.
