= Ricky Norwood =

English actor (born 1983)

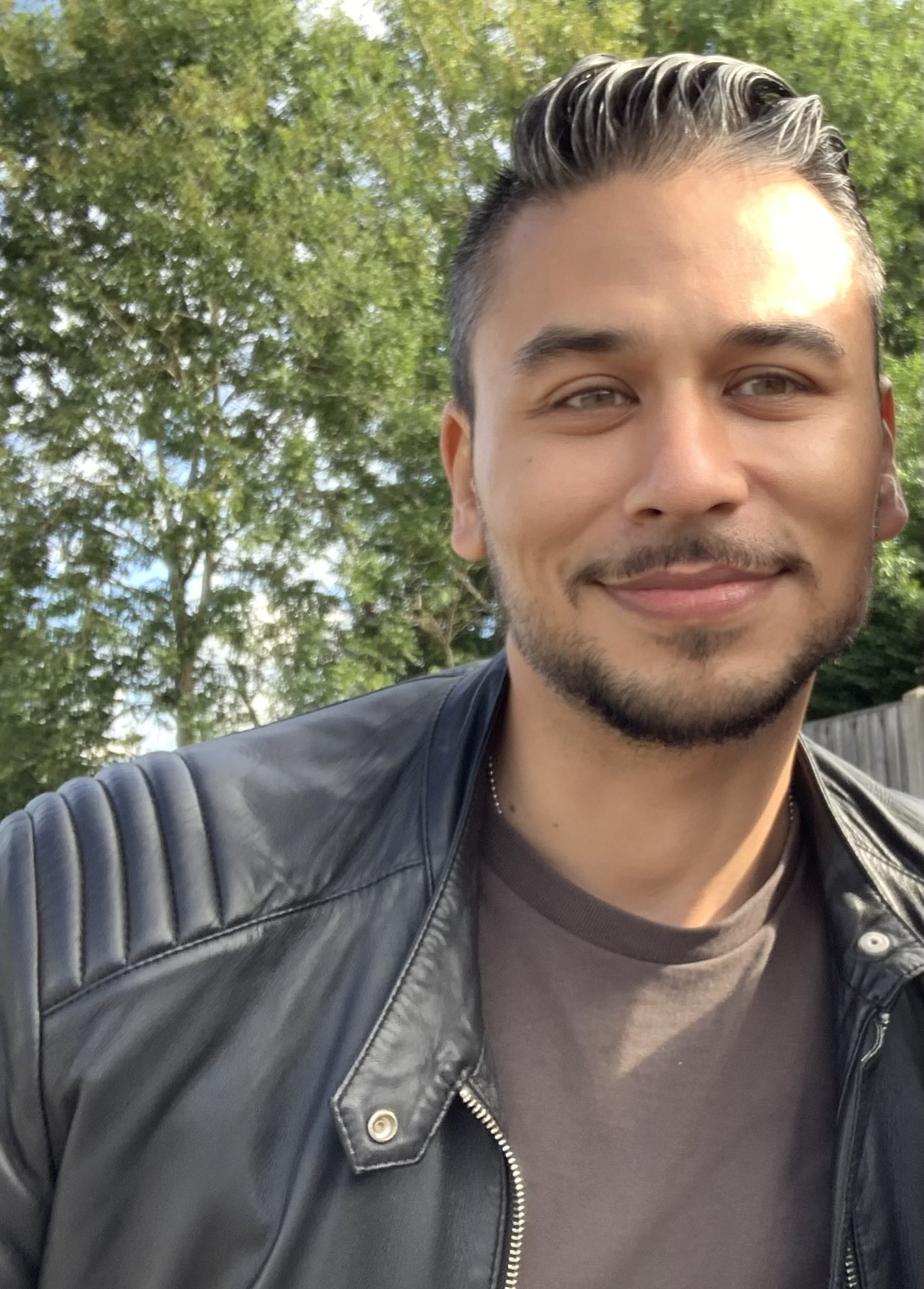
- Norwood in 2022
- Born: Richard James Saggar; 26 April 1983 (age 43); Forest Gate, London, England
- Occupation: Actor
- Years active: 2009–present
- Television: EastEnders; EastEnders: E20; Celebrity Big Brother; Dancing on Ice

Ricky James Norwood (né Saggar; born 26 April 1983) is a British actor from London, known for playing Fatboy in the BBC One soap opera EastEnders (2010–2015, 2023) and its online spin-off EastEnders: E20 (2010–2011). Following his initial exit from the soap, Norwood appeared as a housemate on the eighteenth series of Celebrity Big Brother in 2016 and finished as the runner-up. He has also competed in the sixteenth series of Dancing on Ice in 2024.

== Early life ==
Norwood was born Ricky James Saggar on 26 April 1983 in Forest Gate, Newham in London to an English father and a Kenyan-Indian mother. He lives in Wanstead. From the age of 12, he attended the Theatre Royal Stratford East's Youth Theatre and also studied Performing Arts at Barking College. With friends, Norwood started a production company, writing, producing and starring in five original productions which were performed at the Theatre Royal Stratford.

== Career ==
Norwood's theatre credits include Daddy Cool at Shaftesbury Theatre, Sick at the Almeida Theatre and The Stones at the Royal National Theatre.

=== EastEnders ===
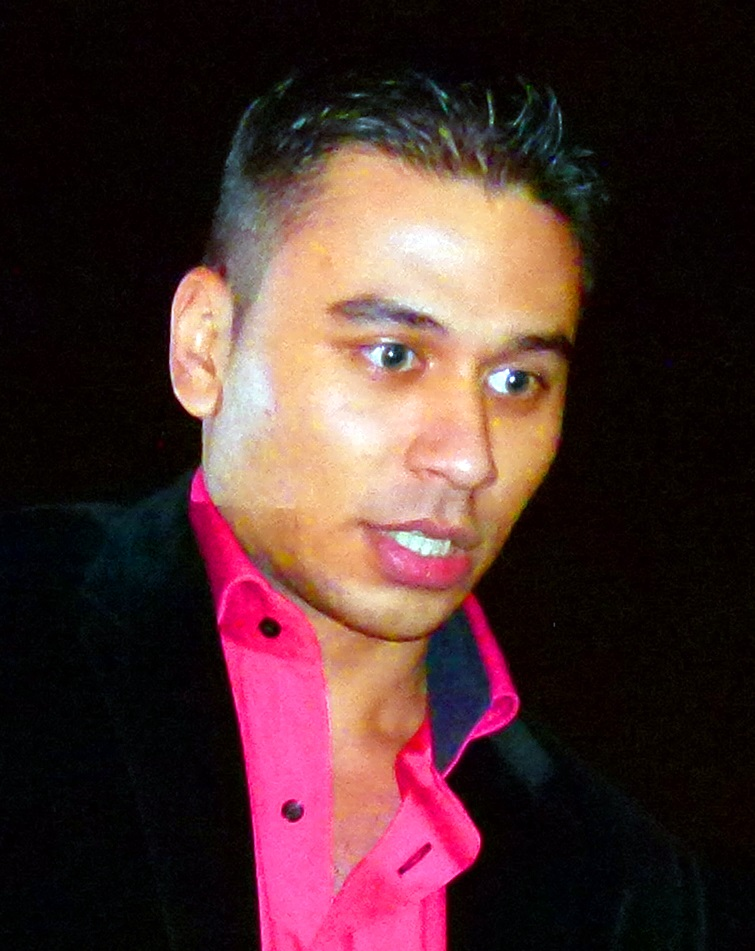
Norwood at the 17th National Television Awards in January 2012

In 2009, Norwood was cast in the EastEnders internet spin-off series EastEnders: E20 as Fatboy. Norwood said of his casting: "I am so excited to be on the show. It's an honour to now be part of a show that has been on in my house for as long as I have been alive. I am born and bred in the East End—a stone's throw from the real Albert Square. It feels like a homecoming. I love being part of a cast that feels like family and can't wait to have a scene in The Vic." In the run-up to the series, Norwood also appeared in EastEnders for two episodes, and after EastEnders: E20's first series ended, Fatboy became a regular character in EastEnders. Fatboy was called one of the most popular new characters in the show and Norwood won Most Popular Newcomer at the 16th National Television Awards in 2011. Norwood went on to appear in series 2 and 3 of EastEnders: E20 as Fatboy, and has appeared in the spin-offs "East Street" and All I Want for Christmas.

In March 2014, a video surfaced of Norwood reportedly smoking cannabis and performing a sex act during a Skype chat, captured by a woman he had met online. On 1 April, after meeting with BBC and EastEnders bosses, he was suspended from the soap for two months. An EastEnders spokesperson said: "Ricky Norwood has been suspended from the show for a period of two months with immediate effect. In addition, Ricky would like to apologise to EastEnders' viewers for any offence caused and for bringing the show into disrepute." On 16 October 2015, it was announced that Norwood had been axed from EastEnders after nearly six years in the role of Fatboy, after show bosses chose to write the character out. Norwood filmed his final scenes later that month and producers chose to keep details surrounding Fatboy's exit under wraps. A show spokesperson said, "We can confirm that Ricky will be leaving EastEnders. We wish him all the best for the future", whilst a show insider commented: "Ricky is a great guy and very popular on set. He's leaving the show as it's the end of Fatboy's storyline, but everyone wishes him well for the future."

His last on-screen appearance was on 24 December 2015, and it transpired that the character was killed off-screen when crushed in the boot of a car. In August 2023, Norwood made a cameo appearance as Fatboy in a flashback episode surrounding the return of Cindy Beale (Michelle Collins).

=== Other work ===
In 2013, Norwood appeared on Pointless Celebrities and Sweat the Small Stuff. He also took part in the 2013 Christmas special of Strictly Come Dancing, and was paired with professional dancer Janette Manrara.

Norwood's first role after leaving EastEnders was as a "vile, violent homophobe" in Marty Ross's audio drama Romeo and Jude, a gay adaptation of Romeo and Juliet.

From 2016 to 2018, Norwood regularly appeared as a panellist on the Big Brother companion show, Big Brother's Bit on the Side. In July 2016, Norwood became a housemate on the eighteenth series of Celebrity Big Brother. He finished the series as runner-up behind Stephen Bear. In 2020, Norwood appeared as Reggie in the Netflix film The Princess Switch: Switched Again. The following year, he reprised his role for the sequel The Princess Switch 3: Romancing the Star. In 2024, Norwood appeared as a contestant on the sixteenth series of Dancing on Ice. He was paired with Annette Dytrt and was sixth to be eliminated.

He has a role in upcoming Christmas film Jingle All the Slay.

== Personal life ==
Norwood is a fan of Tottenham Hotspur football club.

== Filmography ==
Year	Title	Role	Notes	Ref.
2010–2015, 2023	EastEnders	Arthur "Fatboy" Chubb	Regular role	
2010−2011	EastEnders: E20	Arthur "Fatboy" Chubb	Regular role	
2010	East Street	Arthur "Fatboy" Chubb	Charity crossover between Coronation Street and EastEnders	
2012	All I Want for Christmas	Arthur "Fatboy" Chubb	EastEnders spin-off	
2013	Tamwar Tales – The Life of an Assistant Market Inspector	Arthur "Fatboy" Chubb	EastEnders spin-off	
2013	Strictly Come Dancing	Contestant	2013 Christmas special	
2015–2018	Big Brother's Bit on the Side	Himself	Regular panellist	
2016	Celebrity Big Brother	Himself	Contestant; series 18	
2020	The Princess Switch: Switched Again	Reggie	Film role	
2021	The Princess Switch 3: Romancing the Star	Reggie	Film role	
2024	Dancing on Ice	Himself	Contestant; series 16	

== Awards and nominations ==
Year	Award	Category	Result	Ref.
2010	Inside Soap Awards	Best Newcomer	Won	
2010	TV Quick Awards	Best Soap Newcomer	Shortlisted	
2011	National Television Awards	Newcomer	Won	
2011	The British Soap Awards	Best Newcomer	Nominated	
2012	Inside Soap Awards	Funniest Male	Won	
2012	Black International Film Festival and Music Video & Screen Awards	Best Newcomer	Nominated	
2013	Screen Nation Awards	Young Shooting Star (16-25)	Nominated	
2013	British Soap Awards	Best Comedy Performance	Nominated	
2013	Inside Soap Awards	Funniest Male	Shortlisted	
