= Douglas Bernheim =

American professor of economics

B. Douglas Bernheim
- Born: 1958 (age 67–68)

Academic background
- Education: Harvard University; Massachusetts Institute of Technology
- Doctoral advisor: Franklin M. Fisher

Academic work
- Discipline: Economics
- Institutions: Stanford University; Northwestern University; Princeton University
- Website: Information at IDEAS / RePEc

B. Douglas Bernheim (born 1958) is an American economics professor, and currently the Edward Ames Edmunds Professor of Economics at Stanford University; his previous academic appointments have included an endowed chair in Economics and Business Policy at Princeton University and an endowed chair in Insurance and Risk Management at Northwestern University’s J.L. Kellogg Graduate School of Management, Department of Finance. He has published articles in academic journals, and has received a number of awards recognizing his contributions to the field of economics. He is a partner with Bates White, an economic consulting firm with offices in Washington, D.C., and San Diego.

== Early life and education ==
Bernheim was born in 1958. From 1975 to 1979, he studied at Harvard University, where he received a Bachelor of Arts (AB), summa cum laude. In 1982, he received his PhD in economics from the Massachusetts Institute of Technology.

== Career ==
From 1982 to 1987, he was an assistant professor and in 1987 and 1988 an associate professor at Stanford University. Bernheim moved to Northwestern University to serve as the Harold J. Hines Jr. Distinguished Professor of Risk Management (1988–1990) and later moved to Princeton University (1990–1994) to serve as the John L. Weinberg Professor of Economics and Business Policy. Since 1994 he has worked again at Stanford University: From 1994 to 2005 as the Lewis and Virginia Eaton Professor and since 2005 as the Edward Ames Edmonds Professor of Economics. Since 1986, he has also conducted research for the National Bureau of Economic Research.

Bernheim works in the fields of finance, industrial organization, political economy, behavioral economics, and microeconomics. His sister is Robin Bernheim, the noted writer/producer of many TV shows, including Remington Steele, Quantum Leap, Star Trek: Voyager, and When Calls the Heart.

=== Awards and affiliations ===
- 1978: Phi Beta Kappa
- 1979: John H. Williams Prize (for best graduate in economics)
- 1991: Elected Fellow, Econometric Society
- 1997: Elected Fellow, American Academy of Arts and Sciences
- 2001–2002: Fellow, Center for Advanced Study in the Behavioral Sciences
- 2001–2002: John Simon Guggenheim Memorial Foundation Fellowship

== Publications ==
=== Articles ===
- Bernheim, Douglas; Rangel, Antonio (2008). "Behavioural public economics". The New Palgrave Journal of Economics (2). London: 1–6. doi:10.1057/9780230226203.0119. ISBN 978-0-333-78676-5.
- Bernheim, Douglas (2010). "Behavioral Welfare Economics". Panoeconomicus. 57 (1): 123–151. doi:10.2298/PAN1002123B.
- The Vanishing Nest Egg. Reflections on Saving in America. Twentieth Century Fund/Priority Press, New York 1991, ISBN 0-87078-313-0
- John B. Shoven; B. Douglas Bernheim (15 February 2009). National Saving and Economic Performance. University of Chicago Press. ISBN 978-0-226-04435-4.
