= Matthias Lebeer =

Belgian film, television and commercial director

- Education: RITS School of Arts; FAMU; Institut des Arts de Diffusion
- Occupations: Film, television and commercial director
- Website: matthiaslebeer.com

Matthias Lebeer is a Belgian film, television and commercial director. His short film Brod Ludaka was shortlisted for an Academy Award in 2008. His later television work includes the Belgian series This Is Not a Murder Mystery, based on an original idea by Lebeer and Christophe Dirickx.

== Early life and education ==
Lebeer is from Antwerp, Belgium. He studied film directing at the RITS School of Arts in Brussels and spent part of his studies at the Film and TV School of the Academy of Performing Arts in Prague (FAMU).

Production Paradise states that Lebeer received an MA in film direction from RITS and later completed a film production course at the Institut des Arts de Diffusion (IAD). His studies at FAMU influenced the development of his graduation film Brod Ludaka, which was shot in Sarajevo, Bosnia and Herzegovina.

== Career ==
Lebeer's graduation project, Brod Ludaka, was shortlisted for an Academy Award in 2008 after he won Best Director at the Athens International Film and Video Festival in Ohio.

In the same period he directed a commercial for Textappeal, which was presented at the Cannes Lions. He subsequently worked as a director of advertising films and television commercials.

Lebeer has directed commercials for brands including Google, Nespresso, McDonald's, Star Alliance, Samsung, McLaren, Nissan and Volvo. His advertising work has received awards including two Gold Cannes Lions and Silver and Bronze awards at the 2016 EVCOM Screen Awards.

His narrative work includes the short film Alan, which was supported by the BFI and IdeasTap. He also directed the winning music video for Mark Knopfler's song "Wherever I Go".

Lebeer later moved into long-form television. In 2022, This Is Not a Murder Mystery was selected for the Berlinale Co-Pro Series. The project was based on an original idea by Lebeer and Christophe Dirickx, with Hans Herbots and Lebeer named as directors.

The six-part series, created by Christophe Dirickx and Paul Baeten, is set in the 1930s and features fictionalised versions of Surrealist artists including René Magritte and Salvador Dalí. Cineuropa described it during production as being directed by Herbots and Lebeer and based on the original idea by Dirickx and Lebeer. Lebeer co-directed episodes three and four.

The series was produced by Panenka and Deadpan Pictures and was completed in 2025. Its first two episodes had their world premiere at Film Fest Gent in 2025. The first episode was subsequently presented at CANNESERIES, where Lebeer participated in a discussion about the programme and was credited for the original idea alongside Dirickx.

=== Filmography ===
- This Is Not a Murder Mystery (2025) – television series; original idea, co-director of episodes 3 and 4
- Alan (2016)
- Wherever I Go by Mark Knopfler (2015)
- Nissan GT Academy (2014)
- GT Academy Europe (2012–2013)
- Brod Ludaka (2006)

== Awards and nominations ==
- EVCOM Screen Awards, Silver and Bronze for Atelier Nespresso (2016)
- Talenthouse Award and The Smalls Music Video Award for Mark Knopfler's Wherever I Go (2015)
- Cannes Lions, Gold for Best Use of Branded Content for GT Academy (2012)
- Cannes Lions, Gold for Best Use of Branded Content for GT Academy (2011)
- Academy Award shortlist for Brod Ludaka (2008)
- Best Director, Athens International Film and Video Festival, Ohio, USA (2007)
