= Bearbrick (TV series) =

- Genre: Comedy; Musical
- Based on: Bearbrick by MediCom Toy
- Developed by: Meghan McCarthy
- Showrunner: Megan McCarthy
- Voices of: Brianna Bryan; Noah Bentley; Isaiah Crews; Skyla I'Lece; Alison Jaye
- Music by: Jina Hyojin An & Shirley Song
- Opening theme: "Paint Your Own Destiny" by The Brushstrokes
- Countries of origin: United States; Japan
- Original language: English
- No. of seasons: 1
- No. of episodes: 13

Production
- Executive producers: Meghan McCarthy; Narutaka Sato; Tempei Shikama
- Running time: 21−23 minutes
- Production companies: DreamWorks Animation Television; Dentsu Entertainment

Original release
- Network: Apple TV+
- Release: March 21, 2025

Bearbrick (stylized as BE@RBRICK) is an animated musical comedy television series produced by DreamWorks Animation Television and Dentsu Entertainment for Apple TV+. The series was developed by Meghan McCarthy and is based on the brand of collectible designer toys of the same name by MediCom Toy. It was released on March 21, 2025.

== Premise ==
In a world where every Bearbrick's role is chosen of their painted look, Jasmine Finch and her friends pursue their dream of music and help others do the same difference.

== Cast ==
=== Main ===
- Brianna Bryan as Jasmine Finch
- Noah Bentley as Klaus Nightshade
- Isaiah Crews as Nick Hazard
- Skyla I'Lece as Holly Honeywell
- Alison Jaye as Ada Goodall

=== Recurring ===
- Tim Meadows as Mr. Hitmaker
- Nick Wolfhard as Todd
- Zeke Alton as Jasmine's Dad
- Zehra Fazal as Jasmine's Mom
- Emily Hampshire as Janet
- Ego Nwodim as Charlene
- Katy Mixon as Ms. Goldenshorts
- Debra Jo Rupp as Miss Milton
- Jentel Hawkins as Chordata
- Alexis Nelis as Vanessa Van Bjorn
- Timbaland as BRBX Media DJ
- Artt Butler as Klaus' Dad
- Kaitlyn Robrock as Klaus' Mom

== Episodes ==
No.	Title	Directed by	Written by	Storyboard by	Original release date
1	"Welcome to Vinylville"	Alex Almaguer	Meghan McCarthy	Lake Fama, Amy Mai and Kathryn Marusik	March 21, 2025
2	"That Takes the Cake"	Adam Gunn	Megan McCarthy	Regine Clarke, Aaron Davies, Jen Tuyet Ta and Ian Young	March 21, 2025
3	"Ring and Sing"	Adam Gunn	Megan McCarthy	Aaron Davies, Maruna Hada, Jen Tuyet Ta and Ian Young	March 21, 2025
4	"I Hope You Dance, Mom"	Adam Gunn	Taylor Orci	Maruna Hada, Tang Lee, Ryan McKone, Ian Milne and Jess Zhuang	March 21, 2025
5	"Good at Being Bad"	Steve Trenbirth and Kevin Wotton	Ellie Guzman	Manny Banados, Jess Zhuang, Gener Ocampo and Ian Milne	March 21, 2025
6	"The Play's the Thing"	Mandy Clotworthy	Ed Lee	Manuk Chang, Aaron Davies, Ryan McKone and Hayden Morris	March 21, 2025
7	"The Third Option"	Adam Gunn	Dimitry Pompée	Maruna Hada, Ryan McKone and Tang Lee	March 21, 2025
8	"Mission Im-pose-able"	Kevin Wotton	Ami Boghani	Jess Zhuang, Gener Ocampo, Ian Milne and Rachel Mackey	March 21, 2025
9	"Band Nerves, Take a Swerve"	Mandy Clotworthy	Andi Shu Hester	Hayden Morris, Manny Banados and Darwin Tan	March 21, 2025
10	"An Announcement of an Announcement"	Adam Gunn	Jen Rivas-DeLoose	Maruna Hada, Ryan McKone and Tang Lee	March 21, 2025
11	"DMBEETHZ"	Kevin Wotton	Paynudeh Allen	Jessica Zhuang, Gener Ocampo and Rachel Mackey	March 21, 2025
12	"The Ballad of Ms. Goldenshorts"	Mandy Clotworthy	Taylor Orci	Hayden Morris, Manny Banados and Darwin Tan	March 21, 2025
13	"Vinylville 2.0"	Adam Gunn	Meghan McCarthy	Ryan McKone, Maruna Hada, Tang Lee and Ian Young	March 21, 2025

== Production ==
In 2017 or 2018, Dentsu and DreamWorks Animation Television have been making an agreement to develop a CGI TV series based on the popular collectible figures. The series was ordered by Apple TV+ in April 2023 with 13 episodes.

With the announcement of the release date, it includes the cast of the series, starring Brianna Bryan, Skyla I'Lece, Isaiah Crews, Alison Jaye and Noah Bentley. With Tim Meadows, Nick Wolfhard, Emily Hampshire, Ego Nwodim, Katy Mixon and Debra Jo Rupp guest starring including Timbaland.

== Music ==
Timbaland is the executive music producer and has written original songs for the series, with Jina Hyojin An and Shirley Song composed the music. The soundtrack was released on March 21, 2025, along with the series. Available on any music streaming platforms.

BE@RBRICK, Season 1 (Apple TV+ Original Series Soundtrack)

Soundtrack album
- Released: March 21, 2025
- Genre: Soundtrack
- Length: 20:00
- Label: Lakeshore Records
- Producer: Timbaland

No.	Title	Artist(s)	Length
1.	"Rise Up"	The Brushstrokes	1:50
2.	"Life is Sweeter"	The Brushstrokes	1:29
3.	"Multiply"	The Brushstrokes	1:05
4.	"Can't Keep Me (From Dancing)"	The Brushstrokes	1:49
5.	"Just Comply"	DMBEETZ	1:08
6.	"Conformity is da Bomb"	Vanessa Van Bjorn	0:48
7.	"Paint Outside the Lines"	Vanessa Van Bjorn	2:47
8.	"You Get What You Get (And Don't Throw a Fit)"	Vanessa Van Bjorn	0:48
9.	"A Heartbeat Away"	The Brushstrokes	1:04
10.	"Embrace the Paint (Reprise)"	DMBEETZ & Holly Honeywell	1:59
11.	"Don't You Be (A Sneaky Kid)"	The Vanessas	1:17
12.	"Paint Your Own Destiny"	The Brushstrokes	2:51
13.	"BE@RBRICK Score Suite"	Jina Hyojin An & Shirley Song	2:08

== Release ==
Bearbrick was released on Apple TV+ on March 21, 2025.
