= Nick Sagar =

British actor (born 1988)

- Born: Nicholas Dewan Sagar; 7 January 1988 (age 38); London, England, U.K.
- Occupation: Actor
- Years active: 2009–present
- Relatives: Sean Sagar (brother)

Nicholas Dewan Sagar (born 7 January 1988) is a British actor and model. He is known for roles on television series Queen of the South and The Haves and the Have Nots, and for playing Kevin Richards in the romantic comedy trilogy, The Princess Switch. He stars and produces the upcoming action comedy The Holiday Hitman.

== Life and career ==
Sagar was born and raised in London, England. He is of Jamaican and Guyanese descent. In an interview for Timid Magazine, he said: "I loved being mixed race growing up. I think you’re right in saying I saw myself as whole rather than half. I just thought I am Black. I am Indian. I fully embraced both heritages, which was a cool thing because I could relate to everyone." He has a younger brother, Sean, who is also an actor. Sagar made his debut on British television in 2009 and later moved to Los Angeles, making his first U.S. appearance in an episode of NCIS: Los Angeles. He made his big screen debut appearing in the 2012 crime drama film, Ill Manors.

In 2017, Sagar was cast as Detective Alonzo Loya in the USA Network crime drama series, Queen of the South (he left the series after two seasons). That same year, he joined the cast of Oprah Winfrey Network prime time soap opera, The Haves and the Have Nots as Charles Frederickson, the new love interest for Candace Young (Tika Sumpter). Sagar was a regular cast member from season 4 to season 7 and returned in a recurring basis for the show's eighth and final season. Additionally in 2017, he had the recurring role of Victor Aldertree during the second season of Freeform's Shadowhunters. In 2019, Sagar guest-starred in two episodes of The CW's Supergirl as Rip Roar.

In 2018, Sagar starred opposite Vanessa Hudgens in the romantic comedy film, The Princess Switch for Netflix. He returned to the role in its sequels, The Princess Switch: Switched Again (2020) and The Princess Switch 3: Romancing the Star (2021). From 2021 to 2023, Sagar had a recurring role in the Starz comedy series, Run the World. In 2024, he starred in the erotic thriller film, Mea Culpa, by Tyler Perry.

== Filmography ==
=== Film ===
Year	Title	Role	Notes
2009	Just Like Family	Tony	Short film
2010	S.N.U.B!	Security Officer	
2012	Ill Manors	Marcell	
2014	Wasteman Diaries	Nathan	Short film
2018	The Princess Switch	Kevin Richards	
2020	The Princess Switch: Switched Again	Kevin Richards	
2021	The Princess Switch 3: Romancing the Star	Kevin Richards	
2024	Mea Culpa	Ray Hawthorne	
2026	The Holiday Hitman	Hank Carter	Also producer
TBA	I Don't Want to Drink Your Blood Anymore	Douglas	Post-production

=== Television ===
Year	Title	Role	Notes
2009	Gunrush	Gang Member	Television film
2011	NCIS: Los Angeles	Joseph	Episode: "Higher Power"
2014	Holby City	Joel Wallis	Episode: "The Cruellest Month"
2015	Hank Zipzer	Alex Broman	2 episodes
2017–2018	Queen of the South	Detective Alonzo Loya	Series regular, 26 episodes
2017–2019	Shadowhunters	Victor Aldertree	Recurring role, 9 episodes
2017–2021	The Haves and the Have Nots	Charles Frederickson	Series regular (seasons 4–7), recurring (season 8)
2019	Supergirl	Russell Rogers / Rip Roar	2 episodes
2020–2022	Borrasca	Officer Ramirez	Poscast series, 6 episodes
2021–2023	Run the World	Anderson	Recurring role, 7 episodes
2025	The Irrational	Logan Rajesh	Episode: "The Exchange"
