= Mark Fleischmann =

English actor (born 1972)

- Born: 31 January 1972 (age 54); Hampstead Garden Suburb, London, England
- Education: Royal Central School of Speech and Drama
- Occupation: Actor
- Years active: 2001–present
- Children: 1

Mark Fleischmann (born 31 January 1972) is an English actor.

== Background ==
Mark Fleischmann was born in 1972 and grew up in Hampstead Garden Suburb. After graduating from the Central School of Speech and Drama in London, Fleischmann appeared in several films, television series and theater plays. His acting career began in Edinburgh, where he played a hyena in the Lion King musical. After it he organised and ran comedy club nights in British pubs. In 2008, Fleischmann played a main role in The Collector, which was shown at the Arcola Theatre in London. In 2010, he played the recurring character Lloyd Pinky in the TV series Being Human and fronted the Being Human website. In 2011, he produced his own show which could be seen at The Enterprise in London. In 2013, he played a main role in the theater play Marriage at the Belgrade Theatre. From 2012–2017, he portrayed the recurring character Mr. Jeffries in the British television series Wolfblood.

== Filmography ==
=== Film ===
Year	Title	Role	Note(s)
2008	Horrorshow		
2008	The Flea		
2010	Inception	Penrose Sub Con	
2010	Today Is Friday	3rd Soldier	
2010	Workhorse	John	
2011	Pickle	Ringo	
2016	Dark Heart AKA Wagstaffe	Ray Collins	
2017	Time Will Tell	Officer Roberts	
2018	The Princess Switch	Frank De Luca	
2020	The Princess Switch: Switched Again	Frank De Luca	
2021	Infinite	Brasserie Owner	
2021	The Princess Switch 3: Romancing the Star	Frank De Luca	
2021	A Castle for Christmas	Frank De Luca	
2022	Enola Holmes 2	Stage Manager	
2026	The Holiday Hitman	Father McDougall	

=== Television ===
Year	Title	Role	Note(s)
2001	Fun at the Funeral Parlour	P.C. Boone	Episode: The Jaws of Doom
2010	Being Human	Technician	7 episodes
2012	Dark Matters: Twisted But True	Thomas McMonigle, Reszo	2 episodes
2012–2017	Wolfblood	Mr. Jeffries	43 episodes
2015	Doctors	Terry Doolan	Episode: The Man Who Was King
2016	Stan Lee's Lucky Man	Liev Solomans	Episode: Evil Eye
2016	The Five	Dean Frankel	Episode 2
2016	Wolfblood Secrets	Mr. Jeffries	Episode: History
2018	Unforgotten	Rob	1 episode
2018	Coronation Street	Prosecution Barrister	4 episodes
2019	Doctors	Barney Adams	1 episode
2023	Father Brown	Jeremy Sanford	Episode: The Show Must Go On

=== Web series ===
Year	Title	Role	Note(s)	Ref.
2016	Twisted Showcase	Godfrey Cavendish	Episode: Be My Head	

=== Music videos ===
Year	Title	Artist	Ref.
2014	"You Lie"	Coldrain	
