= Sam Palladio =

English actor and musician

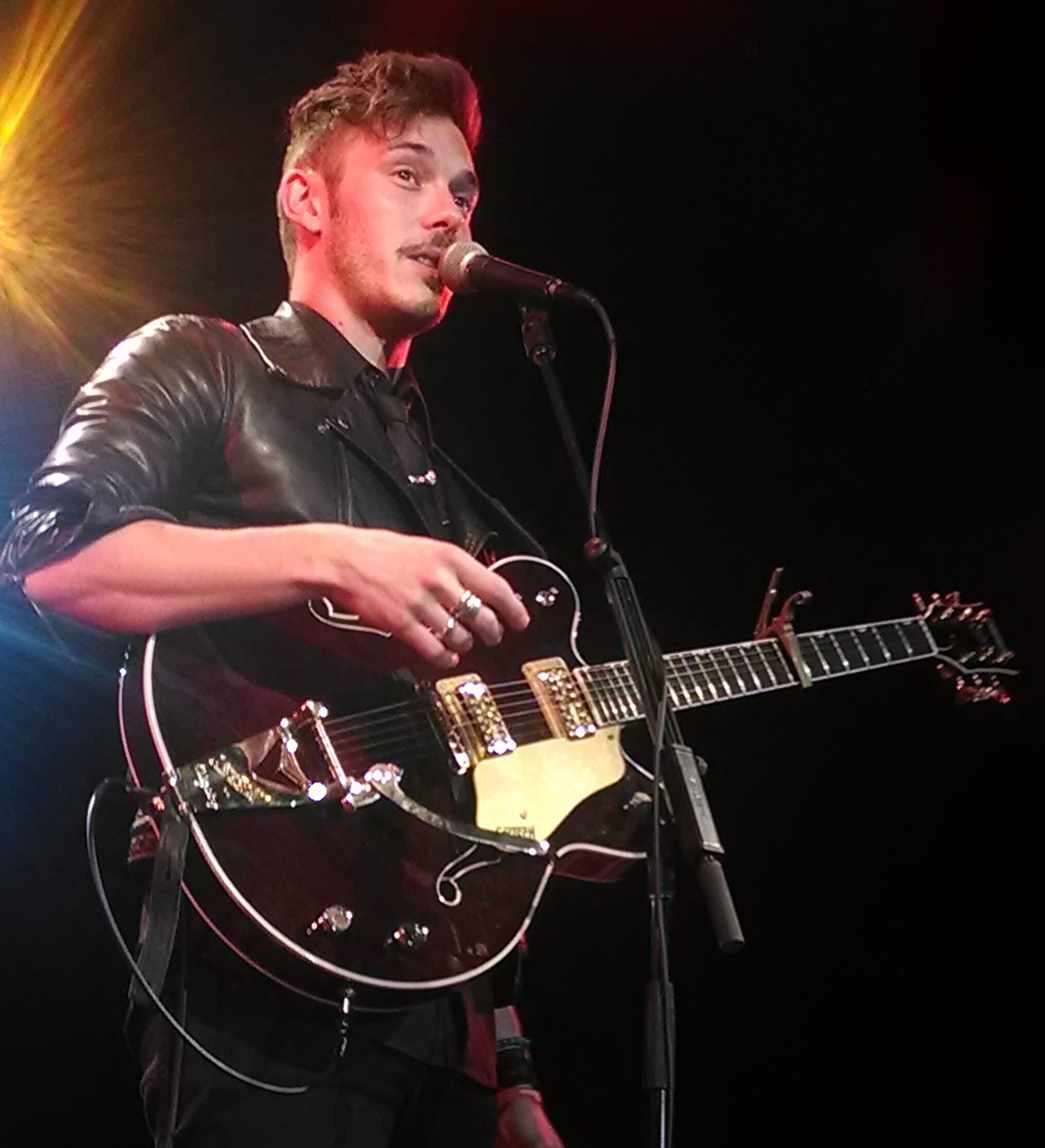
- Palladio performing in New York City, May 2014
- Born: 21 November 1986 (age 39); Pembury, Kent, England
- Education: Rose Bruford College
- Occupations: Actor, musician
- Years active: 2010–present

Sam Christian Palladio Scott (born 21 November 1986) is an English actor and musician. He is best known for his starring role as Gunnar Scott in the ABC musical drama series Nashville (2012–18). Palladio has also had recurring roles on the comedy series Episodes (2012–15) and the science fiction series Humans (2015–2018). His feature film credits include 7 Lives (2011), Runner, Runner (2013), Strange Magic (2015), The Princess Switch (2018), The Princess Switch: Switched Again (2020) and The Princess Switch 3: Romancing the Star (2021).

== Early life ==
Palladio was born in Pembury, Kent, England, UK. He was brought up by his parents, who are both artists, in Penzance, Cornwall, England. Palladio was educated at Humphry Davy School and then studied Actor Musicianship at Rose Bruford College in Sidcup, London, graduating in 2008.

== Career ==
Palladio began his career with guest starring roles in various television series, including Little Crackers, Doctors, The Hour, and Cardinal Burns. He gained further recognition for his starring role as Gunnar Scott in the ABC musical drama series Nashville. The series premiered to critical acclaim in 2012. It ended its run after six seasons in 2018. He also had a recurring role as Stoke on the comedy series Episodes between 2012 and 2015. Since 2016, he has had a recurring role as Ed in the science fiction drama series Humans.

His film credits include roles as Calvin in the British drama film 7 Lives (2011), as Shecky in the crime thriller film Runner, Runner (2013), and as Roland in the animated musical fantasy film Strange Magic (2015). He was also the lead singer in a band called Salt Water Thief. In 2020, he appeared on an episode of The Repair Shop, receiving his grandfather's RAF cap after it had been restored by the programme's experts.

== Personal life ==
Palladio was in a relationship with American musician Cassadee Pope from 2017 to 2024.

== Filmography ==
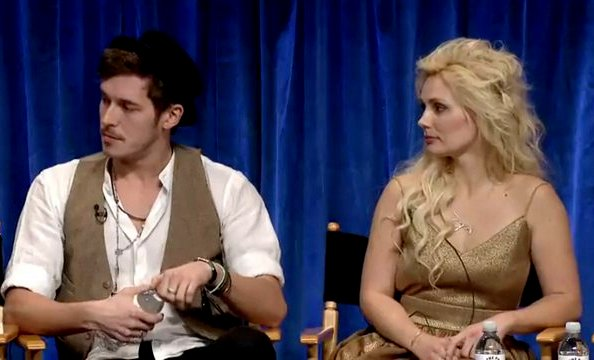
Palladio with Clare Bowen at PaleyFest 2013

=== Film ===
Year	Title	Role	Notes
2011	7 Lives	Calvin	
2013	Runner Runner	Shecky	
2015	Strange Magic	Roland (voice)	
2018	The Princess Switch	Prince Edward	
2020	The Princess Switch: Switched Again	Prince Edward	
2021	The Princess Switch 3: Romancing the Star	Prince Edward	

=== Television ===
Year	Title	Role	Notes
2010	Little Crackers	Joe Strummer	1 episode
2011	Doctors	Jamie Laker	1 episode
2011	The Hour	Rockabilly	2 episodes
2012	Cardinal Burns	Various	1 episode
2012	Walking and Talking	Fred the Ted	1 episode
2012–2015	Episodes	Stoke	10 episodes
2012–2018	Nashville	Gunnar Scott	Main role; 122 episodes
2016–2018	Humans	Ed	7 episodes
2019	Catherine the Great	Alexander Vasilchikov	1 episode
2020	The Repair Shop	Himself	1 episode
2021	Rebel	Luke	Main role
2025	The Couple Next Door	Jacob Roberts	Series 2

== Discography ==
=== Singles ===
Year	Single	Peak chart positions		Album
Year	Single	US Country	US	Album
2012	"If I Didn't Know Better" (with Clare Bowen)	27	— (Note: "If I Didn't Know Better" did not enter the Hot 100, but charted at number two on the Bubbling Under Hot 100 extension chart.)	The Music of Nashville: Season 1 Volume 1
2012	"Fade Into You" (with Clare Bowen)	25	92	The Music of Nashville: Season 1 Volume 2
2012	"I Will Fall" (with Clare Bowen)	45	—	The Music of Nashville: Season 1 Volume 2
2012	"When the Right One Comes Along"	35	—	The Music of Nashville: Season 1 Volume 1
2013	"Change Your Mind" (with Clare Bowen)	35	—	—N/a
2013	"Casino" (with Clare Bowen)	48	—	—N/a
2014	"Lately" (with Clare Bowen)	42	—	The Music of Nashville: Season 2, Volume 2
2014	"It Ain't Yours to Throw Away"	32	— (Note: "It Ain't Yours to Throw Away" did not enter the Hot 100, but charted at number 22 on the Bubbling Under Hot 100 extension chart.)	—N/a
2015	"Borrow My Heart" (with Jonathan Jackson and Clare Bowen)	— (Note: "Borrow My Heart" did not enter the Hot Country Songs, but charted at number 41 on the Country Digital Song Sales component chart.)	—	The Music of Nashville: Season 3, Volume 2
2015	"Longer" (with Clare Bowen)	— (Note: "Longer" did not enter the Hot Country Songs, but charted at number 49 on the Country Digital Song Sales component chart.)	—	The Music of Nashville: Season 3, Volume 2
2015	"I Will Never Let You Know" (with Clare Bowen)	39	—	—N/a
2015	"Wake Up When It's Over" (with Clare Bowen)	49	—	—N/a
"—" denotes releases that did not chart

=== Other appearances ===
Year	Title	Artist	Album
2017	"Stay My Love"	Una Healy	The Waiting Game
2020	"California Dreaming"	Cassadee Pope	Rise and Shine
