= Queens of Mystery =

British mystery television series

- Genre: Murder-mystery, comedy-drama
- Created by: Julian Unthank
- Written by: Julian Unthank; Matthew Thomas
- Directed by: Ian Emes
- Starring: Julie Graham; Rebecca Grant; Andrew Leung; Siobhan Redmond; Martin Trenaman; Olivia Vinall; Sarah Woodward; Michael Elcock; Florence Hall
- Country of origin: United Kingdom
- Original language: English
- No. of series: 2
- No. of episodes: 12 (6 two-part stories)

Production
- Running time: 45 minutes
- Production companies: Sly Fox Productions, Ferncroft Media

Original release
- Network: Acorn TV
- Release: 8 April 2019 – present

Queens of Mystery is a British murder-mystery comedy-drama television series created by Julian Unthank starring Julie Graham, Siobhan Redmond, Olivia Vinall (Series 1), Florence Hall (Series 2) and Sarah Woodward.

== Synopsis ==
In the first series, Vinall stars as Matilda Stone, a young detective who has been assigned to the constabulary in her fictional hometown village of Wildemarsh, England, where she is reunited with her three crime-writing aunts Cat, Beth, and Jane, played by Graham, Woodward, and Redmond. Florence Hall took over the role of Matilda Stone in Series 2.

Queens of Mystery is Acorn TV's second entirely original production. The first series was released in 2019 and comprises three separate stories, each split across two 45-minute episodes. Queens of Mystery was renewed for a second series in March 2021, which premiered on 29 November 2021.

== Cast ==
- Olivia Vinall (Series 1) and Florence Hall (Series 2) as Detective Sgt. Matilda "Mattie" Stone
- Julie Graham as Cat Stone
- Sarah Woodward as Beth Stone
- Siobhan Redmond as Jane Stone
- Andrew Leung as Dr. Daniel Lynch
- Rebecca Grant as Natasha Young
- Martin Trenaman as Inspector Derek Thorne
- Michael Elcock as Police Constable Terry Foster
- Juliet Stevenson as the narrator

=== Guest stars ===
- Selina Cadell
- Omid Djalili
- Nancy Carroll
- Chu Omambala
- Rebecca Scroggs
- Michelle Collins
- Josette Simon
- Frances Barber
- Con O'Neill
- Mark Heap

== Episodes ==
=== Series overview ===
Series	Episodes	Originally released	
Series	Episodes	First released	Last released
1	6	8 April 2019	22 April 2019
2	6	29 November 2021	13 December 2021

=== Series 1 (2019) ===
No. overall	No. in season	Title	Directed by	Written by	Original release date (U.S.)
1	1	"Murder in the Dark: First Chapter"	Ian Emes	Julian Unthank	8 April 2019
2	2	"Murder in the Dark: Final Chapter"	Ian Emes	Julian Unthank	8 April 2019
3	3	"Death by Vinyl: First Chapter"	Jamie Magnus Stone	Matthew Thomas	15 April 2019
4	4	"Death by Vinyl: Final Chapter"	Jamie Magnus Stone	Matthew Thomas	15 April 2019
5	5	"Smoke & Mirrors: First Chapter"	Ian Emes	Julian Unthank	22 April 2019
6	6	"Smoke & Mirrors: Final Chapter"	Ian Emes	Julian Unthank	22 April 2019

=== Series 2 (2021) ===
No. overall	No. in season	Title	Directed by	Written by	UK release date	U.S. release date
7	1	"Sparring with Death: First Chapter"	Ian Emes	Julian Unthank	29 November 2021	10 January 2022
8	2	"Sparring with Death: Final Chapter"	Ian Emes	Julian Unthank	29 November 2021	10 January 2022
9	3	"The Modern Art of Murder: First Chapter"	Theresa Varga	Matthew Thomas	6 December 2021	17 January 2022
10	4	"The Modern Art of Murder: Final Chapter"	Theresa Varga	Matthew Thomas	6 December 2021	17 January 2022
11	5	"The Raven: First Chapter"	Ian Emes	Julian Unthank	13 December 2021	24 January 2022
12	6	"The Raven: Final Chapter"	Ian Emes	Julian Unthank	13 December 2021	24 January 2022

== Home media ==
DVD releases
Season	Region 1	Region 2	Region 4
1	October 29, 2019	November 29, 2021	April 1, 2020
2	April 26, 2022	TBA	May 4, 2022

== Production ==
Julie Graham was attracted to the script's portrayal of older women, explaining that "Cat, Jane, and Beth... are all in their fifties... it was a joy to see scenes about authentic females in a family. It's unusual and it's important and of this moment", while Olivia Vinall said the series "feels really truthful [about] the way the women behave." Graham also called Queens of Mystery "very tongue-in-cheek and cartoonish."

Filming for the first season took place in Kent, specifically in Stone Street in Cranbrook. Production used Lympne Castle as Hiddledean Castle in the fictional town of Wildemarsh in the "Murder In The Dark" episode. The series visited several locations in Farningham, Beth’s cottage was filmed at Mill Estate. Wadard Books doubled as the Murder Ink bookshop and Jane’s house. Farningham Village Store also featured as Wildemarsh Village stores and the Entrance to The Corn Exchange Theatre. In the "Death By Vinyl" episode, Stoneydale craft shop in Cranbrook was converted into The Sound and Fury record shop. Cranbrook also features as the High street throughout the series. St Michael's Churchyard in Smarden was used as the Wildemarsh churchyard and a private residence in Water Lane featured as the village's Embittered Hack Pub. The police station is filmed at the old school building in Benenden, alongside the village green and church in the backdrop.

== Critical reception ==
The New York Times recommended the series due to its "whimsical" tone, noting its "fairy-tale-style omniscient narrator" and comparing it favorably with Pushing Daisies. Writing for TV Insider, Matt Roush found Queens of Mystery to be in the same vein as Murder, She Wrote, yet inferior to sibling Acorn TV series Agatha Raisin.
