= 7 Lives =

- Film poster
- Directed by: Paul Wilkins
- Written by: Paul Wilkins
- Starring: Danny Dyer
- Cinematography: James Friend; Nick Gordon Smith
- Edited by: Nigel Galt
- Music by: Michael Price
- Production company: Starfish Films
- Distributed by: Revolver (UK)
- Release date: 7 October 2011
- Running time: 90 minutes
- Country: United Kingdom
- Language: English
- Budget: $2,500

7 Lives is a 2011 British fantasy drama film directed by Paul Wilkins and starring Danny Dyer, Kate Ashfield and Martin Compston.

The film revolves around a working-class blue collar who finds himself in a body-swapping odyssey after an ambush by a group of hoodies. His quest to reunite with the empty shell of himself leads to tragic consequences but also show him the errors on his life.

== Plot ==
Tom, a married family man, is struggling at work when a client tries to seduce him with promises of a 'more exciting life'. On his way home one night, he gets attacked by a gang of hoodies and falls into a parallel world where he lives 5 other lives including that of a rock star, a homeless person and the 'hoody' that attacked him. These lives help him to re-evaluate his priorities and values but in order to get home he must face some of his deepest desires and fears. Will he make it home or is the grass greener on the other side?

== Cast ==
- Danny Dyer as Tom
- Kate Ashfield as Cynthia
- Nick Brimble as Ted
- Martin Compston as Rory, The Rockstar
- Craig Conway as Keith
- Michael Elwyn as Brian
- Helen George as Valerie
- Tom Goodman-Hill as Peter
- Julien Ball as Doctor
- Theo Barklem-Biggs as Kid

== Critical reception ==
GASHE.com gave the film a rating of 2 1/2 stars saying, "While the plot is dark and uncomfortable at times, it moves along at a decent pace and the unique use of different lead actors for each story works."

== Release ==
The film was released on 7 October 2011. The film was released on DVD and Blu-ray on 10 October 2011.
