= Robin Bernheim =

American television producer and writer

- Born: Robin Jill Bernheim; Santa Monica, California, U.S.
- Other name: Robin Bernheim Burger
- Education: Stanford University; UCLA
- Occupations: Television screenwriter & producer
- Years active: 1983–present
- Spouse: David Burger
- Family: Douglas Bernheim (brother)

Robin Jill Bernheim is an American television producer and writer, as well as a story editor and creative consultant.

== Career ==
Bernheim was born in Santa Monica, California, and is a graduate of Stanford University and UCLA, from the latter of which she received her MBA. She broke into television by submitting a spec script to Remington Steele, which starred Stephanie Zimbalist, her friend since childhood. Executive producer Michael Gleason then hired Bernheim on staff, leading to her career as one of the few women writing and producing hour-long, network television dramas in the 1980s and 1990s, including shows like Quantum Leap, Crazy Like a Fox, Houston Knights, MacGyver, Renegade and Tekwar. One of her Star Trek:Voyager episodes was chosen in 2020 by The Hollywood Reporter as one of the most memorable in the series' history

Her work also includes several forays into animation, writing episodes of the Men In Black: The Series and Extreme Ghostbusters cartoons. In 2015, she co-produced and wrote the acclaimed PBS documentary feature Little House On The Prairie: The Legacy of Laura Ingalls Wilder. She was the executive producer of the hit Hallmark series When Calls the Heart from 2015 to 2017, the writer-producer of several Hallmark movies (including I'll Be Home For Christmas and Royal Hearts) and in 2019 co-wrote & co-created the network's Mystery 101 series of movies with Lee Goldberg. Most recently, Bernheim co-wrote and co-produced the 2019 Netflix movie The Princess Switch starring Vanessa Hudgens, as well as a sequel, The Princess Switch: Switched Again.

She wrote, created & executive produced the Acorn original mystery You're Killing Me (2026 TV series) starring Brooke Shields, Amalia Williamson, and Tom Cavanagh. The six-episode first season premiered in May 2026 as the highest rated series in the history of Acorn, which immediately renewed the show for a second season, to air in Spring 2027. Lee Goldberg, with whom she co-created and co-wrote Mystery 101, is also a writer/executive producer on the series .

== Personal life ==
Bernheim lives in Dublin, California, with her husband David Burger. Her brother is Douglas Bernheim, currently the Edward Ames Edmunds Professor of Economics at Stanford University.

== Filmography ==
Year	Title	Role/Job	Episodes/ Notes
1986	Crazy Like a Fox	Writer, story editor	2 episodes
1986	MacGyver	Writer, executive story consultant	2 episodes, "The Eraser" & "The Human Factor"
1986–87	Remington Steele	Writer, executive story editor	7 episodes
1987	Beauty and the Beast	Writer	Episode: "Dark Spirit"
1987	Houston Knights	Co-producer, writer	Wrote/produced episode "Mirrors"
1987	Matlock	Writer, executive story consultant	7 episodes
1990	Star Trek: The Next Generation	Writer	Episode: "The Hunted"
1990–91	Over My Dead Body	Writer	2 episodes
1992	Tequila and Bonetti	Producer, writer	5 episodes
1991–92	Beyond Reality	Writer	3 episodes
1992–93	Quantum Leap	Producer, writer	5 episodes
1993–96	Renegade	Supervising producer, writer	6 episodes
1994–96	TekWar	Writer, supervising creative consultant	22 episodes
1994–98	Diagnosis: Murder	Writer	3 episodes
1995	Silk Stalkings	Writer	Episode: "Tricks of the Trade"
1995–96	Renegade	Supervising producer	20 episodes
1997	Extreme Ghostbusters	Writer	Episode: "Witchy Woman"
1997–98	Ghost Stories	Writer	5 episodes
1998	Men in Black: The Series	Writer	Episode: "The Jack O'Lantern Syndrome"
1999–2000	Star Trek: Voyager	Producer, writer	29 episodes
1999	Soldier of Fortune, Inc.	Writer	Episode: "Critical List"
2000–01	Earth: Final Conflict	Writer	22 episodes
2003	Wild Card	Writer	TV series; credited as Robin Jill Burger
2003–04	She Spies	Supervising producer, writer	23 episodes
2015–2017	When Calls the Heart	Executive producer, writer, showrunner	29 episodes total
2018	The Princess Switch	Writer, producer	Netflix film
2019–2021	Mystery 101	Co-creator	7 Hallmark Movies & Mysteries films
2020	The Princess Switch: Switched Again	Writer, producer	Netflix film
2021	The Princess Switch 3	Writer, executive producer	Netflix film
2023	When Calls the Heart	Consulting producer	Season 10; 6 episodes
2024	Mother of the Bride	Writer	Netflix film
2026-	You're Killing Me	Creator, writer, executive producer	12 episodes, AMC/Acorn
