= The Princess Switch 3: Romancing the Star =

American Christmas romantic comedy film

- Official release poster
- Directed by: Mike Rohl
- Written by: Robin Bernheim Burger
- Based on: Characters by: Robin Bernheim Burger; Megan Metzger
- Produced by: Vanessa Hudgens; Brad Krevoy
- Starring: Vanessa Hudgens; Nick Sagar; Sam Palladio; Remy Hii; Will Kemp; Amanda Donohoe
- Cinematography: Fernando Argüelles
- Edited by: Lee Haxall
- Music by: Jina Hyojin An; Shirley Song
- Production companies: MPCA; Brad Krevoy Productions
- Distributed by: Netflix
- Release date: November 18, 2021
- Running time: 106 minutes
- Country: United States
- Language: English

The Princess Switch 3: Romancing the Star is a 2021 American Christmas romantic comedy film directed by Mike Rohl and written by Robin Bernheim Burger, based on the characters created by Burger and Megan Metzger. The third and final installment in The Princess Switch Trilogy, stars Vanessa Hudgens, Sam Palladio, Suanne Braun, Nick Sagar and Hazel Beattie. The story follows Margaret Delacourt, Queen of Montenaro, Stacy Juliette DeNovo Wyndham, Princess of Belgravia and Lady Fiona Pembroke, Margaret's cousin. When a priceless Christmas relic is stolen, the trio come together and track down a mysterious jewel thief.

The film is produced by Hudgens and Brad Krevoy, and it was released on Netflix on November 18, 2021.

== Plot ==
Princess Stacy Wyndham of Belgravia and Queen Margaret Delacourt of Montenaro are preparing to host an international Christmas festival in Montenaro, the centerpiece of which is the "Star of Peace", a sacred relic loaned by the Vatican. Shortly after the Star arrives, thieves break into the palace and steal it.

Stacy and Margaret decide to approach Lady Fiona Pembroke, who is currently on probation and working as a custodian at an orphanage, for help to track down the Star. She agrees to help in exchange for Margaret putting in a good word for her when her case is reviewed by a disciplinary board after Christmas. Fiona consults her ex-boyfriend, Peter Maxwell, a disgraced former Interpol investigator who now runs his own private security firm.

Peter quickly deduces that the mastermind behind the Star's disappearance is Hunter Cunard, a billionaire obsessed with stealing priceless works of art for his personal collection. Fiona charms Hunter into giving her an invitation to the Christmas party at his estate. Peter then recruits Fiona's assistants, Mindy and Reggie, to practice infiltrating Hunter's estate and bypassing his security measures while Fiona distracts him at the party.

Reggie injures himself during training, so Margaret agrees to impersonate Fiona at the party. This is while Peter and Fiona, stepping in for Reggie, retrieve the Star from the security vault. As they get ready for the mission, Fiona reflects over her unrequited feelings for Peter, whom she has known since childhood.

The plan is set into motion, and at first, everything goes smoothly until Peter accidentally trips a pressure plate alarm while retrieving the Star. Panicked, Reggie and Mindy shut off the fake security footage Peter had installed, alerting Hunter to the theft. Peter gives Fiona a bag with the Star and stays behind to distract Hunter's men while Frank picks up Fiona. Margaret also escapes with the help of the coat check angel man.

Meanwhile, Stacy receives word from the head of the orphanage that Fiona's hearing has been rescheduled to the same night as the heist. She decides to dress up as Fiona and appear in front of the committee, accompanied by Prince Edward as a character witness. With Stacy impersonating a remorseful Fiona, the board decides on a commutation of sentence.

Everyone regroups at the palace, but Fiona soon discovers that the bag she is carrying contains a decoy. Believing that Peter tricked them, Margaret and Stacy agree to reveal the truth to the Vatican. However, Fiona, Mindy, and Reggie plan to leave the county despite Margaret inviting them to stay for Christmas.

Peter asks Fiona to meet him, and when she does he explains that he took the Star to get her attention. He asks her to speak with Bianca, who has traveled to Montenaro to make peace with her daughter. Fiona angrily refuses to forgive her and is about to leave when she realizes that doing so would be repeating the same mistake her mother made. She goes back and hugs Bianca, forgiving her. They then return the Star to Stacy and Margaret just in time.

At the lighting of the festival's Christmas tree, Margaret reveals to Kevin that she gave the police evidence of Hunter's crimes. Fiona, despite finally being welcomed back into her cousin's family, is miserable about not having anyone to share the holiday with when Peter suddenly reappears despite their fight. They share a kiss as the Star of Peace lights up to celebrate the new year.

== Cast ==
- Vanessa Hudgens as
  - Stacy Juliette DeNovo-Wyndham− Princess of Belgravia and Edward's wife
  - Margaret Katherine Claire Delacourt-Richards− Queen of Montenaro, Kevin's wife and Olivia's stepmother
  - Lady Fiona Clara Karen Pembroke− Margaret's cousin and Lord Percival and Lady Bianca Pembroke's daughter
- Sam Palladio as Edward Wyndham− Prince of Belgravia and Stacy's husband
- Nick Sagar as Kevin Richards− Stacy's best friend, Margaret's husband, Olivia's father and Prince Consort of Montenaro
- Remy Hii as Peter Maxwell− Fiona's boyfriend
- Will Kemp as Hunter Cunard− a suave and sophisticated international hotelier-cum-master thief
- Amanda Donohoe as Lady Bianca Pembroke− Fiona's mother and Margaret's aunt
- Mark Fleischmann as Frank De Luca− Prince Edward's personal assistant
- Suanne Braun as Mrs. Donatelli− Queen Margaret's personal assistant
- Ricky Norwood as Reggie− Fiona's "minion"
- Florence Hall as Mindy− Fiona's "minion"
- Mia Lloyd as Princess Olivia Richards− Kevin's daughter, Margaret's stepdaughter and Stacy's goddaughter and Princess of Montenaro
- Chidi Ajufo as Black Suit Security Guard #2
- Robin Soans as Kindly Old Man
- Hazel Beattie as Mother Superior

=== Cameo appearances ===
- Theo Devaney as Count Simon Duxbury from A Christmas Prince franchise

== Production ==
In November 2020, Netflix confirmed that a third film in the series, The Princess Switch 3: Romancing the Star, was in pipeline. Filming began in Scotland in late 2020, with anticipated release during the Christmas holidays in 2021.

The primary filming location was Hopetoun House in South Queensferry along with other locations such as Gosford House and Manderston.

== Reception ==
On review aggregator Rotten Tomatoes, the film holds an approval rating of 57% based on 14 reviews, with an average rating of 5/10.

For Tell-Tale TV Alicia Gilstorf rated the film with 4 stars out of 5 and stated, "'We don't watch these films expecting them to be great works of cinema. We watch holiday movies for their comforting formulas. Princess Switch 3 delivers this light energy while leaning into the chaos that gives it that edge." Helen T. Verongos writing for The New York Times criticized the film and opined, "Anyone ... can just take over for the characters and guess their lines as easily as the three cousins can swap clothes and accents to impersonate one another." But, she appreciated the character of Fiona writing, "Fiona grabs the spotlight this year" and "she is drawn as the one character who actually grows". For entertainment.ie Deirdre Molumby rated the film with 1 star out of 5 and called its narrative "very basic, very silly, and plot hole-filled". Molumby wrote, "There really isn't all that much to say about threequel's quality - and one can pretty much surmise where we're going with the story within its first few minutes" Concluding her review she opined, "[The film] has an impressive tango sequence where Hudgens and her partner impress. But .... to find much else of interest and enjoyment in this – especially when really far too many silly dance sequences follow [is a struggle]". Ferdosa Abdi of Screen Rant graded the film with 4 stars out of 5 and said about Hudgens's performance, "Hudgens is so good she manages to distract from the less than interesting ensemble cast". In conclusion Abdi wrote, "The premise is as ridiculous as the trilogy's conceit, but due to Vanessa Hudgens' herculean efforts, The Princess Switch 3 will be a hit with fans."

== See also ==
- List of Christmas films
