= Michael Rohl =

Canadian film and TV director

- Born: Canada
- Other name: Mike
- Spouse: JD Derbyshire (div.)
- Children: Kacey Rohl

Michael Rohl is a Canadian TV director and producer. He has worked on Shadowhunters, Smallville, Supernatural, Terminator: The Sarah Connor Chronicles, Andromeda, Kyle XY, and Reaper as well as many other programs. He and ex-spouse, writer JD Derbyshire, have a daughter, actress Kacey Rohl.

== Partial filmography ==
- My Secret Santa (2025)
- The Princess Switch 3: Romancing the Star (2021)
- The Princess Switch: Switched Again (2020)
- When Hope Calls (2019)
- The Princess Switch (2018)
- Chesapeake Shores (2017–2018)
- Shadowhunters (TV series) (2017; 2019)
- When Calls the Heart (2015–2021; 2024)
- Signed, Sealed, Delivered (2014)
- Helix (TV series) (2013)
- Primeval: New World (TV series) (2012)
- Continuum (2012)
- Haven (TV series) (2010)
- Defying Gravity (2009)
- Impact TV miniseries (2009)
- Angela's Eyes (TV series) (2007)
- Reaper (2007)
- Supernatural (2006-2012)
- Smallville (2006–2011)
- Kyle XY (TV series) (2006)
- Andromeda (2002)
- The Outer Limits (1999-2000)
- Snowbound: The Jim and Jennifer Stolpa Story (Made for TV movie) (1994)
