= The Music of Nashville: Season 5, Volume 1 =

Soundtrack album by Various artists
- Released: March 10, 2017
- Recorded: 2016–2017
- Genre: Country; country pop; country rock
- Length: 31:03
- Label: Big Machine Records
- Producer: Lionsgate Television; CMT; Hulu; ABC Studios; Tim Lauer

The Music of Nashville chronology
The Music of Nashville: Season 4, Volume 2 (2016)	The Music of Nashville: Season 5, Volume 1 (2017)	The Music of Nashville: Season 5, Volume 2 (2017)

The Music of Nashville: Season 5, Volume 1 is the ninth original soundtrack from the American musical drama television series Nashville, created by Academy Award winner Callie Khouri and starring Connie Britton as country music superstar Rayna Jaymes and Hayden Panettiere as Juliette Barnes. The album was released digitally on March 10, 2017, and on compact disc exclusively through Target in North America. The album reached number 8 on the US soundtrack charts. This album also marks the first release with the show's association with CMT as the show was canceled after its fourth season by ABC.

== Track listing ==
No.	Title	Writer(s)	Performer(s)	Length
1.	"God Shall Wipe All The Tears Away"	J.R. Baxter and Wesley H. Daniel	Rhiannon Giddens	2:48
2.	"Your Best"	Claire Guerreso	Lennon Stella and Maisy Stella	3:08
3.	"All of Me"	Phillip LaRue, Tim Lauer, and Lindy Robbins	Clare Bowen and Sam Palladio	3:22
4.	"Simple As That"	Carson Chamberlain, Jeff Hyde, and Roger Springer	Charles Esten	3:08
5.	"A Few Steps My Way"	Gareth Dunlop	Joseph David-Jones	3:32
6.	"My Favorite Hurricane"	Jillian Chapman	Connie Britton and Charles Esten	3:17
7.	"Burn to Dark"	Jake Etheridge and Garrison Starr	Chris Carmack	1:54
8.	"On My Way"	Thomas Finchum, Paige Blue, and Chance Pena	Hayden Panettiere	4:01
9.	"Won't Back Down"	Trent Dabbs and Matt Dragstrem	Jonathan Jackson	2:54
10.	"Sanctuary"	Sarah Siskind, Jill Andrews and Gary Nicholson	Charles Esten, Lennon Stella, Maisy Stella	3:23
Total length:				31:03
