= Chaley Rose =

American actress and singer

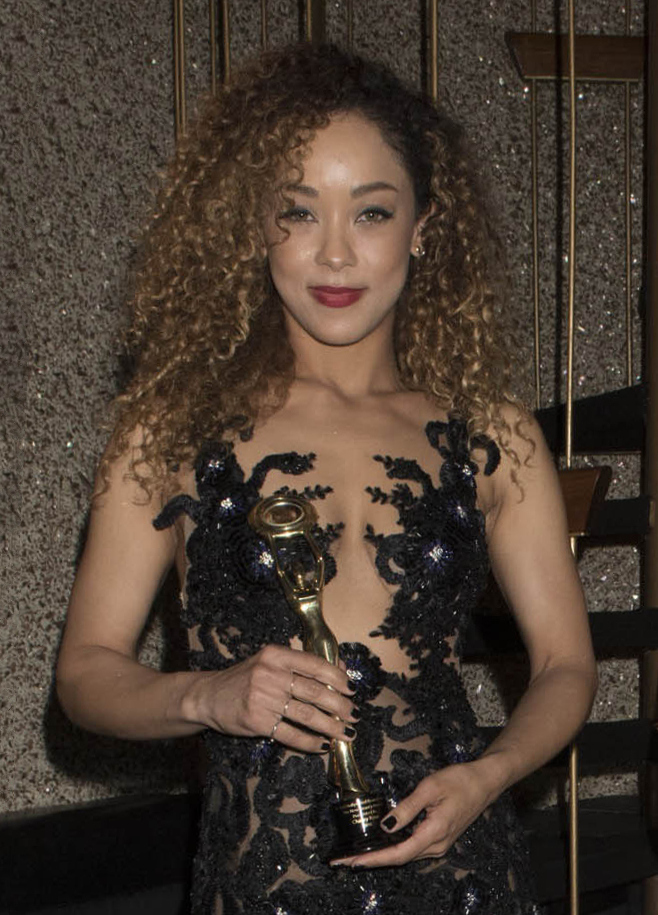
- Rose in 2016
- Born: November 29, 1986 (age 39); Columbus, Indiana, U.S.
- Occupations: Actress, singer

Chaley Rose is an American actress and singer. She is best known for her role as Zoey in the ABC drama series Nashville.

== Personal life ==
Chaley Rose Jackson was born on November 29, 1986 and raised in the city of Columbus, Indiana. She attended Central Middle School and Columbus East High School where she was a cheerleader, gymnast, and on the track team. She was the school's first Black homecoming queen. After high school, she graduated from Indiana University. She then spent time studying acting in New York City before moving to Los Angeles.

== Filmography ==
Year	Title	Role	Notes
2013–2015	Nashville	Zoey Dalton	Seasons 2–3 (recurring; 27 episodes), Season 4 (Guest)
2013	36 Saints	Bathsheba	
2013	Channing	Jules / Nanny	Television film
2013	Anger Management	Barista	Episode: "Charlie and His New Friend with Benefits"
2015	Stitchers	Sadie Morton	Episode: "The Root of All Evil"
2015	Filthy Preppy Teens	Tarcher Bishop	8 episodes
2018	Code Black	Pepper Russo	2 episodes
2018	Dinner for Two	Angela	Television film
2019	A Christmas Duet	Averie Davis	Television film
2019	Holiday Heist	Jade	Television film
2020	Lucifer	Destiny Page	Episode: "Detective Amenadiel"
2020	My Best Friend's Bouquet	Josie Hughes	Television film

== Discography ==
=== Soundtracks ===
The Music of Nashville: Season 2, Volume 1 (2013)

- Contributed 2 tracks: "Wayfaring Stranger" and "Come See About Me" with Clare Bowen

The Music of Nashville: Season 2, Volume 2 (2014)

- Contributed 3 tracks: "I Ain't Leavin' Without Your Love" with Sam Palladio and Jonathan Jackson, "Hennessee" with Sam Palladio and Jonathan Jackson and "Carry You Home"

Christmas with Nashville (2014)

- Contributed 2 tracks: "Have Yourself A Merry Little Christmas" and "Celebrate Me Home" with the Nashville cast

The Music of Nashville: Season 3, Volume 1 (2014)

- Contributed 1 track: "The Most Beautiful Girl In The World" with Sam Palladio and Jonathan Jackson

The Music of Nashville: Season 4, Volume 1 (2015)

- Contributed 1 track: "Take My Hand, Precious Lord"
