= Jonathan Jackson (actor) =

American actor, musician, and author (born 1982)

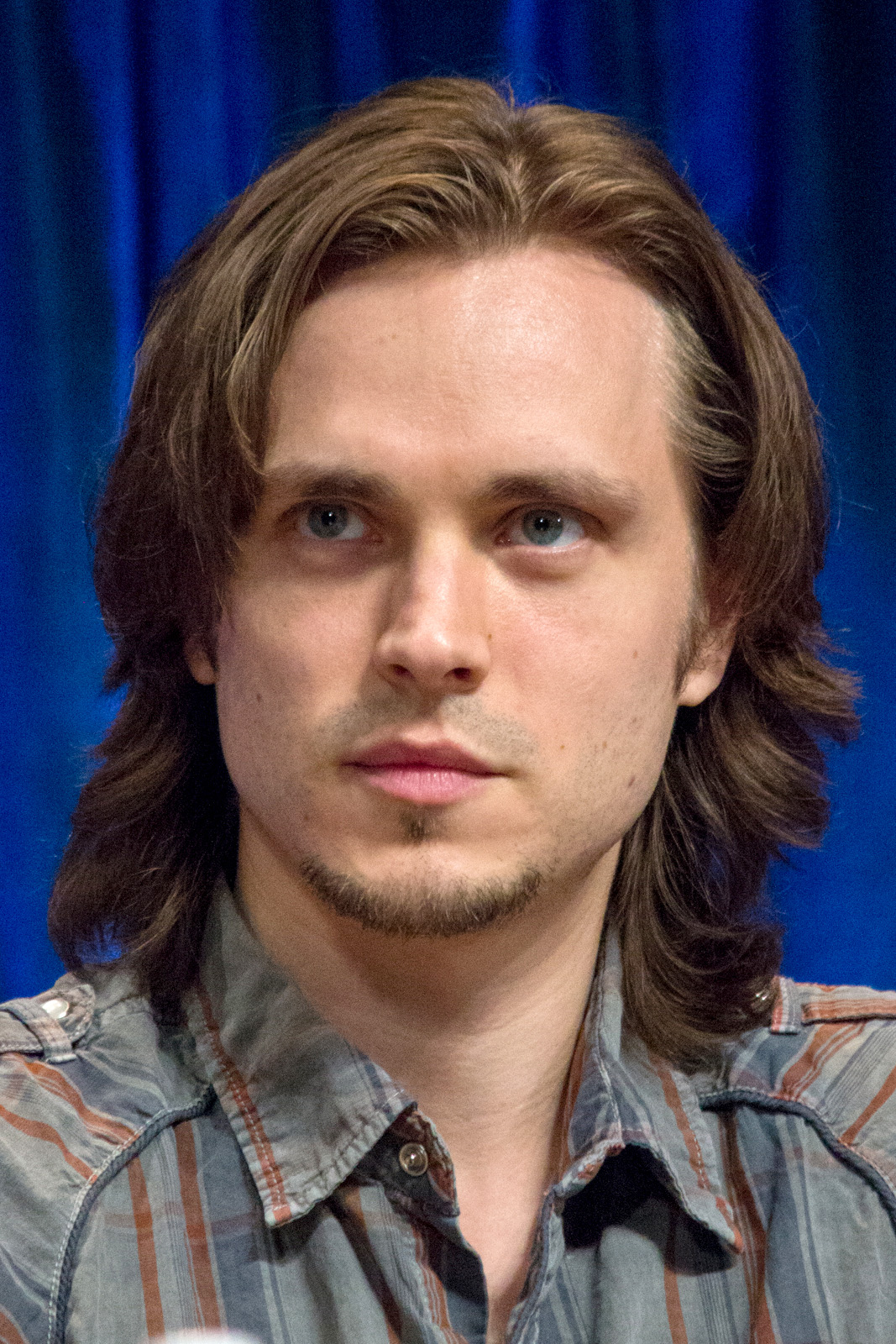
- Jackson at PaleyFest 2013
- Born: Jonathan Stevens Jackson; May 11, 1982 (age 44); Orlando, Florida, U.S.
- Occupations: Actor; singer; author
- Years active: 1993–present
- Spouse: Lisa Vultaggio (m. 2002)
- Children: 3
- Relatives: Candice Jackson (sister); Richard Lee Jackson (brother)
- Musical career
- Origin: Battle Ground, Washington, U.S.
- Instruments: Vocals; guitar; piano
- Member of: Enation
- Website: jonathanjackson.com

Jonathan Stevens Jackson (born May 11, 1982) is an American actor, musician, and author. He is best known for his role as Lucky Spencer in the television soap opera General Hospital (1993–1999, 2009–2011, 2015, 2024–2025), which won him six Daytime Emmy Awards. He is also known for his roles in the films The Deep End of the Ocean (1999), Tuck Everlasting (2002), Dirty Dancing: Havana Nights (2004), and Riding the Bullet (2004), as well as the television series Nashville (2012–2018), for which he received a Critics' Choice Television Award nomination.

== Early life ==
Jackson was born in Orlando, Florida, the son of Jeanine (née Sharp), an amateur ventriloquist and businesswoman, and Dr. Rick "Ricky Lee" Jackson, a family physician, country musician and Congressional candidate in the state of Washington. Jackson was raised in Battle Ground, Washington, with his brother Richard Lee Jackson, now an actor and musician, and his sister Candice Jackson, now a lawyer, an author, and formerly served as an official in the Trump administration as the Deputy Assistant Secretary for Strategic Operations and Outreach in the Office for Civil Rights (OCR) of the U.S. Department of Education, the Office's Acting Assistant Secretary from April 2017 to July 2018; and the Deputy General Counsel of the Department of Education from July 2018 to January 2021. Jonathan attended Meadow Glade Elementary School.

In 1991, Jackson's family took a trip to Universal Studios Hollywood, where both Richard and Jonathan decided to pursue acting. The brothers took acting lessons in nearby Portland, Oregon, before moving part-time to Burbank, California with their mother in 1993.After doing various commercials, within six months Jackson won a role on the ABC Daytime soap opera General Hospital. Jackson continued his studies as he worked, graduating from high school at age 16.

== Career ==
=== Acting ===
Jackson's first notable role was Lucky Spencer on the ABC soap opera General Hospital, a role he first played from 1993 to 1999. Jackson won numerous awards for his work as Lucky. He was nominated for the Daytime Emmy Award for Outstanding Younger Actor in a Drama Series six times, winning first in 1995, and again in 1998 and 1999, making him the record holder for both nominations and wins for the Younger Actor category. He also won Soap Opera Digest Awards in 1995 and 1999. He was nominated for Young Artist Awards in 1996, 1997 and 1999. He won The Hollywood Reporter's YoungStar Award in 1995, 1997, 1998 and 1999 and was nominated in 2000. Jackson also became a popular "teen heartthrob" among fans, featured on fan magazines such as Tiger Beat and garnering many fan clubs and internet fansites. In 1999, he was named one of People magazine's 50 most beautiful people.

While working at General Hospital, Jackson starred in his first feature film Camp Nowhere, as Morris "Mud" Himmel in 1994. Also during this time he starred in made-for-television films The Prisoner of Zenda, Inc. and The Legend of the Ruby Silver, and made a guest appearance during Season 5 of the ABC sitcom Boy Meets World. In 1999, Jackson filmed The Deep End of the Ocean shortly before leaving General Hospital, starring opposite Michelle Pfeiffer. Deep End director Ulu Grosbard spoke of Jackson as "an enormously gifted actor. He brought a weight and a presence and chemistry with Michelle from the beginning. He's only 15 years old and he is a very serious actor who has both concentration and humor." Pfeiffer added, "When Jonathan and I read together, it was like he was my own son. And we just went at each other in only this way that a mother and son could do. His reading was exhilarating." Jackson was nominated for YoungStar Awards in 1997 for The Prisoner of Zenda, Inc. and 1999 for The Deep End of the Ocean.

In December 1999, Newsweek magazine reported Jackson was likely to be taking on the role of Anakin Skywalker in Star Wars: Episode II – Attack of the Clones. However, he was soon dropped from the running, and publications speculated the prior publicity had hurt his chances due to creator George Lucas' preference for privacy. Jackson continued his film career in 2000 with the independent film True Rights and the ABC television movie Trapped in a Purple Haze. Jackson also wrote and directed a short film with his brother Richard entitled Crystal Clear, which won Best Dramatic Short Film and the Coen Brothers Award for Duo-Filmmaking at the Brooklyn Film Festival. In 2002, Jackson played one of his most well-known film roles as Jesse Tuck in Tuck Everlasting, which he filmed simultaneously with Insomnia. In 2004, Jackson filmed Dirty Dancing: Havana Nights, and Riding the Bullet. From 2008 through 2009, he had a recurring role as Kyle Reese in the hit Fox TV show Terminator: The Sarah Connor Chronicles, playing the father of John Connor before the show was cancelled.

On September 29, 2009, it was announced that Jackson would return to General Hospital on October 27 to reprise the role of Lucky Spencer. In 2011, Jackson won his fourth Daytime Emmy and first Outstanding Supporting Actor Award. On November 7, 2011, it was announced that Jackson had decided to leave General Hospital and his final airdate was on December 23, 2011. His character is not planned to be recast or killed off, leaving the door open for Jackson to return with the show in the future. In 2012, Jackson won his fifth Daytime Emmy and second consecutive win for Outstanding Supporting Actor in a Drama Series.

In 2012, he got the role of singer-songwriter Avery Barkley in the ABC drama Nashville. Along with the rest of the cast, Jackson sang and played the guitar himself on the series.

On June 25, 2024, it was announced Jackson would return to General Hospital in the summer for a long run.

=== Music ===
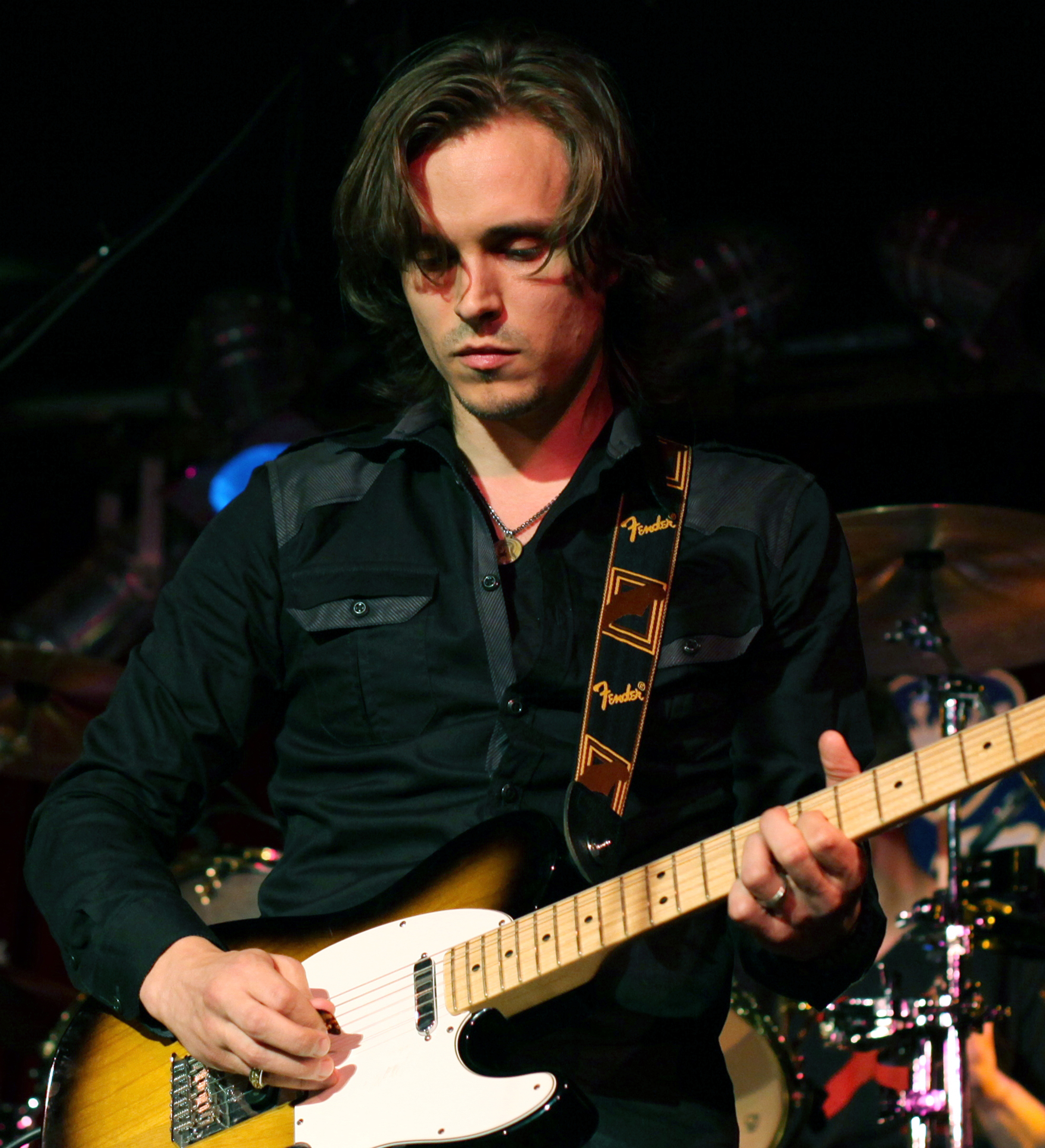
Jackson performing with Enation in 2013

As a child, Jackson took guitar lessons and taught himself to play the piano. Growing up he had an evolving band with various family members. In 2000, the band included his brother, uncle and father and was named "Scarlet Road". By 2002, Jackson and his brother Richard had named their group "Jono and the Rock".

The ensemble morphed into Enation, where Jackson is the frontman, playing guitar, vocals and writing most of the songs. Other band members include Jackson's brother Richard (drums), and their friend Jonathan Thatcher (bass, previously of Delirious?)

The band has released several albums and their song "Feel This" became a Top 10 hit on the iTunes national Rock Charts after it was featured on the CW television drama series One Tree Hill. Enation's songs have also been featured on Riding the Bullet, and General Hospital.

As well as performing as singer, guitarist & piano Jackson also wrote the song "The Morning of the Rain" featured on episodes 7 and 19 of the first season of Nashville. Enation also landed on the Billboard Top 10 (Live From Nashville DVD, #9) and have garnered numerous radio and TV appearances including live performances on The View and VH1's Big Morning Buzz Live.

In June 2020, Jackson recorded a song dedicated to the Hilandar and Serbian Orthodox monasteries in Kosovo.

=== Books ===
In the spring of 2012, Jackson released a book of poetry under the name J. S. Jackson, titled Book of Solace and Madness. In June 2012, he discussed his yet-to-be-released book entitled Acting in the Spirit, which would discuss the connection between his Eastern Orthodox Christian faith and his acting career. In November 2014, Jackson released The Mystery of Art: Becoming an Artist in the Image of God.

== Personal life ==
=== Family ===
At age 20, Jackson married former General Hospital actress Lisa Vultaggio on June 21, 2002. Jackson told the Chicago Sun-Times, "Some people thought we were a little young to get married. But we didn't see the need to wait. When it's right, it's right." The couple moved to Jackson's hometown of Battle Ground, Washington, to raise their family. They have three children: Caleb (b. June 21, 2003), Adora (b. 2005), and Titus Gabriel (b. October 7, 2010).

=== Religion ===
I've never presented Jesus in a car salesman sort of way. I don't believe in that for me. I don't want to turn anyone away because they're feeling pressured. The most positive influence I've had is people seeing the kind of life I'm living and the way I treat people. If people ask where that comes from, I'll say it comes from Jesus. And I'm definitely not ashamed of that.

— Jackson on his faith, in 1998

The son of Seventh-day Adventist parents, Jackson was raised as a non-denominational Christian and has always been vocal about his faith. As part of his belief system, as a teen Jackson chose not to drink or do drugs. Jackson was also a proponent of abstinence from premarital sex. Jackson also often thanked God during his award acceptance speeches. While Jackson was working on General Hospital, he and his family held a home church in Burbank that various cast members attended, including Jackson's future wife Lisa Vultaggio. Jackson explained how his beliefs affected his choice of acting roles in an interview with Entertainment Weekly in 1999, "I won't get involved with a movie that's a direct slap in the face of God. [...] I'm an actor, so I have to play people who believe differently than me. I would be willing to play a character that was completely unbelieving and anti-God, just as long as that wasn't the message of the whole movie."

In 2002, Jackson participated in the DKNY-sponsored "What's Your Anti-Drug?" campaign, posing for the 2003 calendar featured in Cosmogirl magazine, stating that his anti-drug was faith. In 2012, Jackson and his family were baptized into the Eastern Orthodox Church. Jackson cited a trip to Romania and Rome that first brought his attention to learning about the history of Christianity. In his acceptance speech for his 2012 Daytime Emmy Award, he thanked the Holy Trinity as well as the monks on Orthodox monastic enclave Mount Athos. Jackson later explained in an interview, "These people [are] dedicating their lives to prayer, and not just praying for themselves, but truly praying for all of us. And then the thought kind of crossed my mind: with all the destruction, chaos and insanity that goes on in this world, if their prayers weren't happening, what would this world be like? I felt, personally, like I just wanted to thank them because I really believe that their prayers mean a lot."

As of September 18, 2020, OrthoChristian.com reports that Jackson had moved to Ireland to help support a new monastery being founded by the Romanian Orthodox Metropolis of Southern and Western Europe. He explains in the interview, "It’s the main reason I moved, I have been praying for years for an Orthodox monastery to be founded in Ireland."

At the September 28, 2024, annual conference of the Shakespeare Oxford Fellowship he presented "The Moral and Spiritual Vision of Edward DeVere", in which he suggests that Greek Orthodox Christianity has much in common with Devere's spiritual vision as seen in his letters, poetry, and the works of Shakespeare. In particular he explores the alignment of the thought of John Chrysostom and Baldassare Castiglione with DeVere's faith.

== Filmography ==
=== Film ===
| Year | Title | Role | Notes |
|---|---|---|---|
| 1994 | Camp Nowhere | Morris "Mud" Himmel | Film debut |
| 1996 | The Prisoner of Zenda, Inc. | Rudy Gatewick/Oliver Gillis | TV movie |
| 1996 | The Legend of the Ruby Silver | Matt Rainie | TV movie |
| 1999 | The Deep End of the Ocean | Vincent Cappadora - Age 16 | |
| 2000 | True Rights | Charlie Vick | TV movie |
| 2000 | Crystal Clear | Eddie | Short film also written and directed by Jackson |
| 2000 | Trapped in a Purple Haze | Max Hanson | TV movie |
| 2001 | Skeletons in the Closet | Seth Reed | |
| 2001 | On the Edge | Toby | |
| 2002 | Insomnia | Randy Stetz | |
| 2002 | Tuck Everlasting | Jesse Tuck | |
| 2004 | Dirty Dancing: Havana Nights | James Phelps | |
| 2004 | Riding the Bullet | Alan Parker | |
| 2005 | Venom | Eric | |
| 2006 | A Little Thing Called Murder | Kenny Kimes | TV movie |
| 2010 | Kalamity | Stanley Keller | |
| 2020 | Saint Joseph the Hesychast | Joseph the Hesychast | |
| 2024 | Unsung Hero | Eddie DeGarmo | |
| 2025 | El Tonto Por Cristo | Eagle | |

=== Television ===
| Year | Title | Role | Notes |
|---|---|---|---|
| 1993–1999; 2009–2011; 2015; 2024–2025 | General Hospital | Lucky Spencer | Regular role |
| 1998 | Boy Meets World | Ricky Ferris | 2 episodes |
| 2001 | Night Visions | Devin | Episode: If a Tree Falls |
| 2003 | The Twilight Zone | Martin | Episode: Sunrise |
| 2008 | One Tree Hill | Himself | Cameo with Enation |
| 2008–2009 | Terminator: The Sarah Connor Chronicles | Kyle Reese | 4 episodes |
| 2012–2018 | Nashville | Avery Barkley | Main cast; 121 episodes |
| 2017 | NashChat | Himself | Guest host; week 4 |

== Soundtrack appearances ==
The Music of Nashville: Season 1, Volume 1 (2012)

- Contributed 1 track: "Twist Of Barbwire"

The Music of Nashville: Season 1, Volume 2 (2013)

- Contributed 2 tracks: "Let There Be Lonely" and "Keep Asking Why"

The Music of Nashville: Season 2, Volume 1 (2013)

- Contributed 2 tracks: "You Learn How To Live Alone" and "Be My Girl" with Sam Palladio

The Music of Nashville: Season 2, Volume 2 (2014)

- Contributed 3 tracks: "Hennessee" with Sam Palladio and Chaley Rose, "Everything I'll Ever Need" with Hayden Panettiere and "I Ain't Leavin' Without Your Love" with Sam Palladio and Chaley Rose

Christmas with Nashville (2014)

- Contributed 2 tracks: "Christmas (Baby Please Come Home)" and Celebrate Me Home with the Nashville cast

The Music of Nashville: Season 3, Volume 1 (2014)

- Contributed 1 track: "The Most Beautiful Girl In The World" with Sam Palladio and Chaley Rose

The Music of Nashville: Season 3, Volume 2 (2015)

- Contributed 6 tracks: "Borrow My Heart" with Sam Palladio and Clare Bowen, "This Is What I Need To Say", "Hold You In My Arms" with Hayden Panettiere, "My Song" with Sam Palladio and Clare Bowen, "Novocaine" with Laura Benanti and "One By One" with Hayden Panettiere

The Music of Nashville: Season 4, Volume 1 (2015)

- Contributed 2 tracks: "History of My Heart" and "Sleep Tonight (A Lullaby)" with Chris Carmack

The Music of Nashville: Season 4, Volume 2 (2016)

- Contributed 2 tracks: "History of My Heart" and "Sleep Tonight (A Lullaby)" with Chris Carmack

The Music of Nashville: Season 5, Volume 1 (2017)

- Contributed 2 tracks: "Won't Back Down" and "On My Way" background vocals with Hayden Panettiere

The Music of Nashville: Season 5, Volume 2 (2017)

- Contributed 2 tracks: "Eye of the Storm" and "You're Mine" with Hayden Panettiere, Connie Britton, Charles Esten, Sam Palladio, Clare Bowen, Chris Carmack, Lennon Stella, Maisy Stella

The Music of Nashville: Season 5, Volume 3 (2017)

- Contributed 2 tracks: "Rose and Thorn" and "Nobody Cares About Your Dreams"

The Music of Nashville: Season 6, Volume 1 (2018)

- Contributed 2 tracks: "Hold On (Not Leaving You Behind)" with Sam Palladio, Rainee Blake, and Chris Carmack and "Love is Loud" with Sam Palladio, Rainee Blake, and Chris Carmack

The Music of Nashville: Season 6, Volume 2 (2018)

- Contributed 3 tracks: "The Giver", "Go" with Sam Palladio, Rainee Blake, and Chris Carmack, and "A Life That's Good" with Hayden Panettiere, Connie Britton, Charles Esten, Sam Palladio, Clare Bowen, Chris Carmack, Lennon Stella, Maisy Stella, and Ronny Cox

== Awards and nominations ==
| Year | Award | Category | Work | Result |
|---|---|---|---|---|
| 1995 | Daytime Emmy Awards | Outstanding Younger Actor in a Drama Series | General Hospital | Won |
| 1995 | Soap Opera Digest Award | Outstanding Child Actor | General Hospital | Won |
| 1995 | YoungStar Award | Best Performance by a Young Actor in a Daytime TV Program | General Hospital | Won |
| 1996 | Daytime Emmy Awards | Outstanding Younger Actor in a Drama Series | General Hospital | Nominated |
| 1996 | Young Artist Award | Best Performance in a Daytime Drama – Young Actor | General Hospital | Nominated |
| 1997 | YoungStar Award | Best Performance by a Young Actor in a Made For TV Movie | The Prisoner of Zenda, Inc. | Nominated |
| 1997 | YoungStar Award | Best Performance by a Young Actor in a Daytime TV Program | General Hospital | Won |
| 1997 | Daytime Emmy Awards | Outstanding Younger Actor in a Drama Series | General Hospital | Nominated |
| 1997 | Young Artist Award | Best Performance in a Daytime Drama – Young Actor | General Hospital | Nominated |
| 1998 | Daytime Emmy Awards | Outstanding Younger Actor in a Drama Series | General Hospital | Won |
| 1998 | YoungStar Award | Best Performance by a Young Actor in a Daytime TV Program | General Hospital | Won |
| 1999 | Daytime Emmy Awards | Outstanding Younger Actor in a Drama Series | General Hospital | Won |
| 1999 | Soap Opera Digest Award | Outstanding Younger Lead Actor | General Hospital | Won |
| 1999 | Young Artist Award | Best Performance in a Daytime Serial | General Hospital | Nominated |
| 1999 | YoungStar Awards | Best Performance by a Young Actor in a Daytime TV Program | General Hospital | Won |
| 1999 | YoungStar Awards | Best Performance by a Young Actor in a Drama Film | The Deep End of the Ocean | Nominated |
| 2000 | Daytime Emmy Awards | Outstanding Younger Actor in a Drama Series | General Hospital | Nominated |
| 2000 | YoungStar Award | Best Performance by a Young Actor in a Daytime TV Program | General Hospital | Nominated |
| 2000 | Young Hollywood Award | Breakthrough Performance – Male | The Deep End of the Ocean | Won |
| 2000 | Brooklyn Film Festival | Festival Award: Best Narrative Short – Drama (with Richard Lee Jackson) | Crystal Clear | Won |
| 2000 | Brooklyn Film Festival | Festival Award: Coen Brothers Award For Duo Filmmakers (with Richard Lee Jackson) | Crystal Clear | Won |
| 2005 | Saturn Award | Best Performance by a Younger Actor | Riding the Bullet | Nominated |
| 2010 | Daytime Emmy Award | Outstanding Supporting Actor in a Drama Series | General Hospital | Nominated |
| 2011 | Daytime Emmy Award | Outstanding Supporting Actor in a Drama Series | General Hospital | Won |
| 2012 | Daytime Emmy Award | Outstanding Supporting Actor in a Drama Series | General Hospital | Won |
| 2016 | Critics' Choice Television Awards | Best Supporting Actor in a Drama Series | Nashville | Nominated |
| 2025 | Daytime Emmy Awards | Outstanding Supporting Actor in a Drama Series | General Hospital | Won |
