= The Prisoner of Zenda, Inc. =

- DVD cover
- Genre: Adventure; Drama
- Screenplay by: Richard Clark; Rodman Gregg
- Directed by: Stefan Scaini
- Starring: Jonathan Jackson; William Shatner; Jay Brazeau; Richard Lee Jackson; Don S. Davis; Katharine Isabelle
- Theme music composer: John Welsman
- Country of origin: United States
- Original language: English

Production
- Producer: Larry Sugar
- Cinematography: Maris H. Jansons
- Editor: Bill Goddard
- Running time: 101 min.
- Production companies: Hallmark Entertainment; Showtime Networks

Original release
- Release: September 1996

The Prisoner of Zenda, Inc. is a 1996 American television film starring Jonathan Jackson, William Shatner, and Don S. Davis. It was produced for Showtime Networks under their family division, and first aired in September 1996. The film was written by Rodman Gregg and Richard Clark.

== Premise ==
The Prisoner of Zenda, Inc. is a contemporary film loosely based on the classic 1937 MGM film starring Ronald Colman and adapted from Anthony Hope's 1894 novel The Prisoner of Zenda. In previous versions, Zenda was the castle in the mythical kingdom of Ruritania, whereas Zenda, Inc. is a computer business empire in this version.

The film continues the theme of mistaken identities central to the plot. Jackson plays Oliver, and his lookalike Rudy (named after Prince Rudolf from the original) is a Star Trek fan — a nod to co-star Shatner.

== Cast ==
- Jonathan Jackson as Rudy and as Oliver
- William Shatner as Michael Gatewick
- Jay Brazeau as Professor Wooley
- Richard Lee Jackson as Douglas Gatewick
- Don S. Davis as Colonel Zapf
- Katharine Isabelle as Fiona
- John Tench as Leon
- Jed Rees as Buddy
- Mark Acheson as Frankie

== Release ==
The film was released on VHS under the renamed title Double Play, but reverted to the original title for the DVD release.
