= Christmas with Nashville =

Compilation album by Various artists
- Released: November 4, 2014
- Genre: Country music, Christmas
- Length: 44:03
- Label: Big Machine Records
- Producer: Jay DeMarcus, Brad Stella

The Music of Nashville chronology
The Music of Nashville: Season 2, Volume 2 (2014)	Christmas with Nashville (2014)	The Music of Nashville: Season 3, Volume 1 (2014)

Christmas with Nashville is an album of Christmas songs recorded by cast members of the series Nashville. It was released digitally and physically (exclusively to Target stores) by Big Machine on November 4, 2014. The album was produced by Jay DeMarcus of Rascal Flatts (with the exception of "Christmas Coming Home," which was produced by Brad Stella).

Unlike the other albums of music from the series, none of the songs included are actually used on the show (with the exception of Connie Britton and Will Chase's rendition of "Baby, It's Cold Outside," which was featured in the episode "Two Sides to Every Story").

== Background ==
Nashville is an American musical drama television series, broadcast on the ABC channel in the United States. Britton and Hayden Panettiere, the show's two leads, were not musical performers prior to the show and rarely perform outside of the episodes, however other cast members have been known to go on tour and perform at locations such as the Grand Ole Opry. A previous recording by the cast, taped during the television concert special Nashville: On The Record had reached number one on both the Billboard Country Albums chart and the all-genre Billboard 200 album chart.

Jay DeMarcus of the band Rascal Flatts, had made a guest appearance on the show during a previous season and become friends with Sam Palladio. DeMarcus subsequently produced Christmas with Nashville, praising the cast whilst doing so, explaining that "I was blown away by the consistent talent level of each actor as they came into the studio, I realized immediately that I was working with gifted singers, as well. They are so meticulous about their craft of acting, and they were just as meticulous about making sure the music was right. Of Panettiere and Britton, he said that "They may not say they're singers, but they are."

== Release ==
Christmas with Nashville was released on November 4, 2014. It was released digitally by record label Big Machine, with an exclusive release on CD via Target stores in the United States.

== Reception ==
=== Critical ===
Darryl Sterden for the Toronto Sun described the album, saying "They aren't really country stars; they just play them on TV. But you'd never know the difference on the Nashville cast's surprisingly solid and satisfying set of countrified Christmas classics." He gave it a rating of two and a half out of three.

=== Commercial ===
The album debuted on the Billboard 200 at No. 105, and peaked at No. 59 on its fifth week of release. The album has sold 43,000 copies in the US as of December 2014.

== Track listing ==
No.	Title	Writer(s)	Performer(s)	Length
1.	"Santa Baby"	Joan Javits, Tony Springer, Philip Springer	Clare Bowen	3:27
2.	"Blue Christmas"	Billy Hayes, Jay W. Johnson	Charles Esten featuring Vince Gill	4:29
3.	"Christmas (Baby Please Come Home)"	Ellie Greenwich, Jeff Barry, Phil Spector	Jonathan Jackson	3:16
4.	"White Christmas"	Irving Berlin	Hayden Panettiere	3:11
5.	"You're a Mean One, Mr. Grinch"	Albert Hague, Theodor S. Geisel	Connie Britton	2:53
6.	"River"	Joni Mitchell	Sam Palladio	4:59
7.	"Baby, It's Cold Outside"	Frank Loesser	Connie Britton and Will Chase	2:56
8.	"Merry Christmas Baby"	Lou Baxter, Johnny Moore	Aubrey Peeples	3:42
9.	"Have Yourself a Merry Little Christmas"	Hugh Martin, Ralph Blane	Chaley Rose	4:29
10.	"Christmas Coming Home"	MaryLynne Stella, Bradley Stella	Lennon & Maisy	2:48
11.	"O Little Town of Bethlehem"	Lewis Redner, Phillips Brooks	Will Chase	4:00
12.	"Celebrate Me Home"	Kenny Loggins, Bob James	Clare Bowen, Connie Britton, Will Chase, Charles Esten, Vince Gill, Jonathan Jackson, Sam Palladio, Hayden Panettiere, Aubrey Peeples, Chaley Rose and Lennon & Maisy	3:40

== Charts ==
=== Weekly charts ===
Chart (2014–15)	Peak position
US Billboard 200	59
US Top Country Albums (Billboard)	8
US Top Holiday Albums (Billboard)	10

=== Year-end charts ===
Chart (2015)	Position
US Top Country Albums (Billboard)	60
