= The Music of Nashville: Season 3, Volume 2 =

Soundtrack album by Various artists
- Released: May 12, 2015
- Genre: Country, Country pop, Country rock
- Length: 56:15 (standard edition)
- Label: Big Machine Records

The Music of Nashville chronology
The Music of Nashville: Season 3, Volume 1 (2014)	The Music of Nashville: Season 3, Volume 2 (2015)	The Music of Nashville: Season 4, Volume 1 (2015)

The Music of Nashville: Season 3, Volume 2 is the sixth soundtrack album for the American musical drama television series Nashville, created by Academy Award winner Callie Khouri and starring Connie Britton as country music superstar Rayna Jaymes and Hayden Panettiere as new star Juliette Barnes. The album was released digitally and (exclusive to Target stores in North America) physically on May 12, 2015 through Big Machine Records.

Although guest star Christina Aguilera's songs "The Real Thing" and "Shotgun" were released as digital singles, neither track appears on the album due to label rights (Aguilera is an RCA artist).

== Track listing ==
Standard edition
No.	Title	Writer(s)	Performer(s)	Length
1.	"Borrow My Heart"	Phillip LaRue, Lia LaRue	Clare Bowen, Jonathan Jackson and Sam Palladio	3:33
2.	"Can’t Help My Heart"	Sarah Buxton, Jedd Hughes, Kevin Griffin	Laura Benanti and Will Chase	3:59
3.	"I’m On It"	Matt Jenkins, Matt Ramsey, Trevor Rosen	Chris Carmack	2:44
4.	"Longer"	Andrea Davidson	Clare Bowen and Sam Palladio	3:27
5.	"This Is Real Life"	Trey Bruce, Derek Cannavo, Maren Morris	Connie Britton and Lennon and Maisy	3:53
6.	"My Heart Don’t Know When To Stop"	Allen Salmon, Shannon Wright	Aubrey Peeples	3:10
7.	"The Rivers Between Us"	Eric Kaz, JD Souther	Connie Britton and Charles Esten	2:52
8.	"I’ve Got You (and You’ve Got Me)"	Jacob Davis, Shelley Skidmore, Bob Moffatt, Clint Moffatt	Lennon and Maisy	2:48
9.	"My Song"	Sarah Siskind, Femke Weidema	Clare Bowen, Jonathan Jackson and Sam Palladio	2:47
10.	"Sad Song"	Ashley Monroe, Matraca Berg	Laura Benanti	2:55
11.	"If I Drink This Beer"	Jonathan Singleton, Brad Tursi	Will Chase	2:58
12.	"Broken Song"	Cody Johnson, Tony Lane, Travis Meadows	Chris Carmack	3:42
13.	"Hold You In My Arms"	Sarah Siskind	Jonathan Jackson and Hayden Panettiere	1:47
14.	"Mississippi Flood"	Tofer Brown, Lucie Silvas, Jamie Floyd	Hayden Panettiere	3:02
15.	"This Is What I Need To Say"	Sarah Siskind	Jonathan Jackson	2:55
16.	"Heart On Fire"	Sarah Buxton, Blair Daly, Kate York	Lennon and Maisy	3:17
17.	"I Found A Way"	Shannon Wright, Adam Wright	Aubrey Peeples	2:31
18.	"Have A Little Faith In Me"	John Hiatt	Will Chase and Maisy Stella	3:55
Total length:				56:15

Target deluxe tracks
No.	Title	Writer(s)	Artist	Length
19.	"One By One"	Nicole Johnson, Josh Johnson	Jonathan Jackson and Hayden Panettiere	4:04
20.	"Novocaine"	Cary Barlowe, Steven Lee Olson, Caitlin Smith	Laura Benanti and Jonathan Jackson	3:50

== Commercial performance ==
The album debuted on the Top Country Albums chart at No. 3, and Billboard 200 at No. 28, selling 12,200 copies in the US for the week.

== Charts ==
Chart (2015)	Peak position
US Billboard 200	28
US Top Country Albums (Billboard)	3
US Soundtrack Albums (Billboard)	3
