= The Music of Nashville: Season 2, Volume 2 =

Soundtrack album by Various artists
- Released: May 6, 2014
- Genres: Country, Country pop, Country rock
- Length: 37:24 (standard edition), 58:07 (Target deluxe edition), 72:59 (Target deluxe edition with bonus tracks)
- Label: Big Machine Records
- Producer: Various, Michael Knox

The Music of Nashville chronology
The Music of Nashville: Season 2, Volume 1 (2013)	The Music of Nashville: Season 2, Volume 2 (2014)	Christmas with Nashville (2014)

The Music of Nashville: Season 2, Volume 2 is the fourth soundtrack album for the American musical drama television series Nashville, created by Academy Award winner Callie Khouri and starring Connie Britton as country music superstar Rayna Jaymes and Hayden Panettiere as new star Juliette Barnes. The album was released on May 6, 2014 through Big Machine Records.

Unlike the previous volumes, the Target deluxe edition contains nearly twice as many tracks as the standard edition; they are interspersed throughout the album rather than added to the standard album's listing. The UK release, again unlike the previous volumes, contains all 21 tracks listed below rather than conforming to the standard edition.

The album's biggest hits are "Black Roses" by Clare Bowen and Hayden Panettiere's "Don't Put Dirt on my Grave Just Yet". Although the latter failed to chart officially, "Don't Put Dirt on my Grave Just Yet" appeared on the iTunes chart, likely peaking its position somewhere in the seventies.

== Track listing ==
Standard edition
No.	Title	Writer(s)	Performer(s)	Length
1.	"He Ain’t Gonna Change"	Al Anderson, Karyn Rochelle	Connie Britton and Hayden Panettiere	3:33
2.	"I Ain’t Leavin’ Without Your Love"	Justin Davis, Sarah Zimmermann, Cary Barlowe	Sam Palladio, Chaley Rose and Jonathan Jackson	2:45
3.	"Believing"	Emily Shackelton, Kate York, Tami Hinesh	Charles Esten and Lennon & Maisy	3:16
4.	"It's On Tonight"	Dustin Lynch, Brett Beavers, David Lee Murphy	Will Chase, Chris Carmack and Charles Esten	3:43
5.	"Lately"	Sarah Siskind, Sally Barris, Ashley Monroe	Sam Palladio and Clare Bowen	3:45
6.	"Joy Parade"	Jill Andrews, Josh Leo	Lennon and Maisy	3:10
7.	"It All Slows Down"	Karyn Rochelle, Sarah Siskind	Aubrey Peeples	3:09
8.	"Is That Who I Am"	Aaron Benward, Shaun Shankel, Steve Moakler	Chris Carmack	4:26
9.	"This Time"	Allison Moorer, Jeffrey Steele	Connie Britton	2:53
10.	"Black Roses"	Lucy Schwartz	Clare Bowen	3:43
11.	"Don’t Put Dirt On My Grave Just Yet"	Trent Dabbs, Caitlyn Smith	Hayden Panettiere	3:09

Target deluxe edition
No.	Title	Writer(s)	Performer(s)	Length
1.	"He Ain’t Gonna Change"	Al Anderson, Karyn Rochelle	Connie Britton and Hayden Panettiere	3:33
2.	"I Ain’t Leavin’ Without Your Love"	Justin Davis, Sarah Zimmermann, Cary Barlowe	Sam Palladio, Chaley Rose and Jonathan Jackson	2:45
3.	"Believing"	Emily Shackelton, Kate York, Tami Hinesh	Charles Esten and Lennon & Maisy	3:16
4.	"Hurtin' On Me"	Josh Osborne, Greg Bates, Shane McAnally	Chris Carmack	3:28
5.	"Lately"	Sarah Siskind, Sally Barris, Ashley Monroe	Sam Palladio and Clare Bowen	3:45
6.	"Wrong For The Right Reasons"	Rosi Golan, Natalie Hemby, Chris DeStefano	Connie Britton	3:19
7.	"Everything I'll Ever Need"	Kate York, Dylan Altman	Hayden Panettiere and Jonathan Jackson	2:18
8.	"Joy Parade"	Jill Andrews, Josh Leo	Lennon & Maisy	3:10
9.	"Come Find Me"	Sarah Buxton, John Scott Sherill	Clare Bowen	4:34
10.	"It's On Tonight"	Dustin Lynch, Brett Beavers, David Lee Murphy	Will Chase, Chris Carmack and Charles Esten	3:43
11.	"Hennessee"	Joel King, Ricky Young, Eli Wulfmeier, Taylor Burns, Chris Hennessee	Sam Palladio, Jonathan Jackson and Chaley Rose	3:26
12.	"It All Slows Down"	Karyn Rochelle, Sarah Siskind	Aubrey Peeples	3:09
13.	"Is That Who I Am"	Aaron Benward, Shaun Shankel, Steve Moakler	Chris Carmack	4:26
14.	"This Time"	Allison Moorer, Jeffrey Steele	Connie Britton	2:53
15.	"Black Roses"	Lucy Schwartz	Clare Bowen	3:44
16.	"Don't Put Dirt On My Grave Just Yet"	Trent Dabbs, Caitlyn Smith	Hayden Panettiere	3:09
17.	"A Life That's Good"	Sarah Siskind	Connie Britton, Charles Esten and Lennon and Maisy	3:30

Target exclusive tracks
No.	Title	Writer(s)	Performer(s)	Length
18.	"Carry You Home"	Troy Verges, Caitlyn Smith, Gordie Sampson	Chaley Rose	4:00
19.	"Then I Was Loved By You (Full Band Version)"	Kalisa Ewing, Casey Wood	Chris Carmack	4:20
20.	"Falling"	Gareth Dunlop, Kim Richey	Clare Bowen	3:23
21.	"Don’t Put Dirt On My Grave Just Yet (Orchestral Version)"	Trent Dabbs, Caitlyn Smith	Hayden Panettiere	3:12

== Charts ==
=== Weekly charts ===
Chart (2014)	Peak position
US Billboard 200	13
US Top Country Albums (Billboard)	4
US Soundtrack Albums (Billboard)	2

=== Year-end charts ===
Chart (2014)	Position
US Soundtrack Albums (Billboard)	25
