= The Music of Nashville: Season 4, Volume 1 =

Soundtrack album by Various artists
- Released: December 4, 2015
- Genre: Country; country pop; country rock
- Label: Big Machine Records

The Music of Nashville chronology
| The Music of Nashville: Season 3, Volume 2 (2015) | The Music of Nashville: Season 4, Volume 1 (2015) | The Music of Nashville: Season 4, Volume 2 (2016) |

The Music of Nashville: Season 4, Volume 1 is the seventh soundtrack from the American musical drama television series Nashville, created by Academy Award winner Callie Khouri and starring Connie Britton as country music superstar Rayna Jaymes and Hayden Panettiere as Juliette Barnes. The album was released on December 4, 2015, digitally and (exclusively through Target in North America) physically.

The album debuted at No. 170 on the Billboard 200, No. 6 on Soundtrack Albums, selling 5,200 copies in the first week.

== Track listing ==
Standard edition
| No. | Title | Writer(s) | Performer(s) | Length |
|---|---|---|---|---|
| 1. | "Like New" | Sarah Zimmerman, Justin Davis, Jonathan Singleton | Charles Esten | 3:13 |
| 2. | "Beyond the Sun" | Claire Guerreso, Aaron Espe | Lennon Stella | 3:08 |
| 3. | "Holding on to What I Can't Hold" | Steve Robson, Travis Meadows | Mark Collie | 3:32 |
| 4. | "Too Far From You" | Sarah Siskind | Aubrey Peeples | 3:35 |
| 5. | "Plenty Far to Fall" | Garrison Starr, Alex Dezen, Sandy Chila | Clare Bowen and Sam Palladio | 2:21 |
| 6. | "Crazy" | Willie Nelson | Steven Tyler and Hayden Panettiere | 2:25 |
| 7. | "Spinning Revolver" | Sean McConnell, Ashley Ray | Will Chase | 3:28 |
| 8. | "Sleep Tonight (A Lullaby)" | Lucy Schwartz, John Hanson, Steve Pasch | Chris Carmack and Jonathan Jackson | 3:06 |
| 9. | "In the Name of Your Love" | Sean McConnell | Riley Smith | 3:33 |
| 10. | "Run With Me" | Al Anderson, Adam Sanders | Chris Carmack | 3:11 |
| 11. | "Speak to Me" | Lucy Schwartz, Sarah Siskind, Tofer Brown | Clare Bowen | 4:11 |
| 12. | "I Want to (Do Everything for You)" | Joe Tex | Connie Britton and Riley Smith | 2:23 |
| 13. | "History of My Heart" | Chris Gelbuda, Kylie Sackley | Jonathan Jackson | 3:20 |
| 14. | "What If It's You" | Scott Effman, Lily Elise, Audra Mae | Hayden Panettiere | 4:01 |
| 15. | "Count on Me" | Guerreso, Viktor Krauss | Sam Palladio | 3:27 |
| 16. | "Rockin' & Rollin'" | Levi Hummon, Sean McConnell | Lennon & Maisy Stella | 3:15 |
| 17. | "Take My Hand, Precious Lord" | Thomas A. Dorsey | Chaley Rose | 2:33 |

== Charts ==
| Chart (2015) | Peak position |
|---|---|
| US Billboard 200 | 170 |
| US Top Country Albums (Billboard) | 17 |
| US Soundtrack Albums (Billboard) | 6 |
