= The Music of Nashville: Season 4, Volume 2 =

Soundtrack album by Various artists
- Released: May 13, 2016
- Genre: Country; country pop; country rock
- Length: 57:27
- Label: Big Machine Records
- Producer: Buddy Miller; Callie Khouri; Steve Buchanan

The Music of Nashville chronology
| The Music of Nashville: Season 4, Volume 1 (2015) | The Music of Nashville: Season 4, Volume 2 (2016) | The Music of Nashville: Season 5, Volume 1 (2017) |

The Music of Nashville: Season 4, Volume 2 is the eighth original soundtrack from the American musical drama television series Nashville, created by Academy Award winner Callie Khouri and starring Connie Britton as country music superstar Rayna Jaymes and Hayden Panettiere as Juliette Barnes. The album was released digitally on May 13, 2016, and on compact disc exclusively through Target in North America. The album reached number 2 on the UK country charts. This album also marks the final release with the show's association with ABC/Disney, as the show moved to CMT for its 5th season.

== Track listing ==
| No. | Title | Writer(s) | Performer(s) | Length |
|---|---|---|---|---|
| 1. | "Can't Say No To Love" | Gabe Dixon, Rose Falcon, Joe Ginsberg | Will Chase | 3:19 |
| 2. | "Soul Survivor" | Barry Dean, Natalie Hemby, Luke Laird | Aubrey Peeples and Jonathan Jackson | 3:51 |
| 3. | "Only Tennessee" | Claire Guerreso, Daniel Tashian | Clare Bowen | 3:14 |
| 4. | "Kinda Dig The Feeling" | Tyler Bryant, Tom Douglas, Jaren Johnston | Jonathan Jackson | 2:36 |
| 5. | "Swept Away" | Jarrod Gorbel, Audra Mae, Blake Sennett | Lennon Stella and Jessy Schram | 3:40 |
| 6. | "Moving On Never Felt So Good" | Gareth John Owen Dunlop | Chris Carmack | 3:49 |
| 7. | "From Here On Out" | Andy Albert, Timothy James Bowen, Stephanie Lambring | Charles Esten | 4:07 |
| 8. | "The Rubble" | Justin Davis, Paul Moak, Sarah Zimmerman | Clare Bowen and Sam Palladio | 2:53 |
| 9. | "Hole In The World" | Katrina Elam, Steve McEwan, Gordie Sampson | Hayden Panettiere | 3:31 |
| 10. | "'Til The Stars Come Out Again" | Justin Glasco, Garrison Starr | Maisy Stella | 2:29 |
| 11. | "Caged Bird" | Maren Morris, Tina Parol | Aubrey Peeples | 3:49 |
| 12. | "One Place Too Long" | Haley Cole, Bobby Hamrick | Hayden Panettiere | 3:02 |
| 13. | "Ain't It Beautiful" | Michael Dulaney, Sean McConnell, Lee Thomas Miller | Chris Carmack | 3:34 |
| 14. | "Wild Card" | Rosi Golan, Claire Guerreso, Daniel Tashian | Lennon Stella | 3:16 |
| 15. | "Boomtown" | Ryan Hurd, Maren Morris, Gordie Sampson | Hayden Panettiere and Will Chase | 3:46 |
| 16. | "All We Ever Wanted" | Matraca Berg, Kate York | Lennon & Maisy Stella | 2:46 |
| 17. | "Hold On To Me" | Bob Moffatt, Clint Moffatt, Summer Overstreet | Connie Britton | 3:45 |
| Total length: | | | | 57:27 |
