= Trapped in a Purple Haze =

2000 American television film

- DVD cover
- Genre: Crime drama; Sport
- Written by: Mimi Schmir
- Directed by: Eric Laneuville
- Starring: Jonathan Jackson; Carly Pope; JoBeth Williams; Robin Dunne
- Music by: Lauren Scheff; Brian Tyler
- Country of origin: United States
- Original language: English

Production
- Executive producer: Thomas Carter
- Producers: Richard M. Rothstein; Christine A. Sacani; Jana Fain; Gigi Coello-Bannon
- Production location: Toronto
- Cinematography: Nikos Evdemon
- Editor: Sabrina Plisco
- Running time: 90 minutes
- Production companies: ABC; Thomas Carter Company; Pearson Television International

Original release
- Network: ABC
- Release: April 17, 2000

Trapped in a Purple Haze is a drama television film about drug abuse which originally aired on ABC in 2000; its title is a reference to the Jimi Hendrix song "Purple Haze". The film starred Jonathan Jackson, JoBeth Williams, and Carly Pope, with a supporting role by Hayden Christensen (who eventually beat Jackson for the part of Anakin Skywalker in the Star Wars prequel trilogy).

== Plot ==
Chicago college student Max Hanson (Jackson) is a talented artist and hockey player. Though more interested in the latter, he is under pressure from his mother, Sophie (Williams) to pursue a career in art, influenced by the fact that she put her own career aside to raise the family and has just landed a coveted position with a local art gallery. Max's father, Ed (Colm Feore), is a tax attorney with a more laid-back approach to his son's future, just wanting him to be happy.

While working at the local video store with best friends Orin (Christensen) and Kate (Amy Stewart), a cute girl comes in with her friends seeking a copy of Arachnophobia, and Max is immediately smitten. After locating her on campus the next day, she introduces herself as Molly White (Pope), who already knows Max's name from his hockey jersey. She then gives Max her phone number and invites him to a party she's attending that night. Before long, Max and Molly are becoming an item, the two even managing to make love in his bedroom with his mother and younger sister Chloe in the house. However, Max soon finds out that Molly is a drug addict, as he accompanies her on a trek to score some heroin, which she promptly snorts.

Max invites Molly to Chloe's birthday party, and though she initially refuses to attend because it's the same night as a Smashing Pumpkins concert, she later relents. However, a minor argument erupts between her and Sophie, resulting in Molly leaving abruptly and putting the brakes on their budding relationship. Devastated, Max does his best to move on, but has a hard time doing so. Finally, he's taken to a party one night by Orin and Kate, where he promptly spots Molly. She asks if they can go somewhere and talk; he accepts, she apologizes, and the two make up.

The next day, Max visits Sophie at work and tries to express his feelings about Molly, but her response is less than positive. A short time later, Molly celebrates their new-found relationship by having them shoot up together in her apartment, and Max soon becomes hooked, neglecting his studies and job. Soon thereafter, Molly learns that she's three months behind on rent, and has a week to pay before being evicted. Not having enough money in his bank account to pay it, Max goes to the video store to get his paycheck, but having only worked two hours during the past week, that's all the pay he receives, and he is also given a pink slip. Sensing his friend may be in over his head, Orin offers to try to help Max, but all he wants is money to supposedly "fix the car" (though Orin sees right through this flimsy claim).

After returning home, Max takes $200 from Ed's wallet; when he gently attempts to approach the subject with his son, even offering to help him out of his financial situation, an argument erupts that culminates in Sophie striking Max. Feeling as though he can never go back home, Max and Molly (who was kicked out of her place) move in with her druggie friends. Not long after, Max shows up at the ice rink attempting to steal money from Orin in the locker room, but is caught in the act (during which time we learn Max has been kicked off the team).

Once back at the pad, Max catches Molly having sex with a man in exchange for drugs, and physically confronts him. Later, as their financial situation worsens, the couple is reduced to panhandling at the local mall, where Sophie spots Max, but says nothing until a few days later. After hearing this news, Ed and his other son Brian attempt to find Max, but are unsuccessful.

His addiction now totally out of control, Max tries to rob a local comic book store for drug money, but is caught by the police. Ed and Brian later bail Max out, and while Brian thinks he needs to be put into rehab, Ed insists he can take care of Max at home. However, the effects of withdrawal are in full swing, and it proves to be an uphill battle. Finally, after going into a rage, Max becomes unconscious and is taken to a hospital.

Once there, an arguments erupts between Ed and Sophie, with Sophie insisting that she did what anyone else would have done, but Ed retorts "that's a bunch of crap" and reminds her that neither he nor the kids made her stop painting; she did it all by herself, and that in her self-absorbed attitude, she failed to notice that all Max wanted was "to know it was OK to not be perfect".

The next day, a doctor informs the family that Max needs to get into a treatment program, but stresses the difficulty of doing so. However, while this discussion takes place, Max manages to slip out of the hospital and begins frantically searching for Molly, finally finding her in a sleazy motel room where she has died of a heroin overdose. Out of his mind with grief, Max shows up at Kate's apartment and begs her for money; when she refuses, he accuses her of "wanting" him and offers to prostitute himself. Enraged, Kate throws Max out of the apartment, but in his stupor, he takes a tumble down the stairwell.

The following morning, after his family had searched unsuccessfully for him, Max is brought home in a taxi, Kate by his side. Informing his mother of Molly's death, the two tearfully embrace, and as he prepares to leave for his month-long stay in rehab, he and Sophie finally reach an understanding. Sophie admits that she never saw Max for who he was and encourages him to be whatever he wants, telling Max that she loves him as the two embrace again. The film ends with Max saying goodbye to Brian and Chloe as he departs for rehab, before he and Ed drive away.

== DVD release ==
The film was released on DVD in the United Kingdom, first in 2004 by Oddysey Video, and again in 2007 by Infinity Vid.

Although the film never received a DVD release in the United States, it has been widely rerun on both Lifetime and its sister channel Lifetime Movie Network in the years since its original airing.
