= Chris Carmack =

American actor, singer and former model (born 1980)

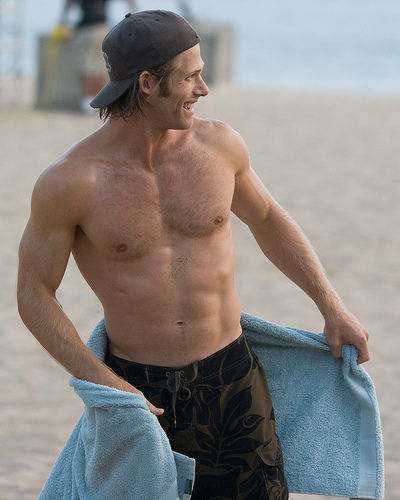
- Carmack in 2008
- Born: James Christopher Carmack; December 22, 1980 (age 45); Washington, D.C., U.S.
- Education: New York University
- Occupations: Actor; singer; model
- Years active: 2000–present
- Spouse: Erin Slaver (m. 2018)
- Children: 2

James Christopher Carmack (born December 22, 1980) is an American actor, singer, and former fashion model. He is known for his roles in popular television shows—the teen drama series The O.C. (2003–2004) as Luke Ward, the country music drama Nashville as Will Lexington (2012–2018), and the medical drama Grey's Anatomy (2018–present) as Dr. Atticus "Link" Lincoln.

Carmack has also appeared in films, including The Butterfly Effect 3: Revelations, Into the Blue 2: The Reef, Love Wrecked, Beauty & the Briefcase and Alpha and Omega.

== Early life and education ==
Carmack was born on December 22, 1980 in Washington D.C. He was born James Christopher Carmack and grew up in Derwood, Maryland. He has a brother and a sister. As a young boy, he played baseball, basketball, and football at Magruder High School. However, his attentions turned to theater and he began working on three productions per year, on-stage and off, in addition to competing in numerous drama festivals.

== Career ==
After graduation, Carmack attended New York University to pursue an arts degree at the Tisch School. He left NYU after he was discovered by John Yannella, a modeling scout, and decided to have a go at the profession. His looks were exactly what Bruce Weber was seeking for Abercrombie & Fitch. The other catalogs and editorials that he has worked for include: Lord and Taylor, Macy's, Target, Who.A.U, Elle France, Nautica, Guess?, and Cosmogirl.

He played Luke on the first season of The O.C., but did not continue because producers could not guarantee him airtime in the upcoming year. In 2005, Carmack became a model for Ezra Fitch, a limited upscale label sold at Abercrombie & Fitch.

In 2006, Carmack starred in the film Lovewrecked with Amanda Bynes and Jonathan Bennett and honed his acting skills in the theaters of New York and London.

From March 16 to May 21, 2006 Carmack starred in the Off-Broadway production of Entertaining Mr. Sloane at the Laura Pels Theatre. The play, directed by Scott Ellis, also featured Tony Award nominees Alec Baldwin and Jan Maxwell.

In 2006, Carmack made his London stage debut in a rare revival of Tennessee Williams' Summer and Smoke, a play that had not been performed in London for 55 years. Carmack starred opposite Rosamund Pike and was directed by former Royal Shakespeare Company artistic director Adrian Noble. It played the Apollo Theatre from October 21 – November 25, 2006, failing to complete its scheduled run.

Carmack portrayed Susan Delfino's cousin Tim in the television show Desperate Housewives for one episode.

Carmack portrayed Sam Reide, the main character of the film The Butterfly Effect 3: Revelations, the third film in The Butterfly Effect film franchise, released in theaters in January 2009. He also made his first voice role in Alpha and Omega, which was released in theaters in September 17, 2010, and reprised his role as Garth in Alpha and Omega 2: A Howl-iday Adventure, being one of the few actors from the original to appear in at least one sequel.

In 2013, Carmack was cast in the ABC drama series Nashville as Scarlett and Gunnar's neighbor Will, a sexy and charming country singer and guitar player. Carmack's character initially appeared to be a womanizer and a potential threat to Scarlett and Gunnar's relationship, but it was revealed that the character is gay, and trying to protect his image as a heterosexual country music heartthrob. Carmack appeared in the final six episodes of the season, and was promoted from a recurring role to a series regular for season 2.

In 2018, Carmack was cast as Dr. Atticus "Link" Lincoln on the ABC hit medical drama Grey's Anatomy.

In 2019, Carmack made his Hollywood Bowl debut playing the role of Rapunzel's Prince in the show Into the Woods.

== Personal life ==
Carmack announced his engagement to Erin Slaver on March 2, 2016. They married on October 20, 2018. Their first daughter was born in August 2016, and a second daughter was born in May 2022.

== Filmography ==
=== Film ===
Year	Title	Role	Notes
2004	Bring It On Again	Todd	
2005	Love Wrecked	Jason Masters	
2006	Just My Luck	David Pennington	Uncredited
2007	Suburban Girl	Jed Hanson	
2008	H2O Extreme	Austin	
2009	The Butterfly Effect 3: Revelations	Sam Reide	
2009	Into the Blue 2: The Reef	Sebastian White	
2010	Alpha and Omega	Garth	Voice role
2011	Shark Night	Dennis	
2012	Dark Power	Durant	
2013	Alpha and Omega 2: A Howl-iday Adventure	Garth	Voice Role; Direct-to-video film
2015	The Dust Storm	David	
2025	The Stranger in My Home	Tom Truby	on Prime

=== Television ===
Year	Title	Role	Notes
2000	Strangers with Candy	Laird	Episode: "Invisible Love"
2003	Player$	Himself	Episode: "Voodoo That You Do... with Hobbits!"
2003–2004	The O.C.	Luke Ward	Main role (season 1); special guest (season 2); 21 episodes
2004	The Last Ride	Matthew Rondell	Television film
2005	Beach Girls	Cooper Morgenthal	Television miniseries
2005	Smallville	Geoff Johns	Episode: "Recruit"
2005	Jake in Progress	Jared Rush	Episode: "Ubusy?"
2005–2006	Related	Alex Brody	Recurring role, 11 episodes
2007	CSI: Miami	Cole Telford	Episode: "Kill Switch"
2007	Higglytown Heroes	Referee Hero	Episode: "Little Big Fish / Good Sports"
2008	Desperate Housewives	Tim Bremmer	Episode: "Sunday"
2008	CSI: NY	Colby Duncan	Episode: "Forbidden Fruit"
2009	NCIS	Kevin Nelson	Episode: "Love & War"
2009	Drop Dead Diva	Brian	Episode: "Crazy"
2010	Beauty & the Briefcase	Liam	Television film
2010	Deadly Honeymoon	Trevor Forrest	Television film
2011	Grace	Dylan Doran	Television film
2012	A Christmas Wedding Date	Chad	Television film
2012	All About Christmas Eve	Aidan Green	Television film
2012	Bad Girls	Troy Gibson	Unaired pilot
2013–2018	Nashville	Will Lexington	Recurring role (season 1); main role (seasons 2–6)
2018–present	Grey's Anatomy	Dr. Atticus "Link" Lincoln	Recurring role (season 15); main role (season 16–present)
2023	That's My Jam (UK)	Himself	Music game show, episode 1x05
2023	Time for Her to Come Home for Christmas	Matthew	Television film

=== Video games ===
Year	Title	Role	Notes
2015	Final Fantasy Type-0 HD	Quon Yobatz	Voice role

== Theater credits ==
Year	Title	Role	Venue	Notes
2006	Entertaining Mr Sloane	Sloane	Laura Pels Theatre	Off-Broadway
2006	Summer and Smoke	John Buchanan Jr.	Apollo Theatre	West End
2019	Into the Woods	Rapunzel's Prince	Hollywood Bowl	

== Discography ==
=== EPs ===
- Stonewall (2020)

Life on Eris - 5 Songs with Erin Slaver

- Pieces of You (2015)

Nashville, Season 6: Episode 1 (2018)

- Contributed 1 track: "Don't Come Easy"

Nashville, Season 6: Episode 2 (2018)

- Contributed 2 tracks: "Stop the World (And Let Me Off)" with Sam Palladio and Jonathan Jackson and "Right Where You Want Me" with Sam Palladio

Nashville, Season 6: Episode 4 (2018)

- Contributed 2 tracks: "Tearin Up My Heart" with Sam Palladio and Jonathan Jackson and "My Arms" with Sam Palladio and Jonathan Jackson

Nashville, Season 6: Episode 5 (2018)

- Contributed 2 tracks: "Go With It" with Sam Palladio, Jonathan Jackson, and Rainee Blake and "Hold On (Not Leaving You Behind)" with Sam Palladio, Jonathan Jackson, and Rainee Blake

Nashville, Season 6: Episode 6 (2018)

- Contributed 1 track: "Love is Loud" with Sam Palladio, Jonathan Jackson, and Rainee Blake

Nashville, Season 6: Episode 7 (2018)

- Contributed 1 track: "Smoking the Boys" with Sam Palladio, Jonathan Jackson, and Rainee Blake

Nashville, Season 6: Episode 8 (2018)

- Contributed 1 track: "Hard Days" with Sam Palladio, Jonathan Jackson, and Rainee Blake

Nashville, Season 6: Episode 9 (2018)

- Contributed 1 track: "My Turn"

Nashville, Season 6: Episode 10 (2018)

- Contributed 1 track: "Go" with Sam Palladio, Jonathan Jackson, and Rainee Blake

Nashville, Season 6: Episode 16 (2018)

- Contributed 1 track: "A Life That's Good" with Sam Palladio, Rainee Blake, and Jonathan Jackson, and "A Life That's Good" with Hayden Panettiere, Connie Britton, Charles Esten, Sam Palladio, Clare Bowen, Jonathan Jackson, Lennon Stella, Maisy Stella, and Ronny Cox

=== Soundtrack ===
The Music of Nashville: Season 1, Volume 2 (2013)

- Contributed 1 track: "You Ain't Dolly (And You Ain't Porter)" with Clare Bowen

The Music of Nashville: Season 2, Volume 1 (2013)

- Contributed 2 tracks: "What If I Was Willing" and "Can't Say No To You" with Hayden Panettiere

The Music of Nashville: Season 2, Volume 2 (2014)

- Contributed 4 tracks: "It's On Tonight" with Will Chase and Charles Esten, "Is That Who I Am", "Hurtin' On You" and "Then I Was Loved By You"

Nashville: On the Record (2014)

- Contributed 2 tracks: "It's On Tonight" with Will Chase and Charles Esten and "A Life That's Good" with the Nashville cast

The Music of Nashville: Season 3, Volume 1 (2014)

- Contributed 2 tracks: "If It's Love" and "If Your Heart Can Handle It" with Aubrey Peeples

Nashville: On the Record Volume 2 (2015)

- Contributed 3 tracks: "If I Drink This Beer" with Will Chase, "If Your Heart Can Handle It" with Aubrey Peeples and "Friend of Mine" with the Nashville cast

The Music of Nashville: Season 3, Volume 2 (2015)

- Contributed 2 tracks: "I'm On It" and "Broken Song"

The Music of Nashville: Season 4, Volume 1 (2015)

- Contributed 2 tracks: "Sleep Tonight (A Lullaby)" with Jonathan Jackson and "Run With Me"

Nashville: On the Record Volume 3 (2016)

- Contributed 2 tracks: "Being Alone" and "And Then We're Gone" with the Nashville cast

The Music of Nashville: Season 4, Volume 2 (2016)

- Contributed 2 tracks: "Moving On Never Felt So Good" and "Ain't it Beautiful"

The Music of Nashville: Season 5, Volume 1 (2017)

- Contributed 1 track: "Burn to Dark"

The Music of Nashville: Season 5, Volume 2 (2017)

- Contributed 1 track: "By Your Side"

The Music of Nashville: Season 5, Volume 3 (2017)

- Contributed 2 tracks: "Stand Up" and "Little Darlin'" with Clare Bowen

The Music of Nashville: Season 6, Volume 1 (2018)

- Contributed 2 tracks: "Hold On (Not Leaving You Behind)" with Sam Palladio, Rainee Blake, and Jonathan Jackson and "Love is Loud" with Sam Palladio, Rainee Blake, and Chris Carmack

The Music of Nashville: Season 6, Volume 2 (2018)

- Contributed 3 tracks: "My Turn", "Go" with Sam Palladio, Rainee Blake, and Jonathan Jackson, and "A Life That's Good" with Hayden Panettiere, Connie Britton, Charles Esten, Sam Palladio, Clare Bowen, Jonathan Jackson, Lennon Stella, Maisy Stella, and Ronny Cox

=== Singles ===
Year	Single	Sales	Album
2013	"What If I Was Willing"	4,000	The Music of Nashville: Season 2 Volume 1
2015	"Being Alone"		Pieces of You

=== Tours ===
- Nashville in Concert (2014)
