= Lisa Vultaggio =

Canadian actress

- Born: Vancouver, British Columbia, Canada
- Occupation: Actress
- Years active: 1991 - 2001
- Spouse: Jonathan Jackson (m. 2002)
- Children: 3

Lisa Vultaggio is a Canadian former actress. She is best known for her role as Hannah Scott on General Hospital.

== Personal life ==
Vultaggio was born in Vancouver, British Columbia of Italian descent. She was inspired to take up acting after watching Franco Zeffirelli's Romeo and Juliet. She studied at the Breck Academy in Vancouver.

In 1999, she met actor Jonathan Jackson on the set of General Hospital. They married on June 21, 2002. They have three children: Caleb (b. June 21, 2003), Adora (b. 2005), and Titus Gabriel (b. October 7, 2010).

== Career ==
Her first acting role was in an episode of Street Justice, soon followed by an appearance in Working It Out at Madison, a Canadian series filmed between 1991 and 1993 which was intended to be a learning aid for teenagers when it came to handling the pressures of TV life. Her first film appearance was in the television film Mortal Sins, alongside Christopher Reeve. She landed a string of television roles, making guest appearances in The X-Files, Millennium, and Highlander, among others. She also pursued a career in singing, and after five years of training landed a record deal in Vancouver. However, she canceled this after making a decision to move to Los Angeles in order to further her acting career.

In 1998, she auditioned for the character of Raquel Dion Santos in the soap opera All My Children. She failed to get the part, but just four months later landed the role of Hannah in General Hospital.

== Filmography ==
- 1991: Street Justice as Cristina Valens (1 episode)
- 1992: A Killer Among Friends as Susan title
- 1992: Mortal Sins as Nina Croce
- 1992: Neon Rider as Callie (1 episode)
- 1993: The Commish as Raquel (1 episode)
- 1993: For the Love of My Child: The Anissa Ayala Story as Jennie
- 1993: Highlander as Carmen
- 1993: Madison as Jenna (2 episodes)
- 1994: Highlander as Elda Gutierrez
- 1994: Green Dolphin Beat as Carmen
- 1994: The X-Files as Elizabeth 'Liz' Hawley (episode: "Beyond the Sea")
- 1995: Lonesome Dove: The Outlaw Years as Fiona (2 episodes)
- 1995: Murder, She Wrote as Adrianna Bonelli (1 episode)
- 1996: Millennium as Janice Sterling (1 episode)
- 1997: Two as Linda van Manen (1 episode)
- 1999-2001: General Hospital as Hannah Scott
