= Connie Britton =

American actress (born 1967)

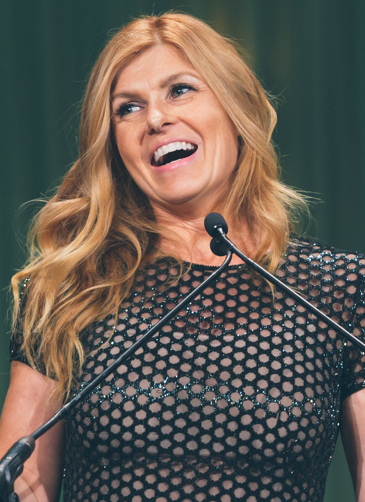
- Britton in 2016
- Born: Constance Elaine Womack; March 6, 1967 (age 59); Boston, Massachusetts, U.S.
- Education: Dartmouth College (BA)
- Occupation: Actress
- Years active: 1995–present
- Spouse: John Britton (m. 1991; div. 1995)
- Children: 1

Connie Britton (born Constance Elaine Womack; March 6, 1967) is an American actress. Her accolades include nominations for five Primetime Emmy Awards and two Golden Globe Awards. She gained prominence for her roles in the television series Spin City (1996–2000), The West Wing (2001), and 24 (2006). Further recognition came for starring as Tami Taylor in Friday Night Lights (2006–2011), Vivien Harmon in American Horror Story: Murder House (2011), and Rayna Jaymes in Nashville (2012–2018). Her other television projects include Dirty John (2018–2019), The White Lotus (2021), and Zero Day (2025).

In film, she has featured in The Brothers McMullen (1995), Beatriz at Dinner (2017), Promising Young Woman (2020), and Luckiest Girl Alive (2022). Beyond acting, she is an advocate for women's rights and served as a Goodwill Ambassador for the United Nations Development Programme.

== Early life and education ==
Britton was born Constance Elaine Womack in Boston, Massachusetts, to Linda Jane (née Cochran) and Edgar Allen Womack, Jr., who was a physicist and an energy company executive. She spent her early years in Rockville, Maryland.

When she was seven years old, she moved with her parents and her fraternal twin sister, Cynthia, to Lynchburg, Virginia, where she attended E. C. Glass High School and performed in plays in the E. C. Glass High School Theater; her photo is displayed in the E. C. Glass Alumni Theater. She majored in Asian studies with a concentration in Chinese at Dartmouth College, and studied at the Beijing Normal University during her freshman summer with Kirsten Gillibrand, who was later elected to the United States Senate. After graduating in 1989, Britton (then Womack) moved to New York City, where she spent two years at the Neighborhood Playhouse School of the Theatre studying with Sanford Meisner.

== Career ==
=== 1995–2005: Early work ===
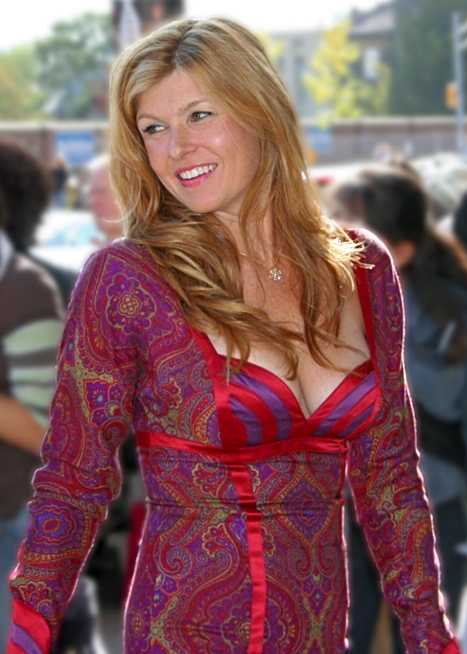
Britton at the 2006 Toronto International Film Festival

While studying at the Neighborhood Playhouse, Britton (then Womack) made her New York theatrical debut in Caroline Kava's The Early Girl at The Courtyard Playhouse. Britton played seasoned prostitute Laurel opposite Cooper Lawrence, who played Joan. Britton's performance, while well received, nearly got her ousted from the Neighborhood Playhouse program, which prohibited students from taking professional employment during their course of study. After graduating, Britton spent two more years working in off-Broadway theatre productions. In 1995, Britton made her feature film debut in Edward Burns's comedy-drama The Brothers McMullen. She moved to Los Angeles after the film's success.

After The Brothers McMullen, Britton was cast as Heather in a recurring role in the ABC sitcom Ellen, and starred as Cammie Barbash in the unsold Fox pilot Pins and Needles. Britton was one of two finalists for the part of Dorothy Boyd opposite Tom Cruise in Cameron Crowe's romantic comedy-drama Jerry Maguire (1996), but lost the role to Renée Zellweger. In 1996, she began co-starring as Nikki Faber in the ABC sitcom Spin City opposite Michael J. Fox. Her character was written out of the show when Charlie Sheen replaced Fox. She also appeared in the romantic comedy-drama No Looking Back (1998) and the mystery comedy-drama Looking for Kitty (2004), both directed by Edward Burns. In 2001, she co-starred opposite Chris Eigeman and Jamie Harris in the romantic comedy The Next Big Thing. She later co-starred in the independent films The Life Coach, Special Ed, The Lather Effect and The Last Winter.

After leaving Spin City, Britton had a recurring role as Maggie Kimble Hume in the short-lived CBS crime drama The Fugitive. In 2001, she played Gertrude Temple, Shirley Temple's mother in the ABC television film Child Star: The Shirley Temple Story, based on Temple's 1988 autobiography. In the same year, she starred as Sophie Fitzgerald in the short-lived NBC sitcom The Fighting Fitzgeralds. In 2001, Britton also had a recurring role in the NBC political drama The West Wing in the third season, appearing in the two-part premiere titled "Manchester" and the sixth episode titled "Gone Quiet" as Connie Tate, a member of Bruno Gianelli's team. In 2002, she returned to ABC and starred as Rachel Davis in the short-lived sitcom Lost at Home. In 2006, she had a recurring role in the Fox espionage thriller 24 in the fifth season as Diane Huxley, a landlady and a brief girlfriend of Jack Bauer (Kiefer Sutherland).

=== 2006–2011: Further recognition ===
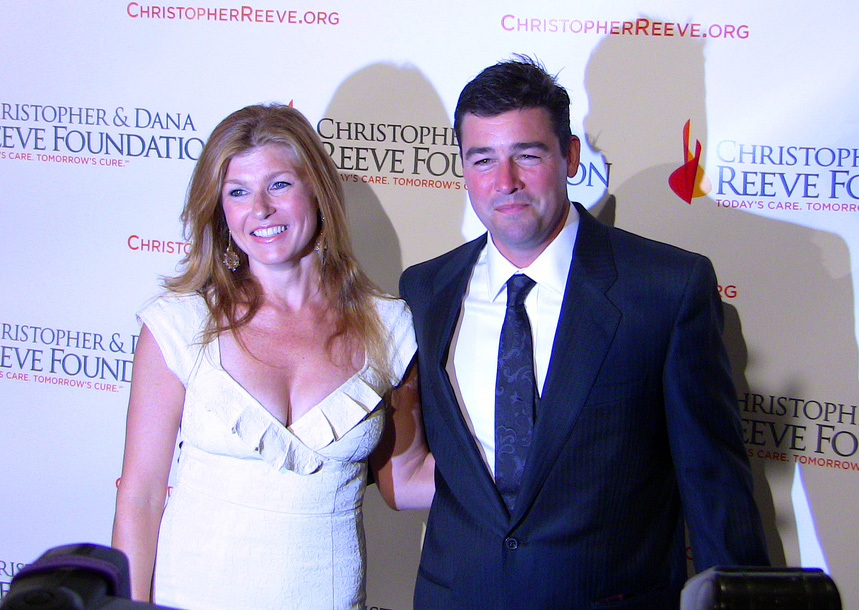
Britton and Kyle Chandler in 2008

Britton co-starred opposite Kyle Chandler in the NBC/DirecTV drama series Friday Night Lights as Tami Taylor, the wife of a head football coach Eric Taylor (Chandler), who becomes a high school guidance counselor. The show ran for five seasons from October 3, 2006, to February 9, 2011. During that time, Britton developed a devoted following for her performance – described by The New York Times as "something of an icon, a 40-something sex symbol and role model." She was first cast opposite Billy Bob Thornton in the film version of the series, Friday Night Lights (2004). For her role in the show, she was nominated for Primetime Emmy Award for Outstanding Lead Actress in a Drama Series in 2010 and 2011, for TCA Award for Individual Achievement in Drama in 2007 and 2008, and was awarded Satellite Award for Best Actress – Television Series Drama in 2010.

In 2009, Britton co-starred opposite Carla Gugino and her Friday Night Lights co-star Adrianne Palicki in the comedy Women in Trouble, and co-starred opposite Jackie Earle Haley, Kyle Gallner and Rooney Mara in the 2010 remake of A Nightmare on Elm Street as Dr. Gwendoline "Gwen" Holbrook. In 2011, she co-starred opposite Pamela Adlon in the romantic comedy Conception. She appeared on the WBEZ radio reading show This American Life's 429th episode, "Will They Know Me at Home?", in which she performed monologues from David Finkel's nonfiction book The Good Soldiers.

In 2011, Britton starred in the first season in the FX horror drama American Horror Story. She played Vivien Harmon, who relocates with her family to California after a series of tragic marital and family issues. Unfortunately for The Harmons, the new house they purchase quickly reveals itself to be haunted. For this role she was nominated for Primetime Emmy Award for Outstanding Lead Actress in a Miniseries or a Movie in 2012. Britton had stated when she wrapped American Horror Story she would be taking a couple of months off to be with her new adopted son, but that she would then begin to re-focus on developing her FX drama collaboration with David O. Russell, but the project went into "development hell".

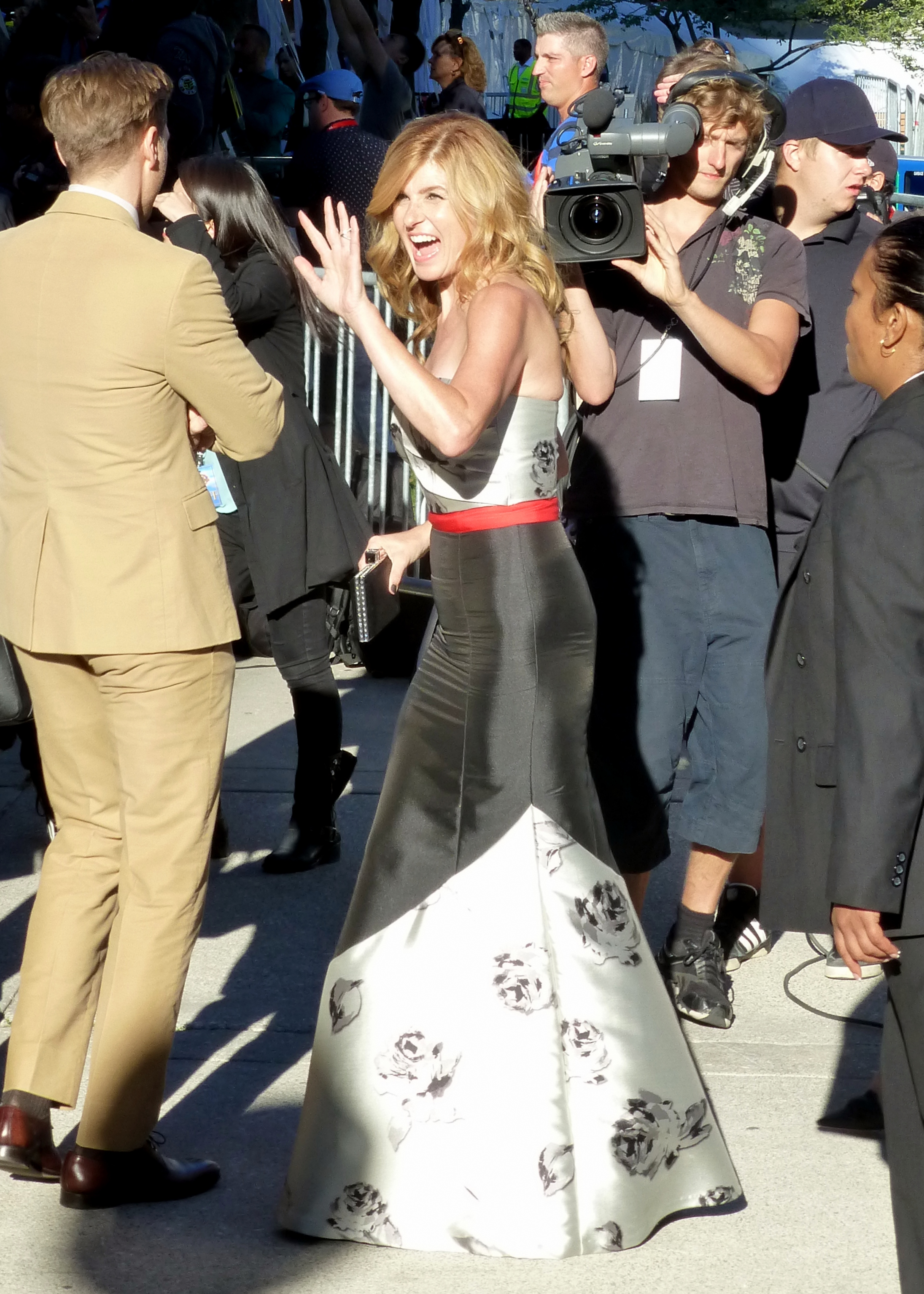
Britton at the premiere of This Is Where I Leave You in September 2014

=== 2012–present: Continued success ===
On March 6, 2012, Britton signed on to star in and produce the ABC/CMT musical drama series, Nashville created by Academy Award winner Callie Khouri. The series ran on ABC and CMT for six seasons from October 10, 2012, to July 26, 2018. She played Rayna Jaymes, a 40-year-old renowned country singer whose stardom is beginning to fade. Britton's performance received critical praise, and she was nominated for a fourth time for a Primetime Emmy Award for Outstanding Lead Actress in a Drama Series and a Golden Globe Award for Best Actress – Television Series Drama for the first time for this role. Britton, for her part, said that the most nerve-wracking part of her role, at least in the beginning, was the singing the role requires of her. The show was cancelled in May 2016 by ABC. However, in June 2016, CMT picked up the series for a fifth season. In February 2017, Britton left Nashville during the fifth season, but returned for the series finale in July 2018 as a guest star.

In 2012, Britton co-starred opposite Edward Burns in the comedy-drama The Fitzgerald Family Christmas. The film was met with positive reviews from critics. That same year, she had co-starred in the comedy-drama Seeking a Friend for the End of the World opposite Steve Carell and Keira Knightley.

In 2013, Britton co-starred opposite Aubrey Plaza in the comedy The To Do List, where she played the mother of Plaza's character. Britton returned to Austin, Texas, where Friday Night Lights was filmed, to co-star opposite Harry Connick Jr. and fellow actors and musicians Willie Nelson, Lyle Lovett and Kris Kristofferson in the Christmas family drama Angels Sing. In 2014, Britton co-starred opposite Adam Driver as a cougar therapist in the comedy-drama This Is Where I Leave You, based on Jonathan Tropper's 2009 best-selling novel.

In 2015, she co-starred opposite Thomas Mann, RJ Cyler and Olivia Cooke in the comedy-drama Me and Earl and the Dying Girl, directed by Alfonso Gomez-Rejon, and based on Jesse Andrews'‍ 2012 novel of the same name, a wry coming-of-age story about Greg (Mann), a teenage oddball forced to befriend Rachel (Cooke), a classmate with leukemia. She played Greg's mother. That same year, she co-starred in the action comedy American Ultra opposite Jesse Eisenberg and Kristen Stewart; Sharon Stone had originally been cast in her part.

In 2016, Britton reunited with American Horror Story creator Ryan Murphy in his miniseries American Crime Story: The People v. O.J. Simpson as Faye Resnick. In 2017, guest starred as Ally in the Showtime comedy series SMILF. Also in 2017, Britton starred in the comedy-drama film Beatriz at Dinner and the biographical drama Professor Marston and the Wonder Women. In 2018, she co-starred in the comedy-drama film The Land of Steady Habits.

Also in 2018, Britton starred as emergency dispatcher Abby Clark in the first season of the Fox procedural drama 9-1-1, her third collaboration with Ryan Murphy. The same year, she returned to American Horror Story for the eighth season, Apocalypse, reprising her role as Vivien Harmon. She also co-starred opposite Eric Bana as Debra Newell in the Bravo true crime anthology series Dirty John, for which she received a Golden Globe Award nomination for Best Actress – Miniseries or Television Film. In 2019, she played Roger Ailes' wife in the drama film, Bombshell. Her later film credits include Promising Young Woman (2020), Joe Bell (2020), Breaking (2022), and Luckiest Girl Alive (2022).

Britton starred as Nicole Mossbacher in the first season of HBO anthology series, The White Lotus in 2021, receiving Primetime Emmy Award for Outstanding Supporting Actress in a Limited or Anthology Series or Movie nomination (losing to her co-star Jennifer Coolidge). In 2023, she reunited with Friday Night Lights showrunner Jason Katims in the Apple TV+ drama series Dear Edward based on the novel of the same name by Ann Napolitano. In 2024, Britton appeared in the dark comedy film Winner playing the role of Reality Winner's mother.

== Personal life ==
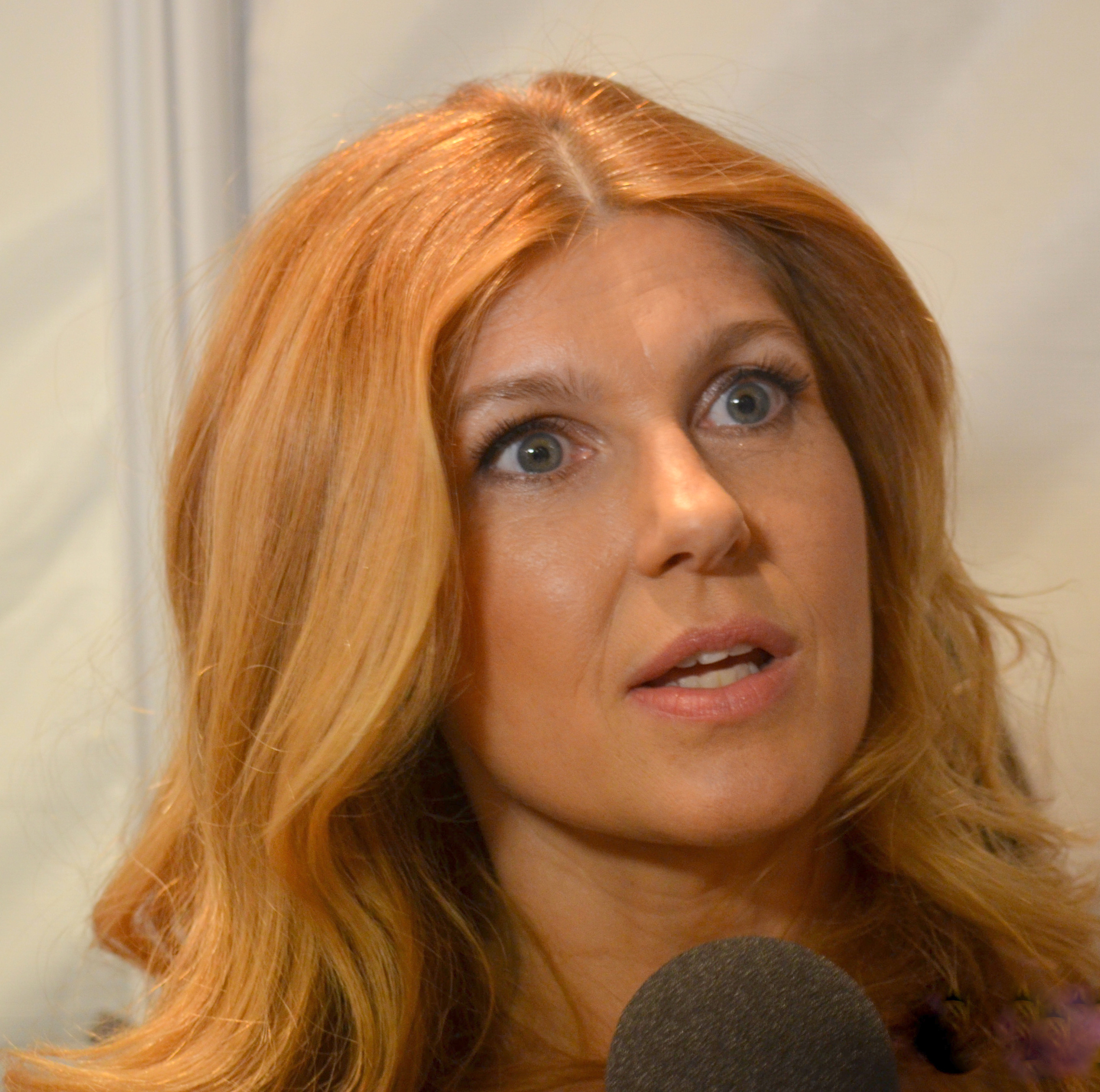
Britton in 2012

Britton met investment banker John Britton at Alpha Delta House at Dartmouth College. They moved to New York together in 1989, married on October 5, 1991, and divorced in 1995.

While at Dartmouth in the late 1980s, Britton studied Chinese and lived for a summer in Beijing with future US Senator Kirsten Gillibrand. In a 2012 interview on NPR, Britton said of the experience: "I always wanted to be an actor. But when I went to college, I had to fulfill a language requirement and so I thought it would be really cool to do it speaking Chinese. My Chinese these days is real, real shaky. Let's put it this way: these days, my singing is better than my Chinese."

In November 2011, Britton adopted a son from Ethiopia. Britton moved to Nashville, Tennessee, in 2012 when she signed to star in the ABC/CMT musical drama Nashville. In January 2023, Britton confirmed an ongoing three-year relationship with television producer David Windsor.

=== Politics ===
Britton is a supporter of the Democratic Party. She publicly supported Hillary Clinton in the 2016 United States presidential election and opposed the candidacy of Donald Trump. Britton endorsed U.S. Senator Kirsten Gillibrand, her college roommate at Dartmouth, in the 2020 Democratic Party presidential primaries and appeared with her at campaign events. She also backed Alabama Democrat Doug Jones for the U.S. Senate in 2017.

On April 2, 2014, Britton became the 10th Goodwill Ambassador of the United Nations Development Programme, the anti-poverty agency of the UN. She joins celebrities such as Antonio Banderas, Maria Sharapova, Zinedine Zidane and Ronaldo in the role of UNDP Goodwill Ambassador. She focuses her advocacy efforts on eradicating extreme poverty, fighting exclusion and empowering women. In June 2016, the Human Rights Campaign released a video in tribute to the victims of the Orlando nightclub shooting; in the video, Britton and others told the stories of the people killed there.

== Filmography ==
=== Film ===
| Year | Title | Role | Notes | Ref. |
|---|---|---|---|---|
| 1995 | The Brothers McMullen | Molly McMullen | | |
| 1998 | No Looking Back | Kelly | | |
| 2001 | One Eyed King | Helen Reilly | | |
| 2001 | The Next Big Thing | Kate Crowley | | |
| 2004 | Looking for Kitty | Marcie Petracelli | | |
| 2004 | Friday Night Lights | Sharon Gaines | | |
| 2005 | Special Ed | Abby | | |
| 2005 | The Life Coach | Connie | | |
| 2006 | The Lather Effect | Valinda | | |
| 2006 | The Last Winter | Abby Sellers | | |
| 2009 | Women in Trouble | Doris Hunter | | |
| 2010 | A Nightmare on Elm Street | Dr. Gwendoline Holbrook | | |
| 2011 | Conception | Gloria | | |
| 2012 | Wing It Parenthood | Sharon Shoshonnesy | Short film | |
| 2012 | Seeking a Friend for the End of the World | Diane | | |
| 2012 | The Fitzgerald Family Christmas | Nora Fitzgerald | | |
| 2013 | Angels Sing | Susan Walker | | |
| 2013 | The To Do List | Jean Klark | | |
| 2014 | This Is Where I Leave You | Tracy Sullivan | | |
| 2015 | Me and Earl and the Dying Girl | Marla Gaines | | |
| 2015 | American Ultra | Victoria Lasseter | | |
| 2017 | Beatriz at Dinner | Kathy | | |
| 2017 | Professor Marston and The Wonder Women | Josette Frank | | |
| 2018 | The Land of Steady Habits | Barbara | | |
| 2019 | The Mustang | Psychologist | | |
| 2019 | Bombshell | Beth Ailes | | |
| 2020 | Promising Young Woman | Dean Elizabeth Walker | | |
| 2020 | Joe Bell | Lola Bell | | |
| 2022 | Breaking | Lisa Larson | | |
| 2022 | Luckiest Girl Alive | Dina Fanelli | | |
| 2024 | Winner | Billie Winner | | |
| 2024 | Here After | Claire Hiller | | |
| 2025 | The Life List | Elizabeth Rose | | |
| 2025 | The Family McMullen | Molly McMullen | | |

=== Television ===
| Year | Title | Role | Notes | Ref. |
|---|---|---|---|---|
| 1995–1996 | Ellen | Heather Clarke | Recurring role; 3 episodes (season 3) | |
| 1995 | Pins and Needles | Cammie Barbash | Unsold television pilot | |
| 1996 | Escape Clause | Leslie Bullard | Television film | |
| 1996–2000 | Spin City | Nikki Faber | Main role; 100 episodes (seasons 1-5) | |
| 1998 | Cupid | Madeleine | Episode: "Pilot" | |
| 2000–2001 | The Fugitive | Maggie Kimble Hume | Recurring role; 4 episodes | |
| 2001 | The Fighting Fitzgeralds | Sophie Fitzgerald | Main role; 10 episodes | |
| 2001 | The West Wing | Connie Tate | Recurring role; 4 episodes (season 3) | |
| 2001 | Child Star: The Shirley Temple Story | Gertrude Temple | Television film | |
| 2003 | Lost at Home | Rachel Davis | Main role; 6 episodes | |
| 2005 | Life as We Know It | Dianne | Episode: "Papa Wheelie" | |
| 2006 | 24 | Diane Huxley | Recurring role; 6 episodes (season 5) | |
| 2006–2011 | Friday Night Lights | Tami Taylor | Main role; 76 episodes | |
| 2011 | American Horror Story: Murder House | Vivien Harmon | Main role; 12 episodes | |
| 2012–2018 | Nashville | Rayna Jaymes / Herself (cameo) | Main role (seasons 1-5), Guest Star (season 6); 97 episodes | |
| 2013 | Drunk History | Patricia Shaheen | Episode: "Boston" | |
| 2014 | Family Guy | Herself (voice) | Episodes: "Baking Bad" and "Brian the Closer" | |
| 2016 | The People v. O. J. Simpson: American Crime Story | Faye Resnick | Episodes: "From the Ashes of Tragedy" & "100% Not Guilty" | |
| 2017 | American Dad! | Herself (voice) | Episode: "Whole Slotta Love" | |
| 2017–2019 | SMILF | Ally | Recurring role; 8 episodes | |
| 2018, 2020 | 9-1-1 | Abigail “Abby” Clark | Main role (season 1), Special guest star (season 3); 12 episodes | |
| 2018 | American Horror Story: Apocalypse | Vivien Harmon | Episode: "Return to Murder House" | |
| 2018 | Dirty John | Debra Newell | Main role; 8 episodes (also executive producer) | |
| 2020 | Make It Work! | Herself | Television special | |
| 2021 | The White Lotus | Nicole Mossbacher | Main role; 6 episodes (season 1) | |
| 2022 | Mamas | Narrator | Docuseries; also executive producer | |
| 2023 | Dear Edward | Dee Dee | Main role; 10 episodes | |
| 2024 | RuPaul's Drag Race All Stars | Herself (guest judge) | Episode: "Grand Finale Variety Extravaganza: Part 2" | |
| 2025 | Zero Day | Valerie Whitesell | Miniseries; 5 episodes | |
| 2025 | Overcompensating | Kathryn | Episodes: "Lucky" & "Welcome to the Black Parade" | |
| 2026 | Rooster | Elizabeth Stoddard | Recurring role; 3 episodes | |
| 2026 | Phony | Ellen Cooke | Main role; 8 episodes (also executive producer) | |

== Discography ==
=== Albums ===
| Title | Album details | Peak chart positions | | | |
| Title | Album details | UK Compilations | US | US Country | US Soundtracks |
|---|---|---|---|---|---|
| The Music of Nashville: Season 1 Volume 1 | Released: December 11, 2012 (USA); Released: February 25, 2013 (UK); Label: Big Machine Records; Format: CD, digital download | 5 | 14 | 3 | 1 |
| The Music of Nashville: Season 1 Volume 2 | Released: May 7, 2013 (USA); Released: May 20, 2013 (UK); Label: Big Machine Records; Format: CD, digital download | 9 | 13 | 5 | 2 |
| The Music of Nashville, Season 1: The Complete Collection | Released: September 23, 2013 (UK); Label: Decca/Big Machine Records; Format: CD, digital download | — | — | — | — |
| The Music of Nashville: Season 2, Volume 1 | Released: December 10, 2013 (USA); Released: February 17, 2014 (UK); Label: Big Machine Records; Format: CD, digital download | — | 34 | 7 | 4 |
| The Music of Nashville: Season 2, Volume 2 | Released: May 6, 2014 (USA); Label: Big Machine Records; Format: CD, digital download | — | 13 | 4 | 2 |
| Christmas With Nashville | Released: November 4, 2014 (USA); Label: Big Machine Records; Format: CD, digital download | — | 59 | 8 | 10 |
| The Music of Nashville: Season 3, Volume 1 | Released: December 9, 2014 (USA); Label: Big Machine Records; Format: CD, digital download | — | 75 | 10 | 6 |
| Nashville: On the Record, Volume 2 | Released: March 23, 2015 (USA); Label: Big Machine Records; Format: CD, digital download | — | 31 | 3 | — |
| The Music of Nashville: Season 3, Volume 2 | Released: May 12, 2015 (USA); Released: June 29, 2015 (UK); Label: Big Machine Records; Format: CD, digital download | — | 28 | 3 | 3 |
| The Music of Nashville: Season 4, Volume 1 | Released: December 4, 2015 (USA); Label: Big Machine Records; Format: CD, digital download | — | 170 | 17 | 6 |
| The Music of Nashville: Season 4, Volume 2 | Released: May 13, 2016; Label: Big Machine Records; Format: CD, digital download | — | 165 | 12 | 3 |
| The Music of Nashville: Season 5, Volume 1 | Released: March 10, 2017 (USA); Label: Big Machine Records; Format: CD, digital download | — | 65 | 12 | 8 |
| The Music of Nashville: Season 5, Volume 2 | Released: June 1, 2017 (USA); Label: Big Machine Records; Format: CD, digital download | | | | |
| The Music of Nashville: Season 6, Volume 2 | Released: July 26, 2018; Label: Big Machine Records; Format: CD, digital download | | | | |

=== Singles ===
| Year | Single | Peak chart positions | | Album |
| Year | Single | US Country | US | Album |
|---|---|---|---|---|
| 2012 | "No One Will Ever Love You" (with Charles Esten)^{A} | 36 | 117 | The Music of Nashville: Season 1 Volume 1 |
| 2012 | "Wrong Song" (with Hayden Panettiere) | 39 | — | The Music of Nashville: Season 1 Volume 1 |
| 2013 | "Stronger Than Me" | 42 | — | The Music of Nashville: Season 1 Volume 2 |
| 2013 | "The Best Songs Come from Broken Hearts" | 48 | — | —N/a |
| 2014 | "He Ain't Gonna Change" (with Hayden Panettiere) | 50 | — | —N/a |
"—" denotes releases that did not chart

- ^{A}Did not enter the Hot 100 but charted on Bubbling Under Hot 100 Singles.

== Awards and nominations ==
| Year | Award | Category | Work | Result | Ref. |
|---|---|---|---|---|---|
| 2007 | Television Critics Association Awards | Individual Achievement in a Drama Series | Friday Night Lights | Nominated | |
| 2007 | Gotham Awards 2007 | Best Ensemble Cast | The Last Winter | Nominated | |
| 2008 | Television Critics Association Awards | Individual Achievement in a Drama Series | Friday Night Lights | Nominated | |
| 2010 | Satellite Awards 2010 | Best Actress – Television Series Drama | Friday Night Lights | Won | |
| 2010 | Online Film & Television Association Award | Best Actress in a Drama Series | Friday Night Lights | Nominated | |
| 2010 | 62nd Primetime Emmy Awards | Outstanding Lead Actress in a Drama Series | Friday Night Lights | Nominated | |
| 2011 | Satellite Awards 2011 | Best Actress – Television Series Drama | Friday Night Lights | Nominated | |
| 2011 | 1st Critics' Choice Television Awards | Best Drama Actress | Friday Night Lights | Nominated | |
| 2011 | Online Film & Television Association Award | Best Actress in a Drama Series | Friday Night Lights | Nominated | |
| 2011 | IGN Summer Movie Awards | Best TV Actress | Friday Night Lights | Nominated | |
| 2011 | 63rd Primetime Emmy Awards | Outstanding Lead Actress in a Drama Series | Friday Night Lights | Nominated | |
| 2011 | Texas Film Hall of Fame | Star of Hall of Fame | Herself | Won | |
| 2012 | 64th Primetime Emmy Awards | Outstanding Lead Actress in a Miniseries or a Movie | American Horror Story | Nominated | |
| 2012 | Satellite Awards 2012 | Best Actress – Television Series Drama | Nashville | Nominated | |
| 2012 | Satellite Awards 2012 | Best Television Series – Drama | Nashville (as producer) | Nominated | |
| 2013 | 70th Golden Globe Awards | Best Actress – Television Series Drama | Nashville | Nominated | |
| 2013 | TV Guide Award | Favorite Actress | Nashville | Nominated | |
| 2013 | 65th Primetime Emmy Awards | Outstanding Lead Actress in a Drama Series | Nashville | Nominated | |
| 2013 | New York Women in Film & Television Award | Muse Award | Herself | Won | |
| 2018 | 76th Golden Globe Awards | Best Actress – Miniseries or Television Film | Dirty John | Nominated | |
| 2018 | Critics' Choice Television Award | Best Actress in a Movie/Miniseries | Dirty John | Nominated | |
| 2022 | Hollywood Critics Association TV Awards | Best Supporting Actress in a Broadcast Network or Cable Limited or Anthology Series | The White Lotus | Nominated | |
| 2022 | 74th Primetime Emmy Awards | Outstanding Supporting Actress in a Limited or Anthology Series or Movie | The White Lotus | Nominated | |
| 2023 | 2nd Children's and Family Emmy Awards | Outstanding Non-Fiction Program | Mamas | Nominated | |
| 2026 | 53rd Daytime Creative Arts & Lifestyle Emmy Awards | Outstanding Lifestyle Program | The Motherhood | Pending | |
