= Richard Lee Jackson =

American actor and musician (born 1979)

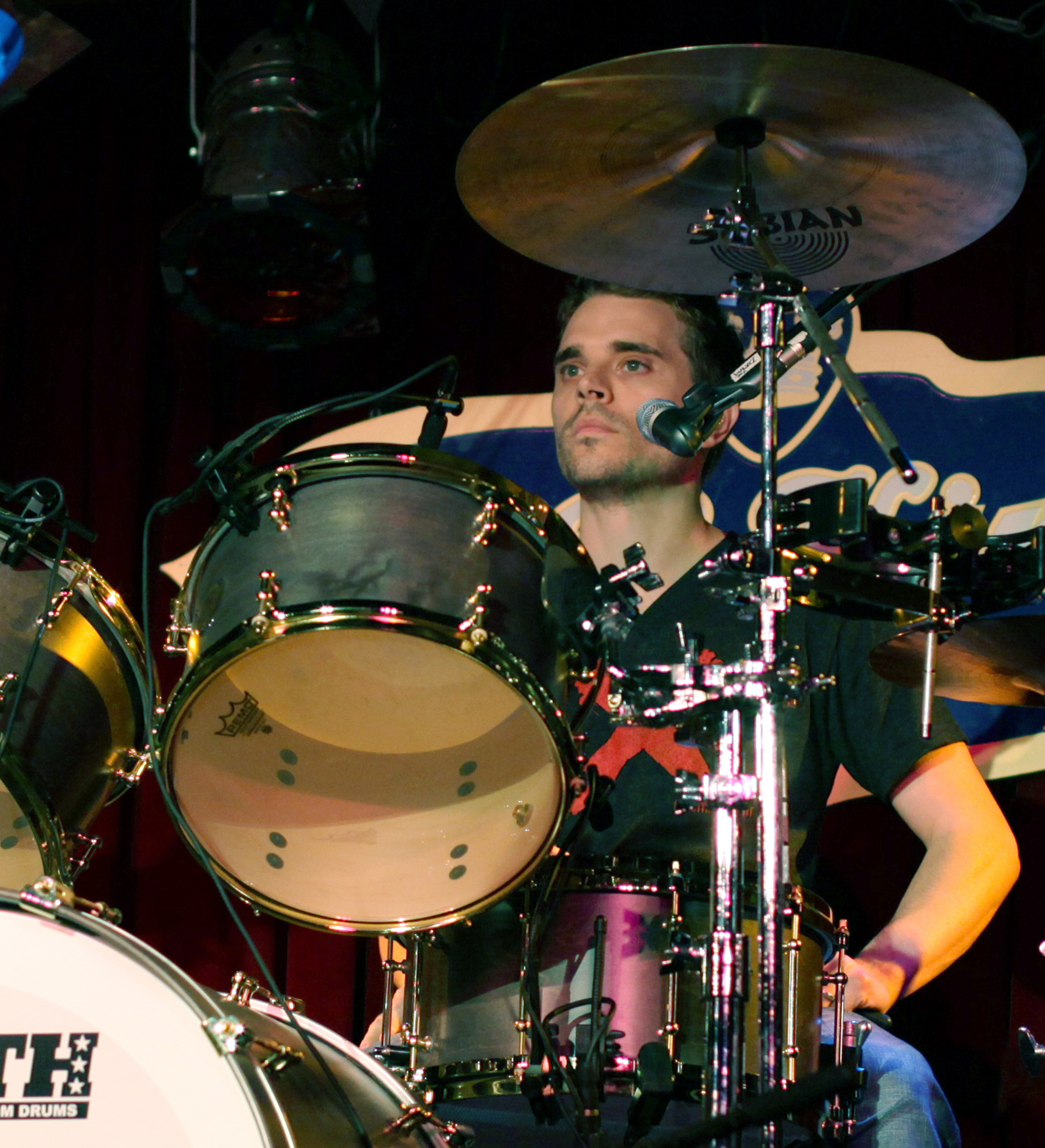
- Jackson playing drums with Enation in 2013.
- Born: May 29, 1979 (age 47); Redlands, California, U.S.
- Occupations: Drummer; actor
- Years active: 1993–present
- Relatives: Jonathan Jackson (brother); Candice Jackson (sister)
- Musical career
- Genre: Indie rock
- Instrument: Drums

Richard Lee Jackson (born May 29, 1979) is an American drummer and actor. Since 2004, he plays drums in American band Enation, of which his brother, Jonathan Jackson, is the lead singer.

== Early life ==
Jackson was born in Redlands, California, the son of an amateur ventriloquist and businesswoman, and a family physician, country musician and Congressional candidate in the state of Washington. In 1993, he played Jason Lee Scott's cousin Jeremy on the Mighty Morphin Power Rangers episode "The Rockstar". He also starred as Ryan Parker in Saved by the Bell: The New Class and in Bring it On Again as Derrek the Deejay.
