= Claire Guerreso =

American singer-songwriter

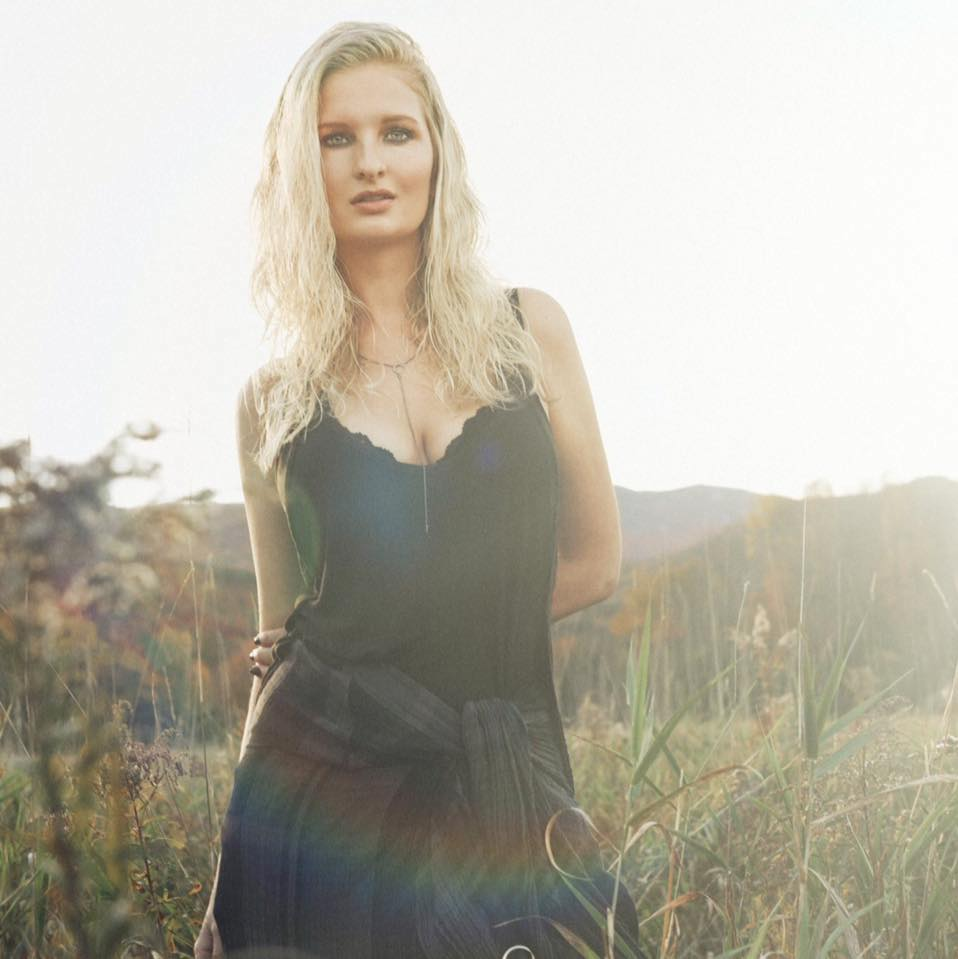

Background information
- Born: Emily Claire Guerreso; September 19, 1983 (age 43)
- Origin: United States
- Genres: Pop, indie rock, EDM, house, Alternative, Folk
- Occupations: Singer, songwriter, multi-instrumentalist
- Years active: 2003–present
- Website: www.claireguerreso.com

Claire Guerreso is an American singer, songwriter and multi-instrumentalist from Boulder, Colorado, United States, who is best known for her music featured on TV, film, ads, and promos as well as her work with various artists.

== Career ==
In 2008, Guerreso formed a group called The Little Bear and released numerous albums through Infinity Cat Recordings.

In 2013, she started releasing music under her own name again including songs featured on such shows and brands as ABC television show Station 19, CBS‘s Nancy Drew, The CW's Reign, ABC television Grey's Anatomy, Hart of Dixie, VH1's television series Black Ink Crew, VH1's reality television series Mob Wives, ABC's crime drama Rookie Blue, ABC family's Pretty Little Liars, NBC's Shades of Blue, E! Entertainment Television series The Royals, NBC's Heartbeat, Fox's legal drama Proven Innocent, All American, Ford, and Boohoo clothing.

In 2015, Guerreso's song, "Good Night", was recorded by Universal Recording Artist, Billy Currington. The song is featured on Billy's album Summer Forever. Another one of Guerreso's songs, "Save Yourself", which had her on lead vocals under the name Claire de Lune, was featured in the official trailer for the critically acclaimed movie, Mad Max: Fury Road. Guerreso's song and vocals on "Skipping Stones" created a buzz online after being featured on ABC family's Pretty Little Liars (season 6). The song reached No. 18 on iTunes Alternative Song Chart, No. 5 on Shazam's Future Hits Chart, was the No. 11 Trending song on Shazam, and reached over a million views across Youtube in a short time.

In 2016, Guerreso released her single "Skipping Stones" on Ultra Records, which was then remixed by Dutch duo Deepend ("I'm Just A Skipping Stone") and Dutch producer Lulleaux. The song has gained major blog buzz and airplay overseas, appearing on Tiësto's Club Life (Tiësto's weekly radio show) and other DJ stations overseas. In 2017, Guerreso released an EP through Ultra Records titled Heavy, which featured "Skipping Stones". Also in 2017, another single from the EP, "I Cannot Be Broken," was used in Season 11 of the Canadian drama series Heartland.

She has also had multiple songs on ABC's Nashville, including "Follow Your Heart" (season 3), "Beyond The Sun" (season 4), "Only Tennessee" (season 4), "Count On Me" (season 4), "Wild Card" (season 4), and "Your Best" (Season 5).

In 2018, Guerreso released "Ashes" which was featured on the Fox television series, Lucifer (season 3). She also released "Rise" which was featured on The CW's Dynasty (season 1), while "Until I Get Mine" was featured on ABC family's For The People (season 1).

In 2020, Guerreso released her new EP Face To Face, co-written and produced by Daniel Tashian. Mixed and mastered by Reel Recording, it featured "Runaway", "Corner Of Your Heart", "Face To Face", and "You Only Live Once". Guerreso followed it up with five new singles: "This Is Love", "This Is the New Wave", "How It Goes", "I See Beautiful" and "Wake Up" co-written with Luke Arens.

Also in 2020, she released her single "We Were Born for This", which was featured on The Walking Dead: World Beyond trailer for the first season during Comic-Con.

In 2021, Guerreso released "No Turning Back" (for NBC’s The Blacklist), “In Our Blood" (for ESPN’s SEC College Softball Promo), and "Broken" (for The CW's The American), respectfully. She also released her brand new single, "Savage".

Most recently, Guerreso released "Feel So Good" which was featured on Netflix’s Atypical, You Say You Want A Revolution (season 4). She also released two new EP’s titled New Day and It’s Time, both featuring four previously released songs and one new song. The EP is followed by two new singles, One of a Kind and CEO.

== Discography ==
=== EPs ===
- 2008: As Is
- 2017: Heavy
- 2020: Face to Face
- 2021: New Day
- 2021: It’s Time

=== The Little Bear ===
- 2010: The Little Bear (EP)
- 2011: Bridges (EP)
- 2011: Oliver (Single)
- 2012: The Little Bear
- 2012: Grow (Single)
- 2012: Hello (Single)
- 2013: Heaven (EP)

=== Singles ===
- 2013: "Hide and Seek"
- 2014: "Tainted Love"
- 2014: "Splitting Wood"
- 2015: "Butterfly"
- 2015: "Tiger Eyes"
- 2015: "Burning Like Fire"
- 2015: "Drifting Away"
- 2015: "Skipping Stones"
- 2015: "Listen"
- 2016: "Placekeeper"
- 2017: "I Cannot Be Broken"
- 2017: "Battle Cry"
- 2017: "Looking Back"
- 2018: "Ashes"
- 2018: "Rise"
- 2018: "Until I Get Mine"
- 2018: "Give It to Me"
- 2018: "No Doubt"
- 2018: "Chains"
- 2018: "Body Is Moving"
- 2018: "Hero"
- 2019: "Not Goin' Away"
- 2019: "Runaway"
- 2020: "This Moment"
- 2020: "This Is Love"
- 2020: "This Is the New Wave"
- 2020: "How It Goes"
- 2020: "I See Beautiful"
- 2020: "Wake Up"
- 2020: "We Were Born for This"
- 2020: "Grand Old Flag" (Oshins feat. Claire Guerreso)
- 2021: "Savage"
- 2021: "No Turning Back"
- 2021: "In Our Blood"
- 2021: "Broken"
- 2021: "Feel So Good"
- 2022: "One of a Kind"
- 2022: "CEO"
- 2022: "By Your Side"
- 2023: "The Let Down"
- 2023: "Without You"
- 2023: "In The Blink Of An Eye"
- 2023: "Where Do We Go from Here"
- 2023: "Troublemaker"
- 2024: "Show Ya How"
- 2024: "Watch Me"
- 2024: "Closing In" (with Klergy)
- 2024: "Ready When You Are" (with JF)
- 2025: "Buttons"
- 2025: "Cross My Heart"
- 2025: "We're Back"
- 2025: "I Won't Give Up"
- 2026: "Here For It"
- 2026: "Go Go Go"
- 2026: "Pass It On"
- 2026: "Float"

=== Other songs ===
- 2014: "Highs and Lows"
- 2015: "Save Yourself" (As heard in the trailer for Mad Max: Fury Road)
- 2015: "Free" (Provided background vocals for Jill Andrews)
- 2016: "This Too"
- 2017: "Closer"
- 2017: "Now I See"
- 2021: "Upgrade"
- 2023: "Miss You More" (with Kevin Griffin)
- 2023: "Great Great Day" (with Kevin Griffin)
- 2023: "Like What You See"

=== Songwriting credits ===
- 2015: "Follow Your Heart" (Co-written with Jill Andrews for Nashville)
- 2015: "Beyond The Sun" (Co-written with Aaron Espe for Nashville)
- 2015: "Count on Me" (Co-written with Viktor Krauss for Nashville)
- 2015: "Good Night" (Co-written with Daniel Tashian and Rosi Golan for Billy Currington)
- 2016: "Only Tennessee" (Co-written with Daniel Tashian for Nashville)
- 2016: "Wild Card" (Co-written with Rosi Golan and Daniel Tashian for Nashville)
- 2017: "Your Best" (Written for Nashville)
