= Enation (band) =

American indie rock band

Background information
- Origin: Battle Ground, Washington, U.S.
- Genres: Indie rock; alternative rock
- Years active: 2004–present
- Labels: Hilasterion Records; Loud & Proud
- Members: Jonathan Jackson; Richard Lee Jackson; Jonathan Thatcher
- Past members: Daniel Sweatt (2004-2017); Michael Galeotti (2004-2012); Luke Galeotti (2008-2012); Amber Sweeney (2004-2005)
- Website: www.jonathanjackson.com

Enation is an American indie rock band formed in Battle Ground, Washington in 2004. The band currently resides in Nashville, TN.

== History ==
Brothers and actors Jonathan Jackson and Richard Lee Jackson originally formed the music group that came to be known as Enation in 2003.

In 2017, Jonathan and Richard invited their friend Jonathan Thatcher (formerly of Delirious?) to tour with them.

Jonathan, the band's frontman, sings, plays guitar, piano, and writes most of the songs. Richard plays drums and percussion and sings backup vocals, with Jonathan Thatcher on bass and bass synth.

Enation have landed on the Billboard Top 10 ("Live From Nashville" DVD, #9) and have garnered numerous radio and TV appearances including live performances on The View and VH1’s Big Morning Buzz Live.

Enation was originally formed in 2003 with bassist Daniel Sweatt, who exited the band in 2017, wanting to spend more time with his family. "Ride," Enation's first single from their 2004 debut independent album, Identity Theft, was featured as the theme song to Riding the Bullet, a Stephen King thriller which also stars Jonathan Jackson. The band later released more independent albums between 2007 and 2011: Soul & Story: Volume One, Where the Fire Starts, World In Flight, and My Ancient Rebellion, among other live albums and specialty EP's.

Bethany Joy Lenz, who played Haley James Scott on the CW television drama One Tree Hill, recorded Enation's song "Feel This" for use in the fifth-season finale of the series. At the time, Lenz was married to band member Michael Galeotti, a relationship she described as abusive. After the episode aired the song became a top 10 song on iTunes rock charts. The band also made a cameo appearance on the show, playing Feel This and the title track from their 2008 album World In Flight.

In 2017 ENATION released their full length alternative rock album "Anthems For The Apocalypse" produced by Greg Archilla, who is known for his work with Matchbox Twenty and Collective Soul through Hilasterion Records, distributed by MRI / RED Distribution.

== Discography ==
| Year | Title | Record label |
|---|---|---|
| 2004 | Identity Theft | Hilasterion Records |
| 2007 | Where the Fire Starts | Hilasterion Records |
| 2007 | Soul & Story: Volume One | Hilasterion Records |
| 2008 | Falling Into Sounds: The Early Sessions 2004-2007 | Hilasterion Records |
| 2008 | World In Flight | Hilasterion Records |
| 2009 | The Madness of Love: World in Flight Bonus EP | Hilasterion Records |
| 2009 | The Future is a Memory: Live | Hilasterion Records |
| 2011 | My Ancient Rebellion | Hilasterion Records |
| 2014 | Radio Cinematic | Loud & Proud Records |
| 2016 | Live From Nashville (DVD) | Hilasterion Records |
| 2017 | Anthems For The Apacolypse | Hilasterion Records |
