= The Music of Nashville: Season 3, Volume 1 =

Soundtrack album by Various artists
- Released: December 9, 2014
- Genre: Country, Country pop, Country rock
- Length: 35:07
- Label: Big Machine Records

The Music of Nashville chronology
Christmas with Nashville (2014)	The Music of Nashville: Season 3, Volume 1 (2014)	The Music of Nashville: Season 3, Volume 2 (2015)

The Music of Nashville: Season 3, Volume 1 is the fifth soundtrack album for the American musical drama television series Nashville, created by Academy Award winner Callie Khouri and starring Connie Britton as country music superstar Rayna Jaymes and Hayden Panettiere as new star Juliette Barnes. The album was released digitally and (exclusive to Target stores in North America) physically on December 9, 2014 through Big Machine Records.

== Track listing ==
Standard edition
No.	Title	Writer(s)	Performer(s)	Length
1.	"If It's Love"	Justin Davis, Sarah Zimmermann, Aaron Eshuis	Chris Carmack	3:41
2.	"Lies of the Lonely"	Natalie Hemby, Shane McAnally, Josh Osborne	Connie Britton	4:10
3.	"Disappear"	Jaida Dreyer, Andrew Rollins, Cory Mayo, Steve Pasch	Hayden Panettiere	3:45
4.	"Carry On"	Sarah Siskind, Julie Lee	Clare Bowen and Mykelti Williamson	3:22
5.	"Gasoline and Matches"	Buddy Miller, Julie Miller	Connie Britton and Laura Benanti	2:51
6.	"I Know How To Love You Now"	Charles Esten, Deana Carter	Charles Esten	4:01
7.	"If Your Heart Can Handle It"	Dean Alexander, Dreyer	Chris Carmack and Aubrey Peeples	3:32
8.	"The Most Beautiful Girl In the World"	David Poe	Jonathan Jackson, Sam Palladio and Chaley Rose	3:27
9.	"Good Woman - Good To Me"	Rodney Crowell	Will Chase	2:53
10.	"When You Open Your Eyes"	Nicole Johnson, Michael Logen, Sarah Emily Parrish	Clare Bowen and Sam Palladio	3:43

== Commercial reception ==
The album debuted on the Billboard 200 at No. 75 with 11,000 copies sold in the US. The album has sold 40,500 copies in the US as of May 2015.

== Charts ==
=== Weekly charts ===
Chart (2014–15)	Peak position
US Billboard 200	75
US Top Country Albums (Billboard)	10
US Soundtrack Albums (Billboard)	6

=== Year-end charts ===
Chart (2015)	Position
US Top Country Albums (Billboard)	66
