= Brad Krevoy =

Film producer

- Born: United States
- Education: Stanford University; Hastings College of the Law
- Occupations: Film producer, entrepreneur
- Years active: 1986–present
- Spouse: Susie (m. 1996)
- Children: 3

Brad Krevoy is a film producer, entrepreneur, and founder and chairman/CEO of the Motion Picture Corporation of America. Over his 37-year career, Krevoy has been involved in the production and distribution of more than 250 film and television projects, most notably Dumb and Dumber, and Christmas-themed entertainment, including the A Christmas Prince and The Princess Switch trilogies, as well as Falling for Christmas and Irish Wish.

== Early life and education ==
Krevoy graduated from Beverly Hills High School. He went on to study at Stanford University, graduating in 1978 with a BA in Political Science. He then went on to study at UC Hastings, College of the Law. After graduation, he served as a Legislative Fellow in the California State Legislature and worked as an entertainment attorney at a prominent Los Angeles law firm.

== Early career and work with Roger Corman (1983–1986) ==
Krevoy's major entry into the film industry came from a chance encounter with Roger Corman at a Stanford football game in 1983. Krevoy worked for Corman's Concorde-New Horizon pictures, handling the business affairs; Concorde quickly becoming one of the largest suppliers of VHS tapes, having deals in place with every major distributor in the world.

== MPCA (1986–1996) ==
In 1986, Krevoy and his longtime business partner Steve Stabler co-founded Motion Picture Corporation of America (MPCA) to focus on producing, acquiring, and distributing commercial film and television productions.

During the company's formative years, they produced cult favorites including The Purple People Eater (1988) with Ned Beatty; Back to Back (1989), starring Bill Paxton and Apollonia; and the sex comedy Miracle Beach (1992).

=== Dumb and Dumber ===
Krevoy and Stabler released the blockbuster comedy Dumb and Dumber in 1994. The script had been around for nearly seven years and had been rejected by every major studio; MPCA's support let the writers, Bobby and Peter Farrelly, direct their own film and attach Jim Carrey to star.

Dumb and Dumber broke box office comedy records, opening and remaining at number one on the U.S. box office for four straight weeks over the holiday season. The film went on to gross $127 million domestically and $120 million overseas for a worldwide total of $247 million off of a $16 million budget.

Krevoy and MPCA went on to produce more big-budget studio comedies, including Beverly Hills Ninja starring Chris Farley and Jungle 2 Jungle with Tim Allen. They also produced Threesome, starring Lara Flynn Boyle and Stephen Baldwin. The film was one of the most successful independent arthouse films of the year, grossing just under $15 million domestically.

=== First-look deals ===
Starting in November 1995, until they were acquired by Metromedia International Group in 1996, Krevoy and MPCA had a first-look producing deal with Paramount Studios. Krevoy and MPCA also signed a first-look deal with Sony Pictures in the late 90s, where they produced more than 10 movies.

== Co-president of Orion Pictures (1996–1998) ==
In 1996, MPCA was purchased by John Kluge's Metromedia International Group. Metromedia had just purchased the independent production company Orion Pictures from chapter 11 bankruptcy. When MPCA was merged into the company, Krevoy and Stabler took over as the Co-President's of Orion Pictures and were given a six-picture deal.

At Orion, Krevoy oversaw the production, acquisition, and distribution of Orion's motion picture and television programming. He produced films for Academy Award-winner Tom Schulman (Dead Poets Society) and released films such as 1997's Academy Award and Golden Globe nominee for Best Foreign Language Film, Prisoner of the Mountains (directed by Sergei Bodrov), and the acclaimed Ulee's Gold (directed by Victor Nunez and presented by Jonathan Demme). Ulee's Gold was a critical hit and won its leading actor, Peter Fonda, his first and only Golden Globe for best actor. Fonda also received his first and only Oscar nomination for best actor.

After two years of revitalizing Orion Pictures, Metromedia went on to sell Orion to MGM. Krevoy was able to take the MPCA name back as part of his original deal.

== Restarting MPCA (1998–2014) ==
In 1998, Krevoy returned to his independent filmmaking roots and restarted MPCA with a distribution deal through MGM.

Since rebooting MPCA, Krevoy has produced a wide array of motion pictures including: boxing drama Joe and Max (which collected both ESPN and ACE award nominations); the 2002 Sundance premiere Bookies; and Boat Trip for Artisan/Lionsgate.

In 2004 Krevoy produced the drama, A Love Song for Bobby Long, starring John Travolta and Scarlett Johansson. The film was well received by audiences and critics, earning Scarlett Johansson a Golden Globe nomination.

After the credit crunch hit in 2008, Krevoy found new investors and ramped up production. He built a strong international sales team and began assembling an eclectic slate of programming.

Krevoy produced the 2009 war drama Taking Chance, based on the true experiences of Lt. Colonel Michael Strobl, who wrote about his time in the widely circulated article "Taking Chance Home". The film was directed by Ross Katz and starred Kevin Bacon. It was shown at the Sundance Film Festival before premiering on HBO. Taking Chance received a total of 27 award nominations and 6 wins, also winning the Humanitas Prize.

Krevoy and MPCA produced a string of straight-to-DVD action movies. These included Linewatch (2008); Hardwired (2009), which also starred Val Kilmer; Ticking Clock (2011); and One in the Chamber (2012), featuring Dolph Lundgren. They produced two movies with Samuel L. Jackson: Arena (2011); and Meeting Evil (2012). During this time MPCA also made two movies with Jean-Claude Van Damme – Assassination Games (2011); and Six Bullets (2012).

In 2011, Krevoy produced Beverly Hills Chihuahua 2 for Disney, a sequel to the 2008 hit comedy. Most of the original cast returned and the film did well in the home video market with sales of over $30 million.

In 2014, Krevoy and Stabler were executive producers on Dumb and Dumber To, taking place 20 years after the events of the first film. Jeff Daniels and Jim Carrey reprised their roles and the film was released on November 14, 2014. It opened at number one in the U.S. box office, and went on to earn $169 million worldwide.

== Christmas, rom-com and family movies (2013–present) ==
Since 2013, Krevoy and MPCA have produced more than 70 original Christmas, rom-com and family movies for select broadcasters, including Netflix and The Hallmark Channel.

=== With Netflix ===
Krevoy and MPCA's first production for Netflix, A Christmas Prince, starring Rose McIver, Ben Lamb and Alice Krige, was released on November 17, 2017. In 2018, MPCA produced The Princess Switch, starring Vanessa Hudgens and Sam Palladio. Both of these films ended up producing trilogies for Netflix.

MPCA's other recent Netflix holiday movies include Holiday in the Wild, starring Rob Lowe and Kristin Davis; The Knight Before Christmas, starring Vanessa Hudgens and Josh Whitehouse; The Holiday Calendar, starring Kat Graham, Quincy Brown, and Ron Cephas Jones; and Christmas Inheritance, starring Eliza Taylor and Jake Lacy.

MPCA and Netflix also collaborated with Lindsay Lohan on her first lead film role in 9 years, for 2022's Falling for Christmas. After the success of that film, they reteamed on 2024's Irish Wish, MPCA's first non-Christmas Original film with Netflix. They also released Mother of the Bride in 2024, which starred Brooke Shields, Benjamin Bratt, and Miranda Cosgrove and was directed by Mark Waters.

=== With Hallmark ===
Krevoy and MPCA have produced over 30 original movies for Hallmark and Hallmark Movies & Mysteries, including several film franchises. A few of these include all five entries in the popular Murder, She Baked series based on the book series by Joanne Fluke, all three of the Flower Shop Mystery series of films, based on the book series by Kate Collins, four films in the Darrow & Darrow series from writer Phoef Sutton, and three installments of The Crossword Mysteries, which were produced in collaboration with NY Times Crossword editor Will Shortz.

Krevoy is an executive producer of the Hallmark Channel show When Calls the Heart. The series is adapted from the bestselling Canadian West series of books by Janette Oke. The show has been hugely successful in the ratings, including high numbers for the Christmas specials. The show is currently airing its seventh season, making it the longest-running original series on Hallmark. In August 2019, a spin-off show titled When Hope Calls launched with Hallmark's new streaming service, Hallmark Movies Now.

=== With Great American Family and Pure Flix ===
In 2021, Krevoy began a partnership with the newly rebranded network Great American Family, run by former Hallmark Channel CEO Bill Abbott. MPCA producing twelve Christmas films for their first holiday season, starring Cameron Mathison, Maggie Lawson, Chad Michael Murray, Jill Wagner, Jen Lilley, and Becca Tobin. When Hope Calls also premiered a second season, moving over from Hallmark, and bringing with it When Calls the Heart veteran Lori Loughlin.

2022 saw the release of two romantic comedies for GAF, The Winter Palace starring Danica McKellar, and Harmony from the Heart, starring Jessica Lowndes and Jesse Metcalfe. Harmony from the Heart was also produced and written by Lowndes.

=== Other Holiday Films ===
Krevoy and MPCA also began producing Christmas films for CBS and Peacock in 2021. For CBS, they made A Christmas Proposal, starring Adam Rodriguez and Jessica Camacho, as well as Christmas Takes Flight, starring Katie Lowes and Evan Williams. And Peacock got into the Christmas game with The Housewives of the North Pole, starring Real Housewives alum Kyle Richards and Betsy Brandt.

== Other ventures ==
In 1999 Krevoy teamed with exhibition veterans Ron Leslie (Former president of AMC theatres) and Peter Fornstam, as well as real estate attorney Richard Lawrence, to form Resort Theatres of America. By March 1999, the company had acquired all of Metropolitan Theatre Corp.'s Palm screen locations for a total of 85 screens.

In 1999, they purchased and renovated the historic Isis Theatre in Aspen, Co.

== Personal life ==
Brad married his wife Susie in 1996. They live in Santa Monica with their three daughters and two dogs.

== Filmography ==
=== Film ===
==== As a producer ====
Year	Film	Credit	Notes
1987	Sweet Revenge	Executive producer	
1988	Dangerous Love		
1988	Purple People Eater		
1989	Memorial Valley Massacre		
1989	Think Big		
1989	Ministry of Vengeance		
1989	Back to Back		
1991	Hangfire		
1991	Trabbi Goes to Hollywood		
1992	Double Trouble		
1992	Miracle Beach		
1993	Ghost Brigade		
1993	Pumpkinhead II: Blood Wings		Direct-to-video
1993	Love, Cheat & Steal		
1994	Threesome		
1994	Every Breath		
1994	The Desperate Trail		Direct-to-video
1994	Dumb and Dumber		
1995	Coldblooded		
1995	Till the End of the Night		
1995	Cover Me		
1995	Soldier Boyz		
1996	Bio-Dome		
1996	If Lucy Fell		
1996	Kingpin		
1996	The War at Home		
1996	Albino Alligator		
1996	The Glass Cage		
1997	Retroactive		
1997	Beverly Hills Ninja		
1997	Jungle 2 Jungle	Executive producer	
1997	Behind Enemy Lines		
1997	8 Heads in a Duffel Bag		
1997	Midnight Blue		
1997	The Corporate Ladder		
1997	The Locusts		
1997	Gang Related		
1997	Best Men		
1997	True Heart		
1997	The Curse of Inferno		
1998	Tactical Assault		Direct-to-video
1998	Overnight Delivery		Direct-to-video
1998	Music from Another Room		
1998	American Dragons		
1999	The Suburbans		
2000	3 Strikes	Executive producer	
2000	A Rumor of Angels	Executive producer	
2001	The Breed		
2002	Undisputed		
2002	Boat Trip		
2003	Bookies	Executive producer	
2003	National Lampoon's Barely Legal		
2003	Dumb and Dumberer: When Harry Met Lloyd		
2003	Consequence		
2004	Dracula 3000		
2004	A Love Song for Bobby Long	Executive producer	
2004	Riding the Bullet		
2004	Blast		
2005	Slipstream		
2006	Second in Command		Direct-to-video
2006	The Hard Corps		Direct-to-video
2007	Moondance Alexander	Executive producer	
2008	Linewatch		
2009	Hardwired	Executive producer	
2011	Ticking Clock		Direct-to-video
2011	Beverly Hills Chihuahua 2		Direct-to-video
2011	Assassination Games		
2011	Arena		
2012	Meeting Evil		
2012	One in the Chamber		
2012	Six Bullets		
2013	The Package		
2014	Dumb and Dumber To	Executive producer	
2017	A Christmas Prince	Executive producer	
2017	Christmas Inheritance	Executive producer	
2018	The Holiday Calendar	Executive producer	
2018	The Princess Switch	Executive producer	
2018	A Christmas Prince: The Royal Wedding	Executive producer	
2019	Holiday in the Wild		
2019	The Knight Before Christmas		
2019	A Christmas Prince: The Royal Baby	Executive producer	
2020	Operation Christmas Drop		
2020	The Princess Switch: Switched Again		
2021	The Princess Switch: Romancing the Star		
2021	A Castle for Christmas		
2021	Heatwave	Executive Producer	
2022	Margaux		
2022	Falling for Christmas		
2023	Best. Christmas. Ever!		
2024	The Image of You		
2024	Irish Wish		
2024	Mother of the Bride		
TBD	Winter Spring Summer or Fall		
TBD	The Stranger in My Home		

==== As a production manager ====
Year	Film	Role
2012	Six Bullets	Unit production manager
2017	A Christmas Prince	Unit production manager
2018	A Christmas Prince: The Royal Wedding	Unit production manager

==== As an actor ====
Year	Film	Role
1991	Hangfire	Examiner #1
1991	Trabbi Goes to Hollywood	Bystander #2
2002	Boat Trip	Pilot

=== Television ===
==== As a producer ====
Year	Title	Credit	Notes
1992	Sketch Artist		Television film
1992	Ring of the Musketeers		Television film
1995	Sketch Artist II: Hands That See		Television film
1995	Johnny & Clyde		Television film
1998	Breakfast with Einstein		Television film
1998	Route 9		Television film
1999	Absence of the Good		Television film
1999	Annie	Co-producer	Television film
2000	A Family in Crisis: The Elian Gonzales Story	Executive producer	Television film
2002	Joe and Max	Executive producer	Television film
2002	Borderline		Television film
2002	Pavement		Television film
2003	Bugs	Executive producer	Television film
2006	Pumpkinhead: Ashes to Ashes		Television film
2007	Pumpkinhead: Blood Feud		Television film
2009	Taking Chance	Executive producer	Television film
2010	Mothman		Television film
2010	Witchville		Television film
2011	William & Catherine: A Royal Romance		Television film
2011	A Princess for Christmas	Executive producer	Television film
2012	TalhotBlond	Executive producer	Television film
2013	The Sweeter Side of Life	Executive producer	Television film
2013	Heebie Jeebies		Television film
2013	Flying Monkeys		Television film
2013	When Calls the Heart	Executive producer	Television film
2013	The Christmas Spirit	Executive producer	Television film
2014	A Royal Christmas	Executive producer	Television film
2015	Murder, She Baked: A Chocolate Chip Cookie Mystery	Executive producer	Television film
2015	Murder, She Baked: A Plum Pudding Murder Mystery	Executive producer	Television film
2015	Crown for Christmas	Executive producer	Television film
2015	A Christmas Detour	Executive producer	Television film
2015	A Christmas Melody	Executive producer	Television film
2015	Mariah Carey's Merriest Christmas		Television special
2016	Murder, She Baked: A Peach Cobbler Mystery	Executive producer	Television film
2016	Flower Shop Mystery: Mum's the Word	Executive producer	Television film
2016	Flower Shop Mystery: Snipped in the Bud	Executive producer	Television film
2016	Murder, She Baked: A Deadly Recipe	Executive producer	Television film
2016	The Wedding March	Executive producer	Television film
2016	Flower Shop Mystery: Dearly Depotted	Executive producer	Television film
2016	For Love & Honor	Executive producer	Television film
2016	A Wish for Christmas	Executive producer	Television film
2016	Every Christmas Has a Story	Executive producer	Television film
2016	I'll Be Home for Christmas	Executive producer	Television film
2016	The National Christmas Tree Lighting	Executive producer	Television special
2017	Love on Ice	Executive producer	Television film
2017	A Royal Winter	Executive producer	Television film
2017	Campfire Kiss	Executive producer	Television film
2017	Murder, She Baked: Just Desserts	Executive producer	Television film
2017	Wedding March 2: Resorting to Love	Executive producer	Television film
2017	My Favorite Wedding	Executive producer	Television film
2017	The Saint	Executive producer	Television film
2017	Darrow & Darrow	Executive producer	Television film
2017	Christmas in Angel Falls	Executive producer	Television film
2017	Christmas Encore	Executive producer	Television film
2018	My Secret Valentine	Executive producer	Television film
2018	Wedding March 3: Here Comes the Bride	Executive producer	Television film
2018	Royal Hearts	Executive producer	Television film
2018	A Royal Matchmaker	Executive producer	Television film
2018	Darrow & Darrow: In the Key of Murder	Executive producer	Television film
2018	Wedding March 4: Something Old, Something New	Executive producer	Television film
2018	Darrow & Darrow: Body of Evidence	Executive producer	Television film
2018	Christmas in Love	Executive producer	Television film
2018	Return to Christmas Creek	Executive producer	Television film
2018	Christmas at the Palace	Executive producer	Television film
2018	Pride, Prejudice, and Mistletoe	Executive producer	Television film
2018	Christmas at Grand Valley	Executive producer	Television film
2019	Winter Love Story	Executive producer	Television film
2019	The 27th Annual Movieguide Awards	Executive producer	Television special
2019	The Crossword Mysteries: A Puzzle to Die For	Executive producer	Television film
2019	The Wedding March 5: My Boyfriend's Back	Executive producer	Television film
2019	A Taste of Summer	Executive producer	Television film
2019	Witness to Murder: A Darrow Mystery	Executive producer	Television film
2019	The Crossword Mysteries: Proposing Murder	Executive producer	Television film
2019	Angel Falls: A Novel Holiday	Executive producer	Television film
2019	Christmas in Rome	Executive producer	Television film
2019	Sense, Sensibility & Snowmen	Executive producer	Television film
2020	The Crossword Mysteries: Abracadaver	Executive producer	Television film
2020	A Valentine's Match	Executive producer	Television film
2020	Country at Heart	Executive producer	Television film
2020	Five Star Christmas	Executive Producer	Television film
2020	Christmas Waltz	Executive Producer	Television film
2020	Too Close for Christmas	Executive Producer	Television film
2020	A Christmas Carousel	Executive Producer	Television film
2021	Sweet Carolina	Executive Producer	Television film
2021	Colors of Love	Executive Producer	Television film
2021	An Autumn Romance	Executive Producer	Television Film
2021	A Kindhearted Christmas	Executive Producer	Television Film
2021	Angel Falls Christmas	Executive Producer	Television Film
2021	Royally Wrapped for Christmas	Executive Producer	Television Film
2021	The Great Christmas Switch	Executive Producer	Television Film
2021	Much Ado About Christmas	Executive Producer	Television Film
2021	Christmas Time is Here	Executive Producer	Television Film
2021	Christmas is You	Executive Producer	Television Film
2021	Jingle Bell Princess	Executive Producer	Television Film
2021	A Lot Like Christmas	Executive Producer	Television Film
2021	A Christmas Miracle for Daisy	Executive Producer	Television Film
2021	A Christmas Star	Executive Producer	Television Film
2021	Joy for Christmas	Executive Producer	Television Film
2021	A Christmas Proposal	Executive Producer	Television Film
2021	Christmas Takes Flight	Executive Producer	Television Film
2021	The Housewives of the North Pole	Executive Producer	Television Film
2022	The Winter Palace	Executive Producer	Television Film
2022	Harmony from the Heart	Executive Producer	Television Film
2014–present	When Calls the Heart	Executive producer	
2019–present	When Hope Calls	Executive producer	

==== As a production manager ====
Year	Title	Role	Notes
2011	A Princess for Christmas	Unit production manager	Television film
2012	TalhotBlond	Unit production manager	Television film
2013	The Sweeter Side of Life	Unit production manager	Television film
2013	When Calls the Heart	Production manager	Television film
2014	When Calls the Heart	Unit production manager	Television series
2014	A Royal Christmas	Unit production manager	Television film

==== Miscellaneous crew ====
- Dumb and Dumber (1995–1996) – Creative consultant
