= Peleș Castle =

Neo-Renaissance castle in Sinaia, Romania

Peleș Castle Castelul Peleș
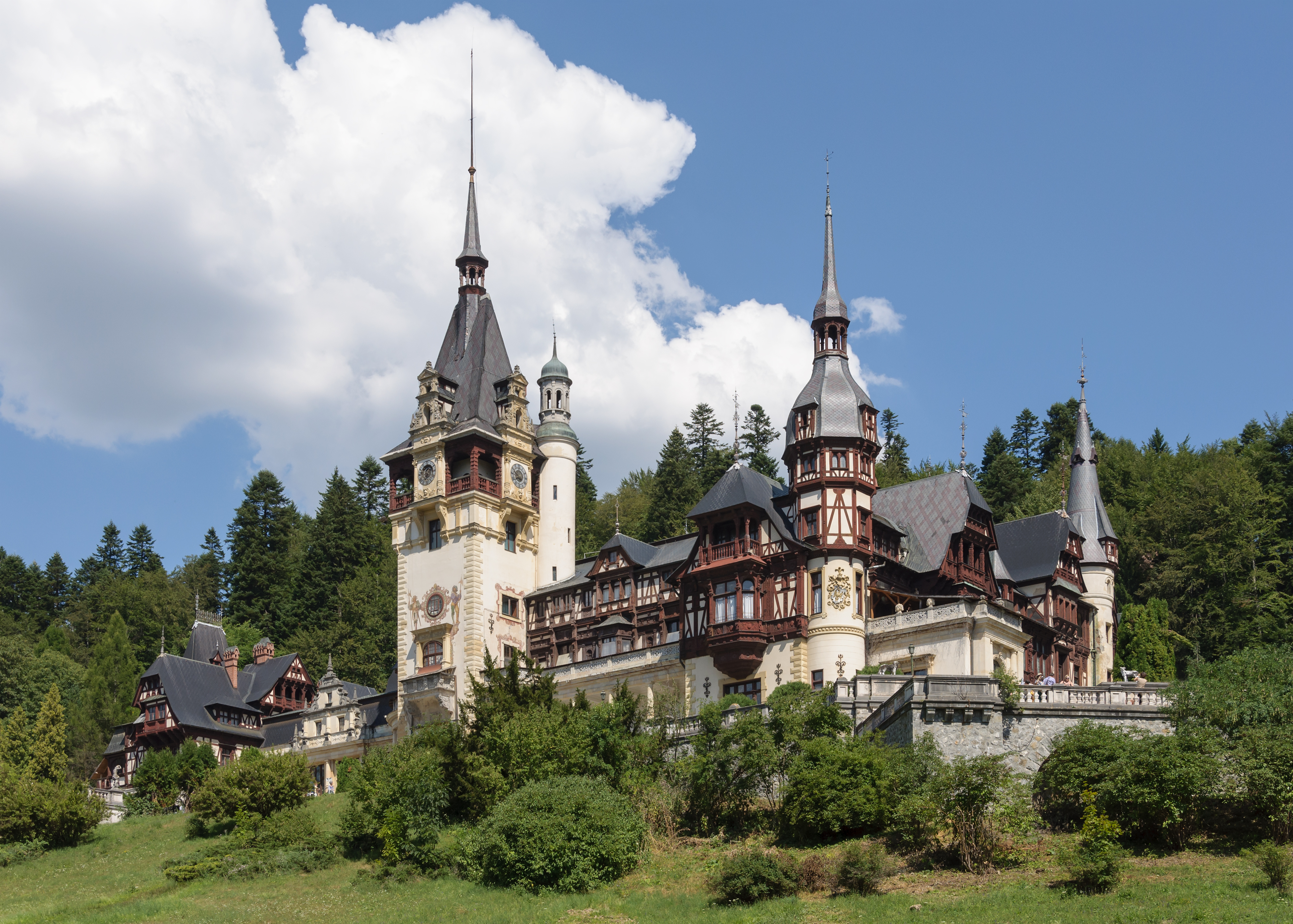
- Peleș Castle in summer
- Interactive map of the Peleș Castle; Castelul Peleș area

General information
- Architectural style: Neo-Renaissance
- Location: Sinaia, Romania
- Coordinates: 45.35984°N 25.54265°E
- Construction started: 1873
- Completed: 1914
- Cost: 16,000,000 gold Romanian (approximate) lei (approx. $US 120 million today) – Cost is until the castle's opening in 1883. Further major improvements were made until 1914.
- Client: King Carol I of Romania
- Owner: Romanian royal family

Design and construction
- Architects: Johannes Schultz; Carol Benesch; Karel Liman

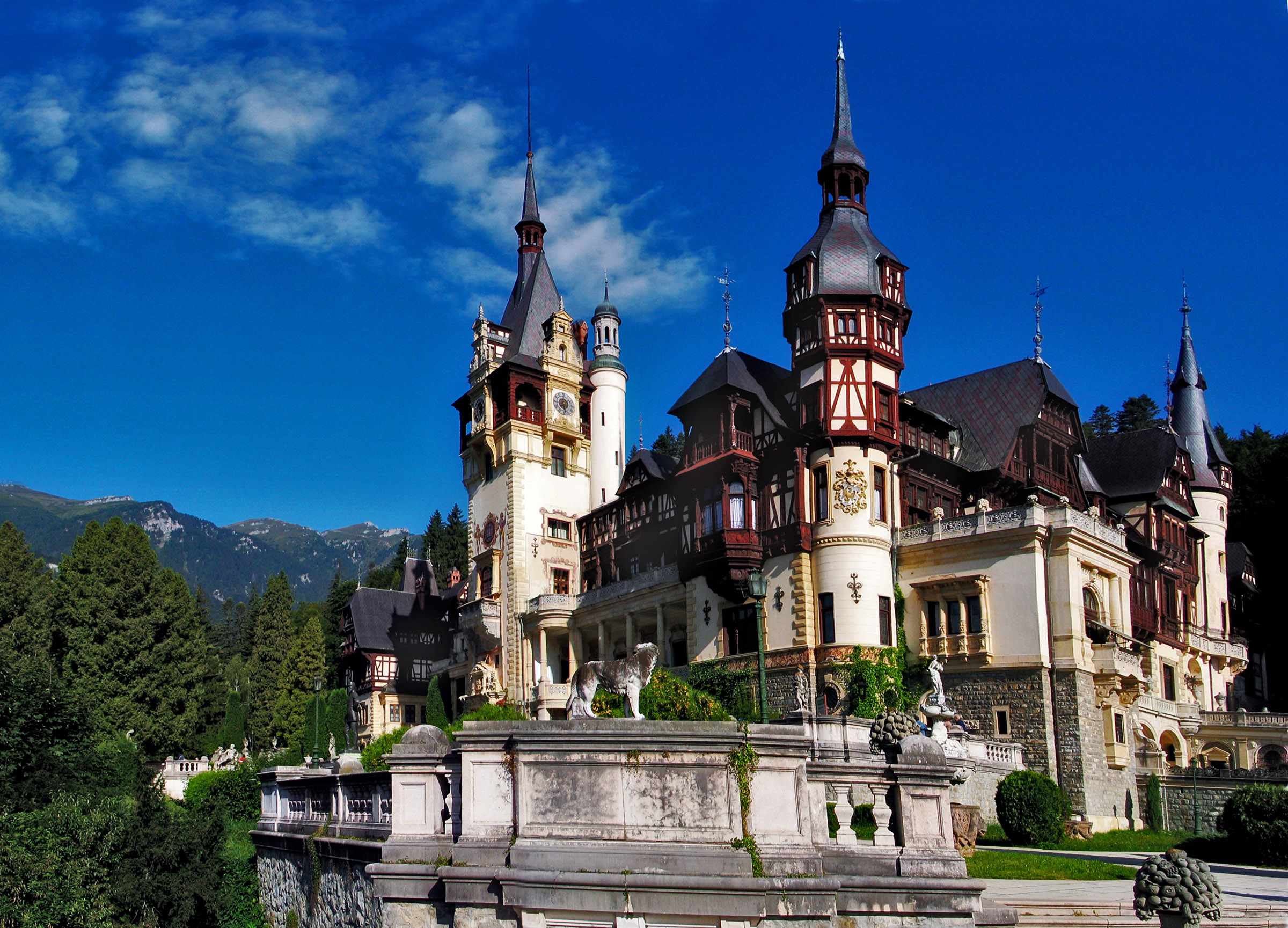
Terrace

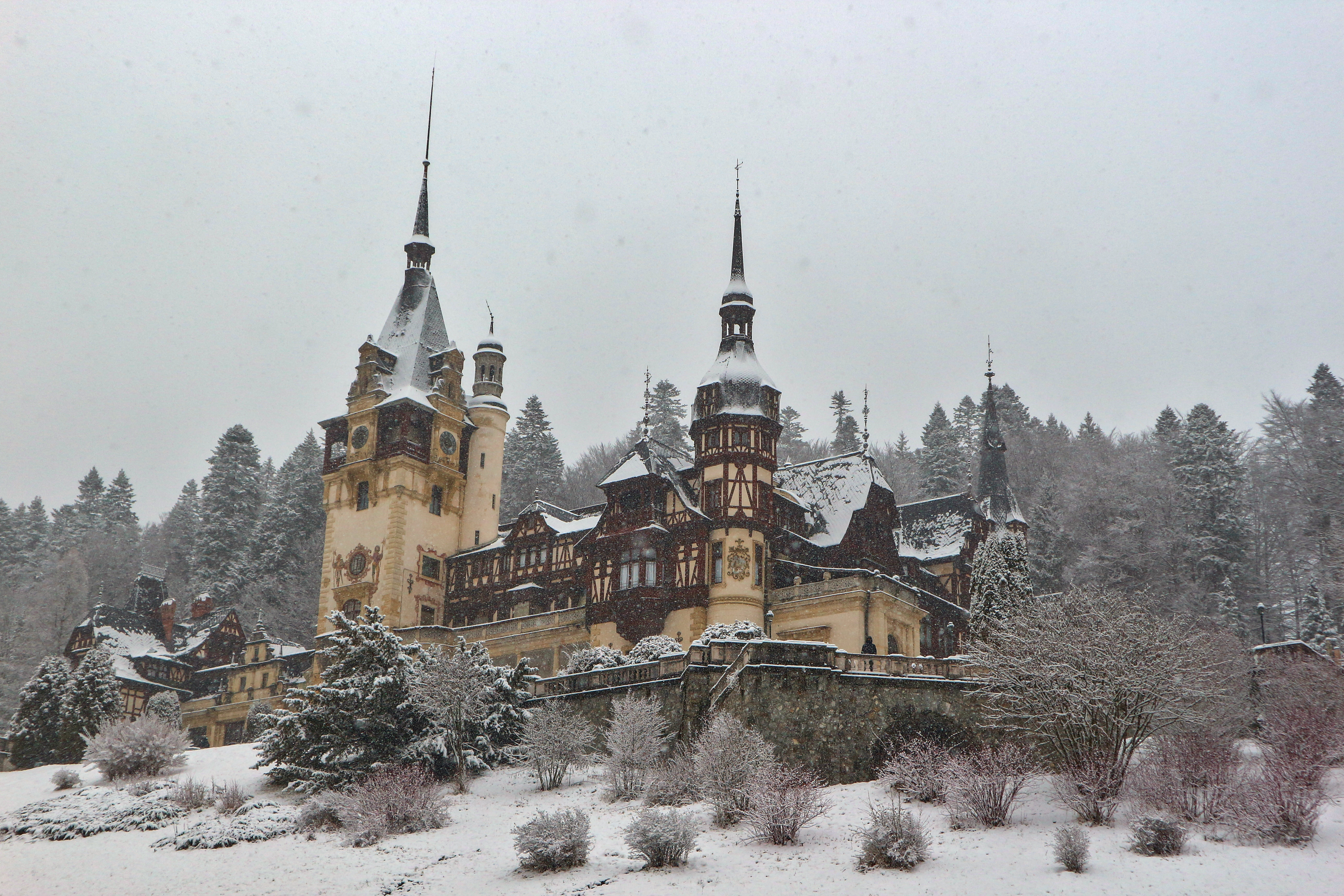
Peleș Castle in the winter, 2021

Peleș Castle (Romanian: Castelul Peleș pronounced [kaˈstelul ˈpeleʃ]) is a Neo-Renaissance palace in the Royal Domain of Sinaia in the Carpathian Mountains, near Sinaia, in Prahova County, Romania, on an existing medieval route linking Transylvania and Wallachia, built between 1873 and 1914. Its inauguration was held in 1883. It was constructed for King Carol I of Romania.

== Location ==
The complex is northwest of the town of Sinaia, which is 48 kilometres (30 mi) from Brașov and 124 kilometres (77 mi) from Bucharest. In the southeastern Carpathian Mountains, the complex is composed of three monuments: Peleș Castle, Pelișor Castle, and the Foișor Hunting Lodge.

== History ==
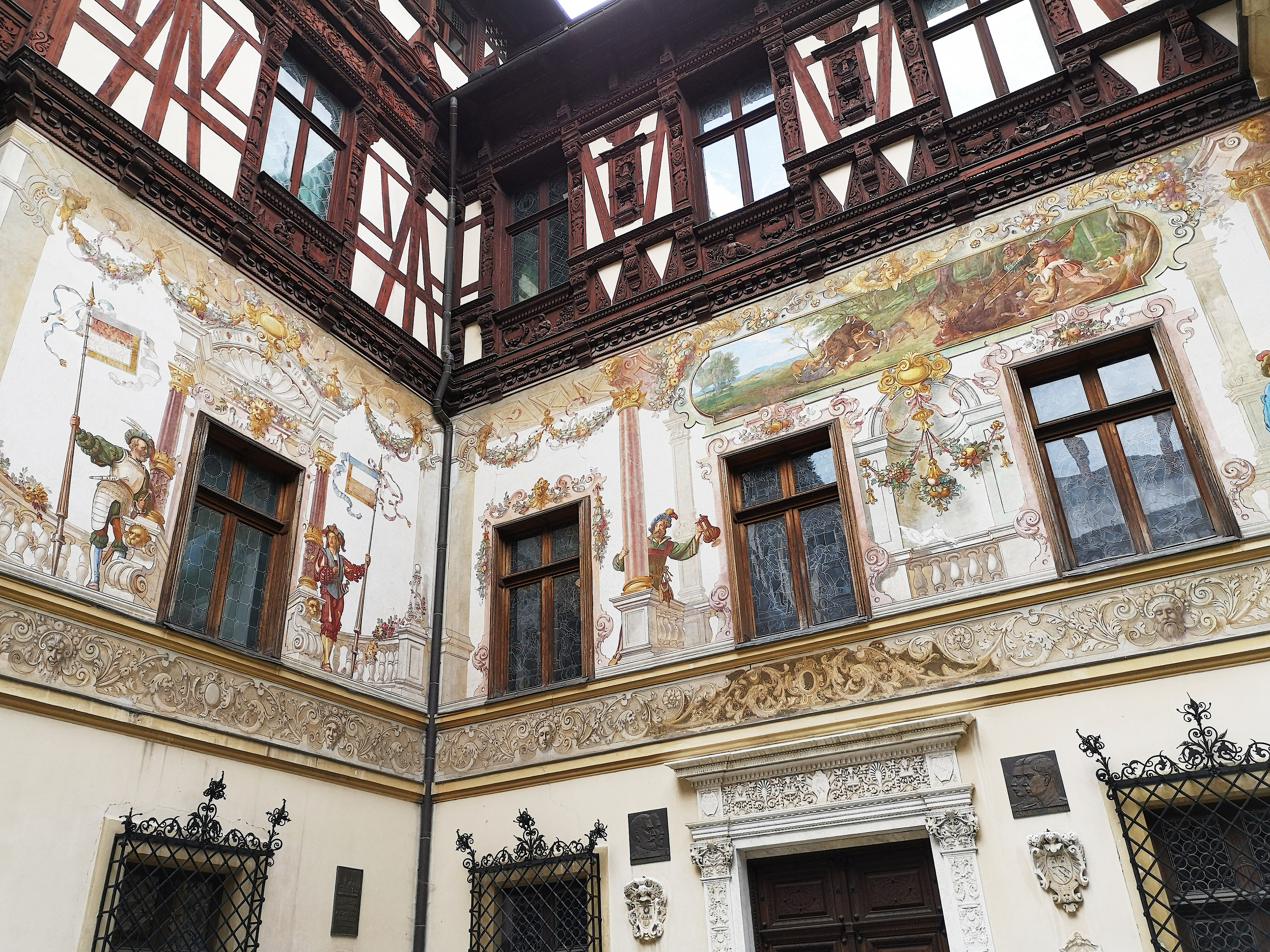
Murals in the inner court

When King Carol I of Romania (1839–1914), under whose reign the country gained its independence, first visited the site of the future castle in 1866, he fell in love with the magnificent mountain scenery. In 1872, the Crown purchased 5 square kilometres (1.9 sq mi) of land near the Piatra Arsă River. The estate was named the Royal Estate of Sinaia. The King commissioned the construction of a royal hunting preserve and summer retreat on the property, and the foundation was laid for Peleș Castle on 22 August 1873. Several auxiliary buildings were built simultaneously with the castle: the guards' chambers, the Economat Building, the Foișor hunting lodge, the royal stables, and a power plant. Peleș became the world's first castle fully powered by locally produced electricity.

The first three design plans submitted for Peleș were copies of other palaces in Western Europe, and King Carol I rejected them all as lacking originality and being too costly. German architect Johannes Schultz won the project by presenting a more original plan, something that appealed to the King's taste: a grand palatial alpine castle combining different features of classic European styles, mostly following Italian elegance and German aesthetics along Renaissance lines. Works were also led by architect Carol Benesch. Later additions were made between 1893 and 1914 by the Czech architect Karel Liman, who designed the towers, including the main central tower, which is 66 metres (217 ft) in height. The Sipot Building, which served as Liman's headquarters during the construction, was built later on. Liman would supervise the building of the nearby Pelișor Castle (1889–1903, the future residence of King Ferdinand I and Queen Marie of Romania), as well as of King Ferdinand's villa in the Royal Sheepfold Meadow. King Carol I and Queen Elizabeth lived in Foişor Villa during construction, as King Ferdinand and Queen Marie had during the construction of Pelișor Castle.

The cost of the work on the castle undertaken between 1875 and 1914 was estimated to be 16,000,000 Romanian lei in gold. Between three and four hundred men worked on the construction. During the construction phase, Queen Elizabeth wrote in her journal:

Italians were masons, Romanians were building terraces, the Gypsies were coolies. Albanians and Greeks worked in stone, Germans and Hungarians were carpenters. Turks were burning brick. Engineers were Polish and the stone carvers were Czech. The Frenchmen were drawing, the Englishmen were measuring, and so was then when you could see hundreds of national costumes and fourteen languages in which they spoke, sang, cursed and quarreled in all dialects and tones, a joyful mix of men, horses, cart oxen and domestic buffaloes.

Construction slowed during the Romanian War of Independence against the Ottoman Empire in 1877–1878, but soon afterwards the plans grew in size and construction was quite rapid. In the 1883 inaugural journey of the Orient Express to Bucharest, passengers from Paris were invited to Peleș Castle by Queen Elisabeth of Wied as King Carol I ceremoniously put the last brick in place to celebrate the castle's completion. This initiative by Queen Elisabeth was part of an effort to promote Peleș Castle and Romania's Carpathians to a broader audience. Peleș Castle had its official Royal Ball of Inauguration on 7 October 1883. Thereafter, Carol II of Romania was born at the castle in 1893, giving meaning to the phrase "cradle of the dynasty, cradle of the nation" that Carol I bestowed upon Peleș Castle. Carol II lived in Foișor Villa for periods during his reign. Princess Maria died there in 1874.

After the forced abdication of King Michael I of Romania in 1947, Communist Romania seized all royal property, including the Peleș Estate. The castle was opened as a tourist attraction for a short time. It also served as a recreation and resting place for Romanian cultural personalities. The castle was declared a museum in 1953. Nicolae Ceaușescu closed the entire estate between 1975 and 1990, during the last years of the Communist regime. The area was declared a "State Protocol Interest Area", and the only persons permitted on the property were maintenance and military personnel.

Ceaușescu did not like the castle very much and rarely visited. In the 1980s, some of the timber was infested with Serpula lacrymans. After the Romanian Revolution of 1989, Peleș and Pelișor Castle were re-established as heritage sites and opened to the public. Today, Foișor Castle serves as a presidential residence. The Economat Building and the Guard's Chambers Building are now hotels and restaurants. Some of the other buildings on the Peleș Estate were converted to tourist villas and some are now "state protocol buildings". In 2006, the Romanian government announced the restitution of the Royal Domain including all properties and land within the domain to the former monarch, King Michael I. Negotiations soon began between the king and the government of Romania, and were concluded in 2007. The castle is on lease from the royal family to the Romanian state. Peleș Castle receives between a quarter and almost a half million visitors annually.

Throughout its history, the castle hosted some important personalities, from royalty and politicians to artists. One of the most memorable visits was that of Kaiser Franz Joseph I of Austria-Hungary on 2 October 1896, who later wrote in a letter:

The Royal Castle amongst other monuments, surrounded by extremely pretty landscape with gardens built on terraces, all at the edge of dense forests. The castle itself is very impressive through the riches it has accumulated: old and new canvases, old furniture, weapons, all sort of curious, everything placed with good taste. We took a long hike in the mountains, afterwards we picnicked on the green grass, surrounded by the Gypsy music. We took many pictures, and the atmosphere was extremely pleasant.

Artists like George Enescu, Sarah Bernhardt, Jacques Thibaud and Vasile Alecsandri visited often as guests of Queen Elizabeth of Romania (herself a writer also known under the pen name of Carmen Sylva). In more recent times, many foreign dignitaries such as Richard Nixon, Gerald Ford, Muammar al-Gaddafi, and Yasser Arafat were welcomed at the castle.

The castle was featured in the 2009 film The Brothers Bloom. The exterior of the castle is used to represent a large estate in New Jersey, the home of an eccentric billionaire played by Rachel Weisz.

The castle was featured in the Netflix original film A Christmas Prince and its two sequels, A Christmas Prince: The Royal Wedding and A Christmas Prince: The Royal Baby. It was also featured in the Hallmark Channel movie A Princess for Christmas (2011) and Royal Matchmaker (2018).

== Description ==
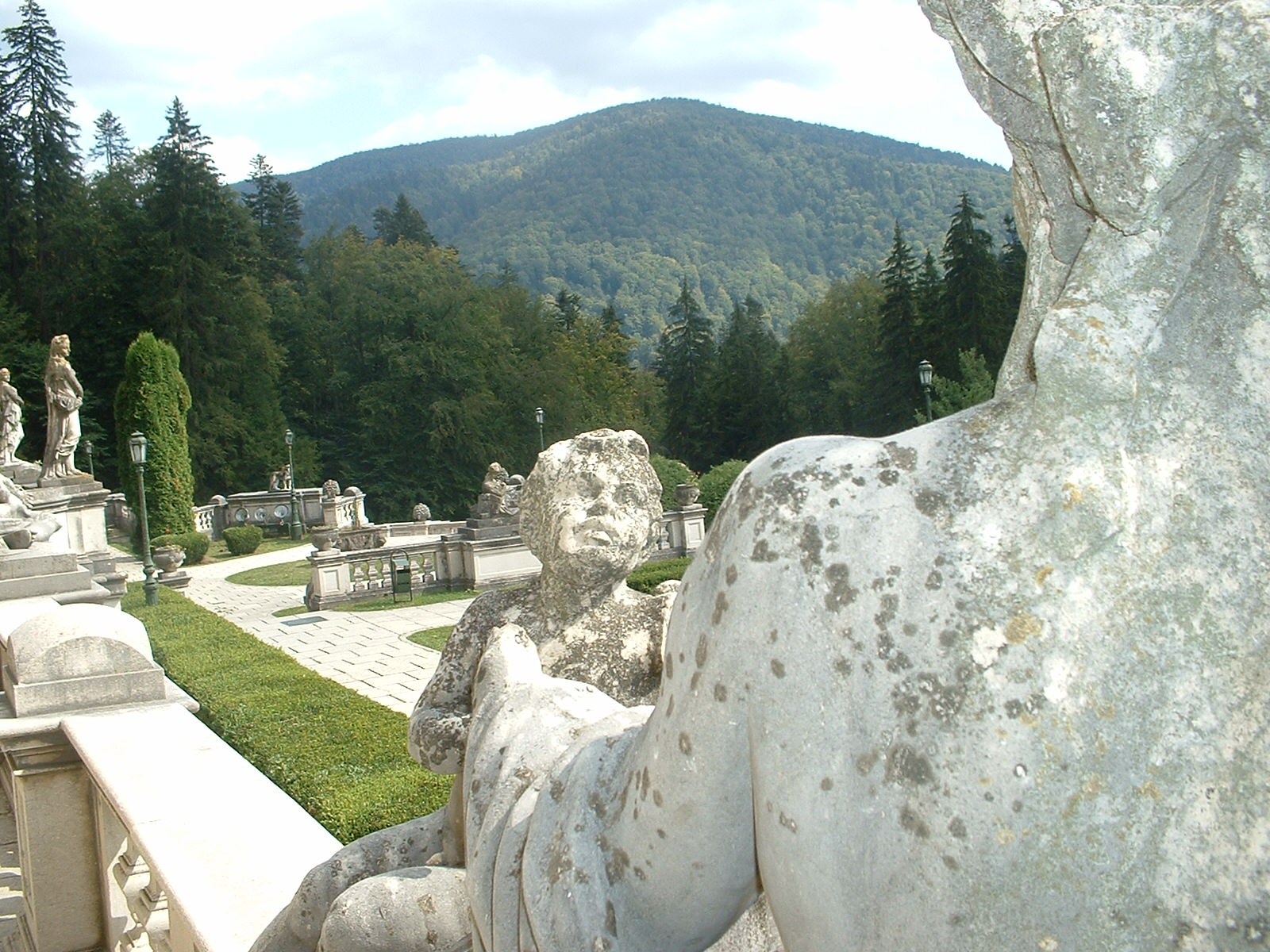
Statues in the courtyard with the Carpathians in background

By form and function, Peleș is a palace, but it is consistently called a castle. Its architectural style is a romantically inspired blend Neo-Renaissance and Gothic Revival similar to Neuschwanstein Castle in Bavaria. A Saxon influence can be observed in the interior courtyard facades, which have allegorical hand-painted murals and ornate fachwerk similar to that seen in northern European alpine architecture. Interior decoration is mostly Baroque influenced, with heavy carved woods and exquisite fabrics.

Peleș Castle has a 3,200-square-metre (34,000 sq ft) floor plan with over 170 rooms, many with dedicated themes from world cultures (in a similar fashion as other Romanian palaces, such as Cotroceni Palace). Themes vary by function (offices, libraries, armouries, art galleries) or by style (Florentine, Turkish, Moorish, French, Imperial); all the rooms are lavishly furnished and decorated to the slightest detail. There are 30 bathrooms. The establishment has collections of statues, paintings, furniture, arms and armor, gold, silver, stained glass, ivory, porcelain, tapestries and rugs. The collection of arms and armour has over 4,000 pieces, divided between Eastern and Western war pieces and ceremonial or hunting pieces, spreading over four centuries of history. Oriental rugs come from many sources: Bukhara, Mosul, Isparta, Saruk and Smyrna. The porcelain is from Sèvres and Meissen; the leather is from Córdoba. The hand-painted stained glass vitralios, which are mostly Swiss.

A towering statue of King Carol I by Raffaello Romanelli overlooks the main entrance. Many other statues are present on the seven Italian neo-Renaissance terrace gardens, mostly of Carrara marble executed by the Italian sculptor Romanelli. The gardens also host fountains, urns, stairways, guarding lions, marble paths and other decorative pieces.

Peleș Castle shelters a painting collection of almost 2,000 pieces. Angelo de Gubernatis (1840–1913) was an Italian writer who arrived in 1898 in Sinaia as a guest of the royal family:

Inaugurated in 1883, Peleș Castle is not only a pleasant place during summer time; it has been conceived to be also a national monument, meant to keep the trophies of the Plevna victory, which explains the simple but majestic style. The castle's courtyard – Bramantes type – with a fountain in the middle, in the most accurate Renaissance style, pleasantly surprises the visitor. The courtyard has a merry decoration, made out of plants and flowers; all round, the building's facades are animated by elegant drawings. The interior of the castle is a true wonder, due to the beauty and richness of the sculpted wood and the stained glass windows. As you get in the vestibule, you are on the Honor Staircase, in front of the most important rulers of old Romania: Holy Stephen the Great, and Michael the Brave. In a proud attitude, wearing whether a fur cap or with the gold crown on their heads, they impress through the brilliant dressing, in which the white of ermine blends with the emerald green or the red of the large mantle. On the right and on left side of the two rulers, as servant knights, four shield bearers carry the Romanian Provinces' escutcheons. Inside the Queen's library, over the groups of children symbolizing poetry and science, there is the image of Ulfilas (311–383 AD) a Goth religious ruler, from the northern side of Danube River, translating the Bible in their language and bringing his contribution in spreading Christianity, a Christian apostle of the Romans, and the image of Dante Alighieri, the creator of western poetry. Passing the library and getting into the dormitory, we will meet the image of Genies and Allegories of Painting and Music, as well as a series of legendary themes. Inside the apartments reserved for the honor guests, a number of coat-of-arms were shining through their heraldic abundance, speaking about the ancestors of the Royal Family. But among all, the glass paintings from the Peleș Castle are, beyond any doubt, the most profound and shining. Here, the subjects are taken out of Alecsandri's poetry.

== Museum ==
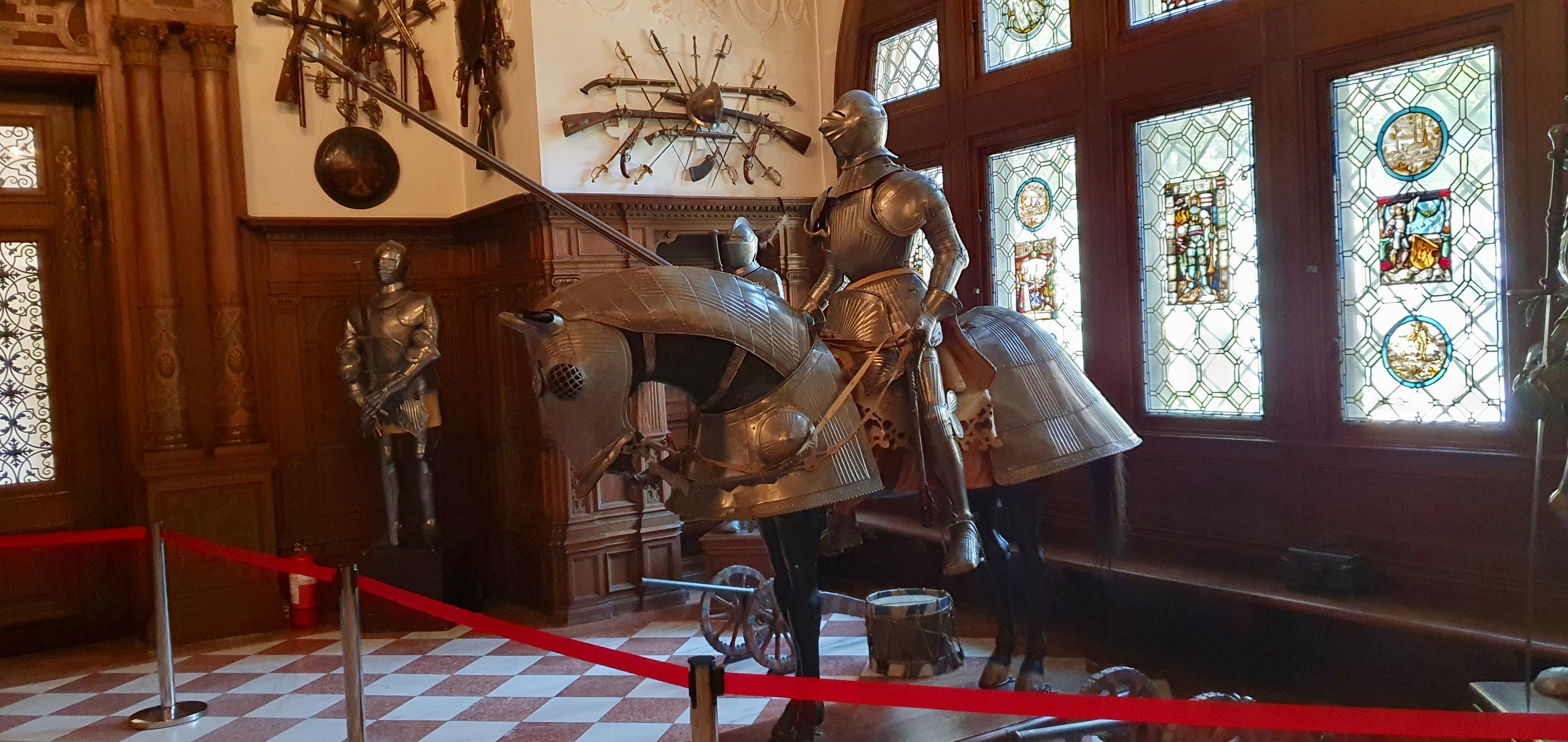
Maximilian armour in the arsenal

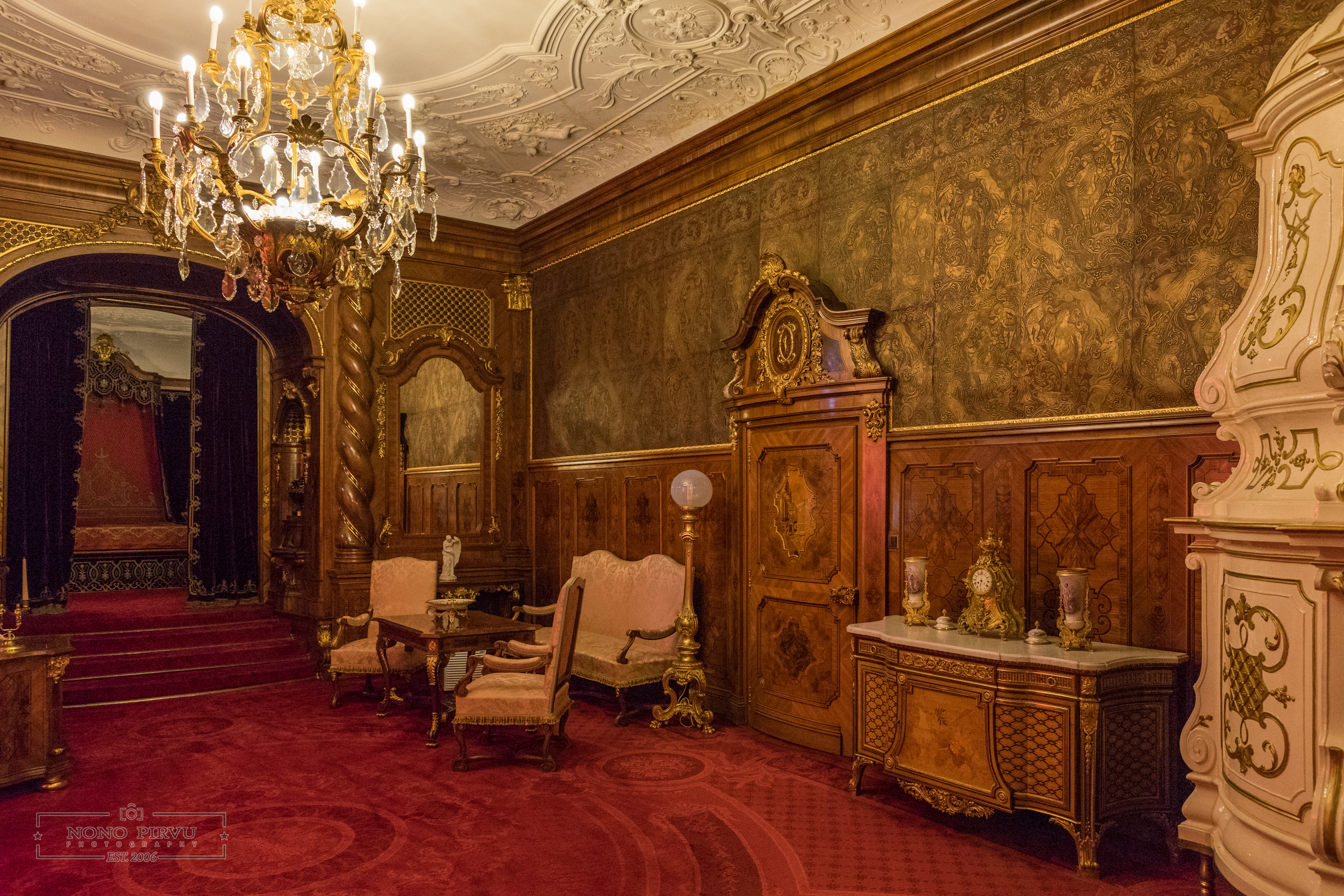
The Imperial Suite

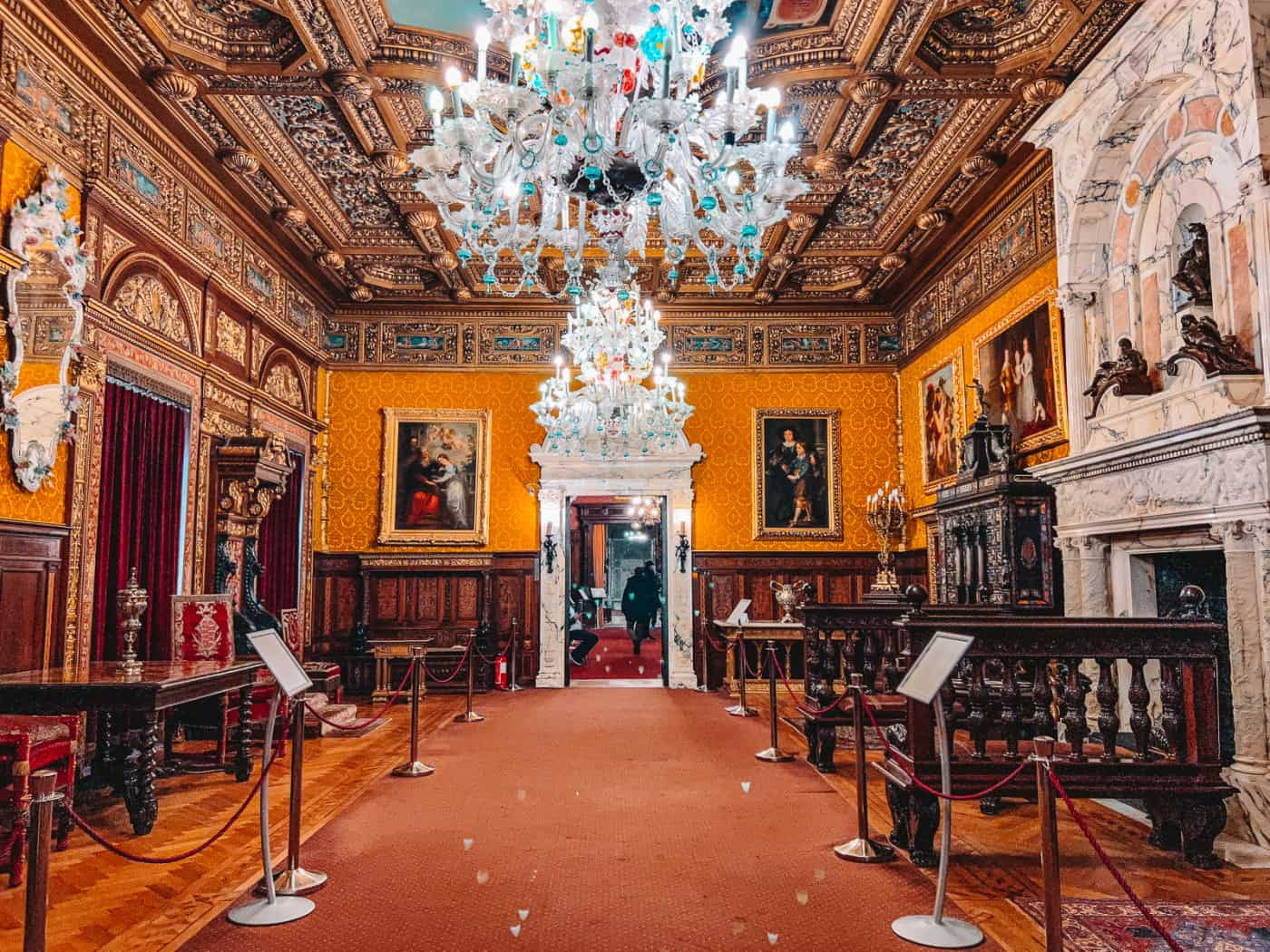
The Florentine Room

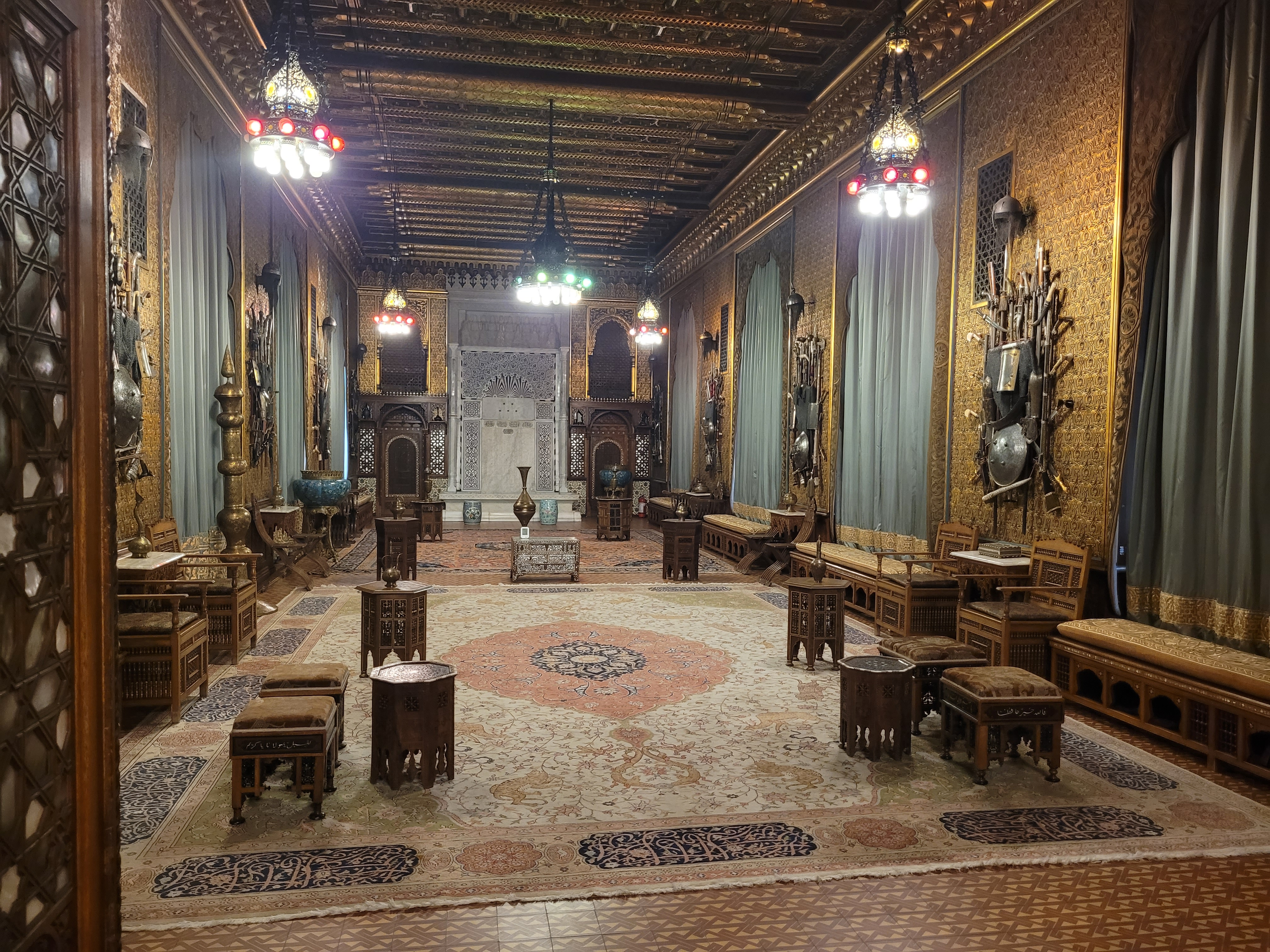
The Moorish Room

Public visits are made within guided tours. One of the tours is limited to the ground floor, another adds the first floor and the complete tour includes the second floor. Admission is charged, and the visiting hours are from 9 am to 5 pm; Wednesday through Sunday. The castle is closed on Mondays and Tuesdays, and tickets are required for a specific time slot. These visiting hours are subject to change by the Romanian Ministry of Culture. The castle is closed in November each year for maintenance and cleaning.

The most notable grand rooms are:

Holul de Onoare (The Hall of Honour) was finished completely only in 1911, under the guidance of Karel Liman. It spreads over three floors. Walls are dressed in exquisitely carved woodwork, mostly European walnut and exotic timbers. Bas-reliefs, alabaster sculptures, and retractable stained glass panels complete the decor. The hall also contains the Ancestors Gallery, a collection of paintings commissioned by King Carol from the "Künstler-Compagnie" which depict the ancestors of the House of Hohenzollern.

Apartamentul Imperial (The Imperial Suite) is believed to be a tribute to the Austrian Emperor Franz Joseph I, who visited the palace as a friend of the Romanian royal family. Hence, decorator Auguste Bembe preferred the sumptuous Austrian Baroque in style of Empress Maria Theresa. A perfectly preserved five-hundred-year-old Cordoban tooled leather wall cover is the rarest of such quality.

Sala Mare de Arme (The Grand Armory or The Arsenal) is where 1,600 of the 4,000 pieces of weaponry and armor reside. One of Europe's finest collection of hunting and war implements, timelined between 14th and 19th century, are on display. The king added pieces used in his victory against the Ottoman Turks during the War of Independence. Famous are the complete Maximilian armour for horse and rider and a 15th-century German "nobles only" executioner's sword. Also on display are a wide array of polearms (glaives, halberds, lances, hunting spears), firearms (muskets, blunderbusses, snaphaunces, flintlocks, pistols), axes, crossbows, and swords (rapiers, sabers, broadswords, and many others).

Sala Mică de Arme (The Small Armory) is where predominantly Oriental (mostly Indo-Persian, Ottoman and Arab) arms and armor pieces are on exhibit, many of them made of gold and silver, and inlaid with precious stones. Included are chainmail armor, helmets, scimitars, yataghans, daggers, matchlocks, lances, pistols, shields, axes, and spears.

Sala de Teatru (The Playhouse) is decorated in Louis XIV style, with sixty seats and a Royal Box. Architectural decoration and mural paintings are signed by Gustav Klimt and Franz Matsch.

Sala Florentină (The Florentine Room) combines revived elements of the Italian Renaissance, mostly from Florence. Most impressive are the solid bronze doors executed in Rome; ateliers of Luigi Magni; and the Grand Marble Fireplace executed by Paunazio with Michelangelo motifs.

Salonul Maur (The Moorish Salon) was executed under the guidance of Charles Lecompte de Nouy, and is meant to embody elements of North-African and Hispanic Moorish style. Mother-of-pearl inlaid furniture, fine Persian Sarouk and Ottoman Isparta rugs, and Oriental weapons and armor are perhaps the most expressive elements. The salon has an indoor marble fountain.

Salonul Turcesc (The Turkish Parlor) emulates an Ottoman "joie de vivre" atmosphere—a room full of Turkish İzmir rugs and copperware from Anatolia and Persia. It was used as a smoking room for gentlemen. Walls are covered in hand-made textiles like silk brocades from the Siegert shops of Vienna.

In something remarkable in comparison to most recent-era royal families, the monarchs shared a bedroom.

== Present day ==
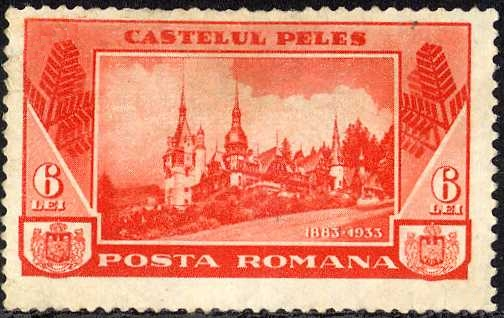
1933 stamp

Originally personal property of the royal family, Peleș Castle was nationalized when King Michael I was forced to abdicate and into exile by the Socialist Republic of Romania in 1947. In 1997, the castle was returned to the royal family in a long judicial case that was finally concluded in 2007. Michael I subsequently said the castle should continue to house the Peleș National Museum, as well as being occasionally used for public royal ceremonies.

Michael I's heir Margareta, Custodian of the Romanian Crown occasionally uses the castle for receptions, investitures and other public events. On 10 May (Monarchy Day) 2016, the royal family hosted a large reception, garden party and concert at Peleș Castle to mark the 150th anniversary of the Romanian Royal Dynasty, where Margareta's standard was flown from Peleș Castle—the first time since 1947 that a royal standard had flown from the castle.

In August 2016, the body of Queen Anne lay in state in the Hall of Honour at Peleș Castle in a ceremony attended by the Romanian presidents Klaus Iohannis and Moldovan president Nicolae Timofti, as well as Prime Minister Dacian Cioloș and other national leaders. This was followed on 13 December 2017 by King Michael I Lying in State in the same location in a similar, but larger, ceremony prior to his state funeral in Bucharest and burial in Curtea de Argeș Cathedral.

== See also ==
- List of castles in Romania
- Seven Wonders of Romania
- Tourism in Romania
- Villages with fortified churches in Transylvania
