= 20 Cigarettes =

20 Cigarettes may refer to:

- 20 Cigarettes (play), play and radio play written by Marcy Kahan
- 20 Cigarettes (film), 2010 Italian film
- "20 Cigarettes" (song), by Morgan Wallen
