= Time of Death (disambiguation) =

Time of death is the presumed moment a death has occurred.

Time of Death may also refer to:

- Time of Death, a 2013 American documentary television series
- "Time of Death" (Arrow), a 2014 episode in season 2 of the TV series Arrow
- "Time of Death" (The Rookie), a 2018 episode of the TV series The Rookie
- Time of Death, a 2013 Canadian TV film starring Kathleen Robertson and Gianpaolo Venuta
- Time of Death (2025 film), a 2025 American film starring Michael Kelly and Kevin Pollak
