= Daniel Fathers =

British actor

- Born: Daniel James Fathers; 23 March 1966 (age 60); London, England
- Occupation: Actor/Screenwriter
- Years active: 1999–present

Daniel Fathers (born 23 March 1966) is an English actor. He is known for his role as Brown Cesario in the first 2 Camp Rock films. In 2018, Fathers joined the cast of Snatch (Sony Pictures Television) as a series regular (Season 2), starring opposite Rupert Grint, as the American Gangster Clarence Perry. Shot in Málaga, Spain, it was to be released in September 2018.

== Filmography ==
=== Film ===
Year	Title	Role	Notes
2002	Global Heresy	Male Reporter / Journalist #1	
2002	Night's Noontime	Professor James Murray	Short film
2003	Rhinoceros Eyes	Producer	Uncredited
2007	The Tracey Fragments	Elegant Pimp Daddy	
2008	Pontypool	Nigel Healing	
2014	An American Girl: Isabelle Dances Into the Spotlight	Mr. Kosoloff	
2016	The Void	Vincent	
2017	A Christmas Prince	Rudy	
2018	Mute	Sgt. Robert Kloskowski	
2019	Project Ithaca	Perry Bulmer	
2025	The Last Supper	Joseph of Arimathea	

=== Television ===
Year	Title	Role	Notes
2000	Relic Hunter	Bligh	Episode: "Lost Contact"
2000	Livin' for Love: The Natalie Cole Story	A&R Guy	Television film
2001	Exhibit A: Secrets of Forensic Science	Detective Randy Horn	Episode: "The Orphan"
2001	Leap Years	Limo Driver	
2002	Tracker	Tina's Dad	Episode: "Children of the Night"
2002	Haven't We Met Before?	Clerk	Television film
2002	The Brady Bunch in the White House	Priest	Television film
2003	Street Time	Jared Endelman	Episode: "Follow the Money"
2005	Tilt	Muff Lanagan	2 episodes
2005	Trump Unauthorized	Ivana's Lawyer	Television film
2005	Plague City: SARS in Toronto	Stanton	Television film
2005	Murder in the Hamptons	British Reporter	Television film
2005	Beach Girls	Reverend Evan Gallagher	2 episodes
2005	The Murdoch Mysteries	Gentleman / Audience Member	Episode: "Under the Dragon's Tail"
2005	Crazy for Christmas	Arthur Finnegan	Television film
2006	Beautiful People	Richard Manning	2 episodes
2006	The Jane Show	Cute Guy	Episode: "Tasting"
2006	72 Hours: True Crime	Dr. John Schneeberger	Episode: "Good Doctor"
2008	The Border	Casper Malan	Episode: "Bodies on the Ground"
2008	Murdoch Mysteries	Galvin Baker	Episode: "Child's Play"
2008	Camp Rock	Brown Cesario	Television film
2009	90210	Nic	Episode: "Of Heartbreaks and Hotels"
2009	Trust Me	Jan Elfers	Episode: "You Got Chocolate Peanut Butter"
2009	The Line	Colin	6 episodes
2009–2011	Heartland	Stewart Forrest	3 episodes
2010	Camp Rock 2: The Final Jam	Brown Cessario	Television film
2011	Combat Hospital	Sergeant Harry Gleed	2 episodes
2011	Flashpoint	Tyler Hewitt	Episode: "Through a Glass Darkly"
2011	The Adventures of Chuck and Friends	Mr. Scoopinbottom (voice)	Episode: "Prince Chuck" / "The Dirt on Chuck"
2012	King	T.J. Morris	3 episodes
2012–2013	Really Me	John Donkers	2 episodes
2012	The Listener	Dr. Julian Hennessey	Episode: "Lockdown"
2012	Transporter: The Series	Jimmy Reeves	Episode: "Payback"
2013	Time of Death	Captain Vaughn	Television film
2014	Reign	Alec	Episode: "Sacrifice"
2014	Remedy	Dr. Kitleman	Episode: "Scary Bears"
2015	Orphan Black	Terry	Episode: "Insolvent Phantom of Tomorrow"
2016	Dark Matter	Hansmeed	3 episodes
2018	Snatch	Clarence	10 episodes
2024	House of the Dragon	Humfrey Lefford	Episodes: "Smallfolk" and "The Queen Who Ever Was"
2024	The Ark	Avega	2 episodes
2026	The Pendragon Cycle: Rise of the Merlin	Avallach	3 episodes
TBA	The Dark Tower	Abel Vannay	

=== Video games ===
Year	Title	Role
2013	Tom Clancy's Splinter Cell: Blacklist	English UK Soldier 1 (voice)
