= Six Bullets =

- Directed by: Ernie Barbarash
- Written by: Chad Law; Evan Law
- Produced by: Brad Krevoy
- Starring: Jean-Claude Van Damme; Joe Flanigan; Anna-Louise Plowman; Charlotte Beaumont
- Cinematography: Phil Parmet
- Edited by: Peter Devaney Flanagan
- Music by: Neal Acree
- Production companies: Motion Picture Corporation of America; Rodin Entertainment
- Distributed by: Sony Pictures Home Entertainment
- Release date: September 11, 2012
- Running time: 115 minutes
- Country: United States
- Language: English
- Budget: $10 million

Six Bullets is a 2012 American action film directed by Ernie Barbarash, produced by Brad Krevoy and starring Jean-Claude Van Damme, Joe Flanigan, Anna-Louise Plowman, and Charlotte Beaumont. The film was released on direct-to-video in the United States on September 11, 2012.

== Plot ==
Veteran mercenary Samson Gaul (Jean-Claude Van Damme) is retired from combat when his actions resulted in the deaths of helpless victims, but now he's the last hope for a desperate father. Mixed martial artist, Andrew Fayden (Joe Flanigan) knows how to fight, but alone he's unprepared to navigate the corrupt streets of a foreign city to find his kidnapped daughter. Together, these two try to stop a network of criminals that prey upon the innocent.

== Cast ==
- Jean-Claude Van Damme as Samson Gaul
- Joe Flanigan as Andrew Fayden
- Anna-Louise Plowman as Monica Fayden
- Charlotte Beaumont as Becky Fayden
- Steve Nicolson as Inspector Kvitko
- Uriel Emil Pollack as Vlad
- Louis Dempsey as Stelu
- Mark Lewis as Bogdanov
- Kristopher Van Varenberg (Kristopher Van Damme) as Selwyn Gaul
- Bianca Van Varenberg (Bianca Van Damme) as Amalia
- Lia Sinchevici as Marina
- Andrei Runcanu as Luca
- Florin Busuioc as Hotel Manager
- Matei Calin as Victor
- Celesta Shanti Hodge as Fiona
- Sorin Cristen as Lead Agent

== Home media ==
DVD was released in Region 1 in the United States on 11 September 2012, it was distributed by Sony Pictures Home Entertainment. DVD was released by StudioCanal in the United Kingdom in Region 2 on 1 October 2012.
