= Witchville =

2010 fantasy-adventure film

- Promotional poster
- Written by: John Werner; Amy Krell
- Directed by: Pearry Reginald Teo
- Starring: Luke Goss; Ed Speleers; Andrew Pleavin; Sarah Douglas; MyAnna Buring
- Country of origin: United Kingdom
- Original language: English

Production
- Producers: Mike Callaghan; Amy Krell; Brad Krevoy; Reuben Liber
- Running time: 88 minutes
- Production company: Sci-Fi Original Movie

Original release
- Network: Syfy
- Release: 22 May 2010

Witchville is a 2010 made-for-television fantasy-adventure film based on witchcraft in a medieval feudal time period, written by John Werner and Amy Krell, and directed by Pearry Reginald Teo. The film was released and distributed by Syfy Network and it stars Luke Goss, Sarah Douglas, MyAnna Buring and Eragon star, Ed Speleers. The film premiered on 22 May 2010 in the USA via Syfy Channel.

== Plot ==
Prince Malachi returns to the kingdom of Draeganoth to find his father has died and the kingdom is in disarray. Kramer, a witchhunter, warns that there is no famine or pestilence, that the troubles are caused by witches and that with his skills and book of magic they might have a chance of defeating them. Malachi cannot believe there is no more rational explanation but gives Kramer a chance to prove himself and gathers the villagers. Kramer casts a spell that creates a red cloud that moves towards an old woman, and he calls for the townspeople to burn the witch. As she burns she cries out and warns that the Red Queen is coming.

Malachi and his friends set out on a quest to destroy the witches and restore the kingdom. They battle a group of brigands, whom Malachi convinces to join them in their quest. The group comes to a town where they are welcomed and offered hospitality. They decide to continue with their quest but the red cloud comes out of their host revealing enemies and the Red Queen herself. They are overwhelmed, Erik is killed, Jason is taken prisoner, and the rest of the group is forced to retreat.

The Red Queen attacks the castle, wanting the book of magic. Malachi tells Kramer to flee and hide the book. The Red Queen reveals that she is Malachi's mother. The former king was desperate for an heir and she gave him a daughter and a son but when the boy died she used her powers to revive him. Afraid of her powers the king banished her. Jozefa overhears, learning that she has a brother. The Red Queen urges Malachi to join her and to hand over the book, but when he refuses she throws him in the dungeon with Kramer.

Before Kramer dies he realises that as Malachi being of the same blood as the Red Queen, he alone fulfills the prophecy of how to kill her. Jason convinces Jozefa to turn against the Red Queen and release him and then Malachi. Together they confront the Red Queen but cannot beat her. Then Malachi begins to understand the spell Kramer had taught him earlier, and realizes that he must kill himself and release the energy she once used to restore him. Malachi tries to stab his mother and she deflects the blade into him. He falls down. Josefa takes the knife and stabs herself to mingle their blood. And Malachi returns it to his mother completing the circle by stabbing her successfully this time. Looking into her eyes he recites the spell shown to him by Kramer from the book. "Not of my mother. Nor my father. I am born of the Light. My faith surrounds me. It protects me from your might. The earth. Water. The fire and sky. In our elemental combat, you shall die." The combination of the incantation and the blood sacrifice fulfills the prophecy and finally kills the Red Queen.

After the victory Malachi holds a funeral for Erik, but watching in the background are two minions, and they release their ominous red cloud of magic.

== Cast ==
- Luke Goss as Malachi
- Sarah Douglas as the Red Queen, leader of the witches
- Ed Speleers as Jason, Malachi's best friend
- Andrew Pleavin as Erik, Jason's older brother, a great warrior
- MyAnna Buring as Jozefa, the Red Queen's daughter and enforcer
- Simon Thorp as Kramer, a witch hunter
- Lynne Verrall as Baba, an old woman from the village
- Ian Virgo as Hobart, headman of a neighbouring village
- Xiaofei Zhou as Darian (voiced by Ava Lyn Koh), leader of a group of brigands from Cathay
- Ian Reed as Castle Priest
- Jack Smith as Longchamps, one of Malachi's guards

== Production ==
Witchville was filmed in Yixian, China.

== Release ==
The film was released on DVD by Lionsgate Home Entertainment on July 5, 2011.

== Reception ==
Justin Felix of DVD Talk emphasized that this was "a SyFy production, and anyone at all familiar with the channel's weekend programming knows exactly what to expect here" and "worth watching once if you like this sort of thing". He said the film deviates little from the expected low-budget nonsense, but says the film "has a few interesting ideas and a fantastic supporting character in MyAnna Buring's Jozefa". The Radio Times gave it 2 out of a possible 5 stars.

== See also ==
- List of films about witchcraft
