= Sarah Douglas (actress) =

British actress (born 1952)

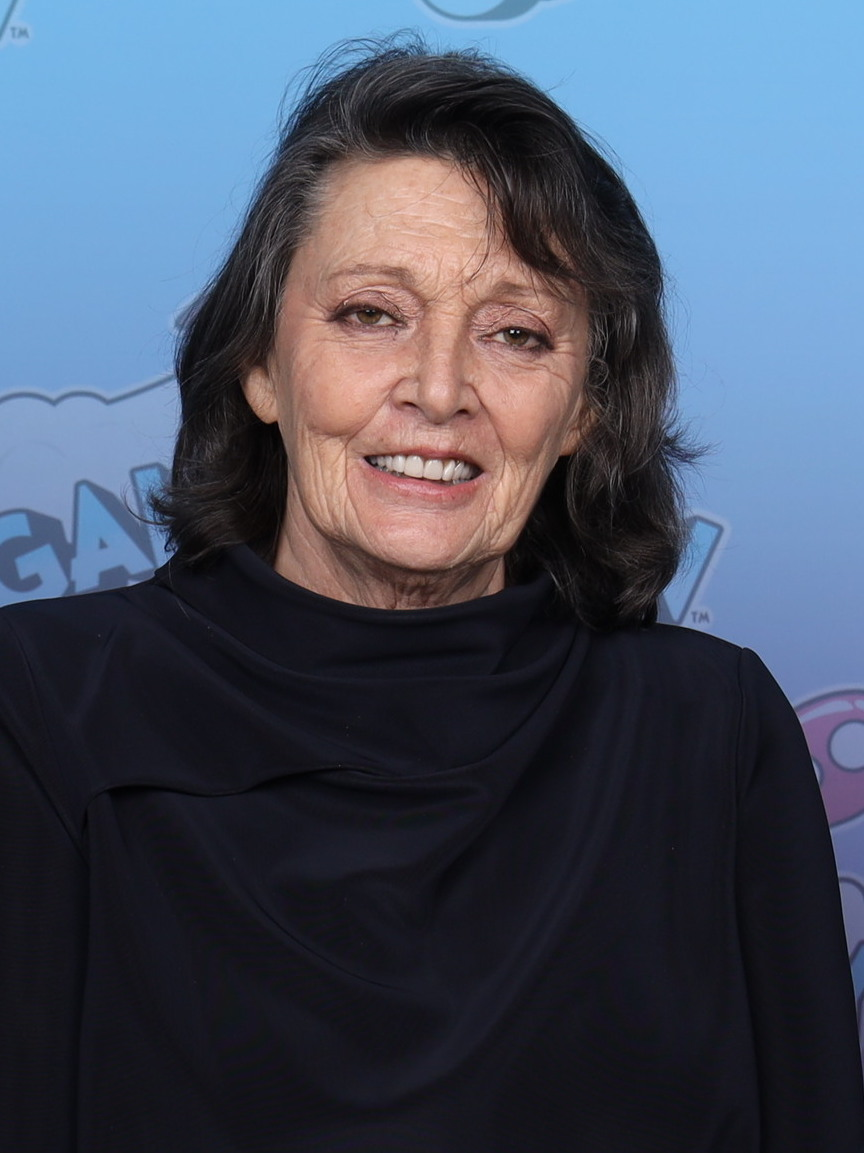
- Douglas at GalaxyCon Richmond in 2023
- Born: 12 December 1952 (age 73); Stratford-upon-Avon, Warwickshire, England
- Education: Rose Bruford College
- Occupation: Actress
- Years active: 1966–present
- Spouse: Richard LeParmentier (m. 1981; div. 1984)
- Website: sarah-douglas.com

Sarah Douglas (born 12 December 1952) is an English actress. She is known for her roles as Ursa in Superman (1978) and Superman II (1980), Queen Taramis in Conan the Destroyer (1984), Pamela Lynch in Falcon Crest (1983–85), and Jindah Kol Rozz in Supergirl (2018).

== Early life and career ==
Douglas was born in Stratford-upon-Avon, Warwickshire, the second daughter of Beryl (née Smith), a physiotherapist who often worked upon RSC actors, and Edward Douglas, a career member of the Royal Air Force. She attended Alcester Grammar School before training with the National Youth Theatre and the Rose Bruford College.

Eventually, Douglas's career took her in front of the camera with small appearances in the 1973 film The Final Programme (alternatively known as The Last Days of Man on Earth) and Rollerball in 1975. After this, she became known to British television audiences in the 1970s by appearing in The Howerd Confessions, the 1973 television edition of Dracula, The Inheritors, Space: 1999, and Return of the Saint, and appeared in the film The People That Time Forgot (1977) and the controversial film The Brute (1977), in which she played an abused wife.

After an intensive casting call in which she beat out over 600 actresses for the part, including Caroline Munro and Marilù Tolo, Douglas secured her first major feature film role as the supporting antagonist Ursa in Superman (1978) and Superman II (1980); her performance garnered critical acclaim and became her signature role. She then accepted the role of the main antagonist Queen Taramis opposite Arnold Schwarzenegger, Grace Jones and Olivia d'Abo in the sword-and-sorcery epic fantasy film Conan the Destroyer (1984).

Douglas also continued to appear on television, and was a series regular in the short-lived British sitcom Thundercloud in 1979. Throughout the 1980s, she went on to appear in a variety of guest roles in UK and US series such as The Professionals, Bergerac, Hotel, Magnum, P.I., Sledge Hammer! and Remington Steele. However, her most prominent television role was that of Pamela Lynch in the primetime soap opera Falcon Crest, which she played for two seasons from 1983 to 1985. She also played Pamela in the 1984 television miniseries V: The Final Battle and portrayed supporting characters in The Return of Swamp Thing (1989), Beastmaster 2: Through the Portal of Time (1991) and Return of the Living Dead 3 (1993) among others.

In the 1990s, she returned to science fiction, guest starring in Babylon 5 (in the 1994 episode "Deathwalker"), and in Stargate SG-1 (in the 1998 two-part episode "The Tok'ra"). She also voiced characters in episodes of several animated TV series, including Iron Man, The Real Adventures of Jonny Quest, Superman: The Animated Series, Heavy Gear: The Animated Series, and Batman Beyond.

In 2003, Douglas returned to the UK to appear in a nationwide tour of Hamlet playing alongside actress Emily Lloyd. The following year, she completed a run in London's West End in the play Roast Beef playing the role of Clytemnestra. Also in 2004, Douglas completed an audio commentary for the Special Edition DVD of Conan the Destroyer.

In 2006, she performed in the audio drama Sapphire and Steel: The Mystery of the Missing Hour alongside David Warner, and she was reunited with many of her Superman co-stars in Los Angeles as a new version of Superman II (known as Superman II: The Richard Donner Cut) was released with previously unseen footage. At the same time, a new Superman DVD boxset was released, featuring an interview with Douglas and her original screen test.

Douglas' later appearances included the television films Gryphon (2007), Witchville (2010) and Strippers vs Werewolves (2012), and she participated in the audio recordings for Stargate Atlantis. Additionally, Douglas completed work on a series of radio plays for the BBC and voiced Scar in Green Lantern: The Animated Series. After this, she returned to the London stage, appearing in The Hallowe'en Sessions at the Leicester Square Theatre from 29 October to 3 November 2012 to positive reviews. She has continued to appear on film, stage, television and radio, in addition to appearing in Supergirl (2018) continued the tradition of re-casting former Superman stars, and cast Douglas as Jindah Kol Rozz in the episode "Fort Rozz".. In 2017 Douglas appeared as Mrs. Averill in the Netflix production A Christmas Prince and its two subsequent sequels. In 2019, Douglas had a guest appearance on the show Holby City, playing the character Victoria Parker. Six years later in 2025, she made a guest appearance as Portia Frost on Shakespeare & Hathaway: Private Investigators.

== Personal life ==
From 1981 to 1984, Douglas was married to fellow actor Richard LeParmentier (d.2013).

== Filmography ==
=== Film ===
Year	Title	Role	Notes
1973	The Final Programme	Catherine	
1977	The Brute	Diane	
1977	The People That Time Forgot	Charly	
1978	Superman	Ursa	
1980	Superman II	Ursa	
1984	Conan the Destroyer	Queen Taramis	
1986	Solarbabies	Shandray	
1987	Steele Justice	Kay	
1988	Nightfall	Roa	
1989	The Return of Swamp Thing	Dr. Lana Zurrell	
1991	Dalí	Gala	
1991	Beastmaster 2: Through the Portal of Time	Lyranna	
1991	The Art of Dying	Sara	
1991	Puppet Master III: Toulon's Revenge	Elsa Toulon	Direct-to-video
1992	Meatballs 4	Monica Shavetts	
1993	Return of the Living Dead 3	Lieutenant Colonel Sinclair	
1993	Quest of the Delta Knights	Madam Maaydeed	Direct-to-video
1994	Mirror, Mirror 2: Raven Dance	Nicolette	
1995	Spitfire	Carla Davis	
1995	The Demolitionist	The Surgeon	
1995	Voodoo	Professor Conner	
1995	Monster Mash	Countess Natasha 'Nasty' Dracula	
1997	Asylum	Dr. Emily Hill	
1998	Hell Mountain	Daneeka	
1999	Changing Directions	Sarah Johnson	Short film
2007	Gryphon	Queen Cassandra of Delphi	
2011	Halloween: H33	Dr. Loomis	Short film
2012	Strippers vs Werewolves	Jeanette	
2016	Displacement	Dr. Miles	
2017	A Christmas Prince	Mrs. Averill	
2018	A Christmas Prince: The Royal Wedding	Mrs. Averill	
2019	A Christmas Prince: The Royal Baby	Mrs. Averill	

=== Television ===
Year	Title	Role	Notes
1973	ITV Sunday Night Theatre	Joyce Langland	Episode: "Harlequinade"
1973	Black and Blue	Beautiful Girl	Episode: "Secrets"
1974	Dracula	Dracula's Wife	Television film
1974	Justice	Jenny Deane	2 episodes
1974	The Inheritors	Jennie Garrett	TV series
1976	BBC2 Playhouse	Miss Radson	Episode: "The Mind Beyond: Meriel, the Ghost Girl"
1976	The Howerd Confessions	Lola	Episode: "1.6"
1976	Space: 1999	B	Episode: "The AB Chrysalis"
1977	Warship	Amanda	Episode: "Robertson Crusoe"
1977	Esther Waters	Miss Peggy	Episode: "1.1"
1977	Seven Faces of Women	Marianne	Episode: "She: Eye of the Beholder"
1978	Return of the Saint	Sheila Northcott	Episode: "The Arrangement"
1979	Room Service	Mrs. Martindale	Episode: "1.7"
1979	Thundercloud	Bella Harrington	TV series
1980	The Professionals	Dr. Kate Ross	Episode: "Wild Justice"
1981	Bergerac	Anne Beresford	Episode: "Last Chance for a Loser"
1983–1985	Falcon Crest	Pamela Lynch	51 episodes: recurring (season 3), main cast (season 4)
1984	V: The Final Battle	Pamela	TV miniseries
1985	Murder, She Wrote	Violet Weems	Episode: "Sing a Song of Murder"
1986	Magnum, P.I.	Isobel Dumout, Countess Jacklyn Fabre Dumout	Episode: "All Thieves on Deck"
1986	Hotel	Stella Falco	Episode: "Hearts Divided"
1986	The Wizard	Lady Whitehurst	Episode: "It Takes a Chimp"
1987	Remington Steele	Shannon Wayne	Episode: "Steele Hanging in There"
1987	Matlock	Barbara Sutcliffe	Episode: "The Therapist"
1987	Sledge Hammer!	Mrs. Emily Carstairs	Episode: "Play It Again Sledge"
1987	Eight Is Enough: A Family Reunion	Leona Stark	Television film
1989	A Fine Romance	Dr. Emma Gabor	Episode: "It's Just the Gypsy in My Soul"
1990	Father Dowling Mysteries	Mrs. Gibbons	Episode: "The Royal Mystery"
1990	Super Force	Dr. Verona	Episode: "The Crime Doctor"
1991	Tagget	Mrs. Sands	Television film
1993	Tarzán	Kiki Bluet	Episode: "Tarzan and the Fountain of Youth"
1993	Almost Home	Lady Harrington	Episode: "The Fox and the Hound"
1994	Babylon 5	Deathwalker, Jha'Dur	Episode: "Deathwalker"
1994	Iron Man	Alana Ulanova (voice)	Episode: "Enemy Within, Enemy Without"
1995	Gargoyles	Una (voice)	Episode: "M.I.A."
1996	The Stepford Husbands	Dr. Frances Borzage	Television film
1996	To the Ends of Time	Karnissa	Television film
1996	The Real Adventures of Jonny Quest	Mrs. Cadbury (voice)	Episode: "Village of the Doomed"
1997	L.A. Heat	Wilma	Episode: "Electra"
1998	Stargate SG-1	Yosuuf, Garshaw of Belote	Episode: "The Tok'ra"
1999	Superman: The Animated Series	Mala (voice)	Episode: "Absolute Power"
1999–2000	Batman Beyond	Donna Walker / Queen (voice)	2 episodes
2001	Heavy Gear: The Animated Series	Col. Magnilda Rykka (voice)	
2005	The Brief	Crown Court Judge	Episode: "Blame"
2008	Zorro: Generation Z	Gloria Sheffield	2 episodes
2008	Doctors	Stacy Morgan	Episode: "Hearts and Minds"
2010	Witchville	The Red Queen	Television film
2012–2013	Green Lantern: The Animated Series	Scar (voice)	4 episodes
2015	Emmerdale	Consultant	2 episodes
2018	Supergirl	Jindah Kol Roz	Episode: "Fort Rozz"
2019	Holby City	Victoria Parker	Episode: "Ex Marks The Spot"
2025	Shakespeare & Hathaway: Private Investigators	Portia Frost	Episode: "Daggers of the Mind"
