= Tahirah Sharif =

British actress

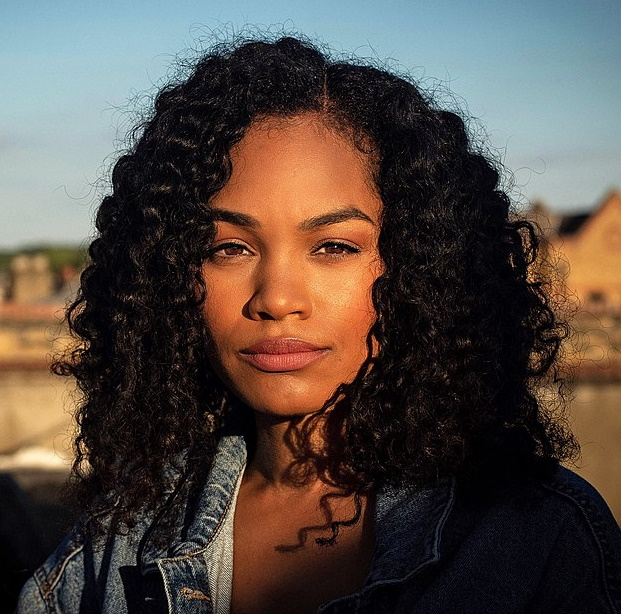
- Sharif in 2020
- Born: Tahirah Amandla Sharif; London, England
- Occupation: Actress
- Years active: 2010–present

Tahirah Amandla Sharif is a British actress noted mainly for her roles as student Carrie Norton in Waterloo Road in 2015, Rebecca Jessel in the Netflix horror anthology series The Haunting of Bly Manor in 2020, and PC Lizzie Adama in The Tower in 2021 for which she received a Supporting Actress BAFTA nomination.

== Acting education ==
Tahirah Amandla Sharif is a British actress from Brixton, South West London, England born to a Pakistani mother and Jamaican father. Sharif's first acting role was in a school play at the age of six. Aged 16, Sharif joined the Brit School for Performing Arts & Technology in Croydon, London. Later continuing her acting education attending evening classes at the Identity School of Acting in London.

== Career ==
One of Sharif's first roles was in Film 4 short See Me as the lead.

In 2012, Sharif appeared in each episode of the BBC drama, One Night as Madison as well as appearing in the second series of ITV drama Whitechapel as Chantal Essian. In the same year Sharif played Esther Adams in the stage production of Moon on a Rainbow Shawl at The National Theatre and as Dunyazade in the stage production of Arabian Nights at the Tricycle Theatre. Sharif then appeared in her first feature film, The Invisible Woman as Rosa, starring alongside Ralph Fiennes and Felicity Jones.

In 2013, Sharif was cast as the teenage daughter of Martin Ashford (Patrick Robinson), Ella in the BBC television series Casualty. Ella was billed as "mischievous, a true troublemaker and determined to cause trouble for Ash [father, Martin]". Sharif's first scenes aired on 4 May 2013 and final scenes over a year later, on 17 May 2014.

After Casualty, Sharif reprised her role as Esther Adams in the stage production of Moon on a Rainbow Shawl for its UK national tour.

Sharif starred in the final ten episodes of long-running school drama, Waterloo Road, as student Carrie Norton in 2015. Her storylines included the return of her brother, Guy Braxton (Regé-Jean Page) and her relationship with Lenny Brown (Joe Slater). Sharif went onto play Kile in sci fi short film Pulsar in 2015 alongside Jessie Buckley and David Gyasi. The same year, Sharif played Katie in Firebird at Hampstead Theatre. The play was so successful that it got transferred to west end theatre Trafalgar Studios in 2016.

In 2017, Sharif was cast as Melissa in A Christmas Prince, and its sequels A Christmas Prince: The Royal Wedding and A Christmas Prince: The Royal Baby released on Netflix in 2018 and 2019 respectively.

Sharif also starred as Rebecca Jessel in the Netflix horror anthology series The Haunting of Bly Manor, which was released in October 2020.

== Filmography ==
=== Film ===
Year	Film	Role	Notes
2010	Assessment	Rachel	Short film
2010	See Me	Alicia	Short film
2012	Stop	Nikki	Short film
2013	The Invisible Woman	Rosa	
2015	Pulsar	Kile	Short film
2017	A Christmas Prince	Melissa	
2018	Beautified	Belle	Short film
2018	A Christmas Prince: The Royal Wedding	Melissa	
2019	A Christmas Prince: The Royal Baby	Melissa	
2021	The Kindred	Sue	
2022	Escape the Field	Cameron	

=== Television ===
Year	Programme	Role	Notes
2011	Casualty	Shelley King	1 episode: Secrets and Lies
2011	Doctors	Aaliyah Clarke	1 episode
2012	One Night	Madison	Series regular
2012	Whitechapel	Chantal Essian	1 episode: series 3, episode 6
2013–2014	Casualty	Ella Ashford	Recurring role
2015	Waterloo Road	Carrie Norton	Series regular (10 episodes)
2020	The First Team	Elle	1 episode
2020	The Haunting of Bly Manor	Rebecca Jessel	Series regular (9 episodes)
2021-2024	The Tower	PC Lizzie Adama	Main Cast
2023	A Town Called Malice	Cindy Carter	Main role
2026	Fightland	Kim Harper	

=== Theatre ===
Year	Title	Role	Venue
2012	Crawling in the Dark	Amber	Almeida Theatre
2012	Moon on a Rainbow Shawl	Esther Adams	The National Theatre
2012	Arabian Nights	Dunyazade	Tricycle Theatre
2014	Moon on a Rainbow Shawl	Esther Adams	Various
2015	Firebird	Katie	Hampstead Theatre
2016	Firebird	Katie	Trafalgar Studios
2018	Orange Polar Bear	Sarah / Mother	National Theatre Company Korea / Birmingham Rep
