= Honor Kneafsey =

British actress

- Born: 2004 (age 21–22); Oxford, England
- Occupation: Actress
- Years active: 2011–present

Honor Kneafsey is a British actress. She has made numerous television, film and West End stage appearances.

Kneafsey is the daughter of Mark Kneafsey and Alison née Jones, who married in Oxford in England in 1998. She started her career as a child actress, featuring in such roles as June, the youngest child of historical figure George Mottershead, in the BBC1 drama Our Zoo (2014), and the young character Christine Gipping who works in, and later burns down, the eponymous The Bookshop (2017). She is also known for her voice role as Robyn Goodfellowe in Wolfwalkers (2020).

== Filmography ==
=== Film ===
Year	Title	Role	Notes
2012	Scrubber	Girl	
2014	Abducted	Lara Hollis	
2015	Miss You Already	Scarlett	
2017	Butterfly Kisses	Lilly	
2017	The Bookshop	Christine Gipping	
2017	Crooked House	Josephine Leonides	
2017	Slumber	Emily Morgan	
2017	A Christmas Prince	Princess Emily	
2018	A Christmas Prince: The Royal Wedding	Princess Emily	
2019	A Christmas Prince: The Royal Baby	Princess Emily	
2020	Legacy of Lies	Lisa	
2020	Wolfwalkers	Robyn Goodfellowe	Voice role
2023	Napoleon	Marie Antoinette Kid #1	

=== Television ===
Year	Title	Role	Notes
2011	How Not to Live Your Life	Little Samantha	Episode: "It's a Don-derful Life"
2012–2017	Sherlock	Little Girl / Girl on the plane	2 episodes
2014	Friday Night Dinner	Katie	Episode: "The Girlfriend"
2014	Our Zoo	June Mottershead	TV mini-series
2015	X Company	Annie	Episode: "Pilot"
2015	Black Work	Melly	TV mini-series
2016	Siblings	Lily	Episode: "Gregg and Lily"
2016–2017	Benidorm	Jodie Dawson	Regular role, 11 episodes (series 8–9)
2017	Babs	Barbara Ann Deeks	Television film
2018	Sick Note	Beth	Episode: "Frantisek Kotzwara"

=== Theatre ===
Year	Title	Role	Venue	Ref.
2022	The Trials	Ren	Donmar Warehouse	
2024	The Crucible	Betty Parris	Sheffield Theatres	

== Awards and nominations ==
Year	Award	Category	Nominated work	Result	Ref.
2020	Alliance of Women Film Journalists	Best Animated Female	Wolfwalkers	Nominated	
2020	Washington D.C. Area Film Critics Association Awards	Best Voice Performance	Wolfwalkers	Nominated	
2021	Critics' Choice Super Awards	Best Voice Actress in an Animated Movie	Wolfwalkers	Nominated	
2021	Hollywood Film Critics Association Awards	Best Animated or VFX Performance	Wolfwalkers	Nominated	
