= Bandwagon (film) =

1996 film by John Schultz

- Theatrical release poster
- Directed by: John Schultz
- Written by: John Schultz
- Produced by: Alyson Poole; John Schultz
- Starring: Lee Holmes; Kevin Corrigan; Matthew Hennessey; Steve Parlavecchio
- Cinematography: Shawn Maurer
- Edited by: John Pace
- Music by: Greg Kendall
- Distributed by: Cinepix; Lakeshore Entertainment
- Release dates: January 1996 (Sundance Film Festival); September 12, 1997 (United States)
- Running time: 103 minutes
- Country: United States
- Language: English
- Box office: $22,189

Bandwagon is a 1996 American film by writer/director John Schultz, starring Lee Holmes and Kevin Corrigan.

== Production ==
Writer/director John Schultz used to drum for independent band The Connells but left them early on to start a filmmaking career. Bandwagon was not only the first feature film for Schultz but for a lot of the crew members as well. Schultz said, "On the shoot, we didn't really realize what we were doing right and what we were doing wrong and a lot of the problems we found in the editing room." The film was made in 1993 in Schultz's hometown of Raleigh, North Carolina and took six weeks to complete.

Greg Kendall is a singer/guitarist who was hired to write the songs for the band in the film. He was introduced to Schultz by mutual friend Doug MacMillan who plays Linus Tate in the movie. He said, "They were to have good songs, but they had to be believable. They couldn't be too stupid and they couldn't be too ornate." Schultz supplied the titles to the songs and Kendall wrote and sang most of them. They were recorded at Fort Apache Studios in Cambridge, Massachusetts. Eight of his songs appear in the film and he also composed the score. Kendall likes that "there's nothing MTV about it [the film]. It's naive, some would say to a fault. I would say it's a strength."

== Reaction ==
The film debuted at the Sundance Film Festival in 1996. It was subsequently picked up by Lakeshore Entertainment, and as a result, is the first film to ever come out of that company.

== Home media availability ==
The film was released on VHS in 1998. In 2013, Amazon.com began offering a manufacture on demand DVD release of the film.
