= Theo Devaney =

English actor

- Born: 25 August 1984 (age 42); London, United Kingdom
- Education: Oxford School of Drama
- Occupation: Actor
- Years active: 2008–present

Theo Devaney (born 25 August 1984) is an English actor best known for his portrayal of Gavin MacLeod in Supernatural (2014-2017) and Simon in A Christmas Prince (2017), A Christmas Prince: The Royal Wedding (2018), A Christmas Prince: The Royal Baby (2019) and Sherlock Holmes in Moriarty the Patriot (2021). In 2011 for The Witcher 2: Assassins of Kings he is the voice of Aryan La Valette.

== Education ==
Born in London, Devaney graduated from a three-year Professional Acting training at the Oxford School of Drama in 2005.

== Filmography ==
=== Film ===
Year	Title	Role	Notes
2017	A Christmas Prince	Simon	
2018	A Christmas Prince: The Royal Wedding	Simon	
2019	Once Upon a Time in London	Stanley	
2019	A Christmas Prince: The Royal Baby	Simon	
2021	The Princess Switch 3: Romancing the Star	Simon	Cameo appearance
2022	Shin Ultraman	Zōffy	English dub

=== Television ===
Year	Title	Role	Notes
2009	Doctors	Adrian Miller	Episode: Surrender; As Theo Herdman
2014	Psych	Winston	Episode: Lock, Stock, Some Smoking Barrels and Burton Guster's Goblet of Fire
2017	Swerve	Officer Vincenzo	Episode: Rueben
2014-2017	Supernatural	Gavin Macleod	Recurring role; 2 episodes
2019	Emmerdale	Miles	Recurring role; 3 episodes
2021	Moriarty the Patriot	Sherlock Holmes	First anime role
