= A Christmas Prince: The Royal Baby =

2019 American Christmas romantic comedy film

- Official cover for the movie
- Directed by: John Schultz
- Written by: Nate Atkins
- Produced by: Amy Krell
- Starring: Rose McIver; Ben Lamb; Alice Krige; Honor Kneafsey; Sarah Douglas
- Cinematography: Viorel Sergovici
- Edited by: Marshall Harvey
- Music by: Zack Ryan
- Production company: MPCA
- Distributed by: Netflix
- Release date: December 5, 2019
- Running time: 85 minutes
- Country: United States
- Language: English

A Christmas Prince: The Royal Baby is a 2019 Christmas romantic comedy film directed by John Schultz from a screenplay by Nate Atkin, based on characters created by Karen Schaler. The film stars Rose McIver, Ben Lamb and Sarah Douglas. It is the third and final installment of the series, following A Christmas Prince and A Christmas Prince: The Royal Wedding.

The film once again follows Queen Amber and King Richard of Aldovia as they prepare to welcome their first child. However, when a priceless royal artifact is stolen from inside the palace, the couple must race against the clock to solve the mystery in order to save their family and kingdom.

The film was released on December 5, 2019, by Netflix.

== Plot ==
One year after the last film, King Richard and Queen Amber of Aldovia are preparing to welcome their first child. As their last official act of the year, Amber and Richard host the king and queen of Penglia to renew a sacred treaty. The royal family takes out the ancient scroll treaty to be signed every century in recognition of its first signing 600 years ago. It was a truce over a long-running war over the Silk Road.

Amber's New York friend Melissa has come, not only for the baby shower but also by invitation from Simon, Richard's cousin who few trust due to his attempt to claim the throne two years ago. Amber's father Rudy calls to confirm his imminent arrival and availability through the baby's early January due date.

Queen Ming and King Tai arrive on the 21st. At their arrival celebration, Simon discloses that the attaché to the Penglian royals Lynn was at Oxford with him. Melissa soon begins to feel uncomfortable with their connection. Amber breaches the idea to Ming that they sign the treaty, alongside their kings, but she is initially against changing the tradition.

Sahil, the party planner, arrives with Amber's NYC friend Andy. Having met at the wedding, when Andy lost his job at the magazine they joined forces and rebranded his wedding planning company. They were hired to throw the baby shower.

On the morning of the 22nd, the treaty is soon discovered to be missing, just as they start the signing ceremony. As a blizzard has just ended, they know that the treaty and whoever stole it are still in the palace. Amber and Richard task Simon and Emily with distracting the Penglians so they can locate the treaty.

Simon was able to distract the other royals only a short time before they wandered off. Meanwhile Emily and the former queen come across an ancient curse which threatens Amber and Richard's first born child. It kicks in if the peace treaty is not signed by midnight of the 24th.

In the early hours of the 23rd, Amber reads about a scandal surrounding the Silk Road Treaty. Prince Claude's young wife was rumored to have had an affair with the other and shortly thereafter the prince was found poisoned. So his family, the Devons, vowed vengeance.

Although they are snowed in, upon Rudy's suggestion, they go through with the baby shower as a distraction. Melissa sees Simon and Lynn sneaking off quietly together. Discovering they had been investigating the financials between their countries, and observing he is hiding something, she declares that Amber was right about him. She then shows her friend and Richard the printout. They ask her to go about as usual.

On the 24th, castle staff member Mr. Little insists everyone stay out of the palace while the police's search dog seeks the treaty. So, they all walk to the local Christmas market. When word comes of the failed search, Amber faints. Back at the palace, she goes into labor. When the obstetrician is delayed, Queen Ming offers to help as she regularly volunteers at a maternity hospital and is a mother of three.

Emily and her mother are tasked by Amber to seek the treaty in the dungeon, which Mr. Little claims to be haunted, so the girl is nervous. They get locked into a cell by a gust of wind, but inadvertently find the treaty. The queen mother pics the lock with a hairpin and they get the treaty upstairs with moments to spare. Amber reveals Mr. Little stole it, which he admits as he confirms it was to avenge an ancestor.

Simon had been working with Lynn to help with the financials between their countries. He had been secretive about an engagement ring, so he proposes on the spot. Then all four monarchs sign the treaty, as Amber finally convinces Ming to sign as well.

Amber and Richard's daughter is born soon after and named after Amber’s late mother, Ellerie.

== Cast ==
- Rose McIver as Queen Amber Eve Charlton (née Moore), Queen of Aldovia.
- Ben Lamb as King Richard Bevan Charlton, King of Aldovia
- Alice Krige as Queen Helena Charlton, Queen Mother of Aldovia
- Honor Kneafsey as Princess Emily Charlton, the king Richard’s younger sister
- Theo Devaney as Count Simon Duxbury, the king Richard’s cousin
- Tahirah Sharif as Melissa, one of Amber's closest friends and Simon's love interest
- Joel McVeagh as Andy, one of Amber’s closest friends
- Raj Bajaj as Sahil Mattu, a world-famous designer
- Sarah Douglas as Mrs. Averill, a palace advisor
- Richard Ashton as Mr. Little, a palace worker staff
- Andy Lucas as Mr. Louis Zabala, a palace worker
- Kevin Shen as King Tai, King of Penglia.
- Momo Yeung as Queen Ming, Queen of Penglia.
- Crystal Yu as Lynn, attaché to the King and Queen of Penglia
- Madra Ihegborow as Dr Magoro, the queen’s ob/gyn
- John Guerrasio as Earl Rudy Moore, Earl of Aldovia and Amber's father
- Billy Angel as Tom Quill, Emily's boyfriend

== Production ==
=== Filming ===
Filming took place between March 2019 and June 2019 with the filming once again taking place in Romania.

== Release ==
It was released on December 5, 2019 by Netflix.

== Reception ==
As of October 2021, 36% of the 11 reviews compiled on Rotten Tomatoes are positive, with an average rating of 3.8/10.

== See also ==
- List of Christmas films
