= Ben Lamb (actor) =

English actor (b.1989)

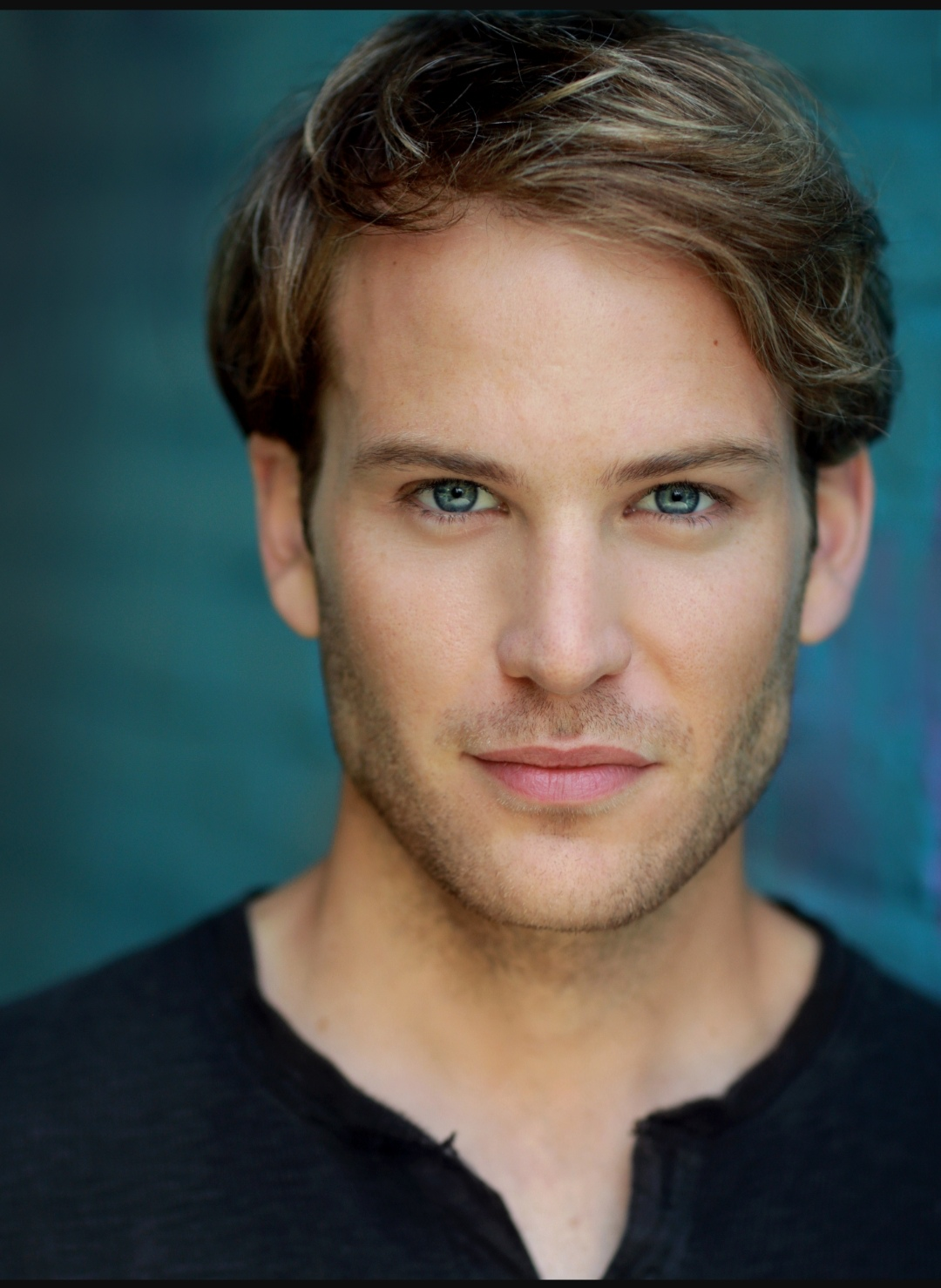
- Born: Benjamin Lamb; 24 January 1989 (age 37); Exeter, Devon, England
- Education: Royal Academy of Dramatic Art
- Occupation: Actor
- Years active: 2011–present
- Spouse: Julia Macfarlane (m. 2024)

Benjamin Lamb (born 24 January 1989) is an English actor, best known for his portrayal of Anthony Rivers in The White Queen, Edward in Divergent, Owen Case in Now You See Me 2, and King Richard in A Christmas Prince, A Christmas Prince: The Royal Wedding and A Christmas Prince: The Royal Baby.

== Education ==
Born in Exeter, Devon, Lamb was educated at Dragon School in Oxford, and Eton College in Berkshire, where he was a music scholar.

== Career ==
After graduating RADA in 2010, Lamb started his professional career in opera before joining the National Youth Theatre and performed in 20 Cigarettes.

In 2012, Lamb appeared as Percy Bysshe Shelley in Helen Edmundson's play Mary Shelley. In 2013, he appeared as John Willoughby in Edmundson's adaptation of Sense and Sensibility on BBC Radio 4.

In 2013 he starred as Anthony in The White Queen and, in 2014, as Edward in Divergent.

Alongside his film career, he has performed in theatre, playing Lorenzo in The Merchant of Venice at Shakespeare's Globe, alongside Jonathan Pryce, and Malcolm in the Young Vic's Macbeth.

In 2017, he was cast as the title role in Netflix's A Christmas Prince and in the upcoming The Warrior Queen of Jhansi. Ben reprised his role as King Richard in the sequels, A Christmas Prince: The Royal Wedding and A Christmas Prince: The Royal Baby.

In 2023 he was cast as the Duke of Buckingham in the Julian Fellowes drama The Gilded Age.

== Filmography ==
=== Film ===
Year	Title	Role	Notes
2011	Il maestro	Clarinetist	Short
2014	Divergent	Edward	
2016	Blood Orange	Lucas	
2016	Now You See Me 2	Owen Case	
2017	A Christmas Prince	Prince Richard Bevan Charlton	
2018	A Christmas Prince: The Royal Wedding	King Richard Bevan Charlton	
2019	A Christmas Prince: The Royal Baby	King Richard Bevan Charlton	
2019	The Warrior Queen of Jhansi	Major Robert Ellis	
2020	The Princess Switch: Switched Again	King Richard Bevan Charlton	Cameo
2021	End of Term	Scott	
2022	Ledge	Joshua	

=== Television ===
Year	Title	Role	Notes
2012	Silk	Posh Male Candidate	Episode: "2.4"
2013	The White Queen	Anthony Woodville, 2nd Earl Rivers	TV miniseries
2014	If I Don't Come Home: Letters from D-Day	Alastair Bannerman	TV film
2016	The Increasingly Poor Decisions of Todd Margaret	Tim Dempsey	Episode: "Todd Margaret Part 2"
2016	Midsomer Murders	Aiden McCordell	Episode: "Breaking the Chain"
2017	Victoria	Capt. Forbes	Episode: "Comfort and Joy"
2018	Knightfall	Brother Dominic	Episodes: "And Certainly Not the Cripple", "IV", "Fiat!"
2018	The Alienist	Jack Astor	Episode: "Castle in the Sky"
2019	Endeavour	Rupert Creswell	Episode: "Confection"
2020	Father Brown	Harvey St. Gardner	Episode: "The Fall of the House of St. Gardner"
2023-Present	The Gilded Age	Hector Vere, 5th Duke of Buckingham	Season 2, Season 3
