= A Christmas Prince: The Royal Wedding =

- Film poster
- Directed by: John Schultz
- Written by: Nathan Atkins
- Based on: Characters by Karen Schaler
- Produced by: Amy Krell
- Starring: Rose McIver; Ben Lamb; Alice Krige; Sarah Douglas; Tahirah Sharif
- Cinematography: Viorel Sergovici
- Edited by: Marshall Harvey
- Music by: Zack Ryan
- Production company: MPCA
- Distributed by: Netflix
- Release date: November 30, 2018
- Running time: 92 minutes
- Country: United States
- Language: English

A Christmas Prince: The Royal Wedding is a 2018 Christmas romantic comedy film directed by John Schultz and written by Nathan Atkins, based on characters created by Karen Schaler. The film stars Rose McIver, Ben Lamb, Sarah Douglas, Alice Krige and Tahirah Sharif. It is a sequel to A Christmas Prince and was followed by A Christmas Prince: The Royal Baby.

It was released on November 30, 2018, by Netflix.

== Plot ==
One year after the events of the first film, Amber and Richard are still happily engaged. The news media company she worked for went out of business, so her friends are unemployed. At Christmastime, Amber and her father Rudy travel to Aldovia to plan her wedding. She continues to blog about royal life with Richard.

Amber becomes overwhelmed with the dictatorial traditions of royal protocol and lack of control over her own wedding, which is controlled by the flamboyant designer Sahil and Mrs. Averill. Meanwhile, Richard struggles with the failing implementation of his Aldovian economic revitalization program, the New Aldovia initiative. It is mysteriously hemorrhaging money from the monarchy as unemployment and low wages afflict the increasingly discontent populace.

To assist in the economic efforts, Queen Helena brings in Lord Leopold to assist Richard, as he had been planning aid efforts with Richard's late father. Meanwhile, Simon, impoverished due to his divorce from Sophia, also returns to beg to be brought back into the palace; a distrustful Richard reluctantly accepts, as Simon is family.

Amber and Richard's relationship grows strained as Richard becomes increasingly distracted with royal demands, and she clashes with Mrs. Averill's strict guidelines. After Princess Emily's play is cancelled due to a strike by governmental workers, Amber hosts the play at the palace. While the move was well-received, she becomes furious upon discovering Mrs. Averill took down posts from her blog about the event for their informality. Amber is further upset when Sahil and Mrs. Averill demand she remove her locket (containing her late mother's photo) for a royal portrait.

After receiving a bitter Christmas card from an unemployed worker, Amber investigates the royal finances with her friends, who have come to celebrate her wedding. She learns that the New Aldovia initiative has been failing because a group of new companies has been outbidding local workers and taking the money out of the country.

During a paparazzi ambush, Amber is saved by Simon, who wants to help investigate the economic issue. With Emily's help, the group hacks into a site and discover the shell companies are owned by the association Glockenspiel Consortium. Mrs. Averill confronts Richard and Amber over paparazzi photos of Amber at a bar while investigating, so she admits to the sleuthing.

When Richard fails to defend Amber against Mrs. Averill, she storms out. He admits his failings as a fiancé to Emily, and after finding Amber, they reconcile. Then, Helena gives them the blessing to have the ceremony she wants.

During a royal celebration, the group reveals that Glockenspiel Consortium is owned by Leopold, who is accosted and thrown into the palace dungeon. Richard gives a Christmas address that promises holiday bonuses to all Aldovian workers, and the populace celebrates. He and Amber finally marry in a ceremony that blends tradition with modernity, and everyone celebrates as the two leave to share a private kiss.

== Cast ==
- Rose McIver as Amber Eve Moore
- Ben Lamb as King Richard Bevan Charlton
- Alice Krige as Queen Helena Charlton, the Queen Mother
- Honor Kneafsey as Princess Emily Charlton
- Sarah Douglas as Mrs. Averill
- Theo Devaney as Count Simon Duxbury
- John Guerrasio (replacing Daniel Fathers) as Rudy Moore
- Andy Lucas as Mr. Louis Zabala
- Simon Dutton as Lord Leopold Plumtree
- Katarina Čas as Chef Ivana Krasnov
- Richard Ashton as Mr. Little
- Raj Bajaj as Sahil Mattu
- Tahirah Sharif as Melissa
- Joel McVeagh as Andy
- Billy Angel as Tom Quill
- Tom Knight as Prime Minister Denzil
- David Broughton Davies as Ernest Mason
- Emma Louise Saunders as Lady Sofia

== Production ==
In May 2018, it was reported that John Schultz would direct a sequel to the 2017 film A Christmas Prince which would be distributed by Netflix. Alongside the initial announcement, it was confirmed that Rose McIver, Ben Lamb, and Alice Krige would reprise their roles in the film. Principal photography began in May 2018 in Romania.

== Release ==
It was released on November 30, 2018, by Netflix.

== Reception ==
On review aggregator website Rotten Tomatoes, the film holds an approval rating of 50% based on 18 reviews, and an average rating of 4.6/10.

== Sequel ==
A third film, titled A Christmas Prince: The Royal Baby was announced by Netflix in March 2019. The sequel premiered on December 5, 2019.

== See also ==
- List of Christmas films
