= John Schultz (director) =

American filmmaker

John Joseph Schultz
- Born: May 12, 1963 (age 63); New York, United States
- Occupations: Director, screenwriter, producer, former musician

John Schultz is an American film director, screenwriter, producer and former musician.

== Biography ==
Schultz started his writing and directing career with the documentary The Making of 'Jurassic Park' (1995) but has since directed such films as Bandwagon, Drive Me Crazy, Like Mike, When Zachary Beaver Came to Town, The Honeymooners, Aliens in the Attic, Judy Moody and the Not Bummer Summer, A Christmas Prince: The Royal Wedding, and Adventures in Babysitting, a Disney Channel Original Movie.

Prior to his career in film, Schultz was the original drummer of The Connells, a Raleigh, North Carolina, band. He left in 1985.
