= 20 Cigarettes (play) =

2007 play by Marcy Kahan

- Written by: Marcy Kahan
- Characters: Oscar Klavier

Premiere
- Date: 2007
- Place: Soho Theatre

20 Cigarettes is a play and radio play written by Marcy Kahan.

It was performed between 15 August and 30 August 2007 at the Soho Theatre for the National Youth Theatre. The theatre developed the play in response to the introduction of the smoking ban in England, asking how smoking forms part of our identity.

== Synopsis ==
Oscar Klavier has been a smoker since his mother introduced him to cigarettes as a schoolboy. As a middle-aged man, the women he loves gives him an ultimatum: she will only marry him if he gives up smoking. To help him quit, a therapist encourages him to discuss the 20 most emotionally important cigarettes of his life.

== Production history ==
Kahan was commissioned by the BBC to write the radio play, and then in 2007 to rewrite the play for the stage by the National Youth Theatre. The production was directed by Toby Frow.

Following the introduction of the smoking ban, the theatre had to ask special permission for the actors to light up on stage.

== Radio play ==
The radio play was broadcast on BBC Radio 7 on 9 January 2008, starting Anton Lesser and Stephen Mangan.

== Cast ==
The cast of the 2007 National Youth Theatre production was (in alphabetical order):

- Helen Beaumont
- Jesse Blidner
- Simon Brown
- Cassie Clare
- James Cooper
- Helen Duff
- Simon Dutton
- Josh Hart
- Joan Iyiola
- Valene Kane
- Harry Melling
- James Musgrave
- Ben Lamb
- Rebecca Loudon
- Sarah Price
- Emmet Ward
- Alex Warren
