= Rose McIver =

New Zealand actress (born 1988)

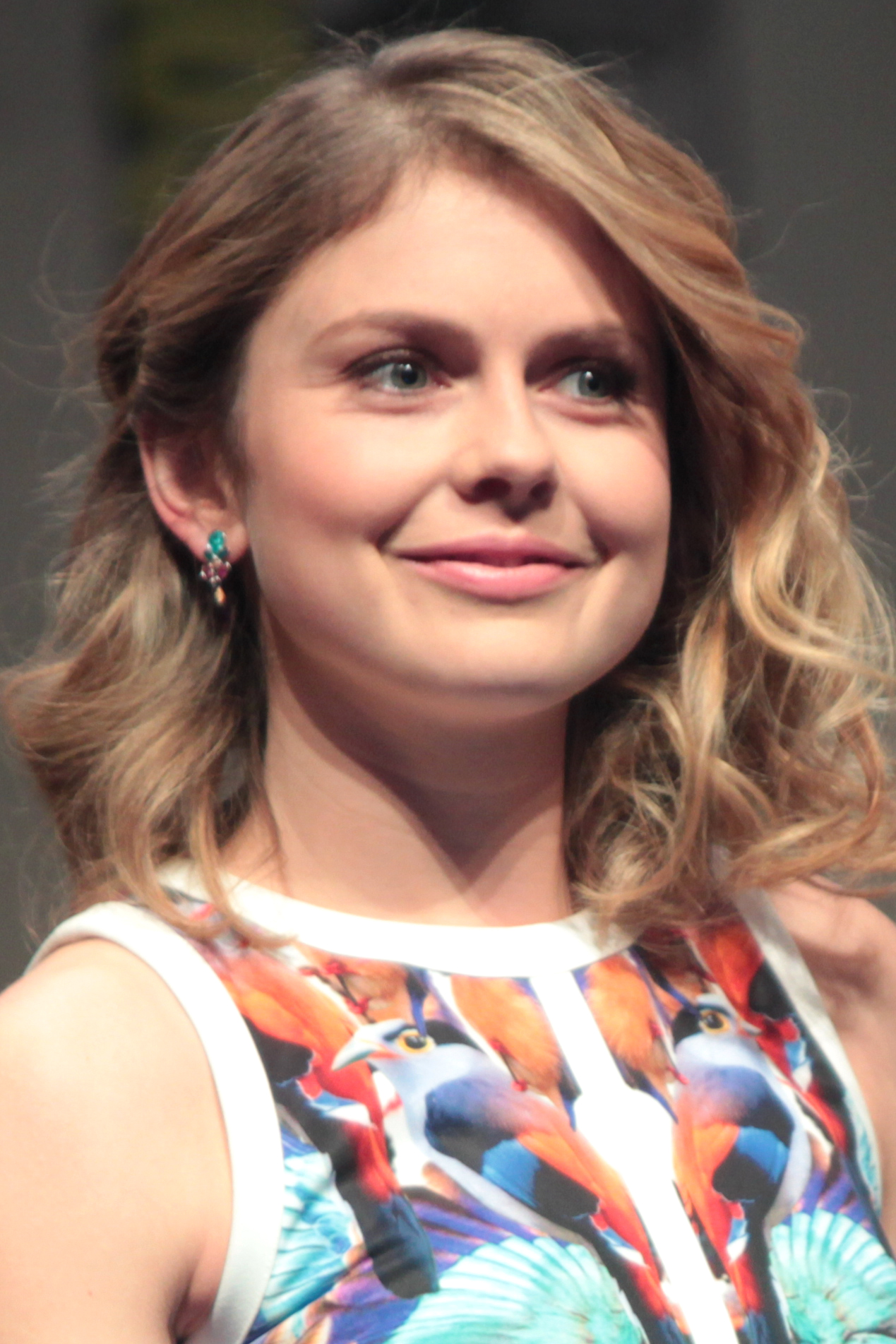
- McIver at WonderCon in April 2015
- Born: Frances Rose McIver; 10 October 1988 (age 38); Auckland, New Zealand
- Education: Avondale College
- Occupation: Actress
- Years active: 1991–present
- Spouse: George Byrne (m. 2023)
- Children: 2
- Relatives: Paul McIver (brother)

Frances Rose McIver (born 10 October 1988) is a New Zealand actress. She portrays Samantha Arondekar in the CBS supernatural sitcom Ghosts (2021–present), Olivia "Liv" Moore in The CW supernatural comedy-drama series iZombie (2015–2019), Summer Landsdown the Yellow Ranger in Power Rangers RPM (2009), and Amber Moore in the romantic comedy film A Christmas Prince (2017) and its two sequels, The Royal Wedding (2018) and The Royal Baby (2019).

McIver began her career with guest appearances in New Zealand–based series, such as Xena: Warrior Princess, Hercules: The Legendary Journeys and Legend of the Seeker. She had recurring roles in the Showtime period drama series Masters of Sex (2013–14) and the ABC fantasy adventure drama series Once Upon a Time (2013–2017).

McIver made her film debut in the period drama The Piano (1993). Since then, she has starred in the drama The Lovely Bones (2009), the horror comedy Predicament (2010), the sports drama Blinder (2013), the romance drama Petals on the Wind (2014), and the musical drama Daffodils (2019).

== Early life ==
McIver was born in Auckland and was raised in Titirangi by her father, John George Whitfield "Mac" McIver (b. 1951), a photographer, and her mother, Ann "Annie" (née Coney), an artist. Her parents still reside in the house in which she grew up. She has an older brother, Paul McIver, who is a musician and former actor. She studied ballet and jazz dance until she was 13.

McIver attended Avondale College and was a prefect in her final year. She graduated in 2006. She studied at the University of Auckland, and majored in Psychology and Linguistics, but did not complete her degree. Between acting jobs, she was a babysitter and worked part-time importing bananas with Fair Trade. She took part in their "All Good Bananas" promotion, as the voice of the listener's conscience.

== Career ==
At the age of two, McIver began appearing in commercials; at three, she received the role of an angel in the film The Piano.

McIver has worked for New Zealand television, from fantasy-based series such as Maddigan's Quest to dramas such as Rude Awakenings. She has starred in television films such as the Hercules film series and Maiden Voyage, as well as two Disney Channel films: Eddie's Million Dollar Cook-Off in 2003 and Johnny Kapahala: Back on Board in 2007, which is the sequel to the 1999 film Johnny Tsunami. From March to December 2009, she portrayed Summer Landsdown / Ranger Yellow in the television series Power Rangers RPM for 32 episodes. She also had a role in the comedy series Super City, playing cheerleader Candice. In 2011, McIver appeared in the television film Tangiwai: A Love Story, based on the 1953 Tangiwai rail disaster. In the film, she played Nerissa Love, the fiancée of New Zealand cricketer Bob Blair and one of the victims of the disaster.

Her further TV roles were as the lead character in MTV's unsold pilot Cassandra French's Finishing School for Boys, based on the book by Eric Garcia and produced by Garcia and Krysten Ritter, in Showtime's Masters of Sex, based on the book Masters of Sex: The Life and Times of William Masters and Virginia Johnson, the Couple Who Taught America How to Love by Thomas Maier, as Tinker Bell for a multi-episode story arc on the series Once Upon a Time, and as adult Cathy Dollanganger in the Lifetime television film Petals on the Wind, adapted from the book by V. C. Andrews.

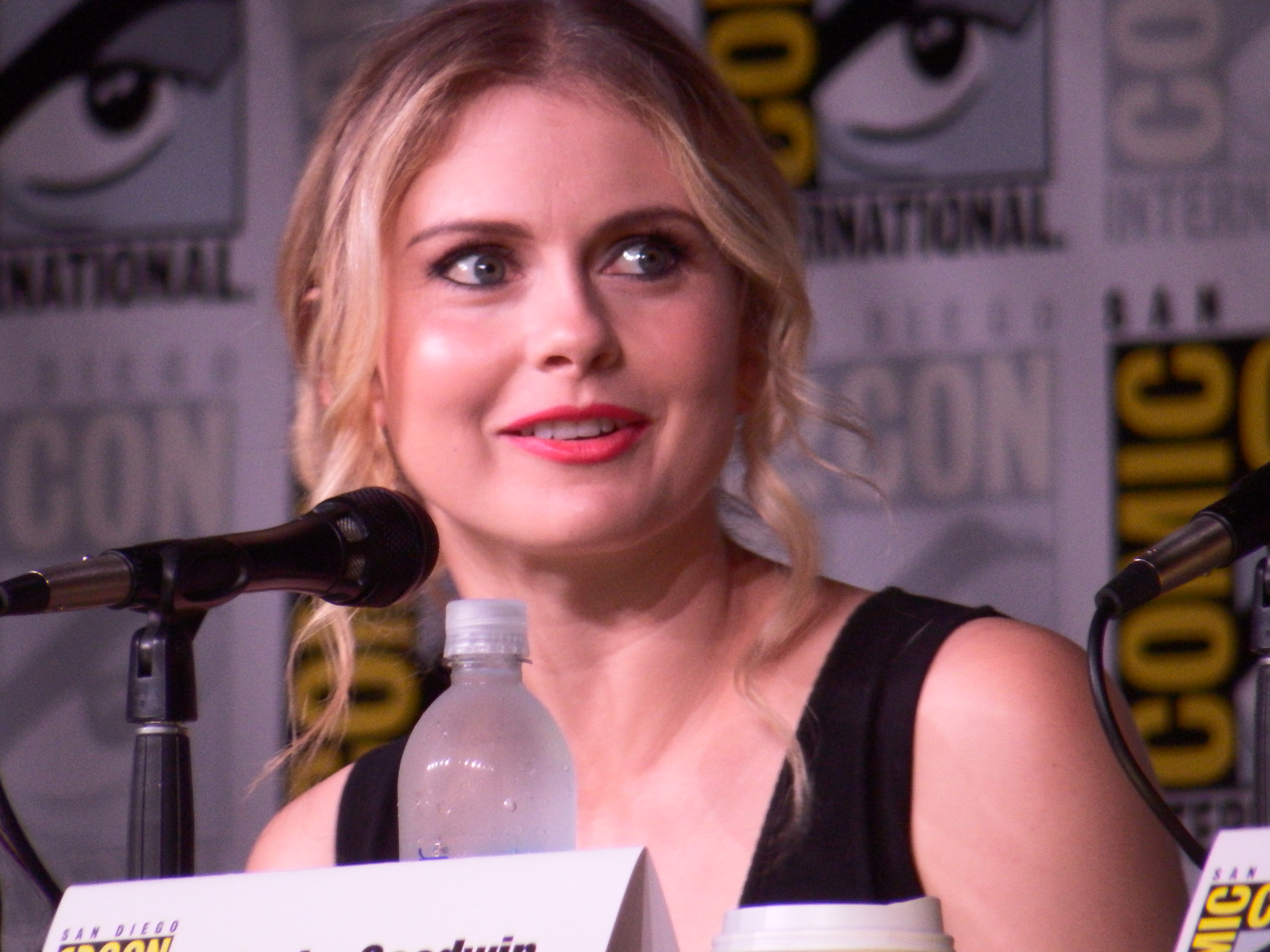
McIver on the iZombie panel at San Diego Comic-Con in 2016

In March 2015, McIver starred in The CW's series iZombie as Olivia "Liv" Moore. The series ended on 1 August 2019 after five seasons.

McIver appeared in Peter Jackson's film adaptation of The Lovely Bones, which received its U.S. release on 11 December 2009. In the film, she played Lindsey Salmon, the younger sister of the main character. From there she appeared in the film Predicament, based on the novel by Ronald Hugh Morrieson, which was released in New Zealand and Australia on 26 August 2010. She put her studies at the University of Auckland on hold, and traveled to Los Angeles for "a couple of top-secret projects". She was cast opposite Chris Lowell in the indie film Light Years, and in Australian rules football film, Blinder, which began filming in Torquay on 20 February 2012, before moving to Boston. McIver was cast in the musical feature, Daffodils. Filming began February 2018 in Wellington, Waikato, and Wairarapa, and was released in New Zealand and Australia in 2019.

In March 2017, it was reported that McIver was in Romania, filming A Christmas Prince for Netflix which was released 17 November 2017. She reprised her role as Amber Moore in the 2018 sequel film A Christmas Prince: The Royal Wedding and the 2019 threequel A Christmas Prince: The Royal Baby.

In October 2021, McIver began starring in the CBS sitcom Ghosts as Samantha "Sam" Arondekar, one of the leads.

== Personal life ==
McIver has been an ambassador for the airline Emirates. She enjoys writing and is inspired by the works of John Steinbeck, Wally Lamb and Franz Kafka. She also enjoys crossword puzzles and Sudoku.

On 2 January 2023, McIver eloped with Australian artist George Byrne in Santa Barbara, California, after six years of dating. Through their marriage, she is the sister-in-law of actress Rose Byrne. The couple had a daughter in 2024, and a second child in 2026.

== Filmography ==
=== Film ===
Year	Title	Role	Notes
1993	The Piano	Angel	
1997	Topless Women Talk About Their Lives	Sally	
1998	Flying	Josie	Short film
2001	Ozzie	Caitlin	
2002	Toy Love	Lucy	
2007	Knickers	Emily	Short film
2008	So Fresh & So Keen	Sally Poste	Short film
2009	The Lovely Bones	Lindsey Salmon	
2010	Predicament	Maybelle Zimmerman	
2010	Dangerous Ride	Renee	Short film
2012	The Dinner Party	Heather "Rose"	Short film
2013	Blinder	Sammy Walton	
2013	Brightest Star	Charlotte Cates	
2014	Petals on the Wind	Cathy Dollanganger	
2015	Warning Labels	Jessie	Short film
2015	Coward	Ophelia	Short film
2015	Mattresside	Sue	Short film
2015	Queen of Carthage	Jane	Voice
2015	The Answers	Paige	Short film
2017	A Christmas Prince	Amber Moore	
2018	A Christmas Prince: The Royal Wedding	Amber Moore	
2018	Brampton's Own	Rachel Kinley	
2019	Daffodils	Rose	
2019	A Christmas Prince: The Royal Baby	Queen Amber Moore	
2020	The Princess Switch: Switched Again	Queen Amber Moore	Cameo
2022	Next Exit	Heather	

=== Television ===
Year	Title	Role	Notes
1992	Shortland Street	Holly	
1994	Hercules and the Amazon Women	Girl (Hydra)	Television film
1994	Hercules in the Underworld	Ilea	Television film
1994	Hercules in the Maze of the Minotaur	Ilea	Television film
1995, 1997	Hercules: The Legendary Journeys	Ilea	2 episodes
1995	Riding High	Billy	Unknown episodes
1996	City Life	Sophie	Unknown episodes
1999	Xena: Warrior Princess	Daphne / Xena	Episode: "Little Problems"
2002	Murder in Greenwich	Sheila McGuire	Television film
2002	Mercy Peak	Gwyneth Couch	Episode: "Cruel to Be Kind"
2003	P.E.T. Detectives	Genevieve	Episode: "Play It Again, Evan"
2003	Eddie's Million Dollar Cook-Off	Hannah	Television film
2004	Maiden Voyage	Jenny	Television film
2006	Maddigan's Quest	Garland	Main role
2007	Rude Awakenings	Constance Short	Main role
2007	Johnny Kapahala: Back on Board	Val	Television film
2009	Legend of the Seeker	Alice	Episode: "Reckoning"
2009	Power Rangers RPM	Summer Landsdown / Ranger Yellow	Main role
2011	Tangiwai: A Love Story	Nerissa Love	Television film
2011	Super City	Candice	Main role
2012	CSI: Crime Scene Investigation	Bridget Byron	Episode: "Tressed to Kill"
2012	Cassandra French's Finishing School for Boys	Cassandra French	Unsold television pilot
2013–2014	Masters of Sex	Vivian Scully	8 episodes
2013–2014, 2017	Once Upon a Time	Tinker Bell	9 episodes
2014	Petals on the Wind	Adult Cathy Dollanganger	Television film
2014	Play It Again, Dick	Skank with Attitude	7 episodes
2015–2019	iZombie	Olivia "Liv" Moore	Main role
2017	A Bunch of Dicks	Johnny	Funny or Die short
2017	DreamWorks Dragons	Atali	Voice; 3 episodes
2018	I'm Sorry	Elizabeth	Episode: "The Small of My Back"
2020–2022	Woke	Adrienne	Main role
2021–present	Ghosts	Samantha "Sam" Arondekar	Main role, directed "Ghostfellas" and "St. Hetty's Day 2: The Help"
2021	Unwanted	Kate / Emily	

=== Video games ===
Year	Title	Role	Notes
2017	Access Code	Eve	Voice; Google Daydream

=== Music videos ===
Year	Title	Artist	Notes
2015	"Demon Days (Do It All Again)"	Wild Wild Horses	
2015	"Ordinary Life"	Wild Wild Horses	
2016	"Heartlines"	Broods	

=== Other works ===
Year	Title	Notes
2013	Blood Punch	Producer
2019	Nice Ride	Director and writer

== Theatre ==
Year	Title	Role	Venue
2003	Arcadia	Thomasina Coverly	Titirangi Theatre, Auckland
2008	Blood Brothers	Various	Peach Theatre Company, Auckland
2010	That Face	Izzy	Silo Theatre Company, Auckland
2019	Key Largo	Nora D'Alcala	Geffen Playhouse, Los Angeles

== Awards and nominations ==
Year	Association	Category	Work	Result	Ref.
2002	TV Guide NZ Television Awards	Best Juvenile Actor/Actress	Xena Warrior Princess	Won	
2007	Air New Zealand Screen Awards	Best Performance by an Actress	Maddigan's Quest	Nominated	
2010	Visa Entertainment Screen Awards	Best NZ Actress	The Lovely Bones	Won	
2012	Monte Carlo Film Festival	Outstanding Actress	Tangiwai	Nominated	
2017	Teen Choice Awards	Choice Comedy TV Actress	iZombie	Nominated	
2018	Teen Choice Awards	Choice Sci-Fi/Fantasy Actress	iZombie	Nominated	
2019	Teen Choice Awards	Choice Summer TV Actress	iZombie	Nominated	
2022	Hollywood Critics Association TV Awards	Best Actress in a Broadcast Network or Cable Series, Comedy	Ghosts	Nominated	
2022	Saturn Awards	Best Actress in a Network or Cable Television Series	Ghosts	Nominated	
2026	Critics' Choice Television Awards	Best Actress in a Comedy Series	Ghosts	Nominated	
