= Time of Death =

2013 American documentary television series

Time of Death is a 2013 American documentary television series. It airs on the premium cable station Showtime. The series follows the lives and deaths of eight individuals and their families. It features Nicole "Little" Lencioni, an American music artist and LGBT activist.

== Reception ==
Los Angeles Times television critic Mary McNamara wrote, "Time of Death is so determined to celebrate the power of a 'good' death that it often tidies away the very things that makes bedside vigils so inspiring. The grimmer realities of the dying body are not dealt with — there isn't an adult diaper in sight — and with the exception of Maria, no voice is raised except in song."

The Washington Post's Hank Stuever praised the series, writing that it "bears the dignified, documentary-style traits that reality TV had in its earliest days: It is desperately interested in observing people up-close, as they are, and will not turn away when things get too real. It has a deep well of empathy that is unclouded by saccharine attempts at sympathy." Joanne Ostrow of The Denver Post stated, "The camera is discreet, cutting away at the very end, giving privacy when taste requires. The families involved are brave in ways not required of ordinary 'reality TV' subjects. Even when they appear to be speaking for the camera, the situations are not manipulated. The impact is quite powerful."
