= Pumpkinhead =

Pumpkinhead or Punkinhead may refer to:

== Fictional characters ==
- Jack Pumpkinhead, from Oz book series by L. Frank Baum
  - Jack Pumpkinhead of Oz, 1929 book, 23rd in Oz book series by L. Frank Baum
- Lord Pumpkin, a Malibu Comics character sometimes incorrectly referred to as Pumpkinhead
- Mervyn Pumpkinhead from The Sandman comics by Neil Gaiman
- Punkinhead, a toy bear created by the Eaton's department store chain in Canada in 1947
- Punkinhead, in the comic Tiger

== Film ==
- Pumpkinhead (film series), a 1988 horror film and its three sequels:
  - Pumpkinhead (film) (1988)
  - Pumpkinhead II: Blood Wings (1994)
  - Pumpkinhead: Ashes to Ashes (2006)
  - Pumpkinhead: Blood Feud (2007)

== Music ==
- "Pumpkinhead", a song by the Self from their album Feels Like Breakin' Shit
- "Pumpkinhead", a song by the Misfits from their album Famous Monsters
- Pumpkinhead (band), a 1990s band from New Zealand, signed by Wildside Records
- Pumpkinhead (rapper), a hip hop music artist
- PunkinHed, a 2007 EP by southern rap artist Boondox

== See also ==
- "The Ballad of Peter Pumpkinhead", a song by XTC from their album Nonsuch
- Zuccone ("The Pumpkin Head"), a 15th-century sculpture by Italian Renaissance artist Donatello
