= Pumpkinhead (film series) =

American supernatural horror film series

- Original work: Pumpkinhead by Ed Justin
- Owner: Motion Picture Corporation of America
- Years: 1988–present

Films and television
- Film(s): Pumpkinhead (1988)
- Television film(s): Pumpkinhead: Ashes to Ashes (2006); Pumpkinhead: Blood Feud (2007)
- Direct-to-video: Pumpkinhead II: Blood Wings (1994)

Games
- Video game(s): Bloodwings: Pumpkinhead's Revenge

Pumpkinhead is an American supernatural horror film series that began in 1988. Originally inspired by a poem by Ed Justin, the series centers on the eponymous demon who attacks whomever it is summoned to destroy.

== Films ==
Film	U.S. release date	Director(s)	Screenwriter(s)	Story by	Producer(s)
Pumpkinhead	October 14, 1988	Stan Winston	Gary Gerani & Mark Patrick Carducci	Stan Winston, Richard C. Weinman & Mark Patrick Carducci	Bill Blake
Pumpkinhead II: Blood Wings	October 19, 1994	Jeff Burr	Ivan Chachornia & Constantine Chachornia		Brad Krevoy
Pumpkinhead: Ashes to Ashes	October 28, 2006	Jake West	Jake West & Barbara Werner		Brad Krevoy, Donald Kushner & Pierre Spengler
Pumpkinhead: Blood Feud	February 10, 2007	Michael Hurst	Michael Hurst		Brad Krevoy, Donald Kushner & Pierre Spengler

=== Pumpkinhead (1988) ===
Inspired by a poem by Ed Justin, the original film was released to theaters on October 14, 1988 and grossed over $4.3 million against a $3.5 million budget. The film stars Lance Henriksen, John D'Aquino, Jeff East, and Kerry Remsen.

As a child, Ed Harley witnesses a man be killed by a monster. In the present day, Harley's son Billy is killed by a group of teenagers. Ed contacts a witch named Haggis, first asking for the resurrection of Billy and then for revenge against the teens. Ed then retrieves a corpse so Haggis could complete the ritual that summons Pumpkinhead. Meanwhile, the teens contemplate what to do, but are interrupted by Pumpkinhead who terrorizes them throughout the night.

=== Pumpkinhead II: Blood Wings (1994) ===
A direct-to-video film that is loosely connected to the others in the series. It was released on October 19, 1994. The film stars Andrew Robinson, Ami Dolenz, Soleil Moon Frye, and Roger Clinton Jr.

The film follows Sheriff Sean Braddock and his daughter Jenny coming to the town of Ferren Woods. An orphan who is the offspring of Pumpkinhead, Tommy, was killed thirty-five years ago in the town by a group of teens. In the present day, Jenny and a group of teens, including Denny, the son of Tommy's murderer Judge Dixon, inadvertently resurrect Tommy in the form of Pumpkinhead. Pumpkinhead then terrorizes the town, killing many of its inhabitants.

=== Pumpkinhead: Ashes to Ashes (2006) ===
A TV film produced back-to-back with the fourth film was released on October 28, 2006. The film stars Lance Henriksen, Doug Bradley, and Lisa McAllister.

The townspeople are angered over the local mortician stealing and selling the organs of their loved ones and then dumping the corpses in a swamp, rather than cremating them. The townspeople have the old witch Haggis summon Pumpkinhead through the mummified body of Ed Harley, who was killed in the first film. Pumpkinhead returns and proceeds to go on his killing rampage murdering all those responsible for the desecration, while Doc Frasier hurries to murder those who summoned Pumpkinhead, which will effectively kill the demon in the process.

=== Pumpkinhead: Blood Feud (2007) ===
A TV film produced back-to-back with the third film was released on February 10, 2007. The film stars Bob Gunter, Amy Manson, and Lance Henriksen.

Two motorcycle riders are fleeing Pumpkinhead, coming to a log cabin and finding the summoner of Pumpkinhead. After the summoner is killed and Pumpkinhead vanishes, Ed Harley appears, warning of Pumpkinseed's curse. Following the real-life events of the Hatfield-McCoy feud, star-crossed lovers Judy Hatfield and Ricky McCoy are caught in the midst of their family's feud. After the death of Sarah McCoy, Ricky and the summoner Haggis resurrect Pumpkinhead to take revenge on the Hatfields.

=== Reboot ===
A reboot of the series is in the works and was to be produced by Saw executive producer Peter Block. Nate Atkins was set to write the script as a homage to the original film. As of November 2021, the reboot is now made by Paramount Players with a script already written and news of who would direct to be announced "in the coming months".

== Cast ==
Character	Pumpkinhead	Pumpkinhead II Blood Wings	Pumpkinhead Ashes to Ashes	Pumpkinhead Blood Feud
Character	1988	1994	2006	2007
Pumpkinhead	Tom Woodruff Jr.	Mark McCracken	Bob Gunter	Bob Gunter
Ed Harley	Lance Henriksen		Lance Henriksen	Lance Henriksen
Haggis	Florence Schauffer		Lynne Verrall	Lynne Verrall
Joel	John D'Aquino			
Chris	Jeff East			
Maggie	Kerry Remsen			
Kim	Kimberly Ross			
Christine Wallace	Mayim Bialik			
Mr. Wallace	Buck Flower			

== Reception ==
=== Box office performance ===
Film	Release date	Box office gross			Budget	Reference
Film	Release date	North America	Other territories	Worldwide	Budget	Reference
Pumpkinhead	October 14, 1988	$4,385,516	N/A	N/A	$3.5 million	

=== Critical and public response ===
Film	Rotten Tomatoes	Metacritic
Pumpkinhead	65% (23 reviews)	47 (10 reviews)
Pumpkinhead II: Blood Wings	13% (8 reviews)	
