= Method (2004 film) =

2004 film directed by Duncan Roy

- Directed by: Duncan Roy
- Written by: Duncan Roy; Katie L. Fetting
- Produced by: Donald Kushner; Guy J. Louthan; Pierre Spengler; Andrew Stevens; Brad Wyman
- Starring: Elizabeth Hurley; Jeremy Sisto; Oliver Tobias
- Cinematography: Gabriel Kosuth
- Edited by: George Akers
- Music by: Barry Taylor; Neal Acree
- Release date: June 24, 2004 (Russia)
- Running time: 93 min
- Countries: United Kingdom; United States; Switzerland; Romania
- Language: English

Method is a 2004 thriller film directed by Duncan Roy. The international co-production is a film within a film about a cast and crew who are in Romania to make a film about serial killer, Belle Gunness.

== Plot ==
During filming the lead actress (Elizabeth Hurley), tries to get deeply into character since the film is very important to her career. She may go too far when incidents on the set begin to pattern themselves after the real-life story.

== Cast ==
- Elizabeth Hurley as Rebecca
- Jeremy Sisto as Jake Fields
- Oliver Tobias as Teddy
- Carmen du Sautoy as Mother (Mona)
- John Barrowman as Timothy Stevens
- Sam Douglas as Mr. Hinkley
- Hannah Yelland as Bethany Fields

== Production ==
The film later generated headlines over the public falling out between leading lady, Hurley and the director, Roy. Roy claimed Hurley was difficult to work with. Hurley's spokesman denied the claims and cited that Hurley had earlier even recommended Roy as director of the project. Oliver Tobias, a co-star on the production, rebutted Roy's claims, remarking that he had a pleasant working experience with Hurley, who was “a lady” and a “consummate professional”.
