= Sharon Rotimi =

Nigerian Actress

- Born: Sharon Oluwapelumi Ebiere Rotimi; 21 April 1996 (age 30); Ekiti State, Nigeria
- Education: Obafemi Awolowo University
- Occupation: Actress

Sharon Oluwapelumi Rotimi (born 21 April 1996) is a Nigerian actress best known for her roles in Wura, Finding Me, and the Netflix film Son of the soil.

== Early life and education ==
Sharon Oluwapelumi Ebiere Rotimi was born in Nigeria and has Ekiti and Bayelsa heritage. The eldest of three children, she attended Krisbethel College for her secondary school education and initially trained as a registered nurse at the Ogun State School of Nursing in Ilaro. Rotimi later earned a bachelor's degree in zoology from Obafemi Awolowo University in Ile-Ife, Nigeria.

== Career ==
Rotimi starred in the Netflix film Son of the Soil written and led by Raz Adoti, and as Florence 'Flo' Odenigbo in the series Chronicles. In late 2024, she starred in The Artifact: Stones of Fatima, an adventure film directed by Tolu Lordtanner Awobiyi. The film was screened at the 13th Africa International Film Festival (AFRIFF) and released to cinemas in March 2025. She has also starred in the Africa Magic series The Yard, the film Finding Me by Funke Akindele released exclusively on Prime Video, and the faith-based series The Wives, which was nominated for Best Writing TV Series at the 2026 AMVCAs.

In April 2026, Rotimi began playing the role of Timininu "Tumi" Kuti in the fourth season of the hit series Wura, replacing Martha Ehinome.
