= Second in Command =

- DVD cover
- Directed by: Simon Fellows
- Written by: Jonathan Bowers; David Corley; Jayson Rothwell
- Story by: Milton Bearden; Jonathan Bowers; David Corley
- Produced by: Brad Krevoy; Donald Kushner; Pierre Spengler
- Starring: Jean-Claude Van Damme; Julie Cox; Alan McKenna; William Tapley; Raz Adoti; Velibor Topić
- Cinematography: Douglas Milsome
- Music by: Mark Sayfritz
- Production companies: Clubdeal; Castel Film Romania; MPCA
- Distributed by: Sony Pictures Home Entertainment
- Release date: May 2, 2006
- Running time: 92 minutes
- Country: United States
- Language: English
- Budget: $12 million

Second in Command is a 2006 American action film, starring Jean-Claude Van Damme and directed by Simon Fellows. The film was released direct-to-DVD in the United States on May 2, 2006.

== Plot ==
Commander Sam Keenan (Jean-Claude Van Damme), a decorated US Navy SEAL, is sent to the Eastern European nation of Moldova to become the new security attaché at the US Embassy.

When he arrives, Keenan learns that Moldavia is in the middle of a civil war. At the embassy, Keenan meets with Ambassador George Norland (Colin Stinton), who designates Keenan as his "second in command", despite the traditional diplomatic hierarchy, which is contested by others afterward. Recently, the US installed a new government in Moldova, which is led by Moldavia's newly elected president Yuri Amirev (Șerban Celea). Amirev wants the nation to be run as a democratic republic, but under the command of Anton Tavarov (Velibor Topić), communist insurgents have caused a riot at the presidential palace, threatening the fragile stability of the country. The insurgents are loyal to Alexei Kirilov (Costel Lupea), the former brutal communist dictator of Moldova.

When the palace guards start firing on the insurgents without Amirev's authorization, the insurgents storm the palace, demanding Amirev's head. Keenan volunteers to bring Amirev to the embassy. But events reach critical mass, and the insurgents open fire. Keenan barely makes it back with Amirev, but the fight isn't over yet. Fifty Americans are holed up in the embassy, and Tavarov and his massive army have arrived at the gates, with plans to crash the building and drag Amirev out by any means necessary. To add to Keenan's problems, Norland is killed by a rocket that was launched by one of Tavarov's men.

To defend the embassy, Keenan has: only 15 Marines, CIA bureaucrat Frank Gaines (William Tapley), limited ammunition and his martial arts skills, to hold Tavarov's army off until American reinforcements arrive. To make matters worse, Keenan's girlfriend, reporter Michelle Whitman (Julie Cox), is one of the hostages. With Tavarov's crew getting in position for attack, a power struggle takes place between Keenan and Gaines; with help hours away, it will be up to Keenan to rescue the hostages.

When the supposedly loyal General Borgov (a personal CIA "asset" claimed by Gaines) arrives, he turns out to side with the insurgents, but Keenan rescues the surviving personnel with help from arriving American military reinforcements.

== Cast ==
- Jean-Claude Van Damme as Commander Sam Keenan
- Julie Cox as Michelle Whitman
- Alan McKenna as Captain John Baldwin
- William Tapley as Frank Gaines
- Raz Adoti as Gunnery Sergeant Earl Darnell
- Velibor Topić as Anton Tavarov
- Warren Derosa as Mike Shustec
- Ian Virgo as Corporal Will Butler
- Șerban Celea as President Yuri Amirev
- Vlad Ivanov as Regional Security Officer John Lydon
- Emanuel Pârvu as Corporal Chevantón
- Răzvan Oprea as Private First Class Devereaux
- Mihai Bisericanu as Marshall Geller
- Elizabeth Barondes as Jennifer Lennard
- Colin Stinton as Ambassador George Norland
- Dan Rădulescu as Private First Class Pazzini
- Cătălin Paraschiv as Private First Class Burke
- Eugen Cristea as General Borgov
- Costel Lupea as President Alexei Kirilov

== Production ==
The story is set in Moldavia. It was filmed in Bucharest, Romania in 50 days, between June 7 and July 27, 2005.

== Reception ==
The film opened in the 24th place with $1.04 million in the rentals chart.

David Nusair of Reel Film Reviews gave it 1.5 points out of 4. He said that after Van Damme's surprisingly decent previous film Wake of Death, it was hard not to be disappointed and criticized the "astonishingly inept directorial choices".

== Home media ==
DVD was released in Region 1 in the United States on May 2, 2006. It was released in Region 2 in the United Kingdom on 15 May 2006. It was distributed by Sony Pictures Home Entertainment.
