= The Hard Corps =

- Official DVD cover
- Directed by: Sheldon Lettich
- Written by: Sheldon Lettich; George Saunders
- Produced by: Brad Krevoy; Donald Kushner; Pierre Spengler
- Starring: Jean-Claude Van Damme; Raz Adoti; Vivica A. Fox; Peter James Bryant
- Cinematography: Douglas Milsome
- Edited by: Matthew Booth
- Music by: Joseph Metcalfe
- Production companies: Clubdeal; Motion Picture Corporation of America
- Distributed by: Sony Pictures Home Entertainment
- Release date: August 15, 2006
- Running time: 110 minutes
- Country: United States
- Language: English

The Hard Corps is a 2006 American action film directed by Sheldon Lettich, written by Lettich and George Saunders, and released by Sony Pictures Home Entertainment. It stars Jean-Claude Van Damme with a supporting cast of Raz Adoti, Vivica A. Fox and Peter James Bryant. It is the fourth collaboration between Van Damme and director Sheldon Lettich. The film was released direct-to-DVD in the United States on August 15, 2006.

== Plot ==
Phillip Sauvage (Jean-Claude Van Damme) is an American soldier recovering from Post-Traumatic Stress Disorder caused by his time in Iraq and Afghanistan in a VA hospital. The release of notorious rap mogul Terrell Singletery (Viv Leacock) from prison has caused Wayne Barclay's (Raz Adoti) worried older sister and manager Tamara (Vivica A. Fox) to hire increased security. Wayne, a retired heavyweight champion turned businessman and community leader, is apparently a target of Terrell's who's known to issue hits on his enemies. A member of Wayne's staff named Mullins served with Clarence Bowden (Julian D. Christopher) in the Army and brings him in on the security detail; he, in turn, brings Sauvage, whom he mentored in the Army as well.

During their first gig doing security outside a club, Terrell sends a hit squad for Wayne. Clarence is killed and Sauvage arrested for possession of an automatic weapon. After bailing him out, Tamara moves him into Wayne's guest house and hires him as head of security. Sauvage insists on bringing in his own colleagues for the security team, but Wayne forces him to train members of his boxing gym. Sauvage brings on fellow veteran Sergeant Casey Bledsoe (Mark Griffin) to train the recruits. Tamara is apparently smitten by Sauvage, who shows little interest, but her advances worry Wayne, who is informed by Detective Teague that Sauvage is actually an unstable killer who massacred children in Iraq.

Terrell sends another hit squad to stake out Wayne's girlfriend's place (Lydia) to try to hit him again; Wayne tries to sneak out to see her because Tamara does not approve. Sauvage catches him and insists on going with him. While Sauvage inspects an alley, Kujo (another bodyguard with them) sees the hit squad. After a struggle, Wayne's men manage to subdue the hit squad and leave them for the police.

The next day, Sauvage tries to dissuade Wayne from giving a speech at a sports complex opening, but he becomes angry with Sauvage's restrictions. When they see a suspicious man in the crowd, Sauvage orders the new guards to take him down, causing a riot. The man was only reaching for his cell phone and Wayne is embarrassed by the bad press. Sauvage quits and insists on fighting Wayne to prove his methods are sound. Tamara storms off and Sauvage sends Jesse, a female guard, with her.

After a vicious fight between Wayne and Sauvage, they hear that Jesse was attacked and Tamara taken. Detective Teague suspiciously asks if they heard anything about Tamara, which they did not mention. In the car, Sauvage and Wayne discuss the true Iraq incident and Terrell and Wayne's history. Lydia calls and insists Wayne come see her alone (unbeknownst to them with a gun to her head) and Sauvage hatches a plan. Wayne discovers Detective Teague inside, who has been working for Terrell, and Sauvage cuts the power. He and the guards break in and apprehend the thugs and learn that Tamara is at Terrell's house.

Wayne and his guards pose as Terrell's thugs to get inside his gate and confront him. Sauvage and Bledsoe secure Tamara and Wayne and Mullins take on Terrell's boys. The fight culminates in Wayne killing Terrell and Sauvage being shot but saved by his vest. In the aftermath, Wayne comes to terms with Tamara and Sauvage's relationship begins, and they kiss.

== Cast ==
- Jean-Claude Van Damme as Phillippe Sauvage
- Vivica A. Fox as Tamara Barclay
- Raz Adoti as Wayne Barclay
- Peter James Bryant as Kendall Mullins
- Ron Bottitta as Detective Teague
- Viv Leacock as Terrell Singletery
- Adrian Holmes as "Cujo"
- Mark Griffin as Casey Bledsoe
- Ronald Selmour as Simcoe
- Aaron Au as Kim
- Dexter Bell as "High Dog"
- Julian D. Christopher as Clarence Bowden
- Nneka Croal as Jessie Otero
- Sharon Amos as Lydia
- Doron Bell Jr. as Leonard

== Production ==
It was filmed at Vancouver, British Columbia, Canada, in 39 days on November 7 and December 16, 2005, and also filmed in Bucharest Romania in four days on January 12 and January 16, 2006.

== Release ==
The DVD was released in the United States on August 15, 2006, by Sony Pictures Home Entertainment.

== Reception ==
Beyond Hollywood wrote that the film's slow pacing and buildup do not live up to direct-to-video fans' expectations, though it is better than contemporary Steven Seagal films. Ian Jane of DVD Talk rated it 2.5/5 stars and wrote, "While The Hard Corps has a few shining moments, overall it's just not all that compelling".
