= Finding Me (2025 film) =

2025 Nigerian film

- Directed by: Funke Akindele
- Produced by: Funke Akindele
- Distributed by: Amazon Prime Video
- Release date: 16 March 2025
- Country: Nigeria

Finding Me is a 2025 Nigerian drama film produced and directed by Funke Akindele. It stars Funke Akindele, Joseph Benjamin, Efa Iwara, Omoni Oboli, and Omowumi Dada. Released on 16 March 2025, the film was distributed by Amazon Prime Video.

== Plot ==
Atinuke Phillips, a successful CEO struggling with low self-esteem, is trapped in an abusive marriage with Kolawole, who belittles her and exploits her wealth. Pressured by her father, Chief Olowo, to remain in the marriage and undermined by her brother, Dotun, she seeks change and meets Anthony, a struggling gym instructor. Despite his relationship with his girlfriend, Ndidi, the two grow close, and an affair leads to Atinuke's pregnancy.

After making a large financial withdrawal at Kolawole's request, Atinuke loses her position as CEO to Dotun. As her husband's abuse intensifies, including public humiliation, she uncovers evidence of his fraudulent activities. Following a series of betrayals and confrontations, Atinuke ultimately resolves to leave the marriage and reclaim control of her life.

== Cast ==
- Funke Akindele as Atinuke Phillips
- Joseph Benjamin as Kolawole
- Efa Iwara as Anthony
- Femi Adebayo as Dotun
- Omowumi Dada as Ndidi
- Omoni Oboli as Sarah
- Dele Odule as Chief Olowo
- Sharon Rotimi as Ngozi

== Reception ==
The film received mixed to negative reviews from critics.

Nelson Chigozirim of What Kept Me Up praised the performance of Joseph Benjamin but criticised the film's dialogue and the on-screen chemistry between Funke Akindele and Efa Iwara.

Writing for Premium Times, Nosakhale Akhimien said the plot was rushed and that some characters were underdeveloped.

In a 2/5 rating, Vivian Nneka Nwajiaku of Afrocritik wrote that "Finding Me does not know what it wants to be. Its tone is chaotic, the production rowdy, and the plot overly bloated, with a runtime of two hours and thirty-five minutes".

Shalom Obisesan of Nolly Critic gave the film a rating of 2.2/5, stating that "it is a film with moments of brilliance buried under a mountain of narrative noise. It entertains, but only if you do not think too hard".
