= Son of the Soil =

2025 Nigerian film

- Promotional poster
- Directed by: Chee Keong Cheung
- Written by: Chee Keong Cheung; Razaaq Adoti
- Produced by: Andreas Roald; Ioanna Karavela
- Starring: Patience Ozokwor; Iretiola Doyle; Sharon Rotimi
- Production companies: Action Xtreme; Sovereign Films; Boxonia Blueprint
- Distributed by: Netflix
- Release date: March 2025
- Country: Nigeria
- Language: English

Son of the Soil is a 2025 Nigerian film, directed by Chee Keong Cheung, who co-wrote the film with British film producer Razaaq Adoti. The film stars Patience Ozokwor, Iretiola Doyle, and Sharon Rotimi, among others.

Distributed by Netflix, Son of the Soil premiered at the 2025 Africa International Film Festival (AFRIFF). In 2026, it made its US debut at the 34th Pan African Film Festival in Los Angeles.

== Cast ==
- Razaaq Adoti as Zion Ladejo
- Sharon Rotimi as Ronke
- Patience Ozokwor as Zion's mother
- Philip Asaya as Dr. Baptiste
- Sunshine Rosman
- Taye Arimoro
- James Damilare

== Background ==
The film was produced by Andreas Roald, the CEO of Sovereign Films, a film production company in the United Kingdom, Ioanna Karavela, Chee Keong Cheung, and Razaaq Adoti, in association with Wingonia Ikpi's Boxonia Blueprint, a Nigerian film production company. In 2025, Nile Entertainment, a Nigerian production company bought the distribution rights for the film for African viewers.

The film was entirely shot in Lagos, Nigeria.

== Reception ==
Premium Times praised the actors' performances, especially Zion whom it compared with John Wick, however faults the film's writing. In a starred review by Phil Hoad of The Guardian, he gave the film 3 out of 5, lauding Cheung's direction and relating the film as memory of 2002 City of God.

Son of the Soil premiered at the 2025 Black Star International Film Festival in Ghana, where it won three awards: for Best Film, Best Director, and Best International Showcase. It won the Audience Choice Award at the 2025 Africa International Film Festival (AFRIFF). Earning five nominations at the Best of Nollywood Awards, it won Best Child Actress and Most Promising Actor awards.
