= Charles Thorson =

Canadian illustrator (1890–1966)

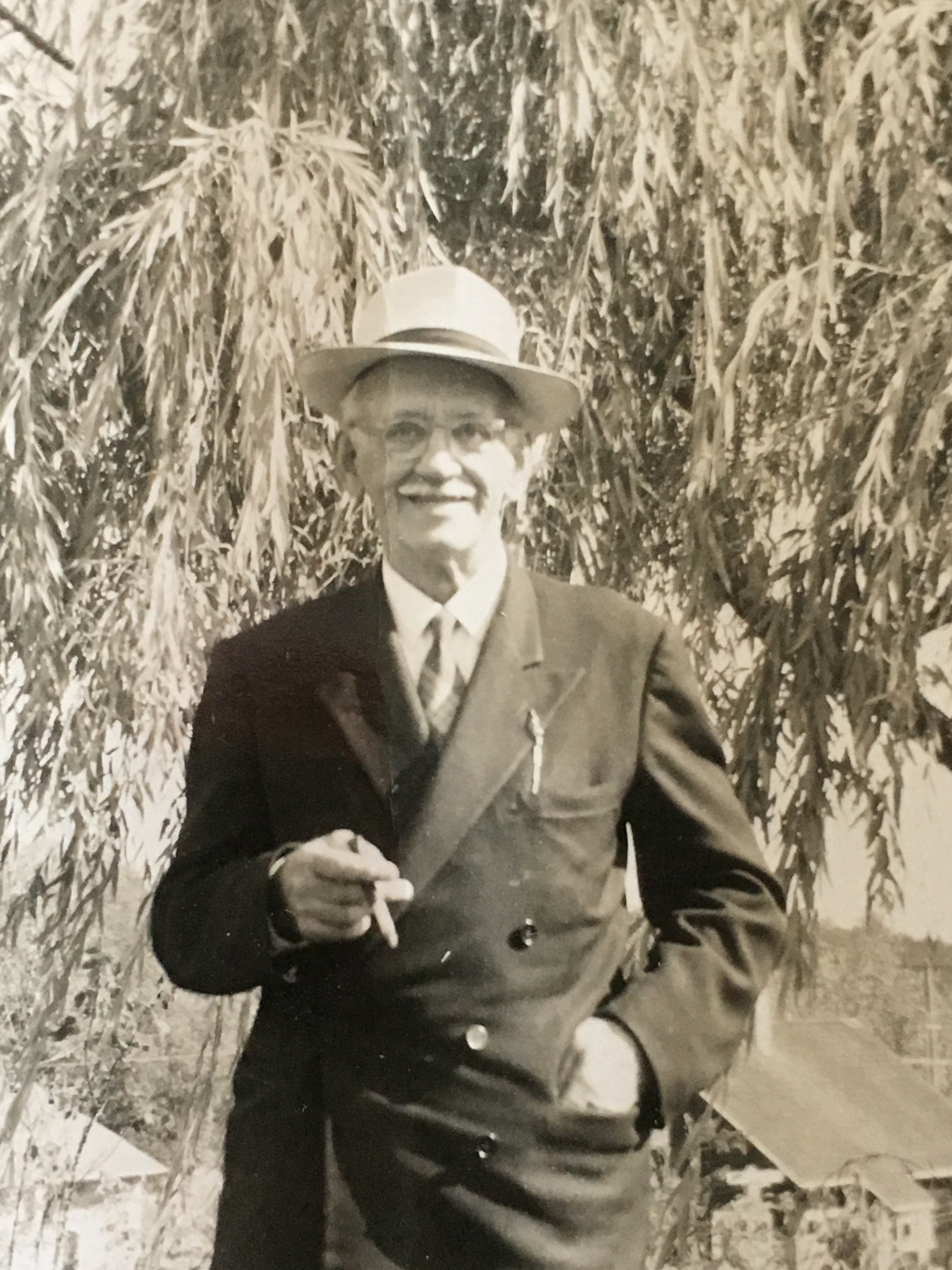
- Thorson, c. 1964
- Born: Karl Gústaf Stefánsson; August 29, 1890 Gimli, Manitoba, Canada
- Died: 7 August 1966 (aged 75) Vancouver, British Columbia, Canada
- Area: Cartoonist
- Notable works: Bugs Bunny, Elmer Fudd

Charles "Charlie" Gustav Thorson (29 August 1890 – 7 August 1966) was a Canadian political cartoonist, character designer, children's book author and illustrator. Thorson is best known as the man who designed an early version of the then yet unnamed Bugs Bunny. He also designed the Disney characters Snow White and Little Hiawatha.

== Early life and family ==
Thorson was born in Gimli, Manitoba, Canada, and given the name Karl Gústaf Stefánsson. He was of Icelandic descent, as his parents were part of the Icelandic immigration to Canada in the 19th century. His parents were part of the 1,700 Icelanders who registered with the Winnipeg Immigration Office in 1887. Politician Joseph Thorson was his older brother.

== Career ==
Thorson's self-portrait drawing in 1931 portrayed him as a Viking based on his Icelandic descent.

Thorson worked at Walt Disney Productions' story department from 1935 to 1937. He worked on Silly Symphony shorts and contributed to designs for Snow White and the Seven Dwarfs. He joined Metro-Goldwyn-Mayer where he worked on adapting The Captain and the Kids. He joined Leon Schlesinger Productions in July 1938. Thorson claimed to have created Bugs Bunny "solely by myself and without the assistance or direction of anyone else". He later worked for Fleischer Studios.

Thorson wrote two children's books, Keeko in 1947 and Chee-chee and Keeko in 1952, about the adventures of a little Native American boy. He also created the character Punkinhead, which appeared in several children's books and in Eaton's catalogues for many years.

Thorson lived his life without public credit for his creations. His name was never mentioned in associated movie credits, and "rarely mentioned in studio records or in other animation books." These creations can be found in Thorson's personal albums that includes sketches and model drawings shared with his family.

Thorson died in Vancouver, British Columbia, in 1966.

== Works cited ==
- Mazurkewich, Karen (1999). Cartoon Capers: The History of Canadian Animators. McArthur & Company Publishing. ISBN 1-55278-093-7.

== Bibliography ==
- Cartoon Charlie: The Life and Art of Animation Pioneer Charles Thorson, by Prof. Gene Walz (with the assistance of Stephen Thorson. Winnipeg, Manitoba, Canada: Great Plains Publications, 1998. 222 pages. ISBN 0-9697804-9-4.
- Charlie Thorson fonds, University of Manitoba
