= J. K. Farnell =

British toy company

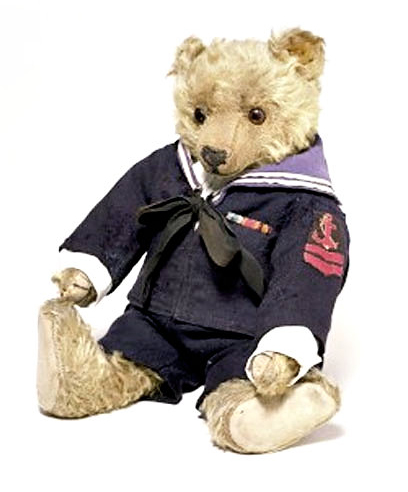
Teddy bear manufactured by the London-based firm of J. K. Farnell

John Kirby Farnell or J. K. Farnell was a London company which manufactured the first British teddy bear in 1906.

== Beginnings and endings ==
Founded in Notting Hill, the firm was started in 1840 by a silk merchant, John Kirby Farnell, and made items such as pin cushions and tea cosies. After Farnell's death, his children, Henry and Agnes, continued the business from Acton in West London.

They produced soft toys, moving from rabbit skin to mohair. Farnell rapidly became one of the leading teddy bear manufacturers, registering the Alpha trademark in 1925. "The Teddy Bear Encyclopedia" states that the Alpha Bear inspired the creation of Winnie the Pooh - Christopher Robin Milne (son of the Winnie the Pooh books' author A. A. Milne and basis of the character Christopher Robin) owned one of the Alpha Bears.

The company premises were destroyed by fire in 1934 and by bombing in 1940. It finally ceased trading in the 1960s and the Farnell name was taken over by Merrythought in 1996.

== Appearance ==
The first Farnell bears closely resembled their German Steiff counterparts, having pointed muzzles, long limbs, humpbacks and webbed toes. Early Farnell bears also had boot-button eyes which were replaced by painted glass ones. The soles were of felt and reinforced with cardboard.
