= Nic and Pic =

Canadian children's television series

Nic and Pic (French: Nic et Pic) is a Canadian children's television show that aired during the 1970s. Its stories revolved around the adventures of puppet mice Nic and Pic as they travelled around the world in a hot air balloon.

The series aired in French on Télévision de Radio-Canada from 1972 to 1977, and a dubbed English version aired on CBC Television from 1975 to 1977.

The French version was voiced by Jocelyne Goyette as Nic and Louise Matteau as Pic, while the English version was voiced by Joan Stuart as Nic and Madeleine Kronby as Pic. The puppeteers were Pierre Régimbald and Michel Fréchette.

The series was spun off to a number of children's books, written by Michel Cailloux and illustrated by Claude Poirier and Serge Wilson. The puppets also hosted the first francophone broadcast of the Toronto Santa Claus Parade in 1973.
