= Merrythought =

Toy manufacturing company

Coordinates: 52.63°N 2.494°W

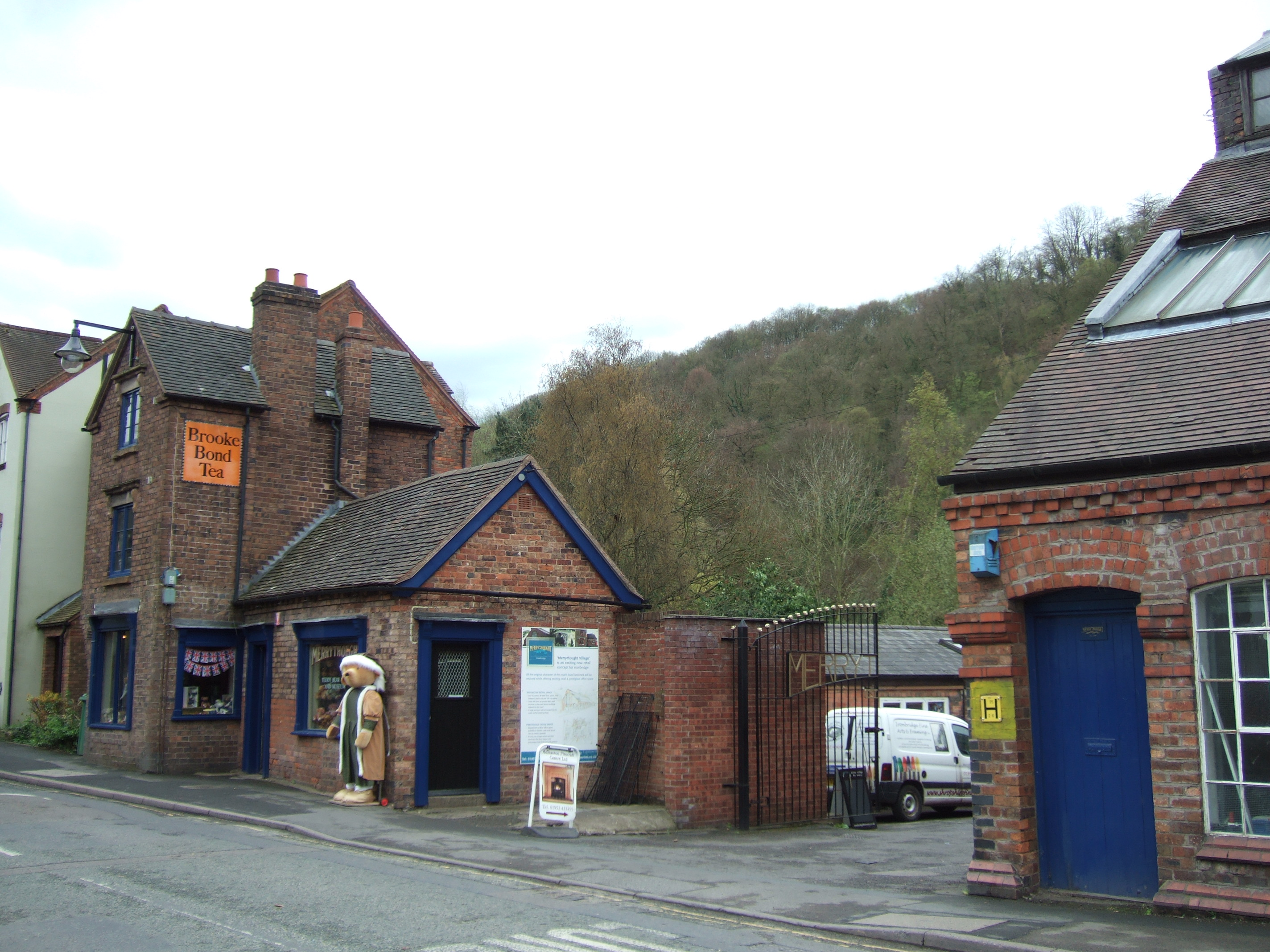
- Type: Private limited company
- Industry: Toy manufacturer
- Founded: 1930
- Founder: Gordon Holmes and George H. Laxton
- Fate: Operating
- Headquarters: Ironbridge, Shropshire, England
- Area served: Worldwide (principal markets: UK and Japan)
- Key people: Sarah and Hannah Holmes
- Owner: Holmes family
- Number of employees: 25
- Website: www.merrythought.co.uk

Merrythought is a toy manufacturing company established in 1930 in the United Kingdom. The company specialises in soft toys, especially teddy bears. Merrythought has handmade traditional teddy bears in the World Heritage Site of Ironbridge, Telford and Wrekin, Shropshire, England since 1930.

The company's site in Ironbridge has a small museum and shop open to the public, and is where the toys are made. The site is a former iron foundry building on the banks of the River Severn, less than half a mile (0.7 km) upstream from the world-famous Iron Bridge itself. The vicinity is known as Dale End, lying at the bottom of the Coalbrookdale valley, and falls within the wider Ironbridge Gorge World Heritage Site.

The origin of the firm's name is uncertain but possibly derives from an archaic word for "wishbone" – the company has used a wishbone as an emblem from 1930.

== History ==
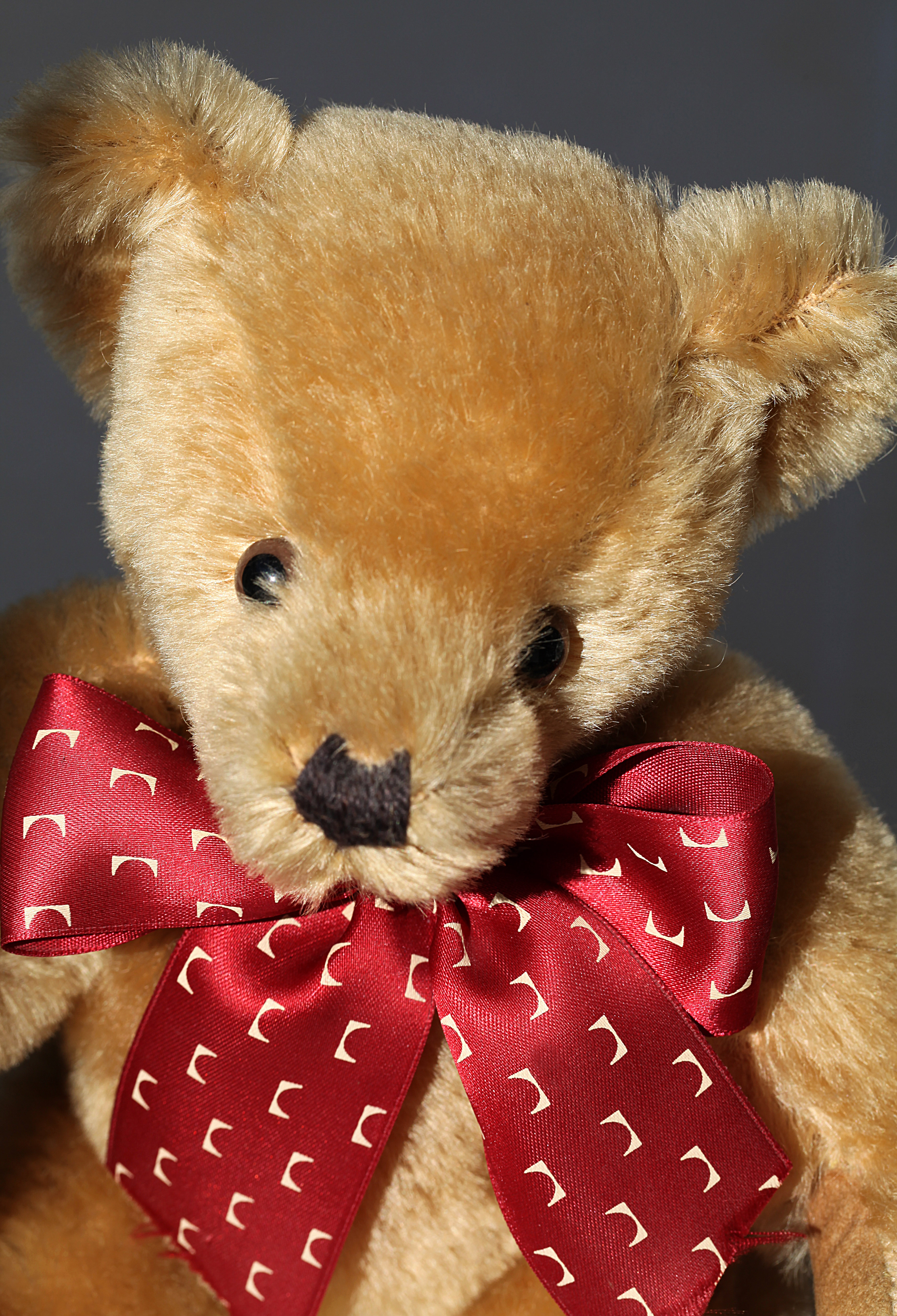
A Merrythought teddy bear from the 2000s, made with mohair and with a bow decorated with Iron Bridges.

Merrythought was founded in 1930 by Gordon Holmes and George H. Laxton, with the first catalogue in 1931. The company hired AC Janisch who had been in charge of sales at J. K. Farnell as well as two former employees of Chad Valley, Clifton James Rendle and Florence May Attwood, with Attwood producing the company's first catalogue – an imaginative range of 32 toys including the first Merrythought teddy bear 'Magnet' ('M' series). Perhaps Merrythought's most famous individual bear was "Mr Whoppit", the mascot of land and water speed record breaker Donald Campbell. The company first produced teddy bears based on the "Woppit" character (a teddy bear himself) from the Robin comic in 1956.

The company at first rented rooms at the Station Hotel in Wellington before moving to a building in Coalbrookdale; in February 1931 Merrythought moved permanently to its present site in Ironbridge. Business grew rapidly, despite the Great Depression, with the Ironbridge site becoming the largest soft toy factory in Britain in 1935 and by 1939 over 200 people worked for Merrythought. The company's site was rented at first, but was purchased from the Coalbrookdale Company in 1956. Merrythought has operated from the same site, situated between The Wharfage and the River Severn, since 1931, with the exception of during World War II when the site was requisitioned by the Admiralty (for map-making) from the outbreak of war in September 1939. During the War, the company operated from Wellington and produced equipment for war use; Merrythought returned to their Ironbridge site in 1946. The oldest of the factory buildings had been constructed in 1898; further buildings were added to the site during the 20th century as the business grew.

Trayton Holmes, son of founder Gordon Holmes, joined the company in 1949; his son, Oliver Holmes, joined the company in 1972 and eventually became the managing director. Also in 1949 notable designer Clifton Rendle died, while Florence Attwood lived until 1952. After the war new buildings were built on the site and an automatic stuffing machine was bought from the United States in 1955. In 1957 the "Cheeky" bear was first introduced to the Merrythought range, a design which continues to be produced to the present day. In 1996 the Farnell brand name was bought by Merrythought. In 2001 a special Hope Bear was produced, raising money for the World Trade Center Disaster Fund.

The company altered during the 2000s' due to "the ongoing effects of external economics", specifically cheap foreign-produced goods with which Merrythought could not compete due to the high production costs associated with manufacturing in the UK. Merrythought's extensive range of plush animals (which were all British made) was no longer competitive against products from overseas so production of these products ceased. In 2007 a catalogue was unveiled, with a "much sharper, collector-focused group of products", focusing on the traditional mohair teddy bears that Merrythought had become most famous for since the 1930s. From 2007 to 2010 an independent company took on production of the teddy bears in the original factory at the Ironbridge site, with Merrythought Ltd purely managing product development and sales. This was a short-lived partnership and Merrythought ended up bringing production back in-house in early 2010 and have since then continued to manage all elements of the business from Ironbridge, Shropshire. All Merrythought teddy bears are still 100% handmade in England.

Oliver Holmes died from cancer, aged 60, on 30 April 2011. The eldest of his three daughters, Sarah, was working at Merrythought at the time so took over the running of the company; she was shortly joined by her younger sister Hannah who left her career in London to join the family firm; together they are the fourth generation in the Holmes family to be involved in the company. Sarah and Hannah Holmes are now joint managing directors.

Merrythought was awarded the 2011 Supplier Award by the famous, luxury London department store Fortnum & Mason (which has outlets in Japan), with limited edition bears for the store currently being made. In 2011 Merrythought also won the prestigious, National, Red Ribbon Family Business Award for Innovation and Sarah Holmes won the Midlands Family Business Award for an 'Outstanding Contribution' to her business.

== Present day ==
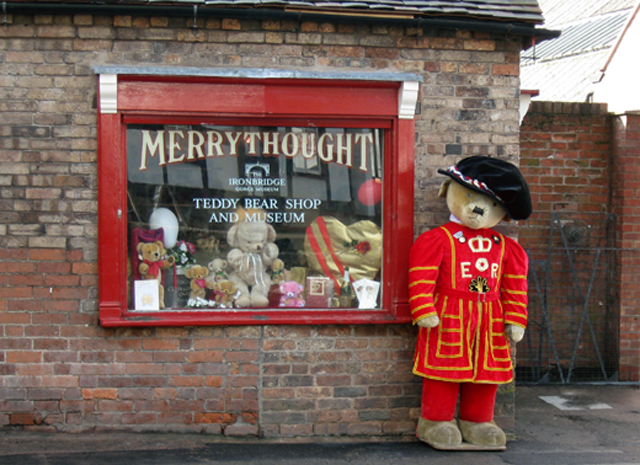
The shop and museum, which first opened in 1988, is one of the visitor attractions in the area. It is run and managed directly by Merrythought, though it used to be part of the Ironbridge Gorge Museums.

The company still uses traditional methods and materials (such as mohair for its bears) to produce a limited range of hand-crafted toys, appealing to the high end of the market. The founder's grandson, Oliver Holmes, ran the business as managing director until his death in 2011; his eldest daughter, Sarah Holmes, has been involved in its management since 2010, and middle daughter Hannah Holmes since 2011, thereby continuing the Holmes family connection. As of 2011, all four shareholders are members of the Holmes family.

The present range includes for the most part traditional and collectable teddy bears (including the company's collectable "Punkinhead" (1948) and "Cheeky" (1956) variants), some other soft toy animals. Since the relaunch in 2007 the collectable part of the range consists of numerous special designs, each produced in a limited batch (typically between 75 and 200 units) and with new designs regularly coming onto the market. Recent commemorative bears include those for the wedding of Prince William and Kate Middleton, the Queen's Diamond Jubilee, and in memory of the late Oliver Holmes.

There is a notable foreign export market for the company's products, with Merrythought teddy bears being sent all over the world, most significantly in Japan, where in recent years a "cult following" of Merrythought Bears has developed; the depreciation of the British pound against the Japanese yen since 2008 has also helped sales there. The recent depreciation of the pound has also helped the company compete in the UK against imports, including those from continental Europe.

Displays of historic and current Merrythought products can be seen at the small shop and museum located at the company's Ironbridge site, which is open seven days a week throughout the year and is free to enter.

=== Merrythought Village ===
Part of the Merrythought site is now rented out to other businesses, as the company has scaled down operations, with many of the factory and associated buildings not in use by Merrythought rented out to other companies. The overall site therefore has become mixed use with office, workshop and retail units, and has been named the Merrythought Village. The Village at present includes the Merrythought company's factory and its teddy bear museum and shop, but is also home to Ironbridge Interiors, Crystal Labyrinth, Ironbridge Fine Arts and Framing, Ironbridge Scenic River Cruises, Admaston Firecraft Centre Ltd, Ironbridge Arts and Antiques Centre and the Ironworkers of Ironbridge. The Ironbridge Brewery was located at the Village until 2014 (it moved to Wellington and has been renamed) and brewed real ale in the building closest to the Severn. A Co-op supermarket opened at the Village in December 2014. The Merrythought site's historic name is the Dale End Works, sometimes still used on postal addresses.

=== 2012 Olympics ===
Merrythought was selected by the London Olympic Games organisers in February 2011 to produce the official teddy bears of the London 2012 Olympic and Paralympic games, giving the company a further boost. A range of London 2012 Olympic Games Commemorative Teddy Bears has been created each a Limited Edition of 2,012 pieces. Paralympic and Team GB Teddy Bears have also been produced. All of the Olympic teddy bears are handmade in England Merrythought's Ironbridge factory. Different bears have been produced to mark the Paralympic games. A bear has also been produced specifically for the British Olympic team.

=== Golly controversy ===
In modern times some people now regard the golliwogg, or Golly doll, that is a traditional children's toy dating back to the 19th Century, as a symbol of racism. From the 1930s Merrythought produced "gollies" as part of their traditional range and in August 2011 the Sunday People tabloid criticised Merrythought for producing Golly dolls, quoting the former athlete Darren Campbell who regards them as not in-keeping with "Olympic values". The company defended the dolls as "an innocent, traditional British toy". Since the company came under new management in 2011 the range has been discontinued, with a review of the overall product range given as the reason.

== Special Editions ==
Frequently the company releases 'Special Edition bears' usually with limited numbers. In July 2013 to commemorate the UK Royal baby Prince George, the company has released a special limited edition bear Other Royal owners include The Queen, who was presented with a Merrythought corgi in 1952. Prince Charles was given a specially-made hippo in 1982, while the Queen Mother, Prince William and Zara Phillips also have specially made bears.

Other previous special edition bears include a 2004 Merrythought bear called 'Heathcliff' where only 100 were made, unusually these were made with black mohair rather than the usual gold.

== Sources ==
- Martin, Kathy (2009). Merrythought Teddy Bears. Pen & Sword Books. ISBN 978-1-84468-032-0.
