= Pierre Spengler =

French film producer (born 1947)

- Born: 5 June 1947 (age 79); Paris, France
- Occupation: Film producer

Pierre Spengler (born 5 June 1947) is a French film producer. He is best known for producing the first three Superman films starring Christopher Reeve.

== Life and career ==
Born in Paris, Spengler began working in the film industry in 1964. His early credits included production assistant on The Madwoman of Chaillot (1969), Le Mans (1971), and The Light at the Edge of the World (also 1971).

=== Salkinds Organisation ===
In 1972, he became a partner in the Salkind Organisation. Alongside Alexander and Ilya Salkind, he obtained the film rights to Superman from DC Comics in 1974. He subsequently produced the first three Superman films starring Christopher Reeve. He was also a consultant on the 1984 spinoff film Supergirl.

Other films Spengler produced for the Salkinds during this time were Claude Chabrol's The Twist (1976), The Prince and the Pauper (1977), and Santa Claus: The Movie (1985). He left the Salkind Organisation in 1985 to become an independent producer.

=== Independent producer ===
In 1995, he executive produced Serbian director Emir Kusturica's film Underground, which won the Palme d'Or at the 1995 Cannes Film Festival. In 1996, he founded Clubdeal Ltd.

In 2004, he acquired French publishing house Les Humanoïdes Associés in order to develop their properties in movies.

He is also the founder of Netherlands-based Cadenza Films, with Dutch filmmaker Rudolf van den Berg. He produced/executive produced Berg's films Snapshots (2002), Tirza (2010), and Süskind (2012).

In 2012, he produced the France 4 television series Métal Hurlant Chronicles.

He produced the 2023 RKSS horror comedy We Are Zombies.

== Personal life ==
Spengler is married to University of Oxford geneticist Tatjana Sauka Spengler, and they have a daughter. They lived in Oxford, England. He has two other children from his previous marriage to Agnes L'Helgoualch.

== Filmography ==
=== Film ===
==== Producer ====
Year	Title	Director	Notes
1971	Kill! Kill! Kill! Kill!	Romain Gary	
1976	The Twist	Claude Chabrol	
1977	The Prince and the Pauper	Richard Fleischer	Also screenwriter
1978	Superman	Richard Donner	
1980	Superman II	Richard Lester	
1983	Superman III	Richard Lester	
1985	Santa Claus: The Movie	Jeannot Szwarc	
1989	The Return of the Musketeers	Richard Lester	
2002	Snapshots	Rudolf van den Berg	
2004	Stratosphere Girl	Matthias X. Oberg	
2004	Method	Duncan Roy	
2004	Blessed	Simon Fellows	
2005	Unleashed	Louis Leterrier	Co-producer
2005	7 Seconds	Simon Fellows	
2005	Snuff-Movie	Bernard Rose	
2005	The Marksman	Marcus Adams	
2005	Revolver	Guy Ritchie	Co-producer
2006	The Hard Corps	Sheldon Lettich	
2006	La piste	Éric Valli	Co-producer
2006	The Detonator	Po-Chih Leong	
2006	Second in Command	Simon Fellows	
2006	Superman II: The Richard Donner Cut	Richard Donner	Re-edit of Superman II
2006	Incubus	Anya Camilleri	
2006	Shadow Man	Michael Keusch	
2006	Attack Force	Michael Keusch	
2007	Flight of Fury	Michael Keusch	
2009	True True Lie	Eric Styles	
2023	We Are Zombies	RKSS	

===== Executive producer =====
Year	Title	Director	Notes
1990	The Rainbow Thief	Alejandro Jodorowsky	Uncredited
1992	The Turn of the Screw	Rusty Lemorande	
1995	Underground	Emir Kusturica	Also actor; as 'Russian Driver'
2003	Summer in the Golden Valley	Srđan Vuletić	
2006	Nafaka	Jasmin Durakovic	
2010	Tirza	Rudolf van den Berg	
2012	Süskind	Rudolf van den Berg	
2013	Puzzle	Andrei Zincã	

===== Other credits =====
Year	Title	Director	Notes
1969	The Madwoman of Chaillot	Bryan Forbes	Production assistant; uncredited
1971	Le Mans	Lee H. Katzin	Production assistant; uncredited
1971	The Light at the Edge of the World	Kevin Billington	Production assistant; uncredited
1972	Bluebeard	Edward Dmytryk	Executive in charge of production
1973	Murder in a Blue World	Eloy de la Iglesia	Assistant director
1973	The Three Musketeers	Richard Lester	Executive in charge of production
1974	The Four Musketeers	Richard Lester	Executive in charge of production
1984	Supergirl	Jeannot Szwarc	Consultant; uncredited

=== Television ===
==== Producer ====
Year	Title	Notes
2006	Pumpkinhead: Ashes to Ashes	TV movie
2007	Pumpkinhead: Blood Feud	TV movie

==== Executive producer ====
Year	Title	Notes
2012-14	Métal Hurlant Chronicles	11 episodes
