= Jackson: My Life... Your Fault =

- Directed by: Duncan Roy
- Written by: Duncan Roy
- Starring: Benjamin Soames; Georgina Hale; Alan Gilchrist
- Distributed by: British Film Institute
- Release date: 1995
- Running time: 41 minutes
- Country: United Kingdom
- Language: English

Jackson: My Life... Your Fault is a 1995 gay-themed film directed by Duncan Roy starring Benjamin Soames, Georgina Hale and Alan Gilchrist.

== Plot ==
Jackson (Benjamin Soames) has lived sheltered with his mother since his father's death when he was a little boy. He remembers the event from childhood, and is still troubled by it. His mother (Georgina Hale), is over-protective, and plays upon Jackson's emotions to keep him tied to her. On meeting an attractive policeman, he needs to decide whether to grow up or not.
