= Cover (film) =

- DVD Cover
- Directed by: Bill Duke
- Written by: Aaron Rahsaan Thomas
- Produced by: Michael A. DiManno; Bill Duke; Warren Kohler; Corey Redmond
- Starring: Aunjanue Ellis; Razaaq Adoti; Vivica A. Fox; Leon; Louis Gossett Jr.; Paula Jai Parker; Patti LaBelle; Mýa
- Cinematography: Francis Kenny
- Edited by: Cari Coughlin
- Music by: Kurt Farquhar
- Production companies: Duke Media; Redmond Enterprises; Redwood Palms Pictures
- Distributed by: American Cinema International
- Release dates: October 28, 2007 (American Black Film Festival); February 22, 2008 (United States)
- Running time: 98 minutes
- Country: United States
- Language: English
- Box office: $79,436

Cover is a drama thriller film produced and directed by Bill Duke and starring Aunjanue Ellis, Razaaq Adoti, Vivica A. Fox, and Leon. It opened in select theaters on February 22, 2008.

== Plot ==
A woman accused could be either a killer or a victim in this psychological drama from director Bill Duke. Valerie Mass is a God-fearing housewife and artist who one day finds herself in a situation she never imaged possible—being questioned on murder charges by no-nonsense police detective Hicks and Simmons, a district attorney eager to close this case.

As Valerie repeatedly insists she's not a murderer, she tells the story of the last several months of her life. Valerie's husband, Dutch, is a psychiatrist with a practice in Atlanta who was offered a high-paying job by his old friend Monica, who works at a hospital in Philadelphia. Dutch takes the job and Valerie dutifully follows, and she seeks solace in the women's support group at local church.

Dutch spends more and more time with drug-abusing Monica, her wealthy but uninterested husband, Kevin, and obsessively womanizing musician Ryan Chambers. As Valerie's marriage begins to fall apart, she suspects her husband is being unfaithful, but she's shocked to discover the truth is more complicated than she imagined.

== Cast ==
- Aunjanue Ellis as Valerie Mass
- Razaaq Adoti as Dutch Mass
- Vivica A. Fox as Zahara Milton
- Leon Robinson as Ryan Chambers
- Louis Gossett Jr. as Detective Hicks
- Paula Jai Parker as Monica Wilson
- Roger Guenveur Smith as Kevin Wilson
- Richard Gant as Robert Mass
- Mýa as Cynda
- Obba Babatundé as Attorney Miller
- Victoria Gabrielle Platt as Charlotte
- Clifton Davis as D.A. Simmons
- Patti LaBelle as Mrs. Persons
- Clayton Prince as Greg
- Tomorrow Baldwin Montgomery as Nicole Mass
- Kenya Cagle as Detective Partner

== Reception ==
On review aggregator website Metacritic, the film holds 30 out of a 100 based on 5 reviews, indicating "generally unfavorable" reviews.

Peter Debruge of Variety criticized the director Bill Duke for "aims[ing] for social awareness, but deliver[ing] second-rate melodrama instead".
