= Toronto Santa Claus Parade =

Parade in Toronto, Ontario, Canada

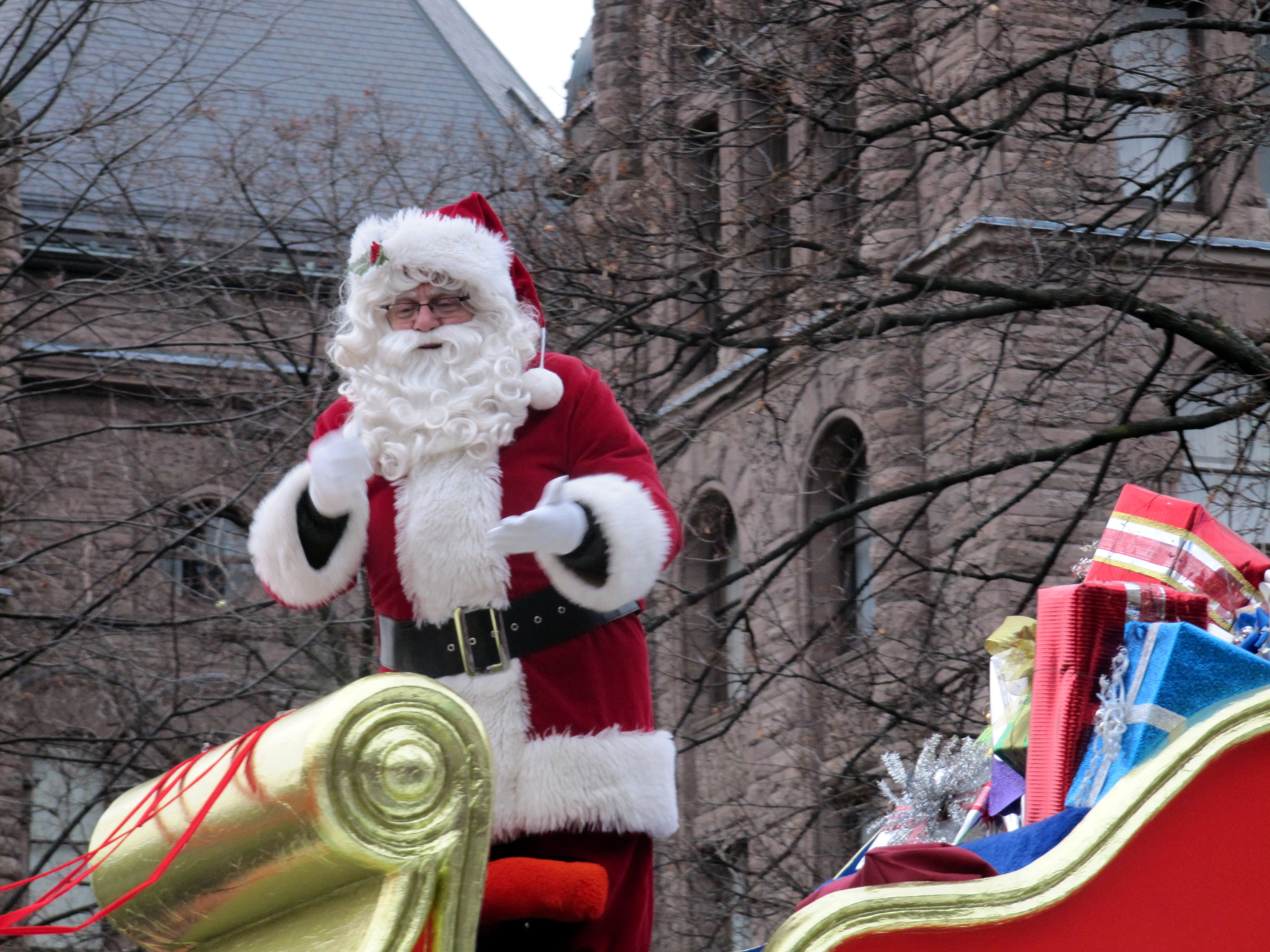
- Santa at the 2010 Toronto Santa Claus Parade
- Status: Active
- Genre: Christmas parade
- Frequency: Annually in November
- Locations: Toronto, Ontario
- Years active: 1905–present
- Website: thesantaclausparade.com

The Toronto Santa Claus Parade, also branded as The Original Santa Claus Parade, is a Santa Claus parade held annually in Toronto, Ontario, Canada.

First held in 1905, it is one of the largest parade productions in North America, the oldest Santa Claus parade in the world, and one of the world's oldest annual parades. Traditionally, it ran from Christie Pits along Bloor Street West and then south through Downtown Toronto before terminating at the downtown Eaton's store (later the Eaton Centre) at Yonge Street and Queen Street. Since Eaton's ceased its sponsorship of the parade in the 1980s, it has instead terminated at St. Lawrence Market. Its current route is almost 6.3 kilometres (3.9 mi) long. By tradition, the parade concludes with the arrival of Santa Claus.

== History ==
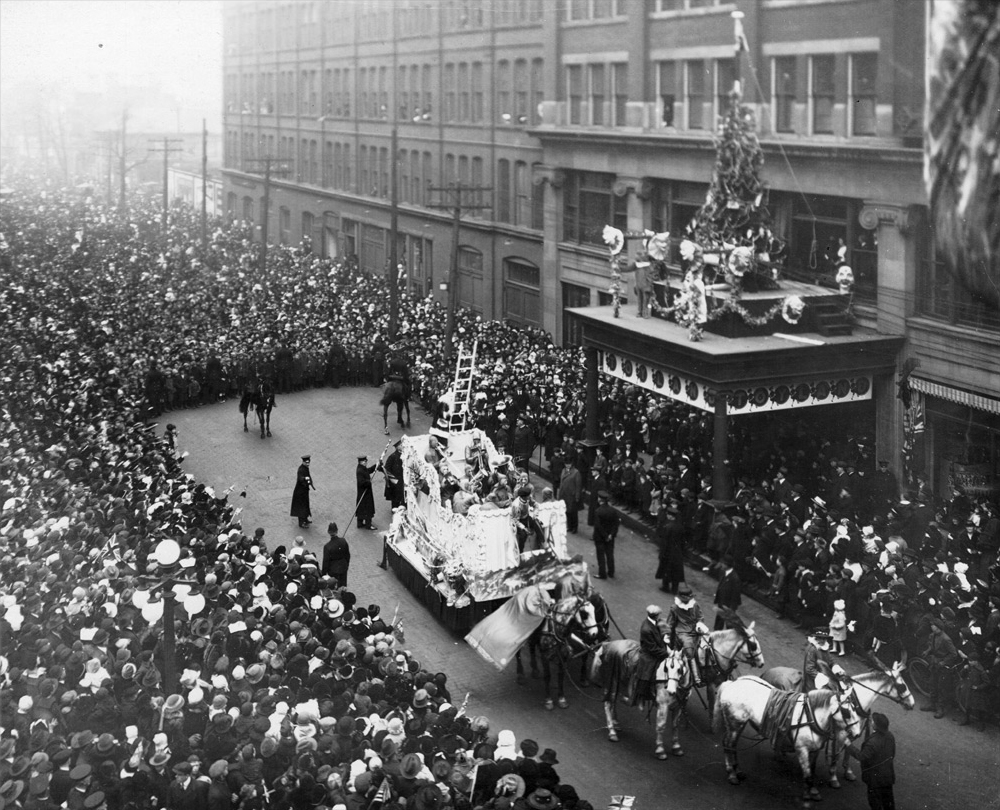
Santa readying his ladder to climb up onto the Eaton's store during the 1918 Santa Claus Parade.

The idea for the parade originated from an earlier promotion by the Eaton's chain of department stores, on 2 December 1904, when Santa walked from Union Station to the downtown Toronto Eaton store on Queen Street. The first official Toronto Santa Claus Parade was first held on December 2, 1905, with a single float. Sponsored by Eaton's, Santa was collected at Union Station, and delivered to the downtown Toronto Eaton's store. The parade grew in size each year and attracted large crowds.

From 1910 to 1912, the parade began its journey in Newmarket on a Friday afternoon, stopping overnight in York Mills and then continuing south along Yonge Street to Eaton's downtown Toronto location on Saturday afternoon.

For the 1913 parade, Eaton's brought in reindeer from Labrador to pull Santa's sleigh. Until 1915, the parade was followed by Santa holding court at Massey Hall where he would meet with up to 5,000 children.

By 1917, the parade featured a number of floats and in 1919, Santa arrived in the city by plane. From 1925 until the late 1960s, the floats from the parade were reused in Montreal where Eaton's had been holding Santa Claus Parades since 1909. The Montreal parade was cancelled in 1969 due to bombing threats by the Front de libération du Québec and did not resume until it was revived in the 1990s by the downtown Montreal business association as Défilé du Père Noël. Eaton's also launched a Santa Claus Parade in Winnipeg, Manitoba, in 1909. Eaton's sold the Winnipeg parade to the Winnipeg Firefighters Club in 1965 and continues as a community parade to this day, but is now operated by the Winnipeg Jaycees.

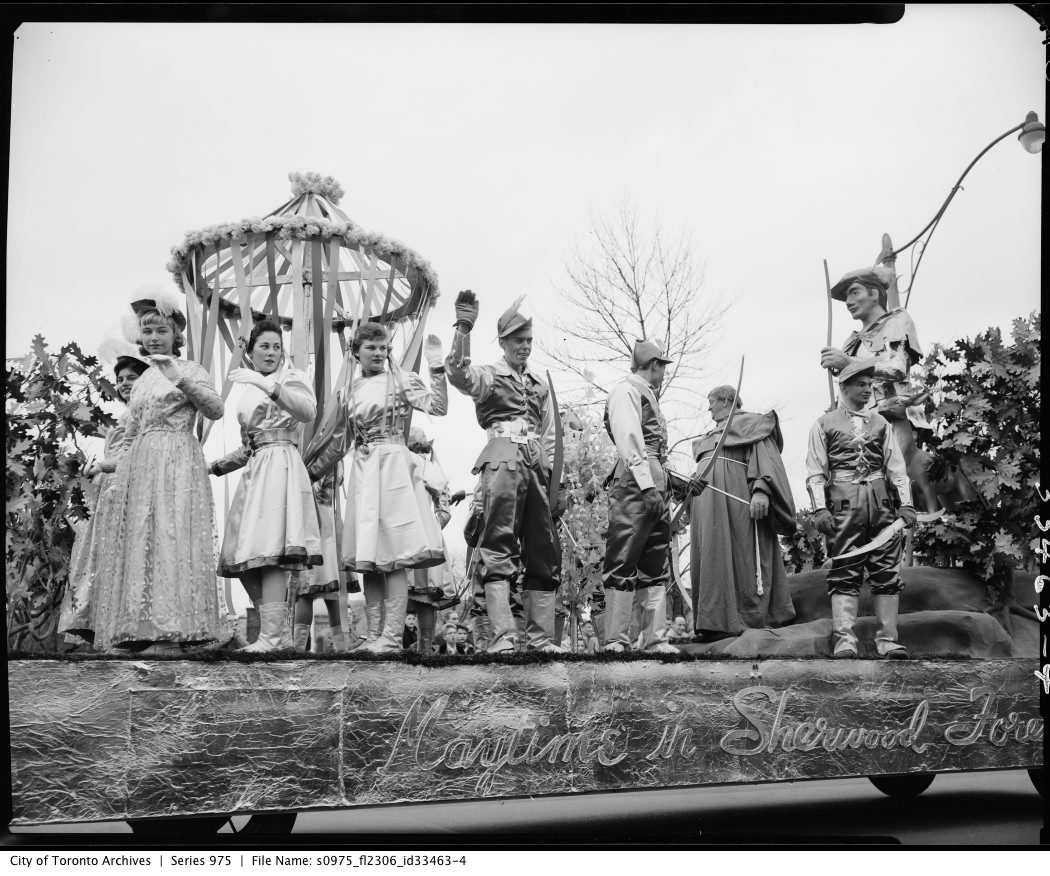
A float in the 1956 parade.

The Toronto parade continued to be held during World War II, without interruption. Due to a shortage of supplies, all of the floats were made out of paper.

Beginning in 1947, a recurring character, Punkinhead, was seen each year in the parade. Punkinhead was a character in a series of storybooks sold by Eaton's. By the 1950s the Toronto parade was the largest Santa Claus parade in North America. Eaton's continued to pay for the parade, which was used to promote its retail business. The company's Merchandise Display Department worked year-round at Eaton's Sheppard and Highway 400 service building to make costumes and build floats and mechanized window tableaux. In 1952, the parade was televised for the first time by CBC Television, and in 1970 the first colour broadcast was aired.

Eaton's association with the parade ended in 1982 and almost led to the parade's demise. Metro Chairman Paul Godfrey spearheaded a "Save Our Parade" campaign, and soon after a group of businessmen led by Ron Barbaro and George Cohon, with the help of 20 corporate sponsors, stepped in to save the parade. Cohon retired from the parade organization in 2014. Since the 1980s, the parade has received funding from various corporate sponsors (including McDonald's, Canadian Tire, Lowe's, The Walt Disney Company, Toys "R" Us Canada, Mattel, and Tim Horton's) which are featured in floats. In 1983, the Celebrity Clowns began and remain a tradition of the parade.

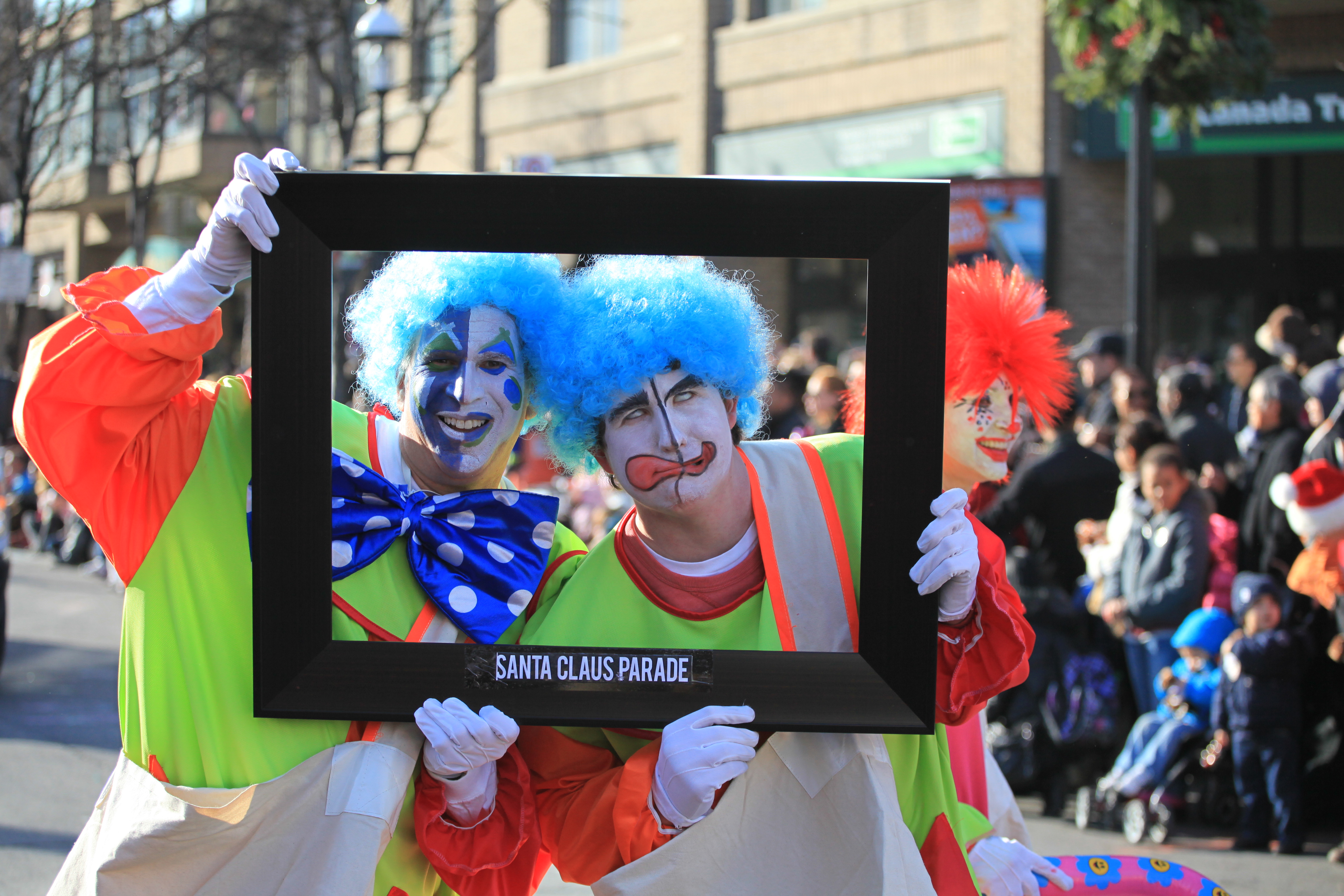
Celebrity Clowns at the 2012 parade.

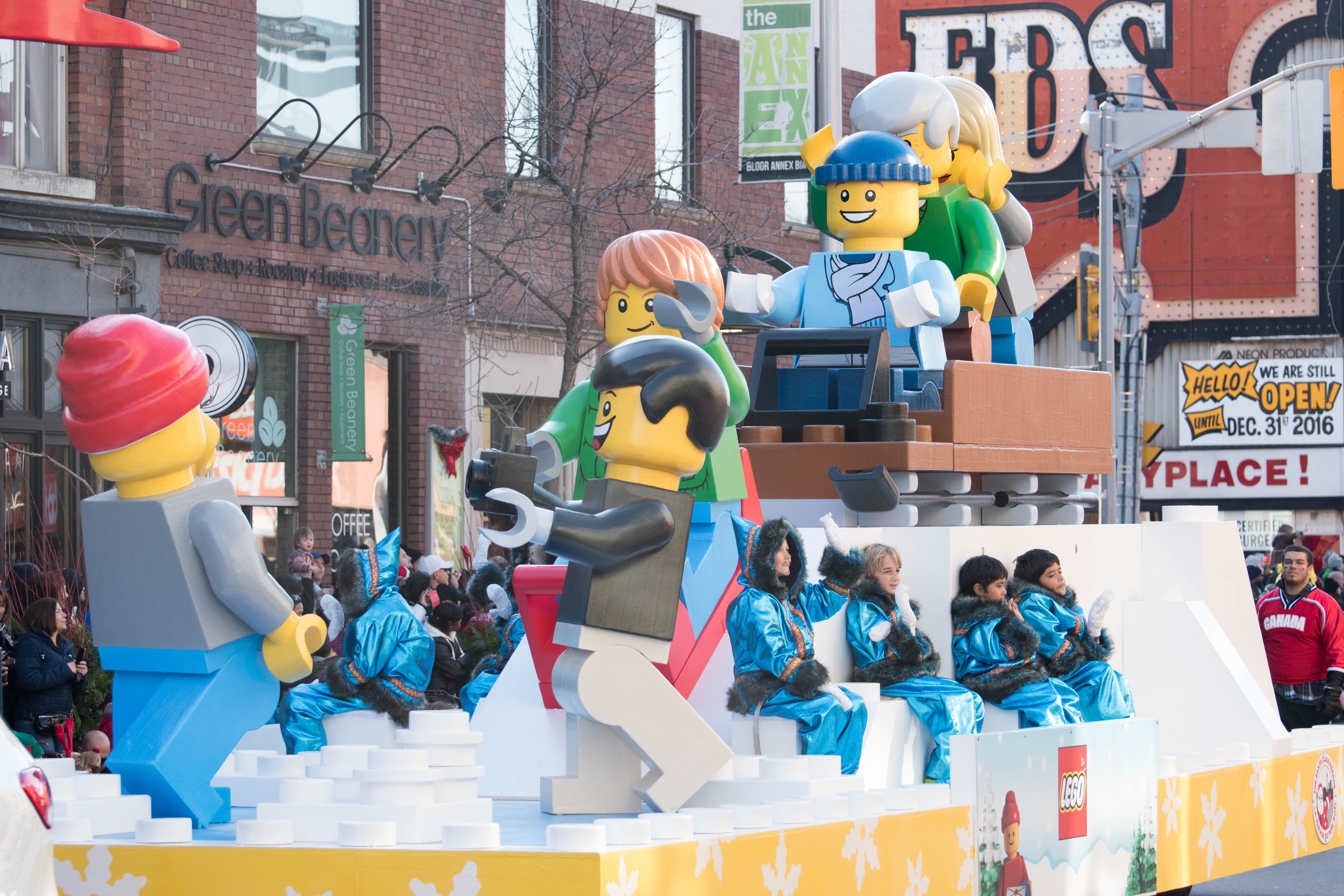
A Lego float at the 2015 parade.

By 2004, the parade was drawing crowds of over half a million. In 2011, the parade route moved its southbound leg from Yonge Street, via Dundas Street West, to Avenue Road, Queen's Park Crescent and University Avenue, concluding at St. Lawrence Market; the change was made in order to provide more space for floats and spectators. In 2019, the route changed to begin from the east end of the city at Bloor and Parliament, owing to construction at its usual starting point.

The 2020 parade was cancelled as a public event due to the COVID-19 pandemic in Toronto. A broadcast-only version of the parade was filmed at Canada's Wonderland in Vaughan. It aired on December 5, 2020, and featured musical performances from Meghan Trainor, Shaggy and Dolly Parton. The 2021 edition of the parade would once again be broadcast-only; organizers stated that it would be logistically difficult to enforce Ontario's COVID-19 vaccine mandate during such a large scale event, and also cited safety concerns due to children under 11 years of age not yet being eligible for COVID-19 vaccines. The parade returned as a public event, with its traditional route, in 2022.

== Funding issues ==
In November 2024, the parade's CEO reported a $250,000 shortfall in the event's 2025 budget and launched a GoFundMe campaign to raise money. Usually, 75 to 85% of the parade's funding comes from corporate sponsorship with the remainder being funded by the provincial government, but an increase in costs and decrease in corporate sponsorship since the COVID-19 pandemic resulted in a projected shortfall. Subsequent to the announcement of the parade's financial difficulties, an initial $75,000 was raised from the public and the city government contributed $100,000 to the event, with Prime Minister Justin Trudeau promising that the federal government would also contribute, which would be the first time all three levels of government provided funding. Parade CEO Clay Charters told CBC News "all of our fundraising right now and our efforts with corporate sponsorship and these conversations we've been having with the various levels of government are all about ensuring that the parade has a foundation from which we can operate into the new year and begin planning."

== Broadcasting ==
From 1952 to 1981, CBC Television broadcast the parade. The parade aired on CFRB radio from the 1930s through the 1950s and then on CBC Radio. CHFI-FM is an official sponsor of the parade and its current radio broadcaster having taken over from CBC Radio in the 1980s. In 1973, the parade received its first French-language television broadcast on Télé-Métropole. The broadcast was hosted by the puppets from the francophone children's series Nic et Pic.

Global carried the parade from 1984 to 2009.

On April 6, 2010, it was announced that CTV had acquired the rights to the parade, with the telecast airing on CTV and CP24. From 2010 until 2023, the parade was streamed live on CP24's website and then broadcast nationally as an early evening special on a tape delayed basis on CTV, in early December.

The 2024 edition of the parade was the first to be streamed live on YouTube. The livestream was anchored by CHFI hosts Pooja Handa and Gurdeep Ahluwalia.

Right to the parade were acquired by Rogers Sports & Media in 2025 with the event airing on Citytv.

=== Foreign coverage ===
In the United States, the Toronto Santa Claus Parade was one of several formerly featured by CBS as part of its All American Thanksgiving Day Parade special, which featured unofficial coverage of the Macy's Thanksgiving Day Parade in New York City, as well as pre-recorded coverage from other major Christmas and Thanksgiving holiday parades in the United States. This aspect has since been dropped, and the special has since only covered the Macy's parade.

The Global Television Network made its feed of the parade available in several other countries, including New Zealand, Ireland and Norway, primarily by broadcasters owned by or affiliated with Global's parent company CanWest between 1984 and 2009. From 1989 to 1991, the parade was also broadcast in the Soviet Union, leading to Russia being invited to participate in the parade in 1991.

== Access and transit closures ==
Streets around the downtown core are closed from approximately 8:00 a.m. through the afternoon of parade day. While some parking is available, organizers encourage viewers to take public transit. GO Transit (via Union Station) and Toronto Transit Commission's subway stations provide access to the parade route.

== See also ==
- List of Christmas and holiday season parades
- Macy's Thanksgiving Day Parade
- Adelaide Christmas Pageant
- 6abc Dunkin' Thanksgiving Day Parade
- America's Thanksgiving Parade
