= Pumpkinhead: Ashes to Ashes =

2006 horror film

- Promotional release poster
- Genre: Horror
- Based on: Pumpkinhead by Ed Justin
- Screenplay by: Jake West; Barbara Werner
- Directed by: Jake West
- Starring: Lance Henriksen; Doug Bradley
- Theme music composer: Rob Lord
- Countries of origin: United Kingdom; Romania; United States; Switzerland
- Original language: English

Production
- Producers: Brad Krevoy; Pierre Spengler; Donald Kushner
- Cinematography: Erik Alexander Wilson
- Editor: Justin Rogers
- Running time: 91 minutes
- Production companies: Sony Pictures Home Entertainment; Sci-Fi Pictures; MPCA; Castel Film Romania; Clubdeal

Original release
- Network: Sci Fi Channel
- Release: 2006

Related
- Pumpkinhead II: Blood Wings (1994); Pumpkinhead: Blood Feud (2007)

Pumpkinhead: Ashes to Ashes is a 2006 made-for-television supernatural horror film and the third installment in the Pumpkinhead film series of horror films. The film is directed by Jake West (Evil Aliens), who co-wrote the screenplay with Barbara Werner. It’s an international co-production between the United Kingdom, Romania, the United States and Switzerland.

== Plot ==
Pumpkinhead: Ashes to Ashes plotline follows more closely to the first film, with townspeople angered over the local mortician stealing and selling the organs of their loved ones and then dumping the corpses in a swamp, rather than cremating them. When the townspeople find out, they have the old witch Haggis summon Pumpkinhead through the mummified body of Ed Harley (played by Lance Henriksen, who reprises his role from the first film). Pumpkinhead then proceeds to go on his killing rampage murdering all those responsible for the desecration, while Doc Frasier (Doug Bradley) hurries to murder those who summoned Pumpkinhead, which will effectively kill the demon in the process.

== Cast ==
- Doug Bradley as Dr. "Doc" Fraser
- Lance Henriksen as Ed Harley
- Lisa McAllister as Dahlia Wallace
- Tess Panzer as Molly Sue Allen
- Emanuel Pârvu as Oliver Allen
- Ioana Ginghina as Ellie Johnson
- Douglas Roberts as Bunt Wallace
- Radu Iacobian as Richie
- Cătălin Paraschiv as Ronnie Johnson
- Dan Astileanu as Sheriff Bullock
- Dicu Aurel as Tiny Wallace
- Iulian Glita as Junior Wallace
- Lynne Verrall as Haggis
- Emil Hoștină as Lenny
- Philip Bowen as Reverend McGee
- Vasilescu Valentin as Deputy Ben
- Bart Sidles as Fred
- Mircea Stoian as Agent Bensen
- Radu Bânzaru as Agent Black

== Production ==
Initially announced as Pumpkinhead 3, it was filmed back-to-back with another sequel titled Pumpkinhead 4 in Bucharest, Romania. The films were renamed Pumpkinhead: Ashes to Ashes and Pumpkinhead: Blood Feud, respectively, before their release.

Lance Henriksen had been asked by the producers of Pumpkinhead II: Blood Wings to return, but Henriksen declined having read the script deeming it "terrible". Henriksen returned to the role of Ed Harley after talking with Ashes to Ashes director Jake West and Blood Feud director Michael Hurst responding positively to their ideas and excited to play Ed Harley as a ghost. In contrast to prior films most of the effects work was done with CGI rather than practical effects.

== Release ==
Pumpkinhead: Ashes to Ashes premiered on SCI FI on October 28, 2006, followed by a home video release on March 27, 2007.

== Reception ==
Ian Jane of DVD Talk rated it 2 out of 5 stars and criticized its "cheap, shoddy filmmaking". Dread Central rated it 2 out of 5 stars and wrote: "Despite the cast and crew's obvious devotion to the original, Ashes to Ashes hits every pitfall in the low-budget realm". Virginia Heffernan of The New York Times called it unmemorable and "rote slasher stuff". In a 2014 interview, Lance Henriksen expressed his disappointment with the film.
