= DNA (1996 film) =

- DVD cover
- Directed by: William Mesa
- Written by: Nick Davis
- Produced by: Patrick D. Choi; Nile Niami; James Lee; William Mesa; Patrick Peach; Eung Pyo Choi; Chung Jin Woo; Paul L. Newman; Interlight
- Starring: Mark Dacascos; Jürgen Prochnow; Robin McKee; Tom Taus
- Cinematography: Gerry Lively
- Edited by: Edward R. Abroms
- Music by: Christopher L. Stone
- Distributed by: Astra Cinema; Cabin Fever Entertainment; Interlight; New City Releasing
- Release date: March 7, 1997
- Running time: 105 minutes
- Countries: United States; Philippines
- Language: English

DNA is a 1996 American science fiction action film starring Mark Dacascos and Jürgen Prochnow, and directed by William Mesa. Filming took place in the Philippines. The film was retitled ADN - La menace for its French DVD release, and Scarabée for its television showing. It is also known as Genetic Code in some areas of Europe and Genosaur (Russian: "Генозавр") in Russia.

The film was influenced by Alien, Indiana Jones, Jurassic Park, Predator and cannibal films.

== Plot ==
Ash Mattley (Mark Dacascos), a doctor in a small village deep in the jungles of Borneo, is approached by another scientist, Carl Wessinger (Jürgen Prochnow) regarding his studies of an enzyme found in a rare beetle. With the aid of Mattley and a group of natives, Wessinger secures several of the beetles, but then betrays his team and leaves them behind in a cave. Later, Wessinger uncovers a fossil in the jungle, but the natives in his new team fall in fear and worship before the deceased creature, which they call "Balacau."

Two years later, Mattley's clinic is beset by a series of gruesome murders in the jungle. The natives attribute the killings to Balacau, who is an ancient myth in the area. Mattley is approached by Claire Sommers (Robin McKee), a CIA agent, who enlists his aid to find Wessinger. Wessinger had been working for the United States government but fallen out of contact, and Sommers reveals she has been sent to track him down. Together with Matzu (Tom Taus), a boy whose sister was one of the victims, they set out into the jungle. Mattley does not initially believe that Balacau is real, but Sommers eventually tells him that the CIA was funding Wessinger's research into the fossil, leading him to change his mind.

Mattley and Sommers eventually reach Wessinger's compound, only to find it abandoned. When they examine the computers in the main lab, they find that Wessinger used the enzyme from the beetles to reanimate Balacau's fossil; Wessinger's records reveal it was an alien creature that terrorized the jungle centuries earlier. He intended to make clones of it for sale to the highest bidder, but it grew hostile and escaped. Balacau returns to the compound and pursues Mattley and Sommers, who end up separated from Matzu but find Wessinger and his assistants in a panic room. The two groups team up to keep the compound's power on and find Matzu. Balacau attacks in the main lab, but the flashing of Sommers's camera and the light from an arriving helicopter frighten it away. A band of mercenaries led by Sergeant Reinhardt (Mark McCracken) that work for Wessinger arrive, ostensibly to aid in recapturing the creature, but instead help Wessinger subdue and imprison Mattley and Sommers. They also decide to use Wessinger's assistant, Azenfeld (Roger Aaron Brown) as bait for the creature, but Mattley and Sommers escape and free him. In the ensuing battle, Azenfeld sacrifices himself to set off a bomb that kills Wessinger, Reinhardt, and most of the mercenaries.

Mattley, Sommers and Matzu escape into the jungle, pursued by both the remaining mercenaries in a second helicopter and Balacau; the creature is able to track them using invisibility and infrared vision. After destroying the helicopter, they are attacked by Balacau, and Matzu is killed when he warns Mattley and Sommers of its presence. Matzu's tribe arrives to give him a burial and prepare Mattley for battle against Balacau. After a series of traps fails to do much damage, Mattley acquires a rocket launcher from Sommers and kills the creature by firing an explosive into its mouth. He and Sommers grow close at the bottom of a waterfall as the natives cheer and CIA rescue helicopters arrive.

== Cast ==
- Mark Dacascos as Ash Mattley, a doctor in the Bornean jungle.
- Jürgen Prochnow as Carl Wessinger, a geneticist.
- Robin McKee as Claire Sommers, a CIA agent sent to hunt down Wessinger.
- Tom Taus as Matzu, a native boy whose sister was killed by Balacau.
- Roger Aaron Brown as Loren Azenfeld, Wessinger's assistant.
- Mark McCracken as Sergeant Reinhardt, a mercenary leader hired by Wessinger.
  - McCracken also portrays Balacau, the alien creature reanimated by Wessinger.
- John H. Brennan as Hatton, a technician on Wessinger's team.
- Joel Torre as Taka
- Cris Aguilar as Kasala
- Aniceto "Chito" Fulminar as Fulminari Chief
- Susan Africa as Nurse

== Release ==
=== Home media ===
The film was released on DVD by Front Row Entertainment on June 25, 2001. In 2005, Platinum Disc released the film three separate times that year, both as single and multi-feature editions.

== Reception ==
Chris Parry from eFilmCritic.com gave the film one out of five stars. In his review, Parry panned the film for its poor writing, and virtual plagiarism of entire scenes from other films; while also writing, "If there's one benefit to watching ... DNA, it's in the realization that special effects technicians, no matter how skilled in that field, should never take part in any other task on a film shoot." TV Guide awarded the film two out of four stars, writing, "While its script comes off as an experiment in plot-splicing, this is an admittedly snappy, occasionally exciting monster movie."
