= Pumpkinhead (film) =

1988 film by Stan Winston

- Theatrical release poster
- Directed by: Stan Winston
- Screenplay by: Mark Patrick Carducci; Gary Gerani
- Story by: Mark Patrick Carducci; Stan Winston; Richard C. Weinman
- Based on: Pumpkinhead by Ed Justin
- Produced by: Bill Blake
- Starring: Lance Henriksen; John D'Aquino; Kerry Remsen
- Cinematography: Bojan Bazelli
- Edited by: Marcus Manton
- Music by: Richard Stone
- Production company: De Laurentiis Entertainment Group
- Distributed by: United Artists; Metro-Goldwyn-Mayer (MGM/UA Communications Co.)
- Release dates: October 14, 1988 (Limited); January 13, 1989
- Running time: 86 minutes
- Country: United States
- Language: English
- Budget: $3.2 million
- Box office: $4.4 million (US)

Pumpkinhead is a 1988 American supernatural horror film. It was the directorial debut of special effects artist Stan Winston. The film has built up a cult following since its release. The first in the Pumpkinhead film series, it was followed by a direct-to-video sequel, two TV film sequels, and a comic book series. The film was originally called Vengeance: The Demon and it was inspired by a poem written by poet Ed Justin. A video game loosely based on the second film was released in 1995 called Bloodwings: Pumpkinhead's Revenge.

Production on a reboot from Paramount Players was announced in 2021.

== Plot ==
In 1957, Tom Harley waits inside his farm cabin with his wife and his son, Ed. A doomed man seeks sanctuary at Tom's cabin, but Tom refuses and threatens to shoot him if he does not leave. Watching through a window, Ed witnesses the man being caught and killed by a monster.

In the present, Ed Harley is a widowed father and owns a small store in the country. He leaves his young son, Billy, alone while he runs an errand. A group of teenage campers stop by at Harley's, and, while riding their dirt bikes, they mortally injure Billy by accident. One teen, Steve, stays with the boy until his father's return; the 'killer' flees the scene with his girlfriend, while the rest leave to find a phone. At their cabin, the campers fight about whether or not to call the police. Joel, Steve's older brother, who is personally responsible for the boy's injury and is on probation for a similar incident, rips out the phone cord, knocks one of his friends unconscious, and locks him and a girl in the closet to stop them from contacting the authorities.

Ed goes to see a witch named Haggis and offers her gold, but she says that she cannot wake the dead. Instead, Ed says that he wants revenge; the witch agrees to help but warns him that vengeance comes with a terrible price. On her orders, Ed goes to an old graveyard in the mountains, digs up a corpse, and brings it back to the witch's home. The witch uses blood from father and son to resurrect the corpse, which rises as a gigantic, spindly demonic monster referred to as "Pumpkinhead" by the locals.

Back at the cabin, Joel begins to experience remorse for his actions and decides to turn himself in to the police. The monster, however, has already arrived. One of the girls, Maggie, hears a voice whispering her name. Seemingly hypnotized, she follows the voice outside the cabin. Steve brings her out of her trance, but Pumpkinhead kills him. Ed experiences the murder through the monster's eyes. While the campers search for Steve, Pumpkinhead drags away Maggie, and Ed again experiences the ensuing murder. He returns to the witch and begs her to stop the monster's actions. The witch, however, tells him that nobody can stop Pumpkinhead, and Ed will die if he interferes with the killing spree.

Joel confronts Pumpkinhead with a machete, but it swats him aside and drags away Kim, whom it drops from a fatal height. The three remaining campers unsuccessfully beg the locals for help. Ed arrives and shoots Pumpkinhead, but when Joel checks to see if the creature is still alive, it grabs a fallen rifle and impales him with it. A local boy, Bunt, helps the two remaining campers, Tracey and Chris, reach an abandoned church in the woods. Bunt relates the legend of the monster Pumpkinhead, explaining that the monster avenges one who was wronged. If anyone tries to stop Pumpkinhead or help his victims, that person becomes marked, too. Chris's dirt bike fails to start after Pumpkinhead removes the drive chain; he lifts up the bike, with Chris still on it, and throws it against a tree. He then drags Chris back to Harley's house, where Tracey, Bunt, and Ed have taken shelter.

Pumpkinhead captures Bunt. Ed stumbles out of the barn but is accidentally stabbed in the arm by a pitchfork. Both Ed and Pumpkinhead cry out in pain, and Pumpkinhead releases Bunt. Ed notices that Pumpkinhead's head is turning more human as Ed himself appears more monstrous, then realizes that he and Pumpkinhead are one; the only way for Ed to kill the monster is to die himself.

Pumpkinhead grabs Tracey by the neck, but before he can kill her, Ed shoots himself in the head. Pumpkinhead momentarily collapses to the ground, then grabs Bunt again. Tracey takes the gun, and Ed begs her to finish him off. Ed, now fully metamorphosed, appears to menace Tracey. She shoots him until both he and Pumpkinhead fall to the ground dead. Tracey, Bunt, and Chris then watch as Pumpkinhead bursts into flames. Later that night, the witch buries Ed in Pumpkinhead's grave, ready to wait for the next person seeking revenge and still wearing the necklace his son Billy made him.

== Cast ==
- Lance Henriksen as Ed Harley, Billy Harley's father, who seeks revenge on a group of six outsiders
- John D'Aquino as Joel, Steve's brother and Kim's boyfriend, who accidentally injures Bill Harley
- Jeff East as Chris, Tracey's Boyfriend
- Kerry Remsen as Maggie, Steve's girlfriend
- Kimberly Ross as Kim, Joel's girlfriend
- Joel Hoffman as Steve "Scratch", Maggie's boyfriend
- Cynthia Bain as Tracey, Chris' girlfriend
- Florence Schauffler as Haggis, an old woman who helps Harley exact his revenge
- Matthew Hurley as Billy Harley, Ed Harley's son who is injured by Joel in an accident
- Buck Flower as Mr. Wallace, Bunt and Christine's father and an acquaintance of Harley
- Brian Bremer as Bunt Wallace, Mr. Wallace's son and Christine's brother, who leads Harley to Haggis' house
- Mayim Bialik as Christine Wallace, one of Bunt's sisters
- Lee DeBroux as Tom Harley, Ed's father
- Peggy Walton-Walker as Ellie Harley, Ed's mother (credited as Peggy Walton Walker)
- Madeleine Taylor Holmes as Old Hill Woman
- Tom Woodruff Jr. as Pumpkinhead
- Dick Warlock as Clayton Heller, the man hunted by Pumpkinhead in the opening (credited as Richard Warlock)
- Mushroom as Gypsy, the Harley's dog

== Production ==
Pumpkinhead was inspired by a poem by Ed Justin. The De Laurentiis Entertainment Group sent Stan Winston the script expecting him to only do the special creature effects, but Winston instead saw in the project an opportunity to make it his directorial debut. While Winston was busy refining the story, he gave free rein regarding design to artists Alec Gillis, Shane Mahan, John Rosengrant and Tom Woodruff Jr., the last of whom also wore the Pumpkinhead suit. Winston's experience regarding creature work enabled the effects not to use too much of the limited $3 million budget. Filming took place in Los Angeles, California.

== Release ==
The film was given a limited release theatrically in the United States by United Artists in October 1988 and again in January 1989. It grossed $4.4 million at the North American domestic box office.

The film was released on VHS in the US by MGM/UA Home Entertainment in May 1989 and again in April 1995. MGM released the film on DVD twice: once in 2000 as a standard edition and again in 2008 in a 20th Anniversary Edition featuring an audio commentary and over an hour of featurettes. It was released on Blu-ray by Scream Factory in September 2014. In October 2023, Scream Factory released a 4K Ultra HD Blu-ray of the film.

== Reception ==
On review aggregator Rotten Tomatoes, Pumpkinhead holds an approval rating of 50%, based on 56 reviews. Its consensus reads: "With effects work and solid direction from Stan Winston—and Lance Henriksen adding welcome gravitas—Pumpkinhead is a creature feature that stands a cut above".

Dave Kehr of the Chicago Tribune wrote: "As a technician, Winston clearly knows how to make a monster, but as a director he's yet to learn how to bring one to life". Richard Harrington of The Washington Post wrote that the film has poor writing and acting, but it is surprisingly polished for a B movie. Chris Willman of the Los Angeles Times wrote that, despite its poor writing, the premise is interesting, but it's not executed as well as Forbidden Planet. Empire rated it 2/5 stars and called it a Friday the 13th clone with "little atmosphere and no surprises". TV Guide rated it 2/5 stars and wrote that the film's second half becomes tedious because of its overdone slasher formula.

In a 1992 retrospective, Jon Nalick of the Los Angeles Times described it as "a well-executed film in a genre that is littered with dimwitted slasher flicks". Bloody Disgusting rated the film 4/5 stars and called it "a gothic story of love, loss, vengeance, and redemption". Joshua Siebalt of Dread Central rated the film 4/5 stars and wrote that film "stands as a timeless, dark fairy tale". Reviewing the 2000 DVD release, G. Noel Gross of DVD Talk rated it 3.5/5 stars and wrote that the film is "too good to pass over", despite its lackluster presentation. Nick Nunziata also criticized the 2000 DVD release and wrote that the film does not hold up. Nick Schager of The A.V. Club called it an endearing pulp film that lacks subtlety. Reviewing the film on Blu-ray, Ken Hanley of Starlog said it is "one hell of an impressive directorial debut". Writing in Horror Films of the 1980s, critic John Kenneth Muir called it "a meditation on vengeance" that is "surprising and rewarding" for its rejection of vigilante justice, a popular theme in the 1980s.

== Legacy ==
Despite being a box office disappointment, Pumpkinhead has become a cult film. In 2013, Tyler Doupe included Pumpkinhead in his list of Underrated Horror Killers at Fearnet, and Fangoria included it in their 101 Best Horror Movies You've Never Seen.

=== Franchise ===
A sequel, Pumpkinhead II: Blood Wings, was released directly to video in 1994. It was directed by Jeff Burr. Two additional sequels, Pumpkinhead: Ashes to Ashes and Pumpkinhead: Blood Feud, were filmed in 2006 as made for television movies. They were broadcast on Syfy in October 2006 and in February 2007, respectively.

A reboot of the series has been reported to be in development and was to be produced by Saw executive producer Peter Block. Nate Atkins was set to write the script for the reboot. By November 2021, a reboot was in the works at Paramount Players, with a script ready and that a director would be announced "in the coming months". As of 2026, a director has not been announced and there have been no updates to the film since 2021, but no plans for cancellation have yet been announced.

=== Comic book ===
In 1993, Dark Horse Comics published a Pumpkinhead comic book series called Pumpkinhead: The Rites of Exorcism. The comic was supposed to be a four-part mini-series but only two issues were published. The second one ended in a cliffhanger leaving readers with the prospect of a winged Pumpkinhead that would have appeared in the third issue.

Dynamite Entertainment began publishing a five issue Pumpkinhead limited series, written by Cullen Bunn and illustrated by Blacky Shepherd, in February 2018.

=== Video game ===
In 1995, Electronic Arts published a first-person shooter computer game for Microsoft Windows called Bloodwings: Pumpkinhead's Revenge. The game was poorly received.

=== Model kits ===
In 1991, GEOmetric Design, Inc. produced and marketed the first licensed Pumpkinhead model kit. It featured the demon on a display base depicting a portion of a burned out church. The model kit was sculpted by American artist Randy Bowen. The kit was discontinued when GEOmetric Design released its "Pumpkinhead: The Metamorphosis" kit in 1994. Sculpted by Japanese artist Takayuki Takeya (竹谷 隆之), the second kit was based on the Pumpkinhead sequel story written by Carducci and Gerani and published in the Dark Horse Comics series. The kit included a glossy, full-color booklet that concluded the canceled comic.

In 2005, Sideshow Collectibles released a Pumpkinhead maquette.

=== Music ===
The horror punk band The Misfits released a song entitled "Pumpkin Head", which was featured on their album Famous Monsters, released in 1999.

== See also ==
- List of monster movies
- List of horror film villains
