= Rob Lord (musician) =

British composer (born 1966)

Rob Lord (born 1966) is a British film and television composer working primarily between the UK and the US.

== Filmography ==
Title	Company	Notes
Apartment 12	Six Feet Under Films	Theme song Down Down Down by Lord.
Slipstream	MPCA	Full score.
Pumpkinhead 3 Ashes To Ashes	MPCA	Full Score.
Pumpkinhead 4 Blood Feud	MPCA	Full score.
The Fallow Field	Industryworks Pictures	Original music.
Writer’s Retreat	Moli Films	Full score And songs.
Dance Camp	Awesomeness Pictures	Score.
Troop Zero	Amazon Studios	Full Score and songs.
I Am Durán	Universal Pictures	Full Score.
