= Florence Attwood =

English toy designer

Florence May Attwood
- Born: 24 July 1907; Shropshire, England
- Died: 7 April 1952 (aged 44); Shropshire, England
- Education: Royal Residential Schools for the Deaf, Manchester
- Occupation(s): Designer, toy maker
- Employer: Merrythought

Florence Attwood (24 July 1907 – 7 April 1952) was an English toy designer and maker who became chief designer at toy manufacturer Merrythought, producing the company's first range of toys. Attwood was responsible for some of the company's most iconic designs, including the signature Merrythought bear. Deaf from the age of two, she has since been remembered as an inspirational and pioneering figure, who "overcame many challenges" to forge a successful design career.

== Life ==
Florence May Attwood was born on 24 July 1907, the daughter of Walter Attwood and Sarah Ann (née Willetts). At the age of two, she contracted measles, which caused her to become deaf. She attended a school for the deaf in Manchester, where she studied design. Attwood was particularly skilled at design and dressmaking, moving into fabric design and pattern making. She worked first for the Chad Valley Toy Company, before being recruited to work for Merrythought, in Ironbridge, Shropshire.

There, she was appointed chief designer. The company's first catalogue came out in 1931, showcasing Attwood's designs. Merrythought's website described Attwood's collection as "an imaginative range of 32 soft toys which included animals, play toys and dolls, alongside the original teddy bear." A second catalogue was released the following year.

Attwood's designs became well known worldwide, and increasingly collectable. Attwood was the designer of the iconic Merrythought bear, as well as "Punkinhead", which was produced by Merrythought exclusively for Eaton's department store in Canada. Attwood was responsible for most of Merrythought's designs up to 1949.

Alongside her career at Merrythought, Attwood maintained close ties with the deaf community, regularly attending Shrewsbury Deaf Club.

In 1952, at 44, Attwood died from cancer.

== Legacy ==
In 2010, as part of the Deaf History series, the British Sign Language Broadcasting Trust created a short documentary about Florence Attwood.

In 2017, a replica of Attwood's original Merrythought Bear was recreated using original patterns held in the company's archives. The bear was commemorated as part of the Royal Mail’s Classic Toys stamp series, one of eight collectable stamps.

In 2018, some of Attwood's designs were featured as part of an Antiques Roadshow special episode on pioneering women. On the episode, Attwood's great-niece spoke about her life and legacy.

Attwood is remembered as a key figure in the history of Merrythought, whose website states:

The first collection [of Merrythought toys] was designed by Florence Attwood, a remarkable pattern maker who overcame many challenges associated with being deaf and unable to speak, to create some of our most iconic designs. This included the original Merrythought and Magnet teddy bears, which still have a strong influence upon the designs we create today.
