= Pumpkinhead II: Blood Wings =

- Promotional release poster
- Directed by: Jeff Burr
- Written by: Constantine Chachornia; Ivan Chachornia
- Produced by: Brad Krevoy
- Starring: Andrew Robinson; Ami Dolenz; Soleil Moon Frye; J. Trevor Edmond; Hill Harper; Alexander Polinsky; Linnea Quigley; Mark McCracken; Steve Kanaly; Roger Clinton Jr.
- Cinematography: Bill Dill
- Edited by: Lauren A. Schaffer
- Music by: Jim Manzie
- Production company: Motion Picture Corporation of America
- Distributed by: Live Entertainment; Motion Picture Corporation of America
- Release dates: October 1993 (Italy); October 19, 1994 (United States)
- Running time: 88 minutes
- Country: United States
- Language: English

Pumpkinhead II: Blood Wings is a 1993 American supernatural horror film and a sequel to the 1988 horror film Pumpkinhead. In this film, thrill-seeking teens resurrect a demon and come to regret it. The film is loosely connected to others in the series and was released in some territories under the title Pumpkinhead: The Demon Returns. The PC video game Bloodwings: Pumpkinhead's Revenge was released shortly after the film.

== Plot ==
In 1958 in Ferren Woods, a small backwater town, an old blind witch, Ms. Osie, feeds a deformed orphan named Tommy; he is the offspring of Pumpkinhead. As Tommy eats, a car of six thugs pull up and notice him. Convinced that he is some demonic monster, they chase him with switchblade knives and baseball bats; eventually, they corner him at an old iron mine, where they bludgeon him, slash him, and drop him down into the mine, deliberately killing him.

In 1993 (thirty-five years later), Sheriff Sean Braddock (who was friends with Tommy before his murder), his wife, and his daughter Jenny have come into town. Sean grew up in Ferren Woods and returned when offered a job as the local sheriff. Jenny has often gotten herself into a lot of trouble with the law, especially with her father, who was once a police officer.

At school, Jenny meets a group of wild kids, one of whom is Daniel "Danny" Dixon, whose dad was one of the greasers who had taken part in Tommy's murder 35 years ago and has since become the town judge. The teens sneak off one night and pilfer Sean's car. Danny inadvertently hits Ms. Osie, and when they go to her cabin to check on her, they find a spellbook and vials of blood, which she is planning to use to resurrect Tommy. After Ms. Osie catches them, she orders them out. Danny knocks her down and escapes with a vial of blood.

Danny and his friends attempt to resurrect Tommy's corpse. Jenny notices Ms. Osie's cabin on fire and Danny and his friends flee. Ms. Osie is badly burnt and ends up in the hospital. Unbeknownst to Danny and his friends, the spell they'd attempted worked, resurrecting Tommy in the form of Pumpkinhead. Soon, Judge Dixon's friends begin to meet grisly deaths.

Jenny's father investigates and begins to come to terms with the fact that Tommy is responsible for the murders. Ms. Osie dies, but not before revealing to Sean some clues. Sean discovers the connection between the victims and Pumpkinhead, realizing that the judge is next.

Judge Dixon calls his posse to assist him in killing whatever is murdering his friends. Before they can arrive however, Pumpkinhead brutally murders Judge Dixon, the leader of the Red Wings and the one who commanded his murder. Now that Tommy has avenged his own death, he begins going after Danny and his friends (for fleeing instead of helping Ms. Osie). Sean and the town doctor go into the woods to find Jenny. By this time, Pumpkinhead (Tommy) has murdered Danny and his three friends.

He then chases Jenny to the iron mine. Since Sean had saved his life years earlier as a boy, and because Jenny was innocent of hurting Ms. Osie, Tommy allows Jenny to step down to her father safe and sound. However, the judge's posse arrives and shoots Tommy back into the mine, where he had died thirty-five years earlier. Jenny later apologizes to her father for all the trouble she caused. Just then, Sean finds an old toy fire truck near the mineshaft that he gave to Tommy as a gift for saving his life.

== Cast ==
- Andrew Robinson as Sheriff Sean Braddock
  - Barry Davis as Young Sean Braddock
- Ami Dolenz as Jenny Braddock
- Soleil Moon Frye as Marcie
- J. Trevor Edmond as Danny Dixon
- Hill Harper as Peter
- Alexander Polinsky as Paul
- Michael J. Carra as Cory
- Linnea Quigley as Nadine
- Mark McCracken as Pumpkinhead
- Steve Kanaly as Judge Caspar Dixon
  - John Gatins as Young Caspar Dixon
- Gloria Hendry as Dr. Delilah Pettibone
- Lilyan Chauvin as Miss Osie
- Caren Kaye as Beth Braddock
- Jean-Paul Manoux as Tommy
- Roger Clinton Jr. as Mayor Bubba
- Joe Unger as Ernst
- R. A. Mihailoff as "Red" Byers
- Kane Hodder as Keith Knox
- Will Huston as Brian Knox
- Chuck Aronberg as Fred Knox
- Nicole Maggio as The Mute Knox Girl
- Mike Johnson as The Coroner
- Robert Harvey as Henchman #2
- Michael Mandaville as Grizzled Man #1

== Production ==
Lance Henriksen had been asked by the producers to return, but he declined after reading the script and finding it "terrible". Tony Randel had initially been slated to direct, but after delays had to step down due to commitments to another film. Jeff Burr had been offered the position of director earlier but turned it down due to commitments to Puppet Master 4, but after Randel left Burr was available and accepted. Burr stated that he wasn't a fan of the first Pumpkinhead but said that he really liked the titular monster and the surrounding atmosphere which enticed him to work on the project. The film was produced concurrently with tie-in video game Bloodwings: Pumpkinhead's Revenge per the desires of producer Jed Weintraub with the sets, actors, and props shared between the two productions. Burr said shooting for both the film and video game were hectic due to the tight production schedule and budget, but ultimately felt the cast and crew pulled it off.

== Release ==
The film was released at the MIFED festival in Italy in October 1993 and direct-to-video on October 19, 1994 in the United States, in addition to being released shortly thereafter in various countries around the world.

The film was first released on DVD by Lionsgate in 2005. A Blu-ray release by Scream Factory (a sub-label of Shout! Factory), under license from current rights holder MGM, was released on October 28, 2014.

== Reception ==
On the review aggregator website Rotten Tomatoes, 13% of 8 critics' reviews are positive, with an average rating of 4.0/10.

Scott Weinberg of DVD Talk rated it 3 out of 5 stars and wrote that the sequel "holds up pretty darn well". David Johnson of DVD Verdict called it a "fairly entertaining" sequel that doesn't take itself seriously.

== Video game ==
A video game adaptation, Bloodwings: Pumpkinhead's Revenge, was released for MS-DOS in 1995. The game sold poorly and received little attention.

== Sequel ==
The film was followed by two sequels, Pumpkinhead: Ashes to Ashes and Pumpkinhead: Blood Feud. Both made-for-TV films do not reference the events of Blood Wings.
