= Punkinhead =

Brand of toy bear

Punkinhead, "the sad little bear", was a rubbery toy bear with a tuft of unruly orange hair. He was designed and developed into a storybook character by Canadian cartoonist Charles Thorson. The bears were manufactured by Merrythought company.

Punkinhead was created by the T. Eaton Company, who were hoping to emulate the success Montgomery Ward had with Rudolph the Red-Nosed Reindeer. Once the Eaton's marketing department had developed the initial concept, Thorson was commissioned to flesh out the idea. Thorson chose the name 'Punkinhead' as it was his nickname for his son.

In 1947, Punkinhead made his debut in the Toronto Santa Claus Parade. As Eaton's had been the longtime sponsor of the parade, Punkinhead was quickly declared the parade's mascot. When cheers for Punkinhead got as loud as the cheers for Santa, Punkinhead soon got to ride in Santa's sleigh alongside Santa Claus. Punkinhead's popularity began to wane by the early-1960s, but Punkinhead remained the parade's mascot until Eaton's ended their involvement with the parade in 1982.

Punkinhead became a fixture of Eaton's Christmas advertising. The character also appeared on many of Eaton's toys, accessories and clothing. Among them were kitchenware items such as bowls and mugs, furniture such as chairs and rocking horses, and clothing such as toques and mittens.

Punkinhead had a song written about him and Eaton's sold recordings of it. Wilf Carter even recorded a version for his Christmas album.

Eaton's briefly resurrected the character in 1992, hoping to play on nostalgia.

The Punkinhead doll and books have become collector's items.

== Books ==
The storybooks were a key part of the Punkinhead merchandising push, with children being given a free copy when they visited Santa at Eaton's.

- Punkinhead, the Sad Little Bear, 1948
- Punkinhead and the Snow Fairy,, 1949
- Punkinhead in Santa's Workshop, 1950
- Punkinhead and the Magic Wishes, 1951
- Punkinhead and the Christmas Party, 1952
- How Punkinhead Came to Toyland, 1953
- Punkinhead and His Toy Workshop Adventure, 1954
- Punkinhead in Animal Valley, 1955
- Punkinhead and the Clock that Fell Asleep, 1956
- Punkinhead and the Christmas Skates, 1957
- Punkinhead and the Little Princess, 1958
- Punkinhead and the Lollipop Man, 1959
- Punkinhead and Jock the Jumper, 1960
