= Motion Picture Corporation of America =

American film production company

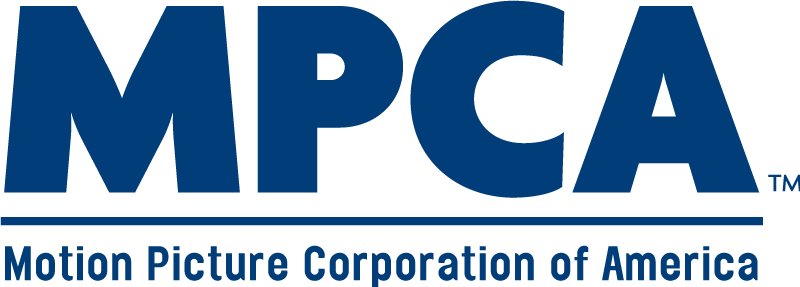
- Logo used since 2011
- Type: Private
- Industry: Entertainment
- Founded: 1986; 40 years ago
- Founders: Brad Krevoy; Steve Stabler
- Headquarters: Century City, Los Angeles, California, United States
- Key people: Brad Krevoy
- Products: Low-budget films
- Parent: Metromedia (1996–1997); Metro-Goldwyn-Mayer (1997–1998)
- Website: mpcafilm.com

Motion Picture Corporation of America (MPCA) is an American independent production company and distributor, founded by Brad Krevoy and Steve Stabler in 1986, specializing in the production, acquisition and distribution of low-budget films.

== History ==
MPCA was founded in 1986 by longtime business partners, Brad Krevoy and Steve Stabler. During the company's formative years, they produced films such as; Purple People Eater (1988) with Ned Beatty; Back to Back (1989), starring Bill Paxton and Apollonia Kotero; and the sex comedy Miracle Beach (1992).

=== Dumb and Dumber ===
Having been rejected by each major film studio, Bobby and Peter Farrelly pitched the script of Dumb and Dumber to MPCA, which released it in 1994.

Dumb and Dumber opened and remained at number 1 on the U.S. box office for 4 weeks. The film went on to gross $127 million domestically and $120 million overseas for a worldwide total of $247 million, with just a $16 million budget. The film was one of the highest grossing comedies of the '90s. Combined with its ancillary and video sales, the film is estimated to have grossed over half a billion dollars.

The success of Dumb and Dumber helped get the Farrellys' passion project, Kingpin, off the ground. It was released in July 1996, starring Woody Harrelson, Randy Quaid, and Bill Murray. The movie was a commercial disappointment, grossing only $27 million against a $25 million budget over the course of its theatrical run, although it did receive critical praise. Roger Ebert and gave it 3 1/2 stars out 4, praising the film's daring comedy. Kingpin became a cult film when released to home video.

MPCA went on to produce more big-budget studio comedies, including Beverly Hills Ninja starring Chris Farley and Jungle 2 Jungle with Tim Allen. It also produced the autobiographical comedy Threesome, written and directed by Andrew Fleming, and starring Lara Flynn Boyle, and Stephen Baldwin. The film grossed just under $15 million domestically. Roger Ebert gave the film three out of four stars, praising the film's honest characterization and strong dialogue.

=== Acquisition by Orion ===
Prior to its acquisition by Metromedia International Group, MPCA had a first-look producing deal with Paramount Pictures in November 1995. A first-look deal with Sony Pictures in the late 1990s resulted in more than 10 productions for the studio.

In 1996, MPCA was purchased by John Kluge's Metromedia International Group. Metromedia had just purchased the independent production company Orion Pictures out of Chapter 11 bankruptcy. When MPCA was merged into the company, Krevoy and Stabler took over as co-presidents of Orion Pictures and were given a six-picture deal.

At Orion, Krevoy and Stabler oversaw the production, acquisition, and distribution of Orion's motion picture and television programming. They produced films for Academy Award-winner Tom Schulman (Dead Poets Society) and released films such as 1997's Academy Award and Golden Globe nominee for Best Foreign Language Film, Prisoner of the Mountains (directed by Sergei Bodrov); and the acclaimed Ulee's Gold (directed by Victor Nunez and presented by Jonathan Demme). Ulee's Gold was a critical hit and won Peter Fonda his first and only Golden Globe for Best Actor. Fonda also received his first and only Oscar nomination for Best Actor.

After two years of ownership, Metromedia sold Orion Pictures to Metro-Goldwyn-Mayer (MGM). Krevoy was able to take the MPCA name back as part of his original deal.

=== Independent company ===
In 1998, MPCA returned to being an independent company, producing films such as Joe and Max, Bookies, and Boat Trip, starring Cuba Gooding Jr., Horatio Sanz, Vivica A. Fox, and Roger Moore for Artisan Entertainment and Lionsgate.

In 2004 MPCA produced the drama A Love Song for Bobby Long, starring John Travolta and Scarlett Johansson. The film was well received by audiences and critics, with Roger Ebert awarding it 3 out of 4 stars. The film also earned Scarlett Johansson a Golden Globe nomination.

MPCA produced the 2009 war drama Taking Chance, based on the true experiences of Lt. Colonel Michael Strobl, who wrote about his time in the article "Taking Chance Home". The film was directed by Ross Katz and starred Kevin Bacon and screened at the Sundance Film Festival before premiering on HBO. Mary McNamara of the Los Angeles Times wrote that the film "doesn't miss a single emotional pressure point – Katz clearly believes in the power and necessity of catharsis." Taking Chance received a total of 27 award nominations, winning 6, including one for Kevin Bacon for Best Performance by an Actor in a Miniseries or a Motion Picture Made for Television. The film was also nominated for a string of Primetime Emmy awards, as well as nominations in the SAG, PGA, DGA, ACE, ASC, and WGA awards. It also won the Humanitas Prize.

MPCA has produced a string of straight-to-DVD action movies, with four including Cuba Gooding Jr. These included Linewatch (2008); Hardwired (2009), which also starred Val Kilmer; Ticking Clock (2011); and One in the Chamber (2012), which also featured 80's action star, Dolph Lundgren. It produced two movies with Samuel L. Jackson: Arena (2011) and Meeting Evil (2012), and with action star Jean-Claude Van Damme: Assassination Games (2011); and Six Bullets (2012).

In 2011, MPCA made Beverly Hills Chihuahua 2 for Disney, a sequel to the 2008 comedy Beverly Hills Chihuahua. Most of the original cast returned, and the film did well in the home video market with sales of over $30 million.

Since 2013, MPCA has produced made-for-television Christmas films for Netflix and the Hallmark Channel.

== Awards and nominations ==
=== Academy Awards ===
| Year | Film | Category | Recipient(s) | Result |
|---|---|---|---|---|
| 1997 | Prisoner of the Mountains | Best Foreign Language Film | Sergey Bodrov, Carolyn Cavallero, Boris Giller, and Eduard Krapivsky | Nominated |
| 1998 | Ulee's Gold | Best Actor | Peter Fonda | Nominated |

=== Golden Globes ===
| Year | Film | Category | Recipient(s) | Result |
|---|---|---|---|---|
| 2000 | Annie | Best Supporting Actress – TV | Kathy Bates | Nominated |
| 2010 | Taking Chance | Best Actor – Miniseries or Television Film | Kevin Bacon | Won |
| 2010 | Taking Chance | Best Limited or Anthology Series or Television Film | Fred Berger, Lori Keith Douglas, Ross Katz, Brad Krevoy, Frank Schaeffer, William Teitler, and Cathy Wischner-Sola | Nominated |

=== Primetime Emmy Awards ===
| Year | Film | Category | Recipient(s) | Result |
|---|---|---|---|---|
| 2009 | Taking Chance | Outstanding Single-Camera Picture Editing for a Miniseries or Movie | Lee Percy and Brian A. Kates | Won |
| 2009 | Taking Chance | Outstanding Directing for a Miniseries or Movie | Ross Katz | Nominated |
| 2009 | Taking Chance | Outstanding Main Title Design | Michael Riley, Dan Meehan, and Bob Swensen | Nominated |
| 2009 | Taking Chance | Outstanding Music Composition for a Miniseries, Movie or Special | Marcelo Zarvos | Nominated |
| 2009 | Taking Chance | Outstanding Lead Actor in a Miniseries or Movie | Kevin Bacon | Nominated |
| 2009 | Taking Chance | Outstanding Television Movie | Brad Krevoy, Cathy Wischner-Sola, Ross Katz, William Teitler, and Lori Keith Douglas | Nominated |
| 2009 | Taking Chance | Outstanding Sound Mixing for a Miniseries or Movie | T.J. O'Mara and Rick Ash | Nominated |
| 2009 | Taking Chance | Outstanding Writing for a Miniseries or Movie | Michael Strobl and Ross Katz | Nominated |
| 2009 | Taking Chance | Outstanding Art Direction for a Miniseries or Movie | Dan Leigh, James Donahue, Ron von Blomberg, and HBO | Nominated |
| 2009 | Taking Chance | Outstanding Sound Editing for a Miniseries, Movie or Special | Frank Gaeta, Rickley W. Dumm, David Grant, Tim Boggs, Johnny Caruso, Catherine Harper, Christopher Moriana, and HBO | Nominated |

| Year | Film | Category | Recipient(s) | Result |
|---|---|---|---|---|
| 2000 | Annie | Outstanding Choreography | Rob Marshall | Won |
| 2000 | Annie | Outstanding Music Direction | Paul Bogaev | Won |
| 2000 | Annie | Outstanding Art Direction for a Miniseries or Movie | Stephen Hendrickson, Edward L. Rubin, and Archie D'Amico | Nominated |
| 2000 | Annie | Outstanding Casting for a Miniseries, Movie or a Special | Marcia Turner, Rosalie Joseph, and Valorie Massalas | Nominated |
| 2000 | Annie | Outstanding Cinematography for a Miniseries or Movie | Ralf D. Bode | Nominated |
| 2000 | Annie | Outstanding Costumes for a Miniseries, Movie or a Special | Shay Cunliffe and Patricia McLaughlin | Nominated |
| 2000 | Annie | Outstanding Directing for a Miniseries or Movie | Rob Marshall | Nominated |
| 2000 | Annie | Outstanding Single-Camera Picture Editing for a Miniseries or a Movie | Scott Vickrey | Nominated |
| 2000 | Annie | Outstanding Hairstyling for a Miniseries or a Movie | Matthew Kasten, Mishell Chandler, and Natasha Ladek | Nominated |
| 2000 | Annie | Outstanding Supporting Actress in a Miniseries or Movie | Kathy Bates | Nominated |
| 2000 | Annie | Outstanding Television Movie | Craig Zadan, Neil Meron, Chris Montan, Marykay Powell, and John Whitman | Nominated |
| 2000 | Annie | Outstanding Sound Mixing for a Miniseries or a Movie | Edward L. Moskowitz, Terry O'Bright, and Keith Rogers | Nominated |

== Filmography ==
=== Films ===
- Sweet Revenge (1987)
- Dangerous Love (1988)
- Purple People Eater (1988)
- Memorial Valley Massacre (1989)
- Think Big (1989)
- Ministry of Vengeance (1989)
- Back to Back (1989)
- Hangfire (1991)
- Trabbi Goes to Hollywood (1991)
- Double Trouble (1992)
- Miracle Beach (1992)
- Ghost Brigade (1993)
- Pumpkinhead II: Blood Wings (1993) (Direct-to-Video)
- Threesome (1994)
- Every Breath (1994)
- The Desperate Trail (1994) (Direct-to-Video)
- Dumb and Dumber (1994)
- Coldblooded (1995)
- Till the End of the Night (1995)
- Cover Me (1995)
- Soldier Boyz (1995)
- Bio-Dome (1996)
- If Lucy Fell (1996)
- Kingpin (1996)
- The War at Home (1996)
- Albino Alligator (1996)
- The Glass Cage (1996)
- Prisoner of the Mountains (1996)
- Retroactive (1997)
- Beverly Hills Ninja (1997)
- Jungle 2 Jungle (1997)
- Behind Enemy Lines (1997)
- 8 Heads in a Duffel Bag (1997)
- Ulee's Gold (1997)
- Midnight Blue (1997)
- The Corporate Ladder (1997)
- The Locusts (1997)
- Gang Related (1997)
- Best Men (1997)
- True Heart (1997)
- The Curse of Inferno (1997)
- Tactical Assault (1998) (Direct-to-Video)
- Overnight Delivery (1998) (Direct-to-Video)
- Music from Another Room (1998)
- American Dragons (1998)
- The Suburbans (1999)
- 3 Strikes (2000)
- A Rumor of Angels (2000)
- The Breed (2001)
- Undisputed (2002)
- Boat Trip (2002)
- Bookies (2003)
- National Lampoon's Barely Legal (2003)
- Dumb and Dumberer: When Harry Met Lloyd (2003)
- Consequence (2003)
- Dracula 3000 (2004)
- A Love Song for Bobby Long (2004)
- Riding the Bullet (2004)
- Blast (2004)
- Slipstream (2005)
- Second in Command (2006)
- The Hard Corps (2006)
- Moondance Alexander (2007)
- Linewatch (2008)
- Hardwired (2009)
- Ticking Clock (2011) (Direct-to-Video)
- Beverly Hills Chihuahua 2 (2011) (Direct-to-Video)
- Assassination Games (2011)
- Arena (2011)
- Meeting Evil (2012)
- One in the Chamber (2012)
- Six Bullets (2012)
- The Package (2013)
- A Christmas Prince (2017)
- Christmas Inheritance (2017)
- The Holiday Calendar (2018)
- The Princess Switch (2018)
- A Christmas Prince: The Royal Wedding (2018)
- Holiday in the Wild (2019)
- The Knight Before Christmas (2019)
- A Christmas Prince: The Royal Baby (2019)
- The Princess Switch: Switched Again (2020)
- Operation Christmas Drop (2020)
- The Princess Switch 3: Romancing the Star (2021)
- A Castle for Christmas (2021)
- Falling for Christmas (2022)
- Irish Wish (2024)
- Mother of the Bride (2024)
- The Image of You (2024)
- Winter Spring Summer or Fall (2024)

=== Television films ===
- Sketch Artist (1992)
- Ring of the Musketeers (1992)
- Love, Cheat & Steal (1993)
- Sketch Artist II: Hands That See (1995)
- Johnny & Clyde (1995)
- Breakfast with Einstein (1998)
- Route 9 (1998)
- Absence of God (1999)
- Annie (1999)
- A Family in Crisis: The Elian Gonzales Story (2000)
- Joe and Max (2002)
- Borderline (2002)
- Pavement (2002)
- Bugs (2003)
- Pumpkinhead: Ashes to Ashes (2006)
- Pumpkinhead: Blood Feud (2007)
- Taking Chance (2009)
- Mothman (2010)
- Witchville (2010)
- William & Catherine: A Royal Romance (2011)
- A Princess for Christmas (2011)
- TalhotBlond (2012)
- The Sweeter Side of Life (2012)
- Heebie Jeebies (2012)
- Flying Monkeys (2012)
- When Calls the Heart (2012) (TV Movie)
- The Christmas Spirit (2012)
- A Royal Christmas (2014)
- When Calls the Heart (2014–Present) (TV Series)
- Murder, She Baked: A Chocolate Chip Cookie Mystery (2015)
- Murder, She Baked: A Plum Pudding Murder Mystery (2015)
- Crown for Christmas (2015)
- A Christmas Detour (2015)
- A Christmas Melody (2015)
- Mariah Carey's Merriest Christmas (2015) (TV Special)
- Murder, She Baked: A Peach Cobbler Mystery (2016)
- Flower Shop Mystery: Mum's the Word (2016)
- Flower Shop Mystery: Snipped in the Bud (2016)
- Murder, She Baked: A Deadly Recipe (2016)
- The Wedding March (2016)
- Flower Shop Mystery: Dearly Depotted (2016)
- For Love & Honor (2016)
- A Wish for Christmas (2016)
- Every Christmas Has a Story (2016)
- I'll Be Home for Christmas (2016)
- The National Christmas Tree Lighting (2016) (TV Special)
- Love on Ice (2017)
- A Royal Winter (2017)
- Campfire Kiss (2017)
- Murder, She Baked: Just Desserts (2017)
- Wedding March 2: Resorting to Love (2017)
- My Favorite Wedding (2017)
- The Saint (2017)
- Darrow & Darrow (2017)
- Christmas in Angel Falls (2017)
- Christmas Encore (2017)
- My Secret Valentine (2018)
- Wedding March 3: Here Comes the Bride (2018)
- Royal Hearts (2018)
- A Royal Matchmaker (2018)
- Darrow & Darrow: In the Key of Murder (2018)
- Wedding March 4: Something Old, Something New (2018)
- Darrow & Darrow: Body of Evidence (2018)
- Christmas in Love (2018)
- Return to Christmas Creek (2018)
- Christmas at the Palace (2018)
- Pride, Prejudice, and Mistletoe (2018)
- Christmas at Grand Valley (2018)
- Winter Love Story (2019)
- The 27th Annual Movieguide Awards (2019) (TV Special)
- Wedding March 5: My Boyfriend's Back (2019)
- A Taste of Summer (2019)
- The Crossword Mysteries: A Puzzle to Die For (2019)
- Angel Falls: A Novel Holiday (2019)
- Christmas in Rome (2019)
- Sense, Sensibility & Snowmen (2019)
- When Hope Calls (2019–Present) (TV Series)
- A Valentine's Match (2020)
- Country at Heart (2020)
- Sweet Carolina (2021)
