= Razaaq Adoti =

British actor, producer and screenwriter

- Born: 27 June 1973 (age 53); London, England
- Education: Royal Central School of Speech and Drama
- Occupations: Actor, producer, screenwriter

Razaaq Adoti (born 27 June 1973) is a British actor, producer and screenwriter.

== Early life ==
Adoti was born in Forest Gate, London, and is of Nigerian descent. He landed his first professional screen role on the British television show, Press Gang, playing a police officer. After a season with the National Youth Music Theatre (NYMT) winning the Edinburgh Festival Fringe First Award with Aesop, A New Opera and playing the lead role of Nathan Detroit in Guys and Dolls, Adoti was accepted into the Central School of Speech and Drama, where he studied for three years and earned a degree in acting.

== Career ==
=== Actor ===
Adoti was cast as Yamba in Steven Spielberg's feature epic, Amistad alongside Morgan Freeman, Nigel Hawthorne, Anthony Hopkins and Matthew McConaughey. After completing Amistad, he returned to London where he worked on various television and film projects, including Paul McGuigan's Gangster No. 1, and Black Hawk Down, directed by Ridley Scott, in which he played the antagonist Yousuf Dahir Mo'alim. Since then, Adoti has starred in numerous productions including Paul W. S. Anderson's Resident Evil: Apocalypse, Haven, Doom (based on the popular video game of the same name) and The Hard Corps. Adoti also starred as Dutch Maas in Bill Duke's 2008 film, Cover.

=== Producer ===
Adoti, through his Area Boyz production company, wrote the screenplay Sons of the Soil (formerly Area Boyz), which was filmed in England and Nigeria. He also served as host and co-producer of the Fox Soccer Channel television show titled Extra Time, which premiered in summer 2008.

== Filmography ==
=== Film ===
| Year | Title | Role | Notes |
|---|---|---|---|
| 1997 | Remember Me? | Chas | |
| 1997 | Amistad | Yamba | |
| 2000 | Gangster No. 1 | Roland | |
| 2001 | Black Hawk Down | Yousuf Dahir Mo'alim | |
| 2004 | Resident Evil: Apocalypse | Sgt. Peyton Wells | |
| 2004 | Haven | Richie Rich | |
| 2005 | Doom | Duke | |
| 2006 | The Still Life | Rodney | |
| 2006 | Second in Command | Gunnery Sergeant Earl Darnell | |
| 2007 | Love... & Other 4 Letter Words | Chef | |
| 2007 | Cover | Dutch Mass | |
| 2010 | Barry Munday | Sprio | |
| 2010 | Saidi's Song | Ike Dilo | |
| 2011 | CIS: Las Gidi | Officer Ebenezer Bassey | |
| 2011 | Black Gold | Timi Garbiel | |
| 2012 | Black November | Sodi | |
| 2017 | The Summoning | Mills | |
| 2017 | Boxing Day: A Day After Christmas | Michael Adeyemi | |
| 2018 | El Africano | Lanre Bello | |
| 2020 | Choices | Kizito | |
| TBA | The Experiment | Lincoln Jones | Post-production |

=== Television ===
| Year | Title | Role | Notes |
|---|---|---|---|
| 1991 | Press Gang | Constable | Episode: "Killer on the Line" |
| 1995 | Soldier Soldier | Cpl. William Markham | 4 episodes |
| 1995, 1998 | The Bill | Various roles | 2 episodes |
| 1996 | The Ruth Rendell Mysteries | Patrick Akande | 3 episodes |
| 1996 | Thief Takers | Henry | Episode: "The Outcasts" |
| 1997 | Holding On | Chris | 4 episodes |
| 1998 | The Vanishing Man | Jacob | 4 episodes |
| 1999–2000 | Dream Team | Wes Kingsley | 61 episodes |
| 2000 | Attachments | Olly | 5 episodes |
| 2001 | Men Only | Dwight | Television film |
| 2002 | Rescue Me | Scott | Episode #1.2 |
| 2011 | NCIS | Mike Sullivan | Episode: "Thirst" |
| 2015 | The Librarians | Doorman | Episode: "And the Image of Image" |
| 2018 | The Assassination of Gianni Versace | Detective Jackson | Episode: "House by the Lake" |
| 2018 | Colony | Alan's guard | Episode: "End of the Road" |
| 2019 | NCIS: Los Angeles | Various roles | 2 episodes |
| 2021 | Consequences | Older wise man | 3 episodes |
