= Mark McCracken =

American actor

- Born: Greensboro, North Carolina, USA
- Occupation: Actor
- Years active: 1987–present

Mark McCracken is an American actor.

McCracken was born in Greensboro, North Carolina and attended the University of North Carolina at Greensboro. He portrayed monsters Mant in Matinee (1993), Pumpkinhead in Pumpkinhead II: Blood Wings (1994) and Balacau in DNA (1996), also appeared in Randall Wallace's historycal war film We Were Soldiers (2002) as Ed "Too Tall" Freeman. His television credits include Miami Vice, Ellen and The Outer Limits.

== Filmography ==
- Death of a Saleswoman (2005) as Abel Gunk
- The Court (TV) as Technical Director (2 episodes)
- We Were Soldiers (2002) as Ed "Too Tall" Freeman
- The Comedy Team of Pete & James (2001) as Replacement Pete
- DNA (1996) as Sergeant Reinhardt / Balacau
- The Outer Limits as Jailer (1 episode, 1995)
- Ellen as Richard (1 episode, 1994)
- Pumpkinhead II: Blood Wings (1994) as Pumpkinhead
- Matinee (1993) as Mant / Bill
- Swamp Thing as Matt Caleb (1 episode, 1992)
- Disney Presents The 100 Lives of Black Jack Savage as Freddie (1 episode, 1991)
- B.L. Stryker (1 episode, 1989)
- Miami Vice ... (3 episodes, 1987–1989)
