= Duncan Roy =

English film director and producer

- Born: 8 July 1960 (age 65); Whitstable, Kent, England
- Occupation(s): Film director, film producer

Duncan Roy (born 8 July 1960) is an English film director and producer, script writer, art director and television personality.

== Early life ==
Roy was born on 8 July 1960, in Whitstable, Kent, England to Frances Elizabeth Spark and Kuros Khazaei. From the age of 2 he was raised by his mother and stepfather, David W. Roy in Whitstable.

== Career ==
Roy was a subject of Robin Soans's play, Life After Scandal in 2007. He has also been the subject of a BBC Radio 4 documentary. In 1985, Roy worked at the Richard Demarco Gallery in Edinburgh. While there, he organized art tours for the gallery to Germany and Poland with Joseph Beuys and Tadeusz Kantor. It was at this time that he met Jay Jopling, one of the subjects of his autobiographical documentary Whitstable.

Roy's 2002 film AKA is based on his personal experience beginning in 1979 when he headed for Paris, leaving Roy behind and reinventing himself as Lord Anthony Rendlesham.

"As Anthony Rendlesham, I didn't have to clutter my head with all the stories of my family, the terrible times. I could be clean, simple, grand. I was everything I wanted to be."

== Personal life ==
Starting 1 November 2009, Roy appeared on VH1's Sex Rehab with Dr. Drew, a reality television series about treating sexual addiction. In early 2012, The Independent reported that Roy battled with cancer and had a tumor removed.

On 19 October 2012 a class action suit was filed by Roy and five others as class representatives as and on behalf of immigrants in L.A. County Jail detained without opportunity to post bail. Roy was detained for 89 days. Roy's Los Angeles bail bondsman Morris Demayo, who worked on getting him bailed out, recalls “The minute he got arrested, it was one weird incident after another. The jailer basically said 'We have an ICE hold, so we can't accept the bond.' There was just a runaround." The suit was joined by the ACLU among other groups.

== Awards ==
AKA

- 2002 L.A. Outfest
  - Won – Audience Award
- 2002 Miami Gay and Lesbian Film Festival
  - Won – Jury Award
- 2002 Seattle Lesbian & Gay Film Festival
  - Won – Jury Award
- 2002 Copenhagen Gay & Lesbian Film Festival
  - Won – Audience Award
- 2003 BAFTA Awards
  - Nominated – Carl Foreman Award for the Most Promising Newcomer
- 2002 British Independent Film Awards
  - Nominated – Douglas Hickox Award
- 2002 Emden International Film Festival
  - Nominated – Emden Film Award

== Filmography ==
- The Picture of Dorian Gray (2006)
- Method (2004)
- AKA (2002)
- Clancy's Kitchen (1996)
- Jackson: My Life... Your Fault (1995)
