= Pumpkinhead: Blood Feud =

2007 horror film

- Promotional release poster
- Genre: Horror
- Based on: Pumpkinhead by Ed Justin
- Written by: Michael Hurst
- Directed by: Michael Hurst
- Starring: Rob Freeman; Amy Manson; Bradley Taylor; Lance Henriksen
- Theme music composer: Rob Lord
- Countries of origin: United Kingdom; Romania; United States; Switzerland
- Original language: English

Production
- Executive producers: Reuben Liber; Karri O'Reilly
- Producers: Brad Krevoy; Donald Kushner; Pierre Spengler
- Cinematography: Erik Alexander Wilson
- Editor: Robin Hill
- Running time: 95 minutes
- Production companies: Sony Pictures Home Entertainment; Sci-Fi Pictures; MPCA; Lost Junction Films; Castel Film Romania; Clubdeal

Original release
- Network: Sci Fi Channel
- Release: February 27, 2007

Related
- Pumpkinhead: Ashes to Ashes (2006)

Pumpkinhead: Blood Feud is a 2007 made-for-television supernatural horror film and the fourth installment in the Pumpkinhead film series of horror films. The film is written and directed by Michael Hurst. It’s an international co-production between the United Kingdom, Romania, the United States and Switzerland.

== Plot ==
Two men on their motorcycles are driving away from Pumpkinhead. One of the men hits a tree branch in their path, falling from his motorcycle and allowing Pumpkinhead to catch up to him. As the man is being killed, the film cuts to a man in a log cabin who seems to share the pain inflicted by Pumpkinhead on the fallen man. The surviving man, named Dallas, rides to the log cabin, and the man who conjured Pumpkinhead, begging him to call the demon off. Pumpkinhead smashes through the window and Dallas attempts to fend him off by shooting him with a small pistol with little effect, and is clawed in the chest by the demon. When Dallas realizes that his bullets have no effect on Pumpkinhead, he swears to take the summoner with him, shooting the man and killing him, causing Pumpkinhead to vanish. Ed Harley then appears telling Dallas that Pumpkinhead will return and there will be no place to hide.

Five years later, it is shown that the family of the Hatfields' and McCoys' ongoing feud started because of a car in the 1930s. The Hatfields then trash a McCoy wedding. Jody Hatfield sneaks out to see her true love, Ricky McCoy. Ricky brings his sister, Sarah, to look out for him and Jody. The two then start to make out.

Jody's brothers find and kill Sarah by accident and try to kill Ricky. Ricky then finds his sister's body and goes to Haggis for help. Haggis tells him of the price it costs to summon Pumpkinhead, and Haggis is shown talking to Ed Harley's spirit. Haggis states that her choice does not matter in the end; only the summoner may make the decision to kill Pumpkinhead. The two invoke Pumpkinhead to kill the Hatfields.

Most of the Hatfields have been killed, as well as some of the McCoy family. Ricky realizes what he has done and takes Pumpkinhead with him to fall down a well.

== Cast ==
- Bob Gunter as Pumpkinhead
- Amy Manson as Jody Hatfield
- Bradley Taylor as Ricky McCoy
- Claire Lams as Dolly Hatfield
- Rob Freeman as Sheriff Dallas Pope
- Ovidiu Niculescu as Bobby Joe Hatfield
- Peter Barnes as Papa McCoy
- Lance Henriksen as Ed Harley
- Elvin Dandel as Tristan McCoy
- Richard Durden as Old Man Hatfield
- Alin Constantinescu as Emmett Hatfield
- Razvan Oprea as Brett Hatfield
- Rudy Rosenfeld as Abner Hatfield
- Lynne Verrall as Haggis
- Calin Puia as Tommy Hatfield
- Elias Ferkin as Billy Bob Hatfield
- Iulia Boros as Mama McCoy
- Maria Roman as Sara McCoy
- Bart Sidles as Andy Mills
- Alexandru Geoana as Town Boy #1
- Cristi Feter as Johnson
- Fanel Ursu as Johnny Pope
- Aurel Boata as Charlie Hatfield
- Daniel Tomescu as Dale Hatfield
- Dicu Marian as Wayne Hatfield
- Ion Carangea as Jimmy Langford
- Florin Barcun as Danny Hatfield
- Adrian Pavlovschi as Hatfield Boy #1
- Daniel Pasleaga as Hatfield Boy #2
- Mihai Ionita as McCoy Boy #1
- Vasilescu Valentin as McCoy Boy #2
- Isabela Melinte as Young McCoy Girl #1
- Catalina Alexandru as Young McCoy Girl #2

== Production ==
Initially announced as Pumpkinhead 4, it was filmed in Bucharest, Romania back-to-back with another sequel titled Pumpkinhead 3. The films were renamed Pumpkinhead: Blood Feud and Pumpkinhead: Ashes to Ashes, respectively, before their release.

Talks of another Pumpkinhead sequel were briefly considered, but these plans were abandoned in favor of a reboot to the franchise.

== Release ==
Pumpkinhead: Blood Feud premiered in Dayton, Ohio, on February 2, 2007, then made its broadcast premiere on Syfy on February 10.

=== Home media ===
The film was released on DVD on October 2, 2007.

== Reception ==
Jon Condit of Dread Central rated it 3 out of 5 stars and wrote that it is modestly entertaining. David Johnson of DVD Verdict wrote: "It's an adequate horror flick that maybe thinks it's a little more awesome than it actually is, but the sum total of the copious bloodletting and fun, old-school creature effects equals 'not a waste of time'".
