= Bloodwings: Pumpkinhead's Revenge =

1995 video game

- Developer(s): BAP Interactive
- Publisher(s): Electronic Arts
- Platform(s): MS-DOS
- Release: 1995
- Genre(s): First-person shooter

Bloodwings: Pumpkinhead's Revenge is a first-person shooter video game developed by American studio BAP Interactive and published in 1995 by Electronic Arts for MS-DOS. Bloodwings: Pumpkinhead's Revenge is a full motion video game loosely based on the film of the same name. The game has been criticized as being a "Doom rip-off".

== Gameplay ==
The game is a first-person shooter and includes several video clips taken from Pumpkinhead II. When the player kills an enemy, the player can collect "Tantanik Crystals" which are used to play clips from the movie where the player has to grab items from the video. Although a majority of the clips are from the film, certain videos, such as one of two men unloading stolen items in the woods, are not from the film.

== Development ==
The game was developed concurrently with the film Pumpkinhead II: Blood Wings per the desires of producer Jed Weintraub with the sets, actors, and props shared between the two productions. By July 1993, Ami Dolenz and Soleil Moon Frye were shooting additional material for game exclusive sequences. Development of the game was handled by BAP Interactive, the interactive arm of boutique studio Bruce Austin Productions with Bloodwings: Pumpkinhead's Revenge being the studio's first interactive release.

== Reception ==
Reception

Review scores
Publication	Score
PC Gamer (US)	46%
Computer Game Review	60/59/50

The game was poorly received. Tasos Kaiafas remarked that the game "may be the bottom of the barrel of Doom clones".

Bloodwings was reviewed in PC Gamer US, which rated the game 46% and wrote: "If I'm going to watch a horror film, I'd rather see the whole thing the way it was meant to be seen, in a theater or on my TV, rather than playing a third-rate shooter for a few minutes, then watching intermittent clips of block, grainy video. About the only good things that came out of my time with Bloodwings are that I now know how to save some money and wait for the movie's release on video - and you know not to buy this game".

Entertainment Weekly gave the game a C and complained that the game's dungeons were difficult to navigate.

The reviewer in Computer Gaming World #135 (October 1995) commented that "the action gets completely bogged down in mediocre graphics, muddy controls and hokey schmoo-looking creatures. The scary thing is, the game might be better than the movie".

A reviewer in German magazine PC Player (July 1995) called it a strange 3D action adventure, and a reviewer in German magazine PC Games (July 1995) said that only manufacturers like Bullfrog, Origin, or LucasArts could keep the genre of 3D action games alive while the market was overflowing with them.
