= Donald Kushner =

American film producer

- Born: March 2, 1945 (age 81); Providence, Rhode Island, U.S.
- Occupations: Film producer; television producer; theater producer
- Years active: 1978–present
- Known for: Tron and The Adventures of Pinocchio
- Children: 3

Donald Kushner (born March 2, 1945) is an American producer who has worked with animation, live-action, and theater productions.

== Biography ==
Kushner was born March 2, 1945, to Ann Gardner. He has two sisters.

Kushner attended high school in Providence, Rhode Island, received an undergraduate degree from Syracuse University in 1971 and a Boston University J.D. degree in 1973. He then studied art for one year in Florence, Italy.

Upon returning to Boston, Kushner set up a law practice which included a number of show business clients which in turn led him to the opportunity to produce plays for the Boston stage, among them P.S. Your Cat Is Dead and the first theatrical adaptation of Kurt Vonnegut's Player Piano.

In 1977, Kushner formed a partnership with filmmaker Steven Lisberger, and in 1978, the pair moved to the West Coast where they produced the 90-minute animated film Animalympics for NBC, but which was ultimately aborted. He later produced his first live-action film, Tron, for Walt Disney Pictures.

After Tron, Kushner teamed with Glen A. Larson and Peter Locke and produced the 1980s television series Automan, which was about a holographic crime fighter. The series began in December 1983 and ended in August 1984 and used similar effects to those seen in Tron.

Kushner and his partner, Peter Locke, founded The Kushner-Locke Company in the 1980s where they continued to produce both film and television series'.

Kushner was credited as executive producer for the 2010 sequel to Tron, Tron: Legacy.

In May 2011, Kushner partnered with Elie Somaha in the purchase of Grauman's Chinese Theater, and planned to restore the landmark building, although rumors at the time were that it might be turned into a nightclub. The Chinese Theater reopened in September 2013 as an IMAX theater, complete with stadium-seating, while the new owners worked with several historical groups to maintain the heritage of the building.

== Personal life ==
Donald has two daughters and one son: Alwyn, Jasper, and Spencer, respectively. Alwyn Hight Kushner is also a producer and has worked with Donald on several films. She works as president and Chief Operating Officer of TCL Chinese Theater.
