= Un-Australian =

Pejorative term

Un-Australian is an increasingly pejorative term used in Australia. In modern usage, it has similar connotations to the United States term un-American, however the Australian term is somewhat older, being used as early as 1855 to describe an aspect of the landscape that was similar to that of Britain. Its modern usage was popularised during the 1990s by Prime Minister John Howard and One Nation Party founder Pauline Hanson; however, Stanley Bruce used it in reference to striking workers in 1925 and Joseph Lyons during the 1930s to decry communists and migrants from non-WASP backgrounds. In recent times, the word has been overused to the point of being a particular favourite of humourists and satirists. It is used in a humorous TV advertising campaign by Meat and Livestock Australia (MLA), in which ex-AFL footballer Sam Kekovich declares that not including lamb in one's diet is "un-Australian". The 2023 campaign saw MLA update their position on the term. Rather than using the term to divide, they declared that being un-Australian is a cause for celebration.

== Modern usage ==
While the origins of the term go back to the 1850s, the term "un-Australian" has risen in popularity since the mid-1990s. The definition of the word has changed from simply defining something, particularly art or literature, as not Australian in character to a broader, more negative connotation suggesting an activity, behaviour, belief or policy that is seen to be violating Australian cultural norms. In this sense, then, its usage is generally subjectively applied according to the user's beliefs. Furthermore, usage of the word in political campaigning is with the intention of sparking nationalistic ideals in the general public in order to increase and grow political support.

Judith Ireland, writing in The Sydney Morning Herald, notes John Howard is perhaps most responsible for the proliferation of the word, having used it in the 1980s to describe the proposed Australia Card legislation. During his term as prime minister, Howard repeatedly used the term "un-Australian" to describe striking workers, anti-globalisation and anti-war protestors and Opposition proposals to withdraw the country's military from Iraq. Millionaire businessman, philanthropist and human rights campaigner Dick Smith also described the Howard government's policies towards convicted terrorism supporter David Hicks and asylum seekers as "un-Australian".

In a more vernacular sense, the word is also often used in a jocular form for anything that could be considered not in accordance with the wider Australian community. In 2006, the Cultural Studies Association of Australasia convened its annual conference under the title "UnAustralia" at the University of Canberra with keynote speeches at Parliament House. Also in 2006, Melbourne artist, Azlan McLennan burned an Australian flag to coincide with Australia Day. The artwork, "Proudly UnAustralian" was controversially removed from its public billboard display by local authorities, prompting much debate about free speech versus police powers.
