= Michael Doneger =

American film director

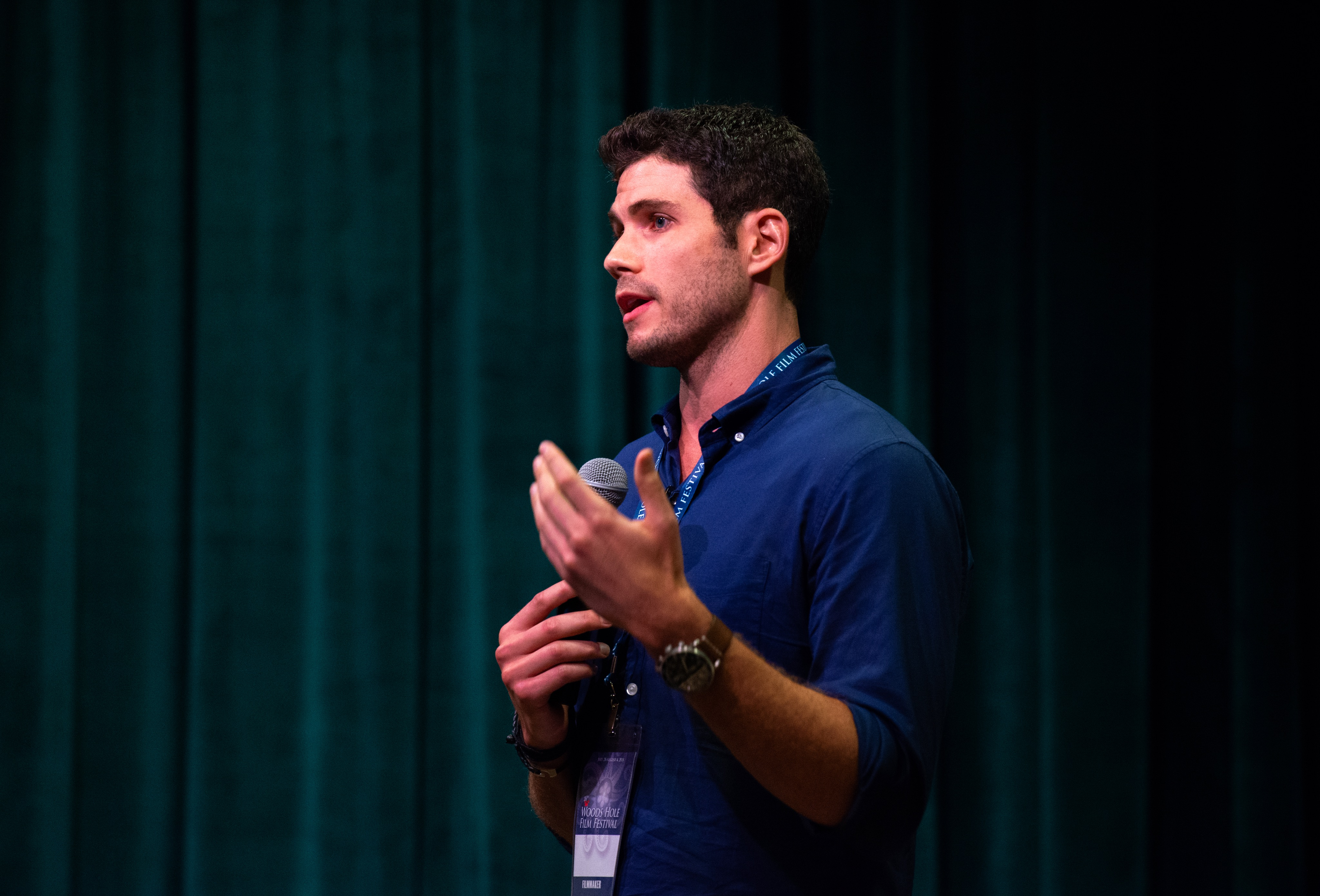
- Born: July 21, 1986 (age 40); Hewlett, New York, United States
- Education: Johns Hopkins University
- Occupations: Film director, screenwriter, producer, and actor
- Website: www.cloverhillpictures.com

Michael Doneger (born July 21, 1986) is an American film director, screenwriter, producer, and actor based in Los Angeles, California. Doneger is notable as screenwriter of Shelly starring Awkwafina and Karen Gillan, lead actor in the 2015 film The Escort, director of the film Brampton's Own, which starred actors Jean Smart, Alex Russell and Rose McIver, as well as director and producer of the documentary Fate of a Sport that was executive produced by LeBron James and acquired by ESPN Films. Doneger also wrote, directed, and starred in his debut feature film This Thing with Sarah. In addition, Doneger was a former lacrosse player on the Johns Hopkins Blue Jays and San Jose Stealth lacrosse teams.

== Early life and education ==
Doneger was born in Hewlett, New York. Doneger attended Lynbrook Senior High School in Lynbrook, New York and Johns Hopkins University in Baltimore, Maryland, where he played lacrosse at both schools. At Johns Hopkins University, he played for the Blue Jays lacrosse team while studying screenwriting. Doneger then continued on to be a professional National Lacrosse League player for the San Jose Stealth during the 2009 season.

== Career ==
After graduating from Johns Hopkins University, Doneger moved to Los Angeles, California to pursue a career in the film industry. Doneger wrote, directed, and starred in This Thing with Sarah in 2013, co-starring Wes Chatham. This Thing with Sarah was funded from the finalist prize money that Doneger had earned for his commercial Elevator Girl at the 2011 Crash the Super Bowl competition.

In 2015, Doneger wrote and starred in The Escort along with Lyndsy Fonseca. According to Sheri Linden of Variety, Doneger and his co-star in The Escort "played with charm... and their mercenary alliance proceeds as a spirited, mostly convincing, exploration of life in the big city." In 2016, MTV also began to develop a drama series pilot based on Doneger's 2015 film.

In 2018, Doneger wrote and directed the film Brampton's Own. The film's lead actors were Alex Russell and Rose McIver, with Scott Porter, Spencer Grammer, John Getz, and Jean Smart playing supporting roles. The film was also featured at the Nashville Film Festival.

In 2020, Doneger conceived the story and co-wrote the screenplay for the film Shelly with Liz Storm. The film starring Awkwafina and Karen Gillan was acquired by Amazon Studios with Jude Weng as director.

In 2022, Doneger directed and produced a Lacrosse documentary featuring Lacrosse star, Paul Rabil, in Fate of a Sport. The film was executive produced by LeBron James and acquired by ESPN Films before premiering at the Tribeca Film Festival.

Additionally, Doneger is the founder of Cloverhill Pictures, a Los Angeles-based film company.

== Filmography ==
Filmography for Michael Doneger:

Year	Title	Credits
2022	Fate of a Sport	Director, producer
2020	Shelly	Story By, Writer
2018	Brampton's Own	Director, writer
2015	The Escort	Lead Actor, Writer, Producer
2013	This Thing with Sarah	Director, writer, producer
