= Sam Kekovich =

Australian rules footballer (born 1950)

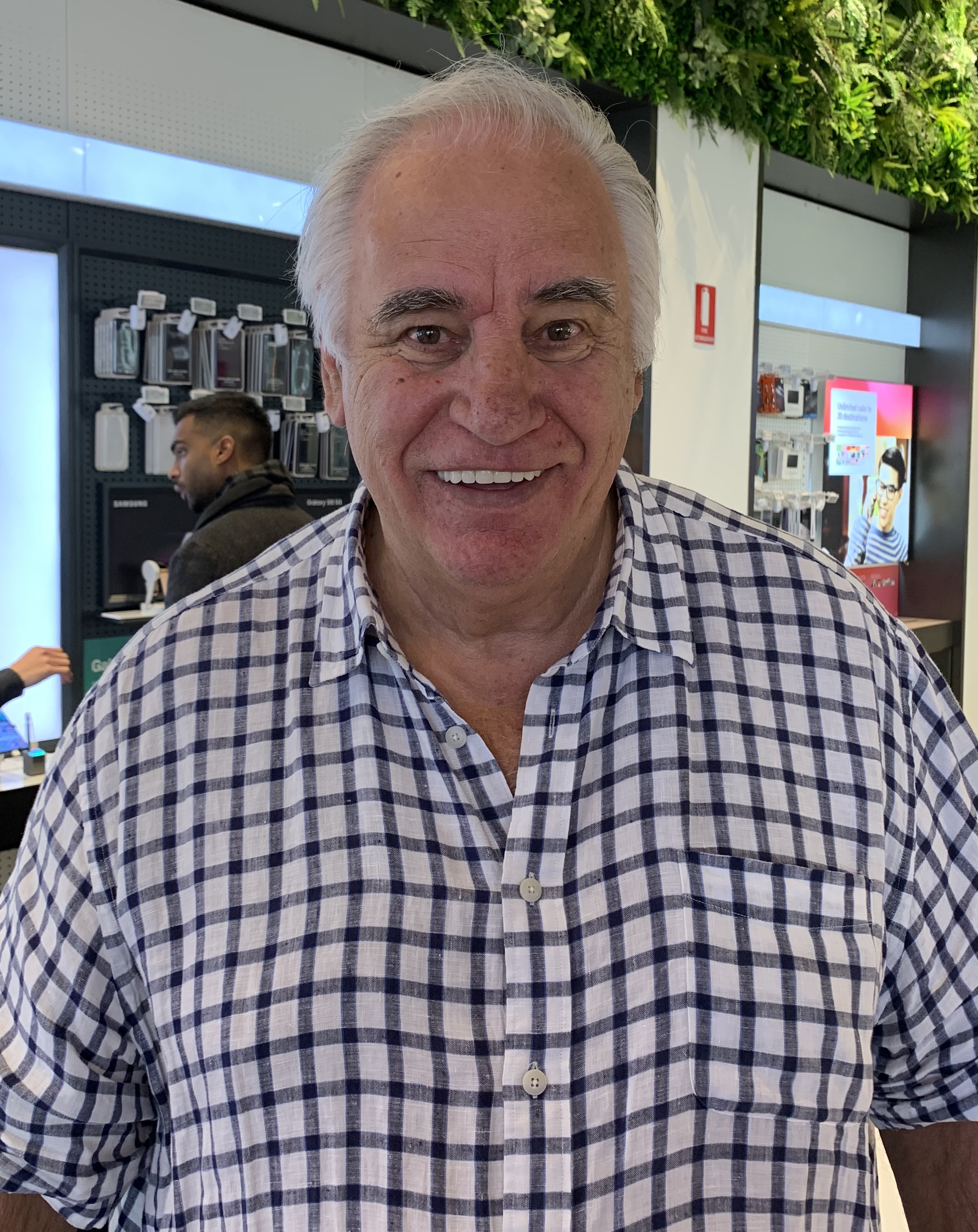
- Kekovich in September 2019

Personal information
- Full name: Sam Kekovich
- Nickname: Slammin' Sam
- Born: 11 March 1950 (age 76); Manjimup, Western Australia
- Original team: Myrtleford (O&MFL)
- Height: 187 cm (6 ft 2 in)
- Weight: 95 kg (209 lb)
- Position: Midfielder / Forward

Playing career^{1}
| Years | Club | Games (Goals) |
| 1968–1976 | North Melbourne | 124 (228) |
| 1977 | Collingwood | 4 (4) |
| 1978–1979 | Prahran | 20 (49) |
| Total | | 148 (281) |

Representative team honours
| Years | Team | Games (Goals) |
| 1969 | Victoria | |
- ^{1} Playing statistics correct to the end of 1977.

Career highlights
- North Melbourne Premiership player: 1975; Syd Barker Medal: 1969; North Melbourne leading Goalkicker: 1969, 1971 & 1972

Sam Kekovich (born 11 March 1950) is an Australian media personality, sports commentator, meat lobbyist and former Australian rules football player.

He is well known for his controversial behaviour, both on and off the field, and most recently for his series of satirical advertisements as the spokesman for Meat and Livestock Australia (MLA) to promote the lamb industry.

== Kekovich brothers ==
His older brother is the former VFL full-forward Brian Kekovich, who played two seasons of senior VFL football with Carlton, including kicking four goals in Carlton's 1968 Grand Final victory.

Brian's career ended immediately after the Grand Final, due to a serious back injury he had sustained earlier in the 1968 season.

His younger brother, Michael, recruited from Trinity Grammar, who was showing great promise at North Melbourne at the age of 16, played for the North Melbourne First XVIII on Thursday, 10 September 1970 against Footscray, in the first round of the 1970 VFL night premiership. North Melbourne lost 6.7 (43) to 14.13 (97).

Michael also played in the North Melbourne Second XVIII team that lost the 1970 preliminary final to Melbourne, and he kicked one goal in a losing team.

Michael was killed, aged 17, when he was hit by a car whilst on a training run in High Street, Doncaster (near Curnola Avenue), on Saturday evening 26 June 1971.

== Football career ==
Kekovich started his senior football career with Myrtleford in the Ovens & Murray Football League and kicked 55 goals in 1967 prior to playing in the Victorian Football League (VFL) with club North Melbourne (Kangaroos) in 1968. The following year he won the club's best and fairest award and was the top goalkicker with 56 goals. He played a key role in the club's first premiership win in 1975 by assisting ruckman Mick Nolan by contesting boundary throw-ins, in which he won most of the hit-outs against Hawthorn's top ruckman Don Scott.

After playing 124 VFL games for the Kangaroos, between 1968 and 1976, he moved to Collingwood in 1977, but only played four games, retiring from the VFL that season. His football career did not end, as he switched to play in the Victorian Football Association for the Prahran Football Club; he played 20 games for the Two Blues and played in the 1978 VFA Premiership side against Preston at the Junction Oval.

In 1987, Kekovich signed to coach VFA club Camberwell, which had just been relegated to Division 2 following a winless 1986 season. Kekovich coached the Cobras for three seasons and he left the club after its winless 1989 season.

He was included in the North Melbourne Team of the Century, on the interchange bench.

== Media career ==
He has carried on his flamboyant style into the media sector, being most notable for his 'rants' on the ABC show The Fat, a breakfast show on Melbourne radio station 3AK, as a radio presenter on Melbourne Sports Radio Station SEN 1116, in pre-match AFL coverage on Triple M, and on PTI Australia on ESPN.

Kekovich's direct-to-camera TV monologues are done deadpan and use wide-ranging cultural references. Created by the writers of The Fat, the monologues were first piloted with AFL player John Platten and boxer Spike Cheney before the ABC asked Kekovich to perform. The 'rants' normally place in contrast many disparate or incongruous verbal images and ideas, ending with the trademark, "You know it makes sense. I'm Sam Kekovich." The ABC released a spoken word album, You Know it Makes Sense, which was nominated for the ARIA Award for Best Comedy Release at the ARIA Music Awards of 2002. Kekovich has performed these 'rants' in commercials for North Melbourne Football Club membership drives and Dan Murphy's bottle shops.

From 2005 to 2014, Kekovich headed a well-known annual advertising campaign for Meat and Livestock Australia in the lead-up to Australia Day encouraging people to eat more Australian lamb. The advertisements were delivered in the style of Kekovich's deadpan rants, and often made satirically outlandish statements regarding un-Australianism. The first such advertisement drew particular controversy, when he labelled vegetarians as being un-Australian for not eating lamb on Australia Day, provoking outrage from animal rights activists and groups such as the Australian Vegetarian Society; but the Australian Advertising Standards Bureau allowed the ads to remain on the air, ruling them to be satirical, despite viewers' complaints. Many of the subsequent ads have also drawn complaints from viewers, but all have been dismissed by the Bureau. In the Australia Day commercial promoting lamb for the BBQ, which featured Richie Benaud, Kekovich made an appearance along with "Captain Cook", "Ned Kelly", "Burke and Wills", and Ita Buttrose.

He continued in the Lambassador role into the next decade, appearing in the Australia Day lamb advertisements as knocking down the interstate walls in 2021 and as the head of the National Lamb Rollout in 2022.

Kekovich was an executive producer on the Australian film Blinder released in 2013. Shot around Torquay, Victoria, the film is about a legendary former local footballer, Tom Dunn of the Torquay Tigers.

In October 2018 Kekovich appeared on Facebook advertising supporting the Australian Conservatives political party, with an aim to air the ads on TV. The MLA criticised the use of the term "lambassador" to describe Kekovich in the Australian Conservatives ads.

=== Albums ===
List of albums
| Title | Album details |
|---|---|
| You Know It Makes Sense: The Wisdom of Slammin Sam Kekovich | Released: 2001; Label: ABC Audio (ABC12262); Formats: CD |

== Awards and nominations ==
=== ARIA Music Awards ===
The ARIA Music Awards is an annual awards ceremony held by the Australian Recording Industry Association. They commenced in 1987.

| Year | Nominee / work | Award | Result | Ref. |
|---|---|---|---|---|
| 2002 | You Know It Makes Sense: The Wisdom of Slammin Sam Kekovich | Best Comedy Release | Nominated | |
