= Oliver Ackland =

Australian actor (born 1979)

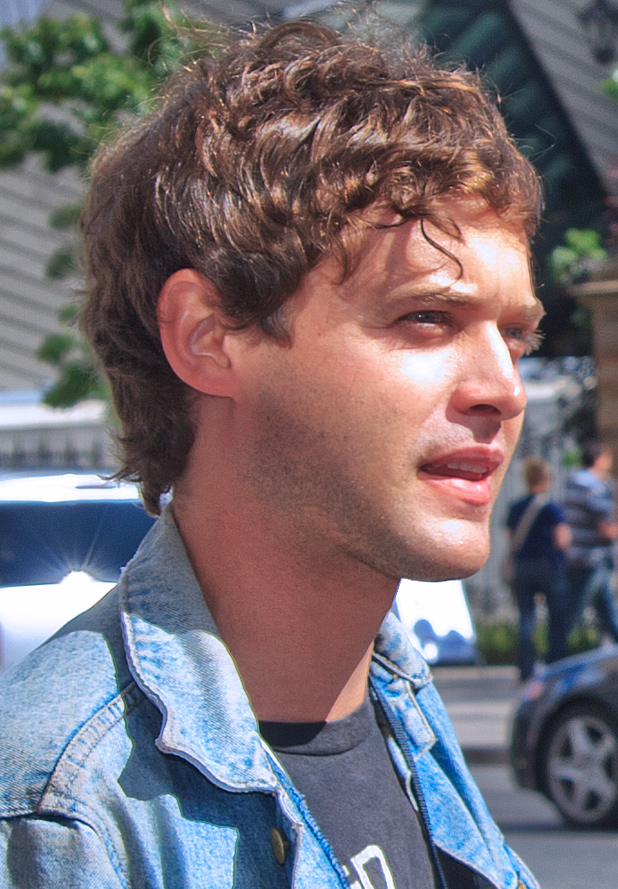
- Ackland at the 2010 Toronto International Film Festival
- Born: 9 November 1979 (age 46); Sydney, New South Wales, Australia
- Occupation: Actor
- Years active: 1988–present

Oliver Ackland (born 9 November 1979) is an Australian actor.

== Early life and education ==
Ackland stumbled upon acting at high school, when the school had a theatre sports competition, and they needed more participants to make up the numbers. He undertook his acting training at the Australian Theatre for Young People and NIDA's Summer School.

== Career ==
Ackland's first small screen role was as Vince Frasca in 2001 family series Outriders, in which he appeared for the duration of its run. He appeared in children's fantasy series Pirate Islands as the character Mars in 2003 and family comedy-drama series Out There from 2003 to 2004. He also scored guest roles in All Saints, Always Greener and Young Lions, before starring as the romantic lead in miniseries Jessica, opposite Leeanna Walsman and Sam Neill.

In 2005, Ackland featured alongside an all-star cast including Guy Pearce, Ray Winstone, John Hurt and Emily Watson in John Hillcoat's western feature The Proposition. He later appeared in 2008 telemovie thriller Emerald Falls with Georgie Parker and Vince Colosimo.

After working in bars and as a gardener to make ends meet, in 2009, Ackland was awarded the inaugural Heath Ledger scholarship by Australians in Film. The initiative, established in honour of the late actor, by Ledger's former partner Michelle Williams and Australian director Gregor Jordan, with help from Hugh Jackman, Naomi Watts and Nicole Kidman, awards its winners $10,000, flights to LA and introductions to agents and casting directors in the US. Ackland was chosen from 150 applicants, where the judges looked for early career actors with "initiative and exceptional talent with ability to convert ambitions to reality" and "the potential to be outstanding in an international context".

Ackland next starred in Ben Lucas' thriller Wasted on the Young, which premiered at the 2010 Sydney Film Festival and screened at the 2010 Toronto International Film Festival. The following year, he appeared as Toby Raven in the miniseries realisation of Tim Winton's award-winning novel Cloudstreet, directed by Matthew Saville, The same year, he also played Rhys in drama miniseries The Slap, adapted from the novel by Christos Tsiolkas, and starring Melissa George, Alex Dimitriades, Sophie Okonedo and Essie Davis.

In 2012, Ackland was seen in the comedy horror film 100 Bloody Acres, in a main role opposite Damon Herriman and Angus Sampson, as well as Richard Gray's sports drama feature Blinder and ABC telemovie The Mystery of a Hansom Cab.

Ackland next featured in 2014 political drama miniseries Party Tricks, playing Tom Worland, opposite Asher Keddie and Rodger Corser. He then landed a recurring guest role as Tristan de Martel in American supernatural drama series The Originals.

In 2019, Ackland played the part of Alex, a lawyer with a troubled past, in drama miniseries Secret Bridesmaids' Business, opposite Irish actress Katie McGrath, former Outriders castmate Abbie Cornish and former Wasted on the Young co-star Georgina Haig. The following year, he had a four-episode role as Young Donnie in the second season of sci-fi drama series Bloom, seeing him perform alongside the likes of Bryan Brown, Jacki Weaver, Gary Sweet and Phoebe Tonkin. He then had a recurring guest role as bikie gang member Lloyd in long-running soap opera Home and Away, before appearing as Peter Emery in the series Critical Incident in 2024.

Ackland has also appeared in numerous short films, including Eve (2006), Damian Walshe-Howling's The Bloody Sweet Hit (2007) and Engram (2014, co-starring alongside Isabel Lucas).

A graduate of College of Fine Arts (COFA), Ackland is also a visual artist, who has exhibited around Australia. He has been a finalist in both the 2023 Fishers Ghost Award and the 2024 National Emerging Art Prize. In 2024, he 2024 St Vincent’s Art Exhibition which raises funds for victims of domestic violence.

== Awards and nominations ==
| Year | Title | Role | Notes | Result | Ref. |
|---|---|---|---|---|---|
| 2009 | Oliver Ackland | Australians in Film | Heath Ledger Scholarship | Won | |
| 2023 | Oliver Ackland | Fishers Ghost Award | | Finalist | |
| 2024 | Oliver Ackland | | National Emerging Art Prize | Finalist | |
| 2025 | Critical Incident | Equity Ensemble Awards | Outstanding Performance by an Ensemble in a Drama Series | Finalist | |

== Filmography ==
=== Film ===
| Year | Title | Role | Notes | Ref. |
|---|---|---|---|---|
| 1999 | The Last Paperboy | The Paperboy | Short film | |
| 2000 | Therefore I Am | Simon | Short film | |
| 2000 | My Drug Buddy | Jim | Short film | |
| 2003 | Peter Pan | Groom | | |
| 2005 | The Proposition | Patrick Hopkins | | |
| 2006 | Eve | Jack | Short film | |
| 2007 | The Bloody Sweet Hit | Dylan | Short film | |
| 2009 | Emergence | Adam | Short film | |
| 2010 | Wasted on the Young | Darren | | |
| 2011 | 50-50 | Charlie | Short film | |
| 2011 | Tinman | Jim | Short film | |
| 2012 | 100 Bloody Acres | James | | |
| 2013 | Blinder | Tom Dunn | | |
| 2014 | Engram | | Short film | |
| 2019 | Dick | Dick | Short film | |

=== Television ===
| Year | Title | Role | Notes | Ref. |
|---|---|---|---|---|
| 2001 | Outriders | Vince Frasca | 26 episodes | |
| 2001 | All Saints | Nathan | | |
| 2002 | Young Lions | Liam Quinlan | Episode: "Serial Killer: Part 1" | |
| 2003 | Always Greener | Matt Payne | Episode: "Great and Not So Great Expectations" | |
| 2003 | Home and Away | Steven Ross | Episode: "1.3479" | |
| 2003 | Pirate Islands | Mars | 26 episodes | |
| 2003 | Out There | Peter Logan | 2 episodes: "Peggy" & "Some Wombats Have All the Luck" | |
| 2004 | Jessica | Jack Thomas | Miniseries | |
| 2004 | Cable | Pauli | TV movie | |
| 2008 | Emerald Falls | Steve Landers | TV movie | |
| 2011 | Cloudstreet | Toby Raven | Miniseries | |
| 2011 | The Slap | Rhys | 2 episodes: "Hector" & "Anouk" | |
| 2012 | The Mystery of a Hansom Cab | Brian Fitzgerald | TV movie | |
| 2014 | Party Tricks | Tom Worland | 6 episodes | |
| 2015 | Satisfaction | Julian | 1 episode | |
| 2015–2016 | The Originals | Tristan de Martel | 11 episodes | |
| 2019 | Secret Bridesmaids' Business | Alex Blake | 6 episodes | |
| 2020 | Bloom | Young Donnie | 5 episodes | |
| 2022–2023 | Home and Away | Lloyd Stevens | 3 episodes | |
| 2024 | Critical Incident | Snr Constable Peter Emery | 6 episodes | |

=== Music videos ===
| Year | Artist | Title | Role | Ref. |
|---|---|---|---|---|
| 2015 | Mysteries | Newly Thrown | Dan Burnstall | |
| 2016 | Broods | Heartlines | Boyfriend / Waiter | |

== Theatre ==
| Year | Title | Role | Notes | Ref. |
|---|---|---|---|---|
| 2000 | Birds | Stock Market Analyst | ATYP | |
