= Believe Me (film) =

2014 comedy-drama film directed by Will Bakke

- Theatrical release poster
- Directed by: Will Bakke
- Written by: Michael B. Allen; Will Bakke
- Produced by: Alex Carroll
- Starring: Alex Russell; Zachary Knighton; Johanna Braddy; Miles Fisher; Sinqua Walls; Max Adler; Christopher McDonald; Nick Offerman
- Cinematography: John W. Rutland
- Edited by: Will Bakke; Shane Hazen
- Music by: Cold War Kids; Belle and Sebastian; Leagues; Dr. Dog; JMSN; Phil Wickham; Hanan Townshend
- Production company: Riot Studios
- Distributed by: Headline Features; Gravitas Ventures; Spotlight Pictures
- Release date: September 26, 2014
- Running time: 93 minutes
- Country: United States
- Language: English

Believe Me is a 2014 American independent drama film directed by Will Bakke, co-written with Michael B. Allen, and produced by Alex Carroll. The film stars Alex Russell, Zachary Knighton, Johanna Braddy, Miles Fisher, Sinqua Walls, Max Adler, with Nick Offerman, and Christopher McDonald.

== Plot ==
Smart, handsome, and charming, there is no one who could say no to college senior Sam. But when a surprise tuition bill leaves him thousands of dollars in the hole, Sam is forced to think outside the box. Convincing his three roommates they can make a killing exploiting the gullible church crowd, the guys start a sham charity and begin campaigning across the country, raising funds for a cause as fake as their message. But when sweet tour manager Callie, the object of Sam's affections, discovers their ruse, it's Sam's moment, alone in the spotlight, to decide what he really believes.

== Cast ==
- Alex Russell as Sam
- Zachary Knighton as Gabriel
- Johanna Braddy as Callie
- Miles Fisher as Pierce
- Sinqua Walls as Tyler
- Max Adler as Baker
- Nick Offerman as Sean
- Christopher McDonald as Ken
- Lecrae as Dr. Darnall Malmquist

== Production ==
Believe Me is the feature film debut from Riot Studios, producers of One Nation Under God and Beware of Christians. The film is directed by Will Bakke, who also co-wrote the screenplay with Michael B. Allen, and produced by Alex Carroll. John W. Rutland is the director of photography. Rapper Lecrae was added as a featured cast member alongside rising Australian star, Alex Russell who is playing the lead role.

The film was released on September 26, 2014, in Theaters and On Demand.

The filming of the dramatic comedy began on August 5, 2013, in Austin, Texas and was completed in 20 days.
