= The Escort (2015 film) =

2015 film by Will Slocombe

- Theatrical release poster
- Directed by: Will Slocombe
- Written by: Brandon A. Cohen; Michael Doneger
- Produced by: Michael Doneger; Blake Goza
- Starring: Michael Doneger; Lyndsy Fonseca; Tommy Dewey; Rachel Resheff; Rumer Willis; Bruce Campbell
- Cinematography: Kyle Klutz
- Edited by: Brad McLaughlin
- Music by: Rob Barbato
- Production companies: Cloverhill Pictures; Perspective Productions; Skyhook Productions
- Distributed by: The Orchard
- Release dates: June 15, 2015 (Los Angeles Film Festival); July 28, 2015 (VOD)
- Running time: 88 minutes
- Country: United States
- Language: English

The Escort is a 2015 American romantic comedy-drama film directed by Will Slocombe, starring Michael Doneger and Lyndsy Fonseca.

Desperate for a good story to land a magazine job, sex-addicted journalist Mitch convinces high-class, Stanford-educated escort Natalie to allow him to shadow her.

== Plot ==
High-end escort 'Victoria' often carries out role play scenarios for her generally wealthy clients. Journalist Mitch is a sex addict, whose friends and family worry about, as he is disinterested in entering a relationship. His friend and cousin JP constantly tries to set him up on dates, but he prefers to hook up anonymously via the sex app Climax. 'Victoria' and Mitch inadvertently meet in an elite bar, her seeking a client, he seeking his hookup.

Mitch is fired from his newspaper job for having sex with an intern and because they are downsizing. He interviews at several places, but no one is hiring. Finally applying at a magazine, as the editor is not sure he would be a good fit, Mitch proposes he write an article on spec. So, she promises to hire him if he writes a more interesting article than his competitors.

Mitch decides to write about 'Victoria', the Stanford-educated escort he met by chance. He again finds her in the hotel bar, but she is not interested. However, after a violent encounter with a client, she changes her mind, allowing Mitch to accompany her and provide security.

Mitch learns that Natalie (aka 'Victoria') also tutors school children in mathematics. She takes him home, where he meets Dana, her roommate and fellow sex-worker. Baffled as to why the educated and good-looking Natalie is an escort, she explains it is pay off student loans quickly.

Before Natalie and Mitch can go out to the bar, she insists he dress more smartly, so he does not attract attention. When they arrive, she asks him to stay in the background, so nobody notices him. Mitch should only come forward if someone gives her problems.

Natalie and Mitch spend the next day getting to know each other. They go to a nail salon, then later play video games, all the while he asks her details. Natalie explains how she became an escort. Dana was already working as one, so she started with her pimp. Soon, Natalie decided she preferred to cut out the middle man, as he takes half the cut.

Mitch gets uncomfortable when Natalie has to call him over to get some aggressive guys off of her. He almost quits, but she reminds him he can produce a great article with what he learns. Mitch excuses himself to go, as his app has beeped. Natalie follows him, discovering his secret.

When Natalie finds out about Mitch's sex addiction, they become friends. They connect over their shared experiences as very sexually active people. They both talk about their feelings about going to the clinic for STD test scares.

When Mitch goes to visit his father and sister, he takes Natalie along, presenting her as his girlfriend. She stands up for him when his father puts him down for not having achieved much. Natalie later tells him that she was Internet-bullied because of a sex journal she wrote in college, so cannot get a regular job.

They have sex that night, following a kiss after Natalie reveals she never kisses clients. Mitch later shows signs of jealousy when he accompanies her to her next clients. He picks a fight with one of them, and he and Natalie have a falling out. Mitch later confesses his feelings for her and tries to make up with her, but she refuses.

At first, Mitch does not want to go through with his article about Natalie, but the editor encourages him to. The story becomes a success, which impresses his father. Mitch gets the job and joins a self-help group for his sex addiction.

Finally, Natalie contacts Mitch, telling him that she has given up prostitution, is enrolled in an MBA program and intends to start a legitimate tutoring business. She admits she loves him too, and they kiss, starting a relationship.

== Cast ==
- Lyndsy Fonseca as Natalie (aka Victoria)
- Michael Doneger as Mitch
- Tommy Dewey as JP
- Bruce Campbell as Charles
- Rachel Resheff as Emily
- Rumer Willis as Dana
- Steven Ogg as Warren
- Iqbal Theba as Richard

== Reception ==
According to Sheri Linden of Variety, Michael Doneger and his co-star Lyndsy Fonseca in The Escort "played with charm... and their mercenary alliance proceeds as a spirited, mostly convincing, exploration of life in the big city."

== Awards and nominations ==
- 2015 Los Angeles Film Festival
  - Nominated — LA Muse Award (Will Slocombe)
