= Wasted on the Young =

- Theatrical film poster
- Directed by: Ben C. Lucas
- Written by: Ben C. Lucas
- Produced by: Janelle Landers; Aidan O'Bryan
- Starring: Oliver Ackland; Adelaide Clemens; Alex Russell
- Cinematography: Dan Freene
- Edited by: Leanne Cole
- Music by: Geri Green; Chris Rollans
- Distributed by: Paramount Pictures
- Release dates: 13 June 2010 (Sydney); 3 March 2011 (Australia)
- Running time: 97 minutes
- Country: Australia
- Language: English
- Box office: $138,724

Wasted on the Young is a 2011 Australian thriller film directed by Ben C. Lucas and starring Oliver Ackland, Adelaide Clemens, and Alex Russell. Shot by cinematographer Dan Freene, it tells the story of a traumatic high school incident that sets off a fatal chain of events for two brothers. The film was shot in 2009 at an ultra modern mansion in City Beach and at Edith Cowan University's Mount Lawley and Joondalup campuses. The film received $750,000 in ScreenWest funding through its West Coast Visions initiative, as well as funding from Screen Australia.

== Plot ==
Darren is a quiet, introverted teenager who attends a prestigious high school along with his popular and wealthy step-brother Zack. A girl named Xandrie has a crush on him, and decides to attend one of Zack's elaborate house parties to spend more time with him. At the party, Xandrie meets Zack and he notices her interest in Darren. Xandrie fails to meet up with Darren and is intercepted by Zack's friends Karenn and Simone, who offer her a spiked drink. Xandrie is taken to the basement, where she passes out and is left alone with Zack and his friends, Brook and Jonathan. She wakes up at a beach and goes home after discovering she was raped. The next morning, Darren discovers Xandrie's phone in the basement, and is unable to find her at school. He meets up with Ella, Xandrie's friend who was with her at the party, but got separated from her and doesn't know where she is.

Darren gets no answer from Zack and instead follows Jonathan. He denies Darren an answer and is beaten up by him as a result. Darren tracks Xandrie's home address and visits her, but she doesn't answer her door. Xandrie eventually shows up at school and discovers her reputation is destroyed by false rumors surrounding her disappearance. Karenn threatens her, saying how the majority are more likely to believe their story than hers due to Zack's wealth and reputation. Darren decides to find out what really happened to her and hacks into Jonathan's laptop. He is sick to discover footage of Xandrie's assault. At school, Darren finds Xandrie and tries to help her, but she refuses and tells him she passed out when it happened and has no concrete evidence. Zack pays Xandrie a visit and warns her about divulging the truth, as it could affect their chances of graduating.

Xandrie and Darren soon reconcile. Brook convinces Zack that Darren knows the truth and might discredit them both. Zack has Brook corner him before beating him up. Bloodied, he is taken outside by Brook and Jonathan while Xandrie shows up with a gun, contemplating about killing Zack. He tells her that shooting him won't change a thing—they will still believe his story more than hers. Despaired, Xandrie shoots herself instead.

To secure his reputation, Zack soon throws another party. Filled with angst, Darren shows up at the party and makes Simone feel guilty about Xandrie's suicide, and convinces her to drug Zack's drink. Darren also spreads the footage of Xandrie's assault to everyone in the party through their phones. Brook finds out about this and confronts Darren, who hits him in the head with a bottle. The partygoers question Zack about the truth and he blames it on Brook and Jonathan, who overhear him outside. Soon, the drug in his drink takes effect. He follows Darren (whom he sees as Xandrie) in the basement, where he passes out. He wakes up bound in one of two seats before a device Darren had engineered. Darren tells him that the partygoers will decide which one of them should die via their phones, as they are seen on the televisions around the house, placing a gun on the device, which will shoot one of them depending on the votes. He sits beside Zack in one of the seats, and the gun later shoots.

Darren is later shown swimming in a pool at some kind of a facility.

== Cast ==
- Oliver Ackland as Darren
- Adelaide Clemens as Xandrie
- Alex Russell as Zack
- Patrick Cullen as Shay
- Rhondda Findleton as Cassandra
- Georgina Haig as Simone
- Geraldine Hakewill as Ella
- T.J. Power as Brook
- Tom Stokes as Jonathan
- Kym Thorne as Karenn

== Box office ==
The world premiere of the film occurred at the 2010 Sydney Film Festival, on 13 June 2010, where it was the only Australian film entered. The film was also screened at the Toronto International Film Festival, the Pusan International Film Festival, the South by Southwest Film Festival and the Torino Film Festival.

The film had its theatrical release to cinema in Australian on 3 March 2011 and grossed $52,118 on its opening week in the Australia cinemas.

== Reception ==
Wasted on the Young received mixed to positive reviews, earning a Rotten Tomatoes approval rating of 60% from 20 reviews.

Thomas Caldwell of Cinematic Autopsy gave the film a positive review, calling it "a slick and striking film that presents a disturbingly recognisable world of plutocratic rule in the dark heart of Australian society." Glenn Dunks said the film's "pulsating soundtrack, immediate direction by first time filmmaker Lucas ... and Leanne Cole's hectic editing all lend the film a vibrancy that is sorely lacking in a lot of cinema these days." Luke Buckmaster of Crikey called the film a "scorching ultra modern morality fable that uses school grounds, party houses and internet connections as stomping grounds for social allegory."

Beth Wilson of Trespass gave a negative review, saying "the plot falls short of its director's aspirations, and given his obvious filmic talents this is all the more disappointing." Marc Fennell of Triple J called it "Visually impressive, but the script needed a big angry red pen taken to it. Oh, and does every character need to shuffle around like they're in a My Chemical Romance video clip?" Alice Tynan of Concrete Playground called the film "Part romantic tragedy, part ruthless thriller, Wasted on the Young is an impressive but ultimately unsettling cinematic experience."

=== Accolades ===
Award	Category	Subject	Result
AACTA Awards (1st)	Best Editing	Leanne Cole	Nominated
Sydney Film Festival	Best Film	Ben C. Lucas	Nominated

== See also ==
- Cinema of Australia
