= We Love Our Lamb =

Australian marketing campaign

The We Love Our Lamb campaign is a domestic marketing campaign launched by Meat and Livestock Australia (MLA), with the aim of promoting lamb meat consumption and purchase primarily through comedic means.

The campaign is a continuation strategy – a method of scheduling advertising at regular intervals – established in 1999 to promote and celebrate lamb in conjunction with Australia Day. The campaign seeks to position lamb as the 'national meat' on Australia Day in order to suggest an affiliation between lamb and barbecues, historically associated with the end-of-summer holiday. Since 1999, MLA has worked with Australian marketing and communications agency The Monkeys, along with other specialised consultants, to run the campaign on a yearly basis. In more recent times, the campaign has become well known for its tongue-in-cheek humour and its use of Sam Kekovich, an ex-AFL footballer who has been positioned as Australia's 'Lambassador.'

== Goals ==
The overall purpose of the MLA 'We love our Lamb' campaign is to drive the consumer demand and sales for Australian lamb through promoting lamb as Australia's national dish. As well as advertisement that runs across platforms spanning television, online and social media channels, the 'We Love our Lamb' campaign continues to utilise several other elements in order to ensure they keep meeting consumer demand. Such platforms include outdoor advertising, a variety of product-focused point-of-sale promotions across retailers and an ongoing media broadcast partnership with Channel Nine including promotion throughout Channel Nine's Summer of Cricket. The domestic marketing campaign remains the largest market for Australian Lamb consumption, with lamb contributing to a low purchase frequency in relation to its counterparts. Reportedly, these campaigns are important to securing continued and ongoing support for lamb for consumers, retailers and foodservices.

Historically, the MLA Lamb campaign was seasonal in its approach – with marketing restricted to Spring – when product supply, demand and quality was at its best. With advancements in supply chains and production methods, lamb became readily available all year round. To achieve a year-round presence, the MLA sought to leverage public holidays, occasions and events. The campaign has progressed since its inception in 1999, with its initial aim of highlighting the "injustice" of American tariffs on Australian Lamb, beseeching people to support domestic farmers by eating more lamb. Since then, not only has the campaign reportedly succeeded in terms of sales, however, the campaign has identified the 'Australian-ness' of Lamb.

== Challenges ==
From the outset, the campaign was faced with challenges pertaining to a surge in lamb prices, retailers' expectations, stagnant marketing funds and laws of diminishing returns. In real terms, both sheep and lamb prices have risen in nominal terms and have subsequently increased in the last three decades. Quarterly retail prices for lamb rose by 93% from 2000. In short, the 2000s was a decade characterised by volatility and a rising in lamb prices. Driven by stronger export demand and severe droughts conditions, the campaigns primary challenge was to advertise an expensive product.

Additionally, the financials in relation to the delivery of the campaign was costly. As illustrated in the graph below, the overall cost of the campaign was steep. However, the investment into the public holiday, coupled with an alleged, niche marketing campaign has delivered outstanding results. Between the years of 2007 and 2009, the advert was held accountable for generating a total return on investment of $8.04 for every dollar spent, amounting to an incremental revenue of $29.3 million.

Budget/Year	Media	ATL Production	Retail POS Production	PR	Total
2007	$850K	$120K	$120K	$100K	$1.19m
2008	$850K	$110K	$130K	$110K	$1.2m
2009	$950K	$120K	$130K	$60K	$1.26m

== Ambassadors ==
=== Sam Kekovich ===
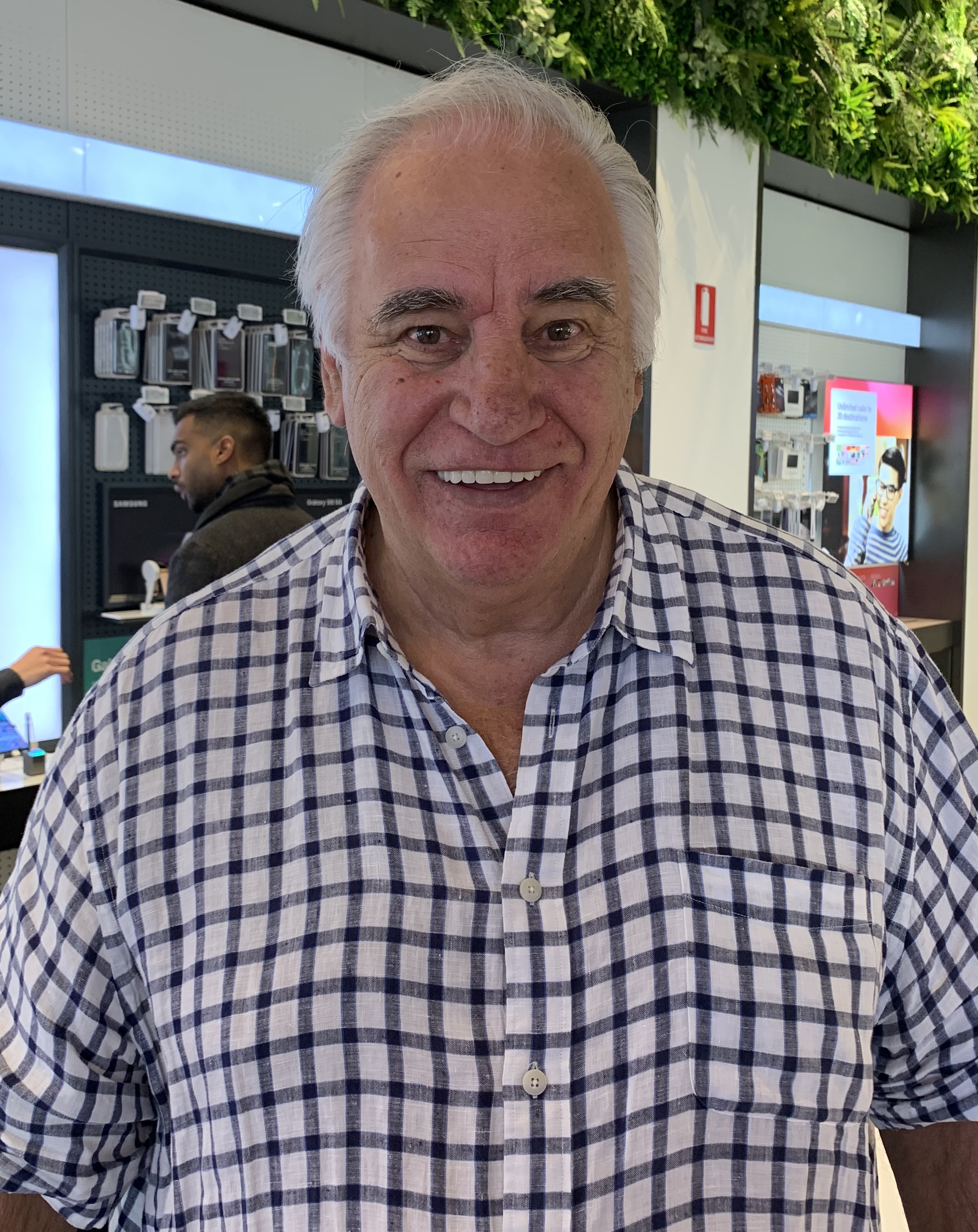
Sam Kekovich

Sam Kekovich has upheld his lively persona into the media sector, being rewarded for his 'rants' across several platforms such as the ABC show, The Fat, pre-match AFL coverage on Triple M, Melbourne radio station 3AK, as a radio presenter on Melbourne Sports Radio Station SEN 1116 and on PTI Australia on ESPN. From 2005 to 2014, Kekovich was crowned the 'Lambassador' and headed the Australia-day-eve advertising campaign for the MLA, encouraging people to eat more Lamb. The way in which Kekovich delivered the advertisements were in a style of Kekovich deadpan rants and had the tendency to make outlandish and insensitive statements that were prevalent to the given time period.

=== Richie Benaud ===
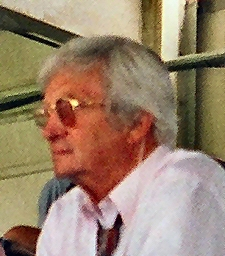
Richie Benaud during his media career

Australian cricketer turned TV personality Richie Benaud was enlisted to work alongside the Lambassador Sam Kekovich as well as several other national icons encouraging all Australians to 'host a barbie' and unite over lamb on Australia Day. Throughout the annual Australia Day lamb commercial, directed by Tom Noakes, Benaud exudes the spirit of the national day in doing what he believes every Australian should be doing — hosting a lamb BBQ accompanied by a game of backyard cricket.

The "Richie's BBQ" Australia Day campaign ad and his first appearance, developed by independent media agency The Monkeys, opens at sea, aboard Captain Cook's ship approaching the Australian shoreline. The scene is then interrupted by a phone call from Benaud inviting him to a lamb BBQ at his place on Australia Day. Cook agrees, and, to further exploit the lack of temporal integrity, he continues to extend the invitation to his fellow explorers Burke and Wills — who are keen to join despite their mortal situation in a baking hot desert.

== History ==
When efforts to reinvent and reposition lamb as a modern meat for the Australian market started to lose traction, a new challenge arose to "modernise the consumption of lamb". In response to the challenge of marketing lamb, in 1999 the MLA began the "We Love Our Lamb" campaign to centralise mainstream cuts and attempted to rekindle consumer demands by appealing to families.

=== Summer Lamb ad 2016 ===
The advertisement, that stars former reporter Lee Lin Chin, is centred around the idea of bringing Australian expatriates home for Australia day. The ad serves as a reminding the expatriates that "lamb brings people together" on the national holiday. Chin stars as the commander in charge of Project Boomerang and tells of the ill-fated Australia Day 'without a char-grilled chop in sight' she had spent in Warsaw in 1996. She vowed that it would never happen again and subsequently built an army composed of Australian icons including the likes of Sam Kekovich, radio personalities Fitzy and Wippa, former Australian rugby union captain Stephen Moore and Australian fast bowler Mitchell Johnson.

=== Summer Lamb ad 2017 ===
The Meat and Livestocks 2017 Australia Day Lamb advertisements – which notably does not mention Australia Day – opens to an Australian coastline, as the protagonists of the advert are in search for the perfect spot to fire up a barbie, However, it is only a matter of time before other revellers join the hosts. The ad primarily focuses on an indigenous family at a beach barbecue dealing with historical arrivals in Australia. The advertisement goes on to welcome European settlers - namely James Cook - that arrive via boat and proceed to join to party, shortly followed by a sea of new immigrants that include members from the First Fleet, the French, The Russians, Greeks, Chinese, Italians and even inclusive of Australia most recent migrants, all holding food and gifts to add to the barbecue.

The "You Never Lamb Alone" that was shot by director Paul Middleditch, the Meat and Livestock Association's 2017 Australia Day Lamb advertisement is allegedly a song of praise to Australian diversity and multiculturalism . The clip features the likes of Sam Kekovich, Australian sprinter Cathy Freeman, former Australian rugby representative Wendell Sailor, Australia's MasterChef culinary finalist Poh Ling Yeow, Australian cricketer Adam Gilchrist and LGBTQ comedian Rhys Nicholson alongside a list of Australian extras.

=== Summer Lamb ad 2019 ===
The MLA "We Love our Lamb" Summer campaign for Australian Lamb in 2019 launched with an underlying message calling upon Australia and New Zealand to unite over a lamb on the barbecue. Building on the renewed 'Share the Lamb' platform, the consolidated campaign used 'rosemary sprig' imagery to increase lamb consumption in both Australia and New Zealand, whilst appealing to a commonly perceived unity between the two nations.

As such, the advertisement campaign features a new long-form advert, which dates back to 1900 when first Australian Prime Minister, Edmund Barton, is concluding the Constitution Act, making New Zealand part of the Commonwealth. This actual moment in history then inspires two fictitious modern day Australian politicians in the advert to merge both Australia and New Zealand. On this premise, the two set for both nations to unite over a lamb barbecue, satirically among a floating party in the middle of the Tasman Sea.

== Reception ==
According to critics, the MLA 'We love our Lamb' campaign has proven to be the most successful campaign of its type. This is largely seen in its reported record increase in lamb sales throughout the entirety of the Australia Day period. Since its production, the longstanding campaign has become more 'iconic as lamb itself and each year it is designed to encourage consumers to come together to celebrate Australia Day with lamb.'

Year	Media exposure in advertising-equivalent dollars	Audience / Circulation
2007	$4.9m	85,077,583
2008	$5m without Australian Open serves; $6.3m with	71,094,277/105,433,859
2009	$3m	50,504,520

The campaign produced a 34.4 per cent increase in sales as opposed to its weekly average for the week preceding Australia Day. Additionally, a 39.5 per cent hike in sales versus its weekly average for the week that hosts Australia Day. Overall, this amounts to 36.9 per cent sales increase throughout the 'We Love our Lamb' campaign entirety, proving to be the most successful advertising campaign for The Monkeys Production Group on record. Regarding the 2007 advertisement, the video itself was viewed over 5.5 million times online and has continued to grow. Since the videos publication, campaign has generated 1274 media articles which in turn has been delivered to a cumulative audience that exceeds 404 million.

The 2016 "We Love our Lamb" commercial promoting Australian lamb which was heavily criticised by the Hindu community, with claims from the international religious body stating that the advertisement was 'insensitive ad poking fun at deity Ganesha.' As part of its 'You Never Lamb Alone' pitch, sees an Australian Barbecue with religious figures including Jesus, Buddha, Zeus, Aphrodite, Moses, and the Hindu god Ganesha. The god is only referred to in the ad as the 'butt of the joke,' with the religious icons joking about 'addressing the elephant in the room?' With that in mind, Ganesha commonly referred to as a vegetarian, and the god's presence in a campaign that promotes meat has reportedly angered Hindus in Australia and even more so internationally. The president of the Universal Society of Hinduism, Rajan Zed, claimed that the ad could potentially have an adverse effect on meat sales overseas.

Additionally, while the MLA has claimed that the response to the 'You'll Never Lamb Alone' campaign was for the most part positive, some in the Indigenous community have claimed that the advert is highly offensive. The aforementioned campaign that depicts early settlement has seen viewers taken umbrage at the complete commission of references to Australia Day, while others within the Indigenous community have since criticised the advert. During the advert, as Dutch, English, German and other early settlers alike arrive, their interaction between indigenous and non-indigenous people has reportedly tried to make light of Australia's past few years.
