= Blinder (film) =

- Theatrical release poster
- Directed by: Richard Gray
- Screenplay by: Richard Gray; Scott Didier; Michele Davis-Gray
- Produced by: Glenn Archer; Adrian Gleeson; Sam Kekovich
- Starring: Oliver Ackland; Rose McIver; Anna Hutchison; Jack Thompson; Angus Sampson
- Cinematography: Greg De Marigny
- Edited by: Christopher Kroll
- Music by: Alies Sluiter
- Production company: Revival Film Company
- Distributed by: Revival Film Company
- Release date: 7 March 2013
- Running time: 109 minutes
- Country: Australia
- Language: English
- Budget: $5 million
- Box office: $49,000

Blinder is a 2013 Australian sports drama film directed by Richard Gray and starring Oliver Ackland, Rose McIver, Anna Hutchison and Jack Thompson. The film is a football drama set predominantly in Torquay, Victoria. The film is about Tom Dunn, an aspiring football star who flees Australia following a scandal. Dunn returns to Australia to restore his reputation.

== Plot ==
The Torquay Tigers are a successful team playing in the Bellarine Football League. Their coach Charlie "Chang" Hyde has guided the team into their first Grand Final in seven years. There is talk that the team's best three players, Dunn, Mortimer and Regan, may get drafted by one or more AFL clubs. On the eve of the match the coach drops star player Tom Dunn for poor attitude. The club is successful and wins the flag. Dunn feels left out of the celebrations and strikes up a friendship with Rose Walton, whose younger sister Sammy, (McIver) is part of the team's support staff, carrying water for the players.

The following year, Torquay again plays off for the Grand Final and manage a come-from-behind win. At the after-match celebration party, young Sammy has underage sex with Mortimer. Dunn, who had been told by Rose to look out for her sister, is drugged by a spiked drink and passes out. The local paper publishes photos of the night with the out-of-control party, and the team goes from heroes to zeros overnight. The scandal that follows rips the team apart, with Dunn leaving for America. Only Regan gets drafted; the other two don't because the major league clubs don't want to be caught up in the scandal.

Ten years later Chang collapses and dies while addressing the players during a match on the eve of the finals; Dunn returns from America for the funeral and to face his demons, the girlfriend who scorns him and his best friend. Feeling uneasy about being in his hometown after many years, Dunn finds that the townfolk haven't forgotten him or the scandal. Rose has moved on and married but still is bitter towards him.

Regan, whose football career was ruined by injury has returned to be Changs's assistant. Encouraged to take over the team, he asks Dunn and Mortimer to assist him as he coaches the team into the finals.

== Cast ==
- Angus Sandner as "The Steamtrain
- Aidan Testro as The 'Testman'
- Christopher Christies as "The Hulk"
- Jack Thompson as Coach Charlie 'Chang' Hyde
- Ashton Luu as 'Ray Pissed'
- Christian Marchionno as 'The Dog Whisperer'
- Bobby Morley as Nick Regan
- Zoe Carides as Ally Dunn
- Aaron Jakubenko as Dawson
- Jeremy Stanford as President

== Production and release ==
The film was scheduled to have a 10-week shoot beginning 20 February 2012 in Torquay, Victoria, Australia, before moving to Boston, Massachusetts.

Well Go USA released Blinder in US theaters and on digital HD simultaneously on 7 November 2014.

== Reception ==
Blinder was a box-office flop, taking $47,394 on its opening weekend. The film was shown on 99 screens, giving it an average of $478 per screen.

The film was negatively reviewed by critics. SBS critic Don Groves gave the film 2 stars out of 5, saying it was "an uninspiring, B-grade effort". Film critic Luke Buckmaster, writing for Crikey, said, "Without a trace of self-awareness, Blinder stakes its claim as one of the most perverse twists on sports movie conventions you will ever see, earnestly inviting the audience to join the on field 'excitement' and – wait for it – to egg on suspected sex offenders."

== See also ==
Cinema of Australia
