= Brampton's Own =

- Film poster
- Directed by: Michael Doneger
- Written by: Michael Doneger
- Produced by: Michael Doneger; Mark DiCristofaro
- Starring: Alex Russell; Rose McIver; Jean Smart
- Cinematography: Kieren Murphy
- Edited by: Brad McLaughlin
- Music by: Mitchell Owens
- Production companies: Cloverhill Pictures; Perspective Productions
- Distributed by: Dark Star Pictures
- Release date: October 19, 2018
- Running time: 89 minutes
- Country: United States
- Language: English

Brampton's Own is a 2018 baseball drama film written and directed by Michael Doneger, starring Alex Russell, Rose McIver, and Jean Smart. The story follows Dustin Kimmel, a 30-year-old minor league prospect for the Seattle Mariners who reconnects with his high school sweetheart during the off season. It is Doneger's debut film in both the writing and directing roles.

== Plot ==
Dustin Kimmel (Russell) is a minor league catcher for the Triple-A Tacoma Rainiers in the Seattle Mariners organization and has played in their farm system for the past 12 years. At the end of the season, he is not included in the major league recruitment and is forced to confront the promise he made his family to retire if he wasn't in the major leagues by the age of 30. Dustin's girlfriend, Emma (Voelkel), breaks up with him because their relationship hasn't progressed and he prioritizes his career over her. Dustin's return home is full of surprises: his high school sweetheart Rachel Kinley (McIver) has become engaged to the town's new dentist, Eddie (Porter), his mother is moving in with her boyfriend Bart (Getz), he befriends Bart's young son, and most of his childhood friends have grownup.

Another player's injury offers Dustin a chance at the major leagues and he faces difficult choices.

== Cast ==
- Alex Russell as Dustin Kimmel
- Rose McIver as Rachel Kinley
- Jean Smart as Judy Kimmel
- Kevin Linehan as Gavin Phillips
- Spencer Grammer as Jane Kimmel
- Scott Porter as Eddie

== Reception ==
Brampton's Own received a 40% rating on Rotten Tomatoes, based on five reviews with an average rating of 5.8/10. The Hollywood Reporter's John DeFore writes, "While the film effectively captures Dustin's ambivalence and melancholy about giving up on baseball, the love story isn't nearly persuasive, and Dustin's core failure as a person...just feels like a device lifted from bigger sports dramas." The Los Angeles Times Kimber Myers writes, "It's better than a number of indie films in its craft - particularly the thoughtfully composed cinematography from Kieran Murphy - but a flawed script ultimately keeps it from eking out a win."

The film was screened at the Woods Hole Film Festival Dinner and a Movie series.

== See also ==
- List of baseball films
