= Eastern Young Cattle Indicator =

Price index of Australian cattle markets

The Eastern Young Cattle Indicator (EYCI) is an indicator of general cattle markets in Australia. It is calculated based on a seven-day rolling price average expressed in cents per kilogram carcase (or dressed) weight (¢/kg cwt). The EYCI sources data from 23 saleyards in New South Wales, Queensland and Victoria.

It is produced by Meat and Livestock Australia and includes; vealer and yearling steers and heifers purchased for slaughter, restocking or lotfeeding.

Only cattle meeting the following criteria are included:

- C2 or C3 muscle and fat score,
- 200 kg+ live weight

== Performance ==
Severe drought across large parts of eastern and inland Australia between 2017 and 2019, saw the national beef herd reach its lowest levels since 1990. Following this, cattle supply and market throughput has reduced which has been reflected in record high cattle prices. On the 28th of August, 2021 the EYCI recorded its highest price at 1,031.52¢/kg cwt. While the EYCI does not reflect each eastern state cattle market, it provides a comprehensive indicator of the underlying beef supply and demand trends.

In July 2015, Meat and Livestock Australia developed the Western Young Cattle Indicator as an equivalent of the EYCI for West Australian cattle producers.
