= Alex Russell (actor) =

Australian actor (born 1987)

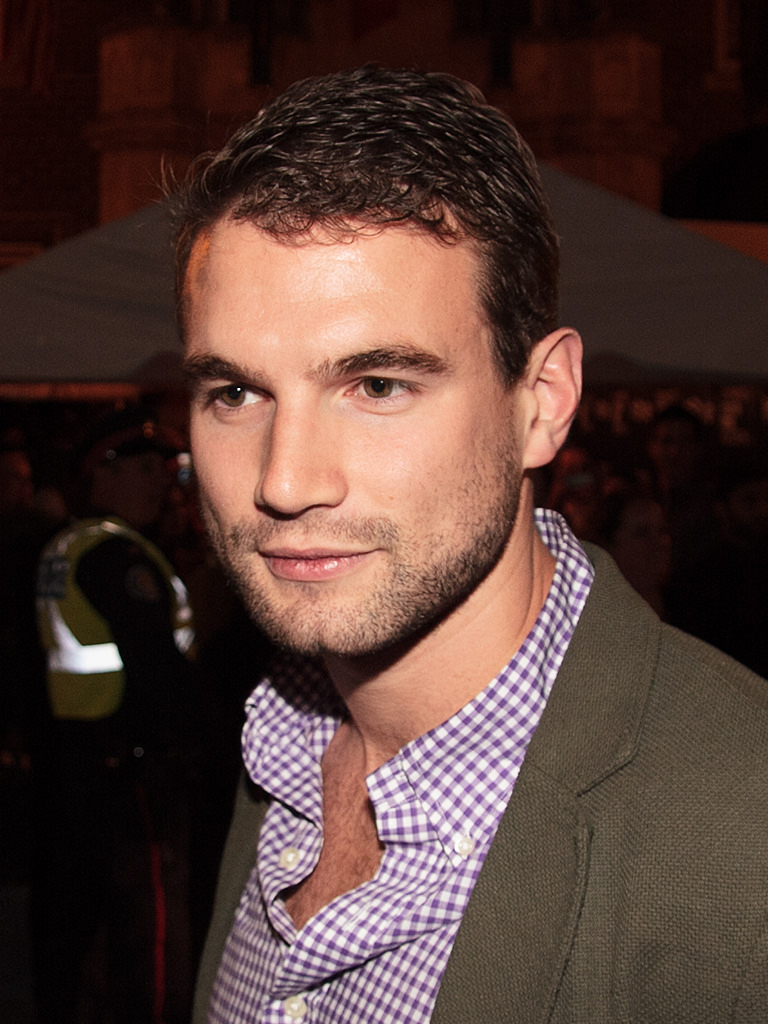
- Alex Russell at the 2014 Toronto International Film Festival
- Born: Alexander Andrew Russell; 11 December 1987 (age 38); Brisbane, Queensland, Australia
- Education: National Institute of Dramatic Art (BFA)
- Years active: 2008–present
- Spouse: Diana Hooper (m. 2022)

Alexander Andrew Russell (born 11 December 1987) is an Australian actor and director. He made his film debut in the thriller film Wasted on the Young (2011) before his breakout with a starring role in the found footage superhero film Chronicle (2012).

Russell had starring roles in the films Bait 3D (2012) and Believe Me (2014), and supporting roles in the films The Host (2013), Carrie (2013), and Unbroken (2014). In the mid-to-late 2010s, Russell starred in the films Goldstone (2016) and Jungle (2017), and had a supporting role in the biographical film Only the Brave (2017). He had a main role as Jim Street on the first six seasons of the CBS action drama television series S.W.A.T. (2017–2025).

== Early life and education ==
Alexander Andrew Russell was born on 11 December 1987 in Brisbane and grew up in Rockhampton, Queensland. He is the son of bariatric and general surgeon Andrew Russell and interior designer Frances Russell who also own Capricorn Bariatric & General Surgery in Rockhampton, Australia. He has a younger brother, Dominic who also has an interest in directing films and works as a teacher as well. Alex also has a younger sister, Georgiana who is a content creator and PR consultant.

He finished studies at Rockhampton Grammar School in 2004 and afterward attended the National Institute of Dramatic Art (NIDA) in Sydney.

== Career ==
Russell made his debut in the 2010 film Wasted on the Young. In 2011, he appeared in two short films, The Best Man and Halloween Knight. He directed a short film as well, titled Love and Dating in L.A., which was featured on El Rey Network's Peoples Showcase: Horror Edition.

In 2012, Russell starred in Josh Trank's found footage science fiction film Chronicle, which was a critical and commercial success. A year later, he featured in Kimberly Peirce's remake of Stephen King's Carrie as Billy Nolan, a role originated by John Travolta. In 2014, he starred in the independent film Believe Me.

Five years after his TV debut as a guest star on NTSF:SD:SUV in 2012, Russell joined the main cast of the 2017 reboot of the 1975 series S.W.A.T. as Officer Jim Street, the role originally played by Robert Urich.

== Filmography ==
=== Film ===
Year	Title	Role	Notes
2010	Wasted on the Young	Zack	
2010	Almost Kings	Hass	
2012	Chronicle	Matt Garetty	
2012	Bait 3D	Ryan	
2013	The Host	Seeker Burns	
2013	Carrie	Billy Nolan	
2013	Love and Dating in L.A.	N/A	Short film; director
2014	Believe Me	Sam Atwell	
2014	Cut Snake	Sparra Farrell	
2014	Unbroken	Pete Zamperini	
2015	Prisoner of War	Bo	
2015	Pacific Standard Time	N/A	
2016	Goldstone	Josh	
2016	Blood in the Water	Percy	
2017	Only the Brave	Andrew Ashcraft	
2017	Jungle	Kevin	
2017	Rabbit	Ralph	
2018	Brampton's Own	Dustin	
2020	Under My Skin	Ryan	

=== Television ===
Year	Title	Role	Notes
2012	NTSF:SD:SUV	Stewie Mears	Episode: "16 Hop Street"
2015	Galyntine	Roman	Television film
2017–2024	S.W.A.T.	Jim Street	Main role, also director

=== Director ===
Year	Title	Notes
2021–2025	S.W.A.T.	"Safe House", "Witness", "SNAFU", "Devil Dog"
