= Meat & Livestock Australia =

Australian meat and livestock regulator

Meat & Livestock Australia Limited
- Trade name: Meat & Livestock Australia
- Type: Limited by guarantee
- Industry: Meat industry, livestock industry
- Founded: 1998
- Headquarters: North Sydney, Australia
- Key people: Managing Director: Jason Strong
- Services: Research and development, marketing, market access
- Revenue: ▼ A$ 269.7 million (2019–20)
- Number of employees: 333 (2020)
- Subsidiaries: Integrity Systems Company, MLA Donor Company
- Website: https://www.mla.com.au

Meat & Livestock Australia (M&LA) is an independent company which regulates standards for meat and livestock management in Australian and international markets. Headquartered in North Sydney, Australia; M&LA works closely with the Australian government, and the meat and livestock industries. M&LA has numerous roles across the financial, public and research sectors. The M&LA corporate group conducts research and offers marketing services to meat producers, government bodies and market analysts alike. Forums and events are also run by M&LA aim to provide producers with the opportunity to engage with other participants in the supply chain.

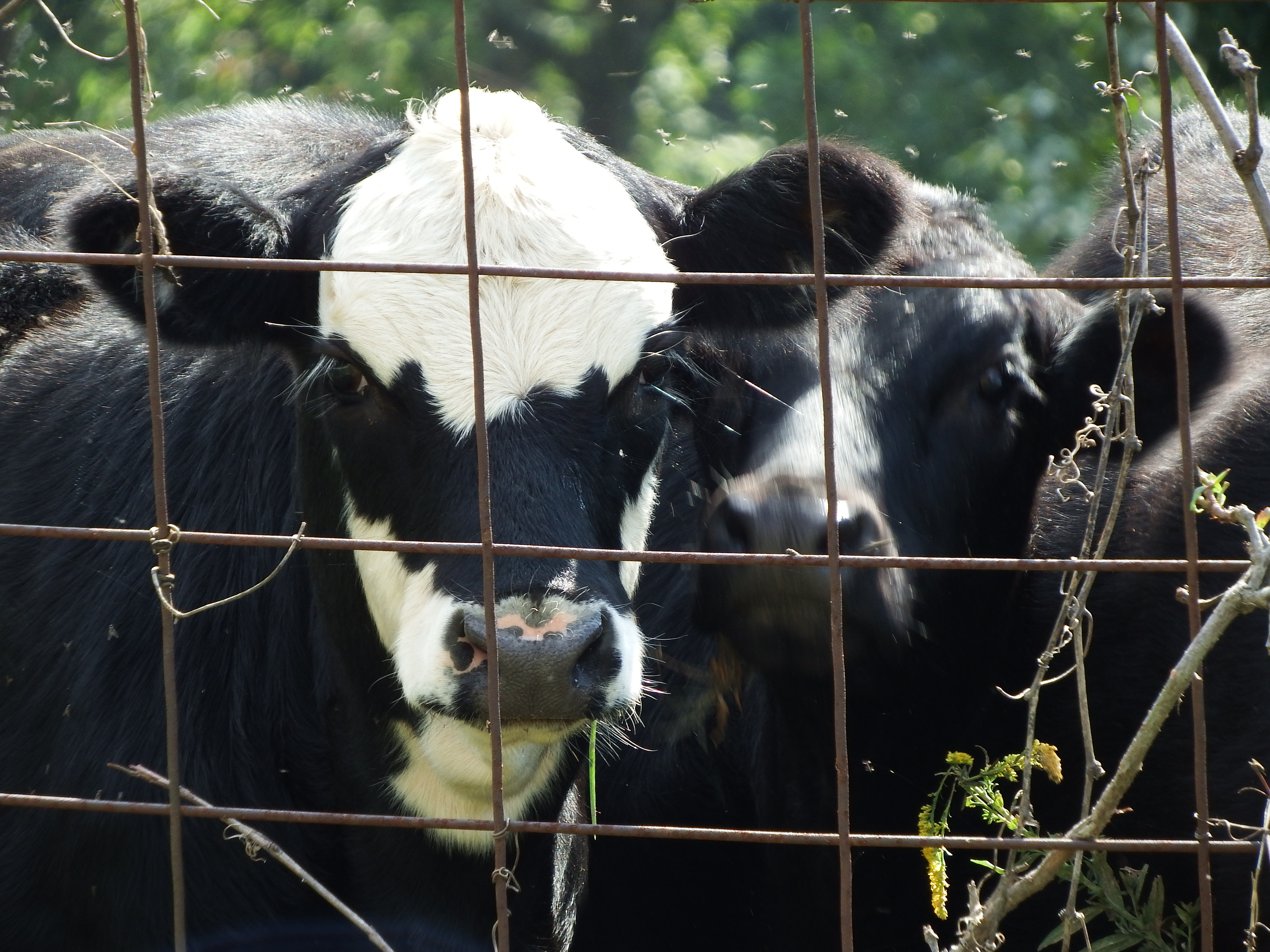
M&LA conducts research into red meat production and consumption in Australia.

The M&LA corporate group is led by Meat and Livestock Limited (M&LA Ltd.), which is the parent company of two subsidiaries that have diverse roles in the meat and livestock industry. The Integrity System Company (ISC) and the MLA Donor Company (MDC) are wholly owned subsidiaries of M&LA. Numerous studies into Australia's livestock production and marketing are funded or operated by M&LA. The corporate group also participates in environmental initiatives alongside government authorities and other research bodies, which aim to address the contribution of the livestock industry to climate change in Australia.

In its research and data analysis capacity, M&LA generates the Eastern Young Cattle Indicator (EYCI) and supports the implementation of Meat Standards Australia (MSA) in the Australian meat industry. M&LA also conducts educational programs regarding the production and consumption of red meat. Statutory obligations which have been imposed upon M&LA by the Australian government, require the corporate group to undergo regular independent reviews of its performance and efficiency. Marketing campaigns are produced by M&LA to promote red meat consumption; however, many advertisements have been subject to criticism, regarding cultural appropriation and discrimination allegations.

The Coronavirus (COVID-19) outbreak has disrupted economic markets and production globally. The COVID-19 pandemic has also impacted the revenue of the M&LA corporate group. In the 2019–20 financial year, M&LA produced an overall revenue of A$269.7 million. M&LA experienced a 0.1% drop in revenue compared to the 2018–19 financial year, in which the corporate group accumulated a total revenue of A$269.9 million.

== History ==
The M&LA group was created following the merger of Australian Meat and Livestock Corporation (AMLC) and Meat Research Corporation (MRC) which allowed for the privatisation of these government bodies in 1998. The M&LA corporate group was made responsible for the research and development functions of AMLC and the MRC goal to providing production support.

=== Meat and Livestock Australia Limited ===
Established in 1998, Meat and Livestock Limited (M&LA Ltd.) is an unlisted public company limited by guarantee. M&LA Ltd. consists of 333 employees as of 2020 and receives funding in the form of transaction levies. M&LA has been declared to be an 'industry body' under the Australian Meat and Live‑stock Industry Act 1997, which allows M&LA to collect such levies. A levy fee applies to animals or carcasses sold domestically or internationally by Australian producers under the Primary Industries (Excise) Levies Act 1999. This act outlines the circumstances in which producers are required to pay levies and provides the differing levy rates which apply to meat and livestock, including cattle, pigs and chickens.

As of 2020, 47,500 Australian meat producers held a majority of shareholdings in M&LA, which has given the company the status of being producer-owned. Livestock exporters and processors also fund M&LA Ltd. through the levies paid under contract. M&LA Ltd. primarily conducts research and offers marketing services on behalf of the M&LA organisation. The 'Australian Beef. The Greatest!' marketing campaign which was launched in 2017, strives to increase consumer engagement with the red meat industry and promote consumption by providing recipes which incorporate beef.

This company is also involved in encouraging international consumption of red meat through promotional competitions. In 2005, M&LA Ltd. launched a campaign in collaboration with Co-op Islami (Note: Co-op Islami has been a provider of frozen red meat and seafood in the United Arab Emirates since 1981. In 2006 the company rebranded, adopting a new logo and name change. It is now called Al Islami Foods and is a subsidiary of Dubai Cooperative Society.) to promote red meat consumption by families in the United Arab Emirates. The prize of the competition consisted of four tickets to Australia and a guided tour of Australian farms and processing facilities which adhere to Halal principles.

== Subsidiaries ==
=== Integrity Systems Company ===
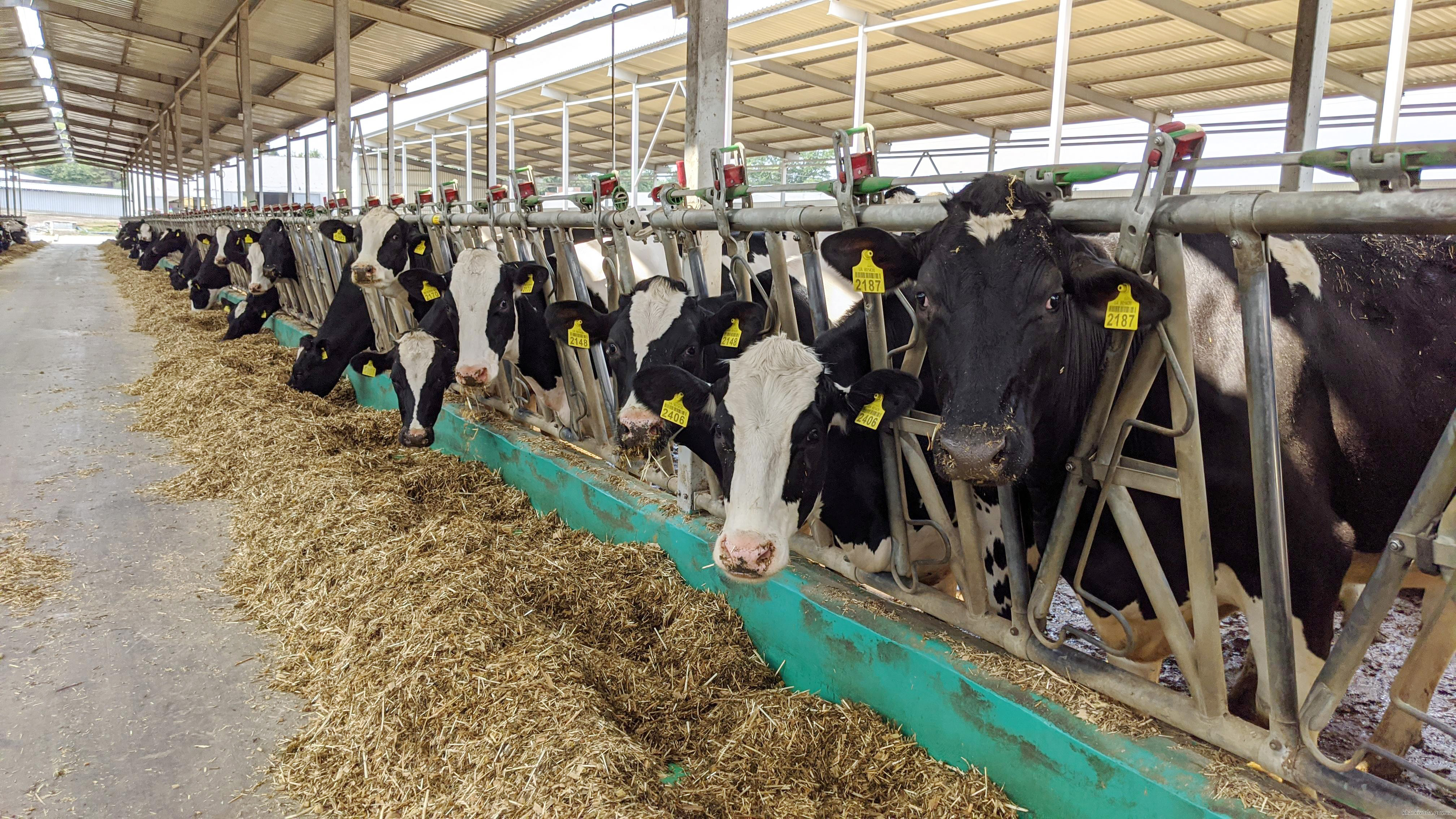
The NLIS program aims to improve transparency in the Australian livestock market.

Integrity Systems Company Limited (ISC) is a public company which was registered in 2009 and is wholly owned by M&LA Ltd. (Note: This company underwent a name change on 10 May 2017 to become 'Integrity Systems Company Limited'. Between its registration in 2009 and 2017, the company traded as 'National Livestock Identification System Limited'.) This company implements quality assurance programs and provides administrative assistance to programs delivered by the M&LA group. These include the National Vendor Declarations initiative (NVDs) and the National Livestock Identification System.

The NVDs system outlines requirements Australian livestock providers are required to adhere to. It prompts producers to establish a property biosecurity plan for every Property Identification Code (PIC) (Note: A PIC is an eight digit code provided to all vendors under the NVD system. This code allows government authorities to track the quantity of livestock inhibiting the vendor's property and grants access to information including the vendor details, the property name and address.) under their name. Providers must have completed an NVD declaration to legally transfer livestock across properties or to move livestock after a commercial sale. In 2020, ISC released an online declaration system which allowed for the lodgement of NVDs and other declarations required under MSA and animal health regulations. This initiative allows vendors to access and complete their declarations electronically, and aims to provide suppliers with a quick and efficient alternative to making paper declarations.

ISC also administers the NLIS, which provides background information on all Australian livestock. This system has established a national database which provides information on the residency of livestock and the other animals it has come in contact with. Where a vendor holds livestock that could potentially be a threat to buyers and their interests, ISC can assign one of the nine NLIS Early Warning statuses to the seller's PIC. These statuses must indicate the reason for the assignment of such a status, which is generally concerns surrounding the possibility of the livestock being exposed to a disease that could make it unsafe for human consumption. Notification of this status is then available to buyers with an NLIS account, which grants users access to the NLIS database. This system commenced in January 2020 and aims to support meat and livestock consumers by improving transparency in the domestic livestock market.

=== MLA Donor Company ===
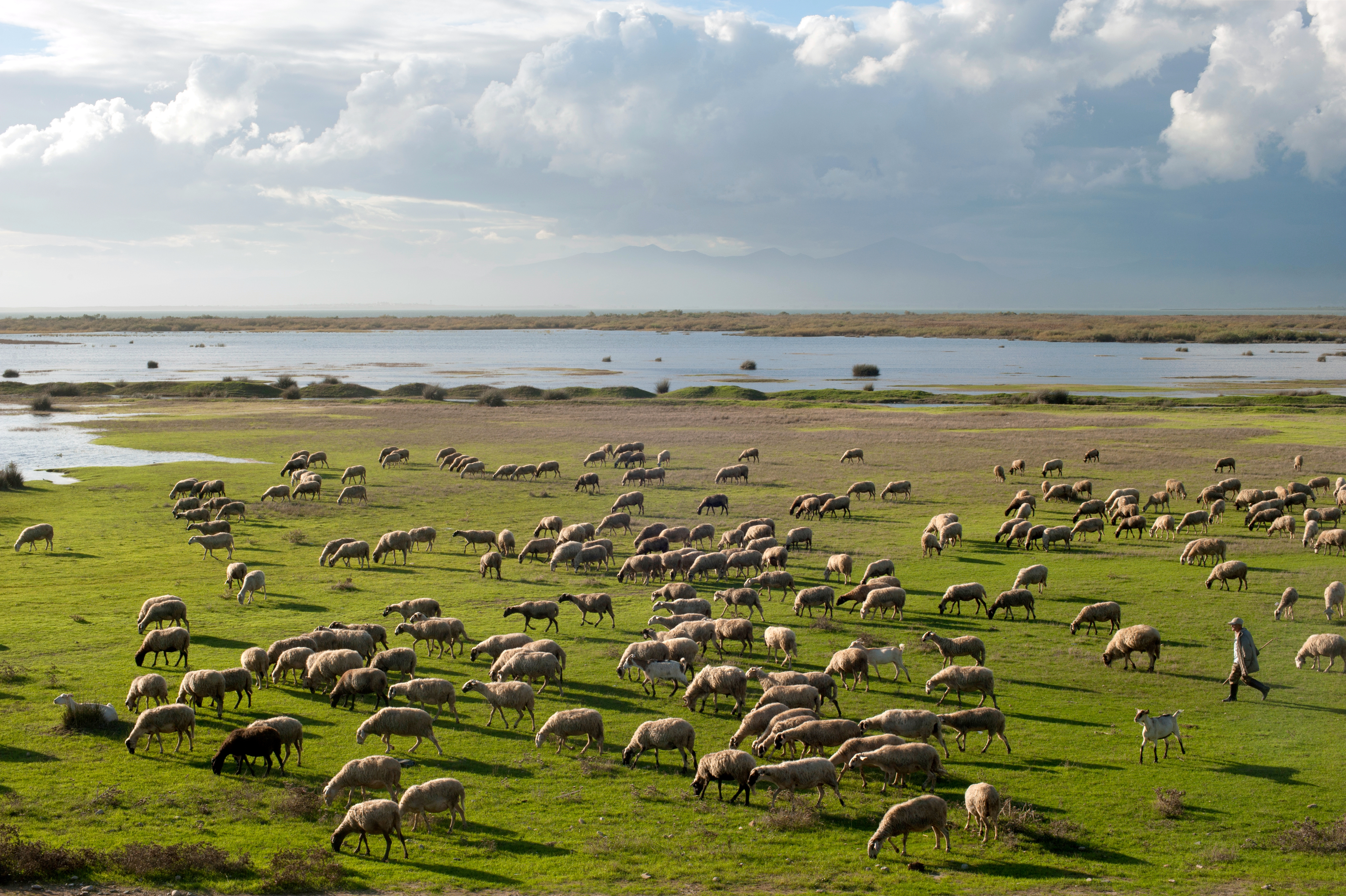
MLA Donor Company is classified as a 'donor body' under the Australian Meat and Livestock Industry Act 1997 (Cth).

MLA Donor Company Limited (MDC) is limited by guarantee and is wholly owned by M&LA Ltd. Established in 1998, MDC is funded by the Australian Federal Government and voluntary contributions by M&LA partners, including Australian universities and breeding companies. Under the Australian Meat and Livestock Industry Act 1997, MDC was declared to be an "approved donor body" in 1998. This declaration made MDC eligible to receive funding by the Commonwealth Government; the voluntary funds contributed to MDC for research and development is matched by the federal government. In 2016, the MDC received A$44 Million from the government in research and development grants. The Federal government is projected to grant A$94.628 million in 2020–21 to MDC for meat research purposes. MDC aims to encourage independent research and innovation in Australian red meat markets by providing financial assistance for independent companies and institutions conducting their own research. Launched in 2020, the BeefLinks partnership between the University of Western Australia and MDC conducts research on the red meat supply chain in Western Australia. The partnership also strives to develop innovative technologies to assist various participants in the red meat industry, including producers and vendors.

== Market indicators and standards ==
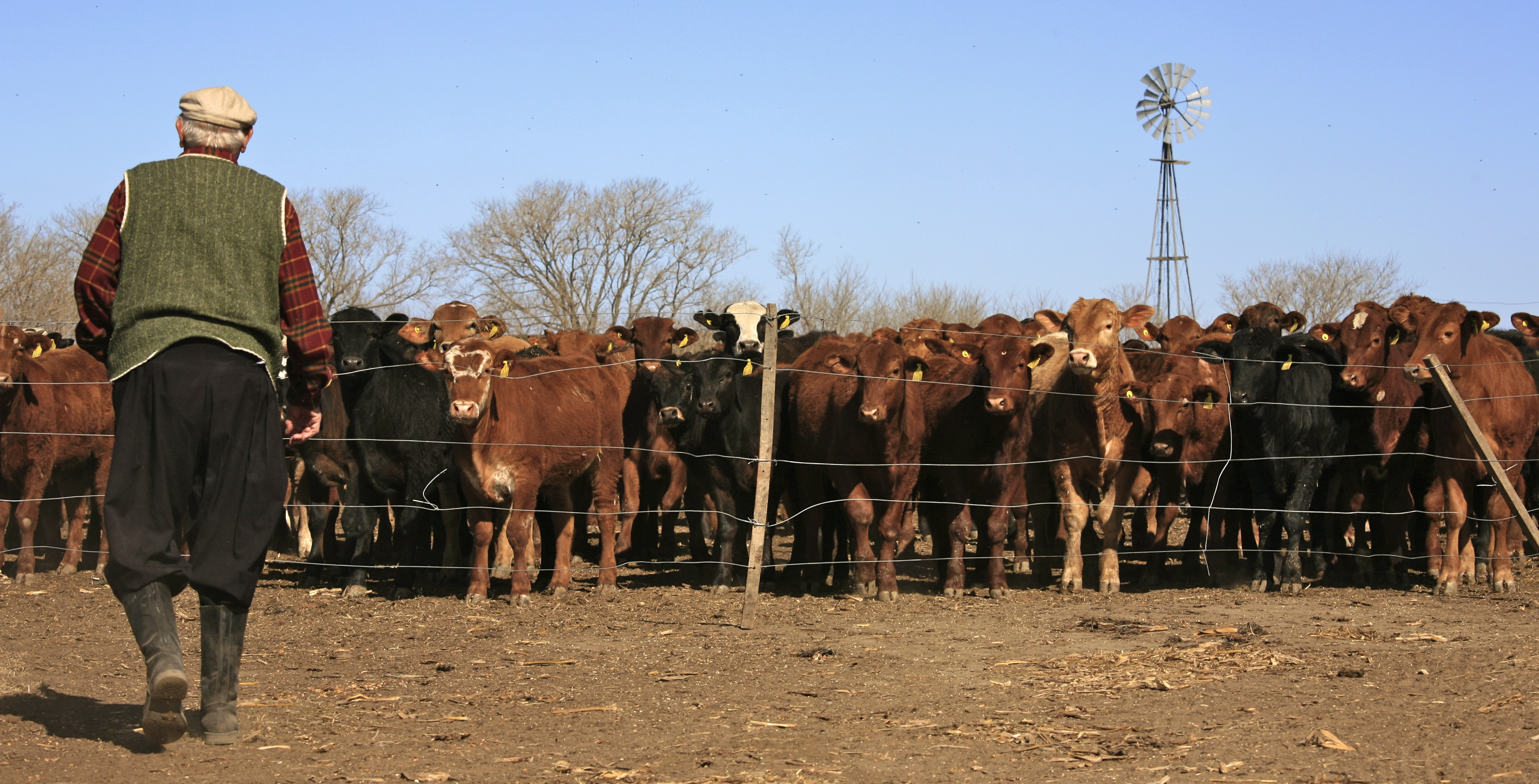
MLA Donor Company funds research which aims to improve the efficiency of production and management in the livestock industry.

M&LA aims to inform and advise producers, consumers and the Australian federal government on market conditions. M&LA collaborates with the Australian Bureau of Statistics to gather data on red meat consumers, which informs the marketing initiatives and programs implemented by M&LA. (Note: As a research and development body, M&LA provides data analysis and publications based on findings provided by the ABS.) As a research body, M&LA releases indicators and supports standards which aim to simplify complex market functions and inform consumers in the meat and livestock markets. The market standards endorsed by M&LA indicate the minimum meat and livestock requirements producers should aim to meet in Australia. It also provides a standard for the quality of Australian red meat in domestic and international markets.

=== Eastern Young Cattle Indicator ===
The Eastern Young Cattle Indicator (EYCI) is a market indicator produced by M&LA. It provides a weekly moving average of the number of young cattle sold across the Eastern states of Australia; Queensland, New South Wales and Victoria. The price and weight of the carcasses sold are employed to calculate the EYCI, which is exhibited in cents per kilogram. M&LA releases this indicator in conjunction with data analysis regarding its movement and market conditions, which is also conducted by M&LA. The EYCI aims to inform market commentary in the Australian meat market and provides producers with an indication of current market prices.

=== Meat Standards Australia ===
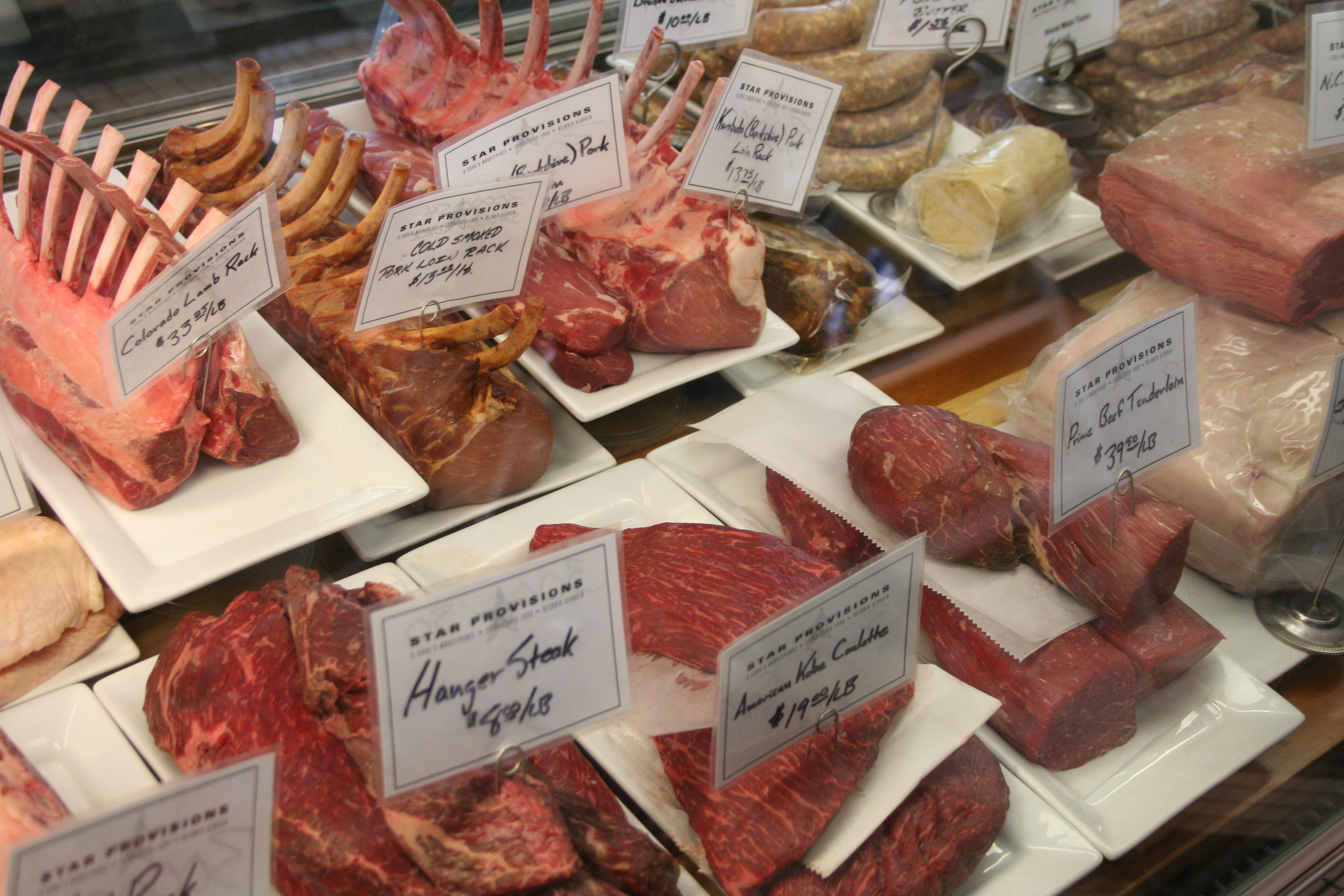
MSA aims to simplify the information on the eating quality of Australian red meat.

The Meat Standards Australia (MSA) grading system is a voluntary program promoted by M&LA. The system provides consumers with simplified information on the eating quality of Australian red meat and aims to improve consumer confidence in markets. These standards provide an indication of beef quality to cattle markets, which subsequently influence prices. MSA relies on data from red meat consumers and examines numerous processing systems, ageing periods and management processes to provide an indication of the meat's eating quality. These include:

- The employment of hormonal growth promotants (HGPs), which increases the weight gain of cattle. The MSA considers the presence of naturally occurring steroids and artificial promotants.
- Following slaughter, meat is assigned a carcass grade which outlines the carcass’ lean and fat content. This assessment is completed before hanging and influences the MSA grade given to the meat.
- The hanging method utilised impacts the tenderness and subsequent eating quality of meat.
- Meat marbling refers to the intramuscular fat of the meat which creates a marble-like appearance.

All these facets are incorporated to give the red meat a grade under the MSA system. The MSA adheres to international standards and its implementation in Australia is overseen by M&LA. The system has been trialled in numerous other countries and has been shown to have varying degrees of effectiveness in European countries.

== Environmental initiatives ==
The production of meat and livestock is a significant contributor to climate change. In Australia, these industries are collectively the third-largest emitter of greenhouse gases and are responsible for 56% of all methane emissions. M&LA has funded and participated in projects which aim to address the environmental impact of livestock production.

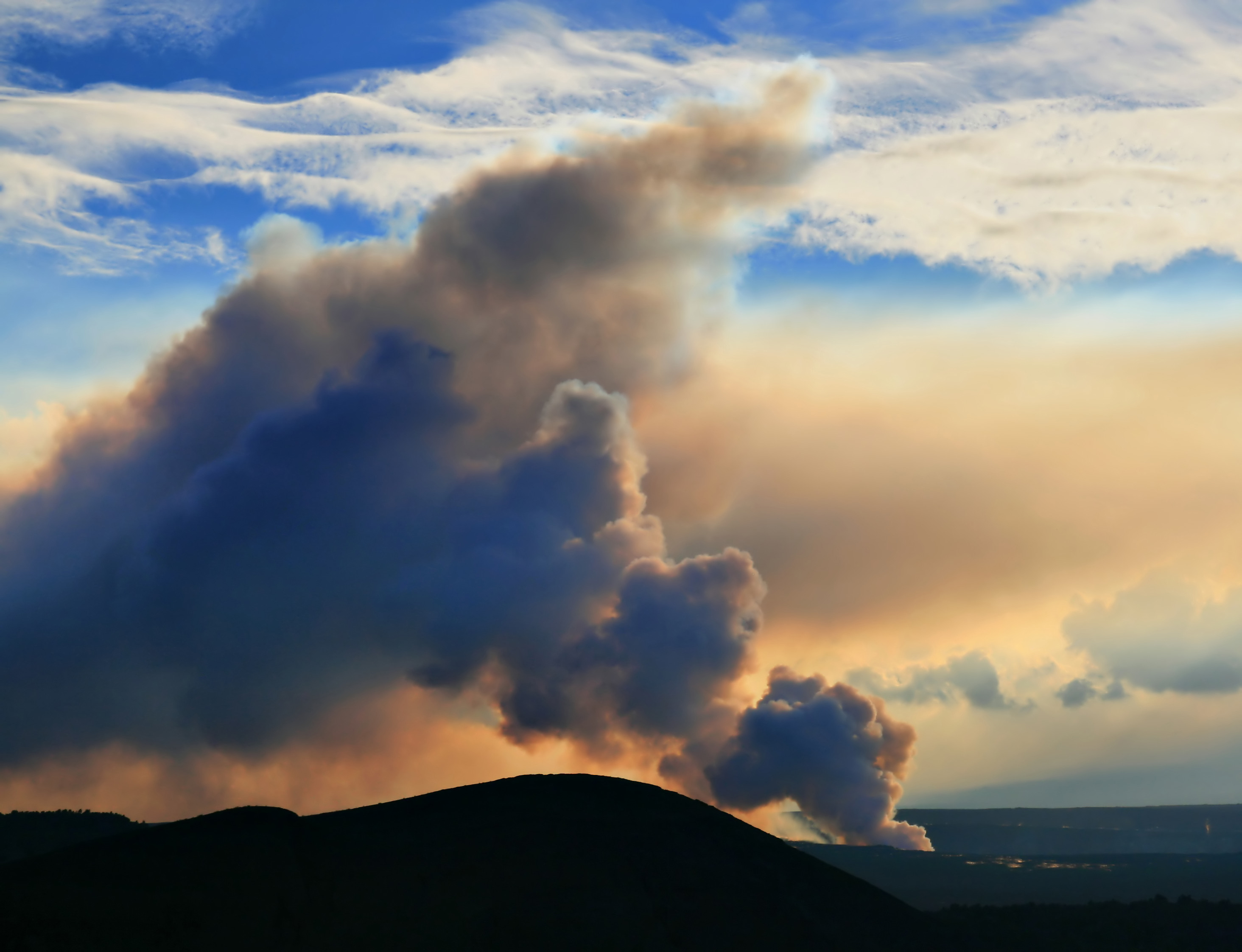
Environmental programs conducted by M&LA aim to reduce the large greenhouse gas emissions made by the Australian meat and livestock industries.

=== National Livestock Methane Program ===
This program was a research and development initiative conducted by M&LA, CSRIO and the Australian Department of Agriculture, Water and the Environment. Commencing in 2012, the four-year program aimed to create environmentally conscious business plans for Australian livestock producers, which allow for the reduction of methane emissions produced by cattle and improve profit margins. Between 2012 and 2015, M&LA provided A$1,350,000 under the National Livestock Methane Program (NLMP). This funding was directed towards research into new technologies and management strategies to reduce methane emissions in livestock production. The implementation of production and management techniques encouraged under NLMP was found to assist in the reduction of beef cattle methane emissions by 24% nationally in 2015.

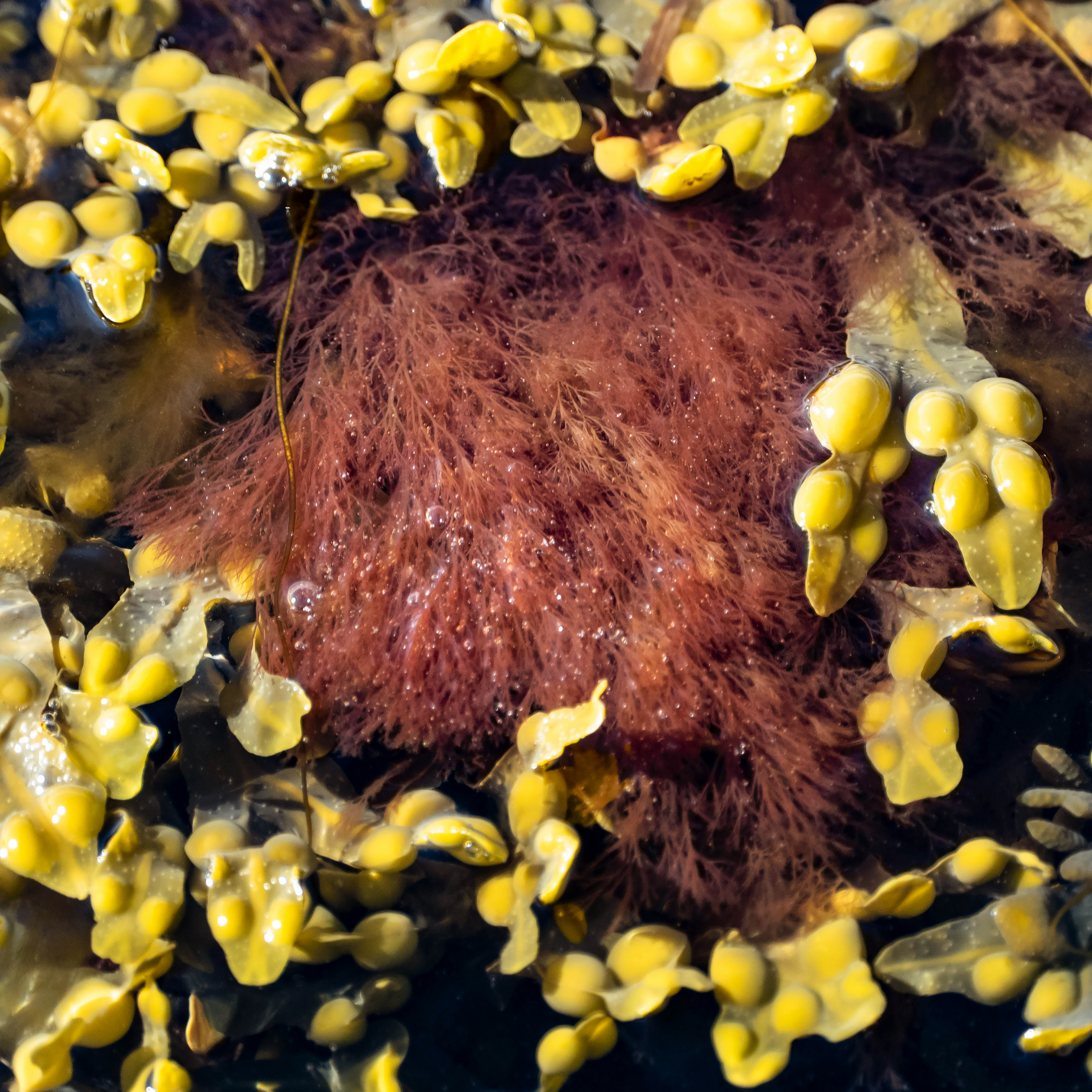
Red algae have been researched by M&LA as a supplement in feed to reduce to cattle methane emissions.

=== Carbon neutral by 2030 ===
M&LA led the 2017 "CN30" goal of the meat and livestock industries, which aims to make both industries carbon-neutral by 2030. M&LA aims to support this goal by funding research into carbon storage systems and formulating environmental management strategies which can be implemented by livestock producers. The "CN30" goal requires that there are no net emissions made in the production and processing of meat, which has been scrutinised for being too ambitious due to the magnitude of emissions the industries are responsible for. Detailed and consistent policy, alongside strong incentives for producers, is considered vital on behalf of M&LA to achieve carbon neutrality within this restricted time period.

Under this initiative, M&LA has researched the use of numerous macroalgae species in feed for beef cattle. The findings from the study orchestrated in conjunction with CSIRO and James Cook University promoted the inclusion of Asparagopsis, which is a species of red algae, as a supplement in cattle feed. Asparagopsis was found to be the most effective red algae in the study at reducing the methane emitted by cattle, reducing emissions by 80% when Asparagopsis accounted for 3% of the cattle's feed.

== Performance ==
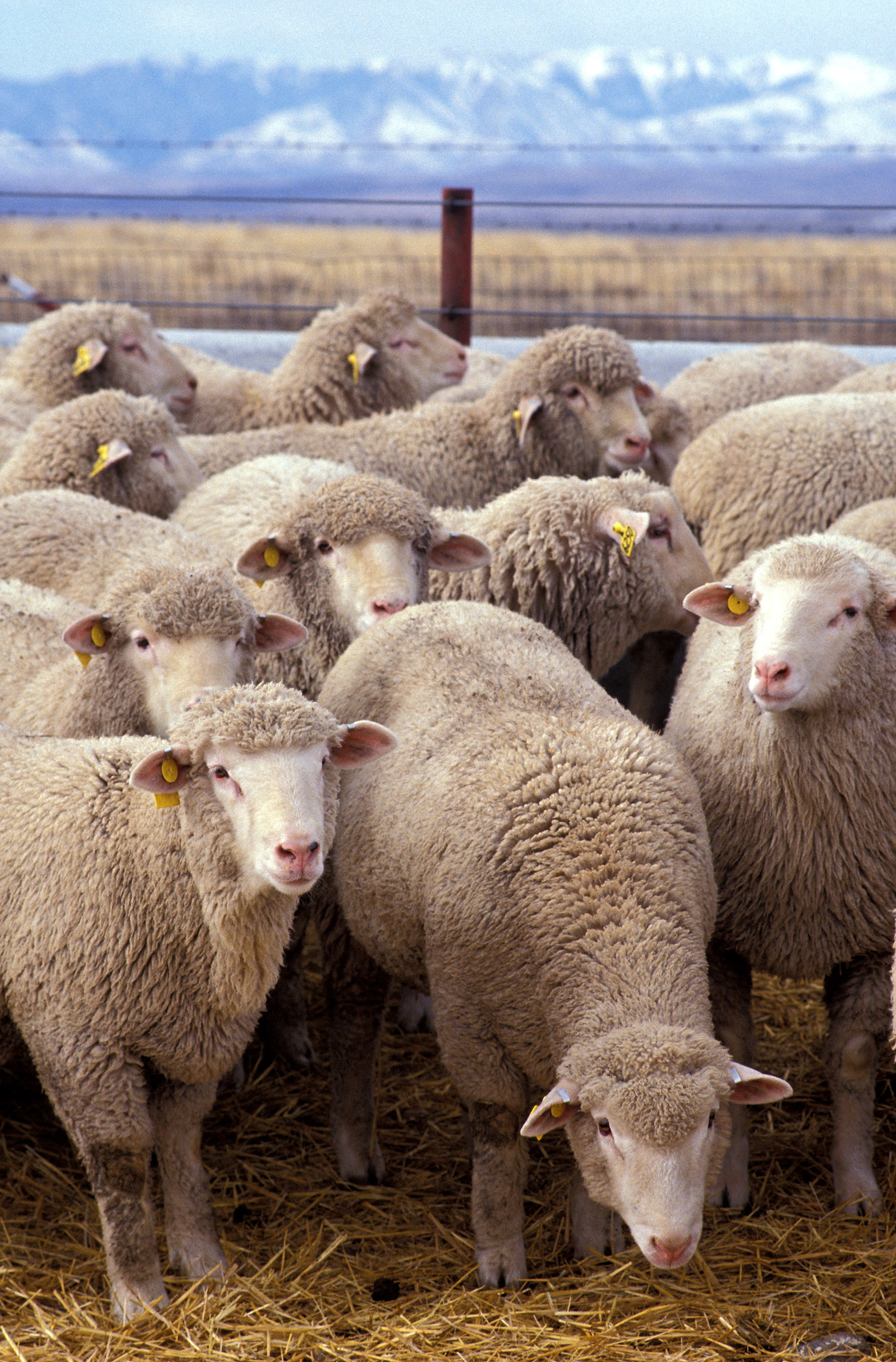
M&LA is required to undergo regular independent review.

As MDC receives funding from the Australian federal government, the performance of the M&LA corporate group is regularly monitored through mandated independent reviews. The Australian Federal government has imposed reviewing regulations which aim to improve the transparency of M&LA as an authority. These measures also strive to promote efficiency in the execution of its initiatives and programs.

In 2020, ACIL Allen released an independent review which analysed the functions and activities of M&LA. The review analysed the performance and efficiency of M&LA and the company's subsidiaries between 2016 and 2020. ACIL Allen Consulting administered this review as required by the statutory funding agreement between M&LA and the Australian government. Established in 2016, this agreement requires M&LA to adhere to these transparency requirements prescribed by the federal government in order to receive government funding. (Note: The statutory agreement between M&LA and the Federal government allows the federal government to oversee M&LA performance and the efficiency of its functions. Under this agreement, M&LA is required to execute independent performance reviews and meet numerous requirements regarding cost allocation and evaluation frameworks. If M&LA fails to do so, the MDC no longer holds an 'approved donor' status and will not be eligible for matched research and development funding by the Commonwealth government. This agreement was renewed in 2020 and has been extended to apply until 2030.)

=== ACIL Allen review ===
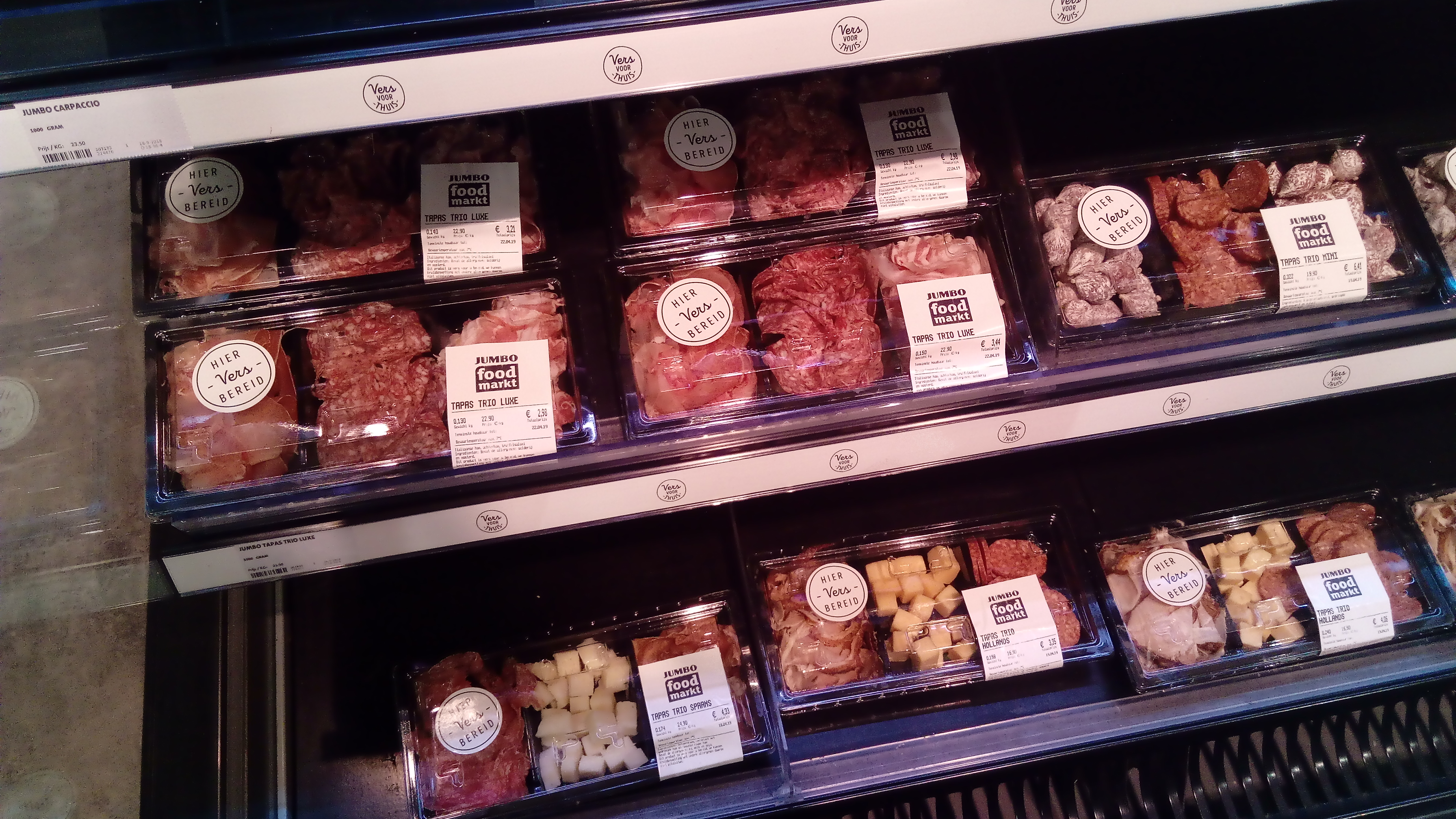
The report conducted by ACIL Allen Consulting provided recommendations for M&LA to implement.

The independent review conducted by ACIL Allen inquired into the efficiency, operations and overall performance of M&LA as an institution in the Australian red meat industry over the past five years. (Note: ACIL Allen Consulting is an independent Australian consulting firm, which specializes in providing economic evaluation and financial advice to public authorities and companies alike.) The role and performance of the subsidiary companies within the M&LA group were also reviewed. The review outlined some functions and practices exercised by M&LA which require improvement and proposed recommendations to enhance the performance of the authority. ACIL Allen Consulting concluded that M&LA was a large and complex authority, with numerous roles at all stages in the meat and livestock supply chains. The report indicates that M&LA has improved correspondence with shareholders and provided enhanced assistance to the Federal Government in the negotiation of trade agreements within the review period. The failure of M&LA to engage in major research and development projects that would provide a greater return to the meat and livestock industries at large was also raised in the report. The corporate group was encouraged to become less financially conservative and fund projects that did carry more financial risk than small-scale initiatives, however has the potential to provide significant economic benefits for the industry. Five overarching recommendations are offered in the review, (Note: The recommendations proposed by ACIL Allen Consulting included self-assessment measures and encouraged stronger funding commitments in select projects M&LA is involved in. To improve the function of ISC and its execution of the NLIS, ACIL Allen advised M&LA to formulate a clear objective and ensure adequate funding for the subsidiary. M&LA was also encouraged to enforce a comprehensive self-assessment framework for its numerous projects and initiatives, to promote efficiency and transparency.) regarding the function of the subsidiaries in the M&LA corporate group. These included establishing a long-term policy direction, ensuring adequate funding for ISC and improving the transparency of MDC. The findings of this report are projected to be considered by the Australian government in the 2020 renewal of the statutory funding agreement it holds with M&LA.

== Marketing controversies ==
The marketing services offered by M&LA aim to increase awareness of the benefits of red meat and encourage more domestic consumption. However, numerous marketing campaigns conducted by M&LA have also been condemned over claims of cultural insensitivity, and satirisation of veganism and vegetarianism. The 'You Never Lamb Alone' advertisement series is produced by M&LA as a part of its 'We Love Our Lamb' marketing campaign. The initiative aims to promote lamb consumption by the Australian population in a comedic manner; however, this approach has attracted criticism in regards to the representation of Australia's cultural identity.

=== 2016 campaigns ===
A 2016 M&LA advertisement received complaints from the Australian public for allegedly promoting violence against vegans.

'Operation Boomerang' was a 2016 advertising initiative conducted by M&LA under the 'We Love Our Lamb' campaign, to promote red meat consumption on Australia Day. It contained a scene depicting a member of a SWAT team breaking into the homes of vegans and employing a flamethrower to burn their food. The advertisement accumulated over 600 complaints from the Australian public to the Advertising Standards Bureau (ASB) for an alleged breach of the Australian Association of National Advertisers' (AANA) Code of Ethics. (Note: Sections 2.1 and 2.3 were alleged to have been breached by M&LA. Section 2.1 prohibits vilification or discrimination of a person or social group on the basis of religion, race or ethnicity. Section 2.3 disallows the presentation of violence that is not justifiable by the product being advertised.) The complaints claimed M&LA improperly used the term 'boomerang' due to its indigenous connotations and that the advertisement also promoted violence against vegans. The ASB board held that the use of 'boomerang' by M&LA was not culturally insensitive towards Aboriginal Australians, referencing the colloquial definition of the word in the Macquarie Dictionary which encompasses the return of a person or object. The ASB board also ruled in favour of M&LA in regards to the discrimination of vegans, stating that:

"[the] torching of the vegan food is an exaggerated and humorous response to the food that is not lamb – a portrayal of the food being less preferable to the advertised product, and not inciting hatred towards people who are vegan."

ASB effectively dismissed all claims of a breach of the AANA Code of Ethics and M&LA was permitted to continue using this advertisement.

In 2016 M&LA also released a campaign as a part of the 'You Never Lamb Alone' series, which strived to encourage inclusivity and multiculturalism within Australia. The advertisement depicts Indigenous Australians welcoming the First Fleet and other migrants to Australia, for a beachside event featuring numerous icons from various cultures, including German beer and Chinese Fireworks. Despite the controversy surrounding the 'You Never Lamb Alone' initiative, M&LA won the Communication Award and the People's Choice award at the 2016 Australian Multicultural Marketing Awards, for this campaign.

=== 2017 campaigns ===
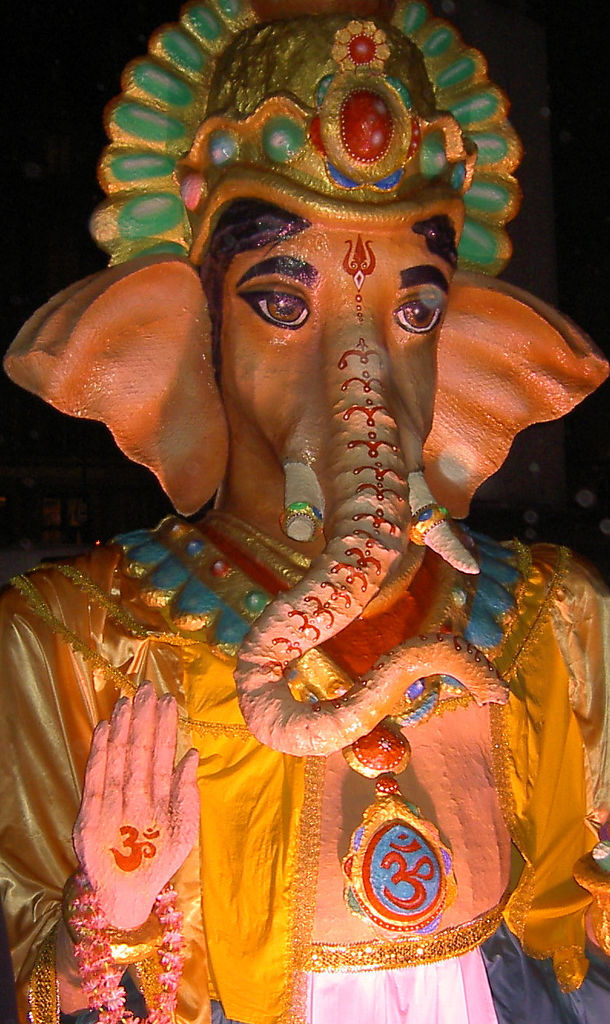

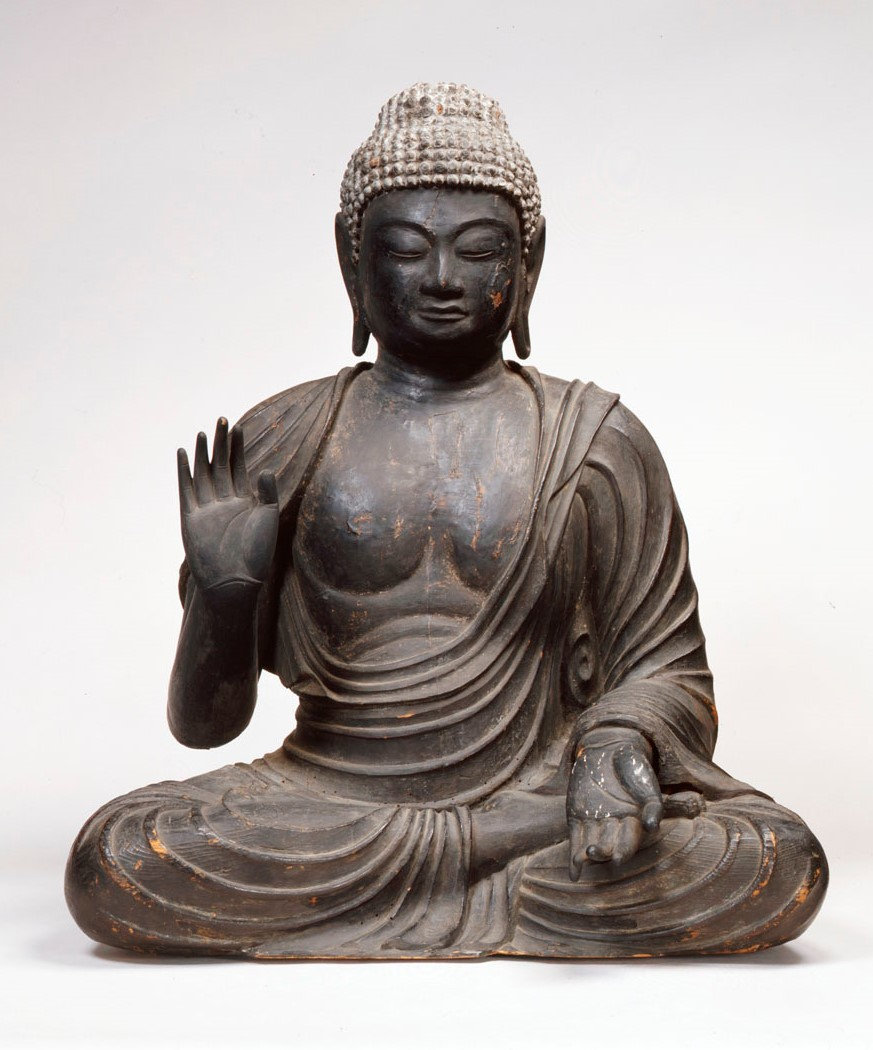
A 2017 campaign featuring Ganesha and Gautama Buddha consuming meat attracted controversy among Hindus and Buddhists

The 2017 'You Never Lamb Alone' campaign released by M&LA was criticised for allegedly inappropriate depictions of religious figures. The advertisement contained Hindu god Ganesha and Buddhist figure Gautama Buddha consuming red meat despite the vegetarian nature of both figures. The Universal Society of Hinduism sought to have the advertisement banned by the ASB, due to the use of Ganesha for commercial purposes. The society's president, Rajan Zed, commented on the request of removal sent to the ASB:

"Lord Ganesha is highly revered in Hinduism...[and is] not to be used in selling lamb meat for mercantile greed. Moreover, linking Lord Ganesha with meat is very disrespectful and highly inappropriate"

A review of this campaign was also conducted by the ASB board, in response to criticism by the Universal Society of Hinduism and the additional 200 complaints received from the Australian public. The ASB initially determined that M&LA was not in breach of the AANA Code of Ethics, citing the campaign's humorous intention to promote religious inclusivity and multiculturalism. However, review of this decision found M&LA to be in breach of Section 2.1 of the Code of Ethics. M&LA was ordered to remove the advertisement from all its social media platforms.

== COVID-19 impact ==
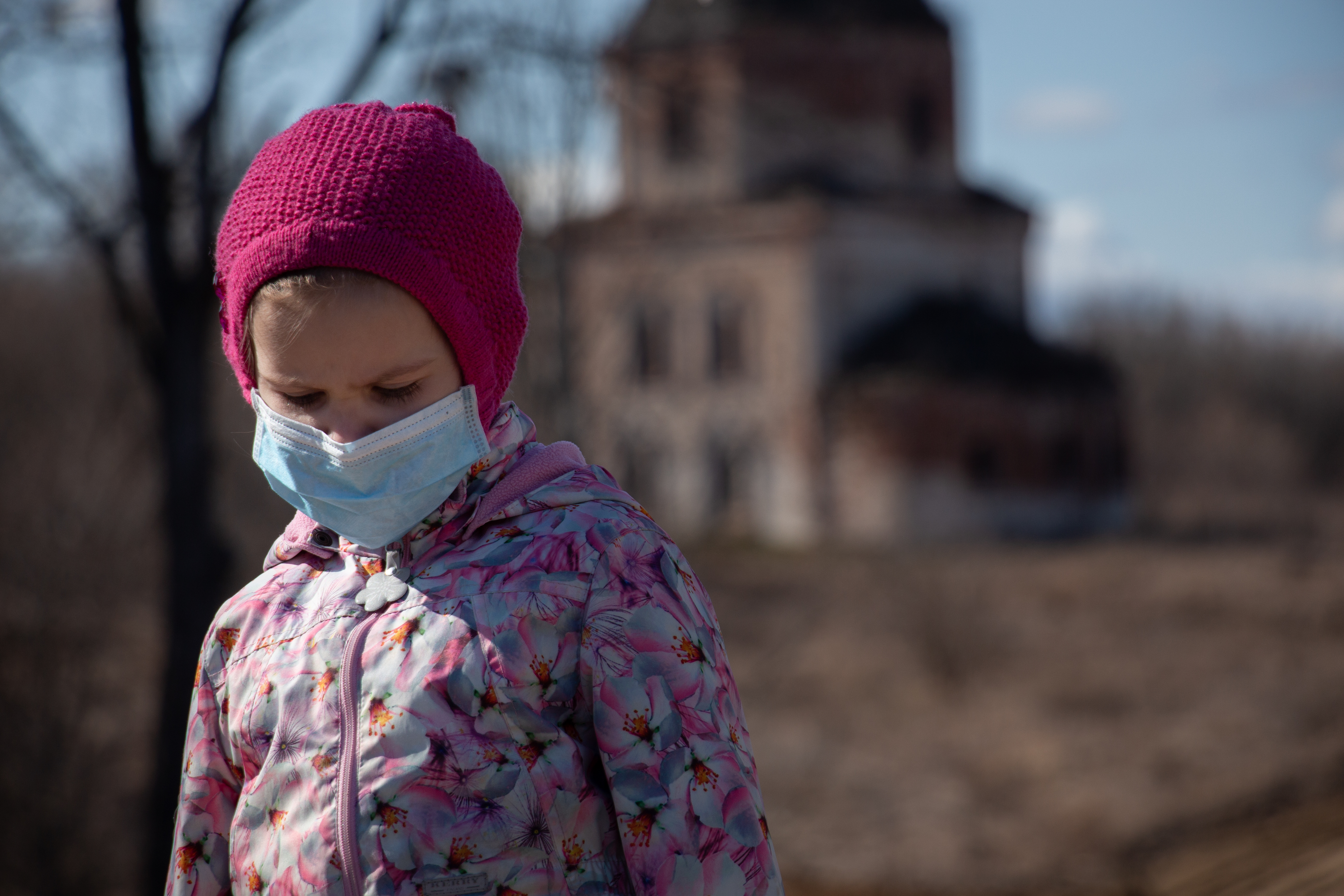
The COVID-19 pandemic has prompted M&LA to implement different marketing techniques, educational programs and research strategies.

The COVID-19 outbreak has disrupted many of the initiatives managed by M&LA, which have consequently been cancelled or indefinitely postponed. M&LA has introduced online educational programs and social forums, which aim to educate the Australia population. Research and data analysis conducted by M&LA has also been interrupted by the pandemic; however, analysis of global markets has been undertaken by M&LA to provide information on conditions in the meat and livestock industries. M&LA aims to directly support producers through the COVID-19 pandemic by providing accessible resources regarding COVID-19 restrictions and mental health support. In 2020, the annual "Red Meat" event which is hosted by M&LA was cancelled due to COVID-19. Jason Strong, the managing director of M&LA, commented on the cancellation: "large events such as Red Meat are just not feasible in the current environment and so the only sensible course of action was to cancel for 2020."

Despite this cancellation, the M&LA Annual General Meeting (AGM) for 2020 was projected to be held online.

In 2021, MLA launched a provocative advertising campaign, created by The Monkeys, part of Accenture Song, making reference to the COVID-19 effect on Australian border restrictions, titled Make Lamb, Not Walls. The campaign took on a satirical approach, referencing politicians such as Scott Morrison, Daniel Andrews and Gladys Berejiklian. The campaign was reported on by major national and international news sources such as The New York Times and The Sydney Morning Herald. It increased sales by 16.8%.

=== Educational initiatives ===
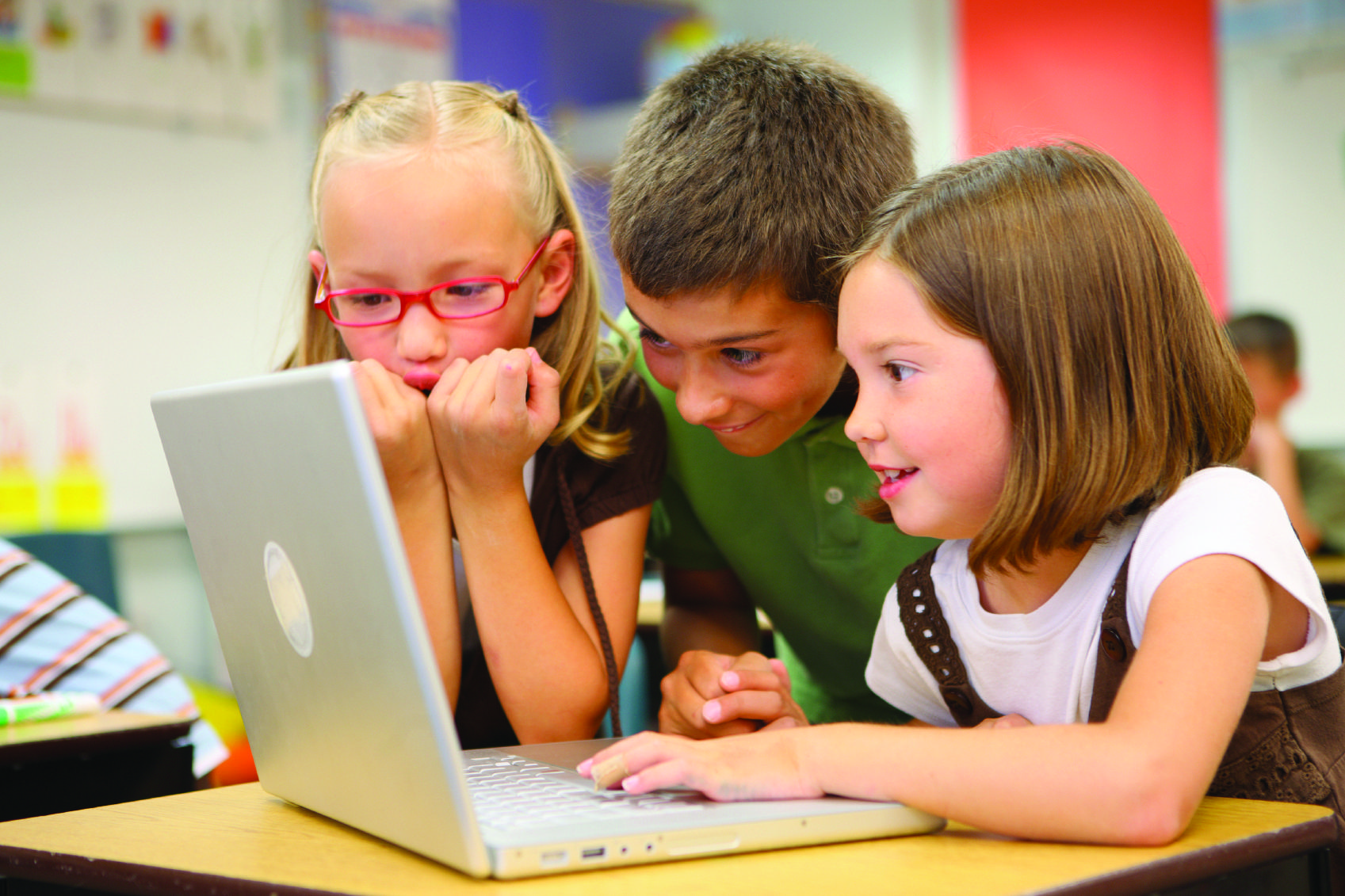
Educational initiatives conducted by M&LA have been modified to accommodate for COVID-19 restrictions.

In response to the COVID-19 outbreak, M&LA has developed online schemes to educate the Australian public on the importance of red meat consumption. M&LA introduced three interactive initiatives for Australian primary schools during the pandemic, 'Your Expert Classroom', 'Be Your Greatest Virtual Classroom' and 'Get Kids Cooking'. These schemes are free to access and consist of educational videos and interactive cooking classes for students and teachers alike.

'Your Expert Classroom' consists of a video series which aim to educate students on the environmental impact of red meat production. Under the 'Be Your Greatest Virtual Classroom' program, M&LA has established partnerships with the Australian Paralympic and Olympic teams, that will compete in the 2021 Tokyo Olympic Games. Students have the opportunity to interact with Australian athletes during a live-streamed question time and discuss the potential benefits of incorporating red meat into their diets.

M&LA strives to encourage the incorporation of red meat in the diets of Australian students through the 'Get Kids Cooking' program. An interactive cooking lesson at an Australian Royal Show is offered to students, but due to COVID-19 restrictions, M&LA replaced this class with a step-by-step cooking tutorial video which can be followed by students at home.

M&LA targets these programs predominantly at schools in metropolitan areas of Australia, to address the deficient understanding of the red meat industry in urban communities compared to rural suburbs.

=== Market analysis ===
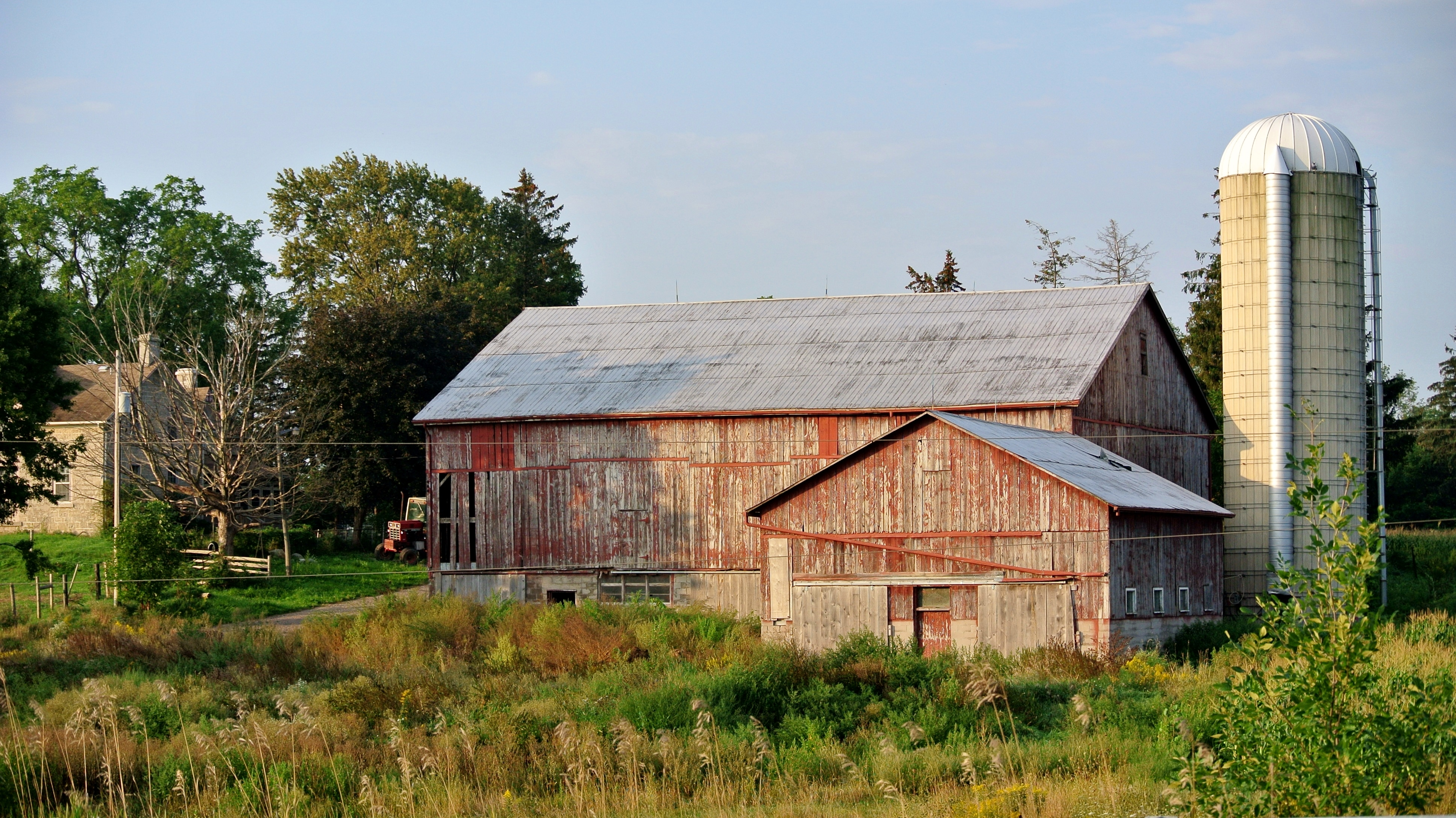
M&LA aims to support producers and consumers alike during the COVID-19 pandemic.

The COVID-19 outbreak has made collecting data and statistics from local and global markets more difficult. Due to COVID-19 restrictions and reduced access to data, M&LA temporarily ceased production of the EYCI between March and June 2020. Following the easing of COVID-19 restrictions throughout Australia, the market indicator returned in the last week of June 2020. M&LA aims to continue providing producers and market analysts with data on international market conditions by implementing studies in foreign markets, which are of interest to Australian producers in terms of meat export volumes. In 2018–19, Australia exported 72% of all beef and veal production, and China accounted for 24% of Australia's beef exports in 2019. M&LA conducted consumer research in China to analyse consumer behaviour and growth trends during the COVID-19 pandemic. The findings from the study indicated a continued increase in consumer demand for red meat in China, with demand for Australian beef increasing by 43% in Chinese markets during the pandemic. These studies seek to improve producer confidence and provide data for market analysts during the COVID-19 pandemic.
