= Max von Sydow filmography =

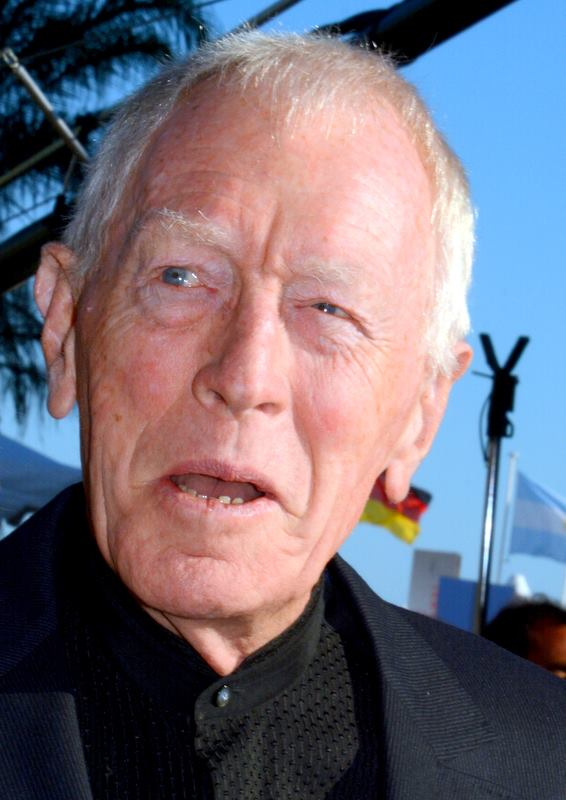
Von Sydow at the 2013 Cannes Film Festival

Max von Sydow (1929–2020) was a Swedish-French actor, active in both European and American cinema.

Von Sydow started his cinematic career in his native country in 1949 and two of his most memorable roles include Knight Antonius Block in The Seventh Seal (1957), the first of his eleven films with director Ingmar Bergman, and the film that includes the iconic scenes in which he plays chess with Death; and as Martin in Through a Glass Darkly (1961).

Beginning in 1965, von Sydow starred in Hollywood films; his debut was as Jesus Christ in The Greatest Story Ever Told (1965). Other roles include as Father Merrin in The Exorcist (1973); Joubert in Three Days of the Condor (1975); Ming the Merciless in Flash Gordon (1980); the villain Ernst Stavro Blofeld in the James Bond film Never Say Never Again (1983); Liet-Kynes in Dune (1984); Dr. Peter Ingham in Awakenings (1990); Lamar Burgess in Minority Report (2002) and Lor San Tekka in Star Wars: The Force Awakens (2015).

Von Sydow was nominated for two Academy Awards, for his roles as Lassefar in Pelle the Conqueror (1987) and The Renter in Extremely Loud & Incredibly Close (2012). On television, von Sydow played Bloodraven in Game of Thrones. In 2011, he voiced Esbern in the video game The Elder Scrolls V: Skyrim.

== Film ==
Year	Title	Role	Director	Notes	Ref(s)
1949	Only a Mother	Nils	Alf Sjöberg		
1951	Miss Julie	Hand	Alf Sjöberg		
1953	No Man's Woman	Olaf	Lars-Eric Kjellgren		
1956	Rätten att älska	Bergman	Mimi Pollak		
1957	The Seventh Seal	Antonius Block	Ingmar Bergman		
1957	The Minister of Uddarbo	Gustaf Ömark	Kenne Fant		
1957	Wild Strawberries	Henrik Åkerman	Ingmar Bergman		
1958	Brink of Life	Harry Andersson	Ingmar Bergman		
1958	Kvinnlig spion 503	Tysk topagent Horst	Jørn Jeppesen		
1958	The Magician	Albert Emanuel Vogler	Ingmar Bergman		
1960	The Virgin Spring	Töre	Ingmar Bergman		
1960	The Wedding Day	Anders Frost	Kenne Fant		
1961	Through a Glass Darkly	Martin	Ingmar Bergman		
1962	Adventures of Nils Holgersson	The Father	Kenne Fant		
1962	The Mistress	Married Man	Vilgot Sjöman		
1963	Winter Light	Jonas Persson	Ingmar Bergman		
1965	4x4	Kvist	Jan Troell		
1965	The Greatest Story Ever Told	Jesus Christ	George Stevens		
1965	The Reward	Scott Swenson	Serge Bourguignon		
1966	Hawaii	Reverend Abner Hale	George Roy Hill		
1966	The Quiller Memorandum	Oktober	Michael Anderson		
1966	Here's Your Life	Smålands-Pelle	Jan Troell		
1968	Hour of the Wolf	Johan Borg	Ingmar Bergman		
1968	Black Palm Trees	Gustav Olofsson	Lars-Magnus Lindgren		
1968	Shame	Jan Rosenberg	Ingmar Bergman		
1969	Made in Sweden	Magnus Rud	Johan Bergenstråhle		
1969	The Passion of Anna	Andreas Winkelman	Ingmar Bergman		
1970	The Kremlin Letter	Colonel Kosnov	John Huston		
1971	The Night Visitor	Salem	László Benedek		
1971	The Emigrants	Karl Oskar	Jan Troell		
1971	The Touch	Andreas Vergerus	Ingmar Bergman		
1971	The Apple War	Roy Lindberg	Tage Danielsson		
1972	Embassy	Gorenko	Gordon Hessler		
1972	The New Land	Karl Oskar	Jan Troell		
1973	The Exorcist	Father Lankester Merrin	William Friedkin		
1974	Steppenwolf	Harry Haller	Fred Haines		
1975	Egg! Egg! A Hardboiled Story	The Father	Hans Alfredson		
1975	Le miroir éclate	Matthew Lawrence	Claude d'Anna		
1975	Three Days of the Condor	G. Joubert	Sydney Pollack		
1975	The Ultimate Warrior	The Baron	Robert Clouse		
1976	Dog's Heart	Professor Filipp Filippovich Preobrazenski	Alberto Lattuada		
1976	Illustrious Corpses	Supreme Court's President	Francesco Rosi		
1976	Foxtrot	Larsen	Arturo Ripstein		
1976	The Desert of the Tartars	Hortiz	Valerio Zurlini		
1976	Voyage of the Damned	Captain Schroeder	Stuart Rosenberg		
1977	Exorcist II: The Heretic	Father Lankester Merrin	John Boorman		
1977	March or Die	François Marneau	Dick Richards		
1977	Black Journal	Lisa Carpi	Mauro Bolognini		
1978	Brass Target	Shelley	John Hough		
1979	Hurricane	Dr Danielsson	Jan Troell		
1979	Bugie bianche	Marcello Herrighe	Stefano Rolla		
1980	Death Watch	Gerald Mortenhoe	Bertrand Tavernier		
1980	Flash Gordon	Ming the Merciless	Mike Hodges		
1981	Escape to Victory	Major Karl von Steiner	John Huston		
1981	She Dances Alone	Himself / Nijinsky	Robert Dornhelm	Voice	
1982	Conan the Barbarian	King Osric	John Milius		
1982	Flight of the Eagle	Salomon August Andrée	Jan Troell		
1982	Hit Man	Colonel O'Donnell	José Antonio de la Loma		
1983	Le Cercle des passions	Carlo di Vilalfratti	Claude d'Anna		
1983	Strange Brew	Brewmeister Smith	Rick Moranis; Dave Thomas		
1983	Never Say Never Again	Ernst Stavro Blofeld	Irvin Kershner		
1984	Dreamscape	Doctor Paul Novotny	Joseph Ruben		
1984	Dune	Doctor Liet-Kynes	David Lynch		
1985	Code Name: Emerald	Jurgen Brausch	Jonathan Sanger		
1985	The Repenter	Spinola	Pasquale Squitieri		
1986	Hannah and Her Sisters	Frederick	Woody Allen		
1986	The Second Victory	Dr Huber	Gerald Thomas		
1986	The Wolf at the Door	August Strindberg	Henning Carlsen		
1986	Duet for One	Dr Louis Feldman	Andrei Konchalovsky		
1987	Pelle the Conqueror	Lassefar Karlsson	Bille August		
1988	Katinka	—N/a	Max von Sydow		
1989	Ghostbusters II	Vigo	Ivan Reitman	Voice	
1990	The Bachelor	Von Schleheim	Roberto Faenza		
1990	A Violent Life	Pope Clement VII	Giacomo Battiato		
1990	Father	Joe Mueller	John Power		
1990	Awakenings	Dr Peter Ingham	Penny Marshall		
1991	A Kiss Before Dying	Thor Carlsson	James Dearden		
1991	Europa	Narrator	Lars von Trier	Voice	
1991	Until the End of the World	Henry Farber	Wim Wenders		
1991	The Ox	Vicar	Sven Nykvist		
1991	The Best Intentions	Johan Åkerblom	Bille August		
1992	The Silent Touch	Henry Kesdi	Krzysztof Zanussi		
1993	Grandpa's Journey	Simon S.L. Fromm	Staffan Lamm		
1993	Needful Things	Leland Gaunt	Fraser C. Heston		
1994	Time is Money	Joe Kaufman	Paolo Barzman		
1995	Judge Dredd	Judge Fargo	Danny Cannon		
1996	Hamsun	Knut Hamsun	Jan Troell		
1996	Jerusalem	Vicar	Bille August		
1997	Hercules	Zeus	Ron Clements; John Musker	Swedish dub	
1997	Hostile Waters	Admiral Chervavin	David Drury		
1998	What Dreams May Come	The Tracker	Vincent Ward		
1999	Snow Falling on Cedars	Nels Gudmundsson	Scott Hicks		
2001	Sleepless	Ulisse Moretti	Dario Argento		
2001	Druids	Guttuart	Jacques Dorfmann		
2001	Intacto	Samuel	Juan Carlos Fresnadillo		
2002	Minority Report	Director Lamar Burgess	Steven Spielberg		
2002	Les amants de Mogador	—N/a	Souheil Ben-Barka		
2004	Night of the Living Dorks	Father Lankester Merrin	Matthias Dinter	Uncredited, Cameo	
2005	Heidi	Uncle Alp	Paul Marcus		
2006	The Inquiry	Tiberius	Giulio Base		
2007	Rush Hour 3	Varden Reynard	Brett Ratner		
2007	Emotional Arithmetic	Jakob Bronski	Paolo Barzman		
2007	The Diving Bell and the Butterfly	Papinou	Julian Schnabel		
2009	Solomon Kane	Josiah Kane	Michael J. Bassett		
2009	A Man and His Dog	The Commander	Francis Huster	Cameo	
2010	Shutter Island	Dr Jeremiah Naehring	Martin Scorsese		
2010	Robin Hood	Sir Walter Loxley	Ridley Scott		
2010	Moomins and the Comet Chase	Narrator	Maria Lindberg	Voice	
2010	The Wolfman	Passenger on train	Joe Johnston	Uncredited, Director's cut	
2011	Extremely Loud & Incredibly Close	The Renter	Stephen Daldry		
2012	Truth & Treason	Frank Fikeis			
2012	Branded	Joseph Pascal	Jamie Bradshaw & Aleksandr Dulerayn		
2013	Dragons 3D	Dr Alistair Conis	Marc Fafard		
2015	The Letters	Father Celeste van Exem	William Riead		
2015	Star Wars: The Force Awakens	Lor San Tekka	J. J. Abrams		
2016	The First, the Last	The Undertaker	Bouli Lanners		
2018	Kursk	Vladimir Petrenko	Thomas Vinterberg		
2021	Echoes of the Past (Greek Title: Kalavryta 1943)	Nikolas Andreou (aged)	Nicholas Dimitropoulos	Posthumous release	

== Television ==
Year	Title	Role	Notes	Ref(s)
1957	Herr Sleeman kommer	The Hunter	Television film	
1958	Rabies	Bo Stensson Svenningson	TV movie	
1967	The Diary of Anne Frank	Otto Frank	Television film	
1973	Kvartetten som sprängdes	Engineer Planertz	4 episodes	
1984	Samson and Delilah	Sidka	Television film	
1984	The Soldier's Tale	The Devil	Voice, Television film	
1984	Le Dernier Civil	Johann Kaspar Bäuerle	Television film	
1985	Kojak: The Belarus File	Peter Barak	Television film	
1985	The Last Place on Earth	Fridtjof Nansen	3 episodes	
1985	Quo Vadis?	The Apostle Peter	6 episodes	
1985	Christopher Columbus	King John of Portugal	4 episodes	
1986	Gösta Berlings saga	Melchior Sinclaire	3 episodes	
1989	Red King, White Knight	Szaz		
1990	Hiroshima: Out of the Ashes	Father Siemes	Television film	
1993	Och ge oss skuggorna	Eugene O'Neill	Television film	
1993	The Young Indiana Jones Chronicles	Sigmund Freud	Episode: "Vienna, November 1908"	
1994	A che punto è la notte	Archbishop of Turin	Television film	
1994	Radetzkymarsch	Baron Franz von Trotta und Sipolje	2 episodes	
1994	Uncle Vanya	Professor Serebryakov	Television film	
1995	Citizen X	Dr Alexandr Bukhanovsky		
1996	Samson and Delilah	Narrator	Voice, Uncredited; Television film	
1996	Private Confessions	Jacob	Television film	
1997	Hostile Waters	Admiral Chernavin	Television film	
1997	La principessa e il povero	Epos	Television film	
1997	Solomon	David	3 episodes	
2000	Nuremberg	Samuel Rosenman	Episode #1.1	
2004	Hidden Children – Escape of the Innocents	Valobra	Television film	
2004	Dark Kingdom: The Dragon King	Eyvind	Television film	
2009	The Tudors	Cardinal von Walburg	4 episodes	
2014	The Simpsons	Klaus Ziegler	Voice, Episode: "The War of Art"	
2016	Game of Thrones	Bloodraven	3 episodes	

== Video games ==
Year	Title	Voice role	Ref(s)
2009	Ghostbusters: The Video Game	Vigo the Carpathian	
2011	The Elder Scrolls V: Skyrim	Esbern	
2016	Lego Star Wars: The Force Awakens	Lor San Tekka	
