= Ved Vejen =

Book by Herman Bang

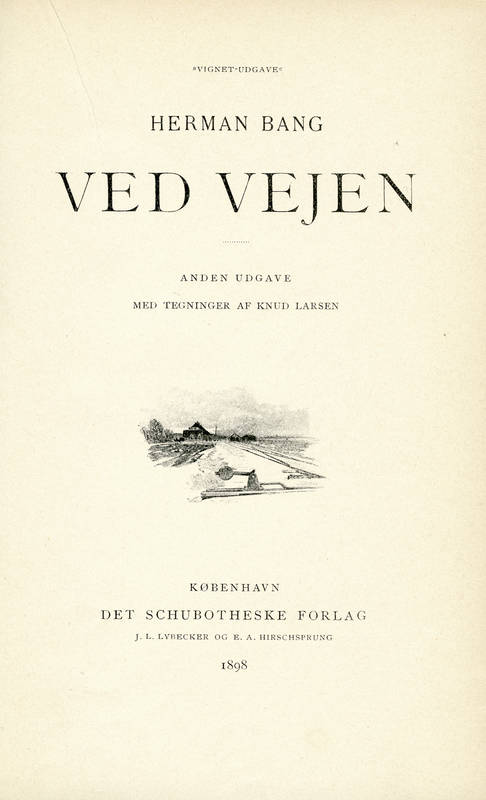
- Author: Herman Bang
- Language: Danish
- Publisher: Det Schubotheske Forlag
- Publication date: 1886
- Publication place: Denmark
- Media type: Print

Ved Vejen (meaning By the Wayside or At the Roadside) is a short novel written by the Danish author Herman Bang in 1886. It was originally published in Copenhagen by Det Schubotheske Forlag as part of a collection of four stories entitled Stille Eksistenser (Quiet Existences), centering on women who are subdued or living in isolation. It was first published independently in 1898. An impressionist novel, it relates the story of Katinka, a sensitive but ambitious young woman married to a boisterous and somewhat vulgar station master, Bai.

At the time of release in Denmark in 1886, critics from the daily newspapers were generally enthusiastic about Ved Vejen. It is now considered an important contribution to Danish literature, listed in the Danish Culture Canon. In 1988 it was made into a feature film Katinka, directed by Max von Sydow.

== Background ==
Herman Bang's novel was inspired by an incident in 1883 when he was passing through Skørping Station in the north of Jutland. He noticed a young woman at the window who, her pale face couched in her hands, stared after his departing train. In the introduction to Stille Eksistenser he explains: "For the rest of the journey, I could see the woman's face between the flowers. Her look was not quite one of longing — longing would have perhaps fluttered to death by breaking its wings in such tight confines — just a quiet resignation, a waning sorrow. And when the train had slid by, she would be peering out with the same look over the monotonous heather plain."

Bang started writing the novel in 1885 in Vienna, after remembering Skørping Station: "It was in one of those windows behind the flowers that I saw her face, a face which I had not been able to erase from my memory for two years and which, as if a painter, I felt like drawing in soft, melancholic, almost blurry lines and using it as a kind of cover illustration for this book."

== Plot ==
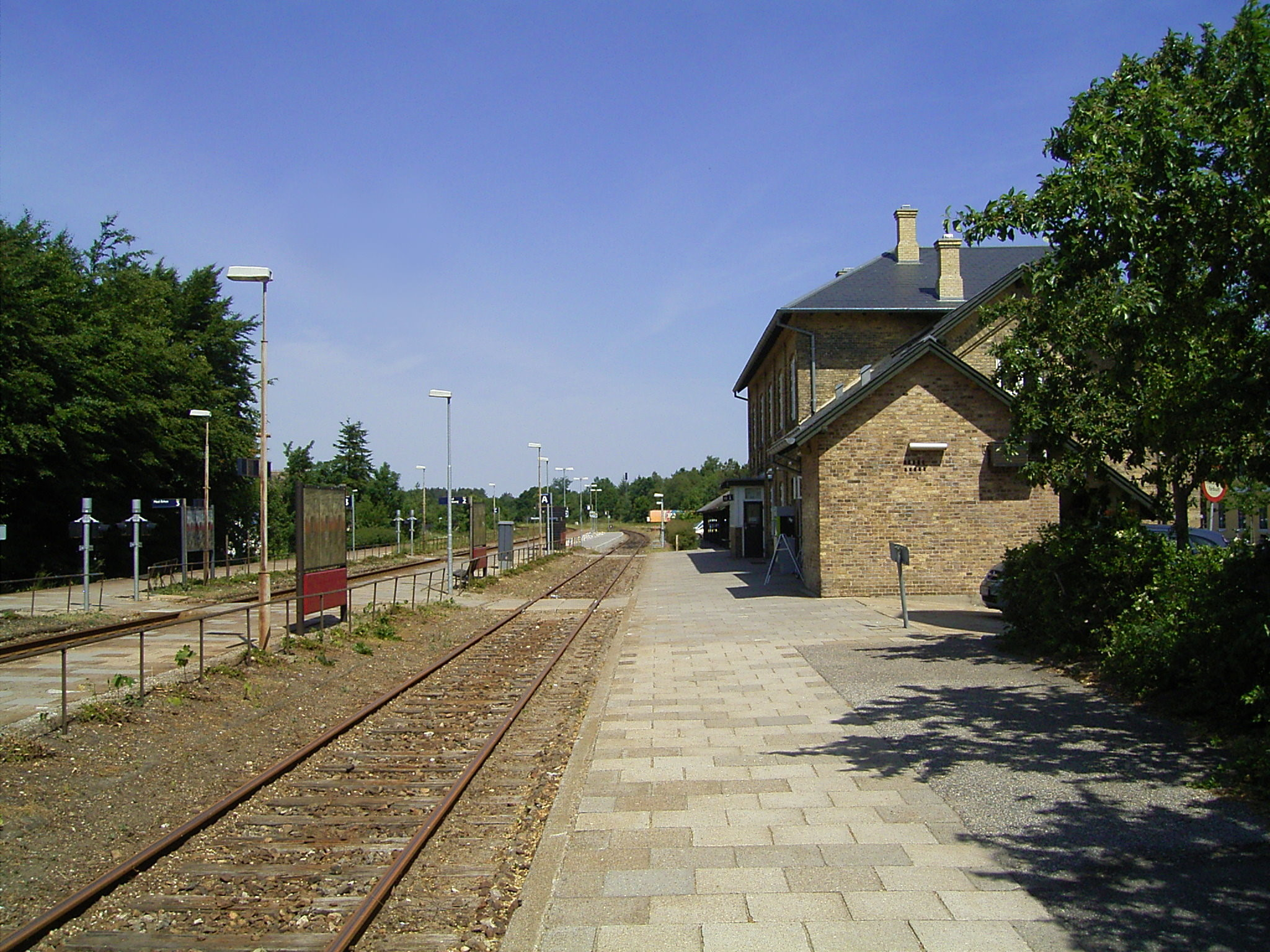
A memory of Skørping Station led to Ved Vejen

The novel centres on the character of Katinka Bai, a quiet, sensitive young woman married to a boisterous and somewhat vulgar station master, Bai. The marriage is barren, and she remains isolated. Almost subconsciously, she passionately longs after something undefinable. Even after the arrival of Huus, a neighbour with whom she begins to establish a promising relationship, she is unable to fulfill her passion, although for the first time in her life she falls in love. In the small provincial community where they live, neither she nor Huus dares to break the conventions they know, sad as it all may be. When they realize they cannot take their attachment any further, they decide to separate, and Huus leaves the country. Not long after, Katinka’s health begins to gradually deteriorate, and she develops a terrible cough. The following autumn, people gather at her funeral.

== Themes ==
In Ved Vejen, Bang has masterfully developed his impressionistic style. While recognizing that impressionism was first and foremost a trend in painting, he explained in a letter sent to Peter Nansen from Prague that he was trying to achieve the same style in literature: "Impressionistic is indeed the word. I am frantically striving to make every single impression clear and precise and distinctive, and so I never think about the whole" Jean-Claude Polet adds that while he owes much to Zola, Daudet and Maupassant, he channels naturalism into a quite unexpected direction, that of impressionism. His characters are revealed through their responses or a slight turn of phrase along the lines of the Norwegian Jonas Lie or the Russian Turgenev. He does not explain, he merely presents a picture, providing the reader with impressions, allowing him to read between the lines, interpreting what lies behind the words. On meeting Claude Monet, he was told, "You are the first impressionist writer." A recognized example of his mastery of impressionism is the novel's opening scene where all the characters meet at the station.

Depiction of Katinka Bai

Longtime Scandinavian Studies scholar Niels Ingwersen states that the novel "engagingly, ironically, sadly captures the quite trivial life of a rural, provincial community" and illustrates an unconsummated love relationship between two ordinary people. He highlights the "amazingly suggestive impressionism" of the novel which permits the reader to become more intimate with the characters, especially the scene at the vicar's party which provides a vivid image of the personalities of the people attending it, with their individual voices coming together to form a complete picture. Although Katinka Bai, a timid individual, is not a heroine in comparison with today's depiction of a strong independent woman, the reader is naturally drawn to empathize with her situation and with her as a character.

== Critical response ==
The novel, like Bang's other works such as Stuk (1887), Tine (1889), and Ludvigsbakke (1896), is still widely read in Denmark, confirming the author as one of Denmark's leading novelists. At the time of release in Denmark in 1886, the daily newspapers were generally enthusiastic about Ved Vejen. Writing in Politiken, Edvard Brandes, after referring to the novel's "outrageous style", welcomed it as a "quite excellent novel" which was "so specially Danish". He concluded by calling for it to be widely read as "the best new literature we have seen this autumn". In Social-Demokraten, C.E. Jensen found that Bang "depicts the infinitely simple existence and everything it covers with the finest and most sensitive art... His style gives the reader an impression of reality's monotony, allowing him to imagine the emotions hidden behind it." Vilhelm Møller of Nutiden i Billeder og Text praised Ved Vejen as the best of the four stories in Stille Eksistenser, "containing all Bang's qualities in good measure and very few of the weaknesses which have disrupted his earlier work. It can certainly be favourably compared with all the novels of the past year." Only Berlingske Tidende's (unnamed) critic was dismissive, commenting: "The story Ved Vejen is weak in content and often unreadable in form... We recommend the author to be less nervous, less jumpy and less impressionistic."

In selecting Ved Vejen for the Danish Culture Canon, the selection committee operating under the Danish Ministry of Culture explained that the attraction of the novel is that it portrays with considerable empathy how a meek young woman becomes increasingly aware of desires she hardly knew she possessed. With bittersweet irony, the author allows Katinka to develop her infatuation by listening to the heartaches of others. With its almost cinematic sequences, the novel conveys a balance between its subdued humour and a strong sympathy for what goes on in people's minds, especially in a secluded environment removed from mainstream society. It is not just Bang's portrayal of a bygone provincial world that seems so typically Danish but his mastery in making the hidden pain of loneliness so meaningful to today's readership. In 1988 it was made into a feature film Katinka, directed by Max von Sydow, starring Tammi Øst as Katinka.

== Literature ==
Ved Vejen has been translated into English as Katinka.

- Bang, Herman (1990) [1886]. Katinka. Translated by Tiina Nunnally. Fjord Press. ISBN 978-0-940242-47-0.
- Herman Bang (1922): Værker i Mindeudgave, Gyldendal (Original Danish text at kb.dk; Ved Vejen pages 9-164)
