= List of awards and nominations received by Max von Sydow =

Max Von Sydow awards and nominations
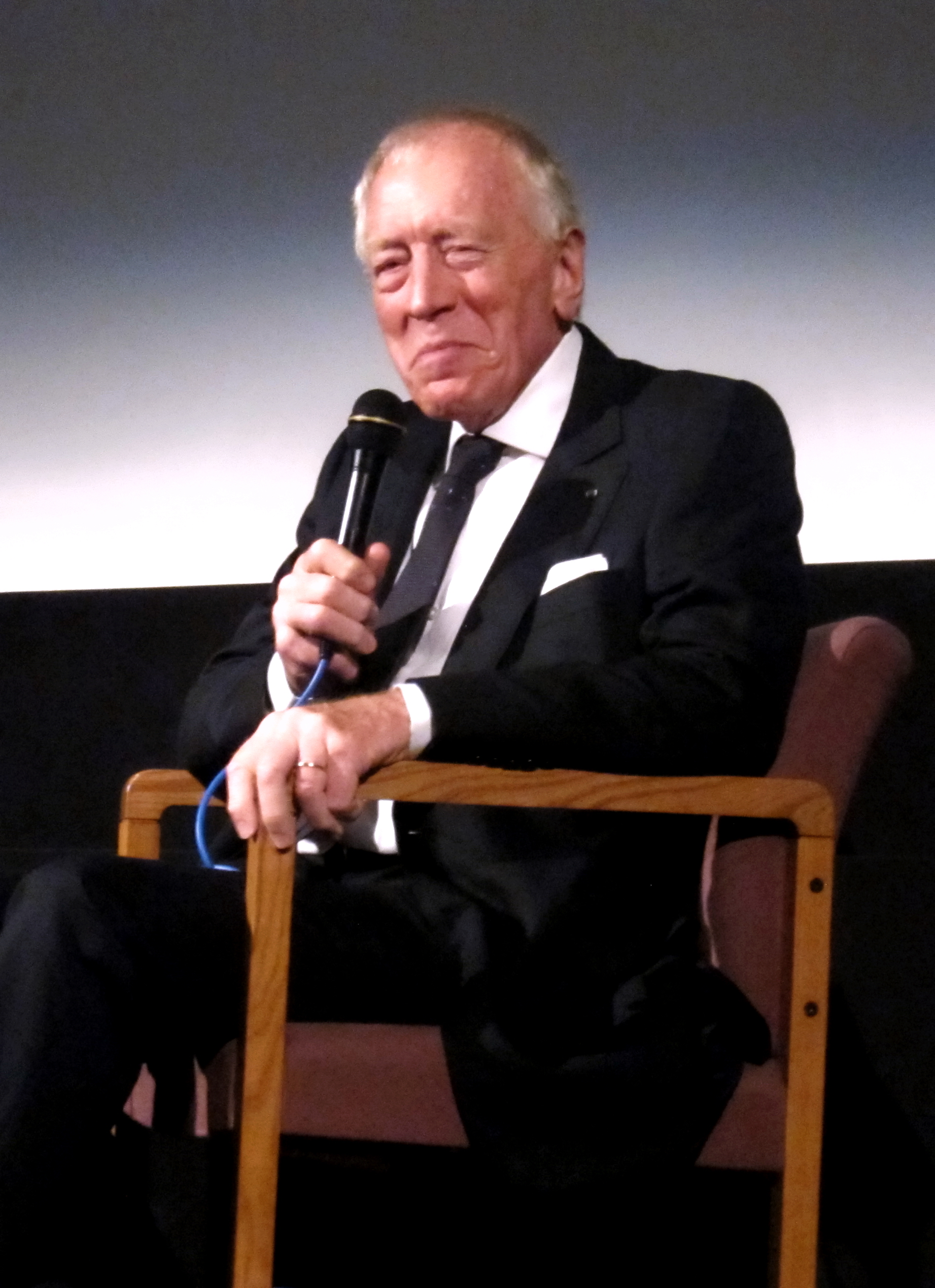
- Max von Sydow in 2012
Awards and nominations
Award	Wins	Nominations
Academy Awards	0	2
Guldbagge Award	3	3
Golden Globe Awards	0	2
Primetime Emmy Award	0	2

Totals (Note: Certain award groups do not simply award one winner. They acknowledge several different recipients, have runners-up, and have third place. Since this is a specific recognition and is different from losing an award, runner-up mentions are considered wins in this award tally. For simplification and to avoid errors, each award in this list has been presumed to have had a prior nomination.)
- Wins: 22
- Nominations: 42

Max von Sydow was a Swedish-French actor who starred in numerous of Ingmar Bergman's films as well as many American films in his 70 year career. He appeared in eleven of Bergman's films including The Seventh Seal (1957), Wild Strawberries (1957), The Magician (1958), The Virgin Spring (1960), Through a Glass Darkly (1961), Winter Light (1963), Shame (1968), The Passion of Anna (1969) and The Touch (1971).

Sydow was able to transfer to American films starring as Jesus Christ in George Stevens' biblical epic film The Greatest Story Ever Told (1965). He later would go on to star in films such as William Friedkin's The Exorcist (1973), David Lynch's Dune (1984), Woody Allen's Hannah and Her Sisters (1986), Penny Marshall's Awakenings (1990), Steven Spielberg's Minority Report (2002), Julian Schnabel's The Diving Bell and the Butterfly (2007), Martin Scorsese's Shutter Island (2010), Ridley Scott's Robin Hood (2010), and J. J. Abrams' Star Wars: The Force Awakens (2015). He also had a supporting role in HBO's Game of Thrones as the Three-eyed Raven, for which he received a Primetime Emmy Award nomination.

He has been nominated for two Academy Awards for his performances in Bille August's Pelle the Conqueror (1987) and Stephen Daldry's Extremely Loud & Incredibly Close (2011). At the age of 82, von Sydow was one of the oldest nominees for an Academy Award. Sydow also received two Golden Globe Awards nominations as well as two Primetime Emmy Awards nominations. In 1982 he received the Best Actor prize at the Venice International Film Festival for his performance in Flight of the Eagle. He is also the winner of 3 Guldbagge Awards and received a festival trophy from the Cannes Film Festival in 2004. He received the Royal Foundation of Sweden's Cultural Award in 1954, was made a Commandeur des Arts et des Lettres in 2005, and was named a Chevalier de la Légion d'honneur on 17 October 2012.

== Major Awards ==
=== Academy Award ===
Year	Category	Nominated work	Result	Ref.
1989	Best Actor	Pelle the Conqueror	Nominated	
2012	Best Supporting Actor	Extremely Loud & Incredibly Close	Nominated	

At the age of 82, von Sydow was one of the oldest nominees for an Academy Award in the Best Supporting Actor category (for the 2011 film Extremely Loud & Incredibly Close).

=== Golden Globe Award ===
Year	Category	Nominated work	Result	Ref.
1967	Best Actor – Drama	Hawaii	Nominated	
1974	Best Supporting Actor – Motion Picture	The Exorcist	Nominated	

=== Guldbagge Award ===
Year	Category	Nominated work	Result	Ref.
1987	Best Actor	Pelle the Conqueror	Won	
1988	Best Director	Katinka	Won	
1996	Best Actor	Hamsun	Won	

=== Primetime Emmy Award ===
Year	Category	Nominated work	Result	Ref.
1990	Best Supporting Actor – Limited Series or Movie	Red King, White Knight	Nominated	
2016	Best Guest Actor – Drama Series	Game of Thrones	Nominated	

== Film festivals ==
Year	Festival	Category	Nominated work	Result	Ref.
1976	Cartagena Film Festival	Best Actor	Three Days of the Condor	Won	
1982	Venice Film Festival	Best Actor	Flight of the Eagle	Won	
1992	Tokyo International Film Festival	Best Actor	The Silent Touch	Won	
1994	Karlovy Vary International Film Festival	Best Actor	Time is Money	Won	
1996	Valladolid International Film Festival	Best Actor	Hamsun	Won	
2004	Cannes Film Festival	Festival Trophy	—N/a	Won	
2005	Capri Hollywood International Film Festival	Legend Award	—N/a	Won	
2006	San Sebastián International Film Festival	Donostia Award	—N/a	Won	
2008	Tallinn Black Nights Film Festival	Lifetime Achievement Award	—N/a	Won	
2016	Sitges Film Festival	Honorary Grand Prize	—N/a	Won	
2019	Stockholm International Film Festival	Lifetime Achievement Award	—N/a	Won	

== Critics awards ==
Year	Award	Category	Nominated work	Result	Ref.
2011	Boston Society of Film Critics	Best Supporting Actor	Extremely Loud & Incredibly Close	Nominated	
2011	Dallas–Fort Worth Film Critics Association	Best Supporting Actor	Extremely Loud & Incredibly Close	Nominated	
2012	Georgia Film Critics Association	Best Supporting Actor	Extremely Loud & Incredibly Close	Nominated	
1975	Kansas City Film Critics Circle	Best Supporting Actor	Three Days of the Condor	Won	
2017	Los Angeles Film Critics Association	Career Achievement	—N/a	Won	
1967	National Society of Film Critics	Best Actor	Hawaii	Nominated	
1989	National Society of Film Critics	Best Actor	Pelle the Conqueror	Nominated	
2011	San Diego Film Critics Society	Best Supporting Actor	Extremely Loud & Incredibly Close	Nominated	

== Other awards ==
Year	Award	Category	Nominated work	Result	Ref.
1990	AACTA Award	Best Actor in a Leading Role	Father	Won	
1988	Bodil Award	Best Actor in a Leading Role	Pelle the Conqueror	Won	
1997	Bodil Award	Best Actor in a Leading Role	Hamsun	Won	
1991	CableACE Award	Supporting Actor in a Movie or Miniseries	Red King, White Knight	Nominated	
1995	CableACE Award	Supporting Actor in a Movie or Miniseries	Citizen X	Nominated	
1988	European Film Award	Best Actor	Pelle the Conqueror	Won	
1993	Fangoria Chainsaw Award	Best Actor	Needful Things	Nominated	
1962	Fotogramas de Plata	Best Foreign Performer	The Seventh Seal	Won	
2009	Genie Award	Best Supporting Actor	Emotional Arithmetic	Nominated	
1988	Robert Award	Best Actor in a Leading Role	Pelle the Conqueror	Won	
1981	Saturn Award	Best Supporting Actor	Flash Gordon	Nominated	
1994	Saturn Award	Best Actor	Needful Things	Nominated	
2003	Saturn Award	Best Supporting Actor	Minority Report	Nominated	
2007	Village Voice Film Poll	Best Supporting Actor	The Diving Bell and the Butterfly	8th place	
