= Alice Krige =

South African actress (born 1954)

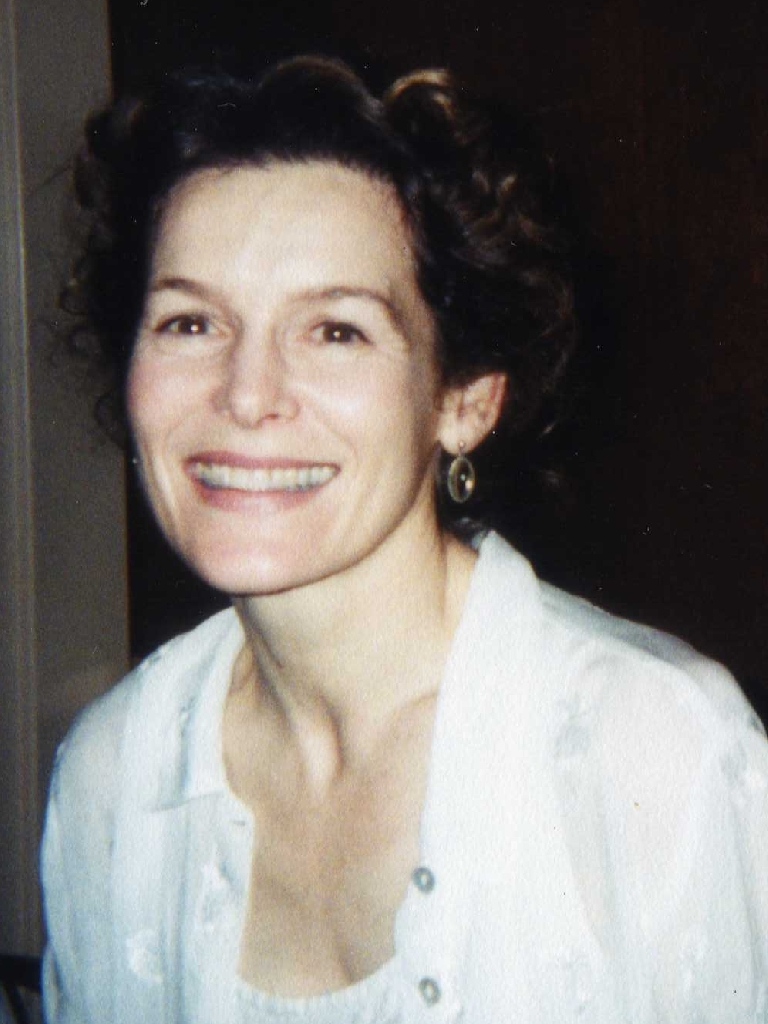
- Krige in 2008
- Born: Alice Maud Krige; 28 June 1954 (age 72); Upington, Northern Cape, South Africa
- Education: Rhodes University; Royal Central School of Speech and Drama
- Occupation: Actress
- Years active: 1976–present
- Spouse: Paul Schoolman (m. 1988)

Alice Maud Krige (Afrikaans: [ˈkriχə]; born 28 June 1954) is a South African actress. Her big break came in 1981, when she starred as the Gilbert and Sullivan singer Sybil Gordon in the British historical film Chariots of Fire, and as Eva Galli / Alma Mobley in the American supernatural horror film Ghost Story. She received a Laurence Olivier Award for her performance in the West End theatre production of Arms and the Man (1981) and later joined the Royal Shakespeare Company.

Krige starred in various British, South African, European, and American films throughout her career. She starred in King David (1985), Barfly (1987), Haunted Summer (1988), See You in the Morning (1989), Sleepwalkers (1992), and Institute Benjamenta (1995). She played the role of the Borg Queen in the science fiction film Star Trek: First Contact (1996), for which she received a Saturn Award for Best Supporting Actress, and reprised the role in Star Trek: Voyager (2001), Star Trek: The Experience: Borg Invasion 4-D (2004), Star Trek: Lower Decks (2021), and Star Trek: Picard (2023). Subsequent notable film appearances include The Little Vampire (2000), Silent Hill (2006), Skin (2008), Solomon Kane (2009), The Sorcerer's Apprentice (2010), Thor: The Dark World (2013), A Christmas Prince (2017) and its two sequels, and Gretel & Hansel (2020). She played Veronica Ghent in the psychological horror drama film She Will (2021).

On television, Krige played Lucie Manette in the 1980 historical drama film A Tale of Two Cities, appeared in The Professionals (1982), the miniseries Ellis Island (1984) and Dream West (1986), the Holocaust drama Wallenberg: A Hero's Story (1985), and as Patsy Cline in the comedy-drama Baja Oklahoma (1988). In later years, Krige played Lady Jessica in Frank Herbert's Children of Dune (2003), Natalie Wood's mother in The Mystery of Natalie Wood (2004), Joan Collins in Dynasty: The Making of a Guilty Pleasure (2005), and Lady Russell in Persuasion (2007). Her regular roles include Tyrant (2014–15), The Syndicate (2015), and The OA (2016–19).

== Early life and education ==
Krige was born in Upington, Cape Province (now Northern Cape), South Africa on 28 June 1954, the daughter of Patricia, a professor of psychology, and Louis Krige, a physician. She is of Afrikaner and German descent. The Kriges later moved to Port Elizabeth, where Alice grew up in what she has described as a "very happy family", with two brothers, one of whom became a physician and the other a professor of surgery.

Krige attended Rhodes University in Grahamstown, South Africa with plans to become a clinical psychologist. She turned to acting after taking an acting class at Rhodes, then completed a Bachelor of Arts degree and a BA Hons degree in drama, with distinction. She went on to London to attend, and graduate from, the Central School of Speech and Drama.

== Career ==
Krige made her professional debut playing the female lead in the 1976 South African romantic drama film Vergeet My Nie directed by Elmo De Witt.

She moved to England in 1979, when she made her debut on British television appearing in an episode of BBC2 Playhouse. The following year, Krige starred as Lucie Manette in the American historical television film A Tale of Two Cities opposite Chris Sarandon. She went on to play Sybil Gordon in the British historical film Chariots of Fire and Eva Galli/Alma Mobley in Ghost Story, both released in 1981.

She then joined the Royal Shakespeare Company, playing Cordelia in King Lear and in Edward Bond's Lear, Miranda in The Tempest, Bianca in The Taming of the Shrew, and Roxanne in Cyrano de Bergerac. She also appeared in plays such as Thomas Otway's Venice Preserv'd at the Almeida Theatre in London, and Toyer at the Arts Theatre in the West End.

After her big screen breakthrough, Krige went on to star in a number of made-for-television movies and miniseries. She starred in the three-part CBS miniseries Ellis Island in 1984 based on 1983 novel of the same title. She starred alongside Richard Chamberlain in the television film Wallenberg: A Hero's Story (1985) and the miniseries Dream West (1986). Her other television films include Second Serve (1986), Baja Oklahoma (1988) playing country singer Patsy Cline, and Max and Helen (1990).

Krige played Bathsheba in the 1985 epic film King David opposite Richard Gere. The film was not well received by the critics and was also a box-office failure, grossing $5.9 million worldwide against its $21 million production budget. In 1987, she starred alongside Mickey Rourke and Faye Dunaway in the black comedy film Barfly, which received positive reviews from critics. The following year she played Mary Shelley in the period drama film Haunted Summer. In 1989, Krige played the female lead opposite Jeff Bridges in the romantic comedy-drama film, See You in the Morning.

In 1992, Krige starred in the horror film Sleepwalkers written by Stephen King and directed by Mick Garris. Later that year she guest-starred in an episode of popular teen drama series, Beverly Hills, 90210 playing beautiful ranch owner named Anne who dated Luke Perry's character. She appeared in a made-for-television movies Judgment Day: The John List Story (1993), Jack Reed: Badge of Honor (1993), Sharpe's Honour (1994), Donor Unknown (1995), Devil's Advocate (1995), Hidden in America (1996), Indefensible: The Truth About Edward Brannigan (1997), and Deep in My Heart (1999). She starred in the 1991 miniseries Strauss Dynasty about Strauss family of Vienna, and well as Scarlet and Black (1993) and Joseph (1995). She received CableACE Award nomination for her performance in the anthology series The Hidden Room in 1992. In 1995, she starred in the critically acclaimed drama film Institute Benjamenta directed by Brothers Quay. She later appeared in Habitat (1997), Twilight of the Ice Nymphs (1998), The Commissioner (1998) and Molokai: The Story of Father Damien (1999).

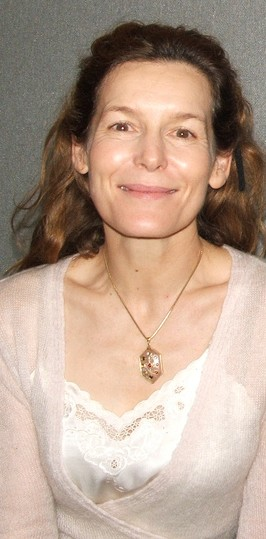
Krige in 2006

In 1996, Krige starred in the science fiction film Star Trek: First Contact, playing the role of the Borg Queen, who attempts to assimilate Earth into the Borg collective. For that performance, she won the 1996 Saturn Award for Best Supporting Actress presented at the 1997 Saturn Awards. She returned to this character in the Star Trek game Star Trek: Armada II and in the Star Trek: Voyager series finale "Endgame" in 2001. In 2021, she reprised her role as the Borg Queen in voice only for the animated series Star Trek: Lower Decks, to be followed in 2023 again voicing the Borg Queen in the series finale of Star Trek: Picard. The character was named the greatest villain in Star Trek history.

In 2000, Krige appeared in two genre films: the horror comedy The Little Vampire and the supernatural horror The Calling. She appeared in Reign of Fire (2002), Stay Alive, Lonely Hearts and The Contract (all released in 2006). Also in 2006, Krige played Christabella, the main antagonist of the supernatural horror film Silent Hill.

In 2008, she starred in the biographical drama film Skin alongside Sophie Okonedo and Sam Neill receiving positive reviews. The film explores the issues of the girl being classified as "Coloured" by the South African authorities during Apartheid, although her parents were white. In 2012, Krige produced the award-winning feature Jail Caesar, an exploration of the little known adolescence of Julius Caesar, filmed in three working prisons with several hundred serving prisoners and an ensemble of actors including Derek Jacobi and John Kani. Jail Caesar was written and directed by Paul Schoolman. Her later credits including Solomon Kane (2009), The Sorcerer's Apprentice (2010), Will (2011), and Thor: The Dark World (2013).

Krige's science fiction career has expanded into television, with prominent roles in miniseries adaptations of Dinotopia (2002) and Frank Herbert's Children of Dune (2003).

She played Natalie Wood's mother in the 2004 made-for-television movie The Mystery of Natalie Wood, and starred as Joan Collins in Dynasty: The Making of a Guilty Pleasure (2005). She starred in the BBC Two drama The Line of Beauty in 2006. She had recurring roles on Deadwood, and guest starred on Six Feet Under, Law & Order: Criminal Intent, The 4400, Dirty Sexy Money and NCIS.

In 2011, Krige appeared in the BBC's final season of Spooks, playing Russian double agent Elena Gavrik. Krige also featured in the final season of the BBC drama Waking the Dead, in 2011. She played the role of Amira in the first and second series of Tyrant for F/X, and worked for the BBC on the series The Syndicate and Partners in Crime. In 2016, she starred on the Netflix mystery series, The OA.

In 2017, Krige starred as Queen Helena Charlton in the Christmas romantic comedy film, A Christmas Prince for Netflix. She reprised her role in two sequels: A Christmas Prince: The Royal Wedding (2018) and A Christmas Prince: The Royal Baby (2019). In 2020 she starred in the dark fantasy horror film, Gretel & Hansel playing the role of The Witch. In 2021, she played the leading role in the psychological horror drama film She Will playing the role of aging film star. Krige received positive reviews for her performance. Also that year she appeared opposite Max von Sydow in the drama film Echoes of the Past. In 2022, Krige appeared in the slasher film Texas Chainsaw Massacre for Netflix.

== Recognition ==
She earned a Plays and Players Award, as well as a Laurence Olivier Award for Most Promising Newcomer, after appearing in a 1981 West End theatre production of George Bernard Shaw's Arms and the Man.

For her performance as the Borg Queen in Star Trek: First Contact, she received a 1996 Saturn Award for Best Supporting Actress.

In April 2004, Krige was awarded an honorary Litt.D. degree from Rhodes University.

In 2015, Krige received the Special Jury Award at the International Film Festival for Peace, Inspiration and Equality in Jakarta, along with Andy Garcia and Jimmy Carter for her performance in the film Shingetsu, in which she played a war-traumatised surgeon of Doctors Without Borders, opposite Gunter Singer.

== Personal life ==
Krige married writer and director Paul Schoolman in 1988.

== Filmography ==
Key
†	Denotes films that have not yet been released

=== Film ===
Year	Title	Role	Notes
1976	Vergeet My Nie	Welma de Villiers	
1981	Chariots of Fire	Sybil Gordon	
1981	Ghost Story	Eva Galli / Alma Mobley	
1985	King David	Bathsheba	
1987	Barfly	Tully Sorenson	
1988	Haunted Summer	Mary Wollstonecraft Godwin	
1989	See You in the Morning	Beth Goodwin	
1992	Sleepwalkers	Mary Brady	Fangoria Chainsaw Award for Best Supporting Actress; Fantafestival Award for Best Actress
1992	Spies Inc.	Isabelle	
1994	Sea Beggars	Wife	Short film
1995	Institute Benjamenta	Lisa Benjamenta	
1996	Star Trek: First Contact	Borg Queen	Saturn Award for Best Supporting Actress
1996	Amanda	Audrey Farnsworth	
1997	Habitat	Clarissa Symes	
1997	Twilight of the Ice Nymphs	Zephyr Eccles	
1998	The Commissioner	Isabelle Morton	
1999	Molokai: The Story of Father Damien	Mother Marianne Cope	
2000	The Little Vampire	Freda Sackville-Bagg	
2000	The Calling	Elizabeth Plummer	
2001	Superstition	Mirella Cenci	
2001	Vallen	Monique	
2002	Reign of Fire	Karen Abercromby	
2004	Star Trek: The Experience - Borg Invasion 4D	Borg Queen	Short film
2004	Shadow of Fear	Margie Henderson	
2006	Stay Alive	The Author	
2006	Silent Hill	Christabella LaRoache	
2006	Lonely Hearts	Janet Long	
2006	The Contract	Agent Gwen Miles	
2007	Ten Inch Hero	Zo	
2008	Skin	Sannie Laing	
2008	The Betrayed	Falco	
2009	Solomon Kane	Katherine Crowthorn	
2010	The Sorcerer's Apprentice	Morgana le Fay	
2011	Will	Sister Carmel	
2012	Jail Caesar	Pirate Captain	Also producer Nominated — Raindance Film Festival Jury Prize for Best UK Feature
2013	Thor: The Dark World	Eir	
2017	The Little Vampire 3D	Freda Sackville-Bagg	Voice
2017	A Christmas Prince	Queen Helena	
2018	A Christmas Prince: The Royal Wedding	Queen Helena	
2018	A Rose in Winter	Anna Reinach	
2019	A Christmas Prince: The Royal Baby	Queen Helena	
2020	Gretel & Hansel	Holda/The Witch	Nominated — Fangoria Chainsaw Award for Best Supporting Performance
2020	Shingetsu	Woman	Also producer
2020	The Bay of Silence	Vivian	
2021	She Will	Veronica Ghent	
2021	Echoes of the Past	Andrea Foss	
2022	Texas Chainsaw Massacre	Virginia "Ginny" McCumber	
2025	Wildcat	Christina Vine	

=== Television ===
Year	Title	Role	Notes
1980	BBC2 Playhouse	Emily	Episode: "The Happy Autumn Fields"
1980	A Tale of Two Cities	Lucie Manette	TV film
1980	The Professionals	Diana Molner	Episode: "Operation Susie"
1983	Arms and the Man	Raina	Filmed stage production
1984	Ellis Island	Bridget O'Donnell	TV miniseries
1985	Wallenberg: A Hero's Story	Baroness Lisl Kemeny	TV film
1985	Murder, She Wrote	Nita Cochran	Episode: "Murder in the Afternoon"
1986	Dream West	Jessie Benton Fremont	TV miniseries
1986	Second Serve	Gwen	TV film
1988	Baja Oklahoma	Patsy Cline	TV film
1990	Max and Helen	Helen Weiss	TV film
1991	The Strauss Dynasty	Olga	TV miniseries
1991	The Hidden Room	Jennifer	Episode: "Dream Child"; Nominated — CableACE Award for Best Actress in a Dramatic Series
1991	L'Amérique en otage	Parveneh Limbert	TV film
1992	Ladykiller	May Packard	TV film
1992	Beverly Hills, 90210	Anne Berrisford	Episode: "Wild Horses"
1993	Judgment Day: The John List Story	Jean Syfert	TV film
1993	Double Deception	Pamela Sparrow	TV film
1993	Jack Reed: Badge of Honor	Joan Anatole	TV film
1993	Scarlet and Black	Madame de Renal	TV miniseries
1994	Sharpe's Honour	La Marquesa	TV film
1995	Joseph	Rachel	TV film
1995	Donor Unknown	Alice Stillman	TV film
1995	Devil's Advocate	Alessandra Locatelli	TV film
1996	Hidden in America	Dee	TV film
1997	Indefensible: The Truth About Edward Brannigan	Rebecca Daly	TV film
1998	Close Relations	Louise	TV miniseries
1998	Welcome to Paradox	Aura Mendoza	Episode: "Acute Triangle"
1999	Deep in My Heart	Annalise Jurgenson	TV film
1999	Becker	Dr. Sandra Rush	Episode: "Activate Your Choices"
1999	In the Company of Spies	Sarah Gold	TV film
2001	Attila	Galla Placidia	TV miniseries
2001	Star Trek: Voyager	Borg Queen	Episode: "Endgame"
2002	Six Feet Under	Alma	Episodes: "Out, Out, Brief Candle" and "The Plan"
2002	Dinotopia	Rosemary Waldo	TV miniseries
2003	Children of Dune	Lady Jessica	TV miniseries
2003	The Death and Life of Nancy Eaton	Snubby Eaton	TV film
2004	The Mystery of Natalie Wood	Maria Gurdin	TV film
2003, 2004	Threat Matrix	Senator Lily Randolph	Episodes: "Flipping" and "19 Seconds"
2005	Dynasty: The Making of a Guilty Pleasure	Joan Collins	TV film
2005	Deadwood	Maddie	5 episodes
2006	Law & Order: Criminal Intent	Gillian Booth	Episode: "Dramma Giocoso"
2006	The Line of Beauty	Rachel Fedden	TV miniseries
2006	The 4400	Sarah	Episodes: "Gone: Part 1" and "Gone: Part 2"
2007	Persuasion	Lady Russell	TV film Nominated — Monte-Carlo Television Festival for Best Performance by an Actress
2007	Heroes and Villains	Letizia	Episode: "Napoleon"
2008	Dirty Sexy Money	Judge Alexis Wyeth	Episode: "The Family Lawyer"
2009	Midsomer Murders	Jenny Frazer	Episode: "Secrets and Spies"
2011	Waking the Dead	Karen Harding	Episodes: "Care: Part 1" and "Care: Part 2"
2011	Page Eight	Emma Baron	TV film
2011	Spooks	Elena Gavrik	6 episodes
2014	Tyrant	Amira Al Fayeed	20 episodes
2014	NCIS	Margaret Clark	Episode: "So It Goes"
2015	The Syndicate	Lady Hazelwood	6 episodes
2015	Partners in Crime	Rita Vandemeyer	Episodes: "The Secret Adversary: Part 1" and "The Secret Adversary: Part 2"
2016–2019	The OA	Nancy Johnson	Season 1 (2016): 8 episodes Season 2 (2019): Episode: "Angel of Death"
2019	Carnival Row	Aoife Tsigani	Recurring role
2020	The Alienist: Angel of Darkness	Elizabeth Cady Stanton	2 episodes
2021	Star Trek: Lower Decks	Borg Queen (voice)	Episode: "I, Excretus"
2023	Son of a Critch	Millicent Hearn	Episode: "Old Friends, New Friends"
2023	Star Trek: Picard	Borg Queen	2 episodes
2025	The Rig	Morgan Lennox	Season 2
