= Jail Caesar =

- Film poster
- Directed by: Paul Schoolman
- Written by: Paul Schoolman
- Produced by: Paul Schoolman; Alice Krige
- Starring: Derek Jacobi; John Kani; Alice Krige
- Cinematography: Paul Schoolman
- Edited by: Sahil Gill
- Music by: Christoph Bauschinger; Ruban Byrne; William Close; Jo Quail; Joanna Quail
- Production company: Caesar Productions
- Distributed by: D Street Releasing
- Release date: 28 June 2012 (Moscow)
- Running time: 90 minutes
- Countries: United Kingdom; Canada; South Africa
- Languages: English; Afrikaans; Xhosa

Jail Caesar is a 2012 British-South African-Canadian historical drama film written and directed by Paul Schoolman and starring Derek Jacobi, John Kani and Alice Krige.

== Cast ==
- Derek Jacobi as Sulla
- John Kani as Marius
- Alice Krige as Pirate Captain
- Warren Adler as Caesar
- Peter John Christiaans as Cicero
- Richard Clifford as Marcus Thermus
- Grant Swamby as Crassus
- Gunter Singer as The Swooper
- Vaneshran Arumugam as Cinna
- Grethe Fox as Nicopolis
- Bo Petersen as Aurelia
- Denwor Ohlson as Mr. O
