= See You in the Morning (film) =

1989 film

- Theatrical release poster
- Directed by: Alan J. Pakula
- Written by: Alan J. Pakula
- Produced by: Alan J. Pakula; Susan Solt
- Starring: Jeff Bridges; Alice Krige; Farrah Fawcett; Drew Barrymore; Lukas Haas; David Dukes; Frances Sternhagen; George Hearn; Theodore Bikel; Linda Lavin
- Cinematography: Donald McAlpine
- Edited by: Evan A. Lottman
- Music by: Michael Small
- Production company: Lorimar Productions
- Distributed by: Warner Bros. Pictures
- Release date: 14 April 1989
- Running time: 119 minutes
- Country: United States
- Language: English
- Box office: $4,795,009 (United States)

See You in the Morning is a 1989 American romantic comedy-drama film written and directed by Alan J. Pakula, and starring Jeff Bridges, Alice Krige and Farrah Fawcett. It features music by Nat King Cole and Cherri Red. The film's music was composed by Michael Small.

== Plot ==
Beth Goodwin is a happily married mother of two children, living with her pianist husband Peter. Psychiatrist Larry Livingstone is living in New York with wife Jo and their two young children. Three years later, Peter suddenly becomes paralyzed in his hands and takes his own life, leaving Beth and the children heartbroken. Larry is abandoned by his wife and two children, who have moved to London since the split.

Larry is introduced to Beth at a party thrown by Martin and Sidney, and an immediate attraction ensues. Larry is distracted, though, by the attendance of Jo, who has shown up with her new flame, actor Jack. At the end of the night, he goes home with Beth, and is welcomed by her children Cathy and Petey.

Even though Jo's mother Neenie criticizes him for having given up on his marriage with Jo too fast, Larry continues to see Beth. He introduces his children Robin and Billy to the Goodwins, but they do not blend well together. Robin blames her father for replacing Jo with Beth, and a planned wedding is postponed due to the continuing friction. Sidney, Beth's best friend, advises her to give Larry another chance, explaining how love is not always perfect by giving the example of how Martin once committed adultery. Simultaneously, Larry dresses up as Cupid and convinces her to marry him.

Beth soon starts to worry about their future, fearing that Larry will one day abandon her the way Peter did. Larry proposes they move to another apartment, explaining that their current residence will always be Cathy and Petey's father's place. Beth's children are opposed to a move. While Beth is overseas for work, daughter Cathy starts to rebel and is arrested for shoplifting at Bloomingdale's. Larry continues to feel vulnerable to Jo, whose mother is revealed to be dying, prompting Jo to leave the children with Larry.

Since the death of Neenie, Larry's focus is on comforting his ex-wife and kids. Jo admits that she still loves him, leaving Larry uncertain what to do. He assures Beth that he did not commit adultery, despite feeling connected to Jo. Cathy and Petey mistake Larry and Beth's night of making love for a violent struggle. They fear that something bad has happened, making the children realize how much they actually appreciate Larry. The whole family agrees to move to a new house.

== Cast ==
- Jeff Bridges as Larry Livingstone
- Alice Krige as Beth Goodwin
- Farrah Fawcett as Jo Livingstone
- Drew Barrymore as Cathy Goodwin
- Lukas Haas as Petey Goodwin
- David Dukes as Peter Goodwin
- Frances Sternhagen as Neenie
- George Hearn as Martin
- Theodore Bikel as Bronie
- Linda Lavin as Aunt Sidney
- Heather Lilly as Robin Livingstone
- Macaulay Culkin as Billy Livingstone
- Tom Aldredge as Beth's Father
- William LeMassena as Mr. Livingstone
- Dorothy Dean as Mrs. Livingstone
- Kate Wilkinson as Aunt Matilda
- Christopher Curry as Larry's Brother
- Betsy Aidem as Larry's Sister-in-Law

== Critical reception ==
Vincent Canby of The New York Times criticized the film's script, but praised the cast:

Considering the fashionable phoniness of the narrative, the actors do very well... Even the child actors, including Drew Barrymore, are not bad.

Roger Ebert of the Chicago Sun-Times gave it two and a half stars out of four and also felt that the script was not great but that the actors did well:

What almost redeems See You in the Morning are the performances.

On the review aggregator website Rotten Tomatoes, 55% of 11 critics' reviews are positive.
