= Haunted Summer =

1988 drama film

- Theatrical release poster
- Directed by: Ivan Passer
- Written by: Lewis John Carlino
- Based on: Haunted Summer by Anne Edwards
- Produced by: Martin Poll
- Starring: Philip Anglim; Laura Dern; Alice Krige; Eric Stoltz; Alex Winter
- Cinematography: Giuseppe Rotunno
- Edited by: Cesare D'Amico; Rick Fields
- Music by: Christopher Young
- Distributed by: Cannon Films
- Release date: December 16, 1988
- Running time: 106 minutes
- Country: United States
- Language: English
- Budget: $6 million

Haunted Summer is a 1988 romantic period-drama film directed by Ivan Passer. The film is a fictionalized retelling of the Shelleys' visit to Lord Byron in Villa Diodati by Lake Geneva, which led to the writing of Frankenstein.

== Plot summary ==
In 1816, authors Lord Byron, Percy Shelley, and Mary Shelley (née Godwin) get together for some philosophical discussions, but the situation soon deteriorates into mind games, drugs, and sex. It is the summer that Lord Byron and the Shelleys, together with Byron's doctor, John William Polidori, spent in the isolated Villa Diodati by Lake Geneva. There they held a contest to produce the best horror story, so as to kill the dullness of summer. The contest led to one of the world's most famous books being given life — Mary Shelley's Frankenstein.

== Cast ==
- Philip Anglim as Lord Byron
- Eric Stoltz as Percy Shelley
- Alice Krige as Mary Wollstonecraft Godwin
- Alex Winter as Dr. John William Polidori
- Laura Dern as Claire Clairmont

== Development ==
In 1971, Daily Variety announced a film on the subject, based on a 12-page treatment by Anne Edwards, but it was not made: instead, Edwards turned her outline into a young adult novel, published in 1972. This in turn was optioned by MGM, to be directed by Martin Scorsese from a screenplay by Frederic Raphael, but the film had still not been made by the time the option lapsed in 1984. Producer Martin Poll bought the rights and hired Lewis John Carlino to adapt. In 1986, Variety reported that John Huston had agreed to direct and was insisting on the casting of largely unknown British actors (including Alice Krige, actually born in South Africa, as Mary), but Huston's declining health subsequently forced him to drop out; Czech director Ivan Passer took on the project. Unlike Huston, Passer preferred American actors, and recast the roles of Percy and Claire with Eric Stoltz and Laura Dern. Hollywood Reporter announced that Rupert Everett was to play Byron, but Philip Anglim replaced him shortly before filming started.

== Production ==
Principal photography began in May 1987 and ran until July. Passer was so keen to cast Stoltz as Percy that he delayed production by seven months. Location shooting took place in Switzerland and Italy, with Lake Como doubling as Lake Geneva, on whose shores the movie's main events happened; finally, sound-stage filming (including a rainstorm scene shot in a water tank) took place in Malta. Hollywood Reporter gave the film's final cost as $6 million.

== Reception ==
The film opened in Los Angeles on 16 December 1988. By the time of its release, Ken Russell's Gothic, about the same events, had already appeared, but Michael Wilmington, reviewing for The Los Angeles Times, compared Passer's more restrained film favourably:

Carlino has given us exactly what Russell’s scenarist, Stephen Volk didn’t: a sense of Shelley and Byron as poets, of Mary and Polidori as novelists, a real delight in the kind of language they used and their own relish in using it.

He approved of the deliberate, "anachronistic" casting of Americans and suggested parallels between the film's historical moment and the late 1960s "summer of free love".

By contrast, Haunted Summer was not released in New York until the summer of 1989, when it played briefly as half of a double bill with the same director's Cutter's Way. Caryn James wrote in The New York Times,

it cannot have been easy to turn material so rich with imagination and drama into such a tepid, excruciatingly slow film. Mr. Passer seems to have no defense against Lewis John Carlino's inept screenplay... the characters soon appear as shallow libertines, posturing ninnies who spout the most effete period dialogue.

Like Wilmington, she contrasted the film with Gothic, but preferred Russell's film, concluding by calling Haunted Summer "supremely disappointing".

By the time of its New York premiere, the film had gone on release in Britain. Derek Malcolm in The Guardian, like James, compared it invidiously with Gothic: "hardly an ounce of humour or visual flair, despite the fact that Giuseppe Rotunno shot it". The Sunday Telegraph was equally dismissive ("For unintended humour, try Ivan Passer's Haunted Summer"), calling it "Ken Russell's Gothic minus the monsters". David Robinson in The Times struck a similar note ("the emotional entanglements are not much more enthralling than flirtations and quarrels on a Saga Holidays tour"), but at least praised the film's look and the performances, particularly Laura Dern's.

== See also ==
Other films about this meeting of authors include the following:

- Gothic (1986 film)
- Rowing with the Wind (1988 film)
- Mary Shelley (2017 film)
