= Max and Helen =

- Based on: Max and Helen by Simon Wiesenthal
- Screenplay by: Corey Blechman
- Directed by: Philip Saville
- Starring: Treat Williams; Alice Krige; Martin Landau; Jonny Phillips; Adam Kotz; Jodhi May
- Composer: Christopher Young
- Countries of origin: United States; United Kingdom
- Original language: English

Production
- Producer: Steven R. McGlothen
- Cinematography: Elemér Ragályi
- Editor: Skip Schoolnik
- Running time: 100 minutes
- Production companies: Turner Pictures; Citadel Entertainment

Original release
- Network: TNT
- Release: January 8, 1990

Max and Helen is a 1990 American drama film directed by Philip Saville and written by Corey Blechman. It is based on the 1982 book Max and Helen by Simon Wiesenthal. The film stars Treat Williams, Alice Krige, Martin Landau, Jonny Phillips, Adam Kotz and Jodhi May. The film premiered on TNT on January 8, 1990.

== Plot ==
Based on the fact-based novel by Nazi-hunter Simon Wiesenthal based on his 1962 prosecution of the head of a German factory whom he learns was a murderous labor camp commandant. To be able to take him to justice, he must find witnesses who can help him. In his quest to find and prosecute the former commander of a Nazi labor camp, Simon Wiesenthal (Martin Landau) goes in search of witnesses to the man's crimes. Eventually, he encounters Max Rosenberg (Treat Williams), who along with his long-lost fiancée, Helen (Alice Krige), was imprisoned at the camp. Max reluctantly tells Wiesenthal a long tale of love and loss in a time of terror. Wiesenthal has no idea that Max's story will prompt him to make a previously unimaginable decision, though.

== Cast ==
- Treat Williams as Max Rosenberg
- Alice Krige as Helen Weiss
- Martin Landau as Simon Wiesenthal
- Jonny Phillips as Werner Schultze / Mark Weiss
- Adam Kotz as Peter
- Jodhi May as Miriam Weiss
- Nicholas Woodeson as Martin Greenbaum
- Lulee Fisher as Judith
- Ian Bartholomew as Magistrate
- Zoltán Gera as Elderly Man
- John Grillo as Joseph Weiss
- Aviva Goldkorn as Mrs. Weiss
- Béla Jáki as SS Officer / Camp
- Richard Kane as Businessman
- István Kanitzsai as SS Officer Train
- Péter Kertész as Otto
- János Kulka as Berek
- Ági Margitai as Wanda
- Mátyás Margittai as Balke
- Ferenc Némethy as Ackerman
- Gábor Salinger as Gershan
- Ottó Ulmann as Rubin
