= Jonny Phillips (actor) =

English actor

- Born: Jonathan Mark Phillips; 5 September 1963 (age 62); London, England
- Education: Laureate Academy; Royal Academy of Dramatic Art
- Occupation: Actor
- Years active: 1985–present
- Spouse: Yolanda Vazquez (m. 1989)
- Children: 2

Jonathan Mark Phillips (born 5 September 1963) is an English actor. He is best known for portraying Charles Lightoller in the film Titanic (1997).

== Life and career ==
Philips is best known for his portrayal of 2nd Officer Charles Lightoller in the 1997 blockbuster film Titanic. He also appeared in an episode of Midsomer Murders, "Country Matters".

In 2012, he appeared in an episode of I Shouldn't Be Alive, a documentary television series, as David Hunt.

Also in 2012, Phillips starred in a new series, Hunted, on BBC One and HBO. He plays DI 'Evertt', a corrupt police Detective Inspector.

In 2013, he appeared in an episode of Death in Paradise credited as Jonny Phillips. Since 2014, Phillips has played a leading role of Fr Crowe in the webseries The Outer Darkness.

In 2014, he appeared as Alistair Stoke, a neurosurgeon, in "Entry Wounds Pt 1" in series 8 of Lewis.

== Theatre ==
Year	Title	Role	Company	Director	Notes
2011	Dunsinane	Siward	National Theatre of Scotland / Royal Shakespeare Company	Roxana Silbert	play by David Greig

== Selected filmography ==
- Rumpelstiltskin (1987) – Ralph
- Prick Up Your Ears (1987) – Youth Outside Lavatory
- Sleeping Beauty (1987) – Count
- The Last of England (1987) – Various roles
- Killing Dad or How to Love Your Mother (1990) – Terry
- Max and Helen (1990)
- Clarissa (1991) (TV miniseries) – James
- The Mystery of Edwin Drood (1993) – Edwin Drood
- Agatha Christie’s Poirot (1993) – Charles Leverson
- The Infiltrator (1995 film) – Mahlich
- Titanic (1997) – 2nd Officer Charles Lightoller
- The Quarry (1998) – Captain Mong
- Beautiful People (1999) – Brian North
- The Last Great Wilderness (2002) – Vincente
- One for the Road (2003) – Ian
- Vanity Fair (2004) – Mr. Wenham
- The Edge of Love (2008) – John Eldridge
- Bronson (2008) – Prison Governor
- Big Things (2009) – Graham Beace
- You Instead (2011) – Jay
- The Village (2013) – Wylie
- The Death of Stalin (2017) – NKVD Officer Pervak
