= Tammi Øst =

Danish actress (born 1958)

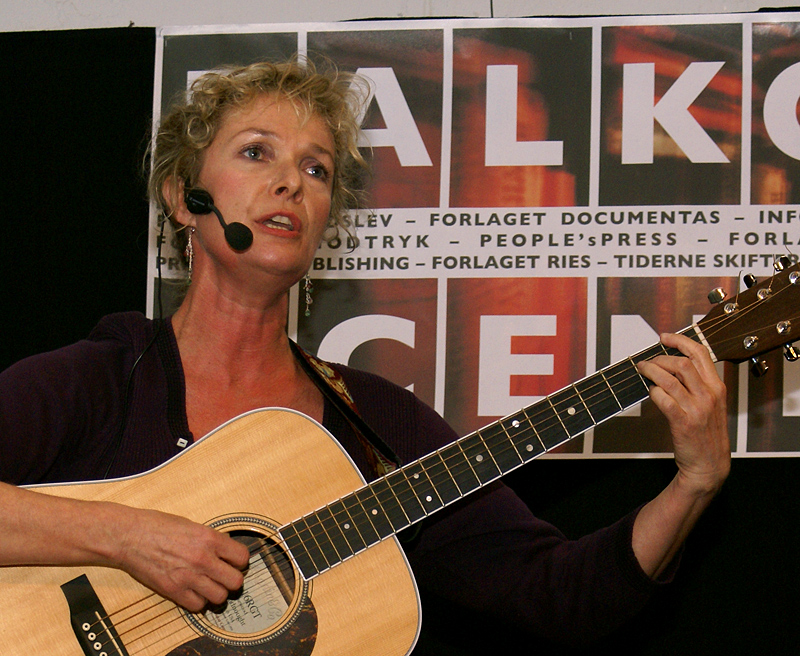
Tammi Øst

Tammi Øst (born 1 October 1958) is a Danish actress.

Øst was born in Copenhagen, and was trained at the Danish National School of Theatre and Contemporary Dance in 1982. In 1988 she played the leading role of Katinka in Max von Sydow's film of the same name. From 1990 to 1997 she worked at the Royal Theatre and received the Dannebrog in 1996. In 1999 she received the Reumert prize for Best leading actress. In 2012 she portrayed Birgit Eggert in the TV series Forbrydelsen III.

Øst was married to actor Mikael Birkkjær, and has two children. Her daughter, Andrea Øst Birkkjær, is an actress. She is now married to Jens Jørn Spottag.

== Selected filmography ==
- Suzanne og Leonard (1984)
- Min farmors hus (1984)
- Når engle elsker (1985)
- Katinka (Ved vejen) (1988)
- Mig og Mama Mia – Tarzan mama mia (1989)
- Mimi og madammerne (1998)
- Send mere slik (2001)
- En kort en lang (2001)
- Ørnen (2004)
- Rene hjerter (2006)
- Anna Pihl (2006 – 2008)
- Kvinden der drømte om en mand (2010)
