= Indefensible: The Truth About Edward Brannigan =

1997 American TV film directed by Brian Dennehy

- Genre: Drama
- Written by: Joe Cacaci
- Directed by: Brian Dennehy
- Starring: Brian Dennehy; Reed Diamond; Alice Krige
- Theme music composer: Dana Kaproff
- Country of origin: United States
- Original language: English

Production
- Executive producers: Joe Cacaci; Brian Dennehy; Carla Singer
- Producer: Joan Carson
- Cinematography: Rodney Charters
- Editor: Peter V. White
- Running time: 91 minutes

Original release
- Network: CBS
- Release: November 25, 1997

Indefensible: The Truth About Edward Brannigan (also known as A Father's Betrayal) is a 1997 American drama television film. The film is directed by Brian Dennehy and stars Dennehy, Reed Diamond and Alice Krige. It first aired on November 25, 1997, on the CBS television network.

== Plot ==
Edward "Eddie" Brannigan, a prestigious veteran lawyer, gives a dinner party at his home to celebrate what for him is an honor: He's healed a relationship with his lawyer son Eddie Jr. and will be working in his office. Eddie Sr. invites elementary school teacher Rebecca, whom he had previously met, to the dinner party, and as the guests depart, Eddie Sr. and Rebecca are left alone on the couch. However, the guests soon return after hearing a commotion; they find a distraught Rebecca claiming that Eddie Sr. had raped her, which Eddie Sr. denies. After Rebecca files charges, Eddie Jr. initially can't believe what's being leveled at his father, until a talk with his mother and Eddie Sr.'s ex-wife Monica reveals damning info. From then on, Eddie Sr.'s friends, neighbors and associates are split on whether they trust him or not.

== Cast ==
- Brian Dennehy as Edward "Eddie" Brannigan Sr.
- Reed Diamond as Edward "Eddie" Brannigan Jr.
- Alice Krige as Rebecca Daly
- Michael David Simms as Allan "Al" Disanto
- Lori Triolo as Katherine Trentini
- Donnelly Rhodes as Jack Bailey
- Lorena Gale as Cheryl Drew
- Benjamin Ratner as Paul Suarez
- Lynn Redgrave as Monica Brannigan
- Addison Ridge as Matthew Daly
- Nancy Kerr as Leslie
- Jane Perry as Dr. Jan Royce
- Nina Roman as Judge Holloway
- Anne Farquhar as Priscilla Cunningham
- Mark Brandon as Mitch Hayes
- Kathryn Anderson
- Alf Humphreys as Father Lomax (as Alf Humphries)
- Ken Camroux as Police Chief Harris
- Kendall Cross as Susan

== Production ==
The film was shot in Vancouver, British Columbia, Canada.

== Reception ==
Writing for Radio Times, David Parkinson said of the film that "there are echoes here of Presumed Innocent," a film Dennehy had previously appeared in. "However," Parkinson added, "Dennehy's direction is far more perfunctory than that of Alan J. Pakula, although he still manages to sustain the attention as the case reveals unsuspected aspects of his life. Alice Krige is persuasive as the 'victim' and Lynn Redgrave solid as Dennehy's ex-wife." Carole Horst's summary of the film for Variety stated, "Slick, with a sharp script that harbors a couple of weak spots, and standout perfs from Alice Krige and Brian Dennehy, 'Indefensible: The Truth About Edward Brannigan' is a mouthful of a title but a sensitive study of the breakdown of archaic gender roles and date rape." In New York Magazine, John Leonard said, "Nothing new here except first-grade performances and some thumping style."
