= She Will (film) =

2021 film by Charlotte Colbert

- Theatrical release poster
- Directed by: Charlotte Colbert
- Written by: Kitty Percy; Charlotte Colbert
- Produced by: Jessica Malik; Bob Last
- Starring: Alice Krige; Kota Eberhardt; Rupert Everett; Malcolm McDowell
- Cinematography: Jamie D. Ramsay
- Edited by: Yorgos Mavropsaridis; Matyas Fekete
- Music by: Clint Mansell
- Production companies: Popcorn Group; Pressman Films; Rocket Science; Selkie Productions; Intermission Film; Filmgate Films
- Distributed by: Vertigo Releasing
- Release dates: 5 August 2021 (Locarno); 22 July 2022 (United Kingdom)
- Running time: 95 minutes
- Country: United Kingdom
- Language: English

She Will is a 2021 British psychological horror drama film co-written and directed by Charlotte Colbert in her feature directorial debut. The film was produced by Jessica Malik and Bob Last, with Dario Argento and Edward R. Pressman among the executive producers. The film stars Alice Krige, Kota Eberhardt, Rupert Everett and Malcolm McDowell, with John McCrea, Amy Manson, Jonathan Aris and Daniel Lapaine.

The film had its world premiere on 5 August 2021 at the 74th Locarno Film Festival, where it won the Golden Leopard for Best First Film. It was released in cinemas in the United Kingdom on 22 July 2022 by Vertigo Releasing.

== Plot ==
Veronica Ghent, a former film star, goes to a healing retreat in Scotland with her nurse Desi Hatoum after a double mastectomy. The place where she stays is the site where women were burnt as witches centuries before. Their ashes fill the land and give her the power to exact revenge within her dreams.

The film draws on the experiences of women in the film industry in the MeToo era, where Veronica was abused as a child by a powerful director who when challenged by her adult self refers to her as his "special girl", gaslighting her and minimising her experiences.

== Cast ==
- Alice Krige as Veronica Ghent
  - Layla Burns as young Veronica
- Kota Eberhardt as Desi Hatoum
- Malcolm McDowell as Hathbourne
- John McCrea as Ansel
- Rupert Everett as Tirador
- Amy Manson as Lois
- Jonathan Aris as Podrick Lochran
- Jack Greenlees as Owen
- Daniel Lapaine as Keith
- Olwen Fouéré as Jean
- Joanna Bacon as Audrey
- Kenneth Collard as Derek
- Stephen Kyem as Connor
- Fiz Marcus as Joy
- Catriona McNicoll as Janet
- Renee Williams as Ileen
- Apple Yang as Azumi

== Filming ==
She Will was shot in Aviemore and Glasgow, Scotland.

== Release ==
She Will won a Golden Leopard for Best First Film at Locarno Film Festival, while producer Jessica Malik was nominated for Breakthrough Producer at the British Independent Film Awards 2021 following the film's UK premiere in official selection at the BFI London Film Festival.

The film was released in select cinemas and on demand in the United States on 15 July 2022 by IFC Midnight, followed by its release on Shudder on 14 October. It was released in cinemas in the United Kingdom on 22 July 2022 by Vertigo Releasing.

== Reception ==
On the review aggregator website Rotten Tomatoes, the film has an approval rating of 85% based on 67 reviews, with an average rating of 6.8/10. The website's critics consensus reads: "More unsettling than truly scary, She Will casts a thoughtful, hypnotic spell made even stronger by its restrained approach and some strong performances." Metacritic, which uses a weighted average, assigned the film a score of 73 out of 100, based on 18 critics, indicating "generally favorable reviews".

Jessica Kiang of Variety described the film as "a superb, sly horror-drama debut delivering otherworldly feminist vengeance", adding that it "administers a potent dose of #MeToo vengeance, all while wearing its nasty sense of humor like a red-lipstick grin applied to a perfectly masklike face". Fionnuala Halligan of Screen Daily wrote that "Colbert is nothing if not defiant, and determined. Others have been here before her, but she's found a new way in."

Meagan Navarro of Bloody Disgusting wrote, "Between the haunting score and Colbert's effortless style, She Will eschews a conventional narrative and instead casts an atmospheric spell through tactile, dreamy visuals." Director Alfonso Cuarón has said that the film "sits in the tradition of great psychological horror films [which] leaves one questioning long after [it] is finished."

Leslie Felperin of The Guardian referred to it as "a tangy blend of folk horror and post-MeToo reckoning with a salty spike of satire."
