= Habitat (film) =

- Directed by: Rene Daalder
- Written by: Rene Daalder
- Produced by: Peter Kroonenburg; Claude Léger
- Starring: Balthazar Getty; Tchéky Karyo; Alice Krige; Kenneth Welsh; Laura Harris
- Cinematography: Jean Lépine
- Edited by: Gaétan Huot
- Music by: Ralph Grierson
- Production companies: August Entertainment; Ecotopia; Kingsborough Pictures; Largo Entertainment; Transfilm
- Distributed by: A-Pix Entertainment (USA); Behaviour Communications (Canada)
- Release date: April 19, 1997
- Running time: 103 minutes
- Countries: Canada; Netherlands
- Language: English

Habitat is a 1997 science fiction film produced for the direct-to-video market and shown on the Sci Fi Channel. The film's message is largely one of ecological warning, mixed with science fiction elements of genetic engineering, family angst and redemption. It is the only theatrical movie filmed in Sony's early analog High Definition format. Sony donated the equipment and technical support in an attempt to popularize the format. The High Definition video was then transferred to film for release. The film won a Global Film Critics Award for Best Cinematography.

== Plot ==
In a future where the Earth's ozone layer is severely decreased in size, the Symes family is on the run from the father's former employers and the government. Hank Symes a molecular biologist, has become so obsessed with saving the world that he has placed his entire family's lives in danger. They stop in a desert community to hide out and continue work when a terrible accident occurs that transforms Hank into a fantastic ethereal lifeform and begins changing the house into a huge botanical biosphere entity which has the ability to threaten all who enter.

Their son Andreas, however, is experiencing things from a teenager's point of view and doesn't know how he will be able to attend the local school, let alone fit in with any of the local kids as they all see him as some weirdo that just wandered into town. No matter what Andreas feels, his father is still around him, changing things for him and others and eventually even Andreas will come to see that in this strange time he is living that miracles still can happen.

== Cast ==
- Balthazar Getty as Andreas Symes
- Tchéky Karyo as Hank Symes
- Alice Krige as Clarissa Symes
- Kenneth Welsh as Coach Marlowe
- Laura Harris as Deborah Marlowe
- Brad Austin as Blaine
- Christopher Heyerdahl as Eric Thornton (credited as Chris Heyerdahl)
- Kris Holden-Ried as Daryl (credited as Kris Holdenried)
- Daniel Pilon as Strickland
