= Echoes of the Past =

- Echoes of the Past Film Poster
- Directed by: Nicholas Dimitropoulos
- Written by: Dimitrios Katsantonis
- Produced by: Stelios Kotionis; Dimitrios Katsantonis
- Starring: Max von Sydow; Astrid Roos; Danae Skiadi; Nikolas Papagiannis; Martin Laer; Alice Krige; Tomas Arana; Yorgo Voyagis; Maximos Livieratos
- Cinematography: Yorgos Rahmatoulin
- Edited by: Giannis Halkiadakis
- Music by: Alexandros Sidiropoulos
- Production company: Foss Productions
- Distributed by: Tanweer Productions; House of Film
- Release date: November 11, 2021
- Running time: 99 minutes
- Country: Greece
- Languages: English; Greek

Echoes of the Past (also titled Kalavryta 1943) is a 2021 Greek fiction drama directed by Nicholas Dimitropoulos, written by Dimitrios Katsantonis, and starring Max von Sydow in his final film role. The film is inspired by the infamous 'Massacre of Kalavryta' named after the homonymous Greek village invaded by Nazi troops in 1943. Caroline Martin, a lawyer representing Germany's government on Greek reparations claims, visits Greece and meets one of the remaining survivors of the massacre Nikolas Andreou. As Nikolas recounts the events of the past, all their personal prejudices and beliefs that meant to keep divided will bring them together. Their cathartic journey through this dark chapter of history reflects their shared need for gaining hope again.

== Cast ==
- Max von Sydow as Nikolas Andreou
- Astrid Roos as Caroline Martin
- Danae Skiadi as Maria Andreou
- Nikolas Papagiannis as Alexis Andreou
- Martin Laer as Commandant Tenner
- Alice Krige as Andrea Foss
- Tomas Arana as General von Le Suire
- Yorgo Voyagis as Manolis
- Maximos Livieratos as Nikolas Andreou(young)

== Release ==
Echoes of the Past premiered at the 62nd Thessaloniki Film Festival acquiring positive responses from both critics and the audiences. The film was theatrically premiered in Greece on November 8, 2021, at Stavros Niarchos Foundation Cultural Center and released to the cinemas on November 11, 2021. Despite the COVID-19 pandemic the film had a strong box office run with 40,000 tickets sold within the first two weeks of its theatrical premiere. The film is also available across several VOD and digital platforms, including Amazon Prime and Google TV. The film made its North American debut during the Greek International Film Festival Tour of Canada in October 2022. Also, in October 2022, Echoes of the Past, premiered in Australia at the Greek Film Festival- Australia.

== Reception ==
=== Accolades ===
Echoes of the past won the Youth Jury Award for Best Film at the 62nd Thessaloniki Film Festival. The jury noted that they "believe that the spark of this movie is necessary to turn into a flame both in our country and abroad, so that its clear - at least to us - message becomes evident to everyone: zero tolerance to fascism". The movie has also acquired four nominations at the Hellenic Film Academy Awards.Echoes of the Past won the Best Feature Film Award during the GIFFT 2022.

=== Critical response ===
Cara McWilliam-Richardson, reviewing for the people's movies, stated that "Echoes of the Past is a thought provoking and watchable drama with a powerful performance from Von Sydow." Jon Donnis, writing for the beentothemovies.com, exclaimed that Echoes of the past is "A truly powerful film, that anyone with an interest in history should watch." On FilmHounds, Mark Goodyear, said that "Dimitropoulos does all his best work as he highlights the men and women of Kalavryta dealing with the toughest things anyone can ever face." On film-forums.com, Ben Kelly and Richard Williams stated that the film is "A thoroughly impressive work which manages to be a testament to both the subject matter and the star now lost to us." highlighting "Sydow’s flawless final performance".

However, a lot of controversy emerged after the release of the film regarding the dramatization of the facts surrounding the historical event of Kalavryta. In an interview with Variety, director Nicholas Dimitropoulos noted that "He was inspired to share the tragic story of Kalavryta, which remains little-known outside of Greece, to teach audiences about a dark chapter in Europe’s recent past at a time when fascism around the world is on the rise."

Peter Bradshaw of The Guardian awarded the film two stars out of five, calling it an "odd, stilted and contrived movie..."

Kevin Maher of The Times also awarded the film two stars out of five and wrote, "It’s odd, amateurish and uneven. The subject, and indeed von Sydow, deserved better."
