= Katinka (film) =

1988 film

- Film poster
- Directed by: Max von Sydow
- Written by: Klaus Rifbjerg
- Based on: Ved Vejen by Herman Bang
- Produced by: Bo Christensen; Katinka Faragó
- Starring: Tammi Øst
- Cinematography: Claus Loof; Sven Nykvist
- Edited by: Janus Billeskov Jansen
- Release date: 19 August 1988
- Running time: 96 minutes
- Countries: Denmark; Sweden
- Language: Danish

Katinka (Danish: Ved vejen, Swedish: Vid vägen) is a 1988 Danish-Swedish drama film directed by Max von Sydow and starring Tammi Øst. Based on Herman Bang's novel Ved Vejen (1886) which is included in the Danish Culture Canon, it was screened in the Un Certain Regard section at the 1988 Cannes Film Festival. At the 24th Guldbagge Awards it won the award for Best Film and Von Sydow won the award for Best Director.

== Cast ==
- Tammi Øst as Katinka
- Ole Ernst as Bai
- Kurt Ravn as Wilhelm Huus
- Erik Paaske as Linde
- Anne Grete Hilding as Mrs. Linde
- Tine Miehe-Renard as Agnes
- Ghita Nørby as Helene
- Birthe Backhausen as Mrs. Abel
- Bodil Lassen as Louise Abel
- Vibeke Hastrup as Ida Abel
- Henrik Koefoed as Bentsen
- Kim Harris as Togfører
- Kjeld Nørgaard as Kiær
- Birgitte Bruun as Emma
- Dick Kaysø as Andersen
- Paul Hüttel as Doktor
- Søren Sætter-Lassen as The Lieutenant
