= Max von Sydow =

Swedish and French actor (1929–2020)

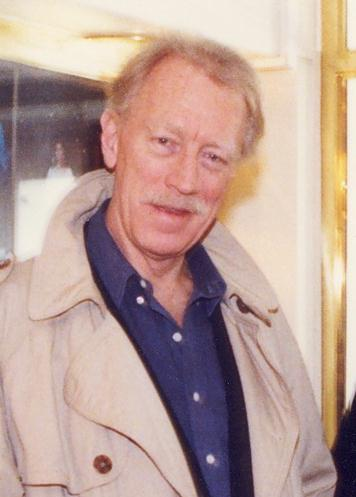
- Von Sydow in 1992
- Born: Carl Adolf von Sydow; 10 April 1929; Lund, Sweden
- Died: 8 March 2020 (aged 90); Seillans, France
- Citizenship: Sweden (until 2002); France (from 2002)
- Education: Royal Dramatic Theatre
- Occupation: Actor
- Years active: 1949–2020
- Spouses: Christina Olin (m. 1951; div. 1979) Catherine Brelet (m. 1997)
- Children: 4
- Father: Carl Wilhelm von Sydow
- Family: Von Sydow
- Awards: Full list

Max von Sydow (Swedish pronunciation: [maks fɔn ˈsyːdɔv]; born Carl Adolf von Sydow; 10 April 1929 – 8 March 2020) was a Swedish and French actor. He had a 70-year career in European and American cinema, television, and theatre, appearing in more than 150 films and several television series in multiple languages. Capable in roles ranging from stolid, contemplative protagonists to sardonic artists and menacing, often gleeful villains, von Sydow received numerous accolades including honors from the Cannes Film Festival and the Venice Film Festival. He was nominated for two Academy Awards: for Best Actor for Pelle the Conqueror (1987) and for Best Supporting Actor for Extremely Loud & Incredibly Close (2011).

Von Sydow was first noticed internationally for playing the 14th-century knight Antonius Block in Ingmar Bergman's The Seventh Seal (1957), which features iconic scenes of his character challenging Death to a game of chess. He appeared in eleven films directed by Bergman, including Wild Strawberries (1957), The Virgin Spring (1960), Through a Glass Darkly (1961), Winter Light (1963), Shame (1968), and The Touch (1971).

Von Sydow made his American film debut as Jesus Christ in the Biblical epic film The Greatest Story Ever Told (1965) and went on to star in films such as Hawaii (1966), The Exorcist (1973), Three Days of the Condor (1975), Flash Gordon (1980), Conan the Barbarian (1982) and the James Bond adaptation Never Say Never Again (1983). He also appeared in supporting roles in Dune (1984), Hannah and Her Sisters (1986), Awakenings (1990), Minority Report (2002), The Diving Bell and the Butterfly (2007), Shutter Island (2010), Robin Hood (2010), and Star Wars: The Force Awakens (2015). He portrayed the main antagonist Leland Gaunt (The Devil) in Needful Things (1993). In 2016, he portrayed Bloodraven in the HBO fantasy series Game of Thrones, for which he was nominated for the Primetime Emmy Award for Outstanding Guest Actor in a Drama Series.

Von Sydow received the Royal Foundation of Sweden's Cultural Award in 1954, was made a Commandeur des Arts et des Lettres in 2005, and was named a Chevalier de la Légion d'honneur on 17 October 2012.

== Early life ==
Carl Adolf von Sydow was born on 10 April 1929 in Lund, Sweden. His father, Carl Wilhelm von Sydow, was an ethnologist and professor of folkloristics at Lund University. His mother, Baroness Maria Margareta Rappe, was a schoolteacher. Sydow was of part-German ancestry. A paternal ancestor, David Sydow ("von" or "Von" was added later to the family name), emigrated from Pomerania to the Kalmar region in 1724. His mother was also of part-Pomeranian descent. Sydow was raised as a Lutheran, but became an agnostic in the 1970s.

Sydow attended Lund Cathedral School, where he learned English at an early age. Originally expected to pursue a career in law, he became interested in acting after seeing a production of A Midsummer Night's Dream during a class trip to Malmö, which prompted him to establish an amateur theatrical group along with his friends back at school.

Sydow served for two years in the Swedish Army with the Army Quartermaster Corps, where he adopted the name "Max" from the star performer of a flea circus he saw. After completing his service, Sydow studied at the Royal Dramatic Theatre in Stockholm where he trained between 1948 and 1951. During his time at the Royal Dramatic Theatre, he helped start a theatre group, of which actress Ingrid Thulin was a member. He made his stage debut in a small part in the Goethe play Egmont, which he considered "almost a disaster," but received good reviews for his performance.

== Career ==
=== Early career ===
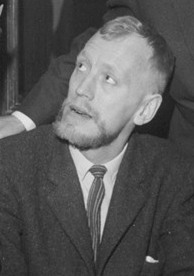
Max von Sydow in 1961

While at the Royal Dramatic Theatre, Sydow made his screen debuts in Alf Sjöberg's films Only a Mother (Bara en mor, 1949) and Miss Julie (Fröken Julie, 1951). In 1951, Sydow joined the Norrköping-Linköping Municipal Theatre, appearing in nine plays including Peer Gynt. In 1953, he moved on to the City Theatre in Hälsingborg (Helsingborg), playing eleven parts in a two-year stint, including Prospero in The Tempest and the title role of the Pirandello play Henry IV. Sydow's theatrical work won him critical recognition, and in 1954 he received the Royal Foundation of Sweden's Cultural Award, a grant to young, promising actors.

=== 1955–1960s ===
In 1955, Sydow moved to Malmö and joined the Malmö City Theatre, whose chief director at the time was Ingmar Bergman. Sydow had previously sought to play a small part in Bergman's Prison (Fängelse, 1949), but the director rejected the proposition. Bergman and Sydow's first film was The Seventh Seal (Det sjunde inseglet, 1957), in which Sydow portrayed Antonius Block, a disillusioned 14th-century knight returning from the Crusades to a plague-stricken Sweden. The scene of his character playing a game of chess with Death has come to be regarded as an iconic moment in cinema.

Sydow appeared in 11 Bergman films. In The Magician (Ansiktet, 1958), Sydow starred as Vogler, a 19th-century traveling illusionist who remains silent for most of the film. In The Virgin Spring (Jungfrukällan, 1960), he played a medieval landowner who takes vengeance on the men who raped and murdered his daughter. In Through a Glass Darkly (Såsom i en spegel, 1961), he portrayed the husband of a schizophrenic woman, played by Harriet Andersson.

During this period, he also had roles in films including Wild Strawberries (Smultronstället, 1957), Brink of Life (Nära livet, 1958) and Winter Light (Nattvardsgästerna, 1963). Films starring Sydow were submitted by Sweden for the Academy Award for Best Foreign Language Film in five out of six years between 1957 and 1962. Under Bergman, Sydow also continued his stage career, playing Brick in Cat on a Hot Tin Roof, Peer in Peer Gynt, Alceste in The Misanthrope and Faust in Urfaust. In his company were Gunnar Björnstrand, Ingrid Thulin, Bibi Andersson and Gunnel Lindblom, all frequent collaborators of Bergman on screen.

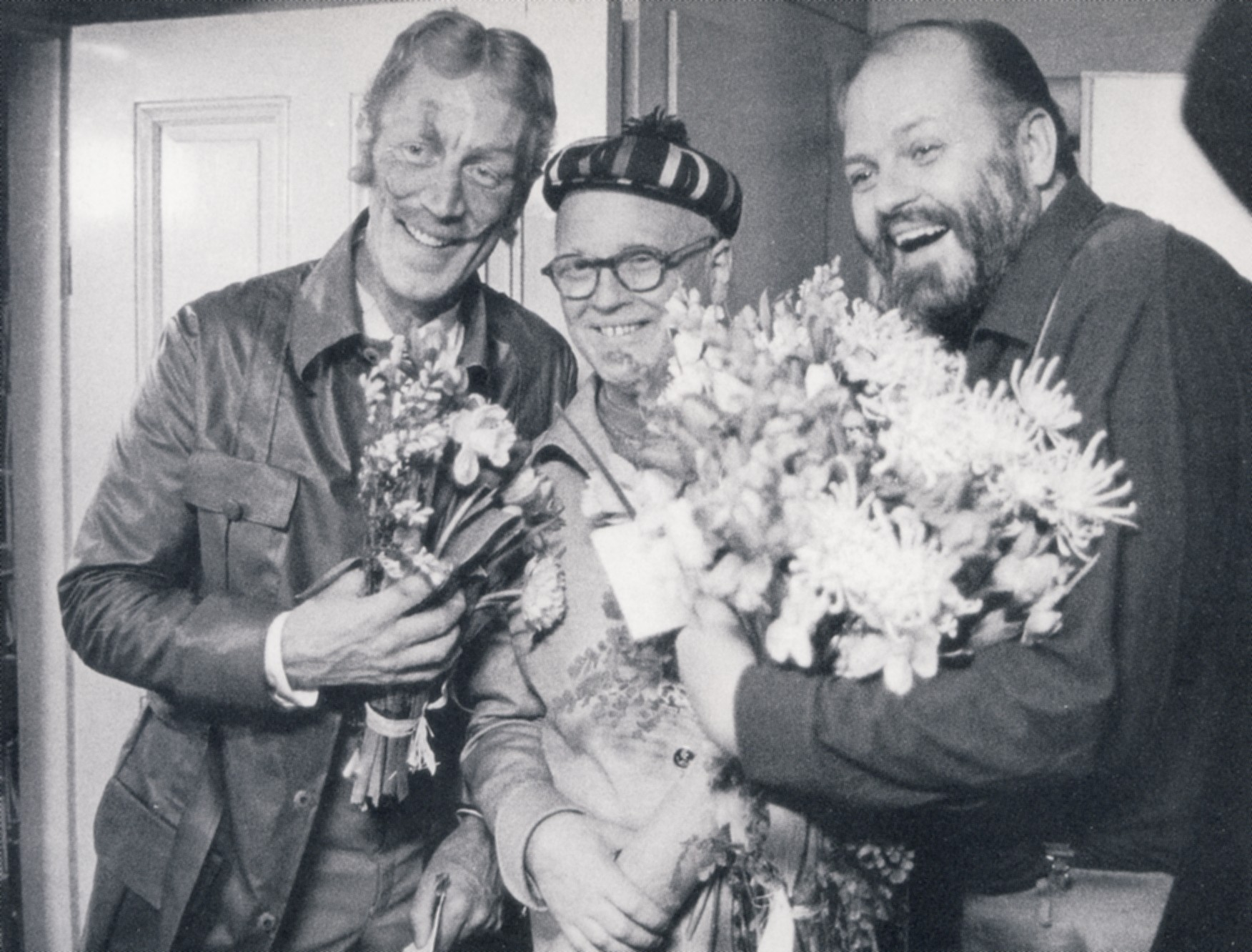
Max von Sydow (left) with Povel Ramel and Beppe Wolgers, 1968

Despite his rising profile, Sydow limited his work exclusively to Sweden early in his career, constantly refusing offers to work outside the country. He was first approached at the 1959 Cannes Film Festival to act in U.S. films, but refused the proposition, saying that he was "content in Sweden" and "had no intention of starting an international career". He also refused the opportunity to play the title role for Dr. No (1962) and Captain von Trapp in The Sound of Music (1965).

In 1965, Sydow accepted George Stevens's offer and made his international debut, playing Christ in the epic The Greatest Story Ever Told. He accepted the part against the advice of Bergman, spent six months at the University of California, Los Angeles, preparing for the role, and adopted a Mid-Atlantic accent. The film introduced Sydow to a wider audience, but ultimately performed below expectations at the box office. He played a crop-dusting pilot in The Reward (1965) and a fanatic missionary in Hawaii (1966). For his performance in Hawaii, Sydow received his first Golden Globe nomination.

To his frustration, Sydow was frequently cast in villainous roles, such as a neo-Nazi aristocrat in The Quiller Memorandum (1966), a Russian colonel in The Kremlin Letter (1970), a meticulous and elegant international assassin in Three Days of the Condor (1975), Emperor Ming the Merciless in Flash Gordon (1980) and James Bond's nemesis Ernst Stavro Blofeld in Never Say Never Again (1983).

In the late 1960s and early 1970s, Sydow was often paired with Liv Ullmann in Bergman films. In 1968's Hour of the Wolf (Vargtimmen), Sydow played an artist living on an isolated island with his pregnant wife, played by Ullmann. In the same year, the two appeared in the drama Shame (Skammen), about a couple, both former musicians, living on a farm on an island during a war. Sydow and Ullmann returned for the 1969 Bergman film The Passion of Anna (En passion). In 1971 and 1972, Sydow again starred alongside Ullmann in the Jan Troell epic duology, The Emigrants (Utvandrarna) The New Land (Nybyggarna), the story of a Swedish peasant family that emigrates to America in the mid-19th century.

=== 1970s–1980s ===
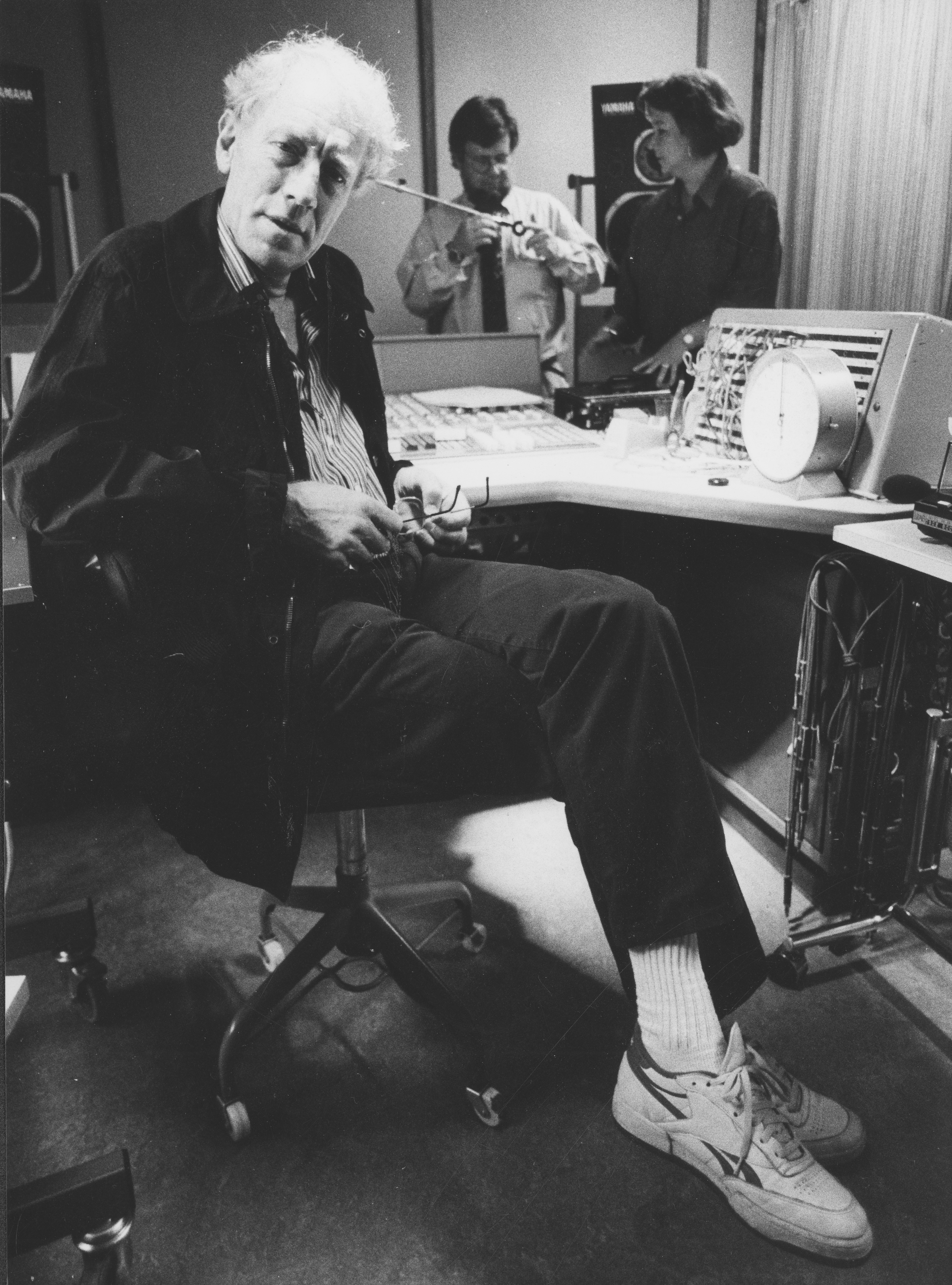
Max von Sydow in Lund, Sweden, 1989.

In 1971, Sydow starred in The Touch, Bergman's first English-language film, playing a doctor whose wife is having an affair. In 1973, Sydow appeared in one of his most commercially successful films, William Friedkin's The Exorcist (1973). He played Father Lankester Merrin, the film's titular Jesuit priest, which earned him his second Golden Globe nomination. He reprised the role in the film's sequel, Exorcist II: The Heretic (1977).

In 1977, Sydow made his Broadway debut alongside Eileen Atkins and Bibi Andersson in Per Olov Enquist's The Night of the Tribades, a play about the writer August Strindberg. In 1981, he starred with Anne Bancroft in the Tom Kempinski play Duet for One about a famous violinist with multiple sclerosis. Sydow made his British stage debut at The Old Vic in 1988 as Prospero in The Tempest, a role he had first played in Sweden three decades before.

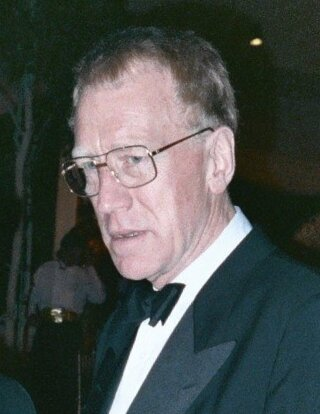
Von Sydow at the 61st Academy Awards, 1989

In the 1980s, he portrayed two supervillains: Ming the Merciless in 1980's Flash Gordon and Ernst Stavro Blofeld in the 1983 James Bond film Never Say Never Again. Sydow also appeared in John Milius' Conan the Barbarian (1982), Jan Troell's Flight of the Eagle (1982), Rick Moranis' and Dave Thomas' Strange Brew (1983), David Lynch's Dune (1984) and Woody Allen's Hannah and Her Sisters (1986). In 1985, Sydow was a member of the jury at the 35th Berlin International Film Festival.

In the 1987 Bille August film Pelle the Conqueror, Sydow portrayed an impoverished Swedish labourer who brings his son to Denmark to try to build a better life for themselves. The role won him international acclaim and is often considered one of the best roles in his career. For his performance, Sydow received a Best Actor nomination at the 61st Academy Awards; the film won Best Foreign Language Film as Denmark's official Oscar entry.

In 1988, Sydow made his only directorial foray with Katinka, a film based on the Herman Bang novel, Ved Vejen. The film won the Guldbagge Awards for Best Film and Best Director but was not widely seen outside Sweden. In 1989, Sydow appeared in the television film Red King, White Knight, for which he received his first Primetime Emmy Award nomination. He also supplied the voice for Vigo the Carpathian in the 1989 film, Ghostbusters II.

=== 1990s–2000s ===
Sydow and Bergman did not work together for an extended period. A part in Bergman's Fanny and Alexander (1982) was specifically written for Sydow, but his agent demanded too large a salary. Sydow came to regret missing out on the role. The two reunited in 1991 with The Best Intentions, directed by Bille August with a script from Bergman. In 1996, Sydow made his final appearance in a Bergman film, Private Confessions, directed by Liv Ullmann and written by Bergman. He also worked with August again on George Lucas' TV series The Young Indiana Jones Chronicles in the later retitled 1993 episode "The Perils of Cupid".

In 1997, Sydow played Nobel Prize-winning Norwegian novelist and Nazi sympathizer Knut Hamsun in the biopic Hamsun. Throughout the rest of the 1990s, Sydow also appeared in films such as Father (1990), Awakenings (1990), Until the End of the World (1991), Needful Things (1993), Judge Dredd (1995) and Snow Falling on Cedars (1999). For his performance in Father, Sydow won the Australian Film Institute Best Actor Award.

In 2002, Sydow acted in one of his biggest commercial successes, playing the PreCrime director opposite Tom Cruise in Steven Spielberg's science fiction thriller Minority Report. In 2004, Sydow appeared in a television adaptation of the Ring of the Nibelung saga. The show set ratings records and was later released in the United States as Dark Kingdom: The Dragon King. In 2007, he starred in the box-office hit Rush Hour 3 as one of the antagonists opposite Jackie Chan and Chris Tucker, and played the father of the protagonist in The Diving Bell and the Butterfly, Julian Schnabel's adaptation of the memoir by Jean-Dominique Bauby. In 2009, Sydow appeared in the drama series The Tudors.

=== 2010s ===
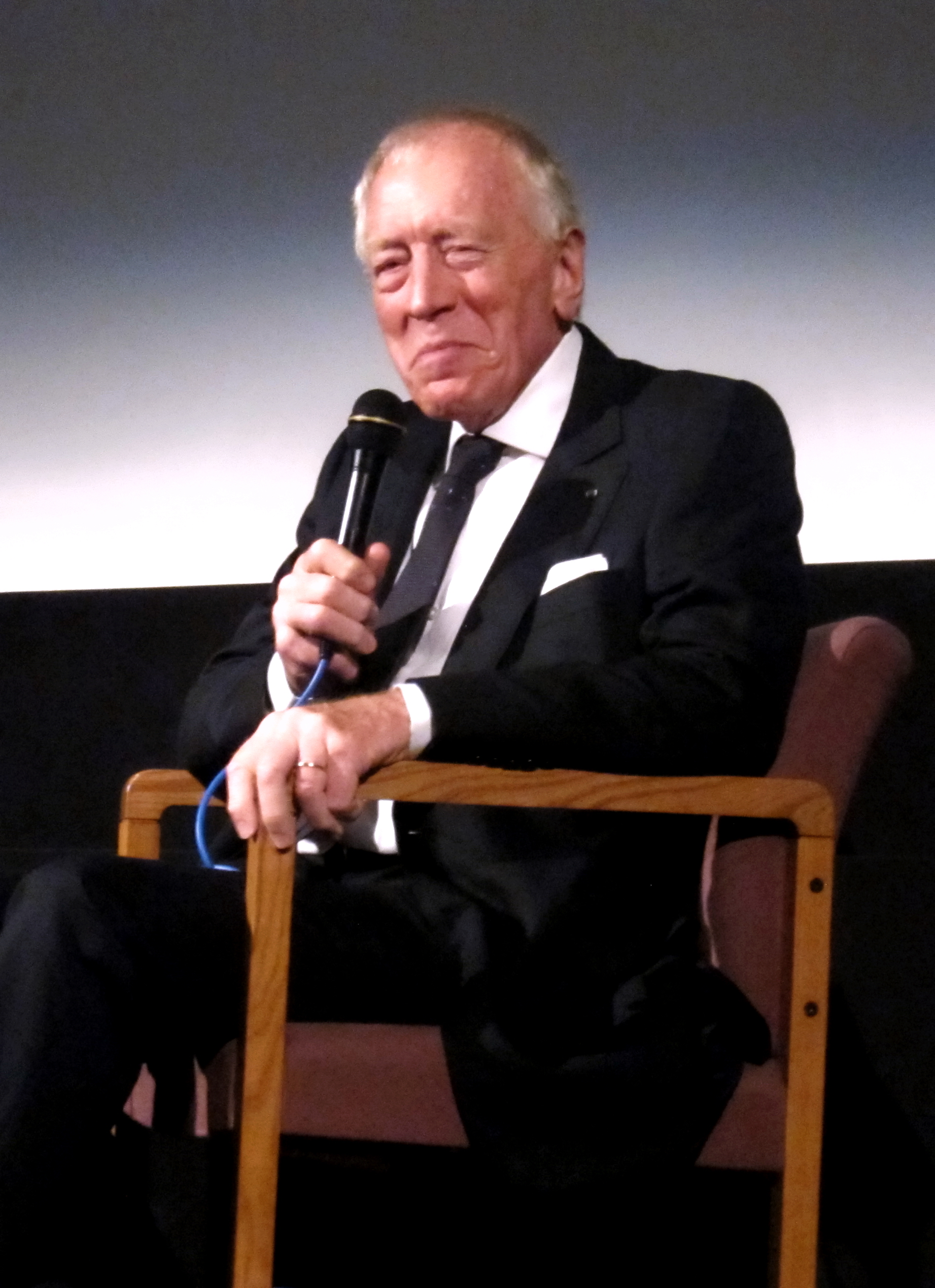
Von Sydow in 2012

In 2010, Sydow played a sinister German doctor in Martin Scorsese's Shutter Island, and Robin Hood's blind stepfather Sir Walter Loxley in Ridley Scott's Robin Hood. He received his second Academy Award nomination for his performance as a mute elderly renter in Stephen Daldry's Extremely Loud & Incredibly Close (2011), based on the novel by Jonathan Safran Foer.

In April 2013, Sydow was honored at the Turner Classic Movie (TCM) Festival in Hollywood, with screenings of two of his best-known films, Three Days of the Condor and The Seventh Seal.

In March 2014, Sydow provided the voice of an art forger in "The War of Art", an episode of The Simpsons.

In 2015, he played the explorer Lor San Tekka in Star Wars: The Force Awakens. In 2016, he joined the HBO series Game of Thrones as the Three-eyed Raven. For his performance, Sydow received his second Primetime Emmy Award nomination.

Sydow made forays into video games. He voiced Esbern, a mentor of the protagonist in The Elder Scrolls V: Skyrim (2011), and narrated the game's debut trailer. He lent his voice to the 2009 game Ghostbusters: The Video Game and reprised his role as Lor San Tekka in Lego Star Wars: The Force Awakens (2016).

In 2018, Sydow appeared in Thomas Vinterberg's film Kursk, also known as The Command, based on the true story of the Kursk submarine disaster.

His final role was in Nicholas Dimitropoulos's war drama Echoes of the Past (2021). He portrayed Nicolas Andreou, one of the last living survivors of the Kalavryta massacre of 1943 committed by Nazi troops during the Axis occupation of Greece.

== Personal life and death ==
Max von Sydow married actress Christina Inga Britta Olin in 1951. They had two sons. The couple divorced in 1979. Von Sydow in 1997 married Catherine Brelet, French director of a featurette for Sleepless (2001) (and director of the association Maison des métiers d'art français), and adopted Brelet's two adult sons from her previous marriage.

Sydow moved to Paris following his marriage to Brelet. In 2002, he became a citizen of France, at which time he had to relinquish his Swedish citizenship. Sydow was reported to be either an agnostic or an atheist. In 2012, he told Charlie Rose in an interview that Ingmar Bergman had told him he would contact him after death to show him that there was a life after death. When Rose asked Sydow if he had heard from Bergman, he replied that he had but chose not to elaborate further on the meaning of this statement. In the same interview, he described himself as a doubter in his youth but stated this doubt was gone and indicated he came to agree with Bergman's belief in the afterlife.

Max von Sydow died on 8 March 2020 at his home in Provence, France, at age 90, a month before his 91st birthday.

== Awards and nominations ==
He was nominated for two Academy Awards, for his performances in Bille August's Pelle the Conqueror (1987) and Stephen Daldry's Extremely Loud & Incredibly Close (2011). At the age of 82, von Sydow was one of the oldest Oscar acting nominees. He received two Golden Globe Awards nominations and two Primetime Emmy Awards nominations.

In 1982, he received the Best Actor prize at the Venice International Film Festival for his performance in Flight of the Eagle. He was the winner of 3 Guldbagge Awards and received a festival trophy from the Cannes Film Festival in 2004.

== See also ==
- List of actors with two or more Academy Award nominations in acting categories
- List of oldest and youngest Academy Award winners and nominees
- List of Academy Award records – first Nordic actor to be nominated for acting, for Pelle the Conqueror (1988)
- List of actors nominated for Academy Awards for non-English performances
