= Det Schubotheske Forlag =

Det Schubotheske Forlag was a Danish publishing house. It was founded in 1728 by Frantz Christian Mumme. It was disestablished in 1909. Some of the publications were written in Icelandic or Old Norse.
