= Herman Bang =

Danish journalist and author (1857–1912)

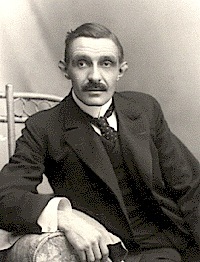
- Born: 20 April 1857; Asserballe, Schleswig
- Died: 29 January 1912 (aged 54); Ogden, Utah
- Resting place: Vestre Cemetery (Copenhagen)
- Occupation: Writer

Herman Joachim Bang (20 April 1857 – 29 January 1912) was a Danish journalist and author, one of the men of the Modern Breakthrough.

== Biography ==
=== Early life and education ===
Bang was born in Asserballe, on the small Danish island of Als, the son of vicar Frederik Ludvig Bang (1816–75) and Thora Elisabeth Salomine Blach (1829–71). His paternal grandfather was the medical doctor Ole Bang. He was also related to N. F. S. Grundtvig. His family history was marked by insanity and disease.

During the Second Schleswig War, Bang moved with his family to Horsens. His father was later appointed as pastor of Tersløse, on Zealand. His mother died in 1871. His father was hit by mental disease and died just four years later. Bang matriculated from Sorø Academy in 1875 and earned his Cand. Phil. degree from the University of Copenhagen in 1877. He spent his first student years living with his grandfather, Old Bang, whom he later described in the novel Det graa hus. He began to study law but gave up his studies with aspirations to become an actor.

=== Writing career ===
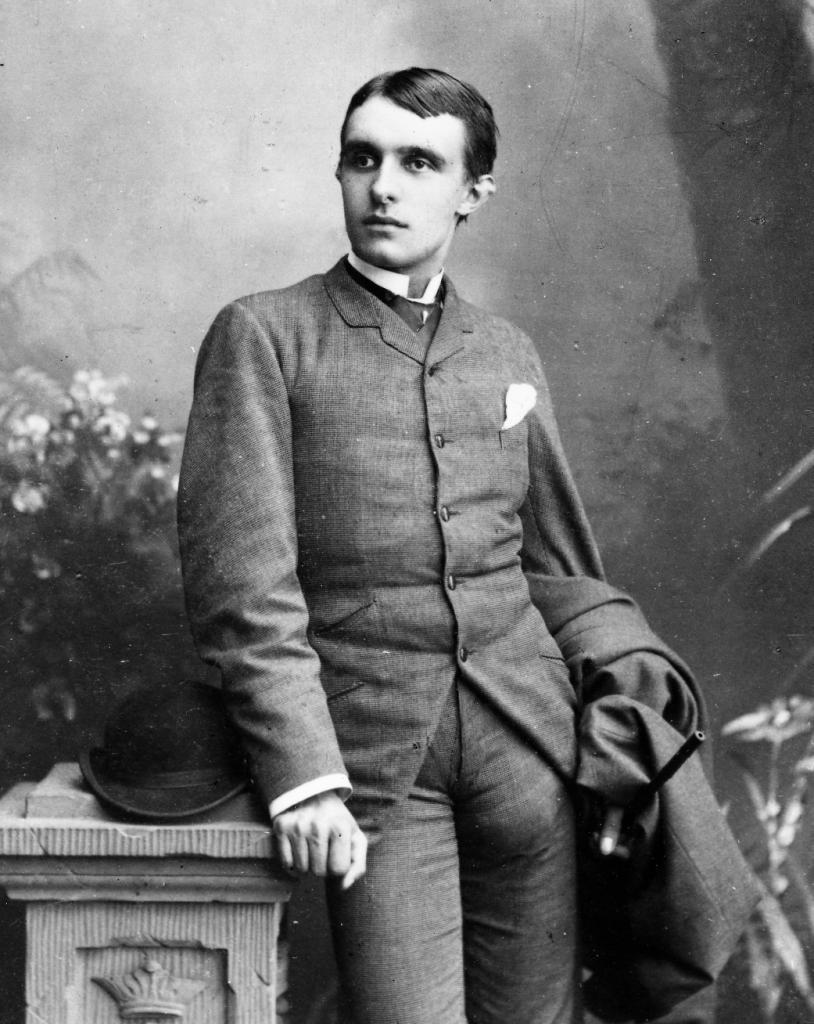
Herman Bang c. 1880

When he was twenty he published two volumes of critical essays on the realistic movement. In 1880 he published his novel Haabløse Slægter (Families Without Hope), which aroused immediate attention. The main character was a young man who had a relationship with an older woman. The book was considered obscene at the time and was banned. After some time spent in travel and a successful lecture tour of Norway and Sweden, he settled in Copenhagen and produced a series of novels and collections of short stories which placed him in the front rank of Scandinavian novelists. Among his more famous stories are "Fædra" (1883) and "Tine" ("Tina", 1889).

The latter won for its author the friendship of Henrik Ibsen and the enthusiastic admiration of Jonas Lie. Among his other works are Det hvide Hus (The White House, 1898), Excentriske Noveller (Eccentric Stories, 1885), Stille Eksistenser (Quiet Existences, 1886), Liv og Død (Life and Death, 1899), Englen Michael (The Angel Michael, 1902), a volume of poems (1889), and recollections, Ti Aar (Ten Years, 1891).

Bang was homosexual, a fact which contributed to his isolation in the Cultural life of Denmark and made him the victim of smear campaigns. He lived most of his life with his sister, but spent a few years living in Prague in 1885–86, with the German actor Max Eisfeld (1863–1935). Uninterested in politics, he was distant from most of his colleagues in the naturalist movement.

After a failed attempt as an actor, Bang earned fame as a theatre producer in Paris and in Copenhagen. He was a productive journalist, writing for Danish, Nordic and German newspapers, developing modern reporting. His article on the fire at Christiansborg Palace is considered a landmark in Danish journalism.

Bang's works earned him renown as a leading European impressionist writer. Bang's last years were embittered by persecutions and declining health. He traveled widely in Europe, and during a lecture tour of the United States he was taken ill on the train and died in Ogden, Utah.

== Themes ==
Bang is primarily concerned with "quiet existences", the disregarded and ignored people living boring and apparently unimportant lives. He is especially interested in describing lonely or isolated women. Ved Vejen (Katinka, 1886) describes the secret and never fulfilled passion of a young wife of a stationmaster, living in a barren marriage. Tine (1889), which has the war with Prussia in 1864 (the Second War of Schleswig) as background, tells the tragic love story of a young girl on the island of Als. Stuk (Stucco, 1887) recounts a young man's love affair that is fading away without any real explanation, against the background of the "Gründerzeit" of Copenhagen and its superficial modernization and economic speculation. In Ludvigsbakke (1896) a young nurse squanders her love on a spineless childhood friend, who eventually deserts her, in order to save his estate by marrying a rich heiress. Some of his books, including Tina and Katinka (English titles), have been translated into many languages and filmed. Bang's 1902 novel Mikaël, based on the life of Auguste Rodin, proved especially popular for adaptations in the silent era, having been made into two films: 1916's The Wings, directed by Mauritz Stiller, and 1924's Michael, directed by Carl Theodor Dreyer. Another notable film adaptation is the 1928 Four Devils by Friedrich Wilhelm Murnau.
