= Red King, White Knight =

1989 television film directed by Geoff Murphy

- Written by: Ron Hutchinson
- Directed by: Geoff Murphy
- Starring: Tom Skerritt; Max von Sydow; Helen Mirren
- Composer: John Scott
- Country of origin: United States
- Original language: English

Production
- Executive producer: David R. Ginsburg
- Producer: John Kemeny
- Production locations: Budapest, Hungary; Washington, D.C., United States
- Cinematography: Elemér Ragályi
- Editor: Peter Davies
- Running time: 105 minutes
- Production companies: Zenith Entertainment; Citadel Entertainment

Original release
- Network: HBO
- Release: November 25, 1989

Red King, White Knight is a 1989 American political thriller television film directed by Geoff Murphy and written by Ron Hutchinson. The film stars Tom Skerritt as Bill Stoner, a retired CIA operative who is sent to eastern Europe to determine the truth of a KGB plot to assassinate Soviet leader Mikhail Gorbachev. It also stars Helen Mirren as Stoner's former girlfriend Anna, Max von Sydow as his old retired KGB adversary Szaz, and Tom Bell as the KGB plot organiser Tulayev.

At the 42nd Primetime Emmy Awards, von Sydow was nominated for Outstanding Supporting Actor in a Miniseries or a Special for his role in the film.

== Plot ==
The CIA is informed of an IRA assassin being hired by the KGB to kill the reformist Soviet General Secretary and enlists Stoner, an agent retired for several years, to go to the Soviet satellite state and check the reliability of Vlasek, the plot informant. Stoner, an ex-alcoholic with financial troubles, is not told of the assassination plot but agrees to go despite grieving the suicide of his wife there 10 years earlier.

Stoner only learns of the plot and runs into difficulty when Vlasek is killed trying to leave the country with him. He stays to verify the plot but his problems are then complicated by the renewal of an affair with Anna, a Russian he knew 10 years earlier, as he shelters with her and tries to convince her to defect. In the meantime, a committee of U.S. policymakers struggle over whether or not to inform the Soviet leadership about the KGB's plan, and the plot leader Tulayev enlists retired KGB agent Szaz to identify and hunt down Stoner.

== Cast ==
- Tom Skerritt as Stoner
- Max von Sydow as Szaz
- Helen Mirren as Anna
- Tom Bell as Tulayev
- Neil Dudgeon as Vlasek
- Gavan O'Herlihy as Clancy
- Barry Corbin as Bentick
- Clarke Peters as Jones
- Kerry Shale as Viktor
- Lou Hirsch as Baetz
- Phil Arthurs as Mikhail Gorbachev

== Release ==
Red King, White Knight premiered on HBO on November 25, 1989.
