= List of Nashville cast members =

Nashville is an American musical drama television series. It was created by Academy Award winner Callie Khouri and produced by R. J. Cutler, Khouri, Steve Buchanan, Marshall Herskovitz, and Edward Zwick. The series stars Connie Britton as Rayna Jaymes, a legendary country music superstar whose stardom has begun to fade, and Hayden Panettiere as a rising younger star, Juliette Barnes. This is a list of cast members, as well as recurring and guest stars. A number of country musicians and celebrities also appear as themselves, including Brad Paisley, Conan O'Brien, Katie Couric, Kelly Clarkson, Luke Bryan, Maria Menounos and Michelle Obama.

The cast of Nashville, for the first half of season five

The cast of Nashville, for the second half of season five

== Cast ==
=== Regular ===
Actor	Character	First episode	Final episode	Seasons					
Actor	Character	First episode	Final episode	1	2	3	4	5	6
Connie Britton	Rayna Jaymes	1.01	6.16	Main	Main	Main	Main	Main (Note: Britton was only credited in the main cast for episodes 5x01 to 5x11.)	Guest
Hayden Panettiere	Juliette Barnes	1.01	6.16	Main	Main	Main	Main	Main	Main
Clare Bowen	Scarlett O'Connor	1.01	6.16	Main	Main	Main	Main	Main	Main
Eric Close	Teddy Conrad	1.01	6.16	Main	Main	Main	Guest	Guest	Guest
Charles Esten	Deacon Claybourne	1.01	6.16	Main	Main	Main	Main	Main	Main
Jonathan Jackson	Avery Barkley	1.01	6.16	Main	Main	Main	Main	Main	Main
Sam Palladio	Gunnar Scott	1.01	6.16	Main	Main	Main	Main	Main	Main
Robert Wisdom	Coleman Carlisle	1.01	2.03	Main	Guest				
Powers Boothe	Lamar Wyatt	1.01	2.14	Main	Recurring				
Chris Carmack	Will Lexington	1.16	6.16	Recurring	Main	Main	Main	Main	Main
Lennon Stella	Maddie Conrad	1.01	6.16	Recurring	Main	Main	Main	Main	Main
Maisy Stella	Daphne Conrad	1.01	6.16	Recurring	Main	Main	Main	Main	Main
Will Chase	Luke Wheeler	2.05	6.16		Recurring	Main	Main	Guest	Guest
Oliver Hudson	Jeff Fordham	2.02	4.06		Recurring	Main	Recurring		
Aubrey Peeples	Layla Grant	2.02	4.21		Recurring	Recurring	Main		
Cameron Scoggins	Zach Welles	5.01	6.16					Main (Note: Scoggins recurred from 5x01 through 5x13 before being credited in the main cast from 5x14.)	Recurring
Kaitlin Doubleday	Jessie Caine	5.14	6.16					Main (Note: Doubleday was credited in the main cast from 5x14.)	Main
Jeff Nordling	Brad Maitland	5.16	6.16					Recurring	Main (Note: Nordling was credited in the main cast from 6x06.)

=== Recurring ===
Actor	Character	First episode	Final episode	Seasons					
Actor	Character	First episode	Final episode	1	2	3	4	5	6
Judith Hoag	Tandy Hampton	1.01	6.16	Recurring	Recurring	Guest	Guest	Guest	Guest
Sylvia Jefferies	Jolene Barnes	1.01	6.16	Recurring		Guest		Guest	Guest
JD Souther	Watty White	1.01	5.10	Recurring				Guest	
Ed Amatrudo	Glenn Goodman	1.01	6.16	Recurring	Recurring	Recurring	Recurring	Recurring	Recurring
David Alford	Bucky Dawes	1.01	6.16	Recurring	Recurring	Recurring	Recurring	Recurring	Recurring
Kourtney Hansen	Emily	1.01	6.16	Recurring	Recurring	Recurring	Recurring	Recurring	Recurring
Melvin Kearney	Bo	1.01	6.16	Recurring	Recurring	Recurring	Recurring	Guest	Guest
J. Karen Thomas	Audrey Carlisle	1.01	1.19	Recurring					
Kimberly Williams-Paisley	Peggy Kenter	1.04	2.10	Recurring	Recurring				
Michiel Huisman	Liam McGuinnis	1.06	2.16	Recurring	Recurring				
Rya Kihlstedt	Marilyn Rhodes	1.06	1.16	Recurring					
Chloe Bennet	Hailey	1.04	1.16	Recurring					
Tilky Jones	Sean Butler	1.05	1.10	Recurring					
Wyclef Jean	Dominic King	1.07	1.15	Recurring					
Jay Hernandez	Dante Rivas	1.14	1.20	Recurring					
Susan Misner	Stacy	1.15	1.19	Recurring					
Derek Krantz	Brent McKinney	1.21	2.17	Guest	Recurring				
Christina Chang	Megan Vannoy	2.01	2.18		Recurring				
Chaley Rose	Zoey Dalton	2.01	4.04		Recurring	Recurring	Guest		
Charlie Bewley	Charles Wentworth	2.03	2.19		Recurring				
Keean Johnson	Colt Wheeler	2.18	6.16		Guest	Recurring	Recurring		Guest
Laura Benanti	Sadie Stone	3.02	3.17			Recurring			
Brette Taylor	Pam York	3.03	3.07			Recurring			
Alexa PenaVega	Kiley	3.03	3.22			Recurring			
Moniqua Plante	Natasha	3.06	3.19			Recurring			
Derek Hough	Noah West	3.03	4.20			Recurring	Recurring		
Nick Jandl	Dr. Caleb Rand	3.11	6.16			Recurring	Recurring		Guest
Andi Rayne and Nora Gill	Cadence Barkley	3.16	6.16			Recurring	Recurring	Recurring	Recurring
Christina Aguilera	Jade St. John	3.18	3.20			Recurring			
Kyle Dean Massey	Kevin Bicks	3.15	6.16			Recurring	Recurring	Recurring	Guest
Scott Reeves	Noel Laughlin	3.09	4.21			Recurring	Recurring		
Riley Smith	Markus Keen	4.02	4.10				Recurring		
Cynthia McWilliams	Gabriella Manning	4.02	4.10				Recurring		
Scout Taylor-Compton	Erin	4.05	4.12				Recurring		
Mark Collie	Frankie Gray	4.06	6.16				Recurring		Guest
Jessy Schram	Cash Gray	4.10	4.21				Recurring		
Alicia Witt	Autumn Chase	4.13	6.16				Recurring		Guest
Mandy June Turpin	Cynthia Davis	4.18	4.21				Recurring		
Rhiannon Giddens	Hallie Jordan	5.01	6.16					Recurring	Guest
Murray Bartlett	Jakob Fine	5.02	5.17					Recurring	
Moses Black	Pastor Lewis	5.02	5.08					Recurring	
Jordan Woods-Robinson	Randall St. Claire	5.02	5.05					Recurring	
Bridgit Mendler	Ashley Willerman	5.03	5.03					Guest	
Joseph David-Jones	Clayton Carter	5.03	6.16					Recurring	Guest
Linds Edwards	Carl Hockney	5.03	5.08					Recurring	
Jen Richards	Allyson Del Lago	5.04	5.06					Recurring	
Christian Coulson	Damien George	5.04	5.15					Recurring	
Ben Taylor	Flynn Burnett	5.06	6.03					Recurring	Recurring
Odessa Adlon	Liv	5.12	5.15					Recurring	
Rachel Bilson	Alyssa Greene	5.14	5.22					Recurring	
Myles Moore	Jake Maitlaind	5.22	6.16					Recurring	Recurring
Katrina Norman	Polly	5.20	5.22					Recurring	
Josh Stamberg	Darius Enright	6.01	6.16						Recurring
Nik Luken	Jonah Ford	6.01	6.15						Recurring
Dylan Arnold	Twig Wysecki	6.03	6.16						Recurring
Jake Etheridge	Sean McPherson	6.04	6.16						Recurring
Rainee Blake	Alannah Curtis	6.05	6.16						Recurring
Ilse DeLange	Ilse de Witt	6.08	6.16						Recurring
Mia Maestro	Rosa	6.11	6.15						Recurring
Ronny Cox	Gideon Claybourne	6.12	6.16						Recurring

== Characters ==
=== Main ===
Name	Actor	Starring seasons	Recurring/guest seasons	Status
Rayna Jaymes	Connie Britton	1–5	6	Deceased
Connie Britton in 2014 (plays Rayna Jaymes) Rayna Jaymes is a nine-time Grammy Award–winner and fifteen-time CMA Award–nominee, the daughter of the late Virginia Wyatt and her husband, corrupt, politically connected Nashville businessman Lamar Wyatt. She grew up in a wealthy family where her father Lamar had years ago been mayor of Nashville. Her mom died when she was 12. She and her father have long been largely estranged. She loves country music, but her father never approved her involvement with it and kicked her out of the house at 16. She becomes the leading female star with major Nashville recording label Edgehill. Early in her career she dated songwriter, guitar player and her longtime intermittent musical collaborator Deacon Claybourne, who is an alcoholic. Soon after Rayna had sent Deacon off to rehab (for what would be his last time), she married Teddy Conrad. The couple had two daughters, Maddie and Daphne. Teddy is aware that he is not Maddie's biological father (she was born very shortly after their marriage), and there are hints that this may be Deacon—which is revealed to be true later in season one. Her relationship with Teddy continues to deteriorate even as he is serving as mayor of Nashville (a position which he achieves largely due to Lamar's corrupt interference) and they eventually divorce. Rayna's relationship with her longtime record label, Edgehill Records, is also completely broken and she leaves them to start her own label, Highway 65, despite threats from Edgehill's management that they will destroy her if she goes through with it. After several false starts and a serious relationship with another major figure in the Nashville country music scene, and a long solo drive across the entire country in an old convertible, she marries Deacon in season four. Fighting to maintain control of her label and her career, she begins working on a "boxed set" project consisting of a career retrospective centering around her longtime personal and professional relationship with Deacon. While this project is still in the works, she dies after a car accident in season five. A flashback in the series finale shows Rayna promising Deacon that they are meant for each other no matter what forever and ever and will choose each other forever.
Juliette Barnes	Hayden Panettiere; Genevieve Jones (child)	1–6	—N/a	Alive
Hayden Panettiere in 2009 (plays Juliette Barnes) Juliette Jolene Barnes, born July 31, 1989, originally from Alabama, was discovered singing at a country fair by the man who became her manager, Glenn Goodman, who believed he could turn her into one of America's biggest country stars. Juliette, being young, beautiful and ambitious, had no qualms about leaving her dysfunctional home life and her drug-addicted mother behind. She quickly rose to become Edgehill Republic Records biggest star, a pop-country sensation, with legions of young teenage fans and sellout tours. Despite Juliette's singing talent being questioned by several characters, including Rayna, she shows not only raw talent but has also proven herself to be a capable songwriter and works with talented musicians such as Deacon Clayborne and Avery Barkley. Juliette and Rayna, however, have two things in common, both of them had bad parents and both of them left home when they were 16 to escape bad home situations and went on to become famous country music stars. Juliette is initially played as a demanding, arrogant diva, but there is another side to her, the main reason why she was the main protagonist/antagonist in the series. She is a girl who has fought for everything she has and was prepared to do anything to get to the top. However, her hard exterior shields a world of pain that she rarely lets people see. She has no real friends, no one she can truly turn to, and she has seen the worst of people growing up, which has left her unable to connect with people emotionally on a stable, long-term basis. As a result, she shows a desperate desire to be loved by anyone who shows her the slightest bit of affection, such as when she falls in love with her mother's drug counselor. It is very easy for her to attract the initial attention of men due to her great beauty. She becomes pregnant by Avery in season three and has a girl, Cadence. They marry, but their relationship remains intermittent and dysfunctional. (They eventually divorce, but remain in close contact due to their shared child.) After this she falls into postpartum depression and neglects her family until she inadvertently causes Jeff's death. After this she goes to treatment and is then there for her family for a time. After surviving a plane crash, she is a wheelchair user and she finds God through the help of the woman who finds her in the wreckage, a talented gospel singer whom she encourages in commercializing her talent. She becomes obsessed with self-improvement and especially the work of a bestselling self-help author, Darius. She joins his "movement", which is later revealed to be a mind-controlling cult. She soon becomes brainwashed by Darius' cult and begins neglecting her family to do the movement's work (and quits music). While in Bolivia, having been assigned by the movement to a remote compound there, Juliette discovers she is pregnant with another child, also by Avery. She meets another cult member whom she learns wants out but cannot risk leaving her son behind. Juliette realizes this will eventually be her own fate as well if she remains in Bolivia and gives birth there. With this woman's help she breaks out of the cult, despite their having confiscated her passport. Upon returning home, she attempts to take down the movement and announces that she is leaving the music business and retiring from the public eye and moves to a farm to raise Cadence, but promises Avery she's not running away. She hides the pregnancy from him for a few weeks after she tells him she loves him but she wants him to really want to be with her for the rest of their lives, not influenced by any pressure their new baby would exert on him emotionally. A flashforward shows a visibly pregnant Juliette playing with Cadence, and Avery coming back to them, seemingly wanting to be with Juliette for the rest of their lives.
Scarlett O'Connor	Clare Bowen	1–6	—N/a	Alive
Clare Bowen in 2014 (plays Scarlett O'Connor) Scarlett O'Connor, born in Mississippi, is a poet and songwriter. She is also Deacon's niece, and a talented singer and eventual relationship partner with Gunnar (they later perform as The Exes, even during a time when she is dating her dying mother's physician). When the character is introduced she was dating Avery Barkley. She befriends Bluebird Café soundboard engineer Gunnar Scott who suggests putting her poetry to music. This leads to them being noticed by Rayna Jaymes who wants them to embark on a music career as a duo. The two also pursue a romantic relationship after she splits from Avery but she calls it off after rejecting his marriage proposal. When her best friend Zoey Dalton arrives in town and starts waitressing at the Bluebird she befriends Gunnar and the two start dating. Scarlett becomes jealous of their relationship and refuses to talk to Zoey. She continues on singing as a soloist and has a short relationship with producer Liam McGuinnis, who also supplies her with prescription medication to help combat tiredness when he has her working all night to get songs out of her, which results in her becoming dependent on the meds. Rayna tells him to break off the relationship when she catches them kissing and Liam departs for Tokyo, leaving Scarlett devastated. Scarlett eventually has a breakdown on stage and is hospitalized with severe depression. After she recovers enough to leave the hospital, Rayna agrees to release her from her contract. After Zoey breaks up with Gunnar since she thinks he still has feelings for Scarlett, the latter takes her place in the band she formed with Gunnar and Avery and their name is changed to the Triple X's, apt due to her past relationship with each of them. Following the birth of his daughter with Juliette, Avery departs the band and Gunnar and Scarlett continue on as a duo. Gunnar also falls for a technician called Erin and has a short fling with her, as well as another with singer Autumn Chase, while Scarlett realizes she is still in love with Gunnar. They eventually get back together. Their relationship lasts a few months until the arrival of Damien George, who has been hired to direct one of their music videos. He is exceptionally hard on Scarlett, which he says is to stretch her out of her comfort zone and get her best work out of her. Scarlett realizes she may have romantic feelings for him and breaks up with Gunnar again. She later discovers that she is pregnant but does not know who the father is. She requests a paternity test, which confirms that Gunnar is not the father of her baby. After being hit while being held at gunpoint with Gunnar during a holdup in East Nashville, she loses her baby. In season six, she quits music and joins work at a horse farm where work is done to assist victims of PTSD and other mental conditions. A flashforward at the end of the series reveals Scarlett became an engaged to another man and it is unknown where her career went.
Theodore 'Teddy' Conrad	Eric Close	1–3	4–5	Alive
Eric Close in 2008 (plays Teddy Conrad) Teddy Conrad is Rayna's husband who, after a business failure, is now living on his wife's income. He runs for mayor with help from his father-in-law and wins election, in large measure due to the corruption of Lamar and his connections. His relationship with Rayna continues deteriorating during his time as mayor, and they eventually divorce and he moves out. He later is set up for blackmail with a beautiful paramour, and eventually is arrested for his involvement with some of Lamar's shady dealings in the past at the end of season three, and sentenced to prison, where he is eventually visited by his former wife and their children. Later, the prison gives him a three-day pass to mourn his ex-wife and be there for his children at the time of their mother's death. Before being returned to custody, he stops by to express appreciation to Deacon for the job that he is doing raising their shared daughters. He was scheduled to be released from prison in October 2016, but the character was written out of the series and never appeared again.
Deacon Claybourne	Charles Esten	1–6	—N/a	Alive
Charles Esten in 2016 (plays Deacon Claybourne) Deacon Claybourne was a loyal companion to Rayna Jaymes — both onstage and off. The talented musician became Rayna's band leader, guitar player, songwriter, and romantic partner when the duo paired up 20 years ago. And while things didn't exactly work out for the two stars in the romance department — Deacon's inner turmoil runs deep — the pair has successfully carried on a loyal, professional partnership. He had been sober for thirteen years until he found out that Maddie was his biological daughter. He then relapsed and began drinking for a short amount of time, causing a serious vehicle accident in which he and Rayna are both badly injured, before getting sober again. He has had a brief fling with Rayna's onetime labelmate and nemesis, Juliette. Once Teddy is out of the picture he is at first ambivalent about trying to resume their personal relationship, but is very uncomfortable with Rayna's involvement with major country star Luke Wheeler, especially when this leads to Wheeler and Rayna's getting engaged. After this engagement is broken off, he resumes his relationship with Rayna. When he was diagnosed with a cancerous tumor (likely due to his past heavy drinking), Rayna, Maddie, and Daphne stay by his side and he proposes to Rayna, which she accepts. They married during season four, and months later she dies (in June 2016) due to injuries sustained following a car crash in downtown Nashville. With their legal father Teddy (who is also the biological father of Daphne) in prison, he becomes legal guardian of Maddie Conrad and Daphne Conrad. He also takes over co-ownership of Highway 65 following his wife's death, wondering how much of the label's resources he owes to her career retrospective project in order to be true to her memory. He later finds short-term happiness with Jessie, overcoming much of the guilt he has about this relationship due to his memories of Rayna; however, the two break up later on, but remain strongly attracted to each other. Deacon eventually goes on his own tour and makes amends with his alcoholic father, who has recently appeared in Nashville after having been out of Deacon's life for decades and who has been efforts to remain sober. A flashback in the series finale shows Rayna promising Deacon that they are meant for each other no matter what forever and ever.
Avery Barkley	Jonathan Jackson	1–6	—N/a	Alive
Jonathan Jackson in 2013 (plays Avery Barkley) Avery Aaron Barkley, born January 16, 1986, begins as an aspiring musician with a restless bad-boy streak. He and Scarlett are in a relationship when the series begins, but soon separate. In season two, he dates Juliette but breaks up with her after finding out that she cheated on him with Jeff Fordham. In season rthree, it is revealed that Avery is the father of Juliette's baby, and Avery and Juliette marry later in the season, but divorce in season four after Juliette abandons him. However, they reunite, and put their wedding rings back on, but do not discuss their issues they had the past two seasons. Juliette survives a plane crash that leaves her as the sole survivor and debilitated not only physically but with survivor's guilt; he takes care of her and their daughter during her long convalescence, eventually asking if they are back together or not. Juliette is unsure about where their relationship is at that particular time. In season five, when he gets an offer to go out on tour he turns it down due to Juliette needing his help as she continues to recover. After Juliette leaves Avery and Cadence again, this time for a cult, he decides he is done feeling for her and trying with her. In season six, Avery begins working in a band with Will and Gunnar, and has a short-lived romance with new band member Alannah. A flashforward reveals that their band, without Alannah, is a success. A flash forward shows a visibly pregnant Juliette playing with Cadence, and Avery coming back to them, wanting to be with Juliette, presumably for the rest of their lives.
Gunnar Scott	Sam Palladio	1–6	—N/a	Alive
Sam Palladio in 2014 (plays Gunnar Scott) Gunnar Scott, born in Austin, Texas, is a kind-hearted aspiring musician who dates Scarlett in season one, and dates Zoey in season two. He has an on-and-off again relationship with Scarlett for most of the rest of the series. In season one, Gunnar and Scarlett O'Connor both work at the Bluebird Café, a showcase for many aspiring country artists. He encourages her to turn some poems she's written into songs, and volunteers her to sing at an open mic night. She gets him to play with her on guitar. Watty White hears them singing and offers to cut a demo for them. He also calls Rayna Jaymes to give her a listen. Sometime later, when Rayna is working to start her own record label, she remembers, and has Scarlett and Gunnar invited to audition for her. However, Gunnar is grieving for his brother, Jason Scott, and doesn't make it to the audition. Scarlett auditions alone, with her banjo. Rayna leaves the audition early, but is impressed enough that Scarlett is offered a recording contract. However, she keeps the offer a secret from Gunnar, until their new upstairs neighbor, Will Lexington, hands them some mail that he says was misdirected. Will seems to be a good influence on Gunnar, getting him song-writing again. It is revealed that Will is gay when he makes a move on Gunnar. Gunnar turns him down, but after Gunnar's original shock they remain close friends and he remains someone who Will can confide in, and who he can act himself around. Scarlett arranges for Gunnar to be given a chance to audition for Rayna, but he wants to sing a new type of music with Will, and wants time to figure out what kind of music he wants to play. He finds some lyrics written by his dead brother, Jason and, with some tips on performance from Will, Gunnar earns a business card from an agent, Jack Nelson, who offers to record a demo for him. In the season one finale, Gunnar proposes to Scarlett but it is eventually revealed in season two that she turned it down and they break up. When her best friend from her hometown, Zoey Dalton, shows up in Nashville she and Gunnar soon develop a strong mutual attraction and start dating, which causes tension between the two best friends. Zoey starts to become jealous when Gunnar's ex-girlfriend from his hometown, Kiley, shows up. She has a son named Micah, whom she says is Gunnar's son. However, she later reveals that Jason raped her and Micah is actually his son. When Micah learns that Gunnar is not his father he wants to leave, but the two eventually make amends and promise to remain in touch. In season three, Gunnar forms a new band with Zoey and Avery, called "ZAG", but Zoey ends up becoming jealous when Gunnar starts reconnecting with Scarlett and they split with her leaving town when she sees Scarlett onstage with Gunnar and Avery at the Nashville winter music festival. The trio are renamed "The Triple Exes". After Avery departs the band following Juliette giving birth to their daughter, Scarlett and Gunnar continue on as a duo called "The Exes". Gunnar and Scarlett, for a short time, reconnect during season four. In season five, their relationship is tested once more by the arrival of music video director Damien George, hired to make a video for their new single. After Damien challenges her to let herself go, she realizes she may have feelings for him and she breaks up with Gunnar again. She eventually finds out that she is pregnant but is not sure who the father is. Gunnar is revealed not to be the father, but he says he wants to be there for Scarlett anyway. However, when he and Scarlett are held up outside an East Nashville grocery store, Scarlett miscarries from the trauma suffered in the event and Gunnar's guilt over his failure to do anything to prevent their being robbed or Scarlett from being hurt poisons his feelings both about himself and anything that remained of their relationship. He goes on to form a band with Avery and Will, just as a lark at first, but they soon become serious about the project and start to get high-profile and lucrative bookings. He later has a relationship with new band member Alannah, a female singer who has previously been an aspiring Nashville solo artist, whom they invite to join the band, in part to break out of being typecast as a part of the "bro-county" movement. Her style is neither precisely country or rock, and she soon leaves the group after having bedded both him and Avery, to further her solo career. A flashforward in the series finale reveals that he, Avery, and Will had a successful band.
Coleman Carlisle	Robert Ray Wisdom	1	2	Alive
Coleman Carlisle is a one-time mayoral candidate, and later Deputy Mayor. He is a close friend of Rayna, and serves as Deacon's sobriety sponsor. In Season 2, Coleman leaves Nashville, deciding to enjoy his life with his family away from the pressures of politics.
Lamar Wyatt	Powers Boothe	1	2	Deceased
Powers Boothe in 2005 (plays Lamar Wyatt) Lamar Wyatt is Rayna's father and a wealthy, powerful, and controlling patriarch and politically connected local real estate developer who disapproves of his daughter's career as a country singer. He later dies of a heart attack while son-in-law Teddy watches and does nothing. In season one, it was revealed that Lamar's wife had long ago died, leaving him a widower and single father to his two daughters, Rayna and Tandy. Tandy worked at his side and is the heir apparent to Lamar's fortune and business empire. She was his top aide. Rayna and Lamar had a strained relationship. It is at first implied, and later made explicit, that (as Raynna suspected) he was responsible for his wife's death. In season two, Lamar is arrested when his shady business dealings catch up with him. Lamar plans an assassination attempt against Teddy, whom he feels has betrayed him. Weeks after returning home from jail, he has a heart attack while alone with Teddy discussing their situation. Teddy lets him die, not calling for help until he knows it will arrive too late to do Lamar any good.
Will Lexington	Chris Carmack	2–6	1	Alive
Chris Carmack in 2008 (plays Will Lexington) Will Lexington, an aspiring country singer from Texas, is introduced as Scarlett and Gunnar's East Nashville neighbor and later becomes their friend. In season one, he is a closeted gay man trying to make a name for himself in a highly prejudiced business and society, and reveals his true nature to Gunnar when he tries to kiss him. They temporarily fall out and Will finds himself unable to accept who he truly is and attempts suicide by standing in front of a train, only to back out at the last moment. He starts a relationship with talent show runner-up Layla Grant, which is merely a publicity stunt, but in spite of Gunnar's attempts to get him to confess his true sexuality to her he proposes to her instead, and they marry. While filming a reality TV show they become the subjects of, Love & Country, Will confesses that he is gay to Layla while the cameras are rolling, having been hidden in their private bedroom which was supposed to have been off-limits to the show. After she attempts to commit suicide he agrees to grant her a divorce but they remain close friends afterwards, until she blackmails him in season three. Will falls for successful, established country songwriter Kevin Bicks, one of very few openly gay people in the country music industry, and they have an on-off relationship when Will is still unsure about coming out since it could harm him further with his fan base. When his father visits he has to hide his true nature since his father is homophobic but when Will holds a press conference he finally has the courage to come out, in the season three finale, as he wants to be open and with Kevin. Although his father initially disowns his son, they make up when Will's mother dies. He continually has to defend himself in the media and resumes his relationship with Kevin Bicks, which ends once again when he does not want to move in with him, in season five, when the writers ended his relationship with Bicks in favor of a new character. He moves on when he meets Zach, a powerful West Coast internet multi-millionaire. They eventually start to date, but Zach may have ulterior motives. The two break up after Zach threatens Highway 65. In season six, Will joins a band with Gunnar, Avery, and then Alannah. He also falls to the overuse of prescription drugs and steroids, which causes him to collapse during the band's late night talk show performance on national television; although has to receive hospital treatment for passing out due to a bout of endocarditis, he eventually recovers and rejoins the band. A flashfoward in the series finale reveals he and Zach got back together and that the boys' band (minus Alannah) is a success.
Maddie Conrad/Jaymes	Lennon Stella	2–6	1	Alive
The daughter of Rayna Jaymes and Deacon Claybourne, Maddie Conrad is Rayna's elder daughter, legal daughter to Teddy, and biological daughter to Deacon. When Teddy and Rayna announce their plans to divorce, Maddie takes it hard and begins to rebel against her mother. She ditches school to attend a free concert thrown by Juliette, but ends up being injured in a stampede. Maddie wants to join the music business, in part because she has a large talent for it, but also because her mother won't let her. Juliette wants Maddie to leave home and tour with her, which Rayna will not allow because of Rayna's own lifestyle, and Juliette's lifestyle as well, when each became a singer on the road at a young age. Maddie and Rayna don't see eye to eye things, but they do care about each other deeply, even when Maddie and Rayna were arguing, as in season 4, when Maddie rebelliously wants to sign a recording contract at age 16. Rayna is just like Maddie at that age; she and her father Lamar didn't see eye to eye over music and Rayna had left home and tried not to look back. Maddie was legally emancipated by court action in which her lawyer discloses violent alcoholic episodes in Deacon's past later in season 4, implying his unfitness to be her father, but Maddie was rescued from the evil intentions of her new label head, who had taken her to New York City, and she is reconciled to Rayna and Deacon and back home by the end of season 4. In season 5 she is 17 years old and initially working as an office assistant ("gopher") for her mother's record company. Maddie's career skyrockets in season five. Maddie tries hard to mend her ways, beginning a relationship with talented-but-troubled street musician Clayton Carter, after having previously gotten serious with Colt, son of her mother's one-time love interest and thus potentially her step-brother. When Rayna is involved in a car crash Maddie feels guilty for having been so horrible to her at times. Rayna eventually succumbs to her injuries in the hospital after the wreck and dies. After her performing a moving tribute to Rayna at the CMT Awards, the media starts to take an interest in her as a talent in her own right and Juliette takes her to New York, to show her the ropes of navigating a career, where she changes her stage name to Maddie Jaymes in honor of her mother. Juliette decides to manage Maddie's career. This later ends completely when Juliette steals a song Maddie wrote, passing it off as her own work and poisoning their relationship in the process. After this Maddie continues to navigate the business by herself. Maddie ends up deciding to say single after breaking up with major pop idol Jonah, with whom she has a highly publicized relationship, and rejects the advances of his personal assistant "Twig", who was secretly in love with her and who had facilitated her breakup with Jonah by making it inevitable for her to discover that Jonah was being unfaithful to her. She moves into a place of her own in a flashforward.
Daphne Conrad	Maisy Stella	2–6	1	Alive
Daphne Conrad is Rayna and Teddy's younger daughter. Once Maddie begins causing trouble later in the series, Daphne starts to feel shunned and feels even more alone when Deacon asks Rayna to marry him as she feels he is replacing Teddy as a father figure. She is also hurt and confused as Maddie begins to develop a career as a solo artist, since as children they had always performed together. This is aggravated as she learns that Deacon is her sister's biological father. When Rayna dies in season five, she finally accepts Deacon as her father, just as she begins to become more rebellious and begins to hang out with a street girl she has met, Liv. She decides that she has led an incredibly sheltered life and yearns for authentic experiences such as Liv has had, but at the same time feels very sorry for Liv, who has never known true parental love or a stable home, and arranges for her to come to live with the family for a short while. She also decides she wants her own music career and successfully auditions for Nashville's Next, a TV talent competition being staged by disreputable record label owner Brad Maitland, whose former wife had started to date Deacon after Rayna's death, and who has a son about Daphne's age. Daphne ends up losing the contest, but signs with Highway 65 in a closing flashforward.
Luke Wheeler	Will Chase	3–4	2, 5–6	Alive
Will Chase in 2006 (plays Luke Wheeler) Luke Wheeler is one of the biggest long-running male country music artists in Nashville, and a love interest for Rayna. He asks her to marry him in the season two finale. During the third season, Rayna breaks off her engagement to Luke, even as her daughter Maddie becomes increasingly involved with his son Colt, all of which makes him heartbroken and bitter about their breakup. After the split Luke begins to focus more on his music and creates his own label, Wheelin' Dealin' Records, signing Will and Juliette. He becomes Will's advocate in season four, telling country fans it is long past time for many of them to overcome their anti-gay prejudices in a series of high-profile media appearances. He leaves town after successfully helping Will to take down conservative pundit Cynthia Davis and later reveals that his heart is no longer in promoting his label so he agrees to sell it to Rayna and Zach Welles, and leaves the series (at least in part due to the new writers' lack of interest in writing for this character).
Jeff Fordham	Oliver Hudson	3	2, 4	Deceased
Oliver Hudson in 2010 (plays Jeff Fordham) Jeff Fordham was the new label record executive in the second season, who clashes with Rayna and Juliette, and eventually has sex with Juliette, thus giving her opportunity to cheat on Avery. He was fired from his record company and began secretly dating Layla and managing her music career before being hired as Luke Wheeler's label CEO just before he fell to his death trying to save Juliette Barnes from suicide. Jeff's accomplishments include bringing country phenom Luke Wheeler over to Edgehill and signing up-and-coming artists Layla Grant and Will Lexington. However, these accomplishments pale in comparison to losing the company's two top-grossing artists. In season three, with his job on the line, Jeff went to Teddy Conrad saying that he had to sign Maddie with Edgehill or Jeff would reveal that Teddy had used taxpayer money for sex, since the young woman Teddy had been involved with was in fact a high-end prostitute. Fordham was fired by Edgehill's Board of Directors after Rayna revealed his wrongdoings at a corporate meeting, mostly concerning the near death of Layla Grant, at a local party. Shortly thereafter, Edgehill Republic Records was dissolved. He decided to help Layla Grant re-establish herself as a mature artist and she asked him to become her manager. Thanks to certain connections, he was able to get her signed to Highway 65 and secured her a spot opening for Jade St. John. He also wanted to be president of Luke Wheeler's new label but Luke would not allow it. In season four, he became Juliette Barnes's manager after she left Highway 65. Jeff had the CEO job of Wheelin' Deelin' Records and had asked Layla to move in with him. But, in the sixth episode of the fourth season, he saw Juliette stumbling around on the roof outside, and saw that she was trying to commit suicide, and he died saving her life.
Layla Grant	Aubrey Peeples	4	2–3	Alive
Layla Grant started off as the runner-up in a singing competition and a new singer in Nashville who is a new rival for Juliette. She gets dropped from the label after her single tanks, though she strikes up a (one-sided) romance with Will, and they eventually get engaged. She is a participant in a reality show featuring her and Will, and their impending nuptials.[11][15] She and Will get married; he later tells her that he is gay during what he thought was a private moment but which actually is being taped as a part their reality show, even though the discussion was going on in a part of their home that was supposedly totally off limits to the show producers. Layla goes to Jeff Fordham and demands to make her next album go gold, or she will out Will. Layla and Will are now divorced and she began secretly dating Jeff, who managed her music career. She plays Avery in season four, pretending to like him as they date for a short time, while actually using just him to get back at Juliette. He figures this out and breaks up with her in the season four finale, and due to the new management of the show, the character was never seen again, nor written out.
Zach Welles	Cameron Scoggins	5	6	Alive
Zach Welles is a wealthy Silicon Valley tech entrepreneur who helps Rayna out with financially struggling Highway 65, saving the business in exchange for an equity stake. He begins dating Will and begins to take control of Highway 65, and manipulate Deacon, despite owning only twenty percent, after Rayna dies. After the artists of Highway 65 take a stand against him, telling him that Highway 65 is worthless without Deacon and that to them Deacon IS Highway 65, he leaves town to run for Congress in California. He and Will then break up, but he comes back to Nashville for a visit to check in on Will after he has as attack due to endocarditis due to intravenous abuse of steroids. They are later seen together in a flashforward in the series finale getting back together.
Jessie Caine	Kaitlin Doubleday	5–6	—N/a	Alive
Jessie Caine is a musician who returns to town to focus on her career and take back the son who was taken from her by her exploitative and emotionally controlling ex-husband. However, in season six, she never sings, but she begins dating Deacon as he attempts to continue to recover from the devastating shock of Rayna's death. She becomes interested in going back to school to study psychology and also has to deal with her cocky, manipulative and abusive ex, Brad Maitland, who owns a major label in town, Bright Shiny Records. Jessie ends up staying single and gains full custody of her son when Brad's extensive history of sexual exploitation, intimidation, harassment and abuse is finally fully documented and threatened to be revealed. A flashforward shows Jessie happy with her son.
Brad Maitland	Jeff Nordling	6	5	Alive
Brad Maitland is the charming and narcissistic owner of the most successful record labels in Nashville, Bright Shiny Records, and Jessie's ex-husband, who is up to no good. He has also started a new and popular talent contest TV series, Nashville's Next. Much of his plot line centers on his custody of his son and his emotional abuse of Jessie and his son. Additionally, he has made unwanted moves on many women in Nashville (apparently almost every young and attractive woman who has ever worked for him or around him), and Alannah sets out to run him out of town and ruin his career after he begins coming on to her as the price for his help with her career. After Alannah and several other women corner Brad, Zach "allows" Brad to sell his label to him at far below market price to prevent any more of the (true) allegations against him from becoming public knowledge and Jessie gains full custody of their son.

=== Recurring ===
The following characters of Nashville may or may not be particularly significant to the story of the series; each was introduced in one season and would usually appear in subsequent seasons to a greater or lesser extent.

- Judith Hoag as Tandy Hampton (season 1–3), Rayna's sister, the daughter and protégé of Lamar Wyatt, who plays referee to Rayna and Lamar. She leaves Nashville after accepting a job in San Francisco.
- Kimberly Williams-Paisley as Margaret "Peggy" Kenter (seasons 1 & 2; 20 episodes), Teddy's former co-worker at the credit union who helped him hide his embezzlement. They begin dating after Teddy and Rayna separate and marry after she lies to Teddy that she is pregnant. She is shot and killed while someone was attempting to kill Teddy.
- David Alford as Bucky Dawes, Rayna's long-time seasoned and caring manager.
- Ed Amatrudo as Glenn Goodman, Juliette Barnes's protective and reliable manager, often tasked with cleaning up the messes that Juliette leaves behind. In the fourth season Juliette refers to him as "the man who has been like a father to me" and "my lucky charm."
- Sylvia Jefferies as Jolene Barnes (season 1,3,5-6; 17 episodes), Juliette's overprotective & overbearing mother; a drug addict who later commits a murder-suicide.
- Michiel Huisman as Liam McGuinnis (seasons 1 & 2; 13 episodes), Rayna's new music producer, who also has a brief fling with Rayna and Scarlett.
- Chaley Rose as Zoey Dalton (seasons 2–4), Scarlett's childhood best friend who moves to Nashville, who starts dated Gunnar. She eventually gets a job as a backup singer for Juliette. She later breaks up with Gunnar and leaves Nashville to pursue a solo singing career in Los Angeles.
- Laura Benanti as Sadie Stone (season 3), a country star who gets an offer to sign with Edgehill but later signs with Highway 65. She and Rayna become good friends. She leaves Nashville after shooting and killing her abusive ex-husband.
- Brette Taylor as Pam (season 3), as Luke's new backup singer, and has a brief fling with Deacon.
- Alexa Vega as Kiley Brenner (season 3), Gunnar's first love who is now a struggling single mother. She lied to Gunnar saying that her 9-year-old son was Gunnar's but his brother Jason actually is.
- Derek Hough as Noah West (season 3–4), an actor who lands a role about a famous country singer.
- Christina Aguilera as Jade St. John (season 3), a pop singer who is trying to make it in country music.
- Jay Hernandez as Dante Rivas (season 1; 6 episodes), Jolene's sober companion and Juliette's lover, who, after attempting to blackmail Juliette, is killed by Jolene in a murder-suicide.
- Charlie Bewley as Charles "Charlie" Wentworth (season 2), a married confident business man, who owns a radio stations across the country, and had an affair with Juliette.
- Christina Chang as Megan Vannoy (season 2), Deacon's lawyer at the beginning of season two; Deacon and Megan were in a romantic relationship in season two until Deacon found out that she cheated on him with Teddy.
- Todd Truley as Marshall Evans (season 1; 11 episodes), former president and CEO of Edgehill Republic Records. In the beginning of season two he gets fired by the board of Edgehill Records and is replaced by Jeff Fordham.
- JD Souther as Watty White (season 1; 6 episodes), legendary country music producer, radio personality, and songwriter who counsels Rayna Jaymes.
- Kourtney Hansen as Emily (seasons 1–6; 60 episodes), Juliette's assistant and friend.
- Tilky Montgomery Jones as Sean Butler (season 1; 5 episodes), professional football quarterback and Juliette's ex-husband.
- Rya Kihlstedt as Marilyn Rhodes (season 1; 8 episodes), Avery's former manager and lover.
- Wyclef Jean as Dominic King (season 1; 5 episodes), the head of Avery's former label.
- Chloe Bennet as Hailey (season 1; 7 episodes), briefly dated Gunnar.
- Susan Misner as Stacy (season 1; 5 episodes), a veterinarian and Deacon's ex-girlfriend.
- Burgess Jenkins as Randy Roberts (season 1; 3 episodes), a long-time friend and music producer for Rayna Jaymes.
- Afton Williamson as Makena (season 1; 3 episodes), Juliette's press agent who manages her career and fosters her reputation.
- David Clayton Rogers as Jason Scott (season 1; 3 episodes), Gunnar's brother, who got convicted to an 8-year sentence after armed robbery. He is beaten to death after Gunnar throws the gun he has acquired, illegally, in a river. He taught Gunnar to play the guitar.
- Derrick Worsley as School Principal (season 3; episode 4), Radio Station Employee (season 2; episode 20), Background Singer (season 2; episode 14), and Police Chief (season 2; episode 11)
- J. Karen Thomas as Audrey Carlisle, Coleman's wife (season 1; 4 episodes).
- Derek Krantz as Brent McKinney (seasons 1 & 2; 12 episodes), Brent is an openly gay former marketing and public relations employee for Edgehill. He once dated Will.
- Nick Jandi as Dr. Caleb Rand (seasons 3–4; 19 episodes), a doctor who Scarlett and Deacon meet when Deacon comes down with liver cancer. Scareltt initially grows close to him as she is worried about Deacon, but the two form a romantic relationship. She breaks up with him in season four when she realizes she has feelings for Gunnar lingering.
- Moniqua Plante as Natasha, (season 3; 10 episodes), a prostitute who Jeff uses to grow close to Teddy (without telling Teddy who she really is) and uses to blackmail Teddy. She eventually begins working with the police through a wire to incriminate Teddy to take down Tandy.
- Gunnar Sizemore as Micah Brenner, (season 3; 12 episodes), Kiley and Jason's son, Gunnar's nephew for who Kiley lies to Gunnar and tells is his son which leads to a custody battle.
- Keean Johnson as Colt Wheeler, (seasons 2–4; 25 episodes), Luke's son who dates Maddie.
- Brette Taylor as Pam York, (season 3; 5 episodes), a backup singer on Will's tour who has a fling with Deacon and helps him through the grief that he is going through when Rayna rejects his proposal.
- Mykelti Williamson as Terry George, (season 3; 9 episodes), a homeless man who Scarlett befriends and helps get back on her feet when she asks him to help her write music.
- Christina Aguilera as Jade St. John, (season 3; 3 episodes), a pop singer who wants to make a country album.
- Scott Reeves as Noel Laughlin, (seasons 3–4; 20 episodes), Scarlett and Gunnar's manager who is never written for due to lack of knowledge of in seasons five and six.
- Rex Linn as Bill Lexington, (seasons 3–4; 3 episodes), Will's homophobic dad who believes Will killed his mother.
- Kyle Dean Massey as Kevin Bicks (seasons 3–5; 14 episodes), An openly gay country music singer-songwriter who collaborates with Will on his music. He later becomes Will's boyfriend.
- Riley Smith as Markus Keen, (season 4; 6 episodes), a hotshot member of a newly broken up band who Rayna spends millions to sign and is a trouble to work with. He leaves when he finishes his record and his band gets back together.
- Cynthia McWilliams as Gabriella Manning, (season 4; 5 episodes), Luke's assistant who helps him learn the workings of a record label. She and Will have a fling but she leaves when he refuses to accept Will in the public eye.
- Michael Lowry as Kenneth Devine, (season 4; 5 episodes), Luke's assistant for his new label.
- Scout Taylor-Compton as Erin, (season 4; 6 episodes), a roadie for Juliette's tour who has a fling with Gunnar.
- Katie Callaway as Christel, (season 4; 5 episodes), Luke's intern for his new label.
- Mark Collie as Frankie (season 4; 14 episodes), a failing bar owner who Deacon buys out to start The Beverly who ends up hurting the family.
- Jessy Schram as Cash Gray, (season 4; 12 episodes), Frankie's daughter who poisons Maddie's opinion of her family and helps her get emancipated and launch a solo career.
- Rhiannon Giddens as Hallie Jordan (seasons 5–6; 20 episodes), a church woman who saves Juliette after her plane crash and eventually Juliette gets signed to Highway 65.
- Joseph David-Jones as Clayton "Clay" Carter (season 5; 14 episodes), Maddie's bipolar rough boyfriend.
- Christian Coulson as Damien George (season 5; 9 episodes), a hotshot music video director who works with The Exes. Scarlett has feelings for him and he eventually ends up being the father of her deceased baby.
- Katrina Norman as Polly (season 5; 3 episodes), a stunning-road manager who wants Avery to leave Juliette.
- Linds Edwards as Carl Hockeny (season 5; 6 episodes), Rayna's stalker who indirectly causes her death.
- Ben Taylor as Flynn Burnett (seasons 5–6; 9 episodes), a love interest for Daphne.
- Odessa Adlon as Liv (season 5; 6 episodes), a homeless girl Daphne befriends.
- Jordan Woods-Robinson as Randall St. Claire (season 5), Rayna's intern who is obsessed with her.
- Murray Bartlett as Jakob Fine (season 5-6), a fashion designer who wants Will to leave Kevin.
- Josh Stamberg as Darius (season 6), the president of a cult in Nashville who propositions Juliette and brainwashes her to work for him and leave her family while quitting music.
- Jake Etheridge as Sean (season 6), a recent military veteran suffering from severe PTSD who has yet to embrace his talent and passion for music. Scarlett meets him at the horse farm and grows close to him.
- Rainee Lyleson as Alannah (season 6), a newcomer to the Nashville music scene, and a beautiful singer-songwriter who starts out as a backup singer but will soon be discovered for the star that she actually is meant to be when she joins Avery, Will, and Gunnar's band. Gunnar and Alannah have a fling.
- Nic Luken as Jonah Ford (season 6), a famous male pop star who is very handsome, extremely confident, and charming. He and Maddie date.
- Dylan Arnold as Twig (season 6), a childhood friend to Jonah who has feelings for Maddie.
- Ilse DeLange as Ilse de Witt (season 6), a female coach on a talent show Daphne joins.
- Mia Maestro as Rosa (season 6), a dedicated follower of Darius’ cult who now is having doubts about her role in it.
- Ronny Cox as Gideon (season 6), a crusty, frustrated, would-be musician and recently reformed lifelong alcoholic who resented his son Deacon's success.

== Notable guest stars ==
=== Cameos ===
- Katie Couric as herself
- Kate York as herself
- Vince Gill as himself
- Pam Tillis as herself
- Little Jimmy Dickens as himself
- Del McCoury as himself
- Kip Moore as himself
- Dan Auerbach as himself
- The Band Perry as Themselves
- Brad Paisley as himself
- Conan O'Brien as himself
- Kelly Clarkson as herself
- Zac Brown as himself
- Jay DeMarcus as himself
- Carrie Underwood as herself
- Michelle Obama as herself
- Kellie Pickler as herself
- Austin Dillon as himself
- Mario Lopez as himself
- Barbara Walters as herself
- Whoopi Goldberg as herself
- Sherri Shepherd as herself
- Jenny McCarthy as herself
- Robin Roberts as herself
- Maria Menounos as herself
- Luke Bryan as himself
- Joe Nichols as himself
- Sara Evans as herself
- Florida Georgia Line as Themselves
- Steven Tyler as himself
- Thomas Rhett as himself
- Kesha as herself
- Kelsea Ballerini as herself
- Elton John as himself
- Megan Barry as herself
- Carolina Chocolate Drops as Nashville Chocolate Drops
- Kathie Lee Gifford as herself
- Hoda Kotb as herself
- Carla Gugino as Virginia Wyatt
- Ruby Amanfu as herself
- Blair Garner as himself
- Trevor Noah as himself
- Harry Connick Jr. as himself
- Michael Ray as himself
- Jaden Smith as himself
- Cassadee Pope as herself
- RaeLynn as herself
- Lauren Alaina as herself
- Kacey Musgraves as herself
- Danielle Bradbery as herself
- Maddie & Tae as themselves
- Brantley Gilbert as himself
- Chris Young as himself
- Steve Earle as himself

=== Actors ===
- Ming-Na Wen as Calista Reeve (1 episode)
- Nicholas Pryor as Sam Boone (1 episode)
- Dana Wheeler-Nicholson as Beverly O'Connor (7 episodes)
- Charlotte Ross as Ruth Bennett (1 episode)
- Bridgit Mendler as Ashley Wilkenson (1 episode)
