= Nashville season 4 =

2015–2016 season of American TV series

Nashville
- Season 4
- Season 4 promotional poster
- Starring: Connie Britton; Hayden Panettiere; Clare Bowen; Chris Carmack; Will Chase; Charles Esten; Jonathan Jackson; Sam Palladio; Aubrey Peeples; Lennon Stella; Maisy Stella
- No. of episodes: 21

Release
- Original network: ABC
- Original release: September 23, 2015 – May 25, 2016

Season chronology
- ← Previous; Season 3 Next → Season 5

The fourth season of the American television musical drama series Nashville, created by Callie Khouri, premiered on September 23, 2015, on ABC and concluded on May 25, 2016. The show features an ensemble cast with Connie Britton and Hayden Panettiere in the leading roles as two country music superstars, Rayna Jaymes and Juliette Barnes. The season consisted of 21 episodes and was the last season to air on ABC before the series moved to CMT.

As with season three, the episodes are named after songs from a variety of country artists, including Lucinda Williams ("Can't Let Go"), Conway Twitty ("'Til The Pain Outwears The Shame"), Waylon Jennings ("Stop the World (And Let Me Off)"), Patty Loveless ("How Can I Help You Say Goodbye"), Reba McEntire ("How Does It Feel To Be Free") and LeAnn Rimes ("What I Cannot Change").

== Production ==
On May 7, 2015, Nashville was renewed for a fourth season by ABC. The writers began work on the season on May 26, 2015. This season will receive a $10 million incentive package from the state of Tennessee, and other local groups, more than the Season 3 incentives — which totaled $8 million. Filming began on July 17, 2015. The third episode was shot on August 7, 2015. Filming for Season 4 was completed on April 4, 2016.

== Cast ==
The third season was the last to feature Eric Close as a series regular; he will no longer appear in the show as a main cast member. On July 25, 2015 Riley Smith was cast as Markus Keen, for a season long arc. Keen will be the newest Highway 65 artist, and Rayna promises to help him strip down his sound. When he realizes how much the label needs his album to be a hit, he begins to control Rayna. On October 13, 2015, it was announced that Hayden Panettiere would be temporarily leaving the series to receive treatment for post-partum depression; at the time she had completed seven episodes. Panettiere returned to the set on January 8, 2016 to begin work on the fourteenth episode.

=== Regular ===
- Connie Britton as Rayna Jaymes
- Hayden Panettiere as Juliette Barnes
- Charles Esten as Deacon Claybourne
- Clare Bowen as Scarlett O'Connor
- Sam Palladio as Gunnar Scott
- Jonathan Jackson as Avery Barkley
- Chris Carmack as Will Lexington
- Will Chase as Luke Wheeler
- Lennon Stella as Maddie Conrad
- Maisy Stella as Daphne Conrad
- Aubrey Peeples as Layla Grant

=== Recurring ===
- Nick Jandl as Dr. Caleb Rand
- David Alford as Bucky Dawes
- Ed Amatrudo as Glenn Goodman
- Andi Rayne and Nora Gill as Cadence Barkley
- Riley Smith as Markus Keen
- Kourtney Hansen as Emily
- Cynthia McWilliams as Gabriella Manning
- Scott Reeves as Noel Laughlin
- Michael Lowry as Kenneth Devine
- Keean Johnson as Colt Wheeler
- Kyle Dean Massey as Kevin Bicks
- Oliver Hudson as Jeff Fordham
- Scout Taylor-Compton as Erin
- Katie Callaway as Luke's Intern Christel
- Jessy Schram as Cash Gray
- Derek Hough as Noah West
- Mark Collie as Frankie

=== Guest ===
- Dana Wheeler-Nicholson as Beverly O'Connor
- Eric Close as Teddy Conrad
- Chaley Rose as Zoey Dalton
- Steven Tyler as himself
- Kelly Ripa as herself
- Michael Strahan as himself
- Keann Johnson as himself
- Jay DeMarcus as himself
- Jim Lauderdale as himself
- Kelsea Ballerini as herself
- Mario Lopez as himself
- Charissa Thompson as herself
- Kesha as herself
- Alicia Witt as Autumn Chase
- Thomas Rhett as himself
- Robin Roberts as herself
- Elton John as himself
- Whoopi Goldberg as herself
- Joy Behar as herself
- Raven-Symoné as herself
- Paula Faris as herself
- Deborah Roberts as herself

== Episodes ==
No. overall	No. in season	Title	Directed by	Written by	Original release date	US viewers (millions)
66	1	"Can't Let Go"	Callie Khouri	Meredith Lavender & Marcie Ulin	September 23, 2015	4.91
One month later the premiere begins with Rayna sad and sleeping alone, leading viewers to believe that Deacon has died. It turns out that Deacon is alive. Beverly has had an aneurysm and is in a coma. Meanwhile, Juliette is on top of the world: she has a new album coming out soon, and her new movie is a big hit. Rayna is done with Juliette and officially drops her from Highway 65. Avery has been staying in Ohio with his parents and is hurting, and seriously missing Juliette, when he texts her, she dismisses his message, ignoring him. Jeff is back to lying to Layla, and playing her, only to make money. Back in Nashville, Maddie and Daphne get letters from Teddy who is in jail. Maddie refuses to read hers, while Daphne reads hers and Maddie's, as she clearly misses Teddy. Later that night, at Juliette's concert, she is visited by Steven Tyler who surprises her, and they perform "Crazy" as a duet. She also is visited by Rayna, who tries to help her, but is only yelled at by Juliette, and kicked out. Avery's parents offer to have him move to Ohio with them, which he later declines, saying Nashville is where his home is. Kevin and Will try to have a nice night out, but Will is getting yelled at by woman he has slept with, and can't take the pressure of being in the public eye. Meanwhile, Gunnar and Scarlett try to record together, but end up kissing each other, only for Scarlett to leave, saying she loves Caleb, and she records her part of their music by herself. While this is all happening, Beverly wakes up, with Deacon by her side. At Rayna's house, Maddie comes down to find Daphne reading her letter from Teddy, they end up fighting with Maddie telling Daphne that Teddy is not innocent. As this happens, Deacon comes in and tries to break up the fight, only for Daphne to yell at him, saying that he is not her dad. She clearly misses Teddy and feels left out. While Juliette is out partying, she runs into Layla, where she tells her that Jeff does not love her, and only cares about her, leaving Layla sad. On Rayna's way home, she googles herself, much to find out that her label is a flop, just like Juliette had said, and that she is not having good luck at all with her label. Avery moves in with Will, and Gunnar, along with Cadence. Scarlett sees Caleb and tells him that she loves him, and Juliette is shown missing Avery and Cadence, while looking at pictures of them. Songs: "Hymn for Her" (sung by Deacon); "Love is Your Name" (sung by Steven Tyler); "Crazy" (sung by Juliette and Steven Tyler); "Wake Up When It's Over" (sung by Gunnar and Scarlett)
67	2	"'Til the Pain Outwears the Shame"	Jean de Segonzac	David Gould	September 30, 2015	4.72
Juliette appears on Live with Kelly and Michael to promote her new movie and album. When they show a picture of her, Avery and Cadence she starts to tear up. Luke meets with a PR adviser Gabriella Manning to deal with the whole Will coming out situation. In efforts to save her label Rayna tries to find a big name artist. After getting the photos back from their album photo shoot Gunnar is not pleased when he sees that the photo has been photoshopped to make it look as if he and Scarlett are standing up close to each other. He knows that Scarlett won't like it either but she does end up liking it. Jeff goes to Avery and tells him to go see Juliette. The two end up going home to talk and reconnect. Rayna wants to meets with a big named rocker named Markus Keen who's looking for a new label. Bucky doesn't think it will work because he's a rock artist. She later happens to be seated next to him on a flight to New York. Over the course of the flight she smooth talks him about switching over to country, with his music he can be heard and also sign with her. Deacon spends time with his sister in the hospital, Layla performs at the Bluebird, Daphne overhears some girls talking about Teddy and as well as making fun of her and Maddie. Juliette leaves town without informing Avery and leaves her phone at home, on the jet Jeff gives her a new phone. She asks that no one has the number to it, he doesn't know why she is doing all this and she tells him, "You got all your red carpet photos, right". Luke drops Will from his label, which was he was told to do by Gabriella. Markus signs with Highway 65. Songs: "Rockin and Rollin" (sung by Maddie and Daphne); "What If It's You?" (sung by Juliette); "Makes No Sense at All" (sung by Layla)
68	3	"How Can I Help You Say Goodbye?"	Stephen Cragg	Debra Fordham	October 7, 2015	4.36
Beverly is not doing well. Juliette comes back to a room of passed out people, alone. Daphne has been suspended for getting in a fist fight with another girl. Avery has been calling everyone, and anyone, but he can't find Juliette. Luke and Juliette are on a tour break, and decide to go spend time together. Beverly is now brain dead, with a slim chance of recovery. Deacon wants to keep Beverly on life support, but it is up to Scarlett. Deacon and Scarlett decide to do a test to see if Beverly can breathe on her own. Daphne got into a fight because kids are saying that Teddy is a criminal, but she thinks he isn't. Avery gives Emily Cadence for the day, while he takes care of business. Luke takes Juliette to a race track and she takes him to a bar where they perform before an excited crowd. Will has lunch with Kevin, and his friends. Rayna wants Teddy to see the kids, as they can not take it anymore. They try to see if Beverly can breathe, but unfortunately she can't, causing Scarlett to break down, and Deacon to freak out, both thinking Beverly is alive. Avery files for divorce against Juliette. Avery wants full custody of Cadence, his lawyer says it will be hard, and that Juliette will fight it, but Avery knows she won't. Rayna takes the kids to see Teddy, where Daphne is happy to see him, but Maddie is not. Daphne asks Teddy if he really did those things, and he has to tell her he did. She says she hates him and runs away. Rayna is horrified to find Maddie and Daphne ripping up all the pictures of them with Teddy. Kevin's friends criticize Will for hiding since he came out. Scarlett sings "Speak to Me," the beautiful opposite of "Black Roses." Gunnar shows up and comforts her. Juliette cannot stop the crazy partying. Scarlett tells Gunnar she regrets that she always hated her mother, and now it is too late. Kevin tells Will that he could be a good advocate for the gay community, and that he is doing nothing. Emily sees Avery's divorce papers, and tells him that no matter what it looks like, Juliette wanted Cadence, and she wanted Avery, so make no mistake. Scarlett tells Deacon that she has made the decision to take Beverly off life support, upsetting him, because he feels responsible for killing her. Will tells Kevin he is scared and doesn't know what to do yet. Rayna takes the girls to see Teddy again, where she thanks him for being a good person, husband, and dad. Daphne and Maddie forgive him, and hug him. Teddy says he will plead guilty. Avery stops signing the divorce papers and puts them away. Scarlett says her final words to Beverly and takes her off life support. Back at home, Deacon starts making Scarlett's room up nice, but is overcome with weeping. Songs: "Beyond the Sun" (sung by Maddie); "Bad Reputation" (sung by Juliette and Luke); "Speak to Me" (sung by Scarlett)
69	4	"The Slender Threads That Bind Us Here"	Joanna Kerns	Monica Macer	October 14, 2015	4.54
Everybody comes together for Beverly's funeral. Deacon breaks down during the eulogy, so Rayna takes over for him. Zoey comes back to town in order to support Scarlett at the funeral. At the end of the ceremony, Markus Keen calls Rayna to tell her that he is on his way to Nashville and is ready to work. While Avery relieves Emily from babysitting Cadence in the park, the paparazzi takes pictures of the three of them together. Deacon is having a hard time coping with the death of his sister, and he goes to an AA meeting to see if it will help him deal with the pain of losing Beverly; he instead decides to leave. Caleb asks Gunnar to help him finish a song that he wrote for Scarlett as a way to better communicate with her. The tabloids take notice of the pictures the paparazzi took of Avery and Emily, referring to Emily as Avery's "mystery woman." Juliette catches wind of it and calls Emily a "gold-digging backstabbing whore." Due to Juliette's schedule, she demands drugs to make her feel nothing. Avery meets with Markus in hopes of working with him, and Markus invites him to be the producer of his next album. Before Rayna begins her set at the Opry, she takes time to introduce Layla onstage but is interrupted when Markus decides to join them on stage and introduce himself as Highway 65's new artist, stealing Layla's thunder. Cadence is rushed to the hospital with a 104° temperature and Avery is desperate to get in touch with Juliette, but because she is knocked out on drugs, he is told she doesn't care about Cadence. Songs: "Take My Hand Precious Lord" (sung by Zoey); "Mess Worth Making" (sung by Layla); "I Want To Do (Everything For You)" (sung by Rayna and Markus); "Count on Me" (sung by Gunnar)
70	5	"Stop the World (And Let Me Off)"	Jan Eliasberg	Meredith Lavender & Marcie Ulin	October 21, 2015	4.47
Rayna sends Maddie to Atlanta with Colt and Luke to see Juliette and Luke perform. Scarlett goes back to her mom's home in Mississippi to sort out her belongings, thinking that she will be doing this alone; instead, Deacon appears. The two have flashbacks of their memories of Beverly. Scarlett has a meltdown and leaves after Deacon reprimands her for ending her mother's life. The two later end up reconciling, and Deacon apologizes for not being there when Scarlett had to make the tough decision to pull the plug. At the arena, Maddie spends time with Juliette and is invited onstage to sing with her, knowing that both Luke and Rayna would not be pleased. He confronts Juliette, saying that she knows how upset Rayna will be when she find this out, adding that she shouldn't "try to play 'cool mom' with someone else's kid" just because she had abandoned her own. In addition to spending time with Juliette, Maddie spends some alone time with Colt and decides that the two of them are ready to have sex. Avery begins to work with Markus, but tension builds when Markus fires him for "talking on the phone like a girl" and not "getting" his vision. Rayna works with Layla on her album, talks about her relationship with Jeff, and apologizes for Markus' interruption at the Opry. Jeff campaigns to be the CEO of Luke's label. Juliette can't believe that she actually thought that something was going on between Avery and Emily. She apologizes to Emily and is on her way back to Nashville when she finds out that Cadence went to the hospital. Before she has a chance to leave, she runs into Avery who informs her that he wants a divorce and full custody of the baby. Songs: "Telescope" (sung by Juliette and Maddie); "Spinning Revolver" (sung by Will and Kevin); "Can't Stop a Heart" (sung by Layla)
71	6	"Please Help Me, I'm Fallin'"	Callie Khouri	Taylor Hamra	October 28, 2015	4.18
Juliette is miserable over Avery divorcing her, but agrees to everything. Rayna is upset with Maddie and grounds her. Markus, acting like a jerk as usual, demands that Rayna produce his record. Juliette, in a depressed haze, attacks a fan. She drinks a bottle of vodka, and gets really drunk, later trying to make a pass at Jeff. Disgusted, he tells her that it's no wonder Avery left her. Jeff tells Gabriella that he can spin Juliette's earlier outburst towards her fan, making it look good for the press. But in exchange, he wants to be the CEO of Luke's label. Rayna tries to work with Markus, and help change his sound, but he begins to act like a jerk, and storms off saying that the whole thing was a mistake. Jeff asks Layla to move in with him. Deacon goes to see a tribute to Beverly at The Landslide, a bar where she used to sing. Markus says that Rayna needed him to help her label, but she says that is true, but he needed her, due to his attitude. Daphne doesn't want to sing because of the bad things people said about her recently. Scarlett is making sure everything in Beverly's house is packed, when she finds dozens of rejection letters from record labels. Will performs on stage again, but is shaken by the new addition of men in the audience. Avery is worried about Juliette. Juliette is seen taking pills and downing them with alcohol. Gunnar wants a relationship with the girl he met in Atlanta, but she doesn't. Markus says he gets Rayna's version of his song now, and likes it. Avery is really scared for Juliette, and goes to see Glenn. Glenn tells him he is worried for Juliette, but she doesn't care about herself, and that Avery should cut himself off emotionally. Scarlett ends up going to Beverly's tribute event at The Landslide, and hears that Beverly would always brag about her. Jeff gets the CEO job of Luke's label. Will tells Kevin he wishes that he didn't come out, only for Kevin to break up with him. Scarlett sings Beverly's song "Curtain Call." Deacon finally makes peace with Beverly's death and calls up his friend Frankie, offering to buy in at his bar if they can rename it The Beverly. Colt gets drunk at Luke's party, and goes to get some air. Juliette texts Avery and says she is sorry, and goes to kill herself. Jeff sees Juliette stumbling around outside, and goes after her. He follows her up to the roof. Just as Juliette begins to step over the edge, Jeff lunges forward and saves her, but is thrown off balance and plunges to his death. Songs: "In the Name of Your Love" (sung by Markus); "Run With Me" (sung by Will); "Curtain Call" (sung by Scarlett)
72	7	"Can't Get Used to Losing You"	Eric Close	Dana Greenblatt	November 11, 2015	4.55
The morning after Jeff falls off the roof, everyone finds out. A hung over Juliette wakes up to the cops knocking on her door to tell her about him. They ask her questions. Deacon shows Rayna his new bar. Jeff's family won't acknowledge Layla or invite her to the funeral. Colt tells Luke that he saw Juliette on the ledge of the roof and Jeff saving her which resulted in his death. When the reporters ask Juliette how she feels she says "How do you think I feel?" and says that he committed suicide. Luke and Gabriella get on her for saying that, calling it a conspiracy. She tells them she just told them what the police told her. Luke tells her that someone spotted her on the rooftop, to which she replies that she was in her room. Rayna gets worried about Layla and Deacon. Things get awkward with Avery when he looks for a new place to live. The agent has no idea about his split from Juliette and she asks if the place is for the two of them. Rayna and Deacon get into an argument about him, a recovering alcoholic, running a bar. She isn't too sure about it. Luke tells Colt that Juliette was in her room not on the roof when Jeff fell. Right before Juliette goes on stage in Nashville she remembers what happened to Jeff. She doesn't go on stage and goes back to her dressing room. Layla takes her place and pays tribute to Jeff. Juliette admits to Luke that she had been drunkenly going to kill herself and that Jeff died while saving her. Rayna goes to support Deacon at his bar. Colt is not pleased when his father warns to not tell anyone the reason why Jeff died. Juliette goes to rehab. Songs: "Holding on to What I Can't Hold" (sung by Frankie); "Like New" (sung by Deacon); "Lullaby (Sleep Tonight)" (sung by Avery and Will); "Too Far From You" (sung by Layla);
73	8	"Unguarded Moments"	Ron Underwood	Paul Keables	November 18, 2015	4.44
Maddie is going through a rough patch, dying her hair, and being rude to everyone. Markus' album is going really well. Scarlett and Gunnar are out on tour, but Scarlett feels Gunnar only cares about seeing Erin. Colt is now having trust issues with Luke, as he wants him to tell the truth. Maddie gets offered a deal from Sony, but Rayna does not want to let her take it. Avery has no money, so he is stuck recording guitar music for jingles. Will has been acting really weird since he and Kevin broke up. Deacon is focusing all his attention on the bar and won't help Rayna take care of Maddie. Gunnar continues to only care about being 'intimate' with Erin. Luke is feeling like everything that has happened, Juliette going crazy, Jeff dying, and Colt not trusting him, is all his fault. Gunnar is missing meet-and-greets to have 'fun' with Erin. Luke and Gabriella decide to start dating. Caleb and Scarlett are having trouble finding time to talk. Scarlett does not like Erin, so during her performance, she keeps telling Erin to raise her vocals, but Erin accidentally causes a power outage, ruining the performance. Will plays his song about Kevin to Avery, and Avery tells him that people should hear it, and that he should play it. Rayna and Markus connect and talk about life and Maddie, and have a moment. Daphne hears about Maddie's solo deal, and is sad that they didn't want her, telling Maddie nobody needs her. Deacon continues trying to get his bar up and running. Gunnar and Erin have a fight, with Gunnar telling Erin it was her fault. Rayna tells Deacon that she needs his help in raising her kids, Deacon says he does not want to mess up. Luke begins to tell Colt everything, to try to regain his trust. Will can't stand to see Avery perform his song, so he goes home. While Avery is performing, he keeps thinking of Juliette and how much he misses her. Rayna and Deacon have a family discussion, and tell Maddie and Daphne that Rayna will sign them to Highway 65. Will is offered a publishing deal. Maddie tells Daphne Rayna only signed them to keep Maddie under control. Deacon sees a message on Rayna's phone from Markus, saying "I hope I helped you," which leads Deacon to believe something happened. Songs: "All I Want is Us Tonight" (sung by Markus); "Plenty Far to Fall" (sung by Scarlett and Gunnar); "History of My Heart" (sung by Avery)
74	9	"Three's a Crowd"	Mike Listo	Geoffrey Nauffts	December 2, 2015	4.17
Rayna has to go in the studio to work with Markus. While the two try to pick out a new song for Markus to record Deacon walks in. Markus asks Deacon if he can record one of his songs. One of The Exes' shows in Charlotte was canceled so Scarlett flies to Nashville to spend time with Caleb for the day. The song of Will's that Avery sang at the Bluebird is put on hold by singer Wade Cole. He wants to work with Will but Will isn't so sure about this because he was the guy at Juliette's CD release party who didn't want his picture taken with Will. Luke tells Gabriella to push back some things so he can spend time Colt. While the two are fishing Gabriella surprises them, and Luke notices a camera man. He asks her about the camera man, and she informs him about his Forbes magazine shoot. Colt huffs in disappointment, and Luke tells him that he didn't plan on this. Avery tries to find work to pay the bills. Daphne tries out different looks and styles for her and Maddie's photo shoot but Maddie keeps on criticizing and making fun of her. Will googles "Wade Cole anti gay" and finds out how Wade really is and how anti gay him and his wife are. Because of all this he isn't so sure that he wants Wade to record his song. Avery tells him to let Wade record it because it can make or break his career. Markus changes some of the words to Deacon's song which doesn't make him happy but lets him keep it that way. After Deacon tells Rayna that he thinks Markus wants to sleep with her, Rayna goes to Markus just to make it clear that Deacon is her guy. Colt leaves his dad to go live with his granddad. Juliette calls Emily. Songs: "Only Tennessee" (sung by Scarlett); "Don't Make 'Em Like You No More" (sung by Markus); "Kissin' and Huggin'" (sung by Gunnar);
75	10	"We've Got Nothing But Love to Prove"	Arlene Sanford	Debra Fordham	December 9, 2015	4.14
The IRS informs Luke that his business manager has embezzled money from him and that he also owes forty million in back taxes. Emily visited Juliette in rehab and tells Avery that she has entered treatment for postpartum depression. Avery tells her that Juliette is just using her to get to him. Deacon shows Scarlett the ring he will use to propose to Rayna. As Markus' album is about to be released, he starts to second guess himself. Avery doesn't want Juliette anywhere near Cadence. Caleb gets an offer to be the head of his own department in Seattle but he is going to turn it down to stay with Scarlett in Nashville. Markus kisses Rayna but she quickly pushes him away and reminds that nothing can happen between them. Boulevard is getting back together so Markus has canceled his tour and is going to move to LA. Luke throws blame at Gabriella for all his problems but she tells him no and quits. Emily wants Avery to visit Juliette so he can see that she has changed. He doesn't believe that anything has changed about her, she is just acting. Over at Wade's house, it is revealed that Wade is gay when he puts the moves on Will. Rayna has no luck of changing Markus' mind so her label is now dead. Scarlett makes the decision to break up with Caleb so he can go to Seattle. Deacon confesses to Rayna that he was jealous of her working with Markus. He proposes to her and she says yes. Songs: "'Til the Stars Come Out Again" (sung by Daphne); "Tonight Feels Different" (sung by Markus); "Hand to Hold" (sung by Deacon and Scarlett);
76	11	"Forever and for Always"	Stephen Cragg	Monica Macer & Dana Greenblatt	March 16, 2016	4.22
Rayna and Deacon's wedding day is finally here and they plan to get married at Rayna's late mother's country property. While leaving the rehearsal dinner at the Bluebird, Rayna, Deacon, Tandy and the girls are bombarded by the paparazzi. When one of them asks Maddie which dad is worse, Deacon pushes him to the ground along with his camera. Things take a turn when the wedding planner reveals that the florist leaked the location of the wedding. Fortunately she knows of a place where they can relocate, out of the public eye. Emily returns from visiting Juliette with Cadence and gives Avery notes to look over on what to say when people ask about Juliette's absence from the wedding. Will's publishing deal is finished when Wade Cole put the word out that Will is difficult to work with. Maddie is concerned about her parents getting married, because sometimes Deacon can be violent as seen the night before at the Bluebird. Daphne has her reservations about the marriage too, as she's worried about being the odd one out. Deacon feels that Maddie thinks he's a monster so he drives off. Tandy expresses that she has concerns about Deacon but Rayna tells her nothing is going to stop her from marrying him. Colt confesses the truth to Layla how Jeff really died. Rayna assures both of the girls that there is nothing to worry about and that they are a family so nothing is going to tear that apart, and Deacon loves them both more than anything. As the wedding is about to start the wedding planner says that Deacon hasn't been answering his phone and offers to make an announcement. Right then when Rayna isn't sure what to do, Deacon arrives. The two say their "I Do's." At the reception Layla asks Avery about Juliette. Later on she meets with Glenn about asking him to be her manager and if Avery can be her producer. Songs: "All We Ever Wanted" (sung by Maddie and Daphne); "When the Right One Comes Along (Wedding Strings Version)" (sung by Scarlett and Gunnar); "From Here on Out" (sung by Deacon)
77	12	"How Does It Feel to be Free?"	Steve Robin	Ben St. John & Mollie Bickley St. John	March 23, 2016	4.10
Avery tries to visit Juliette but is denied due to her emotional fragility and she doesn't need any drama. He goes to work with Layla on her album, and confides in her where Juliette is. Juliette is given twenty-four hours to go public with the divorce if not Avery will. She eventually does makes the announcement. A woman named Vita shows up at The Beverly wanting to sing, Deacon is so impressed that he has Rayna come down and listen for herself. Rayna wants to sign her but Vita would rather sing and work at The Beverly because she needs a job. Vita is filling out the application but runs out when she sees the felony question. Rayna finds her living in car where Vita tells her that she has done some things that she's not proud of but isn't that girl anymore, Rayna encourages her to go back. Deacon convinces his business partner Frankie to give her another shot, but Frankie is still not sure about her. At the end of her shift, Frankie discovers that $500 is missing and is pretty sure that Vita took it. Scarlett sees Erin kissing another guy, tells Gunnar, where he then confronts Erin about it and breaks up with her. While singing on stage Will's performance is cut short by a guy who keeps yelling gay slurs and throws a beer bottle at him. Luke gets backlash from his fans because of his tax problems, accusing him of not being a "real" country guy anymore. His troubles are also hurting his tour so he gets his old friend Riff out of retirement to tour with him. Songs: "Down the Line" (sung by Vita); "Swept Away" (sung by Maddie and Jessie); "Ain't it Beautiful" (sung by Will)
78	13	"If I Could Do It All Again"	Callie Khouri	Sibyl Gardner	March 30, 2016	3.84
To prepare for the tour Riff is scheduled to perform at The Beverly as a warm up show but things don't go smoothly when he rehearses with Luke's band. He's rusty after all the years of not performing. After lying to Rayna about not stealing the $500, Vita confesses to her that she did steal it. She needed it to help her sister and was going to pay it back. Maddie breaks up with Colt, and is treating Daphne unkindly when she starts hanging out with Frankie's daughter Cash more. Out at the park Avery starts talking to another single parent, they get to know each other, and she invites him over to her house for dinner. Will gets on an offer from a label where all the artists are gay, and is hesitant about it. The head of the label hasn't heard Will's music before but they're looking for a country artist and is guarantee his music will sell crazy with their demographic. Will passes because he doesn't want to be pigeonholed like that and only wants to be known as a country artist who happens to be gay. He comes across a barista who independently released her own music so he thinks that may be the best route for him. Frankie loses his sobriety when Deacon gets credit for the bar's success. Rayna goes to see Vita but walks up to see police tape all around her car with everything instead destroyed. Songs: "The Rubble" (sung by Scarlett and Gunnar); "This Old Guitar" (sung by Vita); "If You Don't Mean Business" (sung by Jessie); "Both Hands on the Wheel" (sung by Riff)
79	14	"What I Cannot Change"	Lily Mariye	Taylor Hamra	April 6, 2016	4.04
Juliette gets the okay to leave the treatment facility and go back home to Nashville. As soon as she gets home she has an offer for a cameo in a Steven Spielberg movie which she has to decide on. If she takes it she'll have to be in Prague for two weeks filming it. Rayna holds a showcase for Layla to help her album get played on radio. Colt asks Luke to sign a waiver for him to join the Army, Luke tells him no because he his terrified that something will happen to him. They talk and Luke eventually agrees to let him join. Juliette surprises Avery, and asks if she can spend more time with Cadence now that she's home. He says no because he doesn't quite trust her yet. Juliette agrees to do the movie but during her press conference she changes her mind so she can spend more time with her daughter. Avery gives her more time to spend with Cadence. Frankie starts drinking again but still celebrates his 15th anniversary of being sober. During his set at the bar he is completely wasted. Deacon tells Cash to leave and pulls Frankie off stage when he starts to get worse. Frankie goes back to AA and starts back at Day 1. Rayna is worried about Vita's whereabouts and is getting no help from the police. When Will demands that Luke release his songs, Luke offers to sign him back at his label. Layla has the chance to open for Autumn Chase, a big name artist, but Autumn eventually decides to go with The Exes after hearing them perform. Songs: "Mess Worth Making" (sung by Layla); "The Book" (sung by Layla); "My Heart Don't Know When to Stop" (sung by Layla); "I'm Coming Over" (sung by Scarlett and Gunnar); "If I Could Forgive Myself" (sung by Juliette)
80	15	"When There's a Fire in Your Heart"	Michael Lohmann	Meredith Lavender & Marcie Ulin	April 13, 2016	4.12
Maddie gets the idea to sneak out and play at cafe after hearing that Cash used to do that. She lies to Deacon and says that she's going to see Cash play. The Exes prepare for their first show with Autumn Chase. Since there are no tours for Layla to go out on, Rayna suggests that she'll start up her own tour so Layla can open for her. Juliette doesn't know how she can get back into music without Glenn's help and asks if he can manage her again but he tells her no, and to start over somewhere fresh. Will starts writing with Kevin again. Layla begs Luke to let her open for him; Bucky informs Rayna about it and she feels gut punched. Avery tells Glenn to come out to the Opry to see a new act to possibly sign, but it's actually Juliette. They trick him to go see her perform. After talking he agrees to manage her again and has also missed her. Daphne accidentally let it slip about Maddie performing at a club. Deacon shows up while she's performing and goes off when a guy goes up and touches her leg. Deacon and Cash get into an argument about Maddie, and he tells her to stay away from Maddie. Layla asks Avery to be her music director and go out on the road with her. The night before Luke's tour starts, Riff's wife informs Luke that Riff has left home and doesn't know where he is. Songs: "Hole in the World" (sung by Juliette); "Wild Card" (sung by Maddie); "Take Mine" (sung by Rayna and Autumn); "" (sung by);
81	16	"Didn't Expect It to Go Down This Way"	Mike Listo	Paul Keables	April 20, 2016	3.71
When Rayna goes to wake up Maddie to talk about the night before, she's not there and sees her window open. Avery tells Juliette that he plans on taking Cadence on the road with him on Luke's tour, Juliette suggests that Emily should tag along with them to help take care of the baby. Rayna goes to Cash's to see if Maddie is there and doesn't leave happy. When Rayna drives off Cash tells Maddie that she can come out from hiding from her mother. Riff was found in a hospital in New Orleans so his wife and Luke go down there to see him. Turns out he had a brain hemorrhage, and multiple substances were found in his body. An escort was the one who brought him to the hospital. Jealousy hits Juliette when she sees Layla and Avery rehearsing. Things are going well for The Exes as radio is eating up their new single. Since Riff can't perform, Thomas Rhett fills in for him. Autumn hits on Gunnar. Avery, Layla and Glenn are in shock when Juliette announces during Luke's show that she is going to replace Riff on tour. Rayna and Deacon find out where Maddie is. They go to bring her home where she informs them that she is going to emancipate herself because they are keeping her away from a career. She also finally discovers that Edgehill had wanted to sign her awhile back. Songs: "Moving On Never Felt So Good" (sung by Will); "The Book" (sung by Avery and Layla); "Can't Say No To Love" (sung by Luke)
82	17	"Baby Come Home"	Jet Wilkinson	David Gould	April 27, 2016	3.77
Juliette asks if there is anything going on between Avery and Layla. Glenn tells her no, they're just working on her album together. While listening over Layla's music Layla and Avery kiss but are soon interrupted by Cadence. Rayna is served papers for Maddie's emancipation hearing. Since Deacon is not her legal father he is not named in the court order but Teddy is. When Maddie visits her father he tells her the real reason why she had the offer from Edgehill, Jeff was blackmailing him. He has to reveal about the escort he was seeing. Rayna has a talk with Cash and warns her that she can get anybody in Nashville not to work with her. Juliette wants to get back together with Avery, but he wants to move on from her and hates that she is on the tour. Avery shows up at Layla's hotel room to sleep with her, Scarlett and Gunnar get back together after spending part of the day stuck in an elevator. At the last minute Maddie shows up to a play a song with Daphne at a benefit at the Ryman. When they finish, it is presumed that Maddie has changed her mind about leaving home but she hasn't. Her family is devastated, especially Daphne. Songs: "One Place Too Long" (sung by Juliette); "Caged Bird" (sung by Layla); "Willing Heart" (sung by Maddie and Daphne); "Hold on To Me" (sung by Rayna)
83	18	"The Trouble with the Truth"	Michael Lohmann	Valerie Chu	May 4, 2016	3.89
Juliette is nominated for an Oscar for Shenandoah Girl. She finds out about Avery spending the night with Layla. Avery wants to attempt a relationship with Layla. At Maddie's emancipation hearing, her lawyer reveals Deacon's violent, alcoholic past. The details were provided by Frankie, who was Deacon's AA sponsor, to Cash. The lawyer cites concerns for Maddie's safety if she is not emancipated. Deacon confronts Frankie behind the bar and Frankie punches Deacon. The two end up getting in a fight which leaves Frankie all bloody, and as onlookers arrive, Frankie accuses Deacon of trying to kill him. Deacon ends up in jail, and Rayna tells him that Frankie and Cash have taken out a restraining order against them. As a result of this apparent confirmation of Deacon's tendency towards violence, Maddie is granted emancipation. Juliette confesses to Layla about the night Jeff died while saving her, but Layla says that nothing has changed between them. Luke goes on a conservative television channel to defend Will but the feed gets dropped. While at home, Will hears noises from outside; when he goes to check on them, he discovers that his truck has been vandalized with homophobic slurs. Songs: "Boomtown" (sung by Juliette and Luke)
84	19	"After You've Gone"	Bethany Rooney	Debra Fordham	May 11, 2016	3.94
A week has passed since the emancipation hearing, and Rayna has heard that Cash has set up a showcase for Maddie. Will goes back home for his mother's funeral where his father says that he is no longer his son, and he had also cut Will out of family photos. Layla and Avery try to figure out how to work out their relationship while being in the public eye. Scarlett gets an offer to be in a headphone commercial featuring female artists and Gunnar gets jealous. Deacon visits Frankie to apologize, but Frankie informs him that he is going to buy him out of the bar and change the name of The Beverly. Juliette reunites with Noah West at the premiere of Shenandoah Girl, Daphne wonders why her mom only worries about Maddie and isn't worried about Daphne too. Rayna sneaks into Maddie's showcase and sees where she made her stage name 'Maddie Jaymes'. Luke is pressured to drop Will when radio stations stop playing his music, but Luke doesn't. He says he is on the right side of history. When Will leaves his home his dad stands up for him when a guy calls him a homo. Cash wants Maddie to leave Nashville so there will be no connections with Rayna. Maddie signs with a label based in New York. Songs: "Strong Tonight" (sung by Rayna); "Kinda Dig the Feeling" (sung by Avery)
85	20	"It's Sure Gonna Hurt"	Mike Listo	Taylor Hamra	May 18, 2016	3.72
Rayna and Deacon go to couples therapy to talk about their problems, and the therapist asks is they can forgive each other and forget the past. Luke appears on The View to talk about Will. Some fellow recruits beat up Colt because of his dad defending Will. Colt's grandfather blames Luke for this but Colt says he was standing up for his father. Autumn happens to be friends with Elton John and invites Gunnar to go with her to Elton's concert in Boston. Elton invites Gunnar to sing with him onstage. As the two get closer Scarlett realizes that she is still in love with him. Noah meets Cadence when he comes to stay with Juliette which doesn't sit well with Avery. At Layla's album release part Avery's mind keeps drifting to Juliette, and he keeps checking his phone to see if she has called him. This and Rayna missing her album release party makes Layla unhappy. Some guy shows up at Will's to thank Will for helping him come to terms with his own sexuality. Will decides he wants to face Cynthia Davis face to face. Songs: "Plenty Far To Fall" (sung by Scarlett and Gunnar); "Soul Survivor" (sung by Layla and Avery); "Blue Wonderful" (sung by Elton John)
86	21	"Maybe You'll Appreciate Me Someday"	Callie Khouri	Meredith Lavender & Marcie Ulin	May 25, 2016	4.19
Rayna's performance at the Foster Care benefit concert has sold out. She and Deacon are still really missing Maddie who is meeting with Vince Pierce to produce her album. Rayna is worried about Maddie being involved with Vince because Vince tried to force himself on her when she was Maddy's age. Maddie and Cash go to a party at Vince's house and when Maddie tries to leave, he gets violent with her. Deacon saves her. Colt and Luke are trying to get Will on Cynthia Davis' show to challenge her. Avery tells Layla about Juliette wanting to see Cadence, but Layla does not like this so she leaks the information about Jeff's death to the press and then tips off Jeff's sister. Scarlett tells Gunnar she loves him but Autumn wants Gunnar to go solo and they decide to break up. Jeff's sister is suing Juliette for wrongful death. The Exes decide to break up. Avery confronts Layla about her lying and dumps her. Daphne is missing Maddie. Rayna and Daphne perform at the benefit together. Juliette goes to the press room, and confesses everything from her depression to her attempted suicide and Jeff is hailed a hero. She and Avery get to talking, as Juliette makes peace with possibly losing everything, Avery tells her that he and Cadence are still here for her. Juliette bails on the Oscars to go home and reunite with her family. Maddie comes home to Rayna and Deacon, having been rescued by Deacon. Scarlett and Gunnar perform together and kiss, getting back together personally and professionally, but with Autumn noting they are fired. Will and Kevin get back together. Luke calls his daughter and asks to talk to his ex-wife, hinting at a reunion. Bucky tells Layla that her career is about to blow up as she is the next Cumulus Artist of the Month. While Avery is waiting for Juliette at the airport, he is told that Juliette's plane sent out a distress signal 90 miles away from Nashville and is missing. Songs: "Brothers" (sung by Will and Luke); "Together We Stand" (sung by Rayna and Daphne); "Love You Home" (sung by Scarlett and Gunnar)

== U.S. ratings ==
No.	Title	Air date	Rating/share (18–49)	Viewers (millions)	DVR (18–49)	DVR viewers (millions)	Total (18–49)	Total viewers (millions)
1	"Can't Let Go"	September 23, 2015	1.2/4	4.91	1.0	2.63	2.2	7.54
2	"Til the Pain Outwears the Shame"	September 30, 2015	1.1/4	4.72	0.9	2.25	2.0	6.97
3	"How Can I Help You Say Goodbye"	October 7, 2015	1.0/3	4.36	1.0	2.43	2.0	6.79
4	"The Slender Threads That Bind Us Here"	October 14, 2015	1.1/4	4.54	1.0	2.44	2.1	6.98
5	"Stop the World (And Let Me Off)"	October 21, 2015	1.1/3	4.47	0.9	2.32	2.0	6.80
6	"Please Help Me, I'm Fallin'"	October 28, 2015	1.1/3	4.18	0.9	2.60	2.0	6.78
7	"Can't Get Used to Losing You"	November 11, 2015	1.0/3	4.55	0.9	2.38	1.9	6.93
8	"Unguarded Moments"	November 18, 2015	1.0/3	4.44	0.9	2.27	1.9	6.70
9	"Three's A Crowd"	December 2, 2015	0.9/3	4.17	0.9	2.57	1.8	6.74
10	"We've Got Nothing But Love To Prove"	December 9, 2015	0.8/3	4.14	1.0	2.45	1.8	6.59
11	"Forever and for Always"	March 16, 2016	0.9/3	4.22	0.8	2.39	1.7	6.61
12	"How Does it Feel to be Free"	March 23, 2016	0.9/3	4.10	0.8	2.44	1.7	6.38
13	"If I Could Do It All Again"	March 30, 2016	0.9/3	3.84	0.6	2.17	1.5	5.99
14	"What I Cannot Change"	April 6, 2016	0.9/3	4.04	0.8	2.31	1.7	6.36
15	"When There's a Fire in Your Heart"	April 13, 2016	0.9/3	4.12	0.8	2.31	1.7	6.36
16	"Didn't Expect It to Go Down This Way"	April 20, 2016	0.8/3	3.71	0.7	2.17	1.5	5.87
17	"Baby Come Home"	April 27, 2016	0.8/3	3.77	0.8	2.29	1.6	6.00
18	"The Trouble with the Truth"	May 4, 2016	0.8/3	3.89	0.8	2.16	1.6	6.05
19	"After You've Gone"	May 11, 2016	0.9/3	3.94	0.8	2.22	1.6	6.16
20	"It's Sure Gonna Hurt"	May 18, 2016	0.8/3	3.72	0.7	2.18	1.5	5.90
21	"Maybe You'll Appreciate Me Someday"	May 25, 2016	0.9/3	4.19	0.8	2.18	1.7	6.37
