= Exes =

Exes may also refer to:

- "Exes", a 2016 song on Hymns (Bloc Party album)
- "Exes" (song), 2023 song by Tate McRae
- The Exes, a U.S. television series (2011–2015)
- Plural of ex (relationship), former spouses etc.

== Fictional characters ==
- The Exes (band), a duo on the U.S. television series Nashville (2012–2018)

== See also ==
- The X's
