= Nashville season 1 =

2012–2013 season of American TV series

Nashville
- Season 1
- Season 1 DVD cover
- Starring: Connie Britton; Hayden Panettiere; Clare Bowen; Eric Close; Charles Esten; Jonathan Jackson; Sam Palladio; Robert Wisdom; Powers Boothe
- No. of episodes: 21

Release
- Original network: ABC
- Original release: October 10, 2012 – May 22, 2013

Season chronology
- Next → Season 2

The first season of the American television musical drama series Nashville premiered on October 10, 2012 and concluded on May 22, 2013 on ABC. The series was created by Academy Award winner Callie Khouri and produced by R.J. Cutler, Khouri, Dee Johnson, Steve Buchanan and Connie Britton. The series stars Connie Britton as Rayna Jaymes, a legendary country music superstar whose stardom is beginning to fade, and Hayden Panettiere as rising star Juliette Barnes.

The episodes, except for the pilot, are named after Hank Williams songs.

== Cast ==
=== Regular cast ===
- Connie Britton as Rayna Jaymes
- Hayden Panettiere as Juliette Barnes
- Clare Bowen as Scarlett O'Connor
- Eric Close as Teddy Conrad
- Charles Esten as Deacon Claybourne
- Jonathan Jackson as Avery Barkley
- Sam Palladio as Gunnar Scott
- Robert Wisdom as Coleman Carlisle
- Powers Boothe as Lamar Wyatt

=== Supporting cast ===
Recurring cast

- Judith Hoag as Tandy Wyatt
- Sylvia Jefferies as Jolene Barnes
- Lennon Stella as Maddie Conrad
- Maisy Stella as Daphne Conrad
- Kimberly Williams-Paisley as Peggy Kenter
- Chris Carmack as Will Lexington
- Jay Hernandez as Dante Rivas
- Michiel Huisman as Liam McGuinnis
- Tilky Montgomery Jones as Sean Butler
- Rya Kihlstedt as Marilyn Rhodes
- Susan Misner as Stacy

Background cast

- David Alford as Bucky Dawes
- Ed Amatrudo as Glenn Goodman
- Kourtney Hansen as Emily
- Todd Truley as Marshall Evans
- Chloe Bennet as Hailey
- Nicholas Strong as JT
- Tiffany Morgan as Jeanne Buchanan
- J. Karen Thomas as Audrey Carlisle

=== Guest cast ===
- JD Souther as Watty White
- Wyclef Jean as Dominic King
- Afton Williamson as Makena
- Burgess Jenkins as Randy Roberts
- David Clayton Rogers as Jason Scott
- Yara Martinez as Carmen Gonzalez
- J.J. Rodgers as Deb Butler
- Katie Couric as herself
- Ming-Na Wen as Calista Reeve
- Vince Gill as himself
- Kip Moore as himself
- Dan Auerbach as himself
- Brad Paisley as himself
- Pam Tillis as herself
- Chris Young as himself (cameo)
- Brantley Gilbert as himself (cameo)

== Episodes ==
| No. overall | No. in season | Title | Directed by | Written by | Original release date | US viewers (millions) |
|---|---|---|---|---|---|---|
| 1 | 1 | "Pilot" | R.J. Cutler | Callie Khouri | October 10, 2012 | 8.93 |
Rayna Jaymes is a famous country singer, whose tour is not selling as quickly as she had expected. In order to save money, her record company wants her to be an opening act for up-and-coming singer Juliette Barnes. Rayna's company tells her to either go on tour with Juliette or leave the label. Juliette is revealed to constantly be called on the phone by her mother, who is a drug addict and wants money to feed her drug needs. Juliette records three songs Rayna turned down for her album. Rayna eventually wants them back but it's too late. Meanwhile, Rayna's husband, Teddy Conrad, after a business failure, is frustrated over living on his wife’s income. He accepts an offer to run for mayor of Nashville with help from Rayna's counselman father. Elsewhere, Juliette has a meeting of minds with Deacon, the lead guitarist of Rayna's band who is Rayna's former boyfriend. Elsewhere, Deacon's niece, Scarlett O'Connor, struggles to become a singer in her own right while struggling as a waitress and dealing with her boyfriend Avery. Songs: "Back Home" (sung by Deacon); "It's My Life" (sung by Rayna); "Love Like Mine" (sung by Juliette); "If I Didn't Know Better" (sung by Scarlett and Gunnar); "Already Gone" (sung by Rayna); "Boys and Buses" (sung by Juliette)
| 2 | 2 | "I Can't Help It (If I'm Still in Love with You)" | R.J. Cutler | Callie Khouri | October 17, 2012 | 6.74 |
As Teddy's campaign continues, Rayna is faced with an investigation that reveals family secrets involving Deacon. Meanwhile, Juliette feels betrayed when she sees Deacon perform with Rayna. Also, Scarlett must decide between her dream of being a country-western singer and her relationship with Avery. Songs: "No One Will Ever Love You" (sung by Deacon and Rayna); "Telescope" (sung by Juliette); "Twist of Barbwire" (sung by Avery); "Undermine" (sung by Juliette and Deacon); "I'll Be There" (sung by Gunnar); "Matchbox Blues" (sung by Deacon);
| 3 | 3 | "Someday You'll Call My Name" | Michael Engler | Liz Tigelaar | October 24, 2012 | 6.54 |
Rayna learns the family is facing financial problems; Juliette asks Deacon to write and tour with her. Songs: "Fade Into You" (sung by Scarlett and Gunnar); "Telescope" (sung by Maddie and Daphne); "I Will Fall" (sung by Scarlett and Gunnar)
| 4 | 4 | "We Live in Two Different Worlds" | Paul McCrane | Todd Ellis Kessler | October 31, 2012 | 5.74 |
The arrival of a woman from Teddy's past tests his marriage; Juliette deals with the fallout surrounding her shoplifting arrest, Rayna and Deacon perform together. Songs: "Changing Ground" (sung by Rayna)
| 5 | 5 | "Move It on Over" | Lesli Linka Glatter | David Marshall Grant | November 7, 2012 | 6.07 |
Rayna thinks about moving on when Deacon sets boundaries in their relationship. Songs: "Buried Under" (sung by Rayna); "Yellin' From the Rooftop" (sung by Juliette); "American Beauty" (sung by Rayna); "Loving You is the Only Way to Fly" (sung by Scarlett and Gunnar); "Sideshow" (sung by Deacon)
| 6 | 6 | "You're Gonna Change (Or I'm Gonna Leave)" | David Petrarca | Meredith Lavender & Marcie Ulin | November 14, 2012 | 5.93 |
Rayna seeks the help of a music producer to change her sound; Juliette attempts to repair her image. Songs: "Kiss" (sung by Avery); "Love Like Mine (Acoustic)" (sung by Juliette)
| 7 | 7 | "Lovesick Blues" | Mimi Leder | Wendy Calhoun | November 28, 2012 | 5.69 |
Marshall pushes for Juliette and Rayna to collaborate at an event; Teddy tells Rayna the truth. Songs: "The Morning of the Rain" (sung by Avery); "In the Arms of a Jealous God" (sung by Rayna); "Wrong Song" (sung by Rayna and Juliette)
| 8 | 8 | "Where He Leads Me" | Wendey Stanzler | Jason George | December 5, 2012 | 5.95 |
Teddy's secrecy about embezzling millions of dollars in the past, and the surfacing of suggestive photographs, leads Rayna to believe he is having an affair. Meanwhile, Scarlett gets an invitation to be a band's lead singer and the song she wrote with Gunnar gets an option contract, prompting a passionate kiss between the two and Gunnar to dump his girlfriend and profess his love to Scarlett. Juliette asks Sean to marry her. Songs: "For Your Glory" (sung by Juliette); "Peace in the Valley" (sung by Avery)
| 9 | 9 | "Be Careful of Stones That You Throw" | Paul McCrane | David Gould | January 9, 2013 | 5.92 |
When Rayna suggests bringing her girls on tour, she learns Lamar is willing to blackmail her; Juliette and Sean's elopement surprises everyone; Deacon reconnects with an ex; Avery follows a music producer's advice. Songs: "Twist of Barbwire" (sung by Scarlett); "Change Your Mind" (sung by Scarlett and Gunnar)
| 10 | 10 | "I'm Sorry for You My Friend" | Sanaa Hamri | Dana Greenblatt | January 16, 2013 | 6.54 |
Rayna and Juliette prepare for their first concert together in San Diego. Rayna surprises Teddy by coming home from the tour to watch the votes come in and wait to see whether he becomes mayor. Songs: No new original songs.
| 11 | 11 | "You Win Again" | Paul Edwards | Liz Tigelaar | January 23, 2013 | 5.51 |
To celebrate the success of "Wrong Song," Edgehill Records throws a party. Deacon joins Juliette's band, leaving Rayna surprised. Songs: "Keep Asking Why" (sung by Avery); "One Works Better" (sung by Scarlett and Gunnar)
| 12 | 12 | "I've Been Down That Road Before" | Stephen Cragg | Meredith Lavender & Marcie Ulin | February 6, 2013 | 5.30 |
Deacon plays his first show with Juliette. Juliette wants to make her music more mature. After Rayna asks Deacon why he joined Juliette's band, he kisses her. Gunnar moves in with Scarlett and Teddy shows up at Rayna's hotel room and says something that will change their relationship forever. Songs: "Consider Me" (sung by Juliette); "I'm a Girl" (sung by Juliette)
| 13 | 13 | "There'll Be No Teardrops Tonight" | Eric Stoltz | Todd Ellis Kessler & David Marshall Grant | February 13, 2013 | 5.74 |
Rayna becomes overwhelmed onstage and finds comfort in Liam. Juliette makes changes on her tour and cleans house. Rayna and Teddy tell Maddie and Daphne about their plans to divorce; Maddie then tells her mother that she overheard her father talking to Peggy on the phone. Songs: "Casino" (sung by Scarlett and Gunnar); "It's My Life" (sung by Rayna)
| 14 | 14 | "Dear Brother" | Jonathan Pontell | Nancy Miller & Dana Greenblatt | February 27, 2013 | 5.20 |
Juliette throws a surprise birthday party for Deacon; Rayna gets hounded by the press because of her divorce. Songs: "We Are Water" (sung by Juliette); "Stronger Than Me" (sung by Rayna)
| 15 | 15 | "When You're Tired of Breaking Other Hearts" | Paul McCrane | Jason George & David Gould | March 27, 2013 | 5.18 |
When Juliette plays a secret concert for her fans an accident happens leaving fans with minor injuries including Maddie. Gunnar wants to know who shot his brother; Rayna talks to Katie Couric about her divorce and Scarlett gets an offer to sign with Rayna's new label as a solo act. Songs: "Love Like Mine" (sung by Juliette and Deacon); "Keep Asking Why" (sung by Avery); "Hypnotizing" (sung by Juliette); "Looking for a Place to Shine" (sung by Scarlett); "Let There Be Lonely" (sung by Avery)
| 16 | 16 | "I Saw the Light" | Julie Hébert | Wendy Calhoun | April 3, 2013 | 5.54 |
Juliette is jealous of Rayna when she sees her billboard in New York so she seeks out a sponsorship of her own. While on tour with her mom, Maddie decides that she wants to become a singer much to Rayna's disliking. Rayna meets Deacon's new girlfriend. Songs: "Ho Hey" (sung by Maddie and Daphne); "Tough All Over" (sung by Will and Gunnar); "Stompin' Grounds" (sung by Rayna)
| 17 | 17 | "My Heart Would Know" | Sanaa Hamri | Mollie Bickley St. John | April 10, 2013 | 5.96 |
Rayna rushes home to Nashville to be there for her father after he suffers a heart attack. Meanwhile, Jolene and Deacon are not happy with Jolene's sponsor, Dante, who becomes Juliette's new manager. Songs: "Shine" (sung by Gunnar); "Hangin' on a Lie" (sung by Juliette)
| 18 | 18 | "Take These Chains from My Heart" | Eric Stoltz | Meredith Lavender & Marcie Ulin | May 1, 2013 | 5.27 |
Jolene is suspicious of Dante after she sees him kissing another woman. Liam plays the Nashville show with Rayna and plans to spend the weekend away with her. Stacey questions Deacon if he still has feelings for Rayna. After discovering that the drugs found on Jolene were not hers, Emily says that some money is missing which makes Juliette suspicious of Dante. Rayna changes her mind about the trip and goes to tell Deacon that she still loves him. Gunnar gets an offer to record a demo after singing songs penned by his dead brother. Songs: "Tough All Over" (sung by Will and Gunnar); "Gun For a Mouth" (sung by Gunnar); "Postcard from Mexico" (sung by Rayna and Liam)
| 19 | 19 | "Why Don't You Love Me" | Stephen Cragg | Todd Ellis Kessler | May 8, 2013 | 5.38 |
Edgehill throws a party to celebrate their artists who are nominated for CMA Awards. Rayna tells Teddy and Tandy that she is back together with Deacon while they tell her not to tell him that he is Maddie's biological father. When Deacon comes home to his house he is surprised to see Stacey there, she wants to get back together with him but he has to tell her that he is with Rayna now. Juliette turns to drinking to cope after what happened with Dante, causing Jolene concern for her. After Juliette goes on a rant Deacon quits her band, Teddy is having a tough time with Maddie as she blames him for her parents' split. Songs: "Used" (sung by Juliette); "The End of the Day" (sung by Rayna and Deacon); "The Morning of the Rain (Roadie Version)" (sung by Avery and the Roadies)
| 20 | 20 | "A Picture from Life's Other Side" | Michael Waxman | Dee Johnson | May 15, 2013 | 5.56 |
Dante threatens to release a sex tape of him and Juliette if she doesn't give him ten million dollars. Juliette decides not to give in and let him sell it. Jolene refuses to let her daughter be humiliated so she calls Dante to meet up with her so she can give him the money and he'll give her the SD card. Juliette goes to Jolene's apartment to find Dante's dead body and Jolene dead from a drug overdose; implying that Jolene murdered him and then killed herself. Meanwhile, Teddy serves Rayna with a restraining order stating that he doesn't want Deacon around the girls; Rayna finds support in Lamar. Scarlett doesn't like how Gunnar is trying to be like his brother and breaks up with him. Maddie finds out that Teddy might not be her real father. Songs: "If Mama Coulda Seen Me" (sung by Gunnar); "A Showman's Life" (sung by Will)
| 21 | 21 | "I'll Never Get Out of This World Alive" | Callie Khouri | Callie Khouri | May 22, 2013 | 6.02 |
Backstage at the CMA Awards, Deacon confronts Rayna and asks her if he is Maddie's biological father after Maddie tells him that he might be her father. Deacon and Maddie are furious when they find out the truth which leads Deacon back to drinking. Meanwhile, Juliette wins Female Vocalist of the Year and pays her final respects to her mother. Teddy gets a call from the U.S. Attorney General and meets up Peggy who reveals she is pregnant. Gunnar proposes to Scarlett. When Rayna takes a drunk Deacon home they argue along the way and end up in a car wreck. Songs: "Bitter Memory" (sung by Rayna); "Moon is High" (sung by Avery and Scarlett); "Nothing in this World Will Ever Break My Heart Again" (sung by Juliette)

== Specials ==
| Special no. | Title | Narrator | Aired between | Original air date | U.S. viewers (millions) |
|---|---|---|---|---|---|
| 1 | "The Whole Story" | Charles Esten as Deacon | "Where He Leads Me" (Episode 8) "Be Careful of Stones That You Throw" (Episode 9) | January 2, 2013 | 3.94 |

== U.S. ratings ==
| # | Title | Air date | Rating/Share (18–49) | Viewers (millions) | DVR 18-49 | DVR viewers (millions) | Total 18-49 | Total viewers (millions) |
|---|---|---|---|---|---|---|---|---|
| 1 | "Pilot" | October 10, 2012 | 2.8/8 | 8.93 | 1.4 | 3.52 | 4.2 | 12.46 |
| 2 | "I Can't Help It (If I'm Still in Love with You)" | October 17, 2012 | 2.0/6 | 6.74 | 1.3 | 3.09 | 3.3 | 9.83 |
| 3 | "Someday You'll Call My Name" | October 24, 2012 | 2.0/6 | 6.54 | 1.2 | 2.82 | 3.2 | 9.36 |
| 4 | "We Live in Two Different Worlds" | October 31, 2012 | 1.8/5 | 5.74 | 1.3 | 2.92 | 3.0 | 8.53 |
| 5 | "Move It on Over" | November 7, 2012 | 2.0/5 | 6.07 | 1.2 | 2.81 | 3.2 | 8.88 |
| 6 | "You're Gonna Change (Or I'm Gonna Leave)" | November 14, 2012 | 1.8/5 | 5.93 | 1.3 | 2.97 | 3.1 | 8.9 |
| 7 | "Lovesick Blues" | November 28, 2012 | 1.8/5 | 5.69 | 1.1 | 2.61 | 2.9 | 8.3 |
| 8 | "Where He Leads Me" | December 5, 2012 | 1.9/5 | 5.95 | 1.2 | 2.79 | 3.1 | 8.74 |
| 9 | "Be Careful of Stones That You Throw" | January 9, 2013 | 2.1/6 | 5.92 | 1.2 | 2.91 | 3.3 | 8.83 |
| 10 | "I'm Sorry for You My Friend" | January 16, 2013 | 2.2/6 | 6.54 | 1.1 | 2.63 | 3.3 | 9.17 |
| 11 | "You Win Again" | January 23, 2013 | 1.9/5 | 5.51 | 1.3 | 3.0 | 3.2 | 8.51 |
| 12 | "I've Been Down That Road Before" | February 6, 2013 | 1.7/5 | 5.30 | 1.2 | 2.76 | 2.9 | 8.06 |
| 13 | "There'll Be No Teardrops Tonight" | February 13, 2013 | 1.8/5 | 5.74 | 1.2 | 2.76 | 3.0 | 8.5 |
| 14 | "Dear Brother" | February 27, 2013 | 1.6/4 | 5.20 | 1.3 | 2.95 | 2.9 | 8.15 |
| 15 | "When You're Tired of Breaking Other Hearts" | March 27, 2013 | 1.5/4 | 5.18 | 1.1 | 2.66 | 2.6 | 7.84 |
| 16 | "I Saw the Light" | April 3, 2013 | 1.7/5 | 5.54 | 0.9 | 2.29 | 2.6 | 7.83 |
| 17 | "My Heart Would Know" | April 10, 2013 | 1.8/5 | 5.96 | 0.8 | 2.09 | 2.6 | 8.05 |
| 18 | "Take These Chains from My Heart" | May 1, 2013 | 1.7/5 | 5.27 | 0.8 | 2.33 | 2.5 | 7.6 |
| 19 | "Why Don't You Love Me" | May 8, 2013 | 1.6/4 | 5.38 | 0.9 | 2.19 | 2.5 | 7.57 |
| 20 | "A Picture from Life's Other Side" | May 15, 2013 | 1.6/5 | 5.56 | 0.9 | 2.23 | 2.5 | 7.79 |
| 21 | "I'll Never Get Out of This World Alive" | May 22, 2013 | 1.9/5 | 6.02 | 0.8 | 2.23 | 2.7 | 8.25 |
