= Nashville season 2 =

2013–2014 season of American TV series

Nashville
- Season 2
- Season 2 DVD cover
- Starring: Connie Britton; Hayden Panettiere; Clare Bowen; Chris Carmack; Eric Close; Charles Esten; Jonathan Jackson; Sam Palladio; Lennon Stella; Maisy Stella
- No. of episodes: 22

Release
- Original network: ABC
- Original release: September 25, 2013 – May 14, 2014

Season chronology
- ← Previous; Season 1 Next → Season 3

The second season of the American television musical drama series, Nashville, began on September 25, 2013 and concluded on May 14, 2014, on ABC. The series was renewed for a second season on May 10, 2013.

With the exceptions of "Tomorrow Never Comes" and "On the Other Hand", the episodes are named after songs by female country artists such as Patsy Cline, Emmylou Harris, and Kitty Wells.

== Cast ==
=== Regular ===
- Connie Britton as Rayna Jaymes
- Hayden Panettiere as Juliette Barnes
- Clare Bowen as Scarlett O'Connor
- Chris Carmack as Will Lexington
- Eric Close as Teddy Conrad
- Charles Esten as Deacon Claybourne
- Jonathan Jackson as Avery Barkley
- Sam Palladio as Gunnar Scott
- Lennon Stella as Maddie Conrad
- Maisy Stella as Daphne Conrad

=== Recurring ===
- Chaley Rose as Zoey Dalton
- Ed Amatrudo as Glenn Goodman
- Judith Hoag as Tandy Hampton
- Aubrey Peeples as Layla Grant
- Oliver Hudson as Jeff Fordham
- Will Chase as Luke Wheeler
- Christina Chang as Megan Vannoy
- David Alford as Bucky Dawes
- Derek Krantz as Brent McKinney
- Kimberly Williams-Paisley as Peggy Kentor
- Charlie Bewley as Charles Wentworth
- Michiel Huisman as Liam McGuinnis
- Powers Boothe as Lamar Wyatt

=== Guest ===
- Dana Wheeler-Nicholson as Beverly O'Connor
- Charlotte Ross as Ruth Bennett
- Robert Wisdom as Coleman Carlisle
- Suzanne Alexander as herself
- Conan O'Brien as himself
- Katie Cook as herself
- Robin Roberts as herself
- Kelly Clarkson as herself
- Zac Brown as himself
- Jay DeMarcus as himself
- Austin Dillon as himself
- Mario Lopez as himself
- Maria Menounos as herself
- Brad Paisley as himself
- Michelle Obama as herself
- Kellie Pickler as herself

== Production ==
On May 10, 2013, Nashville was renewed for a second season by ABC. Season 2 began on September 25, 2013, at 10/9c. Chris Carmack, Lennon Stella, and Maisy Stella were promoted to series regulars, while Powers Boothe and Robert Wisdom were reduced to recurring status, in the second season. Aubrey Peeples and Chaley Rose joined the cast in major recurring roles as Layla Grant, a runner-up in a singing competition and a new singer in Nashville who is a new rival for Juliette, and Zoey, Scarlett's childhood best friend who moves to Nashville.

== Episodes ==
No. overall	No. in season	Title	Directed by	Written by	Original release date	US viewers (millions)
22	1	"I Fall to Pieces"	Michael Waxman	Dee Johnson	September 25, 2013	6.50
Following the wreck Rayna is left in a medically induced coma and is hanging on to life. Deacon thinks he was the one driving so he pleads guilty for driving under the influence and goes to jail. Scarlett says no to Gunnar's proposal and moves out, Will moves in. Juliette comforts Maddie and Maddie tells her that Deacon is her father. Scarlett's childhood friend Zoey moves to town, Peggy suffers a miscarriage but lies to Teddy. Rayna regains consciousness and says that she was the one driving. Songs: "How You Learn to Live Alone" (sung by Avery); "This Love Ain't Big Enough" (sung by Juliette); "Why Can't I Say Goodnight?" (sung by Scarlett and Gunnar)
23	2	"Never No More"	Callie Khouri	Meredith Lavender & Marcie Ulin	October 2, 2013	5.98
Rayna and Juliette meet the new CEO of Edgehill, Jeff, who is all about numbers. The two butt heads with him about what direction Juliette should take her music in and his taking Will from Rayna's label. Maddie is still not happy with her mother and doesn't know how to treat Deacon. Juliette meets her new rival Layla, Gunnar has writer's block, and Deacon is told that he may not be able to play guitar again. Songs: "Hypnotizing" (sung by Juliette); "Tears so Strong" (sung by Will); "Adios Old Friend" (sung by Gunnar); "Gonna Get Even" (sung by Layla)
24	3	"I Don't Wanna Talk About It Now"	Paul McCrane	Tyler Bensinger	October 9, 2013	5.84
Teddy and Rayna finalize their divorce. Liam returns to work with Rayna and they rekindle their relationship, but Rayna reveals some troubling news. Deacon starts attending his AA meetings again, revealing his turbulent childhood with his father, and is reluctant to make the same mistakes. Will, Scarlett and Layla make their stage debut for Jeff, but he's incensed when Rayna announces she's signed Scarlett to her new label Highway 65. Meanwhile, Juliette stages a concert for a wealthy couple. Songs: "What if I Was Willing?" (sung by Will); "Trouble Is" (sung by Juliette); "Waitin'" (sung by Scarlett)
25	4	"You're No Angel Yourself"	Julie Hébert	Wendy Calhoun	October 16, 2013	5.76
Rayna cancels the remainder of the tour to spend more time with her girls which leaves Juliette furious. Juliette has moved on from doing over produced numbers and refuses to play half houses. Teddy proposes to Peggy but tells her to keep it a secret. Everyone finds out when Maddie notices her wearing the ring around her neck. Mad at her parents, Maddie runs away. The more Tandy finds about her mother's death the more she becomes suspicious of her father. Desperate to keep playing full arenas, Juliette asks Layla to open for her. Gunnar refuses to let Will cut his song. Songs: "A Life That's Good" (sung by Maddie and Daphne); "Wayfaring Stranger" (sung by Zoey); "I'm a Girl" (sung by Juliette); "Come See About Me" (sung by Scarlett and Zoey); "A Life That's Good" (sung by Deacon, Maddie, and Daphne)
26	5	"Don't Open That Door"	Michael Grossman	Dana Greenblatt	October 23, 2013	5.46
Edgehill throws a benefit concert for all of its best acts. Label CEO Jeff decides that all his new artists should sell themselves as sexy and hot looking people, which has been a struggle for Scarlett as Layla notices. When she tries to intervene, Will accuses Layla of trying to destroy Scarlett. Rayna is unsure she can still sing, but proves it when she takes to the stage at the benefit concert. Gunnar, Avery and Zoey decide to write songs together. Juliette is asked to join the Grand Ole Opry, which leaves her speechless. Songs: "This Town" (sung by Scarlett and Deacon); "The Best Songs Come From Broken Hearts" (sung by Rayna)
27	6	"It Must Be You"	Kate Woods	Monica Macer	October 30, 2013	5.25
Everybody comes out to the annual Belle Meade Polo tournament, where Juliette gets invited by Charlie Wentworth and Rayna tries to rub elbows with the rich to see if they want to invest in her label. Scarlett plays a show for the critics at the Bluebird and also reconnects with Avery. Juliette and Charlie spend the night with each other again but this time his wife walks in on them. Songs: "You're the Kind of Trouble" (sung by Deacon); "That's What I Do" (sung by Avery and Gunnar); "Hypnotizing (Acoustic)" (sung by Juliette and Charles); "Every Time I Fall in Love" (sung by Scarlett)
28	7	"She's Got You"	Mario Van Peebles	Debra Fordham	November 13, 2013	5.52
As Juliette's tour rolls into Houston she has made the decision that she no longer wants to butter up to a powerful DJ to get airplay and good reviews like in the past. This results in critics leaving her show before her set and bad reviews. Teddy and Peggy's wedding day approaches and Maddie is less than thrilled because she feels that her father will forget her once he marries Peggy. Rayna gets closer to Luke Wheeler, Deacon gets the courage to sing in front of people without playing his guitar and Juliette gets a surprise visitor. Songs: "Gonna Get Even" (sung by Layla); "Share With You" (sung by Maddie and Daphne)
29	8	"Hanky Panky Woman"	Eric Stoltz	David Gould	November 20, 2013	5.75
When Scarlett opens up for Luke, she has stage fright and a bad reception in her in ear monitors. People boo and throw things at her, making Rayna come to the rescue. By the next night she feels more confident. After being hit on by Olivia Wentworth, Juliette finds out that Olivia and Charlie just wanted her to be a part of their threesome. Rayna is forced to give her masters to the label and Jeff threatens to release a Rayna Jaymes album against her will. When Teddy asks to go to the doctor with Peggy, she fears that he will find out that she really isn't pregnant and lied to him so she fakes a miscarriage. Songs: "Dreams" (sung by Juliette); "Crazy Tonight" (sung by Scarlett); "Ball and Chain" (sung by Rayna and Luke)
30	9	"I'm Tired of Pretending"	Kevin Dowling	David Handelman	December 4, 2013	5.70
Maddie begins taking guitar lessons with Deacon, and he and Teddy come to blows at her open mic performance after she and Deacon perform together. Rayna struggles to strike the right balance with the two dads and their fatherhood responsibilities. Meanwhile, Lamar makes a plea to Rayna to secure Tandy's support as a character witness, but Tandy fails to show up at his hearing and he's denied bail. Juliette is distracted by the fact that Layla's career is stealing some of her spotlight. She also learns that the Wentworths are to divorce. Zoey and Avery visit Scarlett on the road in an effort to boost her spirits. However, she catches Zoey and Gunnar together. Layla decides to get back at Juliette by contacting the press to announce that Juliette is the cause of the Wentworths marriage break-up. Songs: "Tell Me (Acoustic)" (sung by Layla); "Can't Say No To You" (sung by Juliette and Will)
31	10	"Tomorrow Never Comes"	Patrick Norris	Meredith Lavender & Marcie Ulin	December 11, 2013	5.18
Juliette is the main act at Teddy's first annual Music City Festival, but the media hounds her over her relationship with Charlie Wentworth. She tells Glenn to find out who leaked the news to the press but soon suspects Layla had something to do with it. Jeff corners Layla about the incident and tells her that if she had anything to do with it, he will drop her from Edgehill. Rayna is determined to buy herself out of her Edgehill contract, even though Tandy and Luke counsel otherwise. Deacon and Gunnar team up to put on an unauthorized show at the festival, while Scarlett freezes out Zoey and Gunnar but draws closer to Avery. Confused over his feelings for Brent, Will sleeps with him but later steps into the path of an oncoming train. An assassination attempt is made on Teddy, but Peggy ends up in the crossfire. Songs: "Can't Get it Right" (sung by Gunnar); "Playin' Tricks" (sung by Deacon); "What if I Was Willing?" (sung by Will)
32	11	"I'll Keep Climbing"	Callie Khouri	Tyler Bensinger	January 15, 2014	5.10
Peggy is revealed to have been killed by a disgruntled unemployed man, whose intended target was Teddy. Will is nowhere to be found, which concerns Brent and Layla, but Gunnar eventually locates him in the woods nearby. He tells Will to pull himself together, and that he's there for him if he needs a chat. Kelly Clarkson wishes to record a song that Gunnar and Scarlett wrote, but during their meeting Scarlett breaks down and leaves, apologizing that she thought she could work with Gunnar but can't. Juliette's reputation takes another blow as creative video editing shows her proclaiming there is no God, so she turns to Layla to help clear her name. Rayna's bought herself out of Edgehill, but the pressure to succeed is greater than ever. Deacon struggles to write during his sobriety and finds help from Maddie and Daphne. Songs: "Believing" (sung by Maddie and Deacon); "Lately" (sung by Scarlett and Gunnar);
33	12	"Just for What I Am"	Stephen Cragg	Ben St John & Mollie Bickley St John	January 22, 2014	5.03
Scarlett sings "Free" in concert with Zac Brown, but the demands of fame are burning her out. Rayna asks Deacon to help write a much-needed hit for her new album, and it's like old times. At Edgehill's No.1s party, Scarlett gives Gunnar the cold shoulder and later tells Rayna how Deacon will follow her every command, so Rayna and Deacon agree to cool off their contact for the time being. Concert venues are dropping from Juliette's tour and Jeff is furious, so he tells Juliette to apologize for her blasphemous comment or she'll be dropped. After failing to get a response to his phone calls, Avery calls to see Juliette to find her passed out on her bed. He tries to cheer her up by taking her busking, and it seems to work as she later requests that they write a song together. Zoey is bruised by Gunnar's inattention when he gets an invitation to co-write from Jay DeMarcus of Rascal Flatts. Teddy discovers that the man who killed Peggy was a former employee of a subsidiary of Wyatt Industries, and believes Lamar had something to do with her murder. Rayna and Luke decide to make their relationship official. Songs: "Free" (sung by Scarlett and the Zac Brown Band); "This Time" (sung by Rayna); "Everything I'll Ever Need" (sung by Avery and Juliette); "Can't Get it Right" (sung by Gunnar)
34	13	"It's All Wrong, But It's All Right"	Bethany Rooney	Debra Fordham	January 29, 2014	5.28
Jeff expects Juliette to formally apologize for her behavior during her Grand Ole Opry ceremony, but when she takes to the stage she ignores the teleprompter and performs "Don't Put Dirt on My Grave Just Yet", which angers him so he tells her she's no longer part of Edgehill. Luke introduces Rayna to a power player that could help her get her distribution deal off the ground, and then surprises her with a NASCAR car wrapped in Rayna Jaymes' graphics. However, she soon discovers that the distribution deal means that Juliette will no longer have a place on his shelves. Deacon discovers his record deal might not be what he expected and Scarlett's collaboration with Liam gets off to a rocky start, but she finally finds her creative side with the help of some prescription drugs. Layla decides to seek help with songwriting from Gunnar, but he ends up upsetting her, leading to a confrontation with Will, in which he advises Will to tell Layla the truth. Will and Layla discover they aren't all that different and find comfort in one another's company. Teddy will stop at nothing to reveal Lamar's connection to Peggy's death. Tandy is arrested for failing to testify at Lamar's hearing, but Teddy is not pleased when a news report announces that he is set to be released from prison. Songs: "Don't Put Dirt on My Grave Just Yet" (sung by Juliette); "Black Roses" (sung by Scarlett)
35	14	"Too Far Gone"	Patrick Norris	Monica Macer	February 5, 2014	5.16
Lamar arrives home from prison but gets the cold shoulder from Tandy. Teddy tells Rayna that Lamar was responsible for Peggy's death, and Tandy confesses that he was responsible for their mother's death. Rayna confronts him to demand the truth, and he reveals that her mother was having an affair with Watty and lost control of her car when she tried to leave. Rayna tells him he will never see Maddie and Daphne again. Meanwhile, having spent the night together, Juliette hides out at Avery's apartment but he tells her she will have to face the world sometime. Deacon finds out that Teddy is one of Megan's clients and feels she's only with him as she feels sorry for him. Will is not satisfied with the demos given to him and asks Jeff to sack Brent. Zoey is turned down for an audition, but refuses to give up and returns later with a demo. Scarlett's change in mood seems to baffle everyone. Deacon performs at the Bluebird and tells Avery and Juliette they look good together. Lamar confronts Teddy and suffers a fatal heart attack, as Teddy looks on. Songs: "The Blues Have Blown Away" (sung by Rayna, Maddie, and Daphne); "Keep Coming Back" (sung by Deacon); "Is That Who I Am?" (sung by Will); "Who I Am" (sung by Will)
36	15	"They Don't Make 'Em Like My Daddy Anymore"	Patrick Norris	Monica Macer	February 26, 2014	4.77
Liam and Scarlett play "Black Roses" for Rayna, and she loves it. She receives numerous phone calls from Teddy but they go unanswered. Teddy visits Rayna to tell her that Lamar died, and Maddie and Daphne are devastated. Maddie contacts Deacon, and he visits Rayna, who reassures him she's fine. Teddy holds a press conference to announce Lamar's death, but later reveals to Megan that he did nothing to help while Lamar had his heart attack. Avery plays his tweaked version of "Don't Put Dirt on My Grave Just Yet" for Juliette, and shows her a positive review from the New Yorker. The song catches the ear of high-powered, hit-making producer Howie V, and her brings her to LA to record it with a live orchestra and do a photoshoot with Rolling Stone magazine. However, Glenn feels sidelined and decides to return to Nashville. Deacon asks Avery, Gunnar and Zoey to be his backup at a gig, which proves to be a success. After performing with him at the Bluebird, Avery, Gunnar and Zoey decide to form a trio. Scarlett feels alone and shares a kiss with Liam. Juliette tells Glenn that she doesn't want to move away from being a country singer, and can't do it without him. Following Lamar's memorial service, Rayna finally comes to terms with everything that's happened and breaks down, as Tandy and Teddy look on. Songs: "I Ain't Leaving Without Your Love" (sung by Avery, Zoey, and Gunnar); "Like New" (sung by Deacon)
37	16	"Guilty Street"	David Grossman	Sibyl Gardner	March 5, 2014	5.09
After performing "Don't Put Dirt on My Grave Just Yet", major pop labels are vying to sign Juliette, overwhelming Avery. They go to a fancy restaurant to celebrate and receive an expensive bottle of champagne from Jeff. Juliette storms over to his table and slams the bottle down, telling him where to go. However, he offers her a new deal with Edgehill with Avery as her writer, but after much deliberation she turns it down. Rayna discovers Tandy's been bouncing checks for Highway 65, which affects Rayna's ability to sign new artists. Will tries to boost Layla's career but only makes matters worse between him and Jeff. Deacon runs into an old friend, Ruth Bennett at an AA meeting, but rejects her advances as he's with Megan. While clearing out Peggy's belongings, Teddy discovers medication that she took for her miscarriage, and confesses to Megan that he thought he knew Peggy but was wrong. They end up sleeping together. Rayna catches Scarlett and Liam together and advises him to end their relationship, so he tells her he's leaving for Tokyo. Tensions between Gunnar and Avery arise ahead of their first gig with Zoey. Juliette asks Rayna if she will sign her to Highway 65 as a means of resurrecting her career and Rayna agrees. Songs: "Come Find Me" (sung by Scarlett); "Hennessee" (sung by Avery, Gunnar, and Zoey); "Playin' Tricks" (sung by Deacon)
38	17	"We've Got Things to Do"	Ron Underwood	Dana Greenblatt	March 12, 2014	5.08
As she prepares to join Highway 65, Juliette tells Rayna that she wants to release "Don't Put Dirt on My Grave Just Yet" as a digital download, but Rayna has other ideas. Will learns that Juliette is dropping him from her tour, and also discovers that Brent is now Layla's manager. Scarlett tells Rayna that she wants Avery to produce her new album, which causes tension between him and Juliette. At the Highway 65 label party, Juliette starts to feel that she is being upstaged by Rayna's up-and-coming talent, and sabotages the event by taking to the stage to announce that she is now on the label. Luke offers Deacon a supporting slot on his upcoming tour alongside Will. However, Deacon is more concerned with Megan's behavior and she tells Teddy to leave her alone. Meanwhile, Maddie becomes fixated on her music, ignoring her studies, and when she tells Teddy she wants to live with Deacon he grounds her. Layla believes Will is not reciprocating her feelings, but he ends up proposing to her and she says "yes". Gunnar feels like he is the only one truly interested in the band, and Zoey is turned down as a backup singer. Songs: "Carry You Home" (sung by Zoey); "He Ain't Gonna Change" (sung by Rayna and Juliette); "I Can't Sleep Tonight" (sung by Maddie); "It All Slows Down" (sung by Layla)
39	18	"Your Wild Life's Gonna Get You Down"	Julie Hébert	David Gould	March 26, 2014	5.19
Rayna plays a mini-set on Luke's tour, and her girls meet his teenage son, Colt, who has a big social media following. They find they don't share musical tastes but Colt is impressed when they do a duet and records a video. However, Luke orders him to take the video off his website. Rayna discovers Maddie's video and tells her to take it down as she only wants to protect her. Teddy forbids Maddie from attending Deacon's concert, but later changes his mind when Rayna says she wants her there. During the concert, he comes to blows with Deacon when Deacon discovers the truth about him and Megan. He then breaks up with her. Juliette is angered when Avery misses her set as he's busy helping Scarlett and takes it out on her. While they attend the aftershow party, she becomes suspicious of Scarlett's behavior, saying it's similar to how her mother was. Jeff questions Will about why he's marrying Layla and later asks Gunnar if Will is gay. Will and Layla decide to have a shotgun wedding and it goes ahead without a hitch, in spite of Gunnar's refusal to be his best man. Luke discovers that Deacon is Maddie's biological father, but tells Rayna he will support her. Songs: "Tell That Devil" (sung by Juliette); "Falling" (sung by Scarlett and Avery); "Joy Parade" (sung by Maddie and Daphne); "It's on Tonight" (sung by Deacon, Will, and Luke)
40	19	"Crazy"	Jean de Segonzac	Debra Fordham	April 2, 2014	5.18
Maddie's news goes viral and stirs a media frenzy including being a "Hot Topic" on The View. Luke thinks a friend of Colt's may have put the video online. When the press show up outside Deacon's house, Rayna gets worried he has returned to his old ways as he isn't returning her calls. She and Luke locate him at the house that she and Deacon had bought before she discovered she was pregnant with Maddie. Deacon refuses to have anything to do with Teddy since he slept with Megan, but Rayna tries to manage the fallout by going on Good Morning America where Deacon admits that she and Teddy have done a good job raising her. Gunnar is shocked when he receives a large royalty check and wants to treat Zoey, so he arranges a recording session. A gig promoter phones but only wants to see Gunnar if he gets the band back together. When Juliette faces more empty seats on her tour, she reaches out to Charlie Wentworth for a favor, but he sees it as a means of getting back with her, so Avery tells him to back off. Scarlett's mother, Beverly, surprises her daughter in San Francisco. However, she soon shows her true colors, becoming abusive after Scarlett sings "Black Roses" to her, and things take their toll when Scarlett has a meltdown on stage. Songs: "Done Runnin'" (sung by Zoey); "Your Good Girl's Gonna Go Bad" (sung by Beverly)
41	20	"Your Good Girl's Gonna Go Bad"	Mario Van Peebles	Meredith Lavender & Marcie Ulin	April 30, 2014	4.62
After Scarlett's meltdown on stage, Avery comes to the rescue. Juliette says to get the jet ready to fly Scarlett back home so the media won't find out or show up. The next day in Nashville Rayna, Deacon and Buckley are all waiting for them at the airport. Even though Rayna is not blaming Juliette, Rayna says that it wasn't the best idea to send Scarlett on tour with Juliette. Deacon responds to her and says "I told you so", knowing all of this would be too much for her as it was Rayna's responsibility to figure this out. When the plane arrives they check on Scarlett and send her to a clinic to help get everything out of her system. While Gunnar shows Zoey the house that he bought Avery calls Zoey to tell her about Scarlett. At Will's rehearsal Layla shows up with a reality TV producer saying that they should do a reality TV together. Later on Gunnar meets with Jeff who is starting a publishing division at the label and offers him to come to the company. Gunnar tells Jeff that word around town is that Edgehill is struggling after losing Rayna and Juliette. Jeff fires back and tells him that he'll have access to even more royalties and not to blow more opportunities with A-list talent like Kelly Clarkson. Gunnar replies that he wasn't the one who blew it, Jeff says that it was his looney ex-partner (Scarlett) who did. Not liking Jeff calling Scarlett looney, Gunnar defends her and walks off. Scarlett comes to the decision that she doesn't want this and Rayna says that she will release her from her contract. That night at the BMI party Gunnar catches Jeff and Juliette emerging from their hookup. Songs: "Hurtin' On Me" (sung by Will); "It Ain't Yours to Throw Away" (sung by Gunnar); "Wrong for the Right Reasons" (sung by Rayna)
42	21	"All or Nothing with Me"	Michael Waxman	Dee Johnson	May 7, 2014	4.70
While Luke is in Afghanistan visiting the troops, the convoy he is in is hit by an IED. Rayna flies to New York so she can be there for him when he arrives. Luke is beating himself up that he wasn't able to give the troops a show because of the accident so Rayna suggests that they should do a show live from Fort Campbell and simulcast it to all of the troops. Meanwhile Juliette feels guilty for sleeping with Jeff, Deacon and Maddie spend time together, and production starts on Will and Layla's reality show which Gunnar refuses to be a part of. Avery apologizes to Juliette for being focused on Scarlett's recovery and reassures her that she is the one who he loves. When Luke hears that Juliette will be performing at the show he is not happy. Juliette hears him say this to Rayna and says that she will not sing though it will not stop her from meeting the troops. Luke overhears her saying to a soldier that she is there because her father was a Blackhawk pilot who died when she was four, and he asks her to sing. The two end up singing together. The show starts with First Lady Michelle Obama thanking the troops via satellite and Kellie Pickler also performs. Songs: "Then I Was Loved By You" (sung by Will); "Don't Put Dirt On My Grave Just Yet" (sung by Juliette and Luke); "A Life That's Good" (sung by Rayna, Deacon, Maddie, and Daphne)
43	22	"On the Other Hand"	Callie Khouri	Callie Khouri	May 14, 2014	5.24
Before Rayna heads out to New York to do her album promo on GMA, Bucky informs that she has been bumped for Will who is also releasing an album the same day as her thanks to Jeff. Desperately needing her album and label to be successful, Teddy is able to book LP Field for her to do a show. Juliette comes to Rayna asking out of her contract, saying it was a mistake signing with her but Rayna tells her no and that she will performing at the show at LP too. Deacon puts on a show for the Sober House and Maddie wants her mom to sign her. Afraid that Jeff will be the one telling Avery that he and Juliette slept together, Zoey and Gunnar are the ones after Avery senses something going on with them. Avery goes to break up with her and Juliette pleads with him not to. When Rayna and Luke get done singing "Ball and Chain", Luke asks Rayna to marry him, she accepts. Scarlett says goodbye to Gunnar before leaving town but he tells her not to. Will comes home and pulls Layla into a private room so that he can tell her he is gay (although a hidden camera captures the confession anyway). Deacon goes to see Rayna and tells her not to marry Luke because he knows how to love her now, gives her a ring and kisses her before leaving. Songs: "One Light Shining" (sung by Avery); "It Ain't Yours to Throw Away" (sung by Scarlett and Gunnar)

== U.S. ratings ==
No.	Title	Air date	Rating/Share (18–49)	Viewers (million)	DVR 18-49	DVR viewers (million)	Total 18-49	Total viewers (million)
1	"I Fall To Pieces"	September 25, 2013	2.0/6	6.50	1.1	2.85	3.1	9.35
2	"Never No More"	October 2, 2013	1.9/6	5.98	1.3	3.02	3.2	9.0
3	"I Don't Wanna Talk About It Now"	October 9, 2013	1.6/5	5.84	1.3	3.04	2.9	8.88
4	"You're No Angel Yourself"	October 16, 2013	1.6/5	5.76	1.2	2.71	2.8	8.47
5	"Don't Open That Door"	October 23, 2013	1.6/4	5.46	1.2	3.0	2.8	8.46
6	"It Must Be You"	October 30, 2013	1.4/4	5.25	1.4	3.27	2.8	8.52
7	"She's Got You"	November 13, 2013	1.5/5	5.52	1.3	3.12	2.8	8.64
8	"Hanky Panky Woman"	November 20, 2013	1.6/5	5.75	1.2	2.97	2.8	8.72
9	"I'm Tired Of Pretending"	December 4, 2013	1.6/5	5.70	1.1	2.77	2.7	8.47
10	"Tomorrow Never Comes"	December 11, 2013	1.4/4	5.18	1.0	2.71	2.4	7.89
11	"I'll Keep Climbing"	January 15, 2014	1.3/4	5.10	1.2	3.04	2.5	8.14
12	"Just for What I Am"	January 22, 2014	1.4/4	5.03	1.1	2.98	2.5	8.01
13	"It's All Wrong, But It's All Right"	January 29, 2014	1.4/4	5.28	1.0	2.66	2.4	7.94
14	"Too Far Gone"	February 5, 2014	1.3/4	5.16	1.2	2.87	2.5	8.03
15	"They Don't Make 'Em Like My Daddy Anymore"	February 26, 2014	1.3/4	4.77	1.1	3.15	2.4	7.92
16	"Guilty Street"	March 5, 2014	1.5/4	5.09	1.1	3.0	2.6	8.09
17	"We've Got Things To Do"	March 12, 2014	1.4/4	5.08	1.0	2.57	2.4	7.65
18	"Your Wild Life's Gonna Get You Down"	March 26, 2014	1.3/4	5.19	1.1	2.96	2.4	8.15
19	"Crazy"	April 2, 2014	1.5/4	5.18	1.0	2.74	2.5	7.91
20	"Your Good Girl's Gonna Go Bad"	April 30, 2014	1.2/4	4.62	1.2	2.9	2.4	7.53
21	"All or Nothing with Me"	May 7, 2014	1.2/4	4.70	1.1	2.85	2.3	7.55
22	"On the Other Hand"	May 14, 2014	1.3/4	5.24	1.1	2.72	2.4	7.96
