= Lake Mary Preparatory School =

Private school in Lake Mary, Florida, United States

Location
- 650 Rantoul Lane; Lake Mary, (Seminole County), Florida 32746; United States; 28°46′39″N 81°19′26″W

Information
- School type: Private Private
- Opened: August 1999; 27 years ago
- NCES School ID: A0300970
- Principal: Amy Petrousky
- Headmaster: Preston Emerton
- Faculty: 75 (2024-2025)
- Teaching staff: 57 (2024-2025)
- Grades: Pre-K–12
- Gender: Co-ed
- Enrollment: 561 (2024-2025)
- Hours in school day: 8
- Campus type: Large suburban
- Colors: Burgundy and gray with white and black accents
- Athletics: Yes
- Sports: Yes
- Mascot: Griffin
- Nickname: LMP
- Accreditations: FCIS, Cognia, and SAIS
- Alumni: Aubrey Peeples, Carl Yuan
- Website: www.lakemaryprep.com

Lake Mary Preparatory School (Lake Mary Prep) is a private school located in Lake Mary, Florida, founded in August 1999. It serves Pre-K through 12th grade, and is co-educational and non-sectarian. It is accredited by the Florida Council of Independent Schools (FCIS), Cognia, and Southern Association of Independent Schools (SAIS).

== Notable alumni ==
Ray Lewis III Sierra Brookes

- Aubrey Peeples (class of 2012), actress and singer
- Carl Yuan, professional golfer
