= Cynthia McWilliams =

American actress

Cynthia Kaye McWilliams
- Born: January 15, 1982 (age 44); Berlin, Germany
- Education: DePaul University (BFA)
- Occupations: Actress; voice over artist
- Years active: 2005–present
- Website: cynthiakayemcwilliams.com

Cynthia Kaye McWilliams is an American actress, known for her performances on the television series Real Husbands of Hollywood, Prison Break, and Nashville.

== Life and career ==
Cynthia Kaye McWilliams was born January 15, 1982, in Berlin, Germany, but was raised primarily in Kansas City, Kansas, United States. She graduated from The Theatre School at DePaul University in Chicago and later moved to Los Angeles, California. In 2005, McWilliams landed the recurring role as Kacee Franklin, C-Note's wife, in the Fox drama series, Prison Break. The following year, she appeared in the film The Lake House, and later co-starred in the independent films Of Boys and Men and One Small Hitch.

In 2011, McWilliams co-starred in the short-lived Fox crime-drama series, The Chicago Code as Lilly Beauchamp. She had a voice role as Misty Knight in the 2013 video game Marvel Heroes. In 2013, she began appearing in the recurring role of attorney Trina Shaw in the BET comedy series, Real Husbands of Hollywood. In 2015, after a decade of playing supporting roles, McWilliams appeared in a leading role in the NBC drama pilot Love Is a Four Letter Word.

In 2015, McWilliams co-starred in the video game Halo 5: Guardians as Spartan Holly Tanaka.

== Filmography ==
=== Film ===
Year	Title	Role	Notes
2006	The Lake House	Vanessa	
2008	Of Boys and Men	Jori	
2013	One Small Hitch	Risa	
2013	Love Will Keep Us Together	Bren	Television film
2013	The Starving Games	Additional voices	
2014	In God's Hands	Vivica	Television film
2015	Bilal: A New Breed of Hero	Ghufaira, Hamama	Voice
2017	The Labyrinth	-	
2019	Twas the Chaos before Christmas	Jayla Mitchell	Television film
2020	Upside-Down Magic	Professor Argon	Television film
2023	Hard Miles	Haddie	
2023	Merry Little Batman	Vicki Vale, Phone Operator, Angry Shopper, Bandleader	Voice; direct-to-streaming film
2024	Justice League: Crisis on Infinite Earths - Part Three	Dr. Beth Chapel, Cheetah	Voice; Direct-to-Video
2025	The Witcher: Sirens of the Deep	Queen Dahut	Voice

=== Television ===
Year	Title	Role	Notes
2005–07	Prison Break	Kacee Franklin	Recurring Cast: Season 1-2
2011	The Chicago Code	Lilly Beauchamp	Recurring Cast
2013–16	Real Husbands of Hollywood	Trina Shaw	Main Cast
2014	The Exes	Leila	Episode: "Bachelor Party"
2014	Almost Home	Shannon	Recurring Cast: Season 2
2014	Survivor's Remorse	Eva Robles	2 episodes
2014–17	Clarence	Additional voices	
2015	Surviving...	Shayla	Main Cast
2015	We Bare Bears	Additional voices	2 episodes
2015	Nashville	Gabriella Manning	Recurring Cast: Season 4
2016	The Odd Couple	Alexis	Episode: "The Ex-Factor"
2017	The New Edition Story	Sherry Carter	Episode: "Part 3"
2017	Tales from Apartment 8	Cynthia	Episode: "Hamilton"
2017–21	Bosch	Detective Joan Bennett	Guest: Season 3, Recurring Cast: Season 4 & 6-7
2018–19	Prince of Peoria	Regina Jackson	Main Cast
2021	Coyote	Holly Vincent	Main Cast
2021, 2023	What If...?	Gamora	Voice, 2 episodes: "What If... the Watcher Broke His Oath?", "What If... Iron Man Crashed Into the Grandmaster?"
2022	Real Husbands of Hollywood	Trina Shaw	Main Cast
2022	The Last Days of Ptolemy Grey	Sensia	Main Cast
2022	Bosch: Legacy	Detective Joan Bennett	Recurring Cast
2022	The Tam and Kevin Show	Lorraine	Episode: "Karens"
2022	Bee and PuppyCat	Ms. Coffee	Voice, episode: "Why Don't You Help Me"
2023	Hailey's On It!	Miss Jackson, Darlene	Voice
2023–present	Average Joe	Cathy Montgomery	Main Cast
2024	Invincible Fight Girl	Academy Supervisor	Voice, episode: "I Am"
2025	Bat-Fam	Vicki Vale	Voice

=== Video games ===
Year	Title	Voice role	Notes
2009	League of Legends	Senna	
2013	Marvel Heroes	Misty Knight	
2014	Infamous Second Son	Additional voices	
2014	The Amazing Spider-Man 2	Additional voices	
2015	Halo 5: Guardians	Holly Tanaka	Voice and motion capture
2016	Skylanders: Imaginators	Barbella	
2018	Far Cry 5	Resistance Soldier	
2018	State of Decay 2	Keesha Green	
2019	League of Legends	Senna	
2020	Legends of Runeterra	Senna	
2020	Valorant	Announcer	
2020	Disintegration	Hayden (Female)	
2020	Tell Me Why	Officer Wilson, Kendra Harris-Guidry	
2020	Cyberpunk 2077	T-Bug	Uncredited
2023	Starfield	Hadrian Sanon	
2025	South of Midnight	Lacey	
