= Aubrey Peeples =

American actor and singer (born 1993)

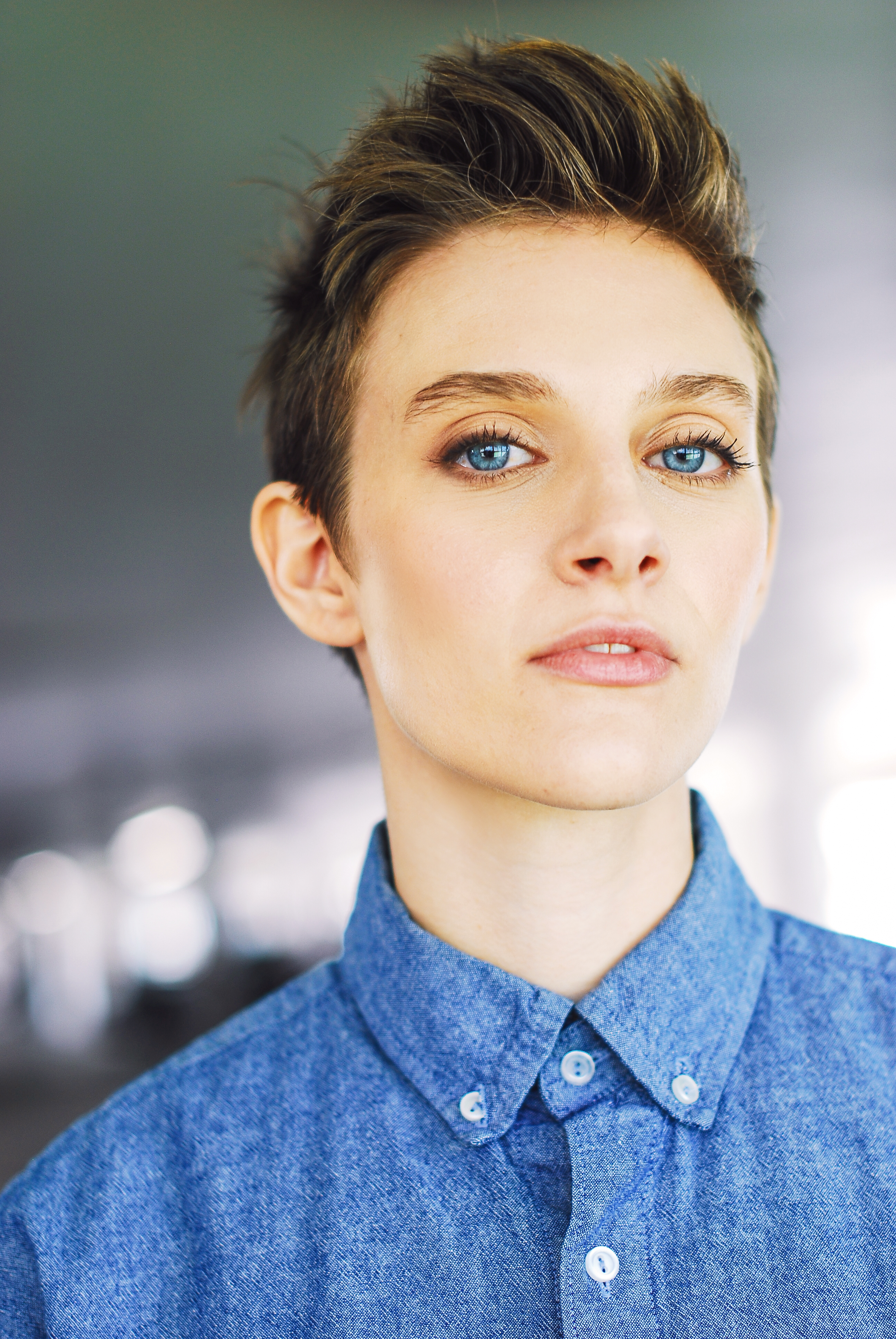
- Peeples in 2019
- Born: Aubrey Shea Peeples; November 27, 1993 (age 32); Lake Mary, Florida, U.S.
- Occupations: Actor, singer
- Years active: 2009–present

Aubrey Shea Peeples (born November 27, 1993) is an American actor and singer. They are best known for portraying Layla Grant in the ABC drama series Nashville. They also led Carrie Brownstein's pilot Search & Destroy for Hulu based on her band Sleater-Kinney. Peeples played the lead role in the musical film Jem and the Holograms (2015). Their directorial and screenwriting debut, Decadeless, premiered at the Portland Oregon Women's Film Festival in 2019.

== Early life ==
Aubrey Shea Peeples was born and raised in Lake Mary, Florida, by parents Wendy and Ashley, and has a younger sister named Ally. Growing up, Peeples performed with the Orlando Repertory Theatre (now Orlando Family Stage) for ten years. They graduated from Lake Mary Preparatory School, where they were valedictorian of the class of 2012. Peeples was accepted to Harvard University but deferred entry twice, the second time to accept their role on Nashville.

== Career ==
Peeples has guest-starred in Drop Dead Diva, Burn Notice, Austin & Ally, Grey's Anatomy and had a recurring role on Necessary Roughness. They also appeared in the made-for-television movies Ace Ventura Jr.: Pet Detective, The Good Mother and Sharknado.

They were cast in a major recurring role, playing Layla Grant, a runner-up in a reality singing competition and rising country star, in the second season of the ABC drama series Nashville. They were later promoted to regular status for Nashville's fourth season. However, Peeples did not return for the show's fifth season when Nashville moved to CMT.

In 2014, Peeples was cast as Jerrica "Jem" Benton, in the romantic musical fantasy comedy-drama film Jem and the Holograms, based on the 1980s television show of the same name. The same year Peeples co-starred in the crime thriller Rage opposite Nicolas Cage. In September 2014, Peeples was named one of the best actors under the age of twenty by Indiewire.

== Personal life ==
In 2019, Peeples opened up about having bipolar disorder in an interview with NKD Magazine. In November 2021, they came out as queer and non-binary. Peeples uses they/them pronouns.

== Filmography ==
=== Film ===
Year	Title	Role	Notes
2014	Rage	Caitlin Maguire	
2015	Jem and the Holograms	Jem / Jerrica Benton	
2017	Heartthrob	Sam Maddox	
2018	Locating Silver Lake	Talya	
2018	A Conversation: Anne Frank Meets God	Anne Frank	Short film
2018	Decadeless	Gertie	Short film; also writer & director
2022	Cowboy Drifter	Tanner Wilde	
2025	All There Is	Clementine	

=== Television ===
Year	Title	Role	Notes
2009	Ace Ventura Jr.: Pet Detective	Daniella	Television film
2010	Drop Dead Diva	Madison Thomas	Episode: "Bad Girls"
2011	Charlie's Angels	Sarah Daniels	Episode: "Angel with a Broken Wing"
2011	Burn Notice	Sophie Resnick	Episode: "Necessary Evil"
2011–2012	Necessary Roughness	Winter	3 episodes
2012	Austin & Ally	Cassidy	Episode: "Diners & Daters"
2013	Grey's Anatomy	Girlfriend	Episode: "The End Is the Beginning Is the End"
2013	The Good Mother	Kate	Television film
2013	Sharknado	Claudia Shepard	Television film
2013–2016	Nashville	Layla Grant	Main role; 54 episodes
2013	The Eric Andre Show	Themself	Episode: "Wiz Khalifa; Aubrey Peeples"
2014	Star-Crossed	Rochelle	Episode: "Pilot"
2016	Recovery Road	Harper	2 episodes
2019	Death of a Cheerleader	Bridget Moretti	Television film
2019	Search and Destroy	Charlotte	Television film
2022–2025	Unconventional	Margot Guillory	9 episodes
2025	King of Drag	Guest Judge	Episode: "A Song for the King"
