= Kourtney Hansen =

American actress (born c. 1980)

- Born: Kourtney Horner; Des Moines, Iowa, United States
- Occupations: Actress, dancer, on-air personality
- Years active: mid-2000s-present
- Spouse: Jeremy McComb (2013–present)
- Children: 2 and 1 step

Kourtney Horner, known by her stage name Kourtney Hansen is an American entrepreneur, actress, dancer, and on-air radio personality. She is known for her recurring role as Emily on the television series Nashville. She is married to Jeremy McComb.

== Background ==
She was born and raised in Des Moines, Iowa. As Kourtney Horner, she was a 2003 graduate of Drake University in theatre, earning a Bachelor of Fine Arts degree. Upon graduation, she co-founded Paw Pro's, an in home pet care business, with her childhood friend Kristin Duax. She has experience as a morning radio onair sidekick for Hatfield and McCoy on Des Moines' KJJY. She also worked in professional theatre. She moved to Nashville in 2008. After moving to Nashville, Hansen founded Paw Pro's Tennessee there and turned over her Paw Pro's Iowa business to her mother.

== Career ==
She is dance team captain for the Nashville Predators and has performed in music videos such as Keith Urban's 2008 "Sweet Thing", Luke Bryan's 2009 "Do I" and Jeremy McComb's 2008 "This Town Needs a Bar". "Do I" won the USA Weekend Breakthrough Video of the Year at the 2010 CMT Music Awards. She joined CMT in 2010, where she is a correspondent on CMT Insider. She is also a broadcast personality for the Predators. She landed her role on Nashville, where she plays the assistant to Hayden Panettiere's Juliette Barnes, through her Nashville talent agent Mark Block. At The Block Agency website, Hansen is listed as a 5-foot-5-inch (1.65 m) talent. She has starred in commercials for NV Energy PowerShift and 1-800-PetMeds.

== Personal life ==
In September 2012, she was engaged to Jeremy McComb. The couple wed on May 4, 2013. Kourtney has two sons named Knox McComb and Ryker Aurelius McComb. She has two half brothers who are her senior. Her grandfather owned the Iowa School of Beauty. Her mother's name is Kathy.
