= List of Crossing Jordan episodes =

This is the list of episodes for the NBC crime drama television series Crossing Jordan. It was broadcast from September 24, 2001 to May 16, 2007 and was created by Tim Kring. It stars Jill Hennessy as Dr. Jordan Cavanaugh, a crime-solving forensic pathologist employed in the Massachusetts Office of the Chief Medical Examiner. In addition to Jordan, the show followed an ensemble cast composed of Jordan's co-workers and police detectives assigned to the various cases.

== Series overview ==
Season	Episodes	Originally released		Average U.S. viewers (millions)	Rank
Season	Episodes	First released	Last released	Average U.S. viewers (millions)	Rank
1	23	September 24, 2001	May 13, 2002	12.8	28
2	22	September 23, 2002	May 5, 2003	10.6	44
3	13	March 7, 2004	June 6, 2004	12.3	24
4	21	September 26, 2004	May 15, 2005	11.7	30
5	21	September 25, 2005	May 7, 2006	10.9	40
6	17	January 14, 2007	May 16, 2007	7.2	81

== Episodes ==
=== Season 1 (2001–02) ===
No. overall	No. in season	Title	Directed by	Written by	Original release date	Prod. code	US viewers (millions)
1	1	"Pilot"	Allan Arkush	Tim Kring	September 24, 2001	64301	15.74
After being recently rehired by the Boston Medical Examiner's Office, Jordan investigates the death of a young woman who appears to be heavily tied to a famous politician who recently died.
2	2	"The Dawn of a New Day"	Allan Arkush	Tim Kring	October 1, 2001	64302	14.17
Two seemingly unconnected men turn up dead, but there is more than meets the eye to this case. Elsewhere Mr. Stinky has Bug and Trey stumped at identifying him
3	3	"The Ties That Bind"	Andy Wolk	Ian Biederman	October 8, 2001	64303	13.26
A woman’s torso is found and linked back to the prison system. Jordan is assigned to find out who the victim is and who is responsible for her death.
4	4	"Born to Run"	Allan Arkush	Damon Lindelof	October 15, 2001	64305	12.47
With what appears to be a cut and dry murder suicide Jordan gets help from her colleagues to find the truth. Meanwhile Dr. Macy faces the hard truth about his daughter.
5	5	"You Can't Go Home Again"	Donna Deitch	Samantha Howard Corbin	October 22, 2001	64304	12.25
When the body of a firefighter is found Jordan is called to the scene. What she discovers will shock her and set her on a mission.
6	6	"Believers"	Ian Toynton	Todd Ellis Kessler	October 29, 2001	64306	12.21
Facts are scarce when a Senator’s daughter is found stabbed in the park. Jordan must cut through the political red tape to find the answers. Back at the morgue Bug and Nigel face some hard choices.
7	7	"Sight Unseen"	Dick Lowry	Gary Glasberg	November 12, 2001	64307	12.58
Two school children are kidnapped and one of them turns up dead. Jordan must race against the clock to try to find the other child...before time runs out.
8	8	"Digger: Part 1"	Ian Toynton	Diane Ademu-John	November 19, 2001	64308	12.05
The discovery of a floating corpse forces Jordan into a nationwide manhunt for a serial killer as she teams up with a famed FBI criminal profiler and reunites with an unscrupulous reporter.
9	9	"Digger: Part 2"	Allan Arkush	Jill Blotevogel	November 26, 2001	64309	12.00
Jordan buries herself into the case and winds up putting her life in danger. Elsewhere Nigel and Lily plan some nuptials?
10	10	"Blue Christmas"	Donna Deitch	Ian Biederman & Samantha Howard Corbin	December 10, 2001	64310	11.42
When a cop killer dies in police custody Dr. Macy orders a coroners inquest to get answers. Elsewhere, Trey wonders what all Nigel’s invite to the mountains will involve.
11	11	"Wrong Place, Wrong Time"	Rick Rosenthal	Damon Lindelof	January 7, 2002	64311	12.43
With a botched robbery victims are many and answers are few. Jordan and Dr. Macy set out to prove maybe this was no ordinary bank robbery.
12	12	"Blood Relatives"	Arvin Brown	Todd Ellis Kessler & Gary Glasberg	January 14, 2002	64312	12.76
A mother and her two young sons turn up murdered, the only suspect being the husband. This case will do more than test Jordan’s skills as a pathologist - it will also test her mentally as some memories come flooding back.
13	13	"Miracles & Wonders"	Allan Arkush	Tim Kring	January 21, 2002	64313	14.05
Elvis has entered the building? Dr. Macy attempts to save a deer at his daughters’ request. And Jordan ponders the existence of a higher power.
14	14	"Four Fathers"	Rachel Talalay	Diane Ademu-John	January 28, 2002	64314	12.26
With the morgue pinching pennies the staff wonders who will be “pink slipped”. Elsewhere Jordan works a case involving the son of an old family...friend.
15	15	"Acts of Mercy"	Alex Zakrzewski	Elizabeth Sarnoff	February 4, 2002	64315	12.66
What appear to be mercy killings are turning up one after the other in Boston. Dr. Macy and Jordan are both tracking a doctor with a deadly needle. Bug and Nigel audition for a network.
16	16	"Lost and Found"	Donna Deitch	Clifton Campbell	February 25, 2002	64316	13.16
Jordan and Detective Winslow find a young father murdered in an alley, they race to find the baby. Dr. Macy must find out why a student died, as well as help Abby deal with the loss.
17	17	"Crime & Punishment"	Allan Arkush	Damon Lindelof	March 4, 2002	64317	12.95
A housewife from the suburbs is found dead, and linked to Sado-masochism which leads Jordan to an internet site. Elsewhere Bug sees the shrink to talk about the case of an 8-year-old boy.
18	18	"With Honor"	Donna Deitch	Gary Glasberg	March 18, 2002	64318	12.34
One of America's finest abandons her post in Afghanistan and is later found dead in Boston. Jordan is paired with an investigator from the Marines, to investigate the case. Elsewhere Dr. Macy is in the middle of a turf war...between pimps.
19	19	"For Harry, with Love and Squalor"	Ian Toynton	Tim Kring	April 8, 2002	64319	13.05
With gangsters on his tail, Dr. Macy’s father makes a surprise visit to Boston. Elsewhere Jordan meets a stranger in her dad’s bar. What repercussions will this latest fling have?
20	20	"The Gift of Life"	Arvin Brown	Ian Biederman	April 15, 2002	64320	12.98
In this episode we go back to 1995 when Jordan wonders if being a heart surgeon is the right career for her. But after a patient dies on the table because of Dr. McCaffrey's negligence, Jordan realizes that it is always best to tell the truth, even if it hurts somebody.
21	21	"Someone to Count On"	Nick Gomez	Barbara Ellis Nance	April 29, 2002	64321	16.29
When the mother of a teenage girl is found dead the daughter becomes the prime suspect. Jordan is convinced of the girls’ innocence and seeks advice from an unlikely source to save the girl from prison.
22	22	"Secrets & Lies: Part 1"	Michael Gershman	Elizabeth Sarnoff	May 6, 2002	64322	14.42
Jordan is called to a local psychiatric hospital to investigate a suicide. While there an unknown source provides her with a clue to her mother’s murder.
23	23	"Secrets & Lies: Part 2"	Allan Arkush	Tim Kring	May 13, 2002	64323	14.76
Sparked by a mysterious gift, Jordan agrees to dig into a 10-year-old triple homicide in exchange for help from a catatonic mental patient to learn the truth behind her mother's murder.

=== Season 2 (2002–03) ===
No. overall	No. in season	Title	Directed by	Written by	Original release date	Prod. code	US viewers (millions)
24	1	"There's No Place Like Home"	Allan Arkush	Tim Kring	September 23, 2002	02001	10.54
Jordan and Woody are 3000 miles from Boston on the trail of the man that may hold the answer to Jordan's questions about her mothers' death. Dr. Macy is struggling with the disappearance of Jordan and trying to solve a case of his own. Note: This episode originally aired as a 90 minute season premiere.
25	2	"Bombs Away"	Ian Toynton	Ian Biederman	September 30, 2002	02002	9.79
When the wife of a former ATF agent is found dead, the husband’s grief is overwhelming, and will take drastic measures and put everyone in the morgue in danger.
26	3	"The Truth Is Out There"	Tony Wharmby	David Amann	October 7, 2002	02003	10.49
Jordan and Nigel are making a trip to the local Total-Mart, and end up with a dead door greeter. When someone tries to steal the body the case takes an unusual turn.
27	4	"Pay Back"	Leslie Libman	Kathy McCormick	October 14, 2002	02004	11.36
After a high class party girl dies in custody, Woody will face possible charges. Jordan must step up and defend Woody and try to help save his career. Elsewhere Lily is trying to help a little boy.
28	5	"As If by Fate"	Michael Zinberg	Gary Glasberg	October 21, 2002	02005	11.56
Jordan tries her hand at dating and is later called to the scene of her would-be suitor’s apparent suicide. A near death experience leaves Nigel asking many questions. Dr. Macy sets out to help validate a recently departed jazz legend's personal image.
29	6	"One Twelve (Upon the Wasted Building)"	Allan Arkush	Damon Lindelof	November 11, 2002	02007	9.87
Jordan and the team are sent to lead the recovery effort at the site of an explosion. Amongst the rubble is a lone survivor and Jordan must keep him talking till help can get to him. The grim task of identifying the victims falls on Dr. Macy.
30	7	"Scared Straight"	Arvin Brown	Elizabeth Sarnoff	November 18, 2002	02006	11.27
When the lover of a controversial lesbian talk show host is found dead, Jordan and Woody lead the investigation. Garret and Lily go head to head when a cancer patient dies.
31	8	"Don't Look Back"	Ian Toynton	Tim Kring	December 2, 2002	02008	11.78
Jordan and Woody are off to California when the body of a Hollywood starlet is found in Boston. Elsewhere Dr. Macy and Lily both get visits at the morgue.
32	9	"Prisoner Exchange"	Michael Gershman	Ian Biederman	December 9, 2002	02010	11.65
Not willing to breach confidentiality Lily makes a sacrifice to keep a late night confession secret. Elsewhere Dr. Macy and D.A. Walcott are forced to work together to put a sexual predator behind bars.
33	10	"Ockham's Razor"	Allan Arkush	Story by : Damon Lindelof & Lizzy Shaw; Teleplay by : Damon Lindelof & Tim Kring	January 6, 2003	02011	12.23
When the wife of Dr. Macy’s nemesis is found dead...he pushes forward for the truth. A photo lab is going out of business and calling old customers the Cavanaugh’s are on the receiving end. What comes to light will push Max to face a truth he has tried to hide.
34	11	"Family Ties"	Ian Toynton	Kathy McCormick	January 13, 2003	02012	13.32
A woman is shot in an apparent car jacking; Jordan and Elaine make an unlikely team investigating this one. When a baby is found clinging to life under the mother, her husband claims the child is not his.
35	12	"Perfect Storm"	Stephen Williams	Christopher Barbour & Kiri Zooper	January 27, 2003	02013	11.30
Boston is at the mercy of a blizzard and the morgue staff at the mercy of an unknown toxin. With bodies piling up, and the lights out, the race is on stop this invisible killer before too many more die.
36	13	"Strangled"	Michael Gershman	Gary Glasberg	February 3, 2003	02015	9.76
The morgue staff gathers to attempt to try and solve a case from 1964. With each of the staff members assuming a role in the case, with Max leading the way.
37	14	"Wild Card"	Jesús Salvador Treviño	Diane Ademu-John	February 10, 2003	02014	10.70
A witness for an up coming case is found murdered. Jordan is sure there is a dirty cop involved in the permanent silencing of this witness. Meanwhile Dr. Macy and Dr. Winslow head an investigation of their own.
38	15	"John Doe"	Tim Hunter	David Amann	February 24, 2003	02009	11.30
When a John Doe comes into the morgue...Bug makes it a mission of his to find this mans identity. Dr. Macy sets out to try to prove murder or suicide when a cop turns up dead.
39	16	"Conspiracy"	Michael Zinberg	Shintaro Shimosawa & James Morris	March 17, 2003	02016	11.91
A mysterious death captures Jordan’s attention. Meanwhile, Dr. Macy revisits his past with a current case involving a former friend.
40	17	"Cruel and Unusual"	Michael Gershman	Elizabeth Sarnoff	March 31, 2003	02018	10.14
A local woman dies and forces Jordan to come face to face with an ex-lover. Dr. Macy and D.A. Walcott make a trip to investigate if an execution was cruel and unusual.
41	18	"Fire and Ice"	Arvin Brown	Kathy McCormick & Diane Ademu-John	April 7, 2003	02019	11.82
A methamphetamine lab explodes and takes the life of a young girl. Jordan tried to help the grieving mother and manages to tick off the D.A. Elsewhere, Lily and Bug work a case together.
42	19	"Dead Wives Club"	Donna Deitch	David Amann & Ian Biederman	April 14, 2003	02020	10.24
A woman is kidnapped and thirteen years later her body washes up in Boston. Jordan is convinced the killer is the husband, but the evidence does not support her theory. Meanwhile, Dr. Winslow had to identify a body at the morgue.
43	20	"Sunset Division"	Allan Arkush	Damon Lindelof & Tim Kring	April 21, 2003	02017	10.39
Woody decides to take some time off and goes home to Wisconsin, while there the Sheriff, his mentor is killed. The trail leads him to Los Angeles where he crosses paths with a special LAPD unit.
44	21	"Pandora's Trunk: Part 1"	Stephen Williams	Damon Lindelof & Gary Glasberg	April 28, 2003	02021	10.09
Three people are found dead and seem to have no connection to each other. Woody takes on the task of solving the triple homicide. Meanwhile, Jordan is back on the trail of her mother's killer when some new evidence surfaces.
45	22	"Pandora's Trunk: Part 2"	Allan Arkush	Tim Kring	May 5, 2003	02022	9.86
With many questions regarding her mother's death answered, Jordan, however, is still left with more questions and will stop at nothing to find the complete truth.

=== Season 3 (2004) ===
Following the conclusion of the second season, Crossing Jordan went on hiatus to accommodate lead actress Jill Hennessy's pregnancy. As a result, the third season was delayed until March 2004 and shortened to 13 episodes, many of which aired out of chronological order.

No. overall	No. in season	Title	Directed by	Written by	Original release date	Prod. code	US viewers (millions)
46	1	"Devil May Care"	Allan Arkush	Andi Bushell & Jim Praytor	March 7, 2004	03004	12.79
A teenager’s obsession with forensic science will cost two men their lives and put Dr. Macy’s skills to the test. Meanwhile Jordan thinks she might have heard a murder upstairs.
47	2	"Slam Dunk"	Michael Gershman	Kathy McCormick & Sharon Lee Watson	March 12, 2004	03006	9.69
Jordan is called for jury duty in the case of an alleged cop killer. With the D.A. pushing for quick results and Jordan examining the evidence...tension mounts. Only one woman can be correct, which lands Dr. Macy in the middle.
48	3	"'Til Death Do Us Part"	Michael Gershman	Damon Lindelof & Tim Kring	March 14, 2004	03003	12.79
A woman is beaten to death and her husband is the prime suspect. Evidence surfaces she was having an affair and Jordan must turn to an old friend for some secret answers. Meanwhile, Dr. Macy has a potential black widow on his hands.
49	4	"Is That Plutonium in Your Pocket, or Are You Just Happy to See Me?"	Michael Gershman	Story by : Tim Kring & Bob Melisso; Teleplay by : Tim Kring	March 19, 2004	03008	11.24
It is the first day at the office for new resident, Devan Maguire. With nothing to do she takes it upon herself to notify next of kin of a man found dead. When traces of a highly volatile chemical are found on the dead man, the case takes an even stranger turn.
50	5	"Dead or Alive"	Stephen Williams	Story by : Aron Eli Coleite; Teleplay by : David Amann	March 21, 2004	03009	11.94
When a picture shows up for Dr. Macy he travels to Mexico to prove the identity of a killer. While in Boston Woody works the case from a different angle. When the investigation turns up a witness, she is not willing to talk.
51	6	"Second Chances"	Allan Arkush	Kathy McCormick	March 28, 2004	03010	14.68
When the remains of a baby are found, proving the identity of the child will prove to be a difficult task. Elsewhere, a woman has fallen down some stairs was it an accident or murder.
52	7	"Missing Pieces"	Stephen Williams	David Amann	April 4, 2004	03002	12.94
Ten months ago, a young girl was kidnapped, now her suspected kidnapper turns up dead. However, the girl is missing.
53	8	"Most Likely"	Joyce Chopra	Gary Glasberg	April 18, 2004	03012	13.31
A young high school athlete dies after a drug bust. Jordan and Devan are sent to investigate, but they each have their own idea of what happened. Meanwhile, Woody lands his own case that puts his life at risk.
54	9	"All the News Fit to Print"	Allan Arkush	Kira Arne	April 25, 2004	03007	11.28
Dr. Macy attempts to help a hit and run victim who later dies at a local hospital. Dr. Macy is thrown into a wrongful death suit and must solve the case to protect his reputation. Elsewhere Woody and Bug are following their own case of a reporter found dead.
55	10	"Revealed"	Allan Arkush	Story by : Damon Lindelof; Teleplay by : Damon Lindelof & Tim Kring	May 9, 2004	03013	11.86
The body of a writer is found with bite marks in the neck and drained of all blood. Meanwhile a decomposing body is found in the woods and a camera in the hand of the victim is the only clue.
56	11	"He Said, She Said"	Michael Gershman	Andi Bushell & Jim Praytor	May 16, 2004	03011	12.64
A woman shoots and kills her attacker, Woody and Devan are convinced there is more to the story. Elsewhere a woman tries to convince Bug that an invasive autopsy is not needed for her husband, which sparks Bug's suspicions.
57	12	"Dead in the Water"	Stephen Williams	Gary Glasberg	May 23, 2004	03005	12.94
A young woman has been missing for seven years, and everyone is shocked when she washes up on shore after a storm. Elsewhere Dr. Macy and Bug take on the case of a surgeon who goes under the knife of another surgeon.
58	13	"Oh, Brother Where Art Thou?: Part 3"	Allan Arkush	Tim Kring	June 6, 2004	03001	11.60
When Tom Malden is found dead in Jordan’s apartment, Jordan is a suspect. However, Jordan was drugged and has no idea what has happened. When the truth comes out no one is more shocked than Jordan. Note: This episode directly follows "Pandora's Trunk: Part 2" and resolves the cliffhanger ending from that episode. NBC postponed it to avoid confusing new viewers after returning from a ten month hiatus.

=== Season 4 (2004–05) ===
No. overall	No. in season	Title	Directed by	Written by	Original release date	Prod. code	US viewers (millions)
59	1	"After Dark"	Jesús Salvador Treviño	Scott A. Williams	September 26, 2004	04002	12.55
A mysterious blackout blankets Boston, and leaves Jordan and Bug trapped in a tunnel.
60	2	"Out of Sight"	Roxann Dawson	Linda Gase	October 3, 2004	04004	12.85
A millionaire is found dead, and his neighbor quickly becomes a suspect. Only problem is, he has not left his house in years. Elsewhere, Macy and Lily have a show down with Homeland Security.
61	3	"Intruded"	Allan Arkush	Tim Kring	October 10, 2004	04001	12.45
After a night out with Woody, Jordan returns home and has an encounter with an intruder. In typical Jordan fashion, she hides this information and Dr. Stiles gets involved.
62	4	"Deja Past"	Michael Gershman	Andi Bushell	October 17, 2004	04003	12.52
When Jordan is called to a spooky house from her past to investigate a death, she uncovers a murder. With the memories from her childhood Jordan faces the truth of the spooky house. Meanwhile, Dr. Macy investigates the death of an Iraqi War veteran.
63	5	"Justice Delayed"	Dianne Houston	Kathy McCormick	October 24, 2004	04008	11.69
After a black man was murdered 40 years ago in the deep South, his son asks for Jordan’s help in finding the truth. With questions to answer Jordan faces difficulty from a community that is not interested in the truth.
64	6	"Blue Moon"	Allan Arkush	Story by : Tim Kring & Linda Gase; Teleplay by : Scott A. Willams & Robert Rovner & Jon Cowan	October 31, 2004	04009	12.69
With the phases of the Blue Moon determining how a killer acts, Woody and Jordan must work quickly to stop him before another victim dies. Elsewhere Lily finds the softer side of Detective Seely.
65	7	"What Happens in Vegas Dies in Boston"	Jesús Salvador Treviño	Robert Rovner & Jon Cowan	November 7, 2004	04006	14.38
When a jet from Las Vegas arrives with a dead man with three million dollars handcuffed to his wrist, Jordan and Woody have to eliminate the chaperones of murder. Meanwhile the rest of the team gets a shock when a 9-year-old girl confesses to the brutal murder of a high school boy. This episode begins a crossover with Las Vegas that concludes on "Two of a Kind".
66	8	"Fire from the Sky"	Allan Arkush	Scott A. Williams & Tim Kring	November 14, 2004	04005	13.76
A plane crash has occurred and the staff soon learns one of their own was on that flight.
67	9	"Necessary Risks"	Michael Gershman	Sharon Lee Watson	November 21, 2004	04007	14.03
When an up-and-coming fencing star allegedly commits suicide, tests soon indicate murder. Elsewhere, Dr. Macy is called to a scene of an organ harvest.
68	10	"A Stranger Among Us"	Jesús Salvador Treviño	Andi Bushell	January 2, 2005	04012	14.13
When a gunman opens fire on a local diner, the FBI knows it is related to a recently arrested drug lord. However, Jordan and Dr. Macy are less than convinced. After some investigating, they soon realize everything is not as it seems.
69	11	"Murder in the Rue Morgue"	Roxann Dawson	Linda Gase	January 9, 2005	04011	15.28
When a lone gunman decides to commit murder inside the morgue, Jordan wonders if there is a connection to any of the recent admits.
70	12	"Family Affair"	Tim Hunter	Kira Arne	January 30, 2005	04010	12.53
A young woman from a high class family is found dead in the woods, from an apparent accident. When evidence turns up that this is no accident, a movie will turn up a suspect. Elsewhere, Jordan looks into the death of a young man where the evidence does not add up.
71	13	"You Really Got Me"	Allan Arkush	Robert Rovner & Jon Cowan	February 13, 2005	04013	12.20
A guilty woman may be executed in Los Angeles for a crime Jordan helped put her away for. When evidence turns up in Boston that may exonerate her, Jordan and Woody are off to California.
72	14	"Gray Murders"	Roxann Dawson	Andrew Black	March 13, 2005	04014	13.34
When a passenger and a baggage handler die from an international flight, authorities are worried about an air borne pathogen. When Dr. Macy discovers it was a drug overdose, Woody starts the search for a drug smuggler. Meanwhile, Jordan, Bug, Lilly, and Seely look to correct a huge mistake made by Bug.
73	15	"It Happened One Night"	Miguel Ferrer	Tim Kring	March 20, 2005	04015	11.21
Jordan’s father returns to help stop a vendetta that he is all too familiar with. Meanwhile, Nigel and Bug are shooting for top honors, but a computer crash will leave them scrambling.
74	16	"Skin and Bone"	Stephen Williams	Scott A. Williams	March 27, 2005	04016	11.37
When a mass grave of the mob is found, the killer assaults Bug. Not long after the discovery Woody's brother shows up sparking some suspicion. Lily and Nigel stay at Bug's side waiting for him to wake up.
75	17	"Locard's Exchange"	Bethany Rooney	Kathy McCormick	April 10, 2005	04018	10.61
When a convicted killer is set to be released from prison Woody, Dr. Macy and Jordan race the clock to turn up new evidence. Jordan must decide how far she will go for this case, as she takes the stand for the prosecution.
76	18	"Sanctuary"	Michael Gershman	Aron Eli Coleite	April 24, 2005	04019	8.75
Jordan suspects foul play in the death of a man. When the wife of the dead man takes Jordan and others hostage Woody, Dr. Macy and the others race to solve the murder to save one of their own.
77	19	"Embraceable You"	Allan Arkush	Linda Gase & Robert Rovner & Jon Cowan	May 1, 2005	04017	10.90
When a pregnant nun is found dead, Jordan, Woody, and Nigel are thrown into this case of biblical proportions. Elsewhere, Dr. Macy is on the trail of a black widow.
78	20	"Forget Me Not"	Roxann Dawson	Story by : Steve Valentine & Scott A. Williams & Tim Kring; Teleplay by : Scott A. Williams & Tim Kring	May 8, 2005	04020	11.60
Nigel is spending the evening with his new soul mate when her daughter ends up kidnapped. Nigel is left with questions that science cannot answer. A man thought to be dead awakens on the autopsy table.
79	21	"Jump Push Fall"	Allan Arkush	Story by : Linda Gase & Aron Eli Coleite and Robert Rovner & Jon Cowan; Teleplay by : Linda Gase & Robert Rovner & Jon Cowan	May 15, 2005	04021	12.62
Some new evidence comes to light in an old case that involves Dr. Macy. Jordan is placed in charge of the case that will either make or break Dr. Macy. Meanwhile, Woody is hot on the trail of a cop killer, and Woody finds himself looking down the barrel of a gun.

=== Season 5 (2005–06) ===
No. overall	No. in season	Title	Directed by	Written by	Original release date	Prod. code	US viewers (millions)
80	1	"There's No Place Like Home II"	Roxann Dawson	Tim Kring & Robert Rovner & Jon Cowan	September 25, 2005	05001	13.09
With a familiar killer in their midst, Slocum is forced to get help from an unlikely source.
81	2	"Luck Be a Lady"	Allan Arkush	Rob Fresco	October 2, 2005	05005	12.39
When a pair of bodies ends up in the Boston Morgue, one clue will lead to fabulous Las Vegas. This episode begins a crossover with Las Vegas that concludes on "Double Down, Triple Threat".
82	3	"Under the Weather"	Roxann Dawson	Tim Kring & Robert Rovner & Jon Cowan	October 9, 2005	05004	12.90
Jordan’s defiance of Dr. Macy ends up putting her own life in danger. With three boys missing and bodies turning up, Woody and Dr. Macy don’t realize they are also searching for one of their own.
83	4	"Judgement Day"	Allan Arkush	Kathy McCormick	October 16, 2005	05002	11.22
Jordan works to expose the downfalls of the prison health care system, when an inmate turns up dead. Meanwhile Lily is put into a life or death situation at a local court house.
84	5	"Enlightenment"	Bethany Rooney	Linda Gase	October 23, 2005	05003	12.08
With the murder of a young boy and his mother, Jordan will go undercover to find this killer. Elsewhere, Lily and Bug have a hard decision to make over bodily fluids.
85	6	"Total Recall"	Ernest Dickerson	Emily Whitesell	October 30, 2005	05006	12.48
With a suspect that has confessed Woody thinks the hard work is done. Only problem this suspect has no recollection of committing the murder. With the help of the new psychologist, Woody will learn all is not what it seems.
86	7	"Road Kill"	Roxann Dawson	Melissa R. Byer & Treena Hancock	November 27, 2005	05007	11.06
A copy cat killer starts to terrorize Boston, Woody and Jordan are left to break the case. When they have to turn to the original killer for answers, Jordan is less than comfortable when the killer starts to get personal.
87	8	"A Man in Blue"	Jonathan Kaplan	Story by : Tim Kring & Jason Ning; Teleplay by : Rob Fresco & Jason Ning	December 4, 2005	05008	12.56
With a cop killer on the loose, Woody is flooded with memories. It is left to Woody to find a killer at any cost. Meanwhile, aliens spark Nigel’s interests.
88	9	"Death Goes On"	Roxann Dawson	Kathy McCormick & Aron Eli Coleite	December 11, 2005	05009	11.40
With only traces of evidence Woody and Dr. Macy are looking to bring down a mob hit man. Elsewhere Jordan is called to the scene of an accident, with the body missing. This new case will lead to answers for an old case.
89	10	"Loves Me Not"	Allan Arkush	Robert Rovner & Jon Cowan	January 8, 2006	05010	12.03
Jordan and Woody are called to the scene of a murder at a bed and breakfast. It isn’t long before everyone is a suspect. When the road gets snowed in...things heat up between Jordan and Woody.
90	11	"The Elephant in the Room"	Bethany Rooney	Joe Pokaski	January 15, 2006	05011	10.83
Dr. Macy's job may be at risk due to a DUI charge, the night before he is supposed to testify as a witness in a high profile case. Jordan and Woody wonder where their relationship will go next.
91	12	"Code of Ethics"	Miguel Ferrer	Linda Gase	January 22, 2006	05012	11.10
Jordan and Woody investigate the death of two soldiers. One was killed in Iraq, the other has been killed in Boston. Dr. Macy confronts his daughter over her choice in boyfriends and a possible addiction to drugs. Jordan discovers a secret J.D. is keeping.
92	13	"Dreamland"	Karen Gaviola	Rob Fresco	January 29, 2006	05013	11.22
Macy is stunned when he discovers that a body from a gang related shooting is his daughters boyfriend. When a gun from the crime scene returns with Abby's prints on it, the entire team focuses on finding the missing girl.
93	14	"Death Toll"	Allan Arkush	Melissa R. Byer & Treena Hancock	March 12, 2006	05014	10.54
A bomb has detonated on a Boston train, leaving many victims dead or injured. A lot of the victims are school aged children which triggers bad memories for everyone. Meanwhile, another bomb lies somewhere in Boston.
94	15	"Blame Game"	Miguel Ferrer	Story by : Aron Eli Coleite & Jason Ning; Teleplay by : Kathy McCormick	March 19, 2006	05016	10.18
A brush fire rages and some firemen lose their lives. With some investigation the team finds some evidence that will post to a loose link in the chain of command. Macy tries to keep his daughter in rehab.
95	16	"Someone to Watch Over Me"	Aaron Lipstadt	Emily Whitesell	March 26, 2006	05015	10.55
A father is murdered and his daughter becomes a target of an assassin, stirring some hard memories for Jordan. Elsewhere, a high profile family makes life hard for Dr. Macy when their son is killed in a tragic accident.
96	17	"Save Me"	Allan Arkush	Linda Gase	April 9, 2006	05017	11.44
Woody and Lu team up to find the killer of a young girl, with the possibility of the killer being mentally ill and living in a halfway house the search will prove difficult. Jordan has taken in Kayla, while the state tries to find a home for her.
97	18	"Thin Ice"	Donna Deitch	Robert Rovner & Jon Cowan	April 16, 2006	05018	12.61
A pro baseball player is accused of rape. Nigel sets out to find the family of a fighter pilot who has been discovered frozen. With Woody and Lu's relationship growing, Jordan's jealousy grows.
98	19	"Mysterious Ways"	Miguel Ferrer	Lawrence Meyers	April 23, 2006	05019	11.48
A supposed miracle worker dies, and Woody and Jordan work the case. Elsewhere, while in the process of breaking and entering, a man dies.
99	20	"Mace vs. Scalpel"	Bethany Rooney	Rob Fresco	April 30, 2006	05020	9.31
While attempting to return some personal effects Dr. Macy makes a startling discovery. Jordan and Lu butt heads over the morgue janitor, and Lily prepares for the wedding.
100	21	"Don't Leave Me This Way"	Allan Arkush	Story by : Melissa R. Byer & Treena Hancock; Teleplay by : Linda Gase & Robert Rovner	May 7, 2006	05021	10.66
When Jordan wakes up to find J.D. dead beside her, she has no memory of the events from the previous night. Accused of murder, Jordan will turn to her friends to help piece everything together.

=== Season 6 (2007) ===
No. overall	No. in season	Title	Directed by	Written by	Original release date	Prod. code	US viewers (millions)
101	1	"Retribution"	Roxann Dawson	Story by : Robert Rovner & Jon Cowan; Teleplay by : Melissa R. Byer & Treena Hancock	January 14, 2007	06001	6.65
Lu investigates the mysterious death of Pollack with Jordan as the prime suspect. To find and save Jordan, Woody, Bug, Nigel and Macy must investigate their way to the truth, combating the law, politicians and each other.
102	2	"Shattered"	Donna Deitch	Lynne E. Litt	January 21, 2007	06002	7.57
A special prosecutor appears to audit the department, Jordan skirts the law trying to catch a pedophile, and Woody is horrified when pieces of a woman are found scattered along the highway, and no one seems to care.
103	3	"33 Bullets"	John Badham	Rob Fresco	January 28, 2007	06003	7.92
The death of a young boy at police hands sends the city into chaos after a rushed hearing, and puts someone at risk as various team members go out to gather more evidence or make their way back to the morgue on foot.
104	4	"Crazy Little Thing Called Love"	Roxann Dawson	Rob Wright	February 11, 2007	06005	8.06
A boxer's death within hours of him winning the bout leaves Jordan and Woody scrambling for motive, and Bug's case of a 20-year-old skeleton proves difficult both to identify and to work with Lily. Danny McCoy and Delinda Deline (from Las Vegas) help out with the case.
105	5	"Mr. Little and Mr. Big"	Ravi Kapoor	Kathy McCormick	February 18, 2007	06004	7.02
Woody deals with a murdered teenager and a narco cop who has no problem bending rules in his quest for busts, meanwhile Lily and Jordan have a disappearing corpse.
106	6	"Night of the Living Dead"	Allan Arkush	Jason Ning	February 25, 2007	06006	6.74
In a triple shooting a defense attorney was shot and presumed dead, however he is actually still alive. Macy has to do his autopsy, but keeps putting it off because of their prior relationship. The morgue struggles under Ivers' new restrictions.
107	7	"Hubris"	Roxann Dawson	Melissa R. Byer & Treena Hancock	March 7, 2007	06008	8.08
A serial killer using the alias "The Hangman" taunts Nigel on Nigel's own blog, and challenges Nigel, and the rest of the team, to find him before he kills again.
108	8	"Isolation"	Bethany Rooney	Ashley Gable	March 14, 2007	06007	7.39
After defying William Ivers and performing an autopsy on an immigrant, a deadly viral outbreak is revealed as the Medical Examiner's team races to find the source of the virus before all of Boston is infected.
109	9	"Seven Feet Under"	Kate Woods	Brian Ross	March 21, 2007	06009	6.15
Dr. Switzer is asked to determine the cause of death for a mummy, but the results are surprising; Jordan and Garret work the case of a young girl buried in another's grave; and Jordan begins to have even more neurological difficulties.
110	10	"Fall From Grace"	Craig Ross, Jr.	Brett Mahoney	March 28, 2007	06010	7.02
Woody and Jordan team up to investigate a pregnant woman's murder and her missing fetus. Dr. Macy gives a tour of the morgue to some juveniles that need to be scared straight.
111	11	"Faith"	Donna Deitch	Robert Rovner & Jon Cowan	April 4, 2007	06011	7.57
Woody and Jordan team up to locate a hijacked school bus that is full of children. Elsewhere, the lifeless body of Santa shows up at the morgue; and Jordan's secret is finally revealed as her peers become concerned for her health.
112	12	"Sleeping Beauty"	Bethany Rooney	Rob Fresco	April 11, 2007	06012	6.22
Dr. Macy accompanies Jordan to the hospital where she is to undergo brain surgery. Woody sets out to keep his mind busy by investigating a murder with an eyewitness who is about to testify in court.
113	13	"Post Hoc Ergo Propter Hoc"	Jill Hennessy	Kathy McCormick & Lynne E. Litt	April 18, 2007	06013	6.80
Everyone's babysitting Jordan in rotation, but when Bug goes missing it further strains the M.E.'s office and a new detective who just wants to prove his case.
114	14	"In Sickness & In Health"	Donna Deitch	Melissa R. Byer & Treena Hancock & Jason Ning	April 25, 2007	06014	6.37
Jordan returns to work early and energized, convinced she's a changed person. Kate and Woody work a case where a groom was gunned down at his wedding, and Bug, Jordan and Elliot try to find who killed a good Samaritan. Meanwhile, Bug is still reeling from what happened to him.
115	15	"Dead Again"	John Badham	Rob Wright & Jim Danger Gray	May 2, 2007	06015	5.95
A woman thought dead for ten years shows up only a few hours dead, and Ivers asks for a favor; elsewhere, Lily and Jeffrey's therapist dies in front of them.
116	16	"D.O.A."	Curtis A. Schnell	Rob Fresco	May 9, 2007	06016	5.34
A man who's been poisoned asks Woody and Jordan to find his missing daughter; Kate and Nigel work to solve the mystery of magicians who killed each other.
117	17	"Crash"	Roxann Dawson	Ashley Gable & Robert Rovner & Jon Cowan	May 16, 2007	06017	6.44
The team is stranded in the mountains after their plane crashes.
