= Defiance season 3 =

Defiance
- Season 3
- Season 3 DVD cover
- No. of episodes: 13

Release
- Original network: Syfy
- Original release: June 12 – August 28, 2015

Season chronology
- ← Previous; Season 2

The third and final season of the American science fiction television series Defiance premiered on Syfy on June 12, 2015, concluded on August 28, 2015, and consisted a total of 13 episodes. The show stars Grant Bowler, Julie Benz, Stephanie Leonidas, Tony Curran, Jaime Murray, Graham Greene, Jesse Rath, Anna Hopkins and Nichole Galicia.

The series is produced by Universal Cable Productions, in transmedia collaboration with Trion Worlds, who have released an MMORPG video game of the same name which is tied into the series.

== Cast ==
=== Main ===
- Grant Bowler as Joshua Nolan
- Julie Benz as Amanda Rosewater
- Stephanie Leonidas as Irisa Nyira
- Tony Curran as Datak Tarr
- Jaime Murray as Stahma Tarr
- Graham Greene as Rafe McCawley (Note: Greene is only credited for the episodes he appears in.)
- Jesse Rath as Alak Tarr
- Anna Hopkins as Jessica "Berlin" Rainer
- Nichole Galicia as Kindzi (Note: Galicia was promoted to series regular starting with episode 5, "History Rhymes". She was previously credited as a guest in the first two episodes.)

=== Special guest ===
- James Murray as Niles Pottinger

=== Recurring ===
- Trenna Keating as Doc Yewll
- Dewshane Williams as Tommy LaSalle
- Justin Rain as Quentin McCawley
- Nicole Muñoz as Christie McCawley Tarr
- Linda Hamilton as Pilar McCawley
- Douglas Nyback as Sgt. Frei Poole
- Lee Tergesen as General Rahm Tak
- Conrad Coates as T'evgin
- Billy MacLellan as Lieutenant Bebe
- Tony Nappo as Indur
- Rainbow Sun Francks as Uno
- Demore Barnes as Dos

=== Guest ===
- Ian Ziering as Conrad Von Bach
- Wendy Crewson as Silora Voske

== Episodes ==
No. overall	No. in season	Title	Directed by	Written by	Original release date	US viewers (millions)
27	1	"The World We Seize"	Michael Nankin	Kevin Murphy	June 12, 2015	1.11
Seven months after the mines collapsed, Defiance is in hard times, with severe power shortages, unemployment, and the stasis net being turned off periodically. Doc Yewll is determined to leave Defiance to find a better life, but Amanda convinces her to stay, for the town. Irisa and Nolan are freed from their pod by two unknown purple-skinned aliens, who arrived in Defiance to mine gulanite. Datak, Stahma, and Rafe continue to track Pilar and Rafe's kidnapped daughter and grandchild, when they run into a Votanis Collective group, run by General Rahm Tahk, a vicious leader who plans to head to Defiance, murder every human, and burn the town to the ground.
28	2	"The Last Unicorns"	Michael Nankin	Kari Drake	June 12, 2015	1.11
After Stahma and Rahm Tak murder the McCawleys, Alak escapes with his son. Pilar helps them, finding a trailer and killing the occupants to vacate it. When Alak awakens in the middle of the night, Pilar and his son are gone. Doc Yewll becomes frightened once the purple-skin is brought to her, describing it as Omec, a vicious race that devours those it conquers. She reluctantly mends the Omec, while her father, T'evgin, converses with Amanda to strike a proposition - she will return his daughter, but only if they share the gulanite. Outside of Defiance, Stahma and Datak are forced to comply with Rahm Tak's orders for them to become spies once he reveals that he has Alak captive.
29	3	"Broken Bough"	Larry Shaw	Todd Slavkin & Darren Swimmer	June 19, 2015	0.88
Nolan and Irisa take a patrol outside Defiance to determine the size of Rahm Tak's force, and they run into Pilar and Luke on their way. Pilar attempts to trick them, but Nolan works out who she is, with Rafe's boots and a half-Castithan baby. When Nolan finds out that Rahm Tak has missiles capable of breaching the stasis net, he begins to take action to destroy them. These plans are disrupted when Pilar escapes from Nolan's bonds, and ends up being shot. Still, Nolan and Irisa manage to destroy the weapon that would have broken through the stasis net. Irisa has the chance to kill Rahm Tak, but knocks him out instead; Nolan is furious that she let this very dangerous man escape to continue his war on Defiance. In Defiance, Datak and Stahma receive orders from Rahm Tak to carry out his plans, while Stahma begins to become "friendly" with the Omec T'evgin.
30	4	"Dead Air"	Larry Shaw	Gregory Weidman & Geoff Tock	June 26, 2015	1.16
After Amanda and Berlin find out that the weapons of Defiance are destroyed after a shrill attack, Amanda and Nolan leave to hunt down replacement weapons. They arrive at an old hidden arms storage facility, only to find Niles Pottinger, where he's living the good life. He reveals that he is still in love with Amanda, but she soon realizes that he was the man who attacked and raped her years ago in New York. The storage facility ends up being destroyed by a singularity bomb. Stahma and Datak receive orders from Rahm Tak to destroy the St. Louis Arch, which they follow through with, and Stahma attempts her orders to assassinate T'evgin.
31	5	"History Rhymes"	Felix Alcala	Anupam Nigam	July 3, 2015	1.28
Nolan and Irisa both collapse, and meet each other in a dream state, where incidents that occurred to either one or both of them in the past present themselves to the two. Nolan finds out that Irisa was going to kill him when she was younger because he apparently frightened her; the information damages his trust in her. Amanda and Doc Yewell attempt to get help from T'evgin to find Nolan and Irisa, and Yewll manages to heal them, or at least fix the alien hardware inside their brains. Datak and Stahma attempt to prepare a more decisive move against Rahm Tak to take him down, while Alak escapes and returns home, furious at Stahma for having murdered Christie.
32	6	"Where the Apples Fell"	Felix Alcala	Paula Yoo	July 10, 2015	1.07
Datak and Stahma flee from their home after Alak reveals their complicity in helping Rahm's forces and sabotaging Defiance.
33	7	"The Beauty of Our Weapons"	Mairzee Almas	Manuel Figueroa & Jordan Heimer	July 17, 2015	1.11
A visiting arms dealer, Conrad von Bach (who has a past relationship with Berlin) arrives in Defiance with a deal, which is to provide arms to Defiance for free... Conrad manages to convince Berlin to leave Defiance with him before the Votanis Collective arrive. Meanwhile, Nolan recruits a militia to fight the oncoming Votanis Collective army, but the people of Defiance need convincing to fight what may be an unwinnable war. Irisa inspires the militia. Datak and Alak have a confrontation in jail after Datak is captured. After being given shelter by T'evgin, Stahma is shown by Kindzi the Omecs' final endgame.
34	8	"My Name Is Datak Tarr and I Have Come to Kill You"	Mairzee Almas	Kevin Murphy	July 24, 2015	1.24
Some of Rahm's men infiltrate Defiance, killing many of Defiance's inhabitants and wounding others, including Alak and Irisa. Doc Yewell devises a suicide mission in which Datak carries a beacon into Rahm's camp. It is used to channel energy from the stasis net into a directed explosion, destroying the camp and those within. Datak succeeds in his role, securing a pardon for his wife, and although assumed dead, survives.
35	9	"Ostinato in White"	Allan Arkush	Bryan Q. Miller	July 31, 2015	1.00
A creature is stalking and hunting prey in Defiance. Nolan, who is suffering from remorse for the deaths of many of the Defiance citizens during the attack by the Votanis Collective, tries to investigate. It is later discovered that Kindzi is responsible for the deaths; after a confrontation with her father T'evgin, she is put into stasis on-board the Omec ship.
36	10	"When Twilight Dims the Sky Above"	Allan Arkush	Brian Allen Alexander	August 7, 2015	1.26
Silora Voske of the Votanis Collective arrives with a peace treaty to offer Amanda and Defiance. Nolan, with the Ark tech still messing with his mind, goes rogue and interrupts a cocktail gathering organized by Amanda and the Votanis Collective. He kills Silora and is captured by her men, after which Amanda is forced to let them take Nolan to stand trial for Silora's death. T'evgin, meanwhile, has to contend with his daughter Kindzi, who was freed by Doc Yewll; in a fight, Kindzi gains the upper hand by incapacitating T'evgin and holding him captive.
37	11	"Of a Demon in My View"	Thomas Burstyn	Nick Mueller	August 14, 2015	1.11
The Votanis Collective convoy taking Nolan to South America to stand trial for killing Silora is attacked by Kindzi, who abducts him. Berlin returns and rescues Irisa, who then track Nolan down and confronts Kindzi. Nolan manages to escape captivity and tries to rescue T'evgin, but Kindzi interrupts. In a battle with T'evgin, she kills him, and Nolan and Irisa escape. Kindzi, in a fit of rage, swears she will continue the Dread Harvest and avenge her father. With that, she travels aboard the Omec ship and begins to awaken her brothers and sisters.
38	12	"The Awakening"	Michael Nankin	Todd Slavkin & Darren Swimmer	August 21, 2015	1.13
Many Omec start arriving on Earth near Defiance on drop ships, and begin their Dread Harvest. Nolan and Amanda manage to free Doc Yewll from the mind control probe and start to free many of the prisoners Kindzi made Doc Yewll take captive. Datak, who is one of the prisoners, manages to escape. Meanwhile, Kindzi breaks into Alak's house, overpowering him and Stahma, and taking Alak's child.
39	13	"Upon the March We Fittest Die"	Michael Nankin	Kevin Murphy	August 28, 2015	1.17
Datak manages to save Stahma, Alak, and the baby from Kindzi by pinning her to the wall with a metal stake and proceeds to escape back to Defiance. Nolan and his crew devise a plan to stop the flow of Omec reinforcements into Defiance. Nolan goes with Doc Yewll, Irisa, and Datak to T'evgin's base and commandeer some drop ships, which take them up to the Omec mothership. Kindzi makes her way back up to the ship to intercept them. A struggle ensues, whereby Nolan manages to kill Kindzi by causing her to fall into the ship's engines. Nolan manages to get Irisa and Datak to leave, upon realising that he and Doc Yewll have to stay behind and take the ship out of Earth's orbit. The citizens of Defiance are later seen rebuilding the Arch and naming it in Nolan's honor for saving them from the Omec threat.

== Production ==
On September 25, 2014, Defiance was renewed for a 13-episode third season with the two-hour season premiere on June 12, 2015. Production commenced in Toronto in February 2015. Lee Tergesen, Conrad Coates, Nichole Galicia joined the cast in recurring roles for season 3 while Anna Hopkins was promoted to series regular.

== Ratings ==
Viewership and ratings per episode of Defiance season 3
No.	Title	Air date	Rating/share (18–49)	Viewers (millions)	DVR (18–49)	DVR viewers (millions)	Total (18–49)	Total viewers (millions)
1	"The World We Seize"	June 12, 2015	0.2	1.11	0.4	0.96	0.6	2.07
2	"The Last Unicorns"	June 12, 2015	0.2	1.11	0.4	0.96	0.6	2.07
3	"Broken Bough"	June 19, 2015	0.2	0.88	0.3	—N/a	0.5	—N/a
4	"Dead Air"	June 26, 2015	0.2	1.16	0.4	1.01	0.6	2.17
5	"History Rhymes"	July 3, 2015	0.4	1.28	—N/a	0.90	—N/a	2.18
6	"Where the Apples Fell"	July 10, 2015	0.3	1.07	0.3	0.88	0.6	1.95
7	"The Beauty of Our Weapons"	July 17, 2015	0.2	1.11	—N/a	—N/a	—N/a	—N/a
8	"My Name Is Datak Tarr and I Have Come to Kill You"	July 24, 2015	0.3	1.24	—N/a	—N/a	—N/a	—N/a
9	"Ostinato in White"	July 31, 2015	0.2	1.00	0.3	—N/a	0.5	—N/a
10	"When Twilight Dims the Sky Above"	August 7, 2015	0.3	1.26	0.3	—N/a	0.6	—N/a
11	"Of a Demon in My View"	August 14, 2015	0.2	1.11	0.4	1.01	0.6	2.12
12	"The Awakening"	August 21, 2015	0.2	1.13	—N/a	—N/a	—N/a	—N/a
13	"Upon the March We Fittest Die"	August 28, 2015	0.2	1.17	—N/a	—N/a	—N/a	—N/a
