= Dawn Wilkinson =

Canadian filmmaker

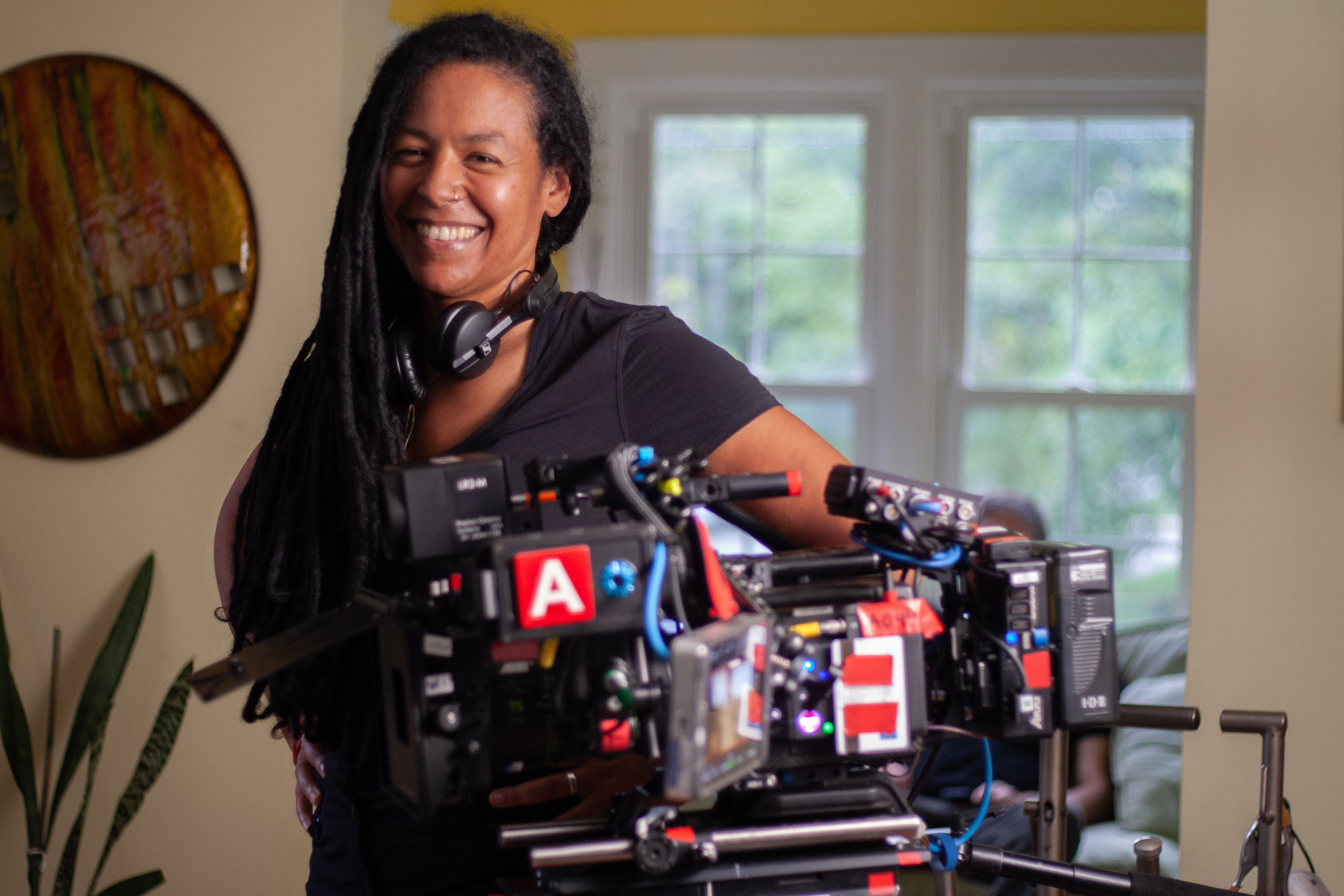
Wilkinson on the set of "Block Party”

Dawn Wilkinson is a Canadian film and television director based in LA.

== Early life and education ==
Dawn Wilkinson was born in Montreal, Quebec. When she was six weeks old, her family moved to Brampton, a suburb of Toronto, Ontario. About a year later, they moved to the town of Acton, Ontario, and five years later they returned to Brampton. Wilkinson attended SEED Alternative School (1992), the University of Toronto (1996), the Canadian Film Centre (2000) and the Short Dramatic Film Program (2000) where she directed Girls Who Say Yes (2000).

== Career ==
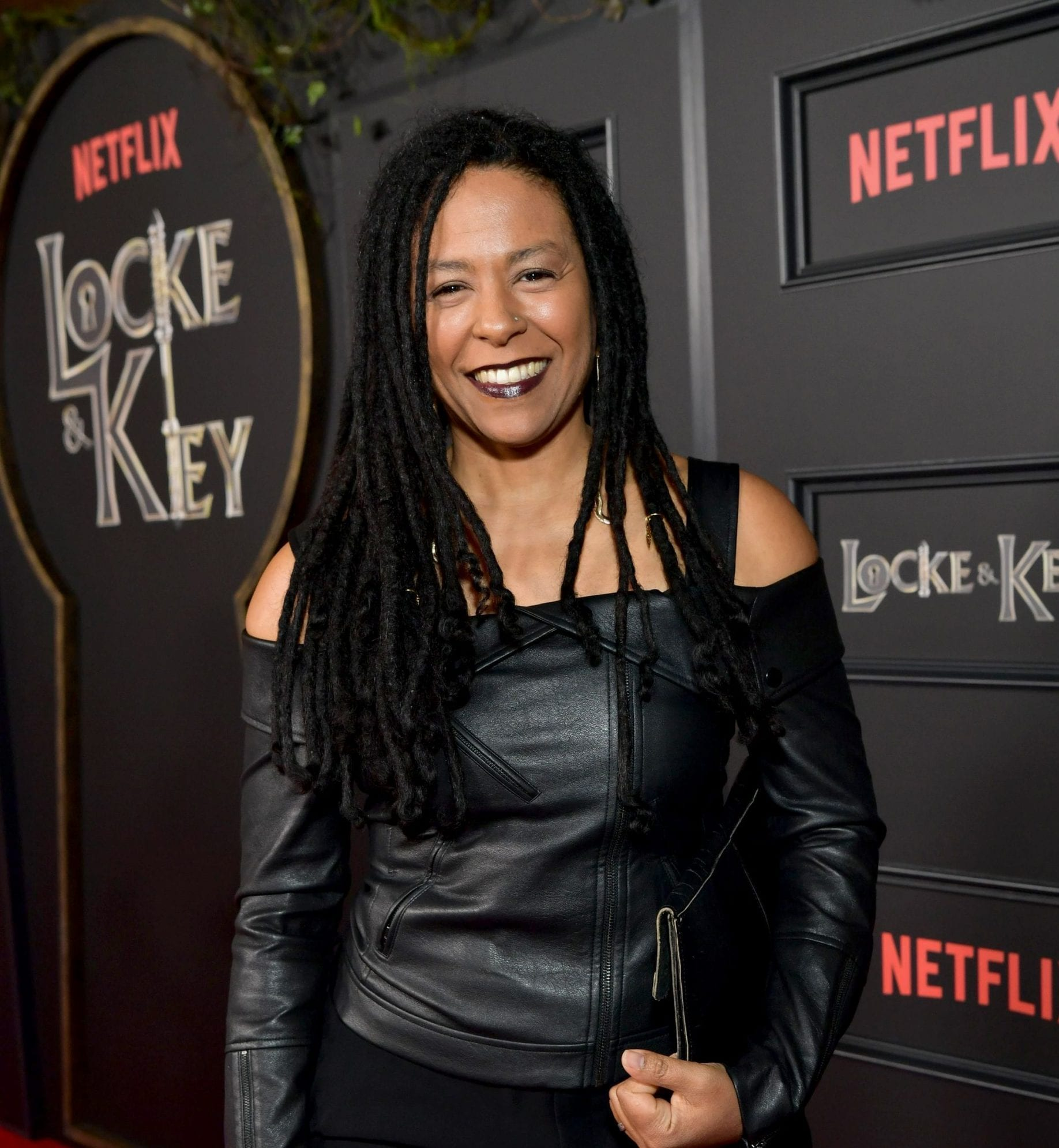
Wilkinson at the Locke & Key series premiere

Wilkinson is a director who apprenticed with Norman Jewison on the set of Hurricane, and taught filmmaking at Trebas Institute (1999-2001), the Toronto Film School (2001-2008), and Humber College (2009-2010). She was recruited by the National Film Board of Canada to teach local youth about filmmaking, and she went on to be the director of National Film Board short documentaries Youth Visions (2007).

Wilkinson directed the feature film "Devotion" and the short films "Instant Dread", "Dandelions", "Wilderness", and "Girls Who Say Yes." Being awarded the WIFT and DGC Emerging Television Director Award, she directed Canadian drama series "Heartland", "Murdoch Mysteries", and "Degrassi", which she was nominated for a DGC AWARD for Best Family TV Series, in addition to comedies "Sunnyside", and "Kim's Convenience" in which she was nominated for a Best Directing DGC Award.

In addition to being a member of the Directors Guild of Canada, and the Writers Guild of Canada, Wilkinson became a member of the Directors Guild of America and has directed television series including: "Empire", "How to Get Away with Murder", "All American", "All American: Homecoming", "Locke & Key", "Nashville", "Dynasty", "Greenleaf", "Riverdale", "Power Book II: Ghost", and the STARZ series "Step Up: High Water" (Season 3) in which she served as executive producer and director for numerous episodes.

In 2022, Wilkinson directed the BET+ Original film "Block Party" which is the first Juneteenth Family Comedy. The film is the first of its kind to have a theatrical, streaming, and linear release in the same month of its release.

== Filmography ==
=== Film ===
| Year | Title | Director | Writer | Producer |
|---|---|---|---|---|
| 1995 | Dandelions | Yes | Yes | Yes |
| 1998 | Instant Dread | Yes | Yes | Yes |
| 2000 | Girls Who Say Yes | Yes | No | No |
| 2005 | Devotion | Yes | Yes | Yes |
| 2010 | Unexpected | Yes | No | No |
| 2011 | Looking for Dawn | Yes | Yes | Yes |
| 2012 | Wilderness | Yes | No | No |
| 2020 | A Nashville Country Christmas | Yes | No | No |
| 2022 | Block Party | Yes | No | Executive |

=== Television ===
- How to Be Indie

* "How to Update Your Status"

- She's the Mayor

* "Gimme Shelter"

- Murdoch Mysteries

* "Lovers in a Murderous Time"
* "Unfinished Business"

- Switched at Birth

* "Left in Charge"

- Make It Pop

* "Submission Impossible"
* "Reality Bites"
* "The Curse of Reality"
* "Talent Show Redux"

- Heartland

* "Reckless Abandon"
* "Fearless"

- Single Ladies

* "Build"
* "Pain"

- Odd Squad

* "The Perfect Lunch"
* "The Jackies"

- Sunnyside

* "Chain Gang"
* "Clowns"

- Degrassi: The Next Generation

* "Power To The People"
* "Dig Me Out"
* "Better Man"
* "The World I Know"

- Republic of Doyle

* "Young Guns"

- Reign

* "A Better Man"

- Greenleaf

* "Call Not Complete"

- Kim's Convenience

* "Frank & Nayoung"
* "Hapkido"
* "Janet's New Job"
* "Handyman"
* "Cardboard Jug"
* "Silent Auction"

- Nashville

* episode #98: "Back in the Saddle Again"
* episode #119: "No Place That Far"

- Riverdale

* episode #10: "Chapter Ten: The Lost Weekend"
* episode #20: "Chapter Twenty: Tales from the Darkside"
* episode #39: "Chapter Thirty-Nine: The Midnight Club"

- Beyond

* episode #17: "Stir"

- Reverie

* episode #5: "Altumn Somnum"

- Dynasty

* episode #14: "The Gospel According To Blake Carrington"

- Take Two

* episode #8: "All About Ava"

- All American

* episode #7: "California Love"
* episode #20: "Protect Ya Neck"
* episode #39: "Roll the Dice"
* episode #43: "The Bigger Picture"
* episode #60: "Got Your Money"
* episode #82: "Time"
* episode #101: "Mass Appeal"
* episode #102: "The Next Episode"
* episode #103: "Draft Day"
* episode #114: "Squabble Up"
* episode #128: "All That I Got Is You"

- The Gifted

* episode #25: "hoMe"

- The Good Doctor

* episode #30: "Aftermath"

- Roswell, New Mexico

* episode #12: "Creep"

- Empire:

* episode #81: "A Wise Father That Knows His Own Child"
* episode #89: "Stronger Than My Rival"
* episode #96: "Talk Less"

- Why Women Kill

* episode #9: "I Was Just Wondering What Makes Dames Like You So Deadly"

- The Resident:

* episode #46: "Out for Blood"

- Locke & Key:

* episode #7: "Dissection"
* episode #8: "Ray of F**king Sunshine"

- How to Get Away with Murder:

* episode #88: "What If Sam Wasn't the Bad Guy This Whole Time?"

- All American: Homecoming:

* episode #8: "Just a Friend"

- Truth Be Told:

* episode #3: "If Wishes Were Horses"

- The Mysterious Benedict Society

* episode #5

- Step Up: High Water

* episode #3
* episode #4
* episode #5
* episode #8
* episode #10

- Power Book II: Ghost

* "Sacrifice"
* "Ghost in the Machine"

- Bel-Air

* "Don't Kill My Vibe"

- Orphan Black: Echoes

* "Peagusus Girl"
* "It's All Coming Back"

- Power Book III: Raising Kanan

* "Reckonings"

- 9-1-1: Lone Star

* "Fall From Grace"

- Brilliant Minds

* "The Colorblind Painter"

- The Irrational

* "The Exchange"

- 9-1-1

* "Lab Rats"
* "War"

- The Better Sister

* "Just Ask"
* "Steadying Hand"

- 9-1-1: Nashville

* "Spirit of the Games"

- Off Campus
  - "The Faceoff"
  - "The Line Change"

== Awards and distinctions ==
- 55th NAACP Image Awards Outstanding Directing in a Drama Series: Power Book II: Ghost (2024)
- Nominated for Children's & Family Emmy Awards | Outstanding Directing for a Single Camera Program: The Mysterious Benedict Society (TV series) (2023)
- Telly Award (Silver) Directing for Television | Series: "Truth Be Told" | Episode: "If Wishes Were Horses" (2022)
- Telly Award (Bronze) Directing for Television | Series: "How to Get Away with Murder" | Episode: "What If Sam Wasn't the Bad Guy This Whole Time?" (2022)
- Communicator Award (Gold Award of Excellence) Directing for Television | Series: "Truth Be Told" | Episode: "If Wishes Were Horses" (2022)
- Communicator Award (Gold Award of Excellence) Directing for Television | Series: "How to Get Away with Murder" | Episode: "What If Sam Wasn't the Bad Guy This Whole Time?" (2022)
- Nominated for Best Directing DGC Award | Series: LOCKE & KEY | Episode: "Dissection" (2020)
- Women in Film and Television’s Directors Guild of Canada Emerging Television Director Award (2008)
- Best Screenplay Award from African American Women in Cinema Film Festival for Love Child (2004)
- Platinum Remi Award for Dramatic Original Independent Short for Wilderness (2012)
- The Tony Stoltz Completion Award for Devotion (2005)
- Star! Audience Award at the ReelWorld Film Festival in Toronto for Devotion (2005)
- Best Feature at the San Francisco Urban Kids Film Festival for Devotion (2005)
- Nominated for a Directors Guild of Canada Award Team Award for Best Television Series: Family for Degrassi: The Next Generation.
