= Nashville season 6 =

2018 season of American TV series

Nashville
- Season 6
- Season 6 promotional poster
- Starring: Hayden Panettiere; Clare Bowen; Chris Carmack; Charles Esten; Jonathan Jackson; Sam Palladio; Lennon Stella; Maisy Stella; Kaitlin Doubleday
- No. of episodes: 16

Release
- Original network: CMT
- Original release: January 4 – July 26, 2018

Season chronology
- ← Previous; Season 5

The sixth and final season of the American television musical drama series Nashville, created by Callie Khouri, premiered on January 4, 2018, on CMT. The season consisted of 16 episodes.

As with seasons three through five, the episodes are named after songs from a variety of country artists, including Taylor Swift ("Jump Then Fall"), Miranda Lambert ("New Strings"), George Jones ("Sometimes You Just Can't Win"), Tanya Tucker ("Two Sparrows in a Hurricane"), and Hank Williams ("Beyond the Sunset").

== Production ==
In April 2017, it was announced that the series had been renewed for a sixth season, with a 16-episode order. In an interview following the fifth season finale, Marshall Herskovitz confirmed that actor Jeffrey Nordling would return as Jessie Caine's ex-husband Brad and that the new season would see the introduction of two new characters. Filming began on September 27, 2017. Five new major recurring cast members were announced in November 2017. On November 17, 2017, it was confirmed that it would be the series's final season.

The sixth season premiere was available on Hulu in the evening of December 19, 2017, and removed 24 hours later. Episodes aired an hour and two hours later on the Paramount Network and TV Land, following the initial airing on CMT. TVLand discontinued reruns of the series after episode five, but returned for the second half of the season.

Season six, like season five, was aired in two parts with the final eight episodes airing in the summer. The final eight episodes returned on June 7 and the season wrapped on July 26, 2018.

The season wrap party was held on April 7, 2018. Filming wrapped on the finale three days later.

The series received $5.7 million in tax incentives from the state of Tennessee, the lowest of all seasons.

== Cast ==
=== Main ===
- Hayden Panettiere as Juliette Barnes (Note: These actors appear in a fourth wall breaking scene at the end of the series as themselves.)
- Clare Bowen as Scarlett O'Connor
- Chris Carmack as Will Lexington
- Charles Esten as Deacon Claybourne
- Jonathan Jackson as Avery Barkley
- Sam Palladio as Gunnar Scott
- Lennon Stella as Maddie Conrad
- Maisy Stella as Daphne Conrad
- Kaitlin Doubleday as Jessie Caine
- Jeff Nordling as Brad Maitland

=== Recurring ===
- Ed Amatrudo as Glenn Goodman
- Kourtney Hansen as Emily
- Andi Rayne and Nora Gill as Cadence Barkley
- Melvin Kearney as Bo
- David Alford as Bucky Dawes
- Josh Stamberg as Darius Enright
- Jake Etheridge as Sean McPherson
- Rainee Blake as Alannah Curtis
- Nic Luken as Jonah Ford
- Dylan Arnold as Twig Wysecki
- Ilse DeLange as Ilse de Witt
- Mia Maestro as Rosa
- Miguel A. Núñez Jr. as Tommy Reddick
- Ronny Cox as Gideon Claybourne
- Cameron Scoggins as Zach Welles

=== Guest ===
- Rhiannon Giddens as Hallie Jordan
- Connie Britton as Rayna Jaymes
- Sylvia Jeffries as Jolene Barnes
- Eric Close as Teddy Conrad
- Will Chase as Luke Wheeler
- Judith Hoag as Tandy Hampton
- Kyle Dean Massey as Kevin Bicks
- Dana Wheeler-Nicholson as Beverly O'Connor
- Mark Collie as Frankie Gray
- Alicia Witt as Autumn Chase
- Joseph David-Jones as himself
- Callie Khouri as herself
- Marshall Herskovitz as himself
- Edward Zwick as himself
- Nick Jandl as himself
- Keean Johnson as himself
- Derek Krantz as himself
- Elaina Smith as herself
- Pam Tillis as herself
- Nancy O'Dell as herself
- Steve Earle as himself

== Episodes ==
No. overall	No. in season	Title	Directed by	Written by	Original release date	US viewers (millions)
Part 1
109	1	"New Strings"	Timothy Busfield	Scott Saccoccio	December 19, 2017 (online); January 4, 2018 (CMT)	0.87
Maddie has been invited to play a concert on New Year's Eve and a singer named Jonah Ford is also on the guest list. Juliette has been planning her new album launch which will kick off with a performance at the Bridgestone Arena. She has been given a second chance at Highway 65 but audience members start holding up signs and booing her. She tells them off and explains that if they knew the real her they would not like her before walking off stage. During a trip away with Avery, she runs into Darius, who says he is someone on her journey. Juliette is awake at 2AM, and finds a commercial of Darius talking about giving up addictions, and allowing access to your kingdom. Glenn tells Juliette that Darius tried to contact her at 2AM. She accuses Darius of stalking her, he refutes that it was fate; he recognizes the pain in her and wants to help her change her life. Scarlett tells Maddie she misses who she was. Zach encourages Deacon to date. Juliette meets Darius who says he does not run a cult, but a way to help the mind. On New Year's Eve, Gunnar tries to perform but freezes and gets help from Will. Juliette goes on radio, and announces she struggles with depression, and is cancelling her tour/album. Juliette calls Darius and tells him "I'm ready". Songs: "Is There Anybody Out There" (sung by Juliette); "Don't Come Easy" (sung by Will); "What It's Made For" (sung by Maddie); "Never Come Back Again" (sung by Gunnar)
110	2	"Second Chances"	Mike Binder	Jesse Zwick	January 11, 2018	0.78
Scarlett tells Deacon to ask Jessie out and he does. Maddie is upset Jonah has not texted her back right away. Will wants to sing with Gunnar again. Juliette tells Avery she is getting help from Darius. She then goes to build a house with Darius' coherent philosophy and is told to give the community 30% of her salary. Scarlett says she does not miss Gunnar, but does not want to sing anymore. Juliette spends the night with Darius' people. Daphne talks to Jake about their parents dating. Will and Gunnar take Avery to a venue and make them perform with him; they all have fun and want it to be a regular gig. Deacon and Jessie's date does not go well, but they end up kissing. Darius tells Juliette she has to leave her family and her career because she cannot be truly happy. Scarlett says she wants to help people away from music. Juliette comes home and looks blankly at Avery. Songs: "Ain't No Normal" (sung by Scarlett); "Right Where You Want Me" (sung by Will and Gunnar); "Stop the World (And Let Me Off)" (sung by Will, Gunnar, and Avery)
111	3	"Jump Then Fall"	Allan Arkush	Savannah Dooley	January 18, 2018	0.73
Zach tells Deacon he's leaving to pursue a senate bid. Juliette forces Avery to meet Darius. Deacon and Jessie talk about their relationship status and how to tell their kids when Daphne runs into them. Maddie parties and sings with Jonah and his entourage. The paparazzi ambushes Maddie and Jonah and stirs up emotions. Darius makes Juliette feel bad about singing. Will has a problem performing when he tries to hookup with someone, which is later diagnosed as a result of him taking steroids. The doctor tells him to stop taking them, but he doesn't even when he gets caught by Gunnar. Avery tries to tell Juliette he doesn't think Darius is good for her, but she doesn't want to hear it. Scarlett talks to Jessie about her and Deacon's relationship. Daphne tells Maddie she hates Jessie and Deacon dating because it means Rayna is really gone. Scarlett sees a commercial for equine therapy that helps troubled teens. Deacon and Jessie go on a date, while Daphne sings her feelings. Songs: "Come and Find Me" (sung by Daphne); "Different Kind of Hot" (sung by Jonah); "Will You Feel The Same" (sung by Maddie and Jonah); "I Always Will" (sung by Juliette)
112	4	"That's My Story"	Lily Mariye	Geoffrey Nauffts	January 25, 2018	0.80
Scarlett wants to be a part of equine therapy. Daphne has to dissect a frog with Jake. Bucky wants to manage the guys' band, and he gives them a slot at Winterfest. Juliette tells Avery she wants to change her life. Jake insults Deacon offending Daphne; she later tells Maddie which prompts Maddie to bring up her taking Deacon to court. Juliette goes to Darius' headquarters and hears people crying hysterically behind closed doors, Darius tells her it is the next stage called witnessing. He has her flashback to her childhood where she sees stacks of money, sees an old man, and Jolene. She eventually has to stop. Scarlett has trouble at the horse farm, where she meets Sean. Avery tells Deacon Juliette is acting like a friend he had who got involved in a cult and was changed forever. Juliette flashes back with Darius and the cult again, and it is revealed that Jolene was paid for men to rape Juliette. Deacon encourages Will, Gunnar, and Avery to stop fighting and play music. Jessie and Deacon bond. Darius tells Juliette she'll never be the same again once it is all over. Songs: "My Arms" (sung by Will, Avery, Gunnar); "Tearin' Up My Heart" (sung by Will, Avery, Gunnar); "Wandering Roads" (sung by Hallie and Deacon)
113	5	"Where the Night Goes"	Devon Gummersall	Liberty Godshall	February 1, 2018	0.72
Deacon and Jessie go on a date, and afterwards things get serious but they realize they need protection, so Deacon is later seen buying condoms. The guys realize they need a girl for the band and they eventually find Alannah. Juliette tells Avery her whole life would have been different if not for her rape, including her relationship. Jonah's ex makes a diss track about Maddie. Darius tells Juliette she is a narcissist who never needed her fame, Avery, or her kid, and that she needs to give back by attending an outreach program in Bolivia and that her daily life can't dilute her awakening. Gunnar wants to date Alannah. Avery doesn't want Juliette to go to Bolivia, but she won't change her mind. Maddie and Jonah fight and Maddie later talks with Deacon about him. Juliette tells Avery she doesn't need him to save her. Deacon and Jessie try to have sex but Deacon breaks down crying. He says the girls seem to be doing fine, so he thinks that means he should move on, but he can't. Juliette wakes up in the middle of the night, tells Avery he deserves someone normal and they kiss. Deacon tells Jessie not to give up on him and that he feels close to her. Avery wakes up the next day and Juliette is gone, Cadence is by herself, no Juliette. He looks around but she is gone, he calls her but it goes straight to voicemail - she has left for Bolivia without telling him. Songs: "Looking for the Light" (sung by Deacon); "Sweet Revenge" (sung by Alannah); "Go With It" (sung by Will, Avery, Gunnar); "Hold On (Not Leaving You Behind) (sung by Will, Avery, Gunnar, and Alannah)
114	6	"Beneath Still Waters"	Dan Lerner	Troy Putney	February 8, 2018	0.66
Daphne struggles to accept Deacon and Jessie's relationship; the new edition to the boys' band becomes a hit; Gunnar falls back into old habits; Scarlett takes an interest in a veteran undergoing equine therapy. Songs: "Raised On a Song" (sung by Scarlett); "The Only Way to Get There" (sung by Sean); "Love is Loud" (sung by Will, Avery, Gunnar, and Alannah); "River Swimming" (sung by Alannah)
115	7	"Can't Help But Wonder Where I'm Bound"	Allan Arkush	Tim Olshefski	February 15, 2018	0.71
Maddie is going to Miami with Jonah. Bucky tells the group that reporters want to talk to Alannah alone, but she denies them and says the reporters have to talk to the whole band. Maddie and Jonah make it to Miami with Twig. Deacon and Jessie go to an open house show and tell to watch Daphne and Jake perform. Avery and Cadence are at the airport to pick up Juliette, but she's not there. Avery can't find Juliette and when he calls the cult headquarters in Bolivia, they aren't any help. They just tell him Juliette is safe, they can't say anything else, and that she can call him whenever she'd like. Brad causes tension between Jessie, Deacon, and the kids. Gunnar tries to find out more about Alannah from her. The band and Alannah give an interview, but they only care about asking Alannah about her life and talking to her; Brad tries to poach her. Daphne sees a commercial for an American Idol-esque show, and she wants to join it, but Deacon says they have better plans for her when she's ready. The teens pull out some drugs, Maddie doesn't want any, but they force Twig to have some. Deacon tells Avery he should go get her. Deacon and Jessie have sex. Will is exercising and collapses. Avery finally sees Juliette. She says she chose not to call him, and that she's not herself anymore, but she's now more herself than she's ever been. She goes on to say she can't have anything to do with him or her old life until she fills the hole in her heart. Avery tries to take her home, but she yells and say she's not coming home. Avery gets on his knees begging her to come back with him, and she says she's already made her decision. Avery gets up, hurt, now realizing who Juliette is, and walks out. Songs: "Unravel" (sung by Daphne); "Smoking the Boys" (sung by Will, Avery, Gunnar, and Alannah) "Face the Sun" (sung by Deacon); "
116	8	"Sometimes You Just Can't Win"	Michael Lohmann	Scott Saccoccio	February 22, 2018	0.80
Daphne auditions for a singing competition. Scarlett invites Sean to see live music and he has a breakdown, but later calms down when singing by himself. Avery tells Deacon that he is done caring, and he no longer cares about his wife anymore. Brad tries to send Jake to boarding school, which causes stress between Jessie and Deacon. Brad tries to forcibly take him away, but Deacon pushes him against the wall, and Brad tells him he just assaulted him. The Lost Highways get invited to perform on The Chew, but halfway through the performance, Will collapses. As the EMTS work on him, Gunnar and Avery are horrified to hear Will has no pulse. Songs: "Face the Sun" (sung by Deacon); "Dear Fear" (sung by Daphne); "Hard Days" (sung by Will, Avery, Gunnar, and Alannah); "Take Myself Out" (sung by Jenny); "Bring Me An Angel" (sung by Sean)
Part 2
117	9	"Pick Yourself Up"	Jesse Zwick	Jesse Zwick	June 7, 2018	0.72
Will survives the overdose, but realizes his body isn't the same anymore. Zack comes back into town to check on Will. Deacon and Jessie face consequences from Brad after Deacon and Brad's altercation with Brad trying to take Jake away. Scarlett navigates a risky relationship with Sean, while Gunnar and Avery clash over Alannah. Songs: "Sorry Now" (sung by Alannah); "Hard Days" (sung by Alannah, Gunnar, and Avery); "The Giver" (sung by Avery); "My Turn" (sung by Will)
118	10	"Two Sparrows in a Hurricane"	Ellen S. Pressman	Michael Weintraub	June 14, 2018	0.76
Deacon and Jessie have to fight Brad on custody over Jake after Brad issued a restraining order against Deacon. Avery begins to date Alannah, which makes Gunnar mad and causes tensions between the band. This leads to Alannah leaving the band and signing with Brad. Scarlett takes Sean to the Bluebird to sing and he overcomes his PPD worries and makes it through a performance. Brad pressures Daphne in the singing competition with reminders of Rayna. Twig gains feelings for Maddie who is with Jonah. Daphne makes it to the next round of the competition. Songs: "Bring Me an Angel" (sung by Sean); "Love Goes On' (sung and written by Ilse DeLange); "Go" (sung by Alannah, Gunnar, Avery, and Will); "Memories Crash" (sung by Daphne)
119	11	"No Place That Far"	Dawn Wilkinson	Savannah Dooley	June 21, 2018	0.75
Gunnar and Avery clash over Avery kissing Alannah. Alannah signs with Brad's label and Jessie warns Alannah about Brad. Deacon and Jessie are over for good, while Twig confesses to Maddie that he loves her but she says she's with Jonah and they vow to remain friends. After Juliette witnesses the cult making people work too hard, she complains and tells Darius she has to leave. Darius is called away and Juliette is locked away in her room by two of his disciples and she is watched by Rosa. Juliette finds out she is pregnant, making her have to get back home and this revelation moves the initially hesitant Rosa to help her. Rosa tells Juliette the only thing you can do to the cult is to submit or they will lock you away and harm your family, and she shares they have kidnapped and hidden her son from her. Juliette promises to come back for Rosa. With Rosa's help, Juliette escapes the cult and catches a ride to the airport. Songs: "We Belong" (sung by Maddie); "Duermete Mi Nino [Bolivian Lullaby]" (sung by Juliette)
120	12	"The House That Built Me"	Timothy Busfield	Geoffrey Nauffts	June 28, 2018	0.67
Deacon encounters his father who hopes to make amends with him but Deacon later makes it clear he does not want anything to do with him, due to how Gideon treated the family when Deacon was a child. Maddie meets Gideon and tells him that she, Daphne and Scarlett are all that Deacon has left and after asking Deacon to hear his father out, Gideon is taken home to stay with him and the girls. Alannah is offered a support slot with The Lumineers but she feels that Brad is attempting to make a move on her and confronts him about it, which later results in her support slot being cancelled. Scarlett gets Sean a gig at The Bluebird with his wife in the audience. The latter leaves when she sees Sean and Scarlett performing together but when Scarlett meets her she agrees to talk to Sean. Sean visits his wife and son but freaks out when he sees a Facebook page dedicated to his fallen comrade. Locking himself in the bathroom with a gun, his wife calls Scarlett to calm him down. Avery tries to get Alannah over her disappointment by helping her write songs but as they are about to have sex, Juliette walks in, having returned home from Bolivia. Songs: "Like New" (sung by Deacon); "With You I'm Home" (sung by Sean); "If You're Going Down" (sung by Alannah); "Love Can Hold It All" (sung by Maddie & Daphne) Note: At the end of the episode, there is a message urging people who may be suicidal to seek help with the number listed to the National Suicide Prevention helpline.
121	13	"Strong Enough to Bend"	Dan Lerner	Troy Putney	July 5, 2018	0.70
Daphne has a hard time getting to grips with Brad and Ilse's requests to perform without her guitar and fails to show up at rehearsals. Following Ilse talking to Deacon, Daphne goes on the show and successfully performs without her guitar. Deacon finds living with his father hard going and attends another AA meeting where he reveals that he is unable to accept the change in his life but later makes peace with his father. She also has a hard time dealing with Brad, who does not like the songs she submitted. Deacon bumps into Jessie at the supermarket and they talk about where they are in their lives. Sean's wife asks Scarlett to try and get some help for him but while taking him to a Veterans' Affairs clinic Sean runs off and begins to question Scarlett's motives. However, he later calls to her house to apologize and says he knows that she is only trying to help. Juliette tells Hallie that she has lost Avery for good this time and after she spends time with Cadence, Avery decides it is best for him to move out. Alannah tells him that she does not want to be the cause of a family breaking up like her own family did. Songs: "Let Love In" (sung by Hallie); "Fall to Fly" (sung by Jenny Leigh); "Without Warning" (sung by Daphne)
122	14	"For the Sake of the Song"	Michael Lohmann	Scott Saccoccio	July 12, 2018	0.62
Deacon and the girls grow concerned when they notice that Gideon has been leaving the house without telling them. Noticing how secretive he is when he returns home, Deacon decides to follow him when he goes out and discovers him playing music with his friends. Following an argument in relation to how his father treated him as a child, Deacon refuses to invite him to the Bluebird to see him perform until Scarlett returns with Gideon and Deacon performs the first song he learned to play on guitar. Avery decides to move in with Gunnar and Will while Alannah decides to trap Brad after seeing him flirting with his receptionist and following a talk with Jessie. Juliette goes to war with Darius. At a pyjamas party at Jonah's mansion, his ex-girlfriend Mia shows up and they make out with each other while Twig is left to cover for him. However, Maddie discovers Jonah's indiscretion and is left devastated. While Daphne is leaving Gideon's laundry into his room, she discovers an empty bottle of whisky under his bed. Songs: "I'll Waltz You Home" (sung by Gideon); "Treading Water" (sung by Alannah); "Itty Bitty Ditty" (sung by Deacon)
123	15	"I Don't Want to Lose You Yet"	Allan Arkush	Liberty Godshall	July 19, 2018	0.71
Daphne acts coolly around Gideon following her discovery of the bottle of whisky under his bed. He later asks her to keep it a secret from Deacon. Scarlett and Sean arrange a benefit concert for the ranch. Following encouragement from Will and a talk with singer Steve Earle after he performs at the Bluebird, Gunnar regains his confidence to take to the stage and performs at the benefit concert. Scarlett and Sean also perform and afterwards he tries to kiss her but she tells him he needs to be with his wife and son. Deacon discovers a bottle of whisky in his father's car and tells his father that he never wants to see him again. Alannah dines with Brad who makes further advances towards her and she later breaks up with Avery. Cadence runs a temperature and he and Juliette bring her to the hospital. Juliette decides to pursue legal action against Darius and announces that she is retiring from the music industry. Maddie refuses to forgive Twig for keeping Jonah's secret but Twig fights with Jonah and later refuses to go to Europe with him. Twig then tells Maddie and they become a couple. Songs: "Falling Hard" (sung by Alannah); "When You Came Along" (sung by Sean and Scarlett); "Going Electric" (sung by Gunnar)
124	16	"Beyond the Sunset"	Callie Khouri	Jesse Zwick	July 26, 2018	0.88
Deacon is offered to go on a headlining tour, but is hesitant to accept. Maddie is having trouble connecting with Twig, so she breaks up with him, while Daphne worries about winning the competition. Deacon still cannot forgive his father, even after Gideon tells him he'll never hurt anyone again. Hallie tells Avery that Juliette is pregnant and Avery confronts her about it, to which Juliette replies that she wants him to love her, to tell her he wants her, and not be influenced by the baby. Alannah sets up Brad and records him threatening her and she, along with the other women Brad hurt, and Zach with Deacon take down Brad and buy his label. Daphne ends up losing the competition. A few months later, Maddie moves in a place of her own, Daphne signs with Highway 65, Will and Zach get back together, Avery, Gunnar, and Will's band is a success, and Alannah is performing by herself. One day, Juliette is at her new house, visibly pregnant, when Avery comes to her and tells her he wants her and wants to spend the rest of his life with her. The two kiss and join Cadence. Deacon is on tour, while Scarlett is engaged. Before a show, Deacon flashes back to his wedding night with Rayna, where she tells him that despite all they have been through, the two are meant for each other forever and that they're in each other's bloodstreams and will always be there to choose each other forever. Deacon performs and makes up with his dad. As he performs "A Life That's Good", the girls and Scarlett join him. As they sing, Gunnar and Will walk out, and then Juliette and Avery with both twins who play Cadence and they all sing the song. Then every previous cast member from the show joins them on stage, such as Jolene, Beverly, Rayna, Teddy, Luke, and more, revealing it is unscripted and breaking the fourth wall as creator Khouri thanks everyone for a wonderful six years and hopes they all have a life that's good. Songs: "Free" (sung by Juliette); "Little Fire" (sung by Maddie); “Dwell in my Soul” (sung by Alannah); “Carolina Rain” (sung by Hallie); “All That Matters” (sung by Jenny); “Heart” (sung by Daphne); "A Life That's Good" (sung by Rayna, Juliette, Deacon, Avery, Scarlett, Maddie, Daphne, Gunnar, and Will)

== Ratings ==
=== Nielsen ===
Viewership and ratings per episode of Nashville season 6
No.	Title	Air date	Rating (18–49)	Viewers (millions)	DVR (18–49)	DVR viewers (millions)	Total (18–49)	Total viewers (millions)
1	"New Strings"	January 4, 2018	0.2	0.87	—N/a	—N/a	—N/a	—N/a
2	"Second Chances"	January 11, 2018	0.1	0.78	0.4	1.09	0.5	1.87
3	"Jump Then Fall"	January 18, 2018	0.1	0.73	0.3	0.89	0.4	1.62
4	"That's My Story"	January 25, 2018	0.2	0.80	0.2	1.03	0.4	1.84
5	"Where the Night Goes"	February 1, 2018	0.1	0.72	0.3	1.01	0.4	1.73
6	"Beneath Still Waters"	February 8, 2018	0.1	0.66	0.3	0.99	0.4	1.65
7	"Can't Help But Wonder Where I'm Bound"	February 15, 2018	0.1	0.71	—N/a	—N/a	—N/a	—N/a
8	"Sometimes You Just Can't Win"	February 22, 2018	0.2	0.80	—N/a	—N/a	—N/a	—N/a
9	"Pick Yourself Up"	June 7, 2018	0.2	0.72	0.2	0.95	0.4	1.67
10	"Two Sparrows in a Hurricane"	June 14, 2018	0.2	0.76	—N/a	—N/a	—N/a	—N/a
11	"No Place That Far"	June 21, 2018	0.2	0.75	0.2	0.92	0.4	1.67
12	"The House That Built Me"	June 28, 2018	0.1	0.67	—N/a	—N/a	—N/a	—N/a
13	"Strong Enough to Bend"	July 5, 2018	0.1	0.70	—N/a	—N/a	—N/a	—N/a
14	"For the Sake of the Song"	July 12, 2018	0.1	0.62	0.2	0.99	0.3	1.61
15	"I Don't Want to Lose You Yet"	July 19, 2018	0.2	0.71	0.2	0.89	0.4	1.60
16	"Beyond the Sunset"	July 26, 2018	0.2	0.88	0.2	0.96	0.4	1.84

=== TVLand ===
Viewership and ratings per episode of Nashville season 6
No.	Title	Air date	Rating (18–49)	Viewers (millions)
1	"New Strings"	January 4, 2018	0.1	0.36
2	"Second Chances"	January 11, 2018	0.1	0.37
3	"Jump Then Fall"	January 18, 2018	—N/a	—N/a
4	"That's My Story"	January 25, 2018	0.1	0.35
5	"Where the Night Goes"	February 1, 2018	0.1	0.31
