= Allan Arkush =

American film and television director

- Born: April 30, 1948 (age 78); Jersey City, New Jersey, U.S.
- Occupations: Film director; television director; television producer
- Years active: 1970–present
- Spouse: Joanne Palace Arkush
- Children: 2

Allan Arkush (born April 30, 1948) is an American director and producer of films, television and videos. He is a regular collaborator with Joe Dante.

== Early life ==
Arkush grew up in Fort Lee, New Jersey. He graduated in 1966 from Fort Lee High School. His experiences there served as the inspiration for the film Rock 'n' Roll High School (1979). He attended New York University Film School from 1967 to 1970. Septuagenarian Substitute Ball, his senior film, starring John Ford Noonan, won third prize at the National Student Film Festival-1970. His teacher and faculty adviser was Martin Scorsese, "whose knowledge and passion changed my life". While at NYU, he worked at The Fillmore East as an usher, stage crew member and in the psychedelic light show "Joe's Lights", performing with artists including The Who, Grateful Dead, Santana, Allman Bros, Miles Davis, Indianapolis Symphony Orchestra, Virgil Fox and Fleetwood Mac in New York City and London.

In 1973, he returned to New York City, where he drove a taxi. He moved to Los Angeles on October 4, 1973.

== Career ==
Arkush got his start in the film industry working (with the assistance of Jon Davison and Jonathan Kaplan) in the trailer department for Roger Corman's New World Pictures, where he met Dante. They cut trailers and TV spots for Death Race 2000, Crazy Mama, Amarcord, TNT Jackson, Small Change, Eat My Dust and at least 100 others. He co-directed Corman-produced films Hollywood Boulevard, Deathsport, was second-unit director on Grand Theft Auto for Ron Howard, and directed Rock 'n' Roll High School, starring The Ramones. He later directed the comedy Get Crazy.

He directed several TV series, including Fame and St. Elsewhere. He directed 12 episodes of Moonlighting and received an Emmy nomination for "I Am Curious ... Maddie," the series's highest-rated episode. He directed 15 TV pilots and sold 10. The most successful was Crossing Jordan (director and executive producer), which lasted 117 episodes. His TV work includes The Temptations, for which he received nominations for an Emmy Award and DGA, Ally McBeal (the "Cro-Magnon," "dancing baby" episode, which landed another Emmy nomination), Shake, Rattle and Rock! and Elvis Meets Nixon.

Arkush also directed Young at Heart. He was the director and executive producer of the TV series Heroes for eleven episodes, including "The Second Coming", which won the Emmy for best special effects. In 2015, he directed an episode of the second season of Salem. Other highlights include Nashville and Hellcats, which Arkush directed and acted as the executive producer for the pilot series. His most recent work is A Series of Unfortunate Events for which he received a DGA nomination and Another Life, both for Netflix.

== Personal life ==
Arkush contributes commentary to the web series Trailers from Hell where he has contributed over 100 film culture critical shorts, and has a Video Column- "The Last Reel". He is a member of the DGA Mentor Program, and has been teaching the "Narrative Workshop & Analysis" 1st year Class at the American Film Institute since 2019.

He is married to Joanne Palace Arkush, and they have two daughters; Allison and Jacqueline.

== Filmography ==
=== Films ===
- Hollywood Boulevard (1976) (co-directed with Joe Dante)
- Deathsport (1978) (co-directed with Nicholas Niciphor)
- Rock 'n' Roll High School (1979)
- Heartbeeps (1981)
- Get Crazy (1983)
- Caddyshack II (1988)
- Shake, Rattle and Rock! (1994) (TV film)
- Young at Heart (1995) (TV film)
- Desert Breeze (1996) (TV film)
- Elvis Meets Nixon (1997) (TV film)
- The Temptations (1998) (miniseries)
- Prince Charming (2001) (TV film)
- Christmas with Holly (2012) (TV film)

=== Television series ===
- Summer (1984) (unsold pilot)
- Fame (1984–1986)
  - "The Monster That Devoured Las Vegas" (S4 E7)
  - "The Ballad of Roy Claxton" (S4 E9)
  - "The Rivalry" (S4 E11)
  - "Leroy and the Kid" (S5 E2)
  - "Bronco Bob Rides Again" (S5 E3)
  - "White Light" (S5 E5)
  - "Holmes Sweet Holmes" (S5 E14)
  - "Self Defense" (S5 E19)
  - "Contacts" (S5 E21)
- The Twilight Zone (1986)
  - "The Misfortune Cookie" (S1 E14c)
- St. Elsewhere (1986–1987)
  - "Family Ties" (S4 E14)
  - "Come Home, Oh Sapien" (S4 E20)
  - "Not My Type" (S5 E6)
  - "Nothing Up My Sleeve" (S5 E8)
  - "Getting Ahead" (S5 E15)
  - "Schwarzwald" (S5 E17)
- Moonlighting (1986–1989)
  - "Funeral for a Door Nail" (S2 E17)
  - "The Son Also Rises" (S3 E1)
  - "Maddie's Turn to Cry" (S3 E13)
  - "I Am Curious... Maddie" (S3 E14)
  - "A Trip to the Moon" (S4 E1)
  - "Come Back Little Shiska" (S4 E2)
  - "Tale in Two Cities" (S4 E4)
  - "Cool Hand Dave (Part 1)" (S4 E5)
  - "Cool Hand Dave (Part 2)" (S4 E6)
  - "Father Knows Less" (S4 E7)
  - "Fetal Attraction" (S4 E9)
  - "Plastic Fantastic Lovers" (S5 E4)
- L.A. Law (1986)
  - "El Sid" (S1 E12)
- The Bronx Zoo (1987)
  - "Signs of Life" (S1 E1)
  - "Small Victories" (S1 E3)
  - "Runaway Hearts" (S1 E6)
- Tattingers (1988)
  - "Virgin Spring" (S1 E4)
  - "Death and Taxis" (S1 E6)
- Capital News (1990)
  - "Pilot" (S1 E1)
- Shannon's Deal (1990–1991)
  - "Words to Music" (S1 E1)
  - "Inside Straight" (S1 E2)
  - "Greed" (S2 E2)
  - "First Amendment" (S2 E5)
- Parenthood (1990–1991)
  - "Pilot" (S1 E1)
  - "My Dad Can Beat Up Your BMW" (S1 E2)
  - "Love Stinks" (S1 E5)
  - "Hollow Halloween" (S1 E7)
  - "Take My Parents, Please" (S1 E9)
  - "Fun for Kids" (S1 E12)
- Mann & Machine (1992)
  - "Water, Water, Everywhere" (S1 E4)
- Middle Ages (1992)
  - "The Pig in the Python" (S1 E1)
- I'll Fly Away (1992–1993)
  - "Desperate Measures" (S2 E5)
  - "Realpolitik" (S2 E12)
- Sirens (1993)
  - "They Do It Standing Up" (S1 E2)
- Johnny Bago (1993)
  - "Hail the Conquering Marrow" (S1 E2)
- Moon Over Miami (1993)
  - "Pilot" (S1 E1)
  - "A Missing Person" (S1 E2)
  - "My Old Flame" (S1 E3)
  - "If You Only Knew" (S1 E7)
  - "In a Safe Place" (S1 E10)
  - "Small Packages" (S1 E12)
- Central Park West (1995–1996)
  - "Stephanie and the Wolves" (S1 E1)
  - "Chess Moves" (S1 E2)
  - "Intrigues" (S1 E5)
  - "With the Weapons of a Mrs." (S1 E8)
  - "Behind Your Back" (S1 E11)
  - "She Danced Only One Summer" (S1 E12)
  - "Guess Who's Come to Annoy You?" (S2 E2) (co-directed with Don Scardino)
- Dangerous Minds (1996)
- Timecop (1997)
- Total Security (1997)
- The Visitor (1997)
- Players (1997)
- Ally McBeal (1998–1999)
  - "Cro-Magnon" (S1 E12)
  - "Love's Illusions" (S2 E22)
- Dawson's Creek (1998)
- The Practice (1999)
- Snoops (1999–2000)
- Bull (2000)
- Tucker (2000)
- Go Fish (2001)
- Crossing Jordan (2001–2007)
  - "Pilot" (S1 E1)
  - "The Dawn of a New Day" (S1 E2)
  - "Born to Run" (S1 E4)
  - "Digger: Part 2" (S1 E9)
  - "Miracles & Wonders" (S1 E13)
  - "Crimes and Punishment" (S1 E17)
  - "Secrets & Lies: Part 2" (S1 E23)
  - "There's No Place Like Hone" (S2 E1)
  - "One Twelve (Upon the Wasted Building)" (S2 E6)
  - "Ockham's Razor" (S2 E10)
  - "Sunset Division" (S2 E20)
  - "Pandora's Trunk: Part 2" (S2 E22)
  - "Devil May Care" (S3 E1)
  - "Second Chances" (S3 E6)
  - "All the News Fit to Print" (S3 E9)
  - "Revealed" (S3 E10)
  - "Oh, Brother Where Art Thou?: Part 3" (S3 E13)
  - "Intruder" (S4 E3)
  - "Blue Moon" (S4 E6)
  - "Fire from the Sky" (S4 E8)
  - "You Really Got Me" (S4 E13)
  - "Embraceable You" (S4 E19)
  - "Jump Push Fall" (S4 E21)
  - "Luck Be a Lady" (S5 E2)
  - "Judgement Day" (S5 E4)
  - "Loves Me Not" (S5 E10)
  - "Death Toll" (S5 E14)
  - "Save Me" (S5 E17)
  - "Don't Leave Me This Way" (S5 E31)
  - "Night of the Living Dead" (S6 E6)
- Heroes (2006–2010)
  - "Don't Look Back" (S1 E2)
  - "Six Months Ago" (S1 E10)
  - "Company Man" (S1 E17)
  - "How to Stop an Exploding Man" (S1 E23)
  - "Lizards" (S2 E2)
  - "Powerless" (S2 E11)
  - "The Second Coming" (S3 E1)
  - "Villains" (S3 E8)
  - "Trust and Blood" (S3 E15)
  - "I Am Sylar" (S3 E24)
  - "The Wall" (S4 E17)
- Melrose Place (2009)
  - "Grand" (S1 E3)
- Mercy (2009)
  - "You Lost Me With The Cinder Block" (S1 E5)
- White Collar (2009)
  - "The Portrait" (S1 E5)
- Life Unexpected (2010)
  - "Turtle Undefeated" (S1 E5)
- Hellcats (2010)
  - "A World Full of Strangers" (S1 E1)
  - "I Say a Little Prayer" (S1 E2)
  - "Back of a Car" (S1 E8)
- Ringer (2011–2012)
- Franklin & Bash (2012)
- The Client List (2012–2013)
- Witches of East End (2013–2014)
  - "Today I Am a Witch" (S1 E3)
  - "A Moveable Beast" (S2 E1)
  - "For Whom the Spell Tolls" (S2 E13)
- Switched at Birth (2014–2017)
  - "Fountain" (S3 E3)
  - "The Ambush" (S3 E10)
  - "We Were So Close That Nothing Used to Stand Between Us" (S4 E4)
  - "The Call" (S5 E1)
- Defiance (2014–2015)
  - "This Woman's Work" (S2 E6)
  - "If You Could See Her Through My Eyes" (S2 E7)
  - "Ostinato in White" (S3 E9)
  - "When Twilight Dims the Sky Above" (S3 E10)
- Dig (2015)
  - "The Well of Souls" (S1 E6)
- Salem (2015)
  - "Blood Kiss" (S2 E2)
- Minority Report (2015)
  - "Hawk-Eye" (S1 E3)
- Heroes Reborn (2015)
  - "June 13th Part One" (S1 E7)
  - "June 13th Part Two" (S1 E8)
- CSI: Cyber (2015)
  - "Gone in 6 Seconds" (S2 E6)
- BrainDead (2016)
  - "Wake Up Grassroots: The Nine Virtues of Participatory Democracy, and How We Can Keep America Great by Encouraging an Informed Electorate" (S1 E4)
  - "Back to Work: A Behind-the-Scenes Look at Congress and How It Gets Things Done (and Often Doesn't)" (S1 E5)
- NCIS (2016)
  - "Philly" (S14 E5)
- No Tomorrow (2016)
  - "No Debts Remain Unpaid" (S1 E6)
- The Good Fight (2017)
  - "First Week" (S1 E2)
- Nashville (2017–2018)
  - "Not Ready to Make Nice" (S5 E16)
  - "Jump Then Fall" (S6 E3)
  - "Can't Help But Wonder Where I'm Bound" (S6 E7)
  - "I Don't Want to Lose You Yet" (S6 E15)
- A Series of Unfortunate Events (2018)
  - "The Hostile Hospital: Part 1" (S2 E7)
  - "The Hostile Hospital: Part 2" (S2 E8)
- Another Life (2019)
  - "Living the Dream" (S1 E7)
  - "Hello" (S1 E10)
