= Nashville season 5 =

2016–2017 season of American TV series

Nashville
- Season 5
- Season 5A and 5B promotional posters
- Starring: Connie Britton; Hayden Panettiere; Clare Bowen; Chris Carmack; Charles Esten; Jonathan Jackson; Sam Palladio; Lennon Stella; Maisy Stella
- No. of episodes: 22

Release
- Original network: CMT
- Original release: December 15, 2016 – August 10, 2017

Season chronology
- ← Previous; Season 4 Next → Season 6

The fifth season of the American television musical drama series Nashville, created by Callie Khouri, it premiered on December 15, 2016, on CMT, the first on the network. The show features an ensemble cast with Connie Britton and Hayden Panettiere in the leading roles as two country music superstars, Rayna Jaymes and Juliette Barnes. The season consisted of 22 episodes that were aired in two parts of eleven episodes each, with Britton appearing in the first part only.

As with seasons three and four, the episodes are named after songs from a variety of country artists, including Sara Evans ("A Little Bit Stronger"), Garth Brooks ("If Tomorrow Never Comes"), Carrie Underwood ("The Night Before (Life Goes On)"), Sheryl Crow ("A Change Would Do You Good"), and Dixie Chicks ("Not Ready to Make Nice").

== Production ==
On May 12, 2016, ABC cancelled the series after four seasons. On June 10, 2016, it was announced that CMT had picked up the series for a fifth season of 22 episodes. The pick-up was assisted by $11 million in economic incentives: $8.5 million comes via the State of Tennessee Film Office, $1 million from the City of Nashville, $1 million from the Nashville Convention & Visitor Corp and $500,000 from Ryman Hospitality. The cast had the first table read on September 1, 2016. Filming began on September 7, 2016. Lily Mariye directed the fourth episode, which began filming on October 10, 2016. Production was well underway by November 2016, with filming on the sixth episode beginning on Friday, November 4. On March 16, 2017, the cast celebrated completing filming on the 100th episode. Filming on the seventeenth episode was taking place on April 26, 2017. Sam Palladio filmed his final scenes for the season on Tuesday, May 30, 2017. The season wrap party was held on June 4, 2017. Filming wrapped on June 8, 2017.

On December 1, 2016, it was announced that the first hour of the two-hour season premiere would premiere December 15, 2016. The sneak peek airing of the first episode aired simultaneously on CMT, MTV, and TV Land. The double episode season premiere totaled a 0.8 demo as it aired across two networks, CMT and Nick at Nite. New episodes first air on CMT, and then air again on Nick at Nite, the same day.

== Cast ==
The fifth season featured two main cast members see their exit. Will Chase and Aubrey Peeples were announced to not be returning to the series in June 2016, although Chase did make a guest appearance.

=== Main ===
- Connie Britton as Rayna Jaymes
- Hayden Panettiere as Juliette Barnes
- Clare Bowen as Scarlett O'Connor
- Chris Carmack as Will Lexington
- Charles Esten as Deacon Claybourne
- Jonathan Jackson as Avery Barkley
- Sam Palladio as Gunnar Scott
- Lennon Stella as Maddie Conrad
- Maisy Stella as Daphne Conrad
- Cameron Scoggins as Zach Welles
- Kaitlin Doubleday as Jessie Caine

=== Recurring ===
- David Alford as Bucky Dawes
- Ed Amatrudo as Glenn Goodman
- Kourtney Hansen as Emily
- Melvin Kearney as Bo
- Andi Rayne and Nora Gill as Cadence Barkley
- Rachel Bilson as Alyssa Greene (season 5B)
- Joseph David-Jones as Clayton Carter
- Rhiannon Giddens as Hallie Jordan
- Christian Coulson as Damien George
- Linds Edwards as Carl Hockney
- Odessa Adlon as Liv
- Ben Taylor as Flynn Burnett
- Jordan Woods-Robinson as Randall St. Claire
- Moses Black as Pastor Lewis
- Jen Richards as Allyson Del Lago
- Murray Bartlett as Jakob Fine
- Joanie Stewart as Sheila Goldfarb
- Bridgit Mendler as Ashley Willerman
- Jeff Nordling as Brad Maitland
- Myles Moore as Jake Maitland
- Katrina Norman as Polly

=== Guest ===
- Megan Barry as herself
- Will Chase as Luke Wheeler
- Sylvia Jeffries as Jolene Barnes
- Kyle Dean Massey as Kevin Bicks
- Carolina Chocolate Drops as Nashville Chocolate Drops
- Kathie Lee Gifford as herself
- Hoda Kotb as herself
- Carla Gugino as Virginia Wyatt
- Judith Hoag as Tandy Hampton
- Eric Close as Teddy Conrad
- Pam Tillis as herself
- JD Souther as Watty White
- Ruby Amanfu as herself
- Blair Gardner as himself
- Matthew Bellows as Mike Dolan
- Trevor Noah as himself
- Harry Connick Jr. as himself
- Michael Ray as himself
- Jaden Smith as himself
- Cassadee Pope as herself
- RaeLynn as herself
- Lauren Alaina as herself
- Kacey Musgraves as herself
- Danielle Bradbery as herself

== Episodes ==
No. overall	No. in season	Title	Directed by	Written by	Original release date	US viewers (millions)
Part 1
87	1	"The Wayfaring Stranger"	Callie Khouri	Story by : Edward Zwick and Marshall Herskovitz; Teleplay by : Marshall Herskovitz	December 15, 2016	2.89
Juliette's plane crashed in a field right outside of Nashville and she is the only survivor. A nearby citizen who witnessed the crash stays with her until help arrives. Avery is informed and goes to see her. Three weeks after the crash, Juliette is in rehab recovering, since two of her vertebrae were shattered, she has a broken leg and is paralyzed. While talking to Rayna, she says that she caused what happened to her because she has messed up everything in her life. Highway 65 has hit some bumps in the road financially, which concerns Rayna. She agrees to play at a private event in Silicon Valley hosted by an app developer named Zach Wells (who is a fanboy of hers) as a way to bring in money. She has an anxiety attack during her flight because of what happened to Juliette, and she is feeling anxiousness about flying home. Later that night, Deacon flies out to California, so he can be with her on the plane back to Nashville. She declines and would rather drive back alone, so she can think. Maddie is having a hard time coming up with a chorus for a song she wrote. Daphne wants to help, but Maddie harshly turns her down. After a talk with Scarlett, Maddie accepts Daphne's input. Avery confesses his love to Juliette, but she responds, "We'll see how you feel in a few weeks." On the way back from visiting the crash site, she comes across a church where she finds the "angel" who was with her the night of the crash. Songs: "God Shall Wipe All Tears Away" (sung by Hallie); "You're Best" (sung by Maddie and Daphne); "Already Gone" (sung by Rayna); "The Wayfaring Stranger" (sung by Blind Man and Rayna)
88	2	"Back in Baby's Arms"	Stephen Cragg	Callie Khouri	January 5, 2017	1.20
Rayna wants her next album to be about her and Deacon's story but Deacon and Bucky aren't so sure. Autumn Chase texts Gunnar and wants him to open up for her again which doesn't sit well with Scarlett. At a meeting with the label Rayna tells them what their new single is which leads to Scarlett getting in a tizzy when she can't figure out who Gunnar wrote the song about. She worries about their past instead of enjoying what they have now. While out celebrating his birthday Will meets Jakob Fine, a menswear designer. He invites Will to a trunk show. Kevin encourages Will to go to the party where Jakob hits on him. Before Jakob has the chance to kiss him, Will stops him and says that he is in a relationship. Juliette is frustrated that she is a "cripple" and also doesn't want the public to see her like this. Emily drives Juliette out to the church where she saw the woman who saved her. The pastor says that her name is Hallie but he doesn't give her any personal details since Hallie doesn't want any media attention. Juliette wants him to give her her thanks and cell number. He assures her that God has a plan for her. Zach Welles calls Rayna saying he is on his way to Nashville; he wants to "hack her cloud". Later on, as Rayna walks into work, someone watches her as they listen to her music. Songs: "All of Me" (sung by Scarlett and Gunnar); "Simple as That" (sung by Deacon); "Spinning Revolver" (sung by Will and Kevin)
89	3	"Let's Put it Back Together Again"	Mike Binder	Geoffrey Nauffts	January 12, 2017	1.11
Juliette listens to demos to motivate her recuperation from the plane crash. Avery decides to produce Ashley Willerman, a twenty-something YouTube sensation with millions of views and a promising career, but the talented girl is also a troublemaker. She spent the day being rude to everyone and Avery gives her what for. Rayna and Bucky go to make a music video to get The Exes careers back on track. Maddie begins an internship at a recording studio and meets Clayton Carter, a street musician, whom she is romantically interested in. Maddie then gets fired when she unleashes a poorly timed truth bomb to everyone during a fight with Ashley, which hurts Deacon. She realizes that Deacon was still hurting for the things she said during her emancipation hearing and she apologizes to him and Ashley, getting her job back. Randall St. Claire becomes Highway 65's new social media and digital marketing manager. Songs: "A Few Steps My Way" (sung by Clay); "Out for Love" (sung by Ashley); "On My Way" (sung by Juliette)
90	4	"Leap of Faith"	Lily Mariye	Savannah Dooley	January 19, 2017	0.96
Juliette continues to feel sensation in her legs and wants to try to speed up her recovery. She has not been taking her pain pills because she is afraid she will get hooked on them like the last time. Will and Kevin go house hunting. Rayna looks for a music video director for The Exes, but they don't have the budget for one. Zach wants to go into business with Rayna. She and Deacon aren't so sure of it, but she needs the money. In return he wants 20% of Highway 65. Rayna discovers a mysterious package with no stamp at her door that is filled with a letter and rose petals. Juliette goes back to the church and asks God why she is the only one who survived the crash. When Kevin finds the application for the condo he and Will were looking at in the trash, he asks Will if he wants to move in together. Will tells him no and they eventually break up. Songs: "Burn to Dark" (sung by Will)
91	5	"Love Hurts"	Ron Lagomarsino	Jesse Zwick	January 26, 2017	0.93
The Exes shoot the music video for their single, and Scarlett and the director butt heads. She is having a hard time shooting it because she doesn't act the way she does in the video in real life. Clayton and Maddie spend the night out on the town. Maddie tries to put the moves on him but he resists due to him being seven years older, and her being white. She says it's not a problem and doesn't get why it bothers him. Turns out he was just saying that to cover up the fact he is bi-polar. Rayna has received more mysterious letters since the first one, and she and Bucky are still trying to figure out who's behind them. The guy who wrote the letters to Rayna shows up at Highway 65, which freaks her out. Bucky escorts him out while she calls for security. Songs: "Before You" (sung by Clay); "In Love" (sung by Maddie); "This World Don't Owe Me Nothing" (sung by Clay)
92	6	"A Little Bit Stronger"	Stephen Cragg	Richard Kramer	February 2, 2017	0.75
Rayna has put a restraining order out on her stalker, and beefs up security at her house. Maddie thinks that her parents hate Clay because he's black, and their opinion about him would be different if he was white. They say no, they just don't like how he's seven years older than her, and it's not about race. Maddie admits to Clay that she is a little afraid of him. Luke has put Wheelin' Dealin' Records up for sale, and Zach wants Highway 65 to acquire it. They go to his show to give him an offer, he accepts. Juliette invites Hallie over for dinner where she then invites Juliette to her church. She also invites her to the East Nashville Community Center, where Juliette discovers that Hallie is in a music group, the Nashville Chocolate Drops. Being inspired after going to church, Juliette says that she wants to make a gospel album after Rayna asks if she wants to go back to Highway 65. She also continues to improve with her recovery, and is now able to use crutches. Scarlett sits in on the editing for The Exes music video. Rayna's stalker surprises Daphne at school. Songs: "Won't Back Down" (sung by Avery); "His Eye Is On the Sparrow" (sung by Hallie); "Sourwood Mountain" (sung by Hallie); "Can't Nobody Do Me Like Jesus" (sung by Hallie); "Wide Open" (sung by Luke)
93	7	"Hurricane"	Dan Lerner	Liberty Godshall	February 9, 2017	0.77
To help promote Rayna, Zach sends a camera man to film Rayna and Deacon going about their day. Rayna isn't too comfortable with this. Clay says that he doesn't want to fall for Maddie, but she tells him he already has. The Exes and Damien appear on Kathie Lee & Hoda to premiere their music video. While Rayna and Deacon are writing their story, Gene the cameraman is irritating them because he won't leave them alone. Deacon takes Rayna out of the house to take a break from Gene, and while they are away Maddie invites Clay over. Rayna gets a call saying there was a fire at the house. Maddie had baked a cake but forgot about it while she was upstairs with Clay. When they get home the firemen inform them that the fire was small and there was no damage. Rayna is not happy with Maddie that she had invited Clay over while being home alone with Daphne. Scarlett and Damien get past their differences with each other, and he steals a kiss from her. Songs: "My Favorite Hurricane" (sung by Deacon and Rayna)
94	8	"Stand Beside Me"	Mike Binder	Matthew Ross	February 16, 2017	0.83
Juilette tells Hallie about her plans for making a gospel album leaving Hallie confused. She questions why since that genre really isn't her thing but accepts it. Scarlett and Damien get closer, and she breaks up with Gunnar. Wayne Hockney, Rayna's stalker taunts the Jaymes/Claybourne household by going as far as he's allowed with his restraining order. This drives them crazy, turning their lives around, and Deacon wants to confront him. The police advise not to do that. They want him arrested but can't since he hasn't done anything he's not supposed to. When Juliette tells the choir at church her idea and says that she wants them to sing on the album with her as partners, there are mixed reactions. She gets in a pretty heated argument with one woman. The next day she goes back to church to apologize, give her reasons for making the album and they all agree to it. Rayna hears Clay sing and wants him to come down to Highway 65 to talk about his future. Wayne violates his restraining order by surprising her at work. He holes up in her office where they talk, and when she is able to get free he catches her and holds a knife up to her. After pleas from Rayna and the police he lets her go and is arrested. The police take her home, and as she is on the phone with Deacon to tell him what happened, a pickup truck crashes into them. Songs: "Close to the Fire" (sung by Clay); "Eye of the Storm" (sung by Avery)
95	9	"If Tomorrow Never Comes"	Callie Khouri	Geoffrey Nauffts	February 23, 2017	0.93
Rayna has a shattered pelvis and hip from the crash, and has to have four hours worth of surgery. Seeing her mom lying in the hospital bed, on meds, waiting for surgery, makes Maddie sick. Juliette being Juliette goes against orders from the desk nurse and sees Rayna. Daphne doesn't want to go to her concert at school because Rayna can't go now, and says that Rayna is the only one who cares about her. Juilette is having problems of her own, with her leg bothering her. Laying in her hospital bed, Rayna sees her dead mother, and is talking to her. This freaks Deacon out and worries him because he knows people experience stuff like this before they pass away. The doctor tells him not to worry. Daphne's choir comes to the hospital to support her, and they all sing for Rayna. During this, she crashes and is sent to the ICU. Her organs are failing, and her outcome isn't too promising. She can't hold on any longer, and dies with everyone at her side. Songs: "A Life That's Good" (sung by Maddie, Daphne, and Deacon); "East Iris" (sung by Daphne); "Make You Feel My Love" (sung by Daphne)
96	10	"I'll Fly Away"	Dan Lerner	Liberty Godshall	March 2, 2017	1.12
Rayna's memorial service takes place, and while at the reading of the will, it is revealed that Rayna never decided who gets custody of Maddie and Daphne in the event of her death. Maddie does not want to be taken away from Deacon, and Daphne does not want to be separated from her sister as well as not wanting to choose between Teddy and Deacon. Teddy learns he has three more months of his prison sentence to serve and together with Tandy is prepared to fight for custody of both Maddie and Daphne but Deacon tells him that he will hand over the rights of guardianship to them without a fuss. Teddy has a change of heart after seeing Deacon and the girls perform a moving tribute to Rayna at the CMT Awards when Juliette backs out of the performance and grants guardianship to Deacon until he is released from prison. Meanwhile, Zach and Will grow closer. Songs: "By Your Side" (sung by Will); "Sanctuary" (sung by Deacon, Maddie, Daphne)
97	11	"Fire and Rain"	Timothy Busfield	Jesse Zwick	March 9, 2017	0.97
Juliette helps Maddie navigate the wave of attention she receives after her performance at the CMT Music Awards; Zach demands the masters from Rayna and Deacon's unfinished album. Zach wants the album to be released soon, but Deacon doesn't see the hurry. Deacon watches home movies and reads Rayna's diary which causes him to finally break down. Juliette and Scarlet get into about Maddie. Everybody comes over to record some vocals on one of Rayna's song where she had already laid down her vocals. This encourages Deacon to record his part of his duet with Rayna. The Exes get an offer to open up for Margo Price, and Scarlet drops a bombshell on Gunnar, saying she is pregnant but doesn't know who the father is. Songs: "You're Mine" (sung by Rayna, Deacon, Scarlett, Gunnar, Avery, Will, Maddie, Daphne, and Juliette); "Can't Remember Never Loving You" (sung by Deacon and Rayna)"
Part 2
98	12	"Back in the Saddle Again"	Dawn Wilkinson	Savannah Dooley	June 1, 2017	0.78
Ten weeks later, Juliette is at the album release party for her gospel album, and every single review pans her album. Deacon is running Highway 65, Zach is the brains of the operation. Deacon gets a call from Daphne's school, saying she has been falling in grades. Scarlett is at a doctor's appointment, and is doing a paternity test. Deacon talks to Daphne about her failing history, and has to start helping her on her project. Juliette is upset about her album flopping. Will and Zach talk about their relationship. Scarlett is having morning sickness. Juliette tries to give Maddie advice about her music, but Maddie is not happy. Deacon and Daphne build a pop-sickle stick project. Daphne's project gets broken, and she skips school. Juliette talks to Avery about Maddie's bad song. Daphne meets a street girl named Liv, and goes on an adventure with Liv, and other homeless teens. Will is nervous about impressing Zach. Deacon talks with Zach about business models. When Daphne comes home Deacon tells her she can't act how she is, but she yells at him. Maddie yells at Juliette for trying to help her, and insults Juliette about her album flopping. Scarlett gets a phone call from her doctor and ignores it. Daphne goes to therapy where their therapist tells Deacon she has depression. Will performs. It is revealed that Damien is the father of Scarlett's baby. Gunnar talks his troubles away to Avery. Clay likes Juliette's version of the song better. Deacon and Daphne eat dinner together. Deacon, Daphne, and Maddie have a talk together. Maddie listens to the versions of her song. Zach wants to fire Bucky. Juliette apologizes to Maddie, and says she will back away professionally. Maddie uses Juliette's version of the song. Gunnar tells Scarlett he wants to try at a relationship. Deacon tries to get Daphne to be with the family, but she yells at him. Deacon and Maddie comfort Daphne. Songs: "Saved" (sung by Maddie); "You're Standing on My Neck" (sung by Daphne and Liv); "Stand Up" (sung by Will)
99	13	"'Til I Can Make It On My Own"	Michael Lohmann	Scott Saccoccio	June 8, 2017	0.69
Juliette is at the doctor to see why she feels weird whenever she is performing. Her doctor tells her it is her body reacting to childhood trauma. The doc advises her to cancel the show. Meanwhile, Avery has a show to do. Juliette tells Glenn she wants to do her performance by herself without the choir. Zach is telling Deacon that he wants to fire Bucky, and that it will help Maddie succeed with new management. Daphne is hanging out with the homeless teens again. Deacon, Maddie, and Bucky discuss Maddie's album release plans. Scarlett gets a text from Damien, saying he is in town. Juliette lies and tells Hallie that the label doesn't want her and the choir to perform. She has another episode, and Hallie calms her down, and while she is calming down she pictures a flashback of her and her dead dad. Daphne is with the homeless teens when they are stealing from a lumber yard, when they get caught and Liv gets hurt while trying to escape. Hallie tells the rest of the choir about the cancellation, but they are not happy and do not seem to believe Juliette's story. Daphne decides to take Liv home as she is hurt. Avery, after performing at CMA Fest, is offered a tour gig. Juliette is rehearsing, and she has another episode, she pictures memories of her dad and Jolene fighting. Juliette takes Avery home where she tells him she has to do this. Scarlett tells Damien she is pregnant, and he does not take it well. Daphne takes Liv home. Scarlett and Gunnar perform a new song. Deacon tells Bucky that Zach wants him gone. Juliette flashes back to her mom and dad having a fight, and her dad driving away. Juliette is talking to Hallie about her visions, but she's still upset. Hallie finds out about Juliette's deceit, so Hallie curses her out and tells her she only cares about herself. Juliette says she couldn't go and promote something nobody liked. Deacon finds out about Liv. We see a flashback to Juliette, and Jolene running home saying that Juliette's dad is not coming back home and something bad happened (after he drove off earlier). Deacon tells Daphne that they can't harbor kids in their house, but after talking with Liv, he tells her that she can stay. Damien comes to tell Scarlett he loves her and he wants to make things work. She says that that isn't true. Avery turns down his new manager's offer for a tour, saying Juliette needs him. Deacon heads out to Juliette's performance. Bucky leaves for good, saying it was his idea to quit, and he tells Deacon to be careful as he thinks he is only the first. The choir comes to sing, Juliette is happy about this. Flashbacks show a young Juliette talking to her dead dad, telling her he has to go, but to know that no matter whatever she does, he will be there watching over her, and he knows it will be great. Meanwhile, there now is a new love triangle - Scarlett, Damien, and Gunnar. We see Liv finding out that Daphne's mom was Rayna, and has died, and crying while looking at a picture of the family. We see Bucky walking out of the concert one last time, while Juliette finishes her performance, to cheers. Songs: "Run With Me" (sung by Avery); "The Hell of It Is" (sung by Scarlett and Gunnar)
100	14	"(Now and Then There's) A Fool Such as I"	John Carrafa	Callie Khouri	June 15, 2017	0.75
Juliette wants to start working on another album, and is desperate to have a hit. Disappointed in the demos that she was sent, she asks if she has to write the whole record herself. When she gets bumped from performing on Jimmy Kimmel Live it determines her to get her career back on track. Deacon is called to perform at the Bluebird though he is hesitant to do so. Bucky gives him some convincing words that Rayna might say. He agrees. When Deacon gets home he tells Daphne that Liv can't live with forever. Later on at the Bluebird he reconnects with an old Bluebird singer, Jessie Caine. Damien gets excited about being a parent, mentions the idea of co-parenting with Scarlett and Gunnar, and buys a mansion where the three of them plus the baby can all live. Scarlett and Gunnar doesn't know what think about the whole situation. Clay gets pulled over for supposedly doing a "rolling stop", though him and Maddie are sure that didn't happen. As the officer talks Clay is quiet while Maddie isn't. She keeps asking why he got pulled over then records the conversation on her phone. They both get arrested for not complying with the officer. Fortunately neither one of them are charged. The video ends up leaking online, and makes its way to the press. Clay decides to break up with her, tells her that they live in two different worlds, he gets why she stood up for him but tells her he could have got shot. When Juilette meets with a producer named Travis Stroud, he wants her to give Maddie a demo to listen to. She is tempted to keep it herself after listening to it, she wants to do the right thing and give it to Maddie but temptation gets the best of her. She calls Travis and lies to him that Maddie passed on it but she will be happy to record it. They then plan to write together sometime. Songs: "Beautiful Dream" (sung by Maddie and Clay); "When I Look at the World" (sung by Jessie); "Beautiful Dream [Ballad]" (sung by Maddie)
101	15	"A Change Would Do You Good"	Devon Gummersall	Matthew Ross	June 22, 2017	0.73
After the incident between Maddie, Clay and the cops, the press has made camp over at the Jaymes estate. All of the attention Maddie is receiving over it makes her upset, and she is advised to apologize for it to all work out. The whole ordeal has brought back details from Clay's past. Maddie misses Clay but he still wants some space. Bucky tries to comfort Maddie, and tells her there are some topics that are "no fly zones" for country music like the police, military and God. He warns her that the industry can be unforgiving. Juliette tells her that she shouldn't be afraid of a little controversy. Meanwhile Highway 65 meets their new marketing director, Alyssa Greene who knows nothing about the music industry or country music. Alyssa gives the idea of brand partnership. Juliette is unimpressed, Will is open to it, and Gunnar isn't sure. Juliette sets up a gig for Hallie at the Bluebird so everyone can hear her. Everyone is left impressed, and the label is interested in her. Hallie has some reservations on signing since the label only wants her and not her band too. Maddie goes to Clay's and they end up breaking up. Daphne helps Maddie make a video as a way to apologize about the ordeal with police. She is sorry for escalating the incident but not sorry for defending Clay. Songs: "Wrong Kind of Right" (sung by Hallie); "Water Rising" (sung by Juliette); "Wrong Kind of Right [Bluebird]" (sung by Hallie); "Love Until It Hurts" (sung by Maddie and Daphne)
102	16	"Not Ready to Make Nice"	Allan Arkush	Troy Putney	June 29, 2017	0.78
While Scarlett and Gunnar are getting gas they are interrupted when Natalie Morales of Access Hollywood appears on the gas pump's screen. She starts talking about the two while a paparazzi photo of a pregnant Scarlett is displayed. There is online speculation that Gunnar is the baby's father. Scarlett later on has lunch with a reporter where she accidentally let it slip that she hooked up with Damien one night. The women publishes the story, mentions that Damien is the father even though Scarlett didn't confess that he was. Scarlett finds out that she is having a girl. Someone made a GIF of the night Maddie was arrested, and turns out it was Liv who made it. Maddie is livid and lashes out at her. This causes a fight between Maddie and Daphne but they apologize and admit they are lost and confused without their mom around. Avery is working on Hallie's album, and Juliette gets suspicious whenever they interact with each other. She ends up lashing out at her, and says she isn't fooling anyone with her "little Miss Innocent routine". Avery is mortified at what she said to her, Hallie leaves angry. Songs: "Going Down the Road Feeling Bad" (sung by Hallie); "Who I Love" (sung by Hallie); "Count on Me" (sung by Hallie); "Tennis Shoes" (sung by Maddie and Daphne)
103	17	"Ghost in This House"	Maggie Greenwald	Richard Kramer	July 6, 2017	0.71
When Deacon and the girls are out to breakfast, a woman they bump into instantly starts flirting with him. Deacon ignores it and tells the girls they're the only girls in his life right now. A tabloid article is released claiming that Scarlett is cheating on Gunnar and got pregnant by another man. The Exes put on a small show where afterwards a fan name Nadine comes up to Scarlett and is all mad at her. Nadine tells Scarlett that she ruined her and Gunnar's perfect relationship. She believes what the tabloids say. Scarlett visits the reporter who wrote the story and calls her a manipulated liar. Mackenzie the reporter replies back with that if she sees a scoop she goes for it. Scarlett also does some research on Nadine on Facebook and finds out that she is talented artist, and is having some problems. She reaches out to her. Will heads to New York to film his Budweiser commercial. There he is reunited with Jakob Fine who is doing his wardrobe fitting. Jakob tells him that he used to have a thing with Zach, and fondly remembers him as the "boy who can buy whatever he wants." Will asks Zach if he is seeing anyone else besides him. Zach proves that he's not. During the night Zach's phone rings, Will goes to see who is calling and sees that it's a guy named Jeff. Will thinks that Zach lied and is also seeing this guy but Zach tells him he's not. Jeff is a guy who loves Zach but Zach doesn't love back anymore. He keeps his number because Jeff is fragile and is afraid of what might happen if he cuts off communication with him. Zach wants to sign Jessie Caine but Deacon isn't sure yet. He does have meeting with her. Avery informs Juilette that he is no longer producing Hallie's album because he know that she will get her way in the end. Songs: "As the Crow Flies" (sung by Scarlett and Gunnar); "Good Man" (sung by Will); "Learning How to Lose You" (sung by Jessie)
104	18	"The Night Before (Life Goes On)"	Michael Goi	Geoffrey Nauffts	July 13, 2017	0.63
Deacon is talking to a foster home about where they will put Liv. The foster home asks Deacon to get something Rayna wore for an auction. Juliette is talking with a video choreographer. Scarlett and Gunnar meet with Alyssa to plan a commercial shoot. Avery talks to Deacon about raising Cadence and ends up comforting Deacon about Rayna's death. Maddie has plans at a concert she is playing and Daphne has a party to go to. Scarlett and Gunnar start work on their commercial. Juliette is having trouble dancing during her commercial. Avery gets to Atlanta and flirts with a bartender. Maddie helps Daphne with makeup. Scarlett and Gunnar find out they are selling a crib. Daphne gets to the party, it's small, within an instant, everyone starts rolling on top of each other making out. Avery is drunk after the show in a crowded room, Juliette calls wanting to talk, when the bartender takes his phone, so Juliette decides to let Avery enjoy his night. Daphne and Finn talk. Jessie gets to the benefit, and switches her and Deacon's name cards so they do not have to sit next to each other. Scarlett and Gunnar are filming their commercial when Scarlett breaks down and cries.Avery talks to the bartender, drunk, about Juliette, and she flirts with him. Maddie and Daphne talk about the party. Scarlett has Gunnar stop to get milk. Deacon comes to comfort Jessie while she tells us about her personal life. Juliette calls Avery, where she gets jealous. They then talk about their life and who they are. Avery likes his life with Juliette and Cadence, Juliette tells him to do the tour. Scarlett and Gunnar come out of the store. A teen asks them to buy them beer and Gunnar says no, he pulls a gun out on them. Scarlett drops the milk, angering the teen who pushes her into a car, hitting her stomach on the car, and the kids run away after taunting Gunnar. Songs: "No One Cares About Your Dreams" (sung by Avery); "This is the Moment" (sung by Scarlett); "Dreaming My Dreams With You" (sung by Deacon)
105	19	"You Can't Lose Me"	Jesse Zwick	Savannah Dooley	July 20, 2017	0.72
Scarlett wakes up to bleeding and later finds out she has lost her baby. Enraged, Gunnar finds the boy and beats him almost to death. Gunnar can't help Scarlett better, and decides he needs to do soul-searching so he leaves for Texas. Jessie ends up comforting Scarlett about the miscarriage, who shares that she also had two miscarriages. Juliette and Maddie perform, and Juliette feeling bad, is awkward the whole performance. Maddie later finds out that Juliette stole the song. Scarlett sings a song dedicated to her would-be baby girl, Amelia Rose. Songs: "Forever" (sung by Scarlett)
106	20	"Speed Trap Town"	Jet Wilkinson	Jesse Zwick	July 27, 2017	0.72
Maddie is nominated for an American Music Award and so is Juliette. Jessie sings a song to Deacon. Gunnar comes back home to Texas to visit his grandma, who is about to die. Scarlett is at Deacon's old house when she hears a noise, grabs a knife, and hears the noise again. Scarlett goes to visit Deacon and the girls. Maddie suggests she take self defense class. Juliette talks to Glenn about the war with Maddie. Gunnar runs into an old flame. Deacon and Jessie talk about recording. Gunnar talks with his old flame. Scarlett goes to self defense class. Gunnar and the girl walk around an old school. Gunnar has a flashback to getting some bad news as a kid in school. The girl asks to see him again. Jessie and Deacon talk at a studio. Jessie has a visit from her ex. Gunnar looks around his old house. Deacon and Jessie record and talk a lot. Maddie tweets something to Juliette that she doesn't like. Scarlett goes back to self defense class. Gunnar talks to his old flame about his life when he was a kid. Jessie and Deacon talk again about her career. Gunnar apologizes to his grandma and sings her a song. Songs: "Coat of Pain" (sung by Jessie); "Texas Cookin'" (sung by Gunnar and Jason); "In the End" (sung by Gunnar)
107	21	"Farther On"	Michael Lohmann	Liberty Godhsall	August 3, 2017	0.74
Deacon gets a text telling him that they have a slot open at the Opry. Maddie is prepping to shoot a commercial. Zach is telling Deacon that they need to keep going to keep Highway 65 on the map. Avery calls Juliette who is at home saying Cadence has a cold, Avery is living the tour life. Deacon and Daphne tell Maddie she is the star. Deacon is working a lot. Maddie is at a party with Alyssa. The mascara people for Maddie's commercial tell Alyssa that the song doesn't connect with their mascara. Alyssa sings a song. Maddie is having a hard time on set, as the director keeps making changes and yelling cut. Deacon and Jessie are in the studio together. Avery unloads about his troubles with Juliette and their relationship to some girl on his tour bus. The mascara people want to change Maddie's lyrics for the song. Deacon is rehearsing at the Opry. Zach calls Deacon and tells him that Maddie had a breakdown on set and he needs to talk to her. Maddie tells Deacon that her songs are all she has. Deacon tells Zach and Alyssa that Maddie doesn't want to sell out, but they show Deacon a contract he signed that allows the commercial people to do whatever they want. Zach tells Deacon if he can't get Maddie in line, he will quit as he is sick of doing everything, and at the end of his ninety days, Highway 65 will be out of money. Deacon meets with the artists of Highway 65, except Juliette, and talks about Maddie's situation. They all back Maddie. Deacon says if they don't back Zach, it will be the end of Highway 65. Maddie says she'll change the words, but Daphne and everyone tell Deacon that's not what Rayna would have wanted, and they'll back Deacon on whatever he does. Jessie drives Deacon off to a trail and makes him go and take a walk. Deacon meets with Zach and Alyssa, and Deacon tells Zach that they won't change the lyric in Maddie's song. Zach gets angry and says that there is no way to get any money if they don't do branding, Deacon walks out. The tour girl tells Avery if he ever wants something less complicated to let her know. Maddie tells Deacon Rayna would have been proud. Pam Tillis introduces Deacon at the Opry for the first time since Rayna's death, and he sings three songs to a standing ovation. Zach, Alyssa, and Jessie watch as Daphne sees Deacon hugging Jessie. Songs: "You Don't Know Me" (sung by Alyssa); "Rose and Thorn" (sung by Avery); "Without You" (sung by Deacon); "Simple as That" (sung by Deacon); "Good Rain or Jesus" (sung by Deacon)
108	22	"Reasons to Quit"	Callie Khouri	Scott Saccoccio	August 10, 2017	0.68
Deacon is meeting with Jeffrey to talk about what would happen to Highway 65. Jeffrey offers to buy it under his label. Jessie says goodbye to her son. Juliette is hot because the air conditioner went off. The power goes out at Highway 65, as Zach has canceled their account. Highway 65's account has been drained. Daphne is going to a pool party. Highway 65 moved operation to a studio. The girls talk about Jessie and Deacon making music. Gunnar has found Zach. Deacon goes to talk to Zach, who taunts Deacon. Juliette and Glenn are at a pre-American Music Awards party. Daphne tells Deacon that Juliette stole Maddie's song. Deacon tells Juliette he will drop her. Jeffrey meets with Alyssa and Zach. Jeffrey makes an offer to Zach. Scarlett tells Gunnar that they were asked to play the Bluebird's anniversary show. Daphne is at a pool party. Juliette contacts MacKenzie Rhoades. Polly flirts with Avery. Daphne is jealous to see Flynn talking to someone else. Daphne talks to Jake, Jessie's son. Gunnar talks to Scarlett about his life, she tells him to search his soul by himself. Will talks to Zach and Zach tries to tell him he made him accepted, but will says that he already was accepted and breaks up with Zach. Everyone but Juliette and Avery has gathered at the Bluebird. Deacon and Alyssa talk about life and "what is good for them". Alyssa then kisses Deacon. Gunnar tells Scarlett that not everything is his fault, and she finds fault in everyone. Gunnar says he is done trying with her. They then perform, and the entire audience notices their sad and chemistry-lacking performance. MacKenzie calls Zach and tells him off, saying he destroyed Rayna's legacy and label. Zach threatens her with lawyers. He hangs up. It is then revealed that Juliette gave her the story, but won't let her print it. She says she has a story she will love that she can print. It's storming out. Polly comes to Avery's room and apologizes to him. On the news, they see that Juliette has withdrawn herself from her nomination and admitted to stealing Maddie's song. Avery leaves to go home and see Juliette. She didn't answer her phone and he has to drive home in a thunderstorm. Deacon and Daphne talk about Jessie. Jessie and Deacon have a scene, she tells him to take care of himself. Zach yells at Deacon for contacting MacKenzie, he denies it, but Zach doesn't believe him. Deacon asks him why he is still here, and says he thinks he is lonely. Deacon proposes a partnership to Zach. Juliette watches the American Music Awards. Maddie performs there. Scarlett moves out, but keeps a key. Avery is still driving home. Maddie does not win her award. Avery makes it home, Juliette is missing at first, but she comes out and the two kiss. Deacon and the girls drive back home as Maddie exclaims she feels free. Songs: "Clockwork" (sung by Maddie and Daphne); "Little Darlin'" (sung by Scarlett and Will)

== U.S. ratings ==
Viewership and ratings per episode of Nashville season 5
No.	Title	Air date	Rating (18–49)	Viewers (millions)	DVR (18–49)	DVR viewers (millions)	Total (18–49)	Total viewers (millions)
1	"The Wayfaring Stranger"	December 15, 2016	0.5; 0.3	2.89; 1.25	0.2	0.77	0.5	3.66
2	"Back in Baby's Arms"	January 5, 2017	0.3	1.20	0.3	0.93	0.6	2.13
3	"Let's Put it Back Together Again"	January 12, 2017	0.3	1.11	0.4	1.27	0.7	2.38
4	"Leap of Faith"	January 19, 2017	0.2	0.96	0.5	1.41	0.7	2.37
5	"Love Hurts"	January 26, 2017	0.2	0.93	0.4	1.28	0.6	2.22
6	"A Little Bit Stronger"	February 2, 2017	0.2	0.75	0.3	1.13	0.5	1.88
7	"Hurricane"	February 9, 2017	0.2	0.77	0.3	1.09	0.5	1.86
8	"Stand Beside Me"	February 16, 2017	0.2	0.83	0.3	1.07	0.5	1.90
9	"If Tomorrow Never Comes"	February 23, 2017	0.2	0.93	0.3	0.98	0.5	1.91
10	"I'll Fly Away"	March 2, 2017	0.3	1.12	—N/a	—N/a	—N/a	—N/a
11	"Fire and Rain"	March 9, 2017	0.2	0.97	0.4	1.28	0.6	2.25
12	"Back in the Saddle Again"	June 1, 2017	0.2	0.78	0.3	1.16	0.5	1.94
13	"Til I Can Make It On My Own"	June 8, 2017	0.2	0.69	0.3	1.06	0.5	1.76
14	"(Now and Then There's) A Fool Such as I"	June 15, 2017	0.2	0.75	0.3	1.02	0.5	1.77
15	"A Change Would Do You Good"	June 22, 2017	0.2	0.73	0.3	1.04	0.5	1.77
16	"Not Ready to Make Nice"	June 29, 2017	0.2	0.78	—N/a	—N/a	—N/a	—N/a
17	"Ghost in This House"	July 6, 2017	0.2	0.71	—N/a	—N/a	—N/a	—N/a
18	"The Night Before (Life Goes On)"	July 13, 2017	0.1	0.63	0.3	1.06	0.4	1.69
19	"You Can't Lose Me"	July 20, 2017	0.2	0.72	0.2	1.06	0.4	1.77
20	"Speed Trap Town"	July 27, 2017	0.2	0.72	—N/a	—N/a	—N/a	—N/a
21	"Farther On"	August 3, 2017	0.2	0.74	—N/a	0.96	—N/a	1.71
22	"Reasons to Quit"	August 10, 2017	0.2	0.68	0.2	1.00	0.4	1.68

=== Nick at Nite Ratings ===
Viewership and ratings per episode of Nashville season 5
No.	Title	Air date	Rating (18–49)	Viewers (millions)
1	"The Wayfaring Stranger"	December 15, 2016	—N/a	—N/a
2	"Back in Baby's Arms"	January 5, 2017	—N/a	—N/a
3	"Let's Put it Back Together Again"	January 12, 2017	—N/a	—N/a
4	"Leap of Faith"	January 19, 2017	—N/a	—N/a
5	"Love Hurts"	January 26, 2017	—N/a	—N/a
6	"A Little Bit Stronger"	February 2, 2017	—N/a	—N/a
7	"Hurricane"	February 9, 2017	0.2	—N/a
8	"Stand Beside Me"	February 16, 2017	0.2	0.49
9	"If Tomorrow Never Comes"	February 23, 2017	0.1	0.45
10	"I'll Fly Away"	March 2, 2017	0.2	—N/a
11	"Fire and Rain"	March 9, 2017	0.2	0.97
12	"Back in the Saddle Again"	June 1, 2017	—N/a	—N/a
13	"Til I Can Make It On My Own"	June 8, 2017	0.2	0.41
14	"(Now and Then There's) A Fool Such as I"	June 15, 2017	0.2	0.95
15	"A Change Would Do You Good"	June 22, 2017	0.2	0.53
16	"Not Ready to Make Nice"	June 29, 2017	0.2	0.61
17	"Ghost in This House"	July 6, 2017	—N/a	—N/a
18	"The Night Before (Life Goes On)"	July 13, 2017	0.2	0.58
19	"You Can't Lose Me"	July 20, 2017	0.2	0.48
20	"Speed Trap Town"	July 27, 2017	0.2	0.56
21	"Farther On"	August 3, 2017	0.2	0.49
22	"Reasons to Quit"	August 10, 2017	0.2	0.45
