= List of Fame (1982 TV series) episodes =

Fame is an American musical drama television series which premiered on NBC on January 7, 1982. The series is based on the 1980 film of the same name. In 1983, the series entered syndication, for which it remained until its conclusion in 1987. Six seasons and 136 episodes have been aired.

The series is available on DVD. Season One was released by Sony Pictures Home Entertainment on November 1, 2005, and is now out of print. 20th Century Fox Home Entertainment acquired the rights to release the series under license from MGM and released Seasons One & Two in a box set on September 15, 2009. Both releases were made available as individual sets on January 12, 2010, via 20th Century Fox. As of yet, there have been no plans to release the remaining seasons.

The following are a list of episodes.

== Series overview ==
| Season | Episodes | Originally released | | |
| Season | Episodes | First released | Last released | Network |
|---|---|---|---|---|
| 1 | 16 | January 7, 1982 | May 6, 1982 | NBC |
| 2 | 23 | September 30, 1982 | April 7, 1983 | NBC |
| 3 | 24 | October 15, 1983 | May 27, 1984 | Syndication |
| 4 | 25 | September 29, 1984 | May 25, 1985 | Syndication |
| 5 | 24 | October 12, 1985 | May 24, 1986 | Syndication |
| 6 | 24 | October 6, 1986 | May 18, 1987 | Syndication |

== Episodes ==
=== Season 1 (1982) ===
| No. overall | No. in season | Title | Directed by | Written by | Original release date |
|---|---|---|---|---|---|
| 1 | 1 | "Metamorphosis" | Bob Kelljan | Christopher Gore | January 7, 1982 |
Auditions introduce the School of the Arts main characters; oddball Julie Miller, funny Garcy, haughty diva Coco Hernandez, awkward misfit Montgomery McNeil, naïve loudmouth Doris Schwartz, reclusive Bruno Martelli and street smart Leroy Johnson. The teachers are dance instructor Lydia Grant, English teacher Elizabeth Sherwood and music teacher Benjamin Shorofsky. Songs: "Miles from Here", "Take Me", "Fame", "Red Light" Guest starring Fran Drescher (as Rhonda), Judy Farrell (as Mrs. Miller), and Tommy Aguilar (as Garcy). Co-starring Dallas Alinder (as Clerk) and Paul Joynt (as Michael). Featuring Rachael Orr (as Debbie), Eartha D. Robinson (as Phenicia), Lycia Naff (as Moira), and Ellia English (as Sheila). Jasmine Guy also appears as an unnamed background student.
| 2 | 2 | "Passing Grade" | Nicholas Sgarro | Story by : Lee H. Grant; Teleplay by : Lee H. Grant & William Blinn | January 14, 1982 |
Lydia's old boyfriend, Robert, offers her a part in a show and teaches Coco a lesson in the process when she applies for the "ethnic actress" part. Danny learns Johnny Carson is expected to dine at Danny's favorite restaurant, so he gets a job there. *The song "I Still Believe In Me", performed by Erica Gimpel and Debbie Allen and co-written by Gary Portnoy (co writer of "Cheers" theme song) was nominated for an Emmy Award for Best Original Song. Songs: "The Show Must Go On", "I Still Believe In Me" Guest starring Carmine Caridi (as Angelo Martelli) and William Allen Young (as Robert Summers). Co-starring Frank Dent (as Stage Manager), John Bernaber (Maitre d'), Jacquelyn Houston (Miss Douglas), Holly Rutherford (as Singer), William Ward (The Producer), and Rose Lewis (Protege).
| 3 | 3 | "Tomorrow's Farewell" | Thomas Carter | William Blinn | January 21, 1982 |
A school board evaluation involves observing and interviewing students about their priorities. Head inspector Melendez decides a gym is necessary, leading to a cardio contest between football players and the dancers. Leroy's estranged older brother Willard, just released from jail, moves in...bringing a gun, leading to Leroy's arrest while trying to dispose of it. Songs: "I Can Do Anything Better Than You Can", "Come What May" Guest starring Grand Bush (as Willard Johnson). Co-starring John Karlen (as Detective Kessler) and Vince Duke Milana (as Mr. Tipton). Featuring Gabriel Barre (as The Mime), Barbara Ann Grimes (Mrs. Polsdorfer), John Finn (Driver Cop), and Luis Avalos (as Mr. Melendez).
| 4 | 4 | "Alone in a Crowd" | Robert Scheerer | Glenn Gordon Caron | January 28, 1982 |
The School of the Arts 7th annual benefit has Montgomery running the auditions and show. Coco tries unsuccessfully to get performance shy Bruno to perform at the event, so Mr. Shorofsky changes his student proficiency tests to be performed in front of the class and addresses Bruno's fear. Danny shows bad sportsmanship when he fails to earn a place in the performance while Leroy's academic grades eliminate his performing. At the benefit a brown-out gives elevator trapped Danny and Doris a deeper understanding of each other. Songs: "Alone in the Crowd", "We Got the Power To Be" Guest starring Carmine Caridi (as Angelo Martelli). Also starring Michael Thoma (as Gregory Crandall). Co-starring Larry Gilman (as Trainee Agent). Featuring Leslie Vallen (as Hotel Guest) and Lance Stevens (as Accordion Player).
| 5 | 5 | "To Soar and Never Falter" | Harry Harris | William Blinn | February 4, 1982 |
Dance major Kathleen's audition for the Ran Tyler dancer troop causes Miss Grant to ask Bruno for an original piece, but Bruno and Kathleen can't agree on the music concept. Kathleen falls and her audition is postponed due to the minor injury. Her prior diagnosis of multiple sclerosis causes the insurance company to decide to remove her from the school. Doris tells Bruno about Kathleen's impending removal when Bruno and Kathleen become romantically involved. Leroy fills in for Kathleen, then fakes an injury to make a place for her return. Danny doesn't want to perform a love scene with tall Julie, so the kids stage the scene to get around Danny's height issue. Songs: "Be My Music", "Ballet for Kathy" (instrumental) Guest starring Carmine Caridi (as Angelo Martelli) and Connie Needham (as Kathleen Murphy). Also starring Michael Thoma (as Gregory Crandall). Co-starring Stanley Grover (as Marvin Rutledge), Marie Wallace (as Mrs. Murphy), Gregory Itzin (as Dr. Reston), and Garrison True (as David).
| 6 | 6 | "The Sellout" | Thomas Carter | Gary Kott | February 11, 1982 |
Coco's authoritative teaching methods while instructing the dance class choreography mid-term upsets her peers. Mister Shorofsky chooses Julie to play in the ensemble for Coco's project, so jealous Coco torments Julie during rehearsals and blames it on astrology. Bruno promises an original lullaby for his aunt's new baby who is due very soon, but gets too busy. Mr. Martelli causes a small fire in one of Bruno's synthesizers, so he buys a new expensive synthesizer but must work extra shifts to pay for it, resulting in a fatigue injury. Bruno secretly gets a part-time job with a polka band and finishes the lullaby. Songs: "It's Sonata Mozart" (instrumental), "Could We Be Magic Like You", "Hi-Fidelity" Guest starring Carmine Caridi (as Angelo Martelli). Co-starring Estelle Omens (as Mrs. Goldman) and David Paymer (as The Salesman). Featuring Michael DeLorenzo (as The Student).
| 7 | 7 | "The Strike" | Thomas Carter | Danny Jacobson & Barry Vigon | February 18, 1982 |
Montgomery is stage manager for the school production of "Othello," but a pending union strike makes faculty involvement questionable. Coco, believing she's the better actress, is upset when Julie gets the part of Desdemona. Mr. Shorofsky supervises the music, but he and Bruno disagree on the direction of the score. Both Mr. Shorofsky and Miss Grant are opposed to the strike, but all the teachers are expected to picket. Montgomery unites the students and Coco volunteers to help with choreography, but Leroy fears Shakespearian literature and drops his lead role. Bruno struggles with the music, an early rehearsal proves disastrous and Leroy's absence is a problem. Leroy gets private tutoring from Miss Sherwood, Mr. Shorofsky approves of Bruno's composition and the production is a success. Songs: "Desdemona", "Starmaker" Also starring Michael Thoma (as Gregory Crandall). Co-starring Ann Nelson (as Mrs. Berg) and Michael Jerry-Lee (as Poker Player).
| 8 | 8 | "Street Kid" | Robert Scheerer | Story by : Marc Rubin; Teleplay by : Marc Rubin and William Blinn | February 25, 1982 |
When Mr. Crandall's assignment requires an improv scene portraying a character far removed from themselves, Doris pretends to be a teenage prostitute to "research" her role. She discovers a real 16-year-old prostitute, Tracy, and convinces her mom to take Tracy in after their arrest. Doris convinces the staff to allow Tracy an audition that goes badly and then Doris convinces the runaway to call her parents and performs her enlightening improv piece. Mr. Shorofsky buys a classic car and asks Miss Sherwood to teach him to drive. Songs: "Life is a Celebration" Guest starring Madlyn Rhue (as Mrs. Schwartz) and Dominique Dunne (as Tracy). Also starring Michael Thoma (as Gregory Crandall). Co-starring Del Monroe (as Detective Dellinger) and Monica Francis Pegé (as Flashy Dressed Woman).
| 9 | 9 | "But Seriously, Folks" | Alan J. Levi | Parke Perine | March 4, 1982 |
Danny's attitude and performance have dwindled and the staff discover he's been working early mornings as the stage manager at a late night comedy club. The club's star comedian gives Danny caffeine pills as a "gift" and the overwhelmed Danny turns to the drugs before performing. His work violates the no professional work clause of the school and endangers his education. Danny's father ignores the drugs until the kids intrude on his Saint Anthony Lodge event. Doris wins the part in a commercial for Hank Burgers, but detests both the director and the burgers. Songs: "Come What May", "Step Up to the Mike" Also starring Michael Thoma (as Gregory Crandall) and Ric Mancini (as Mr. Amatullo). Co-starring Lola Mason (as Mrs. Amatullo), Gregg Berger (as The Comedian), Stanley DeSantis (as The Director), Larry Miller (The Emcee) and Jack Murdock (The Club Owner). Featuring Bob Basso (as The Doorman), Liis Kailey (The Assistant), and Michael Perotta (Fiorino).
| 10 | 10 | "Come One, Come All" | Robert Scheerer | Hindi Brooks | March 11, 1982 |
Montgomery's movie star mother is directing the school's variety show but wants to use it for herself. Songs: "Sing, Sing, Sing (With a Swing)" (instrumental) Guest starring Carmine Caridi (as Angelo Martelli). Special Guest Star Gwen Verdon (as Melinda MacNeill). Co-starring Ann Nelson (as Mrs. Berg).
| 11 | 11 | "The Crazies" | Mel Swope | William Blinn | March 18, 1982 |
Doris and Montgomery agree to tell the truth for an entire day. Doris' suggestion that Michelle has big hips makes her insecure and Doris reveals to Miss Sherwood that Miss Grant doubts her ability to perform an African tribal dance, resulting in the teachers trading places. Montgomery reveals to Mr. Shorofsky that the class didn't practice their assignment. Everyone puts their petty differences aside when Mr. Shorofsky is attacked by an intruder in the school and the show is reworked so as not to dishonour him. Songs: "I Was Only Trying To Help", "Carnival" Also starring Michael Thoma (as Gregory Crandall), Bronwyn Thomas (as Michelle), and Ann Nelson (as Mrs. Berg). Co-starring Will Jarvis (as Hall Monitor) and D.J . Sydney (as Nurse). Featuring Diana Long (as Night Nurse), Sandy Serrano (as Deidre), Barbara Ziff (as Nurse's Aide), Stephanie Williams (as Girl), and Michael DeLorenzo (as Michael).
| 12 | 12 | "Exposé" | Harry Harris | Bruce Shelly | March 25, 1982 |
Julie's mom is apprehensive about job hunting, causing Julie to be replaced by a mannequin when she fails to attend rehearsal. Miss Sherwood's graduate student, Jeff Harris, has a hidden agenda and becomes romantically involved with Julie, claiming he's only writing an article about her move from Grand Rapids to New York City. Julie's mom learns after she's being hired her as a numbers' runner and Julie discovers Jeff is scheming to scandalize both Julie and the school, resulting in the two contemplating moving back to Grand Rapids. Songs: "Mannequin", "It's Gonna Be A Long Night" Guest starring Judy Farrell (as Charlotte Miller) and Brian Patrick Clarke (as Jeff Harris). Co-starring Martin Speer (as David Gibb).
| 13 | 13 | "A Musical Bridge" | Robert Scheerer | Bruce Shelly | April 1, 1982 |
Miss Sherwood overhears Leroy asking Danny to let him copy his assignment and asks his parents to come in. She finally goes to Leroy's house to confront them and excuses him when she learns he lives in a meager apartment alone. Miss Grant chastises her and says to challenge him again for his own sake. Bruno composes a mindless song parodying Mr. Shorofsky to prove popular music is noise, but Montgomery secretly records the song and submits it to a local new wave band. With a flimsy record contract possible, the gang expresses its concern with Montgomery's exploitation of Bruno just when Mr. Shorofcky makes Bruno realize that he shouldn't compromise his integrity for money. Songs: "Sho Sho Sho Shorofsky", "Do The Gimme That" Guest starring Carmine Caridi (as Angelo Martelli). Co-starring Ann Nelson (as Mrs. Berg).
| 14 | 14 | "A Big Finish" | Robert Douglas | William Blinn | April 15, 1982 |
After finishing her morning jog, Miss Sherwood discovers a dog in the school with the janitor Tim. When she asks him of the dog's whereabouts, he denies seeing a dog. We learn shortly that he is indeed aware of the animal. Doris' allergies act up in the presence of dogs or people who have been around them confirming Miss Sherwood's discovery of a dog in the school. Miss Sherwood confronts Tim who gets upset by the accusation of being a liar. Curious, Doris gets Bruno and Danny to try to find where the dog is being kept. They discover old Broadway dancer Birdie Whelan has been living in the janitor's quarters after falling short of his rent. He's the owner of the dog and old dance rival Tim has been hiding him there. The kids decide to keep their secret to spare Tim's job and Birdie's living space but of course in the school of the arts, that doesn't happen. They plan a benefit to raise money for the two. The kids arrange a benefit for Tim and Birdie but Miss Sherwood informs them that they would be expelled for courting favour for an employee. Determined to do the benefit, Doris revamps the benefit as a fundraiser for Clumpy, the dog. On a lighter note, Birdie is aware of Leroy's dancing talents and encourages him to listen to Miss Grant. Meanwhile, Mr. Shorofsky has order a table tennis table in which he plans to move into Miss Grant's classroom. Mr. Shorofsky creams Julie and Mr. Crandall and breaches his agreement to store the table against the wall. Miss Grant sets up a match between Mr. Shorofsky and Lang Peyton-Smythe, a neighbour of hers, and she defeats him. Songs: "We're A Couple of Swells", "You're the Real Music" Guest starring Art Carney (as Tim O'Bannion) and Ray Walston (as Birdie Whelan). Co-starring Bronwyn Thomas (as Michelle) and Lang Yun (as Lang Peyton-Smythe).
| 15 | 15 | "Reunions" | John Patterson | Steve Kline | April 29, 1982 |
Mr. Shorofsky's old girlfriend, and survivor of the Holocaust decides to pay him a visit. Leroy wants his mother to be present for parents' day, but neither of them can afford to have her flown in from Detroit. The gang decides to surprise Leroy. Songs: "Hope" Guest starring Signe Hasso (as Frieda Grauer), Royce Wallace (as Mrs. Johnson), and James Purcell (as Wally Zawicky). Co-starring Ben Slack (as Store Owner), Bronwyn Thomas (as Michelle), E. Danny Murphy (as Pool Player), and Ann Nelson (as Mrs. Berg).
| 16 | 16 | "A Special Place" | Robert Scheerer | Parke Perine | May 6, 1982 |
When Bruno learns that a famous composer stole his original music, he decides to find and confront him. Budget cutbacks call for the termination of one of the school's teachers: either Sherwood or Crandall. Crandall gets cut, but the teachers meet with city board representatives to offer putting off their raises in order to keep Crandall. The kids gather around Crandall at his goodbye party and sing "Starmaker." Crandall's job is saved for one year in exchange for the school not getting approved new lighting in the auditorium. To celebrate, the kids sing and dance to "Hot Lunch" (played in the original film). Coco does not appear in this episode. Songs: "A Very Special Place", "Starmaker", "Hot Lunch Jam" Guest starring Jeff Pomerantz (as Paul Forbes), Michael Thoma (as Greg Crandall). Co-starring Sam Weisman (as the composer), Ann Nelson (as Mrs. Berg) and Barbara Ann Grimes (as Mrs. Polsdorfer).

=== Season 2 (1982–83) ===
| No. overall | No. in season | Title | Directed by | Written by | Original release date |
|---|---|---|---|---|---|
| 17 | 1 | "And the Winner is..." | Marc Daniels | Max Tash | September 30, 1982 |
When Bruno's script is chosen for the school production, he finds he may have bitten off more than he can chew when he can't decide whom to cast. Problems arise when Bruno casts himself in the lead role. Songs: "Beautiful Dreamer" Co-starring Jonathan Fox (as Norman), Ann Nelson (as Mrs. Berg), David Greenlee (as Dwight), Stephanie E. Williams (as Stephanie Harrison), and Michael DeLorenzo (as Michael), Larry Zerner (as Stage Manager), Rachel Bard (as Substitute Teacher)
| 18 | 2 | "Your Own Song" | Stan Lathan | Leah Markus | October 7, 1982 |
Coco finds difficulty trying to get along with Troy Phillips, a disabled new student. Guest starring Jimmy Osmond (as Troy Phillips) and Krista Errickson (as Diana). Co-starring Laura Pritchartt (as Karen), Jorge Rivas (as Tommy), Ann Nelson (as Mrs. Berg), Nancy Berggren (as Teacher), Jack Eiseman (as Clerk). Featuring Roberta Stuart (as Helen Phillips).
| 19 | 3 | "Feelings" | Robert Scheerer | Christopher Beaumont | October 14, 1982 |
Julie is given the impression that her dad is considering a reconciliation with her mother only to find that her father plans to marry another woman. After losing his part as the lead in a school production for repeated tardiness, Leroy considers dropping out of school to join a dance troupe. Co-starring Jim McKrell (as Julie's Father), David Greenlee (as Dwight), Michael DeLorenzo (as Michael), Stephanie E. Williams (as Stephanie Harrison), and Eartha D. Robinson (as Eartha).
| 20 | 4 | "Class Act" | Robert Scheerer | William Blinn | October 21, 1982 |
A famous dancer, who happens to be in town preparing for a show, charms Lydia and is invited to the school as a guest speaker to give the kids some insight into being famous. When Lydia begins a relationship with him, she has to deal with the downside of his lavish lifestyle. Guest starring Carmine Caridi (as Angelo Martelli), Glynn Turman (as Ben Pettit), and Beverly Hart (as Lisa). Co-starring David Packer (as Waiter), Theodore Stone (as Drummer), and Laurie Rose (as Belly Dancer).
| 21 | 5 | "Teachers" | Robert Scheerer | Ken Cauthern | October 28, 1982 |
Bruno has to choose between Shorofsky and his father's wishes when he's offered a chance to audition for a scholarship to Juilliard. Lydia butts heads with her employer Richard Simmons at her new second time job as an aerobics teacher. Doris and Leroy don't appear in this episode. Guest starring Carmine Caridi (as Angelo Martelli) and Joan Crosby (as Renee). Co-starring Ann Nelson (as Mrs. Berg), Eric Morris (as Panel Member), Michael DeLorenzo (as Michael), David Greenlee (as Dwight), and Wayne Dvorak (as Waiter). Special Guest Star Richard Simmons (as Himself).
| 22 | 6 | "Beginnings" | Robert Scheerer | Ralph Farquhar and Kevin Rodney Sullivan | November 4, 1982 |
Leroy's girlfriend, Stephanie, and the rest of the gang suspect that their ballet teacher is racist. Miss Grant confirms this when she confronts the teacher. Bruno is chosen to escort the new kid, a young musical prodigy, around the school. Guest starring Sydney Penny (as Susan) and Richard McGonagle (as Simon Marshall). Co-Starring Joni Palmer (as Joni), Marguerite Pomerhn (as Marguerite), Ann Nelson (as Mrs. Berg), and Stephanie E. Williams (as Stephanie Harrison). Special Guest Star Marge Champion (as Ann Carlton).
| 23 | 7 | "Solo Song" | Mel Swope | Linda Elstad | November 11, 1982 |
Jim Hamilton, a blind substitute teacher, interferes with Lydia's preparations for a school performance that members of the school board are expected to attend. Guest Starring Terry Alexander (as Mr. Belmont). Co-Starring Charles Alvin Bell (as Mr. Collins), Bill Quinn (as Janitor), Ann Nelson (as Mrs. Berg), David Greenlee (as Dwight), Michael DeLorenzo (as Michael), Cynthia Cypert (as Young Lady), and Tim Wead (as Oedipus). Special Guest Star Tom Sullivan (as Jim Hamilton).
| 24 | 8 | "Winners" | Robert Scheerer | Steven Hensley & J. Miyoko Hensley | November 18, 1982 |
Coco auditions for a major film role. Doris, influenced by Coco's many successes, goes on a crash diet in an attempt to be one step closer to perfect. Guest starring Carmine Caridi (as Angelo Martelli) and Duncan Ross (as Charles McKay). Co-Starring Edwin Avedissian (as Eddie), Lila Teigh (as Wife), Ann Nelson (as Mrs. Berg), David Greenlee (as Dwight), Bronwyn Thomas (as Michelle), and Marguerite Pomerhn (as Marguerite).
| 25 | 9 | "Words" | Peter Levin | Christopher Beaumont | November 25, 1982 |
Coco is being pressured by her boyfriend to have sex. As he's preparing to join the Navy, Coco tries to get him to go back to school. When Miss Sherwood finds blacked out words in her student, Jennie's book, she learns that her student is a victim of censorship under her stepfather's ruling. Co-starring Tracey E. Bregman (as Jenny), Thom Fox (as Julio), David Greenlee (as Dwight), and Richard Venture (as Mr. McClain).
| 26 | 10 | "Childhood's End" | Marc Daniels | Parke Perine | December 2, 1982 |
After the recent death of her grandmother, Coco questions her ambitions to be a performer. When Julie's cello goes missing, the gang decides help her find it. Guest starring Carmine Caridi (as Angelo Martelli). Co-starring Leonard Gaines (as Pawn Broker), Merrill Leighton (as Nurse Connelly), Bronwyn Thomas (as Michelle). Featuring Ted Noose (as Det. Kessler), Lily Mariye (as Dr. Chen), Michael DeLorenzo (as Michael), James Hardie (as Stage Manager), Eartha Robinson (as Eartha), Dawn Reilly (as Lynn)
| 27 | 11 | "Homecoming" | Peter Levin | Ken Berg | December 9, 1982 |
When Doris unexpectedly runs into her estranged brother at school, she sets out to reunite him and their father after years of not speaking to each other. When Mrs. Berg mistakenly invites Lydia's old ballet teacher to a school performance, Lydia incorporates ballet moves into her Jazz routine in order to impress her former teacher. Guest starring Carmine Caridi (as Angelo Martelli), Bruno Kirby (as Marty Shwartz), Gerald S. O'Loughlin (as Mr. Schwartz), and Madlyn Rhue (as Mrs. Schwartz). Diana Webster (as Louise Stefanovich), Judith Searle (as Dr. Reynolds), Tom Middleton (as Joel Bates), Ann Nelson (as Mrs. Berg), David Greenlee (as Dwight), Michael DeLorenzo (as Michael), and Bronwyn Thomas (as Michelle).
| 28 | 12 | "A Tough Act to Follow" | Jack Bender | Virginia Aldridge | December 16, 1982 |
Danny has a hard time dealing with the sudden death of his favorite teacher, Mr. Crandall. David's father tries to renew their relationship after David makes it clear he wants nothing to do with him. Co-starring Stuart Charno (as Clerk), Andrew Ethier (as Lester), Thomas McGreevey (as Tom Reardon), Co-starring Ann Nelson (as Mrs. Berg), David Greenlee (as Dwight), Stephanie E. Williams (as Stephanie Harrison), and Bronwyn Thomas (as Michelle). Note: Michael Thoma, who played Mr. Crandall in several season one episodes, passed away in real life a few weeks before the second season began filming.
| 29 | 13 | "Relationships" | Robert Scheerer | Scott Brody | January 6, 1983 |
Bruno, Leroy and Doris scheme their way into a country and western dance club in an attempt to put a new spin on their school production of "Romeo and Juliet." Doris meets and falls for a regular performer at the bar. Bruno starts seeing a 30-year-old waitress from the bar. Miss Sherwood hooks up with a man through a dating service. Special Guest Star Greg Evigan (as Will). Guest Stars Pamela Susan Shoop (as Nancy), Bruce French (as Mr. Mitchell), Hoke Howell (as Stetson). Co-starring Ann Nelson (as Mrs. Berg).
| 30 | 14 | "Star Quality" | Robert Scheerer | Scott Brody | January 13, 1983 |
Leroy is at risk of being failed out of school when he doesn't turn in his report. Leroy discovers he's being followed around school by a little boy. With the help of the talented dancing little boy and his father, a former tap dancer himself, Leroy comes up with the idea to base his report on the life of the former dancer. A television commercial actor is brought in to give advice to the students. Special Guest Star Arte Johnson (as Cliff). Co-starring Vernon Washington (as Charlie Washington), Ann Nelson (as Mrs. Berg) and Bronwyn Thomas (as Michelle). And Introducing Christopher Lewis (as Lewis Washington).
| 31 | 15 | "Sunshine Again" | Harry Harris | Kelly Woods Adams & Reneé Orin Hague | January 20, 1983 |
Bruno's father is troubled by the thought of aging as his birthday nears. Bruno and Shorofsky promise the dress rehearsal for a school show to different people. Doris is uncomfortable with her grandmother moving in with her and her family. Nia Peeples appears as a guest star here playing another character, but would return in Season 4 in the starring role of Nicole Chapman. Guest starring Carmine Caridi (as Angelo Martelli) and Madlyn Rhue (as Mrs. Schwartz). Co-starring Ivor Barry (as Maitre'd), Nia Peeples (as Girlfriend), Ann Nelson (as Mrs. Berg), and Bronwyn Thomas (as Michelle). Special Guest Appearance Nancy Walker (as Rachel) and Betty White (as Catherine).
| 32 | 16 | "Love is the Question" | Robert Scheerer | Leah Markus | January 27, 1983 |
Troy Phillips, who has a crush on Julie, tells everyone at school that they slept together after a night of studying ended with the two fast asleep on the couch at Troy's place. After Mr. Reardon's old college friend, a sleezy reporter, stays with him for a short time, a picture of Mr. Reardon in a speedo on his water polo team comes out in a gossip tabloid. Guest starring Dana Kimmell (as Melanie), and David Ruprecht (as Bernie). Co-starring Ann Nelson (as Mrs. Berg). Featuring Roberta Stuart (as Mrs. Phillips), and Bronwyn Thomas (as Michelle). Special Guest Star Jimmy Osmond (as Troy Phillips).
| 33 | 17 | "Blood, Sweat and Circuits..." | Richard Kinon | Lee Curreri | February 12, 1983 |
Miss Sherwood challenges Bruno to create art solely with a computer. Bruno willingly accepts the challenge until he learns that the computer was brought in to replace Mrs. Berg. Leroy suggests that they hide the computer and when the computer goes missing, Leroy is blamed. Guest starring Carmine Caridi (as Angelo Martelli). Co-starring Ann Nelson (as Mrs. Berg), David Greenlee (as Dwight), Renee Orin (as Mrs. Kiley), David Sheehan (as Mailman), and Ron Troncatty (as Mover). Special Guest Star Brenda Vaccaro (as Herself).
| 34 | 18 | "Friendship Day" | Robert Scheerer | Judy Farrell & Donny R. Lee | February 17, 1983 |
Preparations for "Friendship Day" at the school have everyone on edge. With Doris in charge, her domineering behaviour turns the student body against her. Julie's mother and Bruno's father think that Bruno and Julie are planning to have sex. Guest starring Judy Farrell (as Charlotte Miller), Elizabeth Daily (as Smokey), and Carmine Caridi (as Angelo Martelli). Co-starring Ann Nelson (as Mrs. Berg), David Greenlee (as Dwight), Michael DeLorenzo (as Michael), Bronwyn Thomas (as Michelle), Marguerite Pomerhn (as Marguerite).
| 35 | 19 | "Not in Kansas Anymore" | Robert Scheerer | Story by : Paul Rubell & William Blinn; Teleplay by : William Blinn | February 24, 1983 |
Miss Sherwood has Doris pulled from the school revue when her midterm essay doesn't turn up. Doris insists she's submitted it but her protests fall on deaf ears, except for Lydia, who is the only one who believes her. Angered, Doris slips, bumps her head on a step, and dreams she's entered the "Land of Oz" with Miss Sherwood as the Wicked Witch, Miss Grant as the Good Witch, Leroy, Danny, and Bruno play, respectively, the Scarecrow, the Lion, and the Tin man, and Mr. Shorofsky plays the Wizard of Oz. Guest starring Elizabeth Daily (as Darlene Smolinsky). Co-starring Ann Nelson (as Mrs. Berg), David Greenlee (as Dwight), Michael DeLorenzo (as Michael), and Bronwyn Thomas (as Michelle).
| 36 | 20 | "The Kids from Fame in Concert" | Terry Sanders | Draper Lewis | March 3, 1983 |
Contains excerpts from the Fame cast's live concert billed as The Kids from Fame in the United Kingdom. Note: This episode is not featured on the DVD of Fame, Season 2. Guest starring George Burns (as Himself).
| 37 | 21 | "...Help from My friends" | Georg Stanford Brown | Parke Perine | March 10, 1983 |
After a hallway of school lockers is vandalized, Dwight finds a suicide note. Doris tries to enlist her friends to help her find the author of the note. Guest starring Connie Needham (as Kelly Hayden). Also starring Lee Montgomery (as Timmy Ellis) and Janet Wood (as Janet Hammond). Co-starring Russ Marin (as Mr. Karpinsky) and David Greenlee (as Dwight).
| 38 | 22 | "Ending on a High Note" | Jack Bender | Christopher Beaumont | March 31, 1983 |
Lydia blackmails Leroy and Danny into assisting her friend Brother Timothy in order to be a part of the school's Alumni production alongside a famous Alumnus. It turns out that the help he was looking for was a coach for his church basketball team. When the dates for the dress rehearsal for the show and the game conflict the boys are torn between the team and the production. Guest starring Connie Needham (as Kelly Hayden). Co-starring Peter Jurasik (as Brother Timothy), Rick Podell (as Coach Jordan), Ann Nelson (as Mrs. Berg), David Greenlee (as Dwight), Malcolm-Jamal Warner (as Lucas Boyd), Keith Coogan (as Andy), John Salazar (as Mitchell), Richard Doyle (as Priest), and Frank Picard (as Brother Marcel).
| 39 | 23 | "U.N. Week" | Mel Swope | Parke Perine | April 7, 1983 |
The school hosts "U.N. Week" with Emerson High School and the kids find getting along to be difficult as the kids from Emerson High act snobbishly toward them. As Lydia secretly helps Mr. Reardon prepare for an audition, rumours start to spread of an affair between the pair. Note: Danny Amatullo does a hand gesture in front of his partner, but the gesture is unseen and when his partner is about to reveal what the hand gesture was, the screen is frozen and Ms. Sherwood speaks up. Guest starring Connie Needham (as Kelly Hayden). Co-Starring Robert Hitt (as Mr. Cannon), Kristen Vigard (as Alicia), Ann Nelson (as Mrs. Berg), David Greenlee (as Dwight), Dean Devlin (as Brad), Otis Sallid (as Brent), and Nancy Cartwright (as Muffin).

=== Season 3 (1983–84) ===
| No. overall | No. in season | Title | Directed by | Written by | Original release date |
|---|---|---|---|---|---|
| 40 | 1 | "Gonna Learn How to Fly: Part 1" | William F. Claxton | William Blinn | October 15, 1983 |
The show takes place at the start of the new school year. When Bruno's father unexpectedly dies, he is forced to drop out of school with no means of funding his schooling. Two new students Christopher Donlan, a dance major, and Holly Laird, a drama major, immediately find difficulty being accepted most notably by their more seasoned competition, Leroy and Doris. Quentin Morloch, the new vice-principal, takes over with the intent to rule with an iron fist. Coco, Danny and Doris find out that even though her mother still lives in New York City, Julie is married and now lives in Texas. Guest starring Judy Farrell (as Charlotte Miller). Co-starring Michael DeLorenzo (as Michael), Richard Stanley (as Intern), D.J. Sydney (as Nurse), Jeffrey Budin (as Trombone Player), and Ann Nelson (as Mrs. Berg).
| 41 | 2 | "Gonna Learn How to Fly: Part 2" | William F. Claxton | William Blinn | October 22, 1983 |
After Bruno leaves school, Mr. Shorofsky finds him a job as a waiter at "Caruso's," a coffee house where Bruno is free to play his music. Leroy and Christopher decide to settle their feud with a fist fight. With Bruno's friends ready to help welcome Bruno at his new job, Doris is unwilling to take part in the celebration. When Miss Grant decides to downgrade Christopher to a different class, Leroy works with him in an effort to keep him in the same class as he is in. Co-starring Ann Nelson (as Mrs. Berg), Michael DeLorenzo (as Michael), David Greenlee (as Dwight), Seth Kaufman (as Waiter), and Dave Shelley (as Don Caruso).
| 42 | 3 | "Hail to the Chief" | Robert C. Thompson | Ralph Farquhar & Kevin Rodney Sullivan | October 29, 1983 |
When Quentin Murloch and the rest of the school find out the President of the U.S. plans to show up to watch the school's fundraiser performance, certain elements of the show are reevaluated, including a monologue by Danny. With the President expected to attend the show, Leroy refuses to perform. Miss Sherwood is being considered a security risk. (Special Guest Star and Female impersonator, Charles Pierce, plays a bag lady). Guest starring Morgan Stevens (as David Reardon), Madlyn Rhue (as Angela Schwartz), Dave Shelley (as Don Caruso), René LeVant (as Agent Crane). Special Guest Appearance by Charles Pierce (as Bag Lady). Co-starring David Greenlee (as Dwight), Bronwyn Thomas (as Michelle), Robert Dowdell (as Air Force Major), Donegan Smith (as Agent Schroeder), Charles Douglass (as Young Man), and Ann Nelson (as Mrs. Berg).
| 43 | 4 | "The Kids from 'Fame' in Israel" | Yossi Zemach | Unknown | November 5, 1983 |
This episode features the cast of "Fame," billed as "The Kids from Fame," along with the season three regular dancers in a special concert performance taped while on tour in Tel Aviv, Israel. The concert features performances, by the cast, of songs from the television series. The concert took place in an indoor stadium in Tel Aviv before a live capacity audience. Along with the concert, the cast from "Fame" are shown visiting historical landmarks within the city during the 35th birthday celebration of the nation. (Debbie Allen staged and choreographed the entire concert). Starring Debbie Allen, Lee Curreri, Erica Gimpel, Carlo Imperato, Valerie Landsburg, and Gene Anthony Ray.
| 44 | 5 | "Knockout" | William F. Claxton | William Blinn | November 12, 1983 |
When Christopher is challenged by Keach Howard, the last man Chris defeated, to a boxing match, Chris is adamant about not fighting and remaining focused on his dancing. When Keach meets Dwight and finds out that he is friends with Donlan, he beats him up. Chris seeks to avenge his friend injury. Leroy becomes a mentor to Billy Hall, a fellow dancer in Miss Grant's class who Leroy sees a lot of himself in. Guest starring Dave Shelley (as Don Caruso) and Warren Vanders (as Gordie). Co-starring David Greenlee (as Dwight), Randy Shields (as Keach Howard), Derrick Brice (as Billy Hall), and Bronwyn Thomas (as Michelle). Featuring Gilbert Combs (as Opponent), Eartha D. Robinson (as Singer), Margaret Williams (as Singer), Darryl Tribble (as Singer), and Ann Nelson (as Mrs. Berg).
| 45 | 6 | "Rules" | Marc Daniels | Virginia Aldridge | November 19, 1983 |
Bruno, unwittingly, falls for Lisa Connors, a student-teacher for Mr. Shorofsky. Although the two are comfortable with their relationship, members of the faculty do not feel that relationship is appropriate. Mr. Morloch expresses an interest in Miss Sherwood. Guest starring Jennifer Holmes (as Lisa Connors) and Dave Shelley (as Don Caruso). Co-starring Bronwyn Thomas (as Michelle). Featuring Seth Kaufman (as Rick) and Ann Nelson (as Mrs. Berg).
| 46 | 7 | "Consequences" | Michael A. Hoey | Billy Field | November 26, 1983 |
When Mr. Morloch announces that all students participating in any school production must have a minimum C average, the students become upset about their scores. Against Mr. Morcloch's objections, Mr. Sherwood assigns the students the responsibility of the teacher with Leroy making the tests and Danny grading them. Danny is forced to make a tough decision when he suspects a friend has cheated. Guest starring Morgan Stevens (as David Reardon). Co-starring David Greenlee (as Dwight), Dave Nicolson (as Mr. Todd), Michael DeLorenzo (as Michael), Bronwyn Thomas (as Michelle), Derrick Brice (as Billy Hall), and Ann Nelson (as Mrs. Berg).
| 47 | 8 | "Break Dance" | Michael Peters | Michael McGreevey | December 10, 1983 |
When Tino, the leader of the gang, the Enforcers, asks Danny to find him a choreographer, Danny enlists Christopher and Michael to coach rival gangs, the Enforcers and the Silhouettes in a "break dance" competition. Rather than fighting, the gangs are using the dance competition to settle a dispute between the two parties. Doris has trouble ridding herself of "Snake," a gang member who has a crush on her. Coco, inspired with Bruno's life out of school, has to decide whether or not to drop out with the chance to tour with a traveling act. Note: This was the final episode that Erica Gimpel (as Coco Hernandez), appeared in as a series regular, however her name remained in the opening credits until the end of the season. Guest starring Bill Forsythe (as Snake). Also starring Russ Marin (as Louie Bacca). Co-starring David Greenlee (as Dwight), Michael DeLorenzo (as Michael), and Thomas Guzman-Sanchez (as Tino). Featuring Kelly Minter (as Angel Rodriguez), Frances Lee Morgan (as Liz), Steven Daniells Silva (as Silhouette), and Ice-T (as One of the 'Enforcers') [Uncredited].
| 48 | 9 | "Secrets" | Victor French | Parke Perine | January 7, 1984 |
When Dwight shows up to school with severe bruises on his body, Danny along with the rest of the school believe he is a victim of bullying. Danny appoints himself as Dwight's bodyguard against his wishes. Against her requests, Larry Marshall, an undercover cop, joins Lydia's dance class in an attempt to bring rumored drug trafficking within the school to a halt. Guest starring Shawn Stevens (as Larry), Nancy Cartwright (as Muffin), Mariclare Costello (as Mrs. Mendenhall), and James Callahan (as Doctor). Also starring Mills Watson (as Richard Mendenhall). Co-starring David Greenlee (as Dwight), Michael DeLorenzo (as Michael), and Ann Nelson (as Mrs. Berg).
| 49 | 10 | "Equals" | Michael Peters | Story by : Paul Boorstin, Sharon Boorstin & Lee H. Grant; Teleplay by : Lee H. Grant | January 14, 1984 |
Holly falls for Billy Christiansen, a new piano player who plays at "Caruso's." Upon getting ready to ask him out, she learns that he is a paraplegic who uses a wheelchair. Mr. Morloch tries to get Miss Grant to give his friend and former baseball star, "Lefty" Rogers (played by famed R&B Singer Peabo Bryson) in pursuit of a career in recording jingles for television commercials, singing and dancing lessons. Special Guest Star Peabo Bryson (as Lefty Carl Rogers). Guest starring Merritt Butrick (as Billy) and Dave Shelley (as Caruso). Featuring Gloria Charles (as Waitress) and Ann Nelson (as Mrs. Berg).
| 50 | 11 | "Fame Looks At Music '83" | Walter C. Miller | Ken Ehrlich | January 28, 1984 |
This special features the cast of "Fame," billed as "The Kids from Fame," along with the season three regular dancers in their first concert in the U.S. which takes a look back at popular music in the year 1983 (See 1983 in music). The concert took place on December 27, 1983 at the Santa Monica Civic Auditorium in Santa Monica, California before a live capacity audience. Among other musical performances, this particular episode featured a medley of songs from motion pictures and a special tribute to Michael Jackson. (Guest starring is Irene Cara, who sang "Fame" - the song an Academy Award winner - originally for the film of the same title which she also starred in as the original Coco). Starring Debbie Allen, Cynthia Gibb, Billy Hufsey, Carlo Imperato, Valerie Landsburg, and Gene Anthony Ray. Guest starring Irene Cara (as Herself).
| 51 | 12 | "Appearances" | William F. Claxton | Ali Marie Matheson & Kerry Ehrin | February 4, 1984 |
While working on a scene together, Holly and Christopher are prompted by their friends to try going out with each other. Danny falls for Marya, a student hoping to be admitted into the School of the Arts. When they discover that her dancing ability - or lack thereof, isn't enough to get her in, Danny pursues Miss Grant asking her to "pull some strings." Guest starring Claudia Wells (as Marya). Co-starring Bronwyn Thomas (as Michelle) and Seth Kaufman (as Waiter).
| 52 | 13 | "Bottle of Blues" | Robert Scheerer | Adam Rodman | February 11, 1984 |
When Doris' ex-boyfriend, Sandy Gordon, who was expelled for his drinking problem, is allowed readmission into the School of the Arts, she's overjoyed until she learns that he was hiding his continuing battle with alcoholism from her. Doris enlists her friends to help him beat his addiction. Guest starring Scott Colomby (as Sandy Gordon) and Ann Nelson (as Mrs. Berg).
| 53 | 14 | "Lisa's Song" | Debbie Allen | Karen Davis | February 18, 1984 |
When Doris tries to get her classmates to do a production of the reputedly haunted play, "The Gypsy Queen," she and Miss Grant are convinced that they have seen a ghost. While trying to obtain a better understanding of the occult, they discover that Mrs. Berg is a "spirit medium." Co-starring Christie Houser (as Lisa Danielle), Bronwyn Thomas (as Michelle), Seth Kaufman (as Rick the Waiter), and Ann Nelson (as Mrs. Berg).
| 54 | 15 | "A Way of Winning" | Robert Scheerer | Douglas Brooks West & Carole Coates | February 26, 1984 |
When Mr. Morloch learns about Leroy's previous track success, he tries to persuade him to go for a college track scholarship much to Lydia's dismay. While doing character research for a role as an elderly woman in her acting class, Doris finds an older man falling for her. Guest starring Morgan Stevens (as David Reardon), Lew Ayres (as Bert Kline), Michael Bell (as Hoskins), and Dave Shelley (as Don Caruso). Co-starring Jim Bridges (as Eddie).
| 55 | 16 | "Stages" | Richard Kinon | Billy Field | March 4, 1984 |
When Holly's mother, Suzie (played by guest star, Donna McKechnie) moves in with her, she finds that her mother is getting in the way of things. When Danny tries to hypnotize Leroy and Christopher, Mr. Morloch is inadvertently put under a post-hypnotic spell and Mrs. Sherwood wants to have some fun with it. Guest starring Donna McKechnie (as Susan Laird), Johnny Haymer (as Gianni), and Dave Shelley (as Don Caruso). Co-starring David Greenlee (as Dwight), Charlie Brill (as Jennings), Bronwyn Thomas (as Michelle), Derrick Brice (as Dancer), and Ann Nelson (as Mrs. Berg).
| 56 | 17 | "Sheer Will" | Robert Scheerer | Christopher Beaumont | March 18, 1984 |
When the kids discover that Danny has leucemia, Doris makes her biggest effort to convince Danny to listen to his doctor and fight the disease. Lydia decides to show the kids how to make a non-dancer look good in a dance number. Guest starring Megan Daniels (as Teenager), Fionnula Flanagan (as Dr. Pettibon), and Andy Romano (as Mr. Amatullo)
| 57 | 18 | "Catch a Falling Star" | Richard Kinon | Morgan Stevens | March 25, 1984 |
A former night club performer, and close friend to Leroy's uncle, Eddie Macon (played by guest star, George Kirby), is discovered by Ms. Sherwood hiding out in a closet in her classroom. Now homeless and alcohol dependent, Leroy and Mr. Reardon attempt to help him while casting him in a school production. Holly helps Doris with a make-up in an attempt to impress a boy that she's interested in. Guest starring George Kirby (as Eddie Macon) and Morgan Stevens (as David Reardon). Co-starring David Greenlee (as Dwight), Steffen Zacharias (as Harland), Bronwyn Thomas (as Michelle), and Richard Kantor (as Tony).
| 58 | 19 | "A Friend in Need" | David W. Hahn | Parke Perine | April 1, 1984 |
Blind substitute teacher, Jim Hamilton (Played by guest star, Tom Sullivan), returns to the School of the Arts. This time he's returning as the director for a school production. He expresses a romantic interest in Lydia. After she turns down his advances, Jim backs out of the production leaving Lydia to believe that it's because of her. Morloch takes over as the director for the production while Lydia and the kids attempt to get the real reason for Jim's resignation. Special Guest Star Tom Sullivan (as Jim Hamilton). Guest starring Dave Shelley (as Don Caruso). Co-starring John Fragnoli (as Allan Kerk), Michael DeLorenzo (as Michael) and Ann Nelson (as Mrs. Berg). Featuring Patti Lotz (as Marsha Wood) and Cynthia Pingree (as Other Woman).
| 59 | 20 | "The Deal" | Robert Thompson | Story by : Ray Simmons & Paul Rodriguez; Teleplay by : Paul Rodriguez | April 29, 1984 |
When Caruso's landlord, Sal Di Angelo, threatens to turn the coffee house into a parking lot, Bruno proposes that he keep the coffee house open if he arranges an admission to the School of the Arts for Sal's friend, a young opera singer named Alisha Morgan. Mrs. Berg's husband is suspicious of Mrs. Berg and Mr. Shororfsky's relationship. (Phoebe Yadon-Lewis is introduced in her role of Alisha Morgan). Introducing Phoebe Yadon-Lewis (Alicia Morgan). Guest starring Lawrence Tierney (as Mr. Berg), Dave Shelley (as Don Caruso) and William Prince (as Sal Di Angelo). Co-starring David Greenlee (as Dwight), John Bloom (as Big Marco), Richard Noyce (as The Tall Man), Ed Berke (as Maury), and Ann Nelson (as Mrs. Berg). Featuring Deane Hagen (as Drummer).
| 60 | 21 | "Home Again" | Robert Scheerer | Story by : Melissa Manchester, Kevin DeRemer & Christopher Beaumont; Teleplay by : Christopher Beaumont | May 6, 1984 |
Miss Daniels, a former singer who stopped singing because of stage fright, fills in for Ms. Sherwood as an English substitute. Miss Daniels tries to keep her past a secret, but Dwight remembers her from his childhood and gets Mr. Shorofsky's to help her overcome her fear. (Melissa Manchester, Grammy Award recipient for Best Female Vocalist, plays Miss Daniels in her dramatic television debut. She performs two of her hits: "City Nights" from her 1983 album "Emergency" and "Better Days" from her 1976 album "Better Days & Happy Endings.") Special Guest Star Melissa Manchester (as Miss Denora 'Dene' Griffin Daniels). Co-starring David Greenlee (as Dwight), Michael DeLorenzo (as Michael), and Ann Nelson (as Mrs. Berg). Featuring Seth Kaufman (as Waiter).
| 61 | 22 | "Signs" | William F. Claxton | Valerie Landsburg and Michael A. Hoey | May 13, 1984 |
While showing off for a girl in class, Christopher back flips and hits his head, resulting in severe hearing loss. He is forced to transfer to a school for deaf students. Christopher refuses help from his old friends but Theresa, a friend from his new school, helps him accept some help from a friend. Lydia and Shorofsky try mixing singers and dancers in the same production. Also starring John Warner Williams (as Dr. Louis Henderson). Co-starring Michael DeLorenzo (as Michael), Bronwyn Thomas (as Michelle), Jackie Kinner (as Theresa), Mark Dana (as Mark), Julianne Gold (as Amy), Richard Kendall (as Teacher), and Ann Nelson (as Mrs. Berg). Featuring Kim Layton (as Kim).
| 62 | 23 | "Heritage" | Michael A. Hoey | Ken Ehrlich & Jay Grossman | May 20, 1984 |
Lydia is hired to teach dance to a basketball team. While getting involved with the star player, S.T. Gray, he refuses to come to her class. Lydia has to decide whether to report him. Mr. Shorofsky is disappointed with Doris rejecting her heritage when she turns down the opportunity to perform at a Holocaust Survivors benefit. (Norm Nixon, San Diego Clippers guard and Debbie Allen's real-life husband, guest stars as S.T. Gray.) Guest starring Norm Nixon (as S.T. Gray), Happy Hairston (as Kevin Taylor), Bob Seagren (as Coach Axler), Milton Selzer (as Leo Finkelstein), and Madlyn Rhue (as Mrs. Schwartz). Co-starring Michael DeLorenzo (as Michael), Jerry Chambers (as Player #1), Rick Barry (as Player #2), and Ann Nelson (as Mrs. Berg).
| 63 | 24 | "The Home Front" | William F. Claxton | Matt Geller | May 27, 1984 |
Christopher's home troubles are affecting his performance in school and he is unable to tell his friends about his problems or seek their help. With his father unemployed, Chris is forced to take on the role of a parent to his young siblings. When the students fall behind in their efforts in class, Mr. Morloch holds a class on a Saturday. Also starring Phoebe Yadon-Lewis (as Alicia Morgan). Guest starring Victor French (as Mr. Donlon). Co-starring David Greenlee (as Dwight), Michael DeLorenzo (as Michael), Bronwyn Thomas (as Michelle), Chris Beaumont (as Interviewer), and Ann Nelson (as Mrs. Berg). Featuring Ami Foster (as Tracy Donlon), Jerry Supiran (as Keith Donlon), and Eartha D. Robinson (as Eartha).

=== Season 4 (1984–85) ===
| No. overall | No. in season | Title | Directed by | Written by | Original release date |
|---|---|---|---|---|---|
| 64 | 1 | "Indian Summer" | William F. Claxton | Story by : Norman Chandler Fox; Teleplay by : Patricia Jones & Donald Reiker & Ira Steven Behr | September 29, 1984 |
It's the first week of school after the summer vacation has ended, love becomes a top priority at the School of the Arts. After they both share their grief over love gone wrong, Doris and Danny find consolation in each other and end up trying their hand at love together as a couple. Leroy is concerned as he discovers that his girlfriend may be pregnant. Holly has a crush on Mr. Reardon and Miss Sherwood starts dating a married man. (Janet Jackson, Nia Peeples, and Jesse Borrego join the cast in the roles of Cleo Hewitt, Nicole Chapman, and Jesse Velasquez). Guest starring Morgan Stevens (as David Reardon) and Ric Mancini (as Mr. Amatullo). Co-starring Jim Weston (as Mark Lewis) and Ann Nelson (as Mrs. Berg). Featuring Pinky (as Pinky).
| 65 | 2 | "Czech-Mate" | William F. Claxton | Story by : Sandy Fries; Teleplay by : Patricia Jones, Donald Reiker & Ira Steven Behr | October 6, 1984 |
The school presidential campaign has Danny and Doris butting heads. Campaign managers, Nicole and Jesse find that share a lot in common. Chris falls for Sasha, a student attending the School of the Arts as the daughter of a Czech diplomat who is on assignment for the U.N. Leroy finds that Cleo has a crush on him. Guest starring Daphne Ashbrook (as Sasha) and Sam Slovick (as Cassidy). Co-starring David Greenlee (as Dwight), Andrew J. Lederer (as Student), Adam Gregor (as Fydor), and Ann Nelson (as Mrs. Berg).
| 66 | 3 | "Spontaneous Combustion" | Michael Hoey | Story by : Patricia Jones & Donald Reiker; Teleplay by : Patricia Jones, Donald Reiker & Ira Steven Behr | October 13, 1984 |
While dancing in the hallway, the kids injure Miss Sherwood putting her in the hospital. Because of this, the Board of Education enforces a directive that states that dancing be prohibited in unspecified areas. With Mr. Morloch enforcing this new directive, the kids become determined to rule out the new rule. (This episode marks the first time Ann Nelson (as Mrs. Berg) is credited as a regular in the opening credits). Guest starring Sam Slovick (as Cassidy). Co-starring Ben Hammer (as Bill Drake) and Andrew J. Lederer (as Obnoxious Student).
| 67 | 4 | "I Never Danced for My Father" | Kevin Hooks | Joanne Pagliaro | October 20, 1984 |
After some reluctance to let his estranged father back into his life, Leroy discovers that his father really cares for him. Danny tries to convince his father that his aspirations to become a comedian aren't futile. Guest starring Alan Weeks (as Vernon Johnson) and Dick Miller (as Lou Mackie). Special Appearance by Louis Giambalvo (as Mr. Amatullo). Co-starring Betty Karlen (as Mrs. Amatullo).
| 68 | 5 | "The Heart of Rock 'N' Roll" | Walter C. Miller | Ken Ehrlich | October 27, 1984 |
Billed as "Kids from Fame," the cast from "Fame" perform in their first concert of the season alongside the season four regular dancers. This concert marks their second in the U.S. and their first with Janet Jackson, Jesse Borrego, and Nia Peeples in the cast. The theme of the concert is a tribute to the history of Rock 'N' Roll through the 50s and 60s including music from the Beatles to the Beach Boys. The concert took place at the Jones Beach Amphitheater on Long Island, New York. Notable performances include a Beatles medley by Gene Anthony Ray, Jesse Borrego, Billy Hufsey, and Carlo Imperato and an Elvis tribute by Billy Hufsey. Starring Jesse Borrego, Billy Hufsey, Carlo Imperato, Janet Jackson, and Valerie Landsburg, Nia Peeples, and Gene Anthony Ray.
| 69 | 6 | "Blizzard" | William F. Claxton | Paul Boorstin & Sharon Boorstin | November 3, 1984 |
A blizzard traps the staff and students in the school, provoking various problems. With the added problem with heat conservation due to a broken furnace, Doris fights with her mother for independence, a new relationship between Nicole and Jesse is challenged while the two are trapped in a classroom, and Leroy goes out into the blizzard to make an audition. While Mr. Morloch looks for a burglar in the school, he instead finds out that the burglar is actually a pregnant teenager. (This show was dedicated to the memory of Armando Huerta). Guest starring Madlyn Rhue (as Angela Schwartz) and Sally Klein (as Jamie Wagner).
| 70 | 7 | "The Monster That Devoured Las Vegas" | Allan Arkush | Ira Steven Behr | November 10, 1984 |
Disaster strikes at the School of the Arts. While trying to get the attention of a student, Mr. Morloch inadvertently upsets the cast with the scare of a hex. By whistling in the auditorium before the night of the performance, as depicted in a showbiz dictum, Mr. Morloch is held responsible for a series of disastrous events by the students and teachers in the cast. Guest-starring Sam Slovick (as Cassidy), Tuesday Knight (as Suzi Detroit), Lee Ving (as Fred), and Robert Romanus (as Milton "Psycho" Horowitz).
| 71 | 8 | "The Return of Doctor Scorpio" | William F. Claxton | Judy Merl & Paul Eric Myers | November 17, 1984 |
Trevor Kane, a School of the Arts Alumnus and acting has-been, returns to the School of the Arts to make an appearance in a play that Doris is directing. When he questions his abilities as an actor, the gang set out to assure him that he is adequate. Special guest star Anthony Newley (as Trevor Kane). Guest-starring Sam Slovick (as Cassidy). Co-starring David Westgor (as Michael Green), Bronwyn Thomas (as Michelle) and Tommy Rall (as Not Kane).
| 72 | 9 | "The Ballad of Ray Claxton" | Allan Arkush | Paul L. Ehrmann | November 24, 1984 |
After a morning news program airs an interview with Nicole, she receives a letter from a young man, Ray Claxton, who is serving time in a juvenile detention hall. Jesse is bothered by Nicole's closeness to Claxton as she decides to pay him regular visits at the prison, though she claims she's only visiting due to her admiration of his music and songwriting skills. Special Guest Star Gail Strickland (as Becky Guest). Guest starring Tom Schanley (as Ray Claxton).
| 73 | 10 | "Nothing Personal" | Debbie Allen | James Berg and Stan Zimmerman | December 1, 1984 |
After the lead of the freshman show is injured, Cleo fills in just six days before the show. But when Chris is unexpectedly assigned to write a review of her performance for the school newspaper by Miss Sherwood, he reluctantly singles out her lackluster performance. This leads to Cleo becoming so upset that she quits the school and Chris finds himself out in the cold with the rest of the kids and with Lydia. Meanwhile, Jesse and Nicole play cat and mouse with ads in the personals section after deciding to be just friends.
| 74 | 11 | "The Rivalry" | Allan Arkush | Billy Field | December 15, 1984 |
Holly's professional dancer mom, Suzi, pays her a visit and serves as a temporary teacher for Miss Grant who is out to audition for a role in an out-of-school production. A rivalry between Lydia and Suzi ensues which brings the two head-to-head in a dance off for a spot in the upcoming teachers' show. Guest starring Donna McKechnie (as Suzi Laird). Featuring Lawrence Lott (as Mr. Wendell) and Madelyn Cates (as Mrs. Lewandoski).
| 75 | 12 | "Dreams" | Ken Ehrlich | Norman Chandler Fox | January 5, 1985 |
Through being fined for performing on the street without a license, it is discovered that Jesse is an illegal alien. When the Immigration Department makes it clear that they intend to deport him, Doris commits to marrying him in an effort to keep him in the country. When that fails, Mr. Shorofsky makes the offer to adopt him. However, it is Nicole who may have the solution. Guest starring George Murdock (as Mr. Pulaski), Madlyn Rhue (as Angela Schwartz), John Milford (as Mr. Schwartz), and David Proval (as Doran). Featuring Lynn Seibel (as Griffith), Charles Walker (as Police Officer), and Harry Lewis (as Justice of the Peace).
| 76 | 13 | "Tomorrow's Children" | Debbie Allen | Patricia Jones & Donald Reiker | January 12, 1985 |
During Careers Day, guest speaker Sgt. Joe Garver, is invited to speak to the students about the military. With the intent to inspire the kids to consider careers in the military, Garver starts up an R.O.T.C. program in the school with the help of Mr. Morloch's support. Miss Sherwood runs a theme of 'poetry of the 1960s' while the kids plan to do a production of "Hair" as a benefit concert for the Nuclear Freeze campaign. (Joan Baez has a guest performance). Special Guest Star Joan Baez (as Herself). Guest Starring Richard Romanus (as Joe Garver), Janet Jackson (as Cleo Hewitt). Co-starring David Greenlee (as Dwight) and Conroy Gedeon (as Newsperson). Featuring Diane Racine (as Mrs. Gimble).
| 77 | 14 | "The Heart of Rock 'N' Roll II" | Walter C. Miller | Ken Ehrlich | January 26, 1985 |
This episode was the second half of the concert starring the cast of "Fame" and the season four regular dancers. Filmed at the Jones Beach Amphitheater on Long Island, New York, this episode included a tribute to Stevie Wonder featuring covers of his hits ranging from "Fingertips (Part 2)" to "Ribbon in the Sky." Janet performs her brothers' hit "I Want You Back," Nia Peeples covers Pat Benatar's "Fire and Ice," and Jesse Borrego takes on Prince's "When Doves Cry." Starring Jesse Borrego, Billy Hufsey, Carlo Imperato, Janet Jackson, and Valerie Landsburg, Nia Peeples, and Gene Anthony Ray.
| 78 | 15 | "Take My Wife... Please" | William F. Claxton | Michael McGreevey | February 2, 1985 |
Two love triangles develop at the School of the Arts: Cleo starts dating Danny in an attempt to make Leroy jealous. Meanwhile, when Christopher has a hard time with Shakespeare in drama class, his teacher, Trevor Kane's (played by Anthony Newley), appoints Christopher the acting partner of his ex-wife, actress Daphne Simone (played by Deborah Wakeham) – who is seeking Mr. Kane's coaching for a Broadway play. When Christopher develops feelings for Daphne, Mr. Kane learns that he too still has feelings for her. Special Guest Star Anthony Newley (as Trevor Kane). Guest starring Deborah Wakeham (as Daphne Simone) and Sam Slovick (as Cassidy).
| 79 | 16 | "Parent's Week" | Michael A. Hoey | Carol Gary | February 9, 1985 |
In the midst of Parent's Week, turmoil hovers over the kids. Danny has a hard time dealing with his parents' separation. Nicole's parents put pressure on her when she enters the New York Science Fair while Morloch encourages Christopher to hang out with Cassidy in an attempt to make him "normal." Guest starring Betty Karlen (as Mrs. Amatullo), Sam Slovick (as Cassidy), and Ernie Lively (as Bart Cassidy). Special Appearance by Louis Giambalvo (as Mr. Schwartz). Co-starring Jennifer Rhodes (as Joyce Chapman) and Irene Forrest (as Wendy Cassidy). Featuring Judith Jordan (as Josie).
| 80 | 17 | "Danny De Bergerac" | Arthur Allan Seidelman | Paul Wolff | February 16, 1985 |
When he does a re-write for a "street" version of "Cyrano De Bergerac," Christopher casts Nicole as Roxanne, Jesee as Christian, and Danny as Cyrano. Although Nicole is seeing Jesse, Danny has admitted that he has feelings for her. Mr. Morloch is reacquainted with an old college roommate whose wife he used to be with and may still have feelings for. Guest starring Scott Marlowe (as Bob Demeter), Jennifer Rhodes (as Joyce Chapman), and Marta Kristen (as Dede Callahan). Co-starring Ted Sorel (as Ted Chapman). Featuring Gus Corrado (as The Waiter).
| 81 | 18 | "Team Work" | Ira Steven Behr | Donald Reiker | February 23, 1985 |
When Christopher and Danny collaborate in a comedy act, Christopher is discovered and experiences fame. Along with the pros of fame, Chris becomes tainted when he abandons his partner and attempts to sabotage Leroy as he becomes competition. When Nicole moves in with Holly for a week, tension builds between the pair. Guest starring Vincent Baggetta (as Jimmy Brock) and Dick Miller (as Lou Mackie). Co-starring Lynnda Ferguson (as The Photographer) and Bronwyn Thomas (as Michelle). Featuring Doreen Andrade and Alexia Robinson (as The Back Up Girls), Carl Carlsson (as Paper Cutter), and Rough Cut.
| 82 | 19 | "Coco Returns" | Debbie Allen | Carol Mendelsohn | March 2, 1985 |
After her turn as professional on Broadway, Coco Hernandez returns to get her diploma at the School of the Arts. Nathan Adler (Played by Milton Berle), a famous retired director, is chosen to direct a school production and casts Coco as the lead in the play. This poses a clash between director and lead actress. Guest starring Erica Gimpel (as Coco Hernandez). Special Guest Star Milton Berle (as Nathan Adler). Featuring Francesca P. Roberts (as The Nurse).
| 83 | 20 | "Wishes" | Michael A. Hoey | Michael McGreevey | March 30, 1985 |
Mr. Morloch temporarily makes Miss Sherwood Vice Principal when he has to leave the school to attend a conference for school administrators. She discovers the challenges of being an administrator. In an attempt to make some money to pay for his rent, Leroy signs up for a television game show and as a result finds himself in a bit of trouble. Doris starts dating a guy that she thinks is perfect. Guest starring Yves André Martin (as David Anderson), Stuart Pankin (as Harry Burke), and Ismael 'East' Carlo (as Perez). Co-starring Paul Eiding (as Edgar Popjoy). Featuring Nat Bernstein (as Ira).
| 84 | 21 | "Who's Afraid of the Big Bad Wolf?" | Lorraine S. Ferrara | Carol Gary | April 6, 1985 |
When Doris is mugged on her way to her grandmother's house, she finds that the experience induced trauma her in many aspects of her life. Having a crush on Holly, Dwight learns to overcome his shyness around her as the two become close friends. Guest starring Madlyn Rhue (as Angela Schwartz) and Frances Bay (as Grandma George). Co-starring David Greenlee (as Dwight) and Jon Jacobs (as Policeman). Featuring Hayley Taylor-Block (as The Little Girl) and Tony Marz (as The Little Boy).
| 85 | 22 | "Reflections" | Valerie Landsburg McVay | Patricia Jones & Donald Reiker | May 4, 1985 |
It's the end of the year and Prom is near. Doris has decided on a Hawaiian theme for the Prom to the disapproval of the rest of the kids. With her parents' recent divorce, Holly deals with the stresses of her failed home life by starving herself. A recovering anorexic herself, Miss Grant, recognizing the signs, offers some helpful words of advice to which Holly ignores. It may take severe consequences to expose her to the dangers of anorexia. Guest starring Donna McKechnie (as Suzi Laird), Barry Jenner (as Jim Laird), and Gigi Vorgan (as Tina). Co-starring Shirley Prestia (as The Nurse). Note: Valerie Landsburg is the only cast member other than Debbie Allen to direct an episode of the series.
| 86 | 23 | "Who Am I, Really?" | Ray Danton | Michael McGreevey | May 11, 1985 |
The School of the Arts welcomes Diane, a visiting photographer who has arrived under the pretense of working on a project involving the kids. Nicole has always known that she was adopted and through a sense of connection that she feels with Diane, Nicole discovers that Diane is in fact her biological mother. Diane and Nicole begin hanging out with each other much to the dismay of Nicole's parents and Jesse. Expected to deliver his annual State of the School address, Mr. Morloch enlists an unwilling Chris, when he loses his voice, to present his speech for him. Guest starring Julie Carmen (as Diane Petit) and Jennifer Rhodes (as Joyce Chapman). Co-starring Ted Sorel (as Ted Chapman).
| 87 | 24 | "The Ol' Ball Game" | Donald Reiker | Ira Steven Behr | May 18, 1985 |
When Danny is challenged by an old rival - and his school, Zackary Taylor High - to a softball game against his school, Danny accepts the challenge, although worried about putting the team together. At first, things go well, but when the girls decide to play and beat the boys during their first practice, the humiliated team backs down leaving the girls to take the place of the boys on Danny's team. Guest starring Rob Morrow (as Joey Laurenzano), Dick Miller (as Lou Mackie), and Burke Byrnes (as Buzzy Fentin). Co-starring David Greenlee (as Dwight). Featuring Paul La Greca (as Irving Abromowitz).
| 88 | 25 | "School is Out" | Ken Ehrlich | Story by : Ken Ehrlich; Teleplay by : Patricia Jones and Donald Reiker | May 25, 1985 |
With summer approaching quickly, the kids are feeling down as they find that they'll miss the school and each other during their summer holiday. This especially holds true for Cleo who will be leaving the school as her family is set to move to California. Upon discovering the news of her departure, Cleo, Jesse, and Nicole sit and reminisce about the memories created at the School of the Arts the previous year. Note: Janet Jackson makes her final appearance as Cleo Hewitt in this episode. Although not featured in this episode but still in the opening credits, it also marks Valerie Landsburg's final episode as Doris Schwartz as an official cast member.

=== Season 5 (1985–86) ===
| No. overall | No. in season | Title | Directed by | Written by | Original release date |
|---|---|---|---|---|---|
| 89 | 1 | "A Place to Belong" | Ray Danton | Paul Boorstin & Sharon Boorstin | October 12, 1985 |
As the School of the Arts opens up again for the new school year, things are stirred up, yet again. New student, Dusty Tyler (played by Loretta Chandler), finds herself feeling out of place. Similarly, veteran and recent graduate Leroy Johnson - who has just been asked to be Miss Grant's assistance - feels he doesn't belong as he's no longer a student and not quite a teacher. He's further upset when he's chosen to choose someone among his friends to play the lead role in the school's new production. After mocking Dusty for reading the lines of Romeo from "Romeo and Juliet," Mrs. Persky gives Danny and Christopher the task of playing the role of two sisters in full costume. (Joining the cast this season is Loretta Chandler (as Dusty Tyler). Guest starring Randee Heller (as Peggy Persky). Featuring Tom McDermott (as The Stage Manager).
| 90 | 2 | "Leroy and the Kid" | Allan Arkush | Abe Polsky | October 19, 1985 |
With an unexpected visit from his feisty, eight-year-old, streetwise niece, Tina, Leroy reluctantly allows her to stay with him at his apartment while her father, Leroy's brother, Lamar, has taken off without a trace. With Miss Grant and Mr. Shorofsky trying to put together a show with the help of a backer, Stanley Beckerman, and with Tina's behaviour getting her suspended from school, Leroy is forced to take her to school with him where Jim Parker, Beckerman's assistant, decides that without Tina there will be no show. With Tina unenthused with the idea of being featured in the show to help her uncle out, she uses the desperation of the faculty to bribe Leroy, Miss Grant, and Mr. Shorofsky, though her reluctance to help Leroy out may put the show at risk. Danny finds out that he can't get actors’ equity because there is already a Danny Amatullo registered. Christopher struggles to understand his role as Hamlet. Special Guest Appearance by John Carradine (as Danny Amatullo). Guest starring Jack Carter (as Stanley Beckerman), Caryn Ward (as Tina), and Todd Susman (as Jim Parker).
| 91 | 3 | "Bronco Bob Rides Again" | Allan Arkush | Michael McGreevey | October 26, 1985 |
While in Central Park, Danny encounters his favourite old western actor Bronco Bob and his partner in the classic films, Prince the Miracle Horse and is star struck. Danny eventually finds that his hero is down on his luck and depends on the sale of pictures of him and Prince to make a living. Danny is concerned and determined to help. Things get worse when an old acting rival, Myron "Black Bart" Leach, spitefully tries to repossess Prince with the pretext that Bronco has ceased payment on the horse. In an attempt to pay for the horse and restore Bronco's pride, Danny involves the School of the Arts in the production of a show to raise the funds. This, however, may not solve the dispute over Prince's rightful ownership. Guest starring Myron Healey (as Bronco Bob), Leo Gordon (as Myron Leach), and Dick Miller (as Lou Mackie). Co-starring David Greenlee (as Dwight). Featuring John Svar (as Timmons).
| 92 | 4 | "Selling Out" | Ray Danton | Joanne Pagliaro | November 2, 1985 |
With the emergence of a prestigious song-writing contest, the students at the School of the Arts are focused on creating the winning song for the chance at indispensable exposure and potential superstardom. With inspiration from his grandfather's teachings to him as a child in his native Mexico, Jesse wins the competition with a heart-felt original piece. Though initially excited, Jesse discovers a popular downside to the entertainment business when music business big shots, Alan Stewart and Mitch Randall, decide to change many of Jesse's original ideas. Mr. Shorofsky struggles with "selling out" as well when he auditions a mediocre violin enthusiast and former football jock Bradley Elliot, Jr., whose father is willing to make a generous donation that could reform many budget-related deficiencies at the school. Guest starring Christian Clemenson (as Alan Stewart), Robert Fieldsteel (as Mitch Randall), and Joshua Cadman (as Bradley Elliot Jr.). Featuring Natividad Vacio ( Jesse's Grandfather) and Jeannie Marie Austin (as The Stage Manager).
| 93 | 5 | "White Light" | Allan Arkush | Ira Steven Behr | November 9, 1985 |
When Christopher falls for Julie Chandler, a beautiful, talented student, the two feel like finding each other was the best thing that's happened for either of them. After a noticeable decline in Julie's performance at school, Chris discovers that Julie is secretly a coke addict. Although he insists she quit, she tells him she needs a boost to better her academia and he helps her by making deals with her supplier Hunk Pepitone. When Chris attempts to put an end to her abuse, Julie refuses to end her drug use. In a battle between her and the drug, the drug may come out on top. After his parents' separation, Danny feels uneasy when his mother, Gina Amatullo, starts dating Lou Mackie. Guest starring Wendy Smith Howard (as Julia Chandler), Betty Karlen (as Gina Amatullo), Dick Miller (as Lou Mackie), and David Proval (as Hunk Pepitone).
| 94 | 6 | "Savage Streets" | Nicholas Sgarro | Carol Gray | November 16, 1985 |
There is an eruption of gang warfare in Jesse's barrio (neighborhood) and when local gang rivals, The Ravens and The Skulls rehash an old feud with the return of The Skulls' tough leader, Popeye, The Ravens' leader, George, uses threats to make Jesse join their gang. Nicole, having "visions," senses danger and tries to dissuade Jesse but her warnings go ignored. When Popeye kills Jesse's good friend, Hector, Jesse joins the gang to avenge Hector's murder. One of the Ravens and the younger brother of George, Luis, befriends Mr. Shorofsky when he expresses an interest in the trumpet. Guest Starring Esai Morales (as George) and Abel Franco (as Hector). Featuring Eddie Castrodad (as Luis), Featuring Rick Elias (as Popeye), and Leo Garcia (as Raphael).
| 95 | 7 | "His Majesty Donlon" | Michael A. Hoey | Ira Steven Behr | November 23, 1985 |
Prince Frederic "Freddy" (Played by Billy Hufsey in addition to his regular role as Christopher) of Vatonia has arrived in New York City to make a speech for an important United Nations' event. Upon learning that his life is being threatened and upon the discovery of a perfect lookalike Christopher, by his assistant William, an arrangement is made for the two to switch identities for 48 hours. Christopher is willing to go along with the charade until he is attacked by two gunmen, disguised as Freddy's guards, attempting to kill the prince. (Nia Peeples also plays double roles as she plays her regular character Nicole and the prince's fiancé Maryanne of Gimblestien). Guest starring Henry Beckman (as William Rosenkrantz). Co-starring David Greenlee (as Dwight), Adam Gregor (as Rolf), and John Lykes (as Ivor).
| 96 | 8 | "Broadway Danny Amatullo" | Lawrence Dobkin | Frank South | November 30, 1985 |
Upon learning that a noteworthy agent, Moe Starkey, attends a local restaurant regularly, the kids head to the restaurant to get his attention headed by Danny disguised as a waiter. After the gang performs Prince's "Baby, I'm a Star," Moe decides that Danny would make a great agent despite Danny's lifelong aspiration to be an actor. Danny chooses to work for Moe as an agent and because of this strays from his acting duties in the school's latest production. Guest starring Randee Heller (as Peggy Persky), Nancy Lenehan (as Brenda Haskell), Dick Miller (as Lou Mackie), Jack Kehoe (as Moe Starkey), and Carl Carlsson (as Ernie Shank). Featuring John Hallow (as The Maitre'D).
| 97 | 9 | "Ebenezer Morloch" | Nicholas Sgarro | Robert Caplain | December 13, 1985 |
With Mr. Morloch's usually strict nature, during the Christmas holiday, his enforcement of school board regulations has everyone thinking of him as a "Scrooge." On the eve of Christmas, while working on the school's budget, Mr. Morloch falls asleep in his office where he dreams he is visited by the Ghost of Christmas Past, the Ghost of Christmas Present and the Ghost of Christmas Yet To Come who come to show him the importance of Christmas cheer. When he awakes, Mr. Morloch has clearly had a change of heart and embraces the holiday spirit. (This episode marks Ken Swofford's final appearance as Quentin Morloch) Guest Starring Isabelle Walker (as Francine). Co-starring David Greenlee (as Dwight).
| 98 | 10 | "Choices" | Donald Reiker | Patricia Jones & Donald Reiker | January 4, 1986 |
It's time for mid-year auditions and with the arrival of the new principal, Bob Dyrenforth (Played by Graham Jarvis), we learn that Mr. Morloch has left the school to coach a semi-pro ball team in Buffalo. Holly reveals that she's leaving school because she's been offered a role on a soap opera that will be filmed in Hollywood. Nicole is particularly upset by Holly's departure. When Holly suggests that Nicole go to auditions like she did, Nicole does just that and gets a small role in a Broadway show. When Mr. Dyrenforth unknowingly receives tickets to the same show, he discovers that Nicole is breaking an important school rule and he forces her to choose between attending the school or doing the show. Auditioning dance hopeful, Henry Lee, tries to use his neighborhood connection with Leroy to get into the school with mediocre talent. (This episode marks Cynthia Gibb's final series regular appearance as Holly Laird while Carrie Hamilton, Page Hannah, and Graham Jarvis officially join the cast as Reggie Higgins, Kate Riley, and Mr. Bob Dyrenforth). Guest starring Randee Heller (as Peggy Persky), Bruce Solomon (as Dr. Lindstrom), Don Cheadle (as Henry Lee), Alan Blumenfeld (as Charlie), and Kathy Graber (as Cathy). Featuring Larry Spinak (as Oedipus), Dan Schneider (as Cyrano), Pinky (as The Star Spangled Banner Student), Susan Moore (as The Flight Attendant), and Al Alu (as Mr. Hefferan).
| 99 | 11 | "The First Time" | Robert C. Thompson | Carol Mendelsohn | January 11, 1986 |
A series of unlucky events has Mr. Dyrenforth convinced that he is jinxed. Mrs. Berg and Miss Sherwood try to encourage him to remove himself from his pessimism. With evident tension between them, Nicole and Jesse re-examine a sensitive topic. Jesse is upset because Nicole is unwilling to have sex with him. The two decide to split up due to the disagreement on the topic and with a school dance approaching both need a date. Jesse goes with Kate and Nicole goes with Joe Douglas jealously erupts and causes a mild brawl which inadvertently leaves Mr. Dyrenforth soaked in punch. The two reconcile when Mr. Dyrenforth has a talk with Jesse about his jealous outburst and suggests that he wait for Nicole. The two make up and plan to spend the night together in a mountain cabin but a series of unfavorably events leaves the two with whiplash, making Nicole realize that it's best they wait. Danny and Reggie go to the dance together and find that they share a liking toward each other. Guest starring Will Bledsoe (as Joe Douglas) and Britt Leach (as The Innkeeper). Co-starring David Greenlee (as Dwight) and Melissa Tufeld (as Marianne).
| 100 | 12 | "A River to Cross" | Debbie Allen | Frank South | February 1, 1986 |
As preparations are being made for the school's production of Huck (leberry) Finn, Bobby cast as Jim, expresses an uneasiness with the content of the play and leaves the show after dealing with his suppressed frustration. Bobby gathers some of the kids and tries to have the play pulled, so concerned staff members, Miss Grant, Mrs. Sherwood, and Mr. Dyrenforth, have the opposing kids weigh out their differences. With the help of Leroy, Mr. Dyrenforth is determined to keep the play running. This starts a protest led by Bobby which creates a racial division in the school. The preparations for the play continue with a re-write courtesy of Mr. Dyrenforth but the censorship only creates more opposition as Leroy quits the play. When Mr. Dyrenforth bans the book, Miss Sherwood assigns Fahrenheit 451 to her class which gives Danny the idea to stage a book burning where Leroy helps him show the students the pointlessness of censorship. In a dream, Leroy encounters Jim, the slave from Huckleberry Finn who tells him that it's his job to, in his portrayal of Jim, show that his character isn't a fool. Special Appearance by Stan Shaw (as Jim) and Introducing Kenny Ransom (as Bobby Carter). Co-starring David Greenlee (as Dwight).
| 101 | 13 | "Such Good Friends" | Leo Penn | Carol Gary | February 8, 1986 |
Tina, Leroy's visiting niece, arrives at the School of the Arts to tell Leroy that she accidentally burned down his apartment while making Ravioli-Os. When Leroy learns of the damage Tina has caused, he seeks a temporary care giver for Tina. Mrs. Berg volunteers to put Tina up while Leroy stays in Miss Grant's spare room at her place. When Lydia is asked out to dinner by her old boyfriend, Carl, she asks Tina to tell Leroy to see if he can stay with a friend for the night. Tina instead tells Leroy that Miss Grant is expecting him to make dinner. Waking up the following morning, after being stood up, Leroy bumps into Carl in the kitchen. Leroy tries to reprimand Tina's actions when he learns of her scheme but Mrs. Berg saves her from the spanking. When Carl comes to the school to pick Lydia up for a date, Tina tells him that she went out with another man. After being stood up, Lydia and Leroy practice their dance when Leroy kisses her, at which Lydia is dismayed. Tina encourages Leroy to pursue Lydia in hopes of her adoption and a marriage between them while warding off Carl. Mr. Shorosky, who has been throwing his table tennis matches with his younger girlfriend, Liu Chin, tries to win her over by beating her while Miss Sherwood struggles to get her book, four years in the making, published. Guest starring Caryn Ward (as Tina) and Harrison Page (as Carl). Co-starring Takayo Fischer (as Liu Chin).
| 102 | 14 | "Holmes Sweet Holmes" | Allan Arkush | Carol Mendelsohn | February 15, 1986 |
After a rehearsal for the school's production of Sherlock Holmes, a pipe in the dressing room bursts. Mr. Dyrenforth makes arrangements for repair with Artie Horowitz, a contractor, who is also the father of Miltie Horowitz, but the board is unwilling to fund the expensive repair work and Mr. Dyrenforth is forced to close the school relocating the students to another building. Danny discovers that the broken pipe was sawed deliberately and figures that Ralph, the Janitor, is trying to sabotage the school in order to build a parking garage in its place. After seeing Miltie paying Ralph off, Danny is convinced of a father-son swindle. They get Page, Miltie's reluctant love interest to distract him while Danny checks out the janitor's space in the boiler room. After being knocked out by a fallen panel from the room, Danny discovers Ralph's dead body and is knocked out by someone who tries to escape. Danny wakes up convinced that he is Sherlock Holmes and sets out to solve the mystery. Just as Danny proves that Ralph is responsible for the entire ploy, Ralph hits him over the head... Guest starring Robert Costanzo (as Artie Horowitz/Ralph), Paul Bartel (as Claude Hunsicker), and Robert Romanus (as Miltie Horowitz). Featuring Thor Nielsen (as The Mysterious Stranger).
| 103 | 15 | "Double Exposure" | Bill Duke | Paul Boorstin & Sharon Boorstin | February 22, 1986 |
With auditions for a presentation of "Dr. Jekyll and Mr. Hyde" underway, competition heats up between Danny and Jesse for the lead role, but in order to make the cut for the play, all students have to pass the Biology midterm. The yearbook money goes missing twice and Dwight has enlisted his fellow hall monitors to get to the bottom of the theft. While developing shots that Reggie took for the yearbook, Nicole and Reggie discover Jesse going into an office cabinet where the now missing yearbook money was stored. When Nicole confronts him thinking he took the yearbook money, he admits that he took the answers to the test. He throws the answers away only to retrieve them from the trash later. He gets the part and all is well until Nicole discovers the answers in his jacket. After Danny discovers the truth about the test, he vows to make Jesse suffer. In his assertion, he discovers he's got his own case of a "Dr. Jekyll and Mr. Hyde" split personality. Co-starring David Greenlee (as Dwight).
| 104 | 16 | "The Inheritance" | Debbie Allen | Hollis Rich | March 1, 1986 |
Tina's father, Lamar returns but only to borrow money from Leroy under the pretense of establishing a life for Tina. Tina's nanny, Mrs. Castillo, dies and Tina is revealed to be the sole beneficiary in Mrs. Castillo's will. When Lamar learns of the $22,000 estate that has been passed on to his daughter, he returns for her offering to use the money to get him and his daughter a house. Leroy doesn't trust his brother to do right by Tina with the money and when Lamar's conscience gets to him, he opts to leave admitting that he only came for the money. Dwight is directing a play about the Dewey Decimal System in which his inspiration for the lead character's wife, Anna Dewey, is based on his love interest and former School of the Arts student Holly and his directorial vision and obsession is driving Kate, who's been cast as Anne Dewey, and the rest of the cast up the wall. (Cynthia Gibb makes a voice-over appearance as Holly over the phone). Guest starring Caryn Ward (as Tina), Al Ruscio (as Sergeant Levin), Lawrence Hilton-Jacobs (Lamar), and Lupe Ontiveros (as Mrs. Castillo). Co-starring David Greenlee (as Dwight). Featuring Tony Rader (as The Waiter).
| 105 | 17 | "The Comedian" | Reza Badiyi | Adam Leslie | March 22, 1986 |
Comedian Sandy Webb is running a comedy workshop at the School of the Arts where he encourages Danny and Chris to tell jokes that are personal. His advice proves to be fitting as their act becomes a hit at Lou Mackie's bowling alley. Danny is dumbfounded when he realizes that Sandy stole his act from him while on "The Phil Braverman Show." After making an indirect apology, he steals more of Danny's jokes on another show. The pair confronts him when he gets a gig at "The Funny Club" and he insists they forget the incident. Danny begins to take his anger out on his peers which prompts the break-up of Danny and Chris' act. Danny decides to change his major to music until while making his mother feel better about her pending divorce; he rediscovers why he wanted to do comedy in the first place. Reggie, a naturally funny person, is upset with the fact that she can't help being funny even when playing the serious role of Lady Macbeth. Instead of playing her role seriously, she plays her part with a comedic approach. Guest starring Sal Viscuso (as Sandy Webb), Betty Karlen (as Gina Amatullo), and Dick Miller (as Lou Mackie). Featuring Steve Susskind (as The Bowler), Kevin McDermott (as The Audience Member), and Ron Meyers (as The Juggler).
| 106 | 18 | "Stagefright" | Debbie Allen | Michael McGreevey | March 29, 1986 |
After jumping on stage early during a 1950s-style play, Chris develops severe stage fright. He keeps his problem a secret while pouring his heart out to his hero, Elvis (portrayed by Robert Firth), who only he sees. When Danny learns of his troubles, he tries to help Chris overcome his fear. Jesse attempts to beat the record for the longest tapping duration but he's got some competition with Dwight's cousins Leonard. Kate wants to transfer into Miss Turner's class because she can't take Miss Grant's rough teaching style. Guest starring Robert Firth (as Elvis) and Will Bledsoe (as Joe Douglas). Co-starring Larry Spinak (as Leonard Mendenhall). Featuring Bebe Neuwirth (as Phyllis Turner) and Joe Gieb (as Tap Dance Competitor).
| 107 | 19 | "Self Defense" | Allan Arkush | Marilyn Anderson & Renee Orin | April 5, 1986 |
When Mr. Dyrenforth arrives at school, he discovers the first of a series of vandalism attacks that are soon to plague the School of the Arts. Jesse gets angered when he learns that Nicole has a secret admirer who keeps sending her flowers. The destruction, orchestrated by two unknown vandals and the unwanted adoration of a secret admirer has Nicole shaken and after seeing Miss Grant show off her karate skills in a "trashy" film, Dusty, Kate, Reggie, and Nicole ask Miss Grant to teach them karate. While the damage to the school continues, the girls become focused on developing as martial artists in their newly established karate class led by Miss Grant. Following a night out with the girls at Lou's, Nicole is forced to walk home alone and upon presuming that she's being followed, only to learn that her soon-to-be attacker was an innocuous basketball-bouncing passerby, loses her confidence – that is until she and Dwight meet the vandals. Guest starring Dick Miller (as Lou Mackie) and Robert Romanus (as Miltie Horowitz). Co-starring David Greenlee (as Dwight) and Tony Monaco (as Dale). Featuring Michael Shaner (as Vandal #1) and Evan James Malmuth (as Vandal #2).
| 108 | 20 | "W.S.O.A." | Winslow Phelps | Patricia Jones & Donald Reiker | April 26, 1986 |
As a deejay for W.S.O.A., a radio station at the School of the Arts, Jesse handles many phone calls from listeners – most of which are somewhat trivial. One of his callers, Roberta, requests a song called "You Don't Know Me" daily to which he dismisses until she reveals that the request is being made to pacify her pending suicide. Ann Strong, a psychologist for the school board advises Jesse to continue talking to her to appease her depression by assuring her that her pain will pass. Jesse and Roberta arrange to meet, but under the condition that he arrive alone. After not showing up, the kids start a search for the girl in hopes to save her. When she finally calls she reveals that she's taken pills already, Jesse has one final chance to convince her to live. When Mr. Dyrenforth finds the kids' dressing too revealing, he calls on Dwight to enforce the new dress code. Guest starring Kathleen Wilhoite (as Roberta) and Jesse Welles (as Ann Strong). Co-starring David Greenlee (as Dwight). Featuring Sheri Allen (as The Girl) and Ric Cane (as The Waiter/Lt.).
| 109 | 21 | "Contacts" | Allan Arkush | Ira Stephen Behr | May 3, 1986 |
Christopher and Kate secretly start going out and with her encouragement, Christopher takes a job as a waiter in hopes of establishing contacts. Upon arriving to work for Laura, an agent, she mistakes him for an actor and has him read. His reading impresses her and she offers to set up an audition for him. After kissing Laura, Chris tells her that he and Kate aren't romantically involved. This puts their relationship in jeopardy. Leroy is hired to do choreography for Jack Goodman, a producer for a summer stock company, but when Jack revokes salary from Leroy and his friends Leroy turns down the job which upsets the gang. Guest starring Lenore Kasdorf (as Laura Mattingly) and H. Richard Greene (as Jack Goodman). Co-starring Brenda Bolte (as Nancy). Featuring Fred McGrath (as Charlie), John William Evans (as The Older Actor), and Shaun Earl (as Jason).
| 110 | 22 | "To Tilt at Windmills" | Donald Reiker | Patricia Jones & Donald Reiker | May 10, 1986 |
When Miss Sherwood is sent home with a cold, Mr. William Quigley substitutes to teach the class about Don Quixote. With the school in demand for supplies, among them textbooks that have been sitting in a warehouse for nine months, Mr. Quigley decides pick up the textbooks with Jesse's help. In an effort to revolt against the "Great Enemy," this enemy first being red jello, he initiates a protest and destruction of the mandatory I.Q. tests. When Mr. Dyrenforth questions the sanity of the substitute, he gets the board involved which has Mr. Quigley suspended. Upon learning of his suspension, Mr. Quigley's eccentricity propels him to make an unusual outburst which puts him in an asylum. Mr. Quigley consoled Dusty when she wasn't picked for a lead in a school play but after he's taken away, she believes that he filled her with false hope. It takes Jesse to make him and everyone else realize what he's done for the school. Guest starring Kevin McCarthy (as Mr. William Quigley). Co-starring David Greenlee (as Dwight), Tim Haldeman (as Swaboda), Corinne Carroll (as Margaret), Eric Poppick (as Gottlieb), Jon Jacobs (as Motorcycle Cop), and Julie Ariola (as Receptionist). Featuring The USC Trojan Marching Band (Un-credited).
| 111 | 23 | "Losin' It" | Michael Vejar | Melinda Bell | May 17, 1986 |
When Henry Lee returns, Leroy is convinced that Miss Grant is giving favors. While demonstrating a routine, Leroy seriously injures his knee. He goes through an operation and intense rehabilitation to restore his knee, but when he returns to teach dance, he hesitates fearing that he'll injure his knee again. Instead of dancing, Leroy lashes out at Henry. Lydia is determined to push Leroy back into dancing because she's convinced that he'll never dance again if doesn't face his fear. Reggie has a crush on Max but is scared stiff to speak to him even while on a date and incessantly seeks Kaye's company for comfort. Guest starring Dermot Mulroney (as Max) and Don Cheadle (as Henry Lee). Co-starring Conrad Bachmann (as Doctor Clay). Special Cameo Appearance by Russ Tamblyn (as The Choreographer). Featuring Hideo Ebara (as The Sushi Chef) and Primo López (as The Taxi Driver).
| 112 | 24 | "The Incident" | Win Phelps | Teleplay by : Michael McGreevey | May 24, 1986 |
Jesse is in the hospital unconscious with a concussion. The events leading up to Jesse's hospitalization are a mystery. What is known about the incident involves Mr. Torrence who was excited about putting on a play. Mr. Torrence is the prime suspect and admits to hitting Jesse. He expressed an interest in Nicole to play his lead, Lisa, after seeing her perform. Jesse became jealous thinking that something was going on between Nicole and Mr. Torrence, especially after Nicole received a bracelet from him. What is clear about the night of "the incident" starts with Jesse insisting that she return the bracelet. When Nicole refused he left only to do discover the two kissing when he returned. Somehow Jesse falls off of the stage and with conflicting accounts of what happened from Mr. Torrence, Nicole, Jesse - through Mrs. Berg who claims she's a medium, and Christopher, Mr. Dyrenforth, Miss Sherwood, and Christopher try to figure out what actually happened. This episode is inspired by the play Rashomon as well as the film directed by Akira Kurosawa. Guest starring Robin Thomas (as Mr. Torrence).

=== Season 6 (1986–87) ===
| No. overall | No. in season | Title | Directed by | Written by | Original release date |
|---|---|---|---|---|---|
| 113 | 1 | "Back to Something New" | Win Phelps | Ira Steven Behr | October 6, 1986 |
As with every new school year, a few changes have taken place at the commencement of the new year: Christopher has graduated and is moving on to an unknown future, Miss Sherwood has finally published her novel and has moved to Maine, Kate has transferred to a school in Boston, and Ian Ware, an English Rock 'N' Roll major, is the newest freshmen to join the rest of the gang. Most disturbingly, Mr. Shorofsky has returned from his summer vacation feeling it wasn't long enough effectively leaving him unenthused about returning to teach. Christopher gets employment as a commercial actor and gets a small place in hopes of making some money from his commercial work but when he is replaced by another actor, his confidence quickly diminishes. Giving up on his dreams, Chris lashes out at his friends when they offer him help. In an attempt to get Mr. Shorofsky's critique on his work, Jesse discovers a change in him. Likewise, Ian is puzzled when he realizes he's traveled 3000 miles to work with a professor who's on the brink of retirement. Lastly, in an odd attempt at self-discovery, Reggie dresses up as different characters each day depending on her feeling that day. (Michael Cerveris joins the cast this season as Ian Ware). Guest starring Dick Miller (as Lou Mackie). Co-starring Carolyn J. Silas (as Laura Mackie). Featuring Robert King (as The Commercial Director) & J. Michael Higgins (as The Commercial Actor).
| 114 | 2 | "The Last Dance" | Oz Scott | Susan Goldberg | October 13, 1986 |
When Christopher's cousin, Vince, puts him in charge of entertainment for his wedding, he recruits Jesse and Nicole to dance as a couple at the wedding. Feeling that things have changed between them, Nicole breaks up with Jesse. The two choose to fulfill their commitment and work on their dance for the wedding but despite their understanding, Jesse is persistent and wants to get back with her. When Leroy informs Nicole that Jesse offered to drop out for her they get back together but things aren't the same. Danny starts dating Jillian Becket, the daughter of police officer Becket, who just started attending the school but she feels crowded when her father and brothers Sean's and Patrick's protectiveness becomes overwhelming. (Elisa Heinsohn officially joins the cast this episode in the role of Jillian Becket). Guest star Sandy McPeak (as Officer Becket). Guest starring Dick Miller (as Lou Mackie). Special Cameo Appearance by Denny Dillon (as Corky, the Cashier). Co-starring Todd Jeffries (as Sean Becket), Trevor Henley (as Patrick Becket), Bill Applebaum (as Vince Donlon), and Carolyn J. Silas (as Laura Mackie). Featuring Paul Comi (as The Minister), Ernie Brown (as Gramps), Gillian Schreiber (as Audrey), and Randy Allaire (as The Student Singing Scales).
| 115 | 3 | "New Faces" | Win Phelps | Harry Longstreet & Renee Longstreet | October 20, 1986 |
Lydia is reacquainted with Paul Seeger, an old acting friend who is filming a small part in a movie being shot in the city. After discussing his talent and the fact that he's never satisfied with any job opportunity that he receives, Lydia gets Paul a job as an acting teacher at the School of the Arts. Upon arriving to teach at the school, Paul is extremely hard on Jesse and the other students, something that upsets the kids. Despite the students having a sudden change of heart and wanting him to stay, he decides to leave to read for a part. When Lydia discovers that Paul has turned down yet another role, she shows him that he's guilty of career sabotage. Mr. Dyrenforth appoints Danny to give Hannah Cooper, an eleven-year-old child prodigy, a tour of the school. They form a friendship but Hannah begins to feel like Danny just wants to show her off and she refuses to play for anyone. (Eric Pierpoint joins the cast as Paul Seger). Guest starring Tanya Fenmore (as Hannah Cooper). Co-starring Dennis Howard (as The Producer), Nancy Burnett (as The Casting Woman), and Carolyn J. Silas (as Laura Mackie). Featuring Tom Parsekian (as The Assistant Director), Brian J. Anderson (as The Production Assistant), Judi Goldhand (as The Wardrobe Woman), and David Breithbarth (as The Actor).
| 116 | 4 | "Judgement Day" | Oz Scott | Michael McGreevey | October 27, 1986 |
On the anniversary of Leroy's becoming a teacher at the School of the Arts, the students and faculty members throw him an anniversary party at Lou's. After a year of teaching, Leroy also experiences a major student-teacher conflict when after the results are posted for the casting of the school's latest musical, Susan is upset because she feels that Leroy picked Debby because she is Black. Based on this, Mr. Dyrenforth receives unsigned letters claiming that Leroy has discriminated against the white students in favour of the black students. Susan confronts Leroy and accuses him directly of prejudice and after performing for her student evaluation, Leroy questioning his initial decision. When Leroy doesn't budge, she convinces Danny, who she's dating, that Leroy is exercising favoritism. Feeling the plague of such hurtful accusations, Leroy loses his regard for Black pride and replaces Debby with Susan in the lead. Miss Grant, however, feels that Leroy has been pressured and encourages him to trust his instincts. Mr. Shorofsky is having trouble dealing with Ian's fascination with Rock 'N' Roll music and he gets Lou to try to stir his interest in classical music. Guest-starring Lycia Naff (as Susan Pareno), Michelle Whitney-Morrison (as Debby Reid), and Dick Miller (as Lou Mackie). Co-starring Carolyn J. Silas (as Laura Mackie).
| 117 | 5 | "All Talking, All Singing, All Dancing" | Win Phelps | Richard Manning & Hans Beimler | November 3, 1986 |
With the Kimble foundation awarding $20,000 to the winner of a competition between plays, Mr. Dyrenforth decides to fund Jesse's 30's-style musical called "Shining Lights." With a hard-working cast and crew and the proposed budget growing, Mr. Dyrenforth informs them that the school board will not approve the budget and thus cancels the show. The show is saved when Lou Mackie donates the funds necessary to produce the show. All is well during the dress rehearsal when suddenly Nicole comes down with laryngitis. In a final attempt to save the play, Jesse replaces Nicole with an apprehensive Jillian and includes the love song that Reggie and Ian have been working on in the play. Guest starring Robert Romanus (as Miltie Horowitz) and Dick Miller (as Lou Mackie).
| 118 | 6 | "Hold the Baby" | Oz Scott | Michael McGreevey & Ira Steven Behr | November 10, 1986 |
As Chris anticipates a successful audition, his sister Eve leaves her 9-month old son Spike with him when she has to leave suddenly to aid her injured husband. With his girlfriend Shelley leaving him, losing out on his audition, and being locked out of his apartment because of a "no-babies" policy, Chris learns the ups and downs of parenting especially when saddened by his sister's return. With Mrs. Berg off to attend her brother's 50th wedding anniversary, Mr. Dyrenforth is left to his own devices learns that her job is a lot harder than he anticipated. Nicole, Dusty, Reggie, and Jullian form a band, The Cuties, which Miltie appoints himself manager of despite the fact that the girls have already dismissed his services but disagreements between the girls make them realize the hardships of being in a band. Guest starring Robert Romanus (as Miltie Horowitz) and Dick Miller (as Lou Mackie). Special Cameo Appearance by Russ Tamblyn (as The Choreographer). Guest starring Deborah Geffner (as Eve), and Diana Barton (Shelley Dumbrowski). Co-starring Carolyn J. Silas (as Laura Mackie) and Randy Allaire (as Randy).
| 119 | 7 | "A Different Drummer" | Michael Switzer | Hollis Rich | November 17, 1986 |
When Reggie is asked to do a scene from a play for drama class, she decides to ease her boredom with something edgy but when she gives her book report of "The Old Man and the Sea" handing out fish sticks and holding a fish with a raincoat on, Mr. Dyrenforth puts an end to it. Dusty's dad, Reverend Tyler who is running a benefit for the homeless in New York City, comes to visit her from Denver, Colorado and is put off by the risqué behaviour and surroundings of the school. Inspired by the benefit Dusty and Reggie go out to meet the homeless. Jesse introduces them to Silvia, a professional beggar who helps at a shelter. With Nicole, Jullian, and Ian, they stage a demonstration, dressed as homeless people, outside the Guggenheim Museum and when she's caught without a permit, Reggie is arrested. Mr. Dyrenforth suspends Reggie when she stages a protest. With the loss of corporate support, the benefit is canceled and Reverend Tyler intends to bring Dusty back home with him. Guest starring Albert Hall (as Reverend Tyler) and Marilyn Chris (as Sylvia). Co-starring Carolyn Mignini (as Miss Elliot). Featuring L. Kenneth Richardson (as The Policeman).
| 120 | 8 | "Mr Wacky's World" | Win Phelps | Ira Steven Behr & Michael McGreevey | November 24, 1986 |
Danny's feeling inadequate as a performer as he finds very few roles coming in. While trying to get his own show on the Public-access television cable TV channel, Danny walks on to the set of the popular Public-access program "Mister Whacky's World" and gets cast on the show as Noodles. Danny becomes a local star and the show is set to go national but with Mr. Wacky expecting Danny to remain his stooge, Danny is a bit conflicted with signing the contract. Jesse asks Dusty to sing a song he wrote and while working together, he inadvertently gives Dusty the impression that he is romantically interested in her. She invites him to a U2 concert and on their way home, all is well but when he backs off from her while she attempts to kiss him, she gets hurt. Guest starring Gerrit Graham (as Mr. Wacky), Dick Miller (as Lou Mackie). Co-starring Carolyn J. Silas (as Laura Mackie). Featuring Randy Bertish (as The Boy Student) and Oliver Givens (as Oliver The Prop Man).
| 121 | 9 | "All I Want for Christmas" | Alan Myerson | Robert Caplain | December 8, 1986 |
Leroy is studying for a biology mid-term while maintaining his teaching duties. Tina pays Leroy a surprise visit for Christmas when her dad goes out of town. Leroy is excited to spend Christmas with Tina but she feels that Christmas is a joke. Determined to prove her wrong, Leroy plans to buy her a $300 doll house that she's expressed an interest in. On his way to buy the dollhouse, Leroy is pick-pocketed. Unable to receive an advance from the board, Leroy takes up a job doing extra chores for Lou, and pawns his things. While trying so hard to get Tina want she wants, Leroy ends up spending no time with her and she is unimpressed with the material things that he worked so hard to get her. Mr. Shorofsky is hospitalized for Christmas when he finally decides to have his tonsils removed. He is put in room with two other kids Timmy and Matthew, who think he's Santa Claus, when a hot-shot producer steals his room. Jesse and Ian stage a surprise performance in hopes of getting the producer's attention. Guest starring Caryn Ward (as Tina), Zachary Bostrom (as Timmy), Elden Ratliff (as Matthew), Dick Miller (as Lou Mackie), Tony DiBenedetto (as Mr. Quimby), and John Ingle (as The Man In Hospital Suite 2B). Co-starring Carolyn J. Silas (as Laura Mackie) and Myrna White (as The Nurse). Featuring Jaclyn Bernstein (as The Older Youngster), Carl Bressler (as The Pickpocket), and Garette Ratliff (as Youngster #1).
| 122 | 10 | "Fame and Fortune" | Michael Switzer | Robert Caplain | December 29, 1986 |
As a disk jockey for the school's radio show and a big fan of 60s rock diva Frannie Fortune, Nicole makes it a priority to play her idol's records frequently. While paying Nicole a visit at the school, Frannie is impressed by her talent and invites her to sing back-up for her during a demo recording session for a song titled "Damaged." With Frannie's diva behaviour ruining the session, the producer expressing an interest in Nicole's voice, gives her the song instead. Upon learning of her replacement, Frannie is upset with Nicole stating that "what goes around comes around." After revealing that he hasn't had a date in months, Mr. Dyrenforth inspires Jesse, Danny, and Leroy to give his love life a boost. Unbeknownst to their plans, he's baffled to find his picture plastered on the side of a construction site and more so when he learns that women have shown an interest in him. Note: Nia Peeples makes her final appearance as Nicole Chapman in this episode. Guest starring Bonnie Bramlett (as Frannie Fortune). Co-starring Jim Piddock (as The Record Producer), Frederic Tucker (as The Recording Engineer), and Patricia Lee Willson (as Ellen). Featuring Randy Allaire (as Randy) and Shaun Earl (as Shaun).
| 123 | 11 | "Go Softly Into Morning" | Win Phelps | Renee Schonfeld Longstreet | January 5, 1987 |
After an eventful party involving plenty of alcohol, Miss Grant is frustrated when Danny and Nicole don't show up for an important rehearsal. That frustration turns to shock when it is revealed that Nicole was killed while she and Danny were being driven by a drunken Mickey Garth. While her friends from school and from Lou's are hit with the news, they all have a difficult time dealing with Nicole's death and an even harder time forgiving Mickey. Clearly suffering the most is Jesse and when he learns that Mickey will probably be charged only with involuntary manslaughter receiving only probation, he vows to personally kill Mickey. Feeling that everyone hates him but unaware of Jesse's intent, Mickey hides and leads a climatic cat and mouse chase. Guest starring Sean Gregory Sullivan (as Mickey Garth), Dick Miller (as Lou Mackie), Betty Karlen (as Gina Amatullo), Willard E. Pugh (as Mike Lifton), Will MacMillian (as Kenneth Garth), and Phil Peters (as Detective Murray). Co-starring Carolyn J. Silas (as Laura Mackie) and Randy Allaire (as Vince). Featuring Laura Feder (as The Ballerina), Lance Sloane (as Randy), and Jeanette O'Connor (as The Nurse).
| 124 | 12 | "Love Kittens Go to High School" | Luis Soto | Susan Goldberg | January 26, 1987 |
Film director Jeff Stave has convinced the school board to allow him to shoot his new movie "Love Kittens Go to High School" at the School of the Arts. Jillian is given the task of student assistant to Mr. Stave but she finds him obnoxious and arrogant. She is particularly annoyed when she finds him picking on her while on the job and as he uses her for an acting demonstration in her drama class where he is guest teacher. She slowly realizes their mutual infatuation for each other but after reality sets in, she learns that they are from two different worlds. After hostile beginnings, Maxie Sharp, a sixteen-year-old actress playing the lead role in the movie, develops a friendship with Jesse. After spending time with him and envying his normal life, she is inspired to enroll at the School of the Arts as a full-time student. With Shaun choreographing the final dance scene, the kids get to dance in the film's final scene. Mr. Stave asks Mr. Dyrenforth to play the principal in the film. Guest starring Olivia Barash (as Maxie Sharp), John Putch (as Jeff Stave), Jim Doughan (as The Assistant Director), and Bill Kalmenson (as The Cameraman). Featuring Shaun Earl (as Earl Derringer), Robert Neary (as Football Player), and Randy Allaire (as Vince).
| 125 | 13 | "The Crimson Blade" | Debbie Allen | Richard Manning & Hans Beimler | February 2, 1987 |
Jesse is playing the title character in the school's production of "The Crimson Blade" while Miltie is playing the wicked governor. Miltie shows an interest in Maxie but she is dating Doug, a hall monitor and after seeing the special treatment that Jesse is getting for playing the hero, Miltie is inspired to be a real-life hero dressed as the Crimson Blade; saving Maxie when Doug refuses to leave her alone when she rejects his advances, helping Ian and Jullian out of an unfair write-up by Doug, and shredding his innumerable citations. With all fingers pointing at Jesse, Doug, Maxie, and the rest of the gang are unaware that the Crimson Blade is actually Miltie. With Mr. Dyrenforth due for appendicitis, the school board appoints Ms. Fleming to run the school while he's away. In her stint as principal, Ms. Fleming creates a doctrine that prevents the students from singing or dancing in the halls in an attempt to quite the school environment. Believing that Crimson Blade's antics are encouraging insubordination, Ms. Fleming cancels the play. Naturally, the kids fight back. (Olivia Barash and Dick Miller join the cast and gain a credit at the beginning of the show as Maxie Sharp and Lou Mackie). Guest starring Robert Romanus (as Miltie Horowitz), Darren Dalton (as Doug Logan), and Alison LaPlaca (as Ms. Audrey Fleming). Co-starring Keith Mills (as Dr. Korngold) and Carolyn J. Silas (as Laura Mackie). Featuring Richard D. Murphy (as The Student).
| 126 | 14 | "Pros and Cons" | Michael Switzer | Elizabeth K. Doswell | February 9, 1987 |
After returning from her high school reunion, Lydia is despondent when Mrs. Berg and Mr. Seger ask her about seeing her old fling Billy Waters. Mr. Seger gets her to admit that she's still fond of him. Following a brief search to find Billy, he turns up instead after hearing that Lydia's been asking for him. She's thrilled that he's in town but she learns in time that with his job as a stock broker, he's a very busy man. According to special investigator Elias Sellers, Billy is one of the biggest scam artists in pursuit. Instead of removing herself from him, she gets involved with his stock swindling act. With a broken furnace at Lou's Lanes, Lou inadvertently ends up calling Ian's dad to fix it. Ian is uneasy when his friends start enjoying his father's company. Guest starring Julius J. Carry III as (Billy Waters) and Grainger Hines as (Elias Sellers). Special Appearance by Michael Preston as (Jack Ware). Co-starring Patrik Baldauff (as Clifton Bauer) and Carolyn J. Silas (as Laura Mackie).
| 127 | 15 | "The Big Contract" | Harry S. Longstreet | Melinda Bell | February 16, 1987 |
When Lou's estranged brother Duke shows up unexpectedly at the bowling alley, Lou is far from thrilled. Lou becomes furious when he learns that Chris signed a contract to do an album for his brother who he reveals to be involved in criminal activity. Duke convinces Chris that his brother's accusations are false and they begin working on the album. Chris and Lou fall out when Chris accuses his former boss of jealousy but he slowly sees Duke's slimy nature and opts to get out of his contract. Mr. Dyrenforth appoints Mr. Seger supervising teacher of the school newspaper committee in an effort to encourage his extracurricular involvement. He agrees to do it convinced that it will be a simple task but he soon learns that with Reggie and Maxie disagreeing on almost everything, it's anything but easy. Guest starring Russell Johnson (as Duke Mackie) and Gary Wood (as Grover). Co-starring Carolyn J. Silas (as Laura Mackie), Lew Gallo (as Rupert Ritzik), Larry Spinak (as Duane Doberman), and Teri Hafford (as Attractive Woman).
| 128 | 16 | "Stradi-various" | Michael Rhodes | Ralph Phillips | February 23, 1987 |
The episode starts with Chris, Jesse, Danny, and Reggie fighting over a violin. Mr. Shorofsky explains… Frustrated with looking for a new apartment, Mrs. Berg lifts Mr. Shorofsky's spirits when she hands him a package originally sent to him in 1947. In the package is a very special violin. According to Mr. Shorofsky, the violin was believed to be magical. The myth tells the story of a girl who was lonely. Her father decided to build her a magic violin and with its power, her doll turns into a prince. With a stalled romantic life, Danny is envious of Chris and wants to be like him. After hesitantly wishing on the violin for an apartment, he gets an immediate call for a place. The kids are convinced of its magic powers. When Reggie wishes for Ian to be more romantic it comes true, when Danny wishes to have more luck with the ladies, like Chris, that also comes true, and when Jesse dreams of Morey Amsterdam, his dismal stand-up act becomes a hit getting him an audition with the Comedy stop. Chris isn't too happy about his change in fortune and with Ian's affection annoying Reggie, the fight in the opening sequence begins. After damaging the violin, Mr. Shorfosky reveals that the violin that they damaged came from a pawn shop. Guest starring Tasia Valenza (as Denise Hudson) and Special Appearance by Morey Amsterdam (as Morey/Rick). Co-starring Carolyn J. Silas (as Laura Mackie), Alan Abelew (as Dugan), and Al Pugliese (as Pratt). Featuring Katie Rich (as The Brunette).
| 129 | 17 | "That Was the Weekend That Was" | Michael Switzer | Story by : Robert Caplain; Teleplay by : Barry Jacobs & Stuart Jacobs | March 16, 1987 |
Christopher, Leroy, Jillian and Miltie create frustration for Jesse who, with a key borrowed from Shorofsky, lets them all into the school on a Saturday to complete a weekend project. Guest starring Robert Donner (as Exalted Muskrat), Trevor Henley (as Patrick Becket), Martha Quinn (as Linda Hayden) and Lee Ving (as Fred)
| 130 | 18 | "Ian's Girl" | Win Phelps | Peggy Goldman | March 23, 1987 |
Mr. Shorofsky wants to enter Ian into a competition for classical guitarists in Segovia but being an insubordinate musician, Ian is adamantly uninterested. Ian's old band, The Driven, flies from England to visit their old band-mate. This gives resurgence to his old relationship with his old girlfriend and band-mate Joanna. With his visitors reminding him of how much he's changed and learning of Joanna's pending departure to Boston, he begins to regret his decision to have left in the first place. After Mr. Shorofsky underhandedly enters Ian into the competition, he decides to go back to England with Joanna. After learning of his importance to Reggie, the school, and his friends, he may be persuaded to stay. Lou recruits Laura, Danny, and Chris to organize his campaign for President of the Metropolitan Bowling Operators Association but later opts to back out. His competition, Casper Wintergreen unaware of Lou's resignation, tries to buy him off which inspires Lou to re-enter the election. Guest Starring Traci Lind (as Joanna), Fred Willard (as Casper Wintergreen), and Carolyn J. Silas (as Laura Mackie). Co-starring Gregory Cooke (as Will), Sandor Black (as Tony), and Steve Cooper (as Nick).
| 131 | 19 | "Best Buddies" | Jaime Rogers | Richard Manning & Hans Beimler | March 30, 1987 |
Danny's childhood friend Ron surprises him when he tells him he's working for Lou at Lou's Lanes. Following their bout of re-acquaintance, Ron reveals to Danny that he's gay and though Danny assures him that they’ll remain friends, his discomfort with the revelation is more than apparent. When Danny tries to set Ron up with Maxie, he insists that Danny accept who he is. Ron has left home because after revealing to his father that he is gay, his father has become suspicious of him. Feeling like he can't depend on his family, he finds solace in Danny but as things move forward, Danny becomes increasingly consumed with his friend's homosexuality. When Ron confronts Danny with his homophobia, Danny calls Ron a faggot sending Ron into exile. Dippy Dave, the owner of a store that sells stereos, has recruited Miss Grant to choreograph a routine for his new commercial. She asks Leroy to help with his ideas for the choreography but with the imminent case of creative differences, the two decide to branch off a provide Dippy Dave with two routines to choose from.. Guest Starring Ivan Kane (as Ron Stefano), Richard Bright (as Al Stefano), and Wynn Irwin (as Dippy Dave). Co-starring Tom Breznahan (as Charlie), Randy Allaire (as Vince), and Carolyn J. Silas (as Laura Mackie).
| 132 | 20 | "The Lounge Singer Who Knew Too Much" | Michael Rhodes | Elizabeth K. Doswell | April 20, 1987 |
Chris is determined to be a hero, inspired by a local hero, he develops a theory that says you get what you expect. Jullian is typing Chris' resume on a computer at her job at General Overdyne, a big company uptown, and accidentally accesses a top secret database sending the information to Chris. Chris becomes concerned when his apartment is mysteriously ransacked and re-arranged. Two men apprehend Chris on several occasions in an Ice Cream truck. Realizing the significance of the video, Chris switches the tape with Dusty's tape and he decides to contact the CIA, upon learning of switched tapes, a chase ensues. With an up-and-coming student video contest, Reggie's set to cover a fictional confrontation between Steve McQueen and Dorothy Dandridge portrayed by Mr. Seger and Miss Grant, Ian is to observe Chris's theory at work, and Dusty is documenting noses but with the subjects of each said video being difficult, finishing their videos on time proves problematic. Guest Starring Sam Ingraffia (as Ostrin), Nicholas Worth (as Gallupo), and Trevor Henley (as Patrick Beckett). Co-starring Carolyn J. Silas (as Laura Mackie). Featuring Beau Bishop (as Messenger), Jillian Katz (as Melissa), Lisa Fuller (as Rocket Cola Girl), and Wayne Collins Jr. (as Ice Cream Brat).
| 133 | 21 | "Reggie and Rose" | Kevin Rodney Sullivan | Susan Goldberg | April 27, 1987 |
Getting kicked out of English class again, the gang tries to persuade Reggie to apologize to her teacher. Reggie doesn't feel she needs to apologize for anything but Rose, the cafeteria lady, makes her understand the importance of impartiality. With the school board making budget cutbacks, Mr. Dyrenforth is forced to lay off Rose. Reggie expectedly protests Rose's termination. Realizing that she can't do anything about Rose's job, Reggie persuades her to audition as a student at the School of the Arts. After getting in, she starts out feeling awkward and out of place but quickly joins ranks with the others and receives praises from members of the faculty. After avoiding the discussion about trying out for Mr. Shorofsky's friend's summer stock company, Mr. Shorofsky finally gets Reggie to discuss it in class and she openly turns it down. Rose tells her that it would be a foot in the door and Reggie, persuaded, convinces Rose to audition with her. When it comes down to the audition, Rose chokes and decides to give up on the stock company and the school but with her School of the Arts experience, she discovers her passion for performing and continues to perform outside of the school. Special Guest Star Carol Burnett (as Rose). Special Cameo Appearance by Denny Dillon (as Corky The Cashier). Featuring Randy Allaire (as Vince), and Lew Gallo (as Andrew Rotter's Voice).
| 134 | 22 | "Of Cabbages and Kings" | Debbie Allen | Ira Steven Behr | May 4, 1987 |
The National Cultural Center has selected The School of the Arts to contribute an item to a time capsule that will be opened a century later. Reggie and Jullian are in charge of the screening of donated items but each student wants to donate something that is significant to only them. Miss Grant comes up with the idea to make a film documenting work and life at the School of the Arts but after filming the piece, still nobody can agree on an item. With the students enthused about the honour, Miltie of course is instead up to his usual schemes. Mr. Dyrenforth warns him about his potentially being kicked out of the school. When asked to compose an original piece for his assignment, Miltie goofs off. Mr. Shorofsky threatens to fail him if he doesn't comply. Struggling to write his song, Miltie tries to pass a fourteenth-century ballad off for his own. Guest starring Robert Romanus (as Miltie Horowitz). Featuring Larry Moss (as The Foreign Man) and George Milan (as Rosen).
| 135 | 23 | "Alice Doesn't Work Here Anymore" | Harry S. Longstreet | Renee Longstreet & Harry Longstreet | May 11, 1987 |
On the day that progress reports are to be mailed to parents, Jullian asks Mrs. Berg to keep her failure notice for a few days. After receiving a letter from a former lover Lewis, who's planning to visit her in New York City, Mrs. Berg requests an indefinite leave of absence. When Jullian meets with Mrs. Berg at her home, Mrs. Berg advises her to face up to her parents in light of one of her lies from the past coming back to haunt her. After visiting Mrs. Berg, Jullian not only learns of her past as an actress but she also learns that she told her former lover she was the principal of the school. The kids come up with a plan to have Mrs. Berg impersonate a principal. After attempting to go through with the charade and later declining the suggestion, Lewis surprises her when he turns up unannounced. Mrs. Berg decides to go through with the act and manages to concoct a convincing history for Lewis during dinner but when he comes to visit her at school; their plan to keep Mr. Dyrenforth away may blow up in their faces. Working as a teacher's assistant in Chemistry class, Reggie covers for Gordon, a squeamish animal-lover, through his refusal to dissect a frog. With the teacher Miss Maguire insisting that he complete the dissection, Reggie and Gordon stage a protest in favour of a computer program that allows the students to perform virtual dissections. Guest Starring Robert Romanus (as Miltie Horowitz), Diane Civita (as Miss Maguire), Jan Rubes (as Lewis), and Greg Longstreet (as Gordon). Co-starring Carolyn J. Silas (as Laura Mackie), Mary Kane (as Faye), Patrick Gorman (as Morris), and Cam Clarke (as Charlie). Featuring David Kock (as Burns), Glenn Casale (as The Mailman), Marie Capitti (as Marie), Lisa Hudson (as Lisa), and Elizabeth Sharp (as The Student).
| 136 | 24 | "Baby, Remember My Name" | Debbie Allen | Michael McGreevey | May 18, 1987 |
The school of the arts is experimenting with their first video yearbook but they don't have a theme. Mr. Dyrenforth advises the kids to take advantage of alumni week interviewing past students Bruno, Coco, Doris, Montgomery, Holly, and Chris. Mr. Dyrenforth informs Leroy that he needs to undergo a compulsory re-evaluation as he lacks a credential. After two years teaching at the school, Miss Grant suggests that Leroy leave the school to pursue his dancing. She gets her friend, big-time actor, and school of the arts alumnus Michael Taftner to consider Leroy for the lead for the alumni week show but after working with Leroy, Michael doesn't feel he can't cut it and decides to replace him. With Leroy overhearing Michael's decision to dismiss him, Miss Grant is the only one who believes in Leroy's ability to pull off the lead. Christopher has been invited back to the school as guest speaker for Mr. Seger's class but when he lies about his success since graduating, he and Mr. Seger butt heads. Guest starring Lee Curreri (as Bruno) and Russ Tamblyn (as Michael Taftner). Special Cameo Appearance by Cynthia Gibb (as Holly), Erica Gimpel (as Coco), Carol Mayo Jenkins (as Sherwood), Valerie Landsburg (as Doris), P. R. Paul (as Montgomery), and Robert Romanus (as Miltie). Co-starring Carolyn J. Silas (as Laura Mackie). Featuring Tita Omeze (as The Student).

== U.S. television ratings ==
| Season | Episodes | Start date | End date | Nielsen rank | Nielsen rating |
|---|---|---|---|---|---|
| 1981–82 | 16 | January 7, 1982 | May 6, 1982 | 65 | N/A |
| 1982–83 | 23 | September 30, 1982 | April 7, 1983 | 71 | N/A |

== See also ==
- Fame Looks At Music '83
