= Fame Looks at Music '83 =

- Fame episode
- Episode no.: Season 3 Episode 50
- Directed by: Walter C. Miller
- Written by: Ken Ehrlich
- Original air date: January 28, 1984

Guest appearance
- Irene Cara

Episode chronology
← Previous "Equals"	Next → "Appearances"

Fame Looks at Music '83 was a special concert episode for the third season of the hit TV series Fame. The concert took place on December 27, 1983, at the Santa Monica Civic Auditorium in Santa Monica, California before a live capacity audience. The broadcast was aired on January 28, 1984. This special features the cast of Fame, billed as "The Kids from Fame," along with the season three regular dancers. The concert is the second of the season, their first concert in the U.S., and their third overall. The concert featured performances of popular music by the cast taking a look back at popular music in the year 1983 (See 1983 in music). Guest starring was Irene Cara, who sang "Fame" — the song an Academy Award winner — originally for the film of the same title in which she also starred as the original Coco.

== Set list ==
1. "1999" – Performed by the Band (Originally by Prince)
2. "Sweet Dreams (Are Made of This)" – Performed by Debbie Allen (Originally by The Eurythmics)
3. "Electric Avenue" – Performed by Gene Anthony Ray (Originally by Eddy Grant)
4. "Gloria" – Performed by Valerie Landsburg (Originally by Laura Branigan)
5. "Little Red Corvette" – Performed by Cynthia Gibb and Carlo Imperato (Originally by Prince)
6. "Puttin' on the Ritz" – Performed by Billy Hufsey (Originally by Taco)
7. "All Night Long (All Night)" – Performed by the Band (Originally by Lionel Richie)
8. "Total Eclipse of the Heart" – Performed by Valerie Landsburg (Originally by Bonnie Tyler)
9. "Love Is a Battlefield" – Performed by Valerie Landsburg (Originally by Pat Benatar)
10. "Tell Her About It" – Performed by Carlo Imperato (Originally by Billy Joel)
11. "Why Me?" – Performed by Irene Cara
12. "Maniac" – Performed by Billy Hufsey (by Michael Sembello)
13. "Take Me to Heart" – Performed by Cynthia Gibb (Originally by Quarterflash)
14. "Heart Attack" – Performed by Cynthia Gibb (Originally by Olivia Newton-John)
  - Tribute to Michael Jackson (with the "Fame" dancers):
15. "Beat It" – Performed by Debbie Allen
16. "Baby Be Mine" – Performed by Debbie Allen
17. "Billie Jean" – Performed by Debbie Allen
  - ---End---
18. "Cold Blooded" – Performed by Gene Anthony Ray (Originally by Rick James)
19. "We've Got Tonight" – Performed by Cynthia Gibb and Billy Hufsey (Originally by Kenny Rogers and Sheena Easton)
20. "You Are" – Performed by Debbie Allen and Gene Anthony Ray (Originally by Lionel Richie)
21. "Never Gonna Let You Go" – Performed by Carlo Imperato, Valerie Landsburg and Cast (Originally by Sérgio Mendes)
22. "Flashdance... What a Feeling" – Performed by Irene Cara
23. "Up Where We Belong" – Performed by the Band (Originally by Joe Cocker and Jennifer Warnes)
24. "Far from Over" – Performed by the Band (Originally by Frank Stallone)
25. "Fame" (Reprise) – Performed by Irene Cara and Cast

== Credits ==
- Producer: Ken Ehrlich
- Directed by: Walter C. Miller
- Written by: Ken Ehrlich
- Concert Staged and Choreographed by: Debbie Allen
- Associate Producer: Greg Sills
- Music Arranged, Conducted, and Produced by: Gary Scott
- Art Director: Ira Diamond
- Costumes Designed by: Warden Neil
- Lighting Designed by: Bob Dickinson
- Producer's Coordinator: Frank Fischer
- Set Dressing by: Leonard Mazzola
- Music Production Assistant: Lori Leiberman
- Assistant Choreographer: Otis Sallid
- Fame Dancers: Derrick Brice, Michael DeLorenzo, Darryl DeWald, Cameron English, Leanne Gerrish, Kimberlee Layton, Joni Palmer, Marguerite Pomerhn, Eartha D. Robinson, Serge Rodnunsky, Allysia Sneed, Bronwyn Thomas, Darryl Tribble, Rocker Verastique, and Margaret Williams.

and

- The Waters: Julia, Luther, Maxine, and Oren.
- Production Associate: Terry McCoy
- Production Assistant: Tracy Long
- Production Associate: Debbie Milder
- Stage Managers: John Marsh, Vince Roxon, and Richard Schor
- Technical Director: Gene Crowe
- Audio: Don Worsham
- Video: Keith Winikoff
- Camera: Sam Dowlen, Tom Heren, Dean Hall, Dave Livisohn, Bill Philhin, and Hector Ramirez.
- Make Up: Jack Wilson
- Wardrobe Assistant: Phyllis Corcoran-Woods
- Post Production Supervisor: Frank Merwald
- ???: Morpheus
- Creative Consultant: David DeSilva
- Video Tape Facilities: Greene Crowe
- Executive in Charge of Production: Ted Zachar

== See also ==
- List of Fame (1982 TV series) episodes
