= Connie Needham =

American actress and dance instructor (born 1959)

- Born: Connie Marie Bowen; December 5, 1959 (age 66); Anaheim, California, U.S.
- Occupations: Actress; dance instructor
- Years active: 1977–1995
- Known for: Elizabeth Bradford in Eight Is Enough
- Spouse: David Needham (m. 1979; div. 2005)
- Children: 2

Connie Needham (born Connie Marie Bowen; December 5, 1959) is an American actress and dance instructor. As Connie Newton, she portrayed Elizabeth Bradford on the television series Eight Is Enough from 1977 to 1981.

== Career ==
Although her most prominent role was as Elizabeth Bradford on the 112 episodes of the series Eight Is Enough and its two subsequent television movies, Needham had nine other appearances after that series ended in 1981.

Needham portrayed two different characters during the run of the television series Fame. Her first appearance was in the episode "To Soar and Never Falter" (1982) as Kathy Murphy, a dancer in the initial stages of multiple sclerosis. The episode won Harry Harris an Emmy Award for Outstanding Directing in a Drama Series. Her other appearances on Fame were as Kelly Hayden in three episodes the following year.

Needham made a guest appearance on the Leslie Nielsen comedy TV series Police Squad! as Jill, a dance teacher who attracts the line "When she leaves, put a tail on her". She appeared in an episode of L.A. Law in 1987, and made her final appearance as a waitress in a 1995 episode of Ellen.

As of November 2006, Needham was working as a dance instructor in Orange County, California, teaching junior jazz and lyrical classes and choreographing team competitions and annual recitals.

== Personal life ==
While credited on screen as Connie Newton, she married David Needham, a set designer on Eight is Enough, on April 7, 1979, during a late season 3 hiatus of the series. Newton switched her screen name to her married name, Connie Needham, from season 4 onwards. David Needham's father is stuntman and film director/producer Hal Needham. Connie and David divorced in 2005. They have two daughters, Kimberly and Taylor.

In July 2009, it was announced that Needham was diagnosed with ovarian cancer. She has since made a full recovery.

== Filmography ==
Film and television
Year	Title	Role	Notes
1977-1981	Eight Is Enough	Elizabeth Bradford	112 episodes
1982	The Love Boat	Debbie Holton	1 episode
1982	Police Squad!	Jill	Episode: "Rendezvous at Big Gulch (Terror in the Neighborhood)"
1982	Fame	Kathy Murphy	Episode: "To Soar and Never Falter"
1983	Fame	Kelly Hayden	3 episodes
1983	An Uncommon Love		TV movie
1987	Eight Is Enough: A Family Reunion	Elizabeth Bradford	TV movie
1987	L.A. Law	Denise Franklin	Episode: "Brackman Vasektimized"
1989	An Eight Is Enough Wedding	Elizabeth Bradford	TV movie
1995	Ellen	Waitress	Episode: "Gladiators"
