= Stephanie E. Williams =

American actress (born 1957)

- Born: Stephanie E. Williams; February 4, 1959 (age 67); St. Louis, Missouri, U.S.
- Occupation: Actress
- Years active: 1981–2009

Stephanie E. Williams (born February 4, 1959) is an American actress best known for her work on TV soap operas, first on CBS-TV's The Young and the Restless as Amy Lewis, a character she portrayed from January 1983 to March 1988, then on ABC-TV's General Hospital as Dr. Simone Hardy and also on ABC-TV's One Life to Live as Sheila Price.

== Life and career ==
Born and reared in St. Louis, Missouri, Williams attended University City High School where she danced, performed gymnastics, appeared in school musicals and was chosen Homecoming Queen. She attended Webster University in St. Louis and the University of Missouri in Kansas City on dance scholarships, while independently studying psychology.

=== Dancing career ===
After dance performances at the St. Louis Municipal Opera and the Kansas City Starlight Theater, Williams decided to pursue a professional dancing career and moved to New York City after auditioning and winning a dance scholarship to the Alvin Ailey Dance Academy. Shortly thereafter, she made her New York debut as a dancer in an off-Broadway production of "Take It from the Top," which was written, produced and directed by legendary actors Ossie Davis and Ruby Dee.

In 1980 she landed a featured dancing role in the Broadway revival of "West Side Story," and danced on her birth date of February 4 at the White House for the 39th President of the United States, Jimmy Carter. Later that year she won a role in the feature film, The Fan, starring Lauren Bacall and James Garner.

=== Hollywood acting ===
In 1981, Williams moved to Los Angeles to portray the role of dancer Stephanie Harrison on the hit NBC television series, Fame. While on Fame, she served as assistant choreographer to director/actress Debbie Allen. In 1985, she was one of the three hottest soap-opera couples chosen to be on the cover of TV Guide. She also appeared in the 1985 James Ingram music video "I Want to Come Back" which was directed by Allen. In 1986 she was a nominee for the NAACP Image Awards as best supporting actress in a daytime drama for her role as Amy Lewis on The Young and The Restless.

She also had roles in Boiling Point, Meteor Man, Murder at Midnight, and Back to the Future Part II. On the Los Angeles stage she appeared in such productions as "The Choice Is Yours," "A Woman’s Choice" and "Ceremonies in Dark Old Men." In 2000, Williams narrated a musical tribute to Porgy and Bess for the Compton Heights Band in St. Louis, Missouri.

Additionally, Williams guest-starred on several prime-time television series such as Moesha, Parenthood, Roc, A Different World, Midnight Caller, The Love Boat, and had a recurring role as Alexis’ secretary Pamela, on the ABC-TV series Dynasty. She also performed in Robert Townsend and His Partners in Crime, a three-part television special in which she served as choreographer of the first part.

=== Radio/Other appearances ===
Williams co-hosted songwriter Stevie Wonder's KJLH and Fort Lauderdale's Mystik 1580 morning radio show. She also co-produced the Mystik Kids literacy radio show, as well as, an annual 24-hour radio-thon on Florida's Mystik 1580 radio station, which benefited their new African-American Research Library and Cultural Center in Fort Lauderdale, Florida.

Williams co-founded a non-profit organization in 1991, which collaborated with the Los Angeles Unified School District to promote literacy among children. As a result, the "Books Brighten Your Life Campaign" was created honoring our first mentor LeVar Burton for his "Reading Rainbow" legacy.

She also founded the Brighten Your Life Youth Foundation, Inc and P.Y.G.O. Inner-Prizes, Inc., which operated out of New York and Los Angeles, California until recently when re-structured and renamed for her Saint Louis, Missouri, endeavors.

=== Public speaking ===
Since the early 1980s Williams has been publicly speaking to school assemblies and organizations around the country including: the American Heart Association, MD Anderson Cancer Institute, Grace Hill, NAACP ACT-SO, Faith Based Organizations, Correctional Institutions in Bermuda, Chino, California and Saint Louis, Missouri. Williams also was a committee member for University City's "Proposition U" and was awarded a certificate of recognition for informing community residents and helping to pass the tax initiative to rebuild University City schools. On May 9, 2013, her P.Y.G.O. Ed-u-tainment Group provided the entertainment for the University City Chamber of Commerce's "A Taste of U. City" event - a fundraiser and showcase of over thirty University City Businesses.

=== Recent ===
In 2013, Williams was elected as one of two permanent YWCA – Pagedale Policy Council Parent Representatives to act as a link between the people making and carrying out decisions, and the people Head Start/Early Head Start serve sitting on three committees; she also served as chairman of the Evaluation Committee. On May 5, 2014, Williams received a Head Start Volunteer Award Certificate for outstanding service at the YWCA-Pagedale Center.

On May 14, 2014, Williams graduated from a 12-week Step Up To Leadership Course facilitated by the Community Action Agency of Saint Louis County, Inc (CAASTLC) and later partnered with a classmate to create an introductory 6 week book club reading room for children between the ages of 5 and 14 to increase literacy, and instill a love for reading by bringing books to life through the art of acting and dancing at "R.A.A.," a local St. Louis non-profit organization.

== Partial filmography ==
- The Fan (1981) - Dancer
- Back to the Future Part II (1989) - Officer Foley
- Boiling Point (1993) - Sally Mercer
- The Meteor Man (1993) - Stacy a Teacher
- Pay the Price (2000) - Upset Fan #2
- The Nation (2009) - Betty
