= Kenneth Ehrlich =

American television producer and director

Ken Ehrlich
- Born: Kenneth James Ehrlich; May 11, 1943 (age 83); Cleveland Heights, Ohio, U.S.
- Education: Ohio University
- Occupations: Television producer (Grammy Award, Emmy Award ceremonies)
- Spouse: Harriet Ehrlich

Kenneth James "Ken" Ehrlich (born May 11, 1943) is an American television producer and director.

== Early life and education ==
Ehrlich was born and raised in Cleveland Heights, Ohio, where he graduated from Cleveland Heights High School in 1960. and from Ohio University in 1964 with a bachelor's degree in journalism. After he graduated from college, he moved to Chicago with his wife Harriet.

== Career ==
Ehrlich has produced network television programs since 1974, when he created the PBS music series, Soundstage for Chicago public television. He moved to Los Angeles two years later, where he continued his career, which has included more than three decades of telecasting Grammy and Emmy Award ceremonies. Beginning in 1980, he began producing the Grammy Award telecasts for CBS, and is responsible for creating the concept of "Grammy moments", which have included such memorable performances by Prince, Nicki Minaj, and Beyoncé, Aretha Franklin's operatic debut, the famous Eminem-Elton John duet, as well as the Melissa Etheridge-Joss Stone duet, and historic reunions between Paul Simon and Art Garfunkel, and the musical group, The Police. In 2010, he was presented with the Recording Academy's President's Award for his long-time service to the Grammy Awards event.

Ehrlich has produced such specials as "The Sports Illustrated 20th Century Sports Awards" (2000), "In Performance at the White House: Music of the Civil Rights Movement" (2009), "The NFL Kickoff Spectacular in Times Square" (2002), "Mandela Freedomfest" (1988), "Live 8 - The Philadelphia LIVE 8 event" (2006) as well as numerous other prime time specials for both broadcast and cable networks. In 2012, he produced the Rolling Stones' highly successful 50th Anniversary pay per view special. He also directed Celine Dion's New Las Vegas Show, which has just completed the first three-year leg of an extended run at the Colosseum at Caesars Palace. He has worked with Dion and husband Rene Angelil on Dion's television specials since 1995.

In 2006, Anschutz Entertainment Group, AEG, purchased an unspecified piece of Ken Ehrlich Productions, and in 2012, that joint venture was extended for a second five-year term.

Since 2010, Ehrlich has produced annual PBS shows produced (in cooperation with WETA and the Grammy Museum) in the East Room of the White House, with a broad spectrum of artists ranging from Mick Jagger, Bob Dylan, Aretha Franklin and Justin Timberlake to Mavis Staples, Ariana Grande, Gary Clark Jr. and Cyndi Lauper.

In 2012, with Ehrlich as executive producer, the Grammys received a 39.9 rating, its highest rating since 1984, beating the Academy Awards for the first time since that date. Observers credited this to the show's response to the death of Whitney Houston, while producers said that an extremely strong show that ranged from performances by Nicki Minaj, Katy Perry, Paul McCartney, Bruce Springsteen, Taylor Swift and tributes to The Beach Boys and Glen Campbell were heavily responsible for the ratings bump. The show also featured the return of Chris Brown after a three-year absence. (Brown's last appearance on the show was cancelled due to his attack on his then-girlfriend Rihanna the night before the Grammy Show in 2009.)

In 2014, on two successive nights, Ehrlich executive produced the 56th Grammy Awards, his 34th Grammy show, and then The Beatles: The Night that Changed America, an all star celebration commemorating the 50th anniversary of the Beatles appearance on The Ed Sullivan Show.

Ehrlich returned as executive producer for the 57th Grammy Awards in 2015, followed by Stevie Wonder: Songs in the Key of Life - A Grammy Salute Special two days later.

Ehrlich also directed Mariah Carey's residency show, #1 to Infinity, at The Colosseum at Caesar's Palace in Las Vegas in 2015.

It was announced in July 2019 that Ehrlich would step down from his role as executive producer of the Grammy Awards following the 2020 awards ceremony. Before his resignation a number of artists, including Ariana Grande, Nicki Minaj, Lorde, and Frank Ocean, had criticised Ehrlich's role in the Grammy Awards.

=== Honors and awards ===
Ehrlich has been nominated for five Emmy Awards, is the recipient of one Golden Globe Award, and was presented with the Producers Guild of America Visionary Award in 2007.

Ehrlich was invited to the February 11, 2014 White House State Dinner.

The Hollywood Chamber of Commerce honored television producer Ken Ehrlich with the 2,541st star on the Hollywood Walk of Fame on January 28, 2015. The star in the category of Television was dedicated in front of the historic Capitol Records Building at 1750 N. Vine Street.

It is time we honor the man who successfully elevated and transformed the artists and their music we love into memorable moments on live Television. Ken Ehrlich's magical productions have touched millions of people watching these shows around the world and we are pleased to welcome him to our family of stars on Hollywood Walk of Fame. - Leron Gubler, President of the Hollywood Chamber of Commerce

Helping him to unveil the star were his friends John Legend, Stevie Wonder, LL Cool J and Smokey Robinson.

== Personal life ==
Ehrlich lives in Westlake Village, California with his wife Harriet.
