= Charlie Semine =

American actor

- Born: October 28, 1980 (age 45); Marblehead, Massachusetts, United States
- Occupation: Actor
- Years active: 2006–present
- Known for: BrainDead, Mercy, and The Following
- Spouse: Roxanna Hope Radja

Charlie Semine (born October 28, 1980) is an American actor, known for BrainDead, Mercy, and The Following.

== Life and career ==
Born in Marblehead, Massachusetts to Christian and Deborah, Semine is a graduate of Marblehead High School, Tufts University and Yale School of Drama. He lives in New York City with his wife Roxanna Hope Raja.

In 2017 he performed in the Broadway premiere of Junk by Ayad Akhtar at Lincoln Center Theater.

== Filmography ==
Film, television and video games
Year	Title	Role	Notes
2006	iChannel	Tommy	as Charles Semine
2008	Law & Order	Michael	Episode: "Illegal"
2009–2010	Mercy	Nick Valentino	Recurring, 19 episodes
2010	Damages	Boyfriend	Episode: "Tell Me I'm Not Racist"
2011	Body of Proof	Shane Rinaldi	Episode: "Broken Home"
2011	Mr. Popper's Penguins	Cop #2 (Quint)	
2011	The Good Wife	Lt. Matt Ventura	Episode: "Whiskey Tango Foxtrot"
2012	Incoming	Man	Short film
2012	A Gifted Man	Joel Mitchell	Episode: "In Case of Heart Failure"
2012	Smash	Paul Denby	4 episodes
2012	Max Payne 3	Tony Demarco	Voice, as Charles Semine
2013	Person of Interest	Justin Ogilvie	Episode: "One Percent"
2013	The Following	Alex Lipton	2 episodes
2014	Blue Bloods	Officer Randy Cutter	Episode: "Custody Battle"
2014	Friends and Romans	Paulie / Goldberg	
2015	Limitless	FBI Agent	Episode: "Page 44"
2015	Flesh and Bone	Cameron Miller	3 episodes
2016	BrainDead	Anthony Onofrio	Main role, 8 episodes
2017	Aardvark	Dad	
2017	Bull	Gary Sharpe	Episode: "Benevolent Deception"
2018	Instinct	Steve Rizzo	Episode: "Owned"
2019	Elementary	Stewart Pringle / Wilson Kubiak	Episode: "Unfriended"
2019	Prodigal Son	Jake	Episode: "All Souls and Sadists"
2021	The Equalizer	Frank Sadler	Episode: "Glory"
2021	The Good Fight	Officer Ribisi	Episode: "And the End Was Violent..."
2022	Evil	Logan Wendig	Episode: "The Demon of Parenthood"
2023	The Blacklist	Anton Johnston	Episode: "The Dockery Affair"
