= BrainDead =

American political satire television series

- Genre: Political satire; Comedy drama; Science fiction
- Created by: Robert King; Michelle King
- Starring: Mary Elizabeth Winstead; Danny Pino; Aaron Tveit; Tony Shalhoub; Nikki M. James; Johnny Ray Gill; Charlie Semine; Jan Maxwell
- Composer: David Buckley
- Country of origin: United States
- Original language: English
- No. of seasons: 1
- No. of episodes: 13

Production
- Executive producers: Robert King; Michelle King; Ridley Scott; David W. Zucker
- Running time: 43–44 minutes
- Production companies: Scott Free Productions; King Size Productions; CBS Television Studios

Original release
- Network: CBS
- Release: June 13 – September 11, 2016

BrainDead is an American political satire science fiction comedy-drama television series created by Robert and Michelle King. The series stars Mary Elizabeth Winstead as Laurel Healy, a documentary film-maker who takes a job working for her brother Luke (Danny Pino), a U.S. Senator, after the funding for her latest film falls through. Assigned as his new constituency caseworker, she discovers that Washington, D.C. has been invaded by extraterrestrial insects which are eating the brains and taking control of people, including members of Congress and their staffers. Much of the internal comedy of the series was that, in the altered reality of Washington, D.C. politics, only a few people noticed.

CBS announced a 13-episode straight-to-series order on July 22, 2015. The show premiered on June 13, 2016. After four episodes, the show moved from its Monday timeslot to Sundays to make room for the network's coverage of the Republican and Democratic National Conventions. The show had a planned four-season arc, which would have seen the bugs then invade Wall Street, Silicon Valley and Hollywood, but on October 17, 2016, CBS canceled the series after one season.

== Premise ==
The series centers on the Capitol in Washington, D.C., where alien bugs infect members of Congress.

Documentary filmmaker Laurel Healy agrees to take a job working for her brother, Democratic Senator Luke Healy, in order to secure funding for her next film. However, she comes across a conspiracy in which alien bugs have partially replaced the brains of several people, including members of Congress. Sometimes, the bugs cause their victims' heads to explode. The song "You Might Think" by The Cars is used frequently in the series as a leitmotif for characters who are infected by the aliens.

== Cast ==
=== Main ===
- Mary Elizabeth Winstead as Laurel Healy, a documentary filmmaker who takes a job as a constituency caseworker working for her brother, Senator Luke Healy, and stumbles across the bug conspiracy
- Danny Pino as U.S. Senator Luke Healy (D-Md.), Laurel's brother, who is the Senate Majority Whip
- Tony Shalhoub as U.S. Senator Raymond "Red" Wheatus (R-Md.), a Republican Senator who is one of the first people to have their brains eaten and replaced by the aliens
- Aaron Tveit as Gareth Ritter, a staffer for Senator Wheatus who befriends Laurel, despite their extremely different political beliefs
- Nikki M. James as Dr. Rochelle Daudier, a medical doctor who befriends Laurel and Gustav and helps them uncover the bug conspiracy
- Jan Maxwell as U.S. Senator Ella Pollack (D-Ca)
- Johnny Ray Gill as Gustav Triplett a.k.a. Dr. Bob, a pseudo-scientist and conspiracist who has discovered the existence of the aliens and how they communicate
- Charlie Semine as FBI agent Anthony Onofrio

=== Recurring ===
- Paige Patterson as Scarlett Pierce, Senator Healy's Chief of Staff and one of his mistresses
- Megan Hilty as Misty Alise, a conservative political television commentator
- Beth Malone as Claudia Monarch, a liberal political television commentator
- Zach Grenier as Dean Healy, former U.S. Senator and father of Laurel and Luke
- Brooke Adams as U.S. Senator Diane Vaynerchuk
- Wayne Duvall as U.S. Senator Andre Amarant, Republican Leader in the Senate
- Glenn Fleshler as FBI Agent Aaron Blades, Onofrio's partner
- Patrick Breen as Cole Stockwell, a budget analyst hired by Luke
- Lily Cowles as Germaine Healy, Senator Luke Healy's pregnant wife

=== Guest ===
- Margo Martindale as Dr. Joanne Alaimo
- Michael Moore as himself
- Kurt Fuller as J.K. Cornish, FBI torturer
- Michael Gaston as Lawrence Boch, a special investigator
- Santino Fontana as Kevin, an infected who gets captured by Rochelle
- Michael Potts as Dr. Daudier, a doctor conducting a joint operation with the Russian Institute on the retrieval of a meteor

== Production ==
Singer-songwriter Jonathan Coulton wrote and performed musical recap segments of previous episodes, shown during the cold opening of each episode. There were exceptions to this, however: one episode instead opened with a parody commercial for "Space Bugs" in the style of prescription drug commercials in the musical style of the other recaps, while in another recap the singer, after admitting that the previous episode was too overwhelming to recap, recapped an episode of the western Gunsmoke instead.

== Episodes ==
No.	Title	Directed by	Written by	Original release date	US viewers (millions)
1	"The Insanity Principle: How Extremism in Politics is Threatening Democracy in the 21st Century"	Robert King	Robert King & Michelle King	June 13, 2016	4.59
After funding falls through for her latest documentary, Laurel Healy accepts an offer from her father to work for her brother, Senator Luke Healy, and he will give her half the money. Meanwhile, a large meteor is recovered in Russia and sent to the United States aboard a commercial ship; a large colony of ant-like aliens nesting inside escape and infect the crew. The chief engineer's wife becomes suspicious and alerts Laurel, who learns that Luke's office authorized the shipment. A congressional feud over the budget forces a government shutdown before the meteor can be properly secured and the aliens spread throughout the city to infect others. Laurel arranges a meeting between Luke and Republican Senator Red Wheatus to end the shutdown, with the help of Red's staffer Gareth Ritter. The two forge a compromise, but Red is infected later that evening and reneges on the deal. He instead persuades Senator Spitz to defect and give the Republicans the majority. While investigating the lab where the meteor was taken, Laurel finds the lead scientist, Dr. Daudier, unconscious. Before he can be treated, his head explodes, killing him. Returning to the Capitol, Laurel helps Luke move into his new offices and suspects that his Chief of Staff and lover Scarlett has also been infected.
2	"Playing Politics: Living Life in the Shadow of the Budget Showdown – A Critique"	Jim McKay	Larry Kaplow	June 20, 2016	3.46
Laurel meets FBI agent Anthony Onofrio who is investigating the death of Dr. Daudier. She attempts to help a terminally-ill girl in a quest to be photographed at the Lincoln Memorial, which has been hampered by the shutdown. Luke finds out and uses her for political purposes, which backfires when the press discovers her family are atheists. Laurel attends "Tax Prom" with Gareth, and finds out that Senator Barneki is the apparent loser in the game of musical chairs prompted by Senator Spitz' defection. She tells Luke, who meets with Barneki and promises a committee chairmanship and PAC money if he crosses the aisle. The information turns out to have been false, planted by Gareth; Barneki discloses Luke's offer to the media and Luke faces a vote of no confidence as Democratic Whip. Meanwhile, Gustav Triplett witnesses someone's head exploding during a CAT scan. He examines fragments of the man's brain at home and discovers the bugs; in a post online, he appeals for others to come forward. Rochelle, Dr. Daudier's daughter, tells Laurel of the second exploding head, who passes the information to Anthony. Laurel finds Gustav's website and begins writing a reply.
3	"Goring Oxes: How You Can Survive the War on Government Through Five Easy Steps"	Jim McKay	Jonathan Tolins	June 27, 2016	3.29
Luke appears on a political talk show with Red's Chief of Staff, whose head explodes on live television. Gareth is then promoted to Chief of Staff. The aliens infect Senator Ella Pollack, who is running against Luke for Democratic Whip. At a Democratic caucus Ella takes the upper hand. Gustav meets Laurel and they discuss the bugs. She calls Gareth to congratulate him on the promotion, and asks him to go out to celebrate. Ella accuses Luke of womanizing and Luke plans to leak a story in retaliation. Laurel meets with her journalist friend to give her the story and suspects she has been infected as well. Laurel and Gustav then meet with Rochelle to discuss the bugs appearing in the CAT scan. Laurel and Gareth talk at the wake and end up kissing. The story about Ella leaks and she leaks Luke's affair with Scarlett, devastating his wife Germaine. However, she drops her challenge to Luke anyway. Meanwhile, Gustav sets a trap for the bugs in order to capture one, but fails. Red plans to form his own grassroots organization, called the One Wayers. Laurel is interrogated by the FBI concerning the catastrophic head injuries, but Luke intervenes.
4	"Wake Up Grassroots: The Nine Virtues of Participatory Democracy, and How We Can Keep America Great by Encouraging an Informed Electorate"	Allan Arkush	Peter Parnell	July 11, 2016	3.13
Laurel suggests to Anthony that screwworms are causing the exploding heads. Gareth meets with conservative commentator Misty Alise; he prompts her to investigate the One Wayers. Misty later interviews Red about the One Wayers. Gustav suspects his cat was infected and after a CAT scan, with Laurel and Rochelle, determines being deaf in one ear and loss of balance are symptoms. The CDC issues a recall of blood pressure medications suspected of causing CHIs. Ella argues with Red during a meeting to resolve the government shutdown. Gareth tells Laurel that the Republican Senate Majority Leader is willing to compromise and through back channels a deal with sequestration is agreed if a budget is not passed within six months. Laurel, Gustav and Rochelle meet with Dexter Wu of the CDC; he likes their theory, but needs human evidence. They ask Laurel's infected friend Abby, but she refuses and when Anthony compels her to undergo testing, she commits suicide. Gareth meets the One Wayers who want to start posting about bomb-making on their website. Luke and the Majority Leader end the shutdown before Red and Ella can arrive to block it. Laurel comforts Anthony at her apartment, but in the morning she suspects he has been infected.
5	"Back to Work: A Behind-the-Scenes Look at Congress and How It Gets Things Done (and Often Doesn't)"	Allan Arkush	Jacquelyn Reingold	July 24, 2016	2.29
Laurel confides her fears that Anthony may have been infected to Rochelle and Gustav. They suggest drugging sedating him and sneaking him to the hospital for a CAT scan but she balks at the idea. At their request, Laurel asks Luke to pressure the head of the CDC into investigating their screwworm theory. He declines, saying that if the CDC were wrong about blood pressure medicine being to blame, the FDA would be furious. Storming out of a meeting of the Veterans' Affairs Committee, Luke runs into the head of the FDA, who is annoyed at the CDC blaming them for the blood pressure drugs. Later, Laurel, Rochelle and Gustav explain their theory to Luke who says he will speak to the CDC if they get advice from congressional adviser Dr. Joanne Alaimo first. That evening, Laurel goes to Anthony's apartment and he collapses. Gustav bursts in and admits that he sedated him; they attempt to examine Anthony but are interrupted by another woman. Rochelle and Gustav speak with Joanne, who tells Luke that they are "onto something". Laurel sees Anthony and tells him they should stay friends. Gustav theorises that the bugs communicate through high-pitched frequencies. Luke meets with his friend Polly Savident from the CDC. He gives her the groups' theory and they sleep together. When news of Luke's theory gets out, other Senators mock him. Annoyed, Luke tells Laurel to stop talking about bugs. Joanne also appears to be infected. Anthony goes to Laurel's apartment to apologize but tries to attack her; she fights him off and he leaves. Gustav drops off a mosquito net for Laurel, which she installs and then goes to bed; bugs emerge from the flowers Anthony brought her and crawl into her ear.
6	"Notes Toward a Post-Reagan Theory of Party Alliance, Tribalism, and Loyalty: Past as Prologue"	Frederick E.O. Toye	Aurin Squire	July 31, 2016	2.88
Gustav and Rochelle rush to help Laurel. As the bugs went in her left ear, they use the lateralization of brain function to stimulate the intuitive right side of her brain with music, dancing, alcohol and, as Gareth arrives to check on her, sex with him. After they finish, Laurel collapses, Gareth leaves, the bugs flee and Gustav catches one. The next day, Laurel and Gareth avoid each other and Gustav and Rochelle examine the bug, which Gustav is convinced is extra-terrestrial. Forced to seek out Gareth with a constituent's concerns, Senator Wheatus speaks to her first, threatening her and suggesting she go back to California. She sees maps of gerrymandered Maryland congressional districts and speaks with Gareth about this, and about the previous night. During a meeting on the CDC budget, Senator Wheatus objects to spending money on "zombie bug research". Gustav and Rochelle's sample, which they gave to the Dr. Wu, is confiscated and put into storage. Laurel draws a map of the proposed Maryland districts, which she and Gustav think resemble crop circles. Later, Laurel takes out her reporter friend, hoping to flush the bugs out of her head; however, she has been completely taken over by them. Listening to sounds from outer space, Rochelle speeds up the audio: the tune for the song "You Might Think" is audible. Laurel tries to get Luke to do something about the gerrymandered districts; he points out that the new boundaries benefit the Democrats. At another CDC budget meeting, Senator Pollack proposes doubling its budget, which the Republicans will never agree to. Rochelle tells Laurel that Gustav may be right about the bugs being aliens; that evening, Laurel tells Gareth about the bugs.
7	"The Power of Euphemism: How Torture Became a Matter of Debate in American Politics"	Frederick E.O. Toye	Laura Marks	August 7, 2016	1.75
Laurel continues explaining their bug theory to Gareth. In Senator Wheatus' office, a new Queen bug emerges from his ear: larger, winged and laying eggs. He infects his intern and then meets with the FBI director, arguing that the exploding heads are caused by bioterrorists and that the FBI should investigate Laurel. He then causes his intern's head to explode in front of them. Laurel is taken for questioning; they intend to torture her. Gustav and Rochelle become suspicious and go to Gareth. Meanwhile, the FBI go to Luke and Wheatus, as Ranking Member and Chair, respectively, of the Senate Intelligence Committee, for approval to torture Laurel. The FBI refuse to disclose the identity of the subject so approval is granted. Gareth goes to Luke and they receive implicit confirmation from an FBI source that the subject is Laurel. Luke calls the FBI director, who denies it, so Luke subpoenas him to appear before the Intelligence Committee, delaying the torture. Meanwhile, Gustav and Rochelle use equipment to track and communicate with the infected. They then use it to interfere with the Committee's vote on approving the torture of Laurel and she is released. She is reunited with her brother when their father arrives too. Gustav's equipment confirms he has been infected as well.
8	"The Path to War Part One: The Gathering Political Storm"	Brooke Kennedy	Peter Parnell	August 14, 2016	1.78
Gareth tells Laurel that he doesn't think she's crazy and that Senator Wheatus suspects Rochelle and Gustav interfered in the Committee vote. She tells them and they tell her that her father may have been infected. Senator Wheatus presents a witness to the Intelligence Committee who testifies that the Syrian-backed "Ra'id Front" has developed a compound that makes heads explode. Rochelle captures an infected man in her apartment, whom Wheatus sent to follow her. Laurel investigates her father and then confronts him. He says that he has Parkinson's disease but that with the bugs he's fine and the bugs will make the world a better place. Gareth screens another potential Syrian witness but is unconvinced by his ever-changing story. Senator Wheatus implies that he wants a war, and for Gareth to lie for him. Gareth tells Laurel about the witness and they have sex. She then returns home and stops her father from infecting her mother. Wheatus' coached witness appears before the Intelligence Committee and Luke begins his cross-examination but a CIA briefer tells a closed session that the Syrian "witnesses" are frauds and there is no chemical weapons programme in Syria. Meanwhile, Gustav force-feeds Rochelle's captive alcohol, which lessens the bugs control, and he admits that the bugs are from outer space and that their agenda is to create chaos so that nobody stops their invasion. They let him go and Rochelle tails him to an office in the basement of the Senate numbered SRB-54. Wheatus' Queen bug mates with Pollack's King bug and they then speak on Misty Alise's show, implying that the CIA confirmed what the witnesses said. Luke debates with his father and sister about breaking confidentiality to stop a war in Syria.
9	"Taking on Water: How Leaks in D.C. are Discovered and Patched"	Ron Underwood	Jonathan Tolins & Aurin Squire	August 21, 2016	2.02
SRB-54 is a mysterious war room, belonging to Senator Wheatus. The truth about the CIA briefing is leaked. Wheatus has Gareth oversee opposition research on Laurel and the Intelligence Committee appoints a special prosecutor, former Senator Lawrence Boch, to investigate the leaks. Claudia Monarch, who broke the CIA briefing story, refuses to reveal to Boch who on the Committee leaked to her, so he has her arrested. Gareth tricks his way into the war room and sees a clock counting down to September 12 and plans for Syrian refugee internment camps. Wheatus' opposition research claims that she had an abortion during an affair with her professor and slept with Michael Moore at Sundance. Gareth asks Laurel which of them are true. She admits the affair, denies the abortion and admits to Michael Moore, which Gareth can't cope with. Meanwhile, Boch suspects that Laurel or Luke was the leaker. They speak with a lawyer and realise that each thought the other was the leaker. Luke meets with Boch, who had previously written a report on false WMD evidence that led to the Iraq War, and gives him information about SRB-54. He asks Boch to go after Wheatus as the "real culprit" and leave him and Laurel alone. When Boch confronts Wheatus in his office, Wheatus shoots him and has his intern help him dispose of the body, after saving some of the brains for later. When the investigator tells Gareth she was wrong about Michael Moore, he tries to apologize, but she says they are too different for it to work and should take a break. After Boch's disappearance, Claudia is released and she speaks privately with Senator Diane Vaynerchuk, who turns out to be the leaker.
10	"The Path to War Part Two: The Impact of Propaganda on Congressional War Votes"	Felix Alcala	Larry Kaplow	August 28, 2016	2.31
Senators Wheatus and Pollack co-ordinate their "One Wayers" and "No Wayers" to campaign for war ahead of the Committee vote. Luke can't use his PAC's ad to fight them because it just blames the One Percent. He asks Laurel to help the director Ben Valderrama, whom she knows, to fix it. Gareth agrees to be interviewed but walks out when Valderrama ambushes him with loaded questions. Laurel apologizes; Gareth tells her that their friendship is hurting his career. Luke's father pressures him to support the war to further his career. When Germaine asks if Luke is still cheating, Laurel is uncomfortable lying to her, so she forces Luke to break up with his girlfriends, which results in a lot of break-up sex. Laurel becomes worried because the baby kicks every time Donald Trump appears on TV, but tests reveal nothing. Germaine gives birth to a baby girl and Luke promises he will be a better husband now he's a father. He finally tells Scarlett to get a new job. Laurel makes her own ad that exposes Wheatus and Pollack's conspiracy, attacks division and opposes the war. She posts it under Valderrama's name and it goes viral resulting in Senator Vaynerchuk casting the deciding vote against sending the war resolution to the full Senate. Valderrama claims the credit for the brilliant and original ad. At home, Luke is affectionate to Germaine but she isn't interested in him. Or their baby who cries until the mobile plays "You Might Think" producing a smile.
11	"Six Points on the New Congressional Budget: The False Dichotomy of Austerity vs. Expansionary Policies"	Brooke Kennedy	Jacquelyn Reingold & Jonathan Tolins	September 4, 2016	2.33
Gareth sees the Queen bug lay eggs and then enter Senator Wheatus's brain. Wheatus and Pollack unveil their pork-filled budget. Luke's office has only 48 hours to go through it and find out what they are up to before the vote to send it to the Senate. A delegation from the DNC comes to vet Luke for CIA Director if the Democrats win the election. Germaine and Scarlett, now working for Senator Pollack, tell them about all his affairs. But the big problem is when Anthony Onofrio gives them the FBI’s material on Laurel and her bug theory. Laurel manages to convince them that it’s just a metaphor from her viral video. Gareth goes to see Laurel and they meet with Rochelle, Gustav and Dr. Wu to discuss the Queen bug he saw and debate killing the Queen or Wheatus. Gareth tips off Laurel to look in the farm section of the budget where they find hidden funding for Wheatus’s internment camps. Wheatus calls Laurel to meet up where he offers her $2m in funding for her documentary if she goes away. Gareth figures out that the Queen emerged when it was warmer after the AC switched off for the night. So later, Laurel, Gustav and Rochelle ambush Wheatus and wound the Queen but an intern stops them killing her. Isenstadt, the CIA Director's Director, briefs Luke on the bug invasion and says that they had a plan to take down Wheatus but Laurel wrecked it last night. So he and Laurel must stay out of it. Isenstadt is in league with Wheatus.
12	"Talking Points Toward a Wholistic View of Activism in Government: Can the Top Rebel?"	Felix Alcala	Larry Kaplow	September 11, 2016	2.37
Luke orders Laurel to let the CIA handle the bugs. Gustav doesn't trust the CIA and still wants to murder Senator Wheatus. Laurel can't agree to this and accepts a $2 million donation from The Ocean League to finish her documentary in the Solomon Islands. After Laurel resigns and tells Gareth she is leaving in a week, he turns up at her office drunk and proposes. Senator Wheatus is really struggling because of the Queen’s injury. Luke outmaneuvers him and gets the budget vote delayed until tomorrow. Pollack thinks Wheatus is weak and wants to take over, but he refuses to stand aside. Luke's team finds funding for much glass hidden in the budget footnotes so Laurel visits an internment camp and finds hothouses for growing cherry blossoms. Pollack hires an assassin to kill Gareth to stop him helping Wheatus. Gareth is stabbed in the shoulder but fights off his attacker. Laurel rushes to his bedside and asks him to come with her, but he won't be a kept man in a hut. Luke goes to the CIA with the new information but is told to butt out again. He stands up to Isenstadt and tries to separate the farm provision from the budget. When this fails he starts a sit-in. Pollack confronts Wheatus and forces the Queen out of him at gunpoint then tries to shoot him. But she left the safety on so Wheatus disarms her and shoots her dead. The Queen bug chops up the fleeing King bug. A resurgent Wheatus confronts Luke and cuts off the C-SPAN feed of the sit-in. Inspired by her brother’s stand, Laurel takes him a phone to Periscope the sit-in. Laurel goes to Gareth's office and kisses him telling him she is not going to run away from the end of the world, and then to Rochelle and Gustav and tells them she knows the bugs plan and how to stop it.
13	"The End of All We Hold Dear: What Happens When Democracies Fail: A Brief Synopsis"	Robert King	Jacquelyn Reingold & Jonathan Tolins	September 11, 2016	2.06
Laurel figured out the clock was for the end of the cherry blossoms the bugs need. Gareth steals a security pass so that Gustav and Rochelle can salt the cherry tree seedlings at the camp but they flee when they bump into Anthony. Isenstadt threatens Luke with his father testifying he leaked. When Laurel tries to shame him out of testifying a bug leaves his ear. So she shows him a home video of her parents arguing after he missed her 9th birthday causing him to collapse and his bugs to leave. Wheatus fails to shoot Luke. Rochelle and Gustav try to fertilize DC’s cherry trees with ammonium nitrate to make them shed their blossoms, but they are stopped by the police and Anthony shows up to question them. Gustav turns out to be an NSA Agent and gets rid of them. Wheatus and Isenstadt blackmail Luke into letting budget pass with a sex tape Scarlett gave them, but Luke managed to divert the funding from the hothouses to a motor helmet law. Gareth has noticed that Wheatus is always getting Laurel’s name wrong because she looks like his first love Lana. Laurel tries to use this to shame Wheatus but he pulls his gun. Gareth enters and grapples with Wheatus, who is shot in the buttock. The Queen flees Wheatus and is stepped on by the intern. All the bugs panic and leave their hosts to pile onto their dead Queen. Gareth and Laurel move in together and she leaves politics to work on her documentary. The politicians, including Wheatus, with a half-a-brain continue their careers unimpeded. Luke goes into finance and Laurel works for him during the next big crash. Their father succumbs to Parkinson’s.

== Broadcast ==
The series premiered in Australia on Monday June 20, 2016, on Eleven, part of the Ten network.

== Reception ==
On Rotten Tomatoes, the series holds a 65% approval rating based on 49 critics. The site's critical consensus reads: "While admittedly uneven, BrainDead remains a charmingly idealistic sign of the political times". On Metacritic, the show holds a 61 out of 100 score based on 37 reviews, indicating "generally favorable reviews".

On its cancellation, Robert King, the show's creator said, "It was a show that was trying to be as weird and anti-network as could be, and it was probably a mistake to do that on a network. But I loved that show."

== See also ==
- Reptilian conspiracy theory—About shapeshifting reptilian aliens who control Earth by taking on human form
