= List of The Good Fight episodes =

The Good Fight is an American legal drama produced for CBS's streaming service CBS All Access (later Paramount+). It is the platform's first original scripted series. The series, created by Robert King, Michelle King, and Phil Alden Robinson, is a spin-off and sequel to The Good Wife, which was created by the Kings. The first season premiered on February 19, 2017, with the first episode airing on CBS and the following episodes on CBS All Access.

On July 20, 2021, Paramount+ renewed the series for a sixth season. On May 27, 2022, it was announced that the sixth season will be the series' last; it premiered on September 8, 2022. During the course of the series, 60 episodes of The Good Fight were released over six seasons, between February 19, 2017, and November 10, 2022.

== Series overview ==
Season	Episodes	Originally released		
Season	Episodes	First released	Last released	Network
1	10	February 19, 2017	April 16, 2017	CBS All Access
2	13	March 4, 2018	May 27, 2018	CBS All Access
3	10	March 14, 2019	May 16, 2019	CBS All Access
4	7	April 9, 2020	May 28, 2020	CBS All Access
5	10	June 24, 2021	August 26, 2021	Paramount+
6	10	September 8, 2022	November 10, 2022	Paramount+

== Episodes ==
=== Season 1 (2017) ===
No. overall	No. in season	Title	Directed by	Written by	Original release date
1	1	"Inauguration"	Brooke Kennedy	Phil Alden Robinson and Robert King & Michelle King	February 19, 2017
Diane Lockhart, motivated by the inauguration of Donald Trump, plans for her retirement. Her goddaughter, Maia Rindell, secures an associate position at Diane's firm, having passed the bar examination. Maia accompanies Diane in the latter's final case regarding police brutality, going head-to-head with Adrian Boseman, a name partner of an African-American-owned firm, and Lucca Quinn, Diane's former employee. Maia's father, Henry Rindell, is arrested for orchestrating an elaborate Ponzi scheme, leaving Diane, one of his investors, broke and unable to follow through with her retirement. Having already signed an exit agreement with her firm, and having invited her colleagues and clients to invest in Henry's fund, she is unable to secure a job at any other firm. To prevent hers and her husband Kurt McVeigh's assets from being seized as evidence, she is advised to divorce Kurt, given their separation after the discovery of his affair, but he refuses, still hoping for a reconciliation. Adrian offers Diane a junior partner position at his firm, which she accepts, and when Maia is fired in part due to her father's financial scandal, Diane brings her along.
2	2	"First Week"	Allan Arkush	Ryan Pedersen & Joey Scavuzzo	February 19, 2017
Hounded by her father's angry clients, Maia arrives at her new firm, meeting managing partner Julius Cain and third-year associate Lucca Quinn. Maia takes the case of Frank Gwynn, whose wages are being unfairly garnished by his employer after charges of theft. Diane is visited by Maia's mother Lenore, who asks Diane to meet with Henry; Lenore blames Jax, their business partner and Henry's brother. Maia loses her case in arbitration, but Lucca steps in to accuse the company of false imprisonment for detaining Frank over the theft. Lucca proposes the firm open a class action lawsuit for employees in Frank's predicament. Diane moves into her new office, assisted by Marissa Gold, who tracks down multiple employees to join the suit and becomes Diane's assistant. Diane meets Henry in jail, who claims that Jax framed him, and mentions that Lenore has terminal cancer. At Frank's trial, the prosecution uncovers evidence of theft at his previous job. Frank loses his case, and the firm pulls out of the suit. Maia discovers her mother lied about having cancer so Maia would visit. On Diane's advice, Maia returns to make amends with her mother but discovers her carrying on an affair with Jax.
3	3	"The Schtup List"	Marta Cunningham	Tegan Shohet	February 26, 2017
Barbara forces Diane and Lucca to work together on a case against assistant district attorney Colin Morello. The case involves a doctor who was arrested for performing surgery on a known terrorist. The partners have a meeting about their financial status, learning that a significant client has not paid that year's retainer, and fear he may move firms with Trump in office. The firm investigator introduces himself to Marissa, upset that she took it upon herself to round up the class action members. Maia visits her father in prison to warn him about her mother and Jax. The partners rush to find who in their office voted for Trump. Lucca has an unexpected run-in with Colin. Marissa works with the investigator to track down a crucial witness. The court rules in Diane and Lucca's favor, but the doctor is immediately arrested again. The partners make the individual who voted for Trump bid to the client. Maia visits her uncle and finds evidence that could help her father. The court case turns again when a terrorist on the most wanted list becomes involved.
4	4	"Henceforth Known as Property"	Alex Zakrzewski	Joey Hartstone	March 5, 2017
Strange comments in elevators make Maia suspicious. She and Marissa discover someone has made a fake Twitter profile for her. Diane handles a fertility case with a clinic that closed and donated 11 of 12 eggs for research. The 12th egg has been fertilized and is being prepped for implantation. Diane brings suit before that can happen. Mike Kresteva, the head of a task force hoping to curb police brutality, meets with Adrian. Diane warns Adrian that Kresteva is not always straightforward. Maia and Marissa track down an old boyfriend of Maia's, who they think is responsible for the Twitter impersonation. Adrian, Diane and Lucca are served with subpoenas to testify before a grand jury being prosecuted by Kresteva. At Lucca's request, Colin speaks with his boss about Kresteva. With Marissa's help, Maia finds a way to retaliate against her old boyfriend. The fertility case leads Diane and Barbara to bond for the first time, and Diane considers reaching out to Kurt. Kresteva is undeterred and pushes forward. The judge rules on the owner of the embryo.
5	5	"Stoppable: Requiem for an Airdate"	Ron Underwood	Marcus Dalzine	March 12, 2017
Adrian wants to take on another anti-Trump case, to attract clients from the entertainment industry. Kresteva approaches Maia about the fake news stories that were started about her. Surprisingly, he knows about Maia's visits to her father. Barbara asks Diane for her capital contribution, forcing Diane to reevaluate her expenses. Kurt visits Diane, who helps him rewrite public remarks and supports him by attending the speech. The firm's partners interview attorneys to defend them against Kresteva. Lucca suggests Adrian employ an unorthodox lawyer. Diane runs into Neil Gross, who has some interesting news for her. Kresteva visits the prison, and soon after, Henry is out on bail. Maia happily meets him at home until she sees her parents acting as if nothing has happened. Later, an attorney makes her question whether her father would turn on her. A potential attorney for the firm confronts Kresteva, then again in a very personal way that scares him. Colin stops by the courtroom to see Lucca in action. The two of them finally go on their date, where Lucca opens up about Alicia.
6	6	"Social Media and Its Discontents"	Jim McKay	Robert King & Michelle King	March 19, 2017
Neil Gross puts the firm to work to remove hate speech, and the online users responsible, from his websites, an assignment Maia takes personally. Colin talks to his supervisor again about Kresteva. Marissa considers becoming an investigator. Maia's uncle warns her that her father is up to something, and she reaches out to Elsbeth for advice. Things heat up between Colin and Lucca until he asks her to dinner. After the firm implements an appeals process for banned users, one user has a field day presenting his narrative. Information from the firm's discussions about the appeals process is leaked, which users use to their advantage. Lucca arranges a date so she can run into Colin, but without the results she expects. She confronts him later and is surprised again. Maia shows up for a meeting with her father and finds a party in progress, and is nervous when he tries to speak with her in private. Marissa steps in when the investigator needs help tracking down a specific kind of online user, and discovers her talent for investigating. Elsbeth warns the firm about the newest fake news story. Julius makes a surprising decision about his future with the firm.
7	7	"Not So Grand Jury"	So Yong Kim	William Finkelstein	March 26, 2017
Lucca tells Maia about Colin's warning. Kresteva introduces his case to a Grand Jury. Evidence is seized from Elsbeth's office. Henry is approached by Kresteva about Maia lying to him. Henry wants to talk to his daughter and the two of them finally have an honest conversation. Elsbeth figures out a strategy and tries to get the firm on board. Mike scrambles to change course. The investigator takes a look at the schtup list Henry asked Maia to get for him. Colin is asked to represent Kresteva in a civil lawsuit brought by the firm. Things get awkward when Lucca takes second chair. The firm investigates and discovers who the real target of Kresteva's wrath is. Maia confronts her father about some new information. Colin and Lucca discuss the consequences of their relationship. Marissa and Jay analyze the schtup list, the former making a startling discovery. Diane faces her day in court but is surprised when an important witness' testimony is not what she is expecting.
8	8	"Reddick v Boseman"	Michael Zinberg	Keith Josef Adkins	April 2, 2017
Carl Reddick returns to the firm and immediately criticizes Adrian and Barbara's leadership. An old friend needs help with an eviction and Diane steps up. Lucca and Colin make plans at an art gallery where they run into an unexpected woman. What was supposed to be a simple eviction goes in a completely different direction when Diane shows up at Paul Johnson's door and he makes some shocking allegations, and his attorney contacts the firm. Marissa helps Jay investigate the allegations and finally wins him over. Henry tries to talk to Maia, calling her and Amy multiple times and even showing up at the office. Worried, Maia and Amy rush to find him. Lucca joins Colin at a birthday party. Things get complicated fast and Lucca bolts, as she tends to do. Maia is upset when Henry ends up in the hospital and Lenore shows up with Jax. Diane goes toe-to-toe with Paul's attorney until Marissa and Jay find the evidence they need to expose him. The firm votes on who should be managing partner – Carl or Adrian. Lucca makes a decision about her relationship with Colin.
9	9	"Self Condemned"	Jim McKay	William M. Finkelstein	April 9, 2017
Lucca and Maia have a meeting with the FBI. Maia has offered to tell them everything she knows about the Ponzi scheme as long as she's granted immunity. Diane and Adrian get wind of a new police brutality case but are surprised when they see the victim. Maia works with the FBI agent to recover memories from her teenage years that may shed light on who is behind the scheme. Diane and Adrian's victim is having a hard time finding sympathy in the justice system given his criminal history. Jay finds evidence to show that the police officer has a history of bad conduct. Maia struggles to remember key moments in her life and possibly the Ponzi scheme. Diane and Adrian grow closer as friends and colleagues. Lucca offers guidance as Maia is confronted with uncomfortable truths about her past.
10	10	"Chaos"	Robert King	Robert King & Michelle King	April 16, 2017
The time for bi-annual reviews arrives at Reddick, Boseman & Kolstad. Lucca gets good news while Maia has some mixed reviews. Diane gets a call that Kurt has been in an accident. A former client, Dylan Stack, returns. Henry meets with the Department of Justice but is not offered the deal he was hoping for. He reaches out to a mysterious old friend for help. The firm finds out about a potential attack on the power grid and goes to the DOJ looking for immunity. Things go awry when Lucca is arrested. Maia wants to be more assertive and picks a partner to shadow for the day. Colin tries to resign but ends up being promoted. Marissa works with Jay to find the real person behind the cyber terrorism, and he continues to be impressed by her investigative skills. Mr. Staples returns to cause more destruction. The city of Chicago has a blackout. Maia, Lenore and Henry enjoy a last meal together as a family, at least for a while. Diane and Kurt reconcile. Maia's dad flees after agreeing to a 35-year plea deal, and Maia is arrested in connection with the Ponzi scheme.

=== Season 2 (2018) ===
No. overall	No. in season	Title	Directed by	Written by	Original release date
11	1	"Day 408"	Brooke Kennedy	Robert King & Michelle King	March 4, 2018
After founding partner Carl Reddick dies, the partners work to ensure that all their clients remain on board and are surprised when they learn that a lucrative project involving the Obamas is in jeopardy after his death. At the end of her tether with politics and professional strains, and feeling her mortality following the deaths of several Chicago lawyers, Diane accepts the offer of psilocybin from a bartender, and starts microdosing to relax. Justice Department lawyer Liz Reddick, Reddick's daughter and Boseman's ex-wife, leaves her job at the Department of Justice after she tweets a criticism of Donald Trump, and is criticized for it. To preclude Liz taking the Reddick name away and becoming a competitor, Diane recruits her to the firm. Maia learns some surprising facts about her father's past.
12	2	"Day 415"	Jim McKay	William Finkelstein	March 11, 2018
Another Chicago lawyer is murdered, causing tensions at Reddick Boseman. Liz has her first day at Reddick, Boseman & Lockhart and goes for a drink with Diane, where Diane confides that she feels as if she is going insane with all the problems of the world. Maia's trial takes an unwelcome turn when a surprise witness is called to testify against her. Lucca and Colin go head-to-head in court in the Rindell trial.
13	3	"Day 422"	James Whitmore Jr.	Joey Hartstone	March 18, 2018
Marissa and Maia open an envelope addressed to Diane, only to find a letter reading "Kill all lawyers" and a sample of deadly ricin. Diane fears she is the next target, causing her to microdose even more. Alone at home, she watches TV, only to find that every single channel is about Trump. She hears a story about the president adopting a pot-bellied pig named Petey. The firm represents a young woman who was assaulted while a contestant on a reality dating show. In court, Diane starts laughing hysterically. Adrian asks her how she is coping, after Liz told him that Diane is thinking of quitting the law, due to her inability to process the constant barrage of current events.
14	4	"Day 429"	Ron Underwood	Jonathan Tolins	March 25, 2018
Liz learns that her son's favorite teacher has been fired from his charter school. The case goes to arbitration, and though Liz initially suspects racism, she learns the firing has more to do with standardized test scores and that the teacher was the only one who did not inflate his students' scores. Lucca learns her younger brother is in trouble with the law again, and is surprised to learn it is because he has created an app to help convicts with their appeals process. After a party, Diane believes that she is going insane after she sleeps with the bartender. She tearfully collapses into Kurt's arms, repeatedly apologizing to him but not saying what she has done, out of fear that he will leave her forever. Kurt tells her that he does not want to remain separated anymore, and is ready to move back in with her.
15	5	"Day 436"	Jim McKay	Marcus Dalzine	April 1, 2018
Lucca and Maia are assigned separate ride-alongs with the police. Lucca's night turns surprisingly eventful after she realizes that the person behind a DUI is Francesa Lovatelli, Colin's mother. She calls Colin to the police station. There, Lucca tells him that she is 3 months pregnant with his child. Diane and Adrian advise clients who are about to be sued over running a story about sexual harassment. In the course of the case, Adrian bumps into a former student and is surprised by what she tells him about himself.
16	6	"Day 443"	Brooke Kennedy	Jacquelyn Reingold	April 8, 2018
Adrian becomes a minor celebrity by appearing as a pundit on a local talk show, but his tenure on air is short-lived. Lucca officially informs the partners of her pregnancy, and insists it will not impact her work. Lucca and Colin argue over the start date for a trial after Colin moves for a continuance to the week of Lucca's due date.
17	7	"Day 450"	Frederick E.O. Toye	Tegan Shohet	April 15, 2018
Ruth Eastman, a Democratic National Committee consultant, films the firm's partners in highly confidential all-day sessions to find a law firm to take on the party's efforts to impeach Donald Trump should the Democrats take control of Congress. Liz and Diane's emotions run high, and their enthusiasm resonates with the DNC, who ultimately appoint Liz as co-counsel in any future proceedings. Diane argues with Julius, saying that the last few months have left her feeling deranged, as she is incapable of dealing with Trump. She angrily says that she has a gun in her desk and is very close to taking it to the streets. Adrian tries to talk to Diane, but they are interrupted by Liz. Marissa has bought a pack of cards from an Alt-Right website, which is called the Kill All The Lawyers Deck, featuring Chicago lawyers who are expected to be killed. Adrian, Liz and Diane are all on them. Maia is seduced by Ruth's assistant Carrine and cheats on Amy. They sneak back to the office to have sex and are unwittingly caught on tape by the DNC's cameras.
18	8	"Day 457"	Clark Johnson	Aurin Squire	April 22, 2018
The firm sues the Chicago Police Department for the shooting of a black undercover cop by his white colleague. Kurt's ballistics evidence paints an open-and-shut case, but the defence uses dirty tactics – including micro-targeting jurors with fake news about the plaintiff and his legal team via Facebook – to avoid a payout. Diane's marriage to Kurt is also tested as the defense exploits Kurt's affair and subsequent lies to Diane to undermine both Diane and the firm's evidence. While investigating a separate case for Jay's friend Craig, Maia and Lucca determine that Diane's client and his shooter worked together as crooked cops, planting guns to frame at least 30 suspects, including Jay's friend. The firm is offered a significant payout from the Chicago PD to stop the reopening of these cases, but amid the celebrations, Jay quits as lead investigator after the firm chooses the Chicago PD settlement over justice for Craig.
19	9	"Day 464"	Michael Zinberg	Robert King & Michelle King	April 29, 2018
The firm is contacted by Dominika, a student who fears she is being deported to Russia because she is one of the prostitutes from the golden shower tape mentioned in the Steele dossier, and her existence would prove that Vladimir Putin has compromising material on President Trump. Maia and Lucca bend ethical rules to support Craig's lawyer, but even with coaching he proves too inept to get the job done. When a white supremacist becomes the Republican Congressional candidate for Illinois's 1st congressional district, greater attention falls on Colin's campaign to become the Democratic candidate. The Democrats are concerned that Colin's prosecutorial history appears racially biased. Lucca suggests he use an investigation into police corruption to overturn several black convictions and change his statistics, and as a result, Craig's sentence is vacated. The FBI offer Dominika a deal, allowing her to stay in the U.S. if she admits the tape is a fake.
20	10	"Day 471"	Kevin Rodney Sullivan	William Finkelstein	May 6, 2018
Boseman is shot by an unseen assailant from the office elevator, prompting Liz to illegally hand over the firm's client list to her husband, CPD Captain Lawrence, who immediately goes after two of Diane's longstanding clients: Chicago drug lord Lemond Bishop, and wealthy killer Colin Sweeney. With the firm reeling from the attack, Diane's white shoe firm rival Solomon attempts to poach her clients, sharpening Diane's sense of purpose. She vows to make her corner of the world sane again, throws away her psychedelics and begins to retake control. She takes the fight to Solomon, winning back her clients and taking one of his; the Cook County Democrats. Jay returns to the fold when he learns of Boseman's injury. He and Marissa create a short list of angry ex-clients who might be responsible for the attack. Colin Morello is selected as the Democratic candidate for congressman in Illinois's 1st district.
21	11	"Day 478"	Brooke Kennedy	Jonathan Tolins	May 13, 2018
The firm challenges a gossip website that shames men accused of non-criminal sexual impropriety, stirring debate within the office. Jay is formally rehired by Diane but struggles to reconcile their evidence about Boseman's shooter with the police's suspect profile; he determines that the shooter was Whitehead, the crooked cop who helped frame his friend Craig, and he is arrested. With firms in DC anticipating Colin's election, Lucca receives offers of employment, including an invitation to work for the Obamas. Diane learns her finances have made a full recovery, in part due to Trump's tax reliefs for the already-wealthy. Diane studies aikido in an attempt to calm herself. She asks Kurt whether or not he wants a divorce, and he says that they have never tried properly being married. He has taken a job with the FBI in Chicago and wants to move in with Diane, full-time. Diane accepts enthusiastically, and they kiss, just as Adrian returns to the office. He gives a speech about how Reddick, Boseman & Lockhart is a family and all stick up for one another.
22	12	"Day 485"	Ron Underwood	Jacquelyn Reingold & Marcus Dalzine	May 20, 2018
Jay is arrested for driving while black and immigration officers descend on his bail hearing to deport him to Nigeria. To shield him from federal powers under states' rights (Illinois is a sanctuary state), his sympathetic bail judge agrees to hold Jay in state court while the firm investigates. They learn that Jay's U.S. birth certificate is fake and that he was born in Nigeria and moved to the states as a baby. Citing Jay's artwork as grounds for an "Einstein" visa, as well as the fact that First Lady Melania Trump was granted one for her nude modelling, the firm helps him avoid deportation. One of Julius' Republican connections offers to make Jay's problem go away in exchange for taking Diane's blue chip tech giant client ChumHum to a Republican-backed firm, hoping ChumHum can help them hurt the Democrats. He is rebuffed, leading him to threaten Julius with open war against his firm on behalf of the Republicans and federal government.
23	13	"Day 492"	Robert King	Robert & Michelle King	May 27, 2018
Diane is hounded by FBI officials over her connections to Tully – a radical left-wing activist she had been sleeping with – and her previous filmed remarks about President Trump on the DNC audition tapes. Diane thinks she is being bugged, after the prosecutor plays a tape of her and Tully talking in her bedroom. The FBI interrogate Kurt about the gun he gave Diane, ostensibly as part of his background check. Proving his love and loyalty to Diane, he orders them out of his house, but not before Patrick Baseheart tells him Diane will be indicted. It becomes clear the federal government are set on prosecuting her to make an example of the firm. Fighting fire with fire, Boseman leaks false information to a Fox News journalist concerning a porn star who slept with the President, alleging she instead was having an affair with the federal prosecutor targeting Diane; the President, who reliably watches Fox & Friends, will be sure to fire him via a tweet within minutes. Lucca gives birth to a healthy baby boy, who she names Joseph Quinn-Morrello, but her mother sows seeds of doubt in her mind about Colin.

=== Season 3 (2019) ===
No. overall	No. in season	Title	Directed by	Written by	Original release date
24	1	"The One About the Recent Troubles"	Robert King	Robert King & Michelle King	March 14, 2019
While interviewing law firm employees for a documentary on the deceased Carl Reddick, previous acts of sexual assault against the secretarial staff by Reddick are revealed. The firm is able to settle on both counts. covering up Reddick's crimes. Diane, having reconciled with Kurt, finds her happiness threatened when she begins to suspect Kurt of cheating again, but it turns out he is working for Eric Trump and Donald Trump Jr. Diane resumes investigating the extra-marital affairs of Donald Trump in hopes of finding something with which to impeach him. However, Tara, a porn star who claims to have had an affair with Trump, refuses to come forward out of fear of reprisals, so Diane reveals her story to a reporter. Maia begins acting out after she is photoshopped out of a picture of female employees for the website. The firm is forced to acknowledge their role in shutting down a feminist blog that names and shames men accused of sexual harassment.
25	2	"The One Inspired by Roy Cohn"	Frederick E. O. Toye	William Finkelstein	March 21, 2019
Maia clashes with a new character, lawyer Roland Blum. When he threatens to frame Maia for possession of narcotics, she argues for a separate trial for her client from Blum and his client. However, the judge refuses to allow this. The firm struggles to find someone to run the divorce and family law department, with Liz asking Lucca to take the position. Lucca agrees, after much soul searching about the fact that it will require her to spend less time with her newborn child and after using dirt on the other candidate from Marissa, to force her hiring. Kurt reveals that the Trump brothers got him a new job at the Bureau of Veterans Affairs in Chicago. Diane takes up hatchet throwing. Tara, the porn star who claimed Trump paid her to have an abortion, confronts Diane for leaking the story of her abortion after being told she would not come forward. Diane lies to Tara and the story goes public.
26	3	"The One Where Diane Joins the Resistance"	Brooke Kennedy	Jonathan Tolins	March 28, 2019
Diane joins an "anti-Trump resistance" meeting, being recruited by Valerie Peyser into a cabal of like-minded wealthy professional women. Liz's divorce goes to trial, with Lucca as her lawyer. Maia is bullied by Blum into demanding her own office so he can work in private. When Blum fails to show up at court, Maia cuts a deal with the DA. When an angry Blum confronts Maia, she refuses to back down. Julius prepares to run for a state judgeship, recruiting Marissa to help him select a campaign manager.
27	4	"The One with Lucca Becoming a Meme"	Nelson McCormick	Jacquelyn Reingold	April 4, 2019
Lucca is stalked and harassed by a white woman in the park, who accuses her of having kidnapped her own child. The incident is filmed and goes viral. While discussing the incident, Jay reveals to Lucca that the firm has been paying its recently hired white employees more than its black employees. After unsuccessfully confronting Adrian, Jay sends a company-wide email revealing the pay discrepancy, creating chaos. The partners are pressured into firing Maia over her drugs charge, to achieve the appearance of racial equality. Julius is interviewed by a right wing think tank who may support his campaign to become a state judge. However, the think tank refuses to endorse unless Julius fires Marissa and Julius declines their endorsement. Liz is brought into Diane's resistance group as the group demands Diane get one of the firm's clients, an apolitical country singer, to denounce Trump and the Alt-right. Diane's group ultimately forces their target to come out against the Alt-right by outing her sister as transgender, then sending death threats to her while pretending to be members of the Alt-right. Diane and Liz are shocked, as the group took this move without informing them of their intentions.
28	5	"The One Where a Nazi Gets Punched"	Jim McKay	Tegan Shohet	April 11, 2019
Lucca and Jay are sent to a rural town in Illinois to serve as Democratic monitors for a local election, which has been subject to accusations of voter intimidation. Lucca and Jay immediately clash with their Republican counterparts, until they encounter a third group of "monitors" in the form of a group called "The Red Jackets." These begin intimidating people in line, spurring Jay to call in a reporter to try to scare them off. Ultimately the Democrats and Republicans work together against the Red Jackets. Diane and Adrien are forced to contend with Blum when a client, a DNA Ancestry firm, is accused of selling people's DNA information to insurance companies so they can deny coverage to patients based on genetic/family based illnesses. The settlement involves letting Blum work at their offices. Maia, seeking employment, follows up several leads from Diane, but they prove empty and she angrily rejects Diane and Lucca.
29	6	"The One with the Celebrity Divorce"	Tess Malone	Davita Scarlett	April 18, 2019
Diane's anti-Trump group, now calling itself "The Book Club", find their recent cyber-harassment bearing fruit in terms of harming Trump's polling numbers. Blum moves into the law firm's office and Marissa is told to follow him. Lucca meets a new client, who turns out to be a hairstylist for a secret client looking for Lucca's help with a post-nup. The client turns out to be Melania Trump but the firm believes she may be a fake, in an effort to retrieve the "pee tape" (see "Day 464") from the firm. After much back and forth, Lucca is able to meet "Melania", who states that she has changed her mind about the divorce, citing her Catholic faith and admiration for Jackie Kennedy. It is left unclear whether it was the real Melania Trump.
30	7	"The One Where Diane and Liz Topple Democracy"	Brooke Kennedy	Aurin Squire	April 25, 2019
Roland Blum brings in actor Gary Carr of Downton Abbey to get experience in a law firm for a film role, but hides his status as an actor. After this is revealed he and Lucca clash, but she eventually lets him follow her for the role and their relationship takes a romantic turn. A member of Diane and Liz's "book club" brings them a case involving malfunctioning voting machines in the 2016 presidential election. The club debates using the machine's software on the Democratic side of the election to make up for votes changed to Republican, with Diane firmly against this plan. Adrian is told the case's adjudicator is on the take; however, his confrontation with the judge causes her to rule against the plaintiff and dismiss the case with prejudice. After the court result, Diane is enthusiastically behind the plan to change votes.
31	8	"The One Where Kurt Saves Diane"	Felix Alcala	Laura Marks	May 2, 2019
When ChumHum, a major technology company and Reddick, Boseman & Lockhart client, is sued by Felix Staples over having censored his videos from their search results, Staples' lawyer reveals that ChumHum was testing a new censorship algorithm they were creating for China. The firm fails to successfully defend ChumHum and then tells them the truth about the firm's founder being a sexual predator out of fear that Blum might reveal the scandal. ChumHum informs the firm that they may sever ties over the impending scandal. Kurt stumbles upon a note from a disillusioned NSA agent spying on Diane, warning her off the planned hack of voting machines. Diane finds out about the note, but a text from Valerie convinces the "Book Club" to continue with the plan. After Kurt discovers the identity of the NSA agent, he solves the issue by contacting the elections board and having them retire the machines, supposedly on orders from Donald Trump Jr., which prevents the hack; when the NSA agent attempts to destroy all audio recordings of Diane talking about the plot, a newly hired agent catches him deleting the files, but he still manages to delete them. Lucca struggles with her feelings for Gary Carr as he continues to shadow her at work.
32	9	"The One Where the Sun Comes Out"	Brooke Kennedy	Eric Holmes	May 9, 2019
To save their relationship with ChumHum, Reddick, Boseman & Lockhart agrees to undergo a third-party audit to determine if they correctly handled the revelation that Liz's father, the firm's founder, was a sexual predator. The auditor agrees to clear the firm even though she discovers that Marissa and Liz are covering up additional incidents of rape committed by Liz's father. Diane and Liz are expelled from "The Book Club" when they discover the group is now planning to swat a Trump official involved in the administration's immigration detention policy. The group threatens Diane if she tries to stop them, and the official is later killed in a SWAT raid. Reddick, Boseman & Lockhart loses ChumHum as its client, as Blum goes public with the scandal to try to bring down the firm. Maia has Blum's allegations confirmed in conversation with Marissa, but she fails to testify at his disbarment. Reddick, Boseman & Lockhart is censured for the cover-up of Liz's father's crimes but Blum is disbarred in the state of Illinois and he vows revenge on the firm.
33	10	"The One About the End of the World"	Brooke Kennedy	William Finkelstein & Jonathan Tolins	May 16, 2019
Kurt is asked to give a public speech praising Trump during an upcoming visit to Chicago, but he is not sufficiently fawning, so Diane ghost-writes it for him. She later watches Kurt being removed from camera view for not clapping enthusiastically enough when Trump speaks at the rally. Blum attempts to exact revenge on Reddick, Boseman & Lockhart, with Maia suing them on behalf of a client who claims they overcharged him on legal fees on his settlement in a police brutality case. When Diane learns the judge trying the case has a learning disability, she has the firm's expert witnesses at the trial use animal-themed graphs and ASMR-style presentations to reach him. But fearing that Maia could win the case, Diane tempts her to change sides with the offer of a 5-year partnership. The firm wins the case, and Diane is rebuffed by Maia, who reveals that she and Blum are relocating to Washington, D.C. Marissa and Jay confront the new head of "The Book Club", who realizes that Diane is trying to stop the group from killing another government official. Later, a SWAT team is seen entering Diane and Kurt's apartment.

=== Season 4 (2020) ===
No. overall	No. in season	Title	Directed by	Written by	Original release date
34	1	"The Gang Deals with Alternate Reality"	Brooke Kennedy	Robert King & Michelle King	April 9, 2020
In an alternate reality, Diane is delighted that Hillary Clinton has beaten Donald Trump in the 2016 United States presidential election and is now serving as the 45th President of the United States. However, she quickly discovers that this alternative world is not the paradise she hoped it would be when she realizes that the #MeToo movement does not exist and Harvey Weinstein is still a respected movie producer. Diane becomes increasingly disoriented, and finally regains consciousness in her swatted apartment.
35	2	"The Gang Tries to Serve a Subpoena"	Kevin Rodney Sullivan	Jonathan Tolins	April 16, 2020
Diane decides to defend a restaurant owner whose business is under threat from a wealthy developer. Julius is handed a mysterious memo during his first case as a federal judge. Reddick, Boseman and Lockhart adjust to their new environment as a subsidiary of the enormous, multinational law firm STR Laurie. Lucca gets close to her client during a high profile divorce case.
36	3	"The Gang Gets a Call from HR"	Tess Malone	Davita Scarlett	April 30, 2020
When the DNC asks Reddick, Boseman and Lockhart to help the party engage African American voters ahead of the 2020 General election, the firm falls into a tense debate around the topic of reparations. Someone reports Adrian to human resources after he uses sensitive language. Diane becomes determined to find out what "Memo 618" is.
37	4	"The Gang Is Satirized and Doesn't Like It"	Nelson McCormick	William Finkelstein	May 7, 2020
When a disgruntled employee writes a crude play inspired by Reddick, Boseman and Lockhart, Adrian becomes determined to stifle its growing popularity. Diane investigates STR Laurie's involvement with Memo 618.
38	5	"The Gang Goes to War"	James Whitmore Jr.	Tegan Shohet	May 14, 2020
Liz and Caleb defend a whistleblower in military court who testified against his superior. Lucca flies to St. Lucia to meet Bianca. Diane continues her investigation into Memo 618 despite bumps in the road.
39	6	"The Gang Offends Everyone"	Brooke Kennedy	Jacquelyn Reingold	May 21, 2020
Adrian receives an alluring offer from the DNC. Diane and Julius confront the mystery man who has been threatening them. Diane is able to track down Linda, a court stenographer who has figured out the purpose of Memo 618.
40	7	"The Gang Discovers Who Killed Jeffrey Epstein"	Fred Murphy	Laura Marks	May 28, 2020
At the request of the U.S. Attorney, Reddick, Boseman and Lockhart investigate the death of Jeffrey Epstein and examine the conspiracies relating to his life. Liz, Marissa and team toil between the evidence that it was a suicide, or a murder. Ultimately, it is the perfect example of Memo 618 in action. The name partners realize their overseer at STR Laurie is one step ahead.

=== Season 5 (2021) ===
No. overall	No. in season	Title	Directed by	Written by	Original release date
41	1	"Previously On..."	Brooke Kennedy	Robert King & Michelle King	June 24, 2021
Structured as a series of extended recap sequences, RBL deals with the fallout of the COVID-19 pandemic and the George Floyd protests. Diane is retained to argue in front of the Supreme Court, but is dismayed when Ruth Bader Ginsburg dies. Adrian leaves the firm, ultimately deciding to move to Atlanta rather than pursue politics. Jay hallucinates Frederick Douglass and others while hospitalized with COVID-19. Bianca sends Lucca to London for negotiations, and ultimately hires her away from RBL. Marissa decides to become a lawyer, and is enrolled at Chicago-Kent with the help of Lucca and Bianca.
42	2	"Once There Was a Court..."	Michael Trim	Jonathan Tolins	July 1, 2021
Reddick, Lockhart, and Associates welcomes a group of new hires. Diane and Marissa deal with an arbitration case in front of the quirky "Judge" Wackner, a Chicago copy shop owner who has created his own low-cost arbitration service in his warehouse, purporting to be a court. The firm's client, convicted murderer Oscar Rivi, takes a shine to new associate Carmen Moyo, whose willingness to skirt ethical boundaries concerns Liz.
43	3	"And the Court Had a Clerk..."	Tyne Rafaeli	William Finkelstein	July 8, 2021
Liz sues Chumhum over an online review libel case, bankrolled by David Cord, a conservative that wants to challenge Section 230 of the Communications Decency Act. Diane discovers that Kurt trained one of the Capitol attackers; her attempt to tip off the FBI anonymously to the attacker's identity leads to an investigation by Starkey. Marissa takes a part-time job as a law clerk for Wackner, who later hires Diane, over her objections, to help legitimize his "court". Carmen agrees to represent an accused rapist and fellow inmate of Rivi; the partners object but are overruled by David, who reveals he now oversees the firm on behalf of STR Laurie.
44	4	"And the Clerk Had a Firm..."	James Whitmore Jr.	Jacquelyn Reingold	July 15, 2021
Rivi's criminal associate Charles Lester tips off Diane, via Carmen Moyo, that she and Kurt are about to be indicted. At a grand jury hearing, Diane's anonymous call to the FBI is revealed, driving a wedge between her and Kurt, who fires her as his lawyer in favour of Julius. Liz attempts to get a hold of Moyo's relationship with Rivi. Wackner's court receives generous funding from David Cord, who is keen to use it to disrupt the legal system.
45	5	"And the Firm Had Two Partners..."	Nikki M. James	Davita Scarlett	July 22, 2021
Jay's memories of his time in a COVID ward help the firm prove that the hospital was discriminating in the care given to its non-white patients in a case for Oscar Rivi. When the hospital's lawyer makes a remark about Rivi's deaf wife, he is beaten to a pulp in the middle of a taped deposition. Kurt refuses to give the FBI names of shooting colleagues who could help his case for fear of embroiling them in a witchhunt. None are willing to come forward of their own accord, until Diane discovers one of them is the author of a far-right, seditionist manifesto, and threatens her with revealing it. The FBI case falls apart.
46	6	"And the Two Partners Had a Fight..."	Brooke Kennedy	Aurin Squire	July 29, 2021
The firm adopts a new Slack-like work app which leads to anonymous bitching about the partners, and most of all Diane: the white name partner of a black law firm, whose husband is a staunch Republican whose hunting buddies included white supremacist rioters. Liz suggests to Diane that she willingly step back, but after some soul-searching and dreams about Ruth Bader Ginsburg, Diane decides to fight for her name above the door. She tells her top clients she is being asked to step back, who in turn raise their discomfort with STR Laurie; David Lee instructs Liz that Diane (the firm's top biller and biggest client draw) must remain as name partner. Liz feels stung by Diane's manoeuvre. Wackner is dragged to court to defend the legitimacy of his wacky arbitration service, about which a new streaming show is in development. Although minded to dismiss the claim against Wackner, the judge entertains a longer trial when Wackner's famous funder, conservative David Cord, is revealed. The case is suddenly dropped when the claimant is spontaneously beaten up outside his home.
47	7	"And the Fight Had a Détente..."	Carrie Preston	Tegan Shohet	August 5, 2021
In Wackner's court a case is tried where Joey Battle, a comedian, is accused of inappropriate sexual behavior toward fellow comic June. She claims her career declined after addressing it, but evidence attributes it to poor performances. Battle collaborates with Del Cooper to revive his career. Marissa confronts Wackner and everyone involved upon discovery question his integrity, resulting in her expulsion. Battle insists he has changed, but recent footage disproves this. Wackner finds Battle guilty and sentences him to three weeks in a private prison owned by David Cord. Professor Henrietta Michaels, a white academic, is fired after using the term niggardly. After hearing from both sides, Wackner rules the term was "awful but lawful". Diane and Liz represent the family of a Black woman who died after Officer McFinley, a white cop, used a stun gun unaware she had a pacemaker. McFinley is killed in apparent retaliation before the trial resumes. Concern about media bias leads to a judge-ordered voir dire de novo to reassess juror impartiality. Media-fueled controversy helps but leaves them just short until a fake story alleges a romantic relationship between them, which they use to dismiss a biased juror, resulting in a mistrial.
48	8	"And the Détente Had an End..."	Michael Zinberg	Laura Marks	August 12, 2021
Julius Cain visits Wackner's court to ask David Cord to sponsor a new law firm, expressing dissatisfaction with STR Laurie. Cord initially declines but agrees to consider if Diane also joins. As Julius leaves, his car is ticketed for parking in "court parking". After tearing up the tickets, Julius later finds his car towed. When city officials inform him that he must seek Wackner's permission to retrieve it, Julius confronts him and refuses to apologize. Attempting to take his car back, he steals a court parking sticker book and is arrested, ending up in Wackner's own court. He serves one day before being released. The incident creates media buzz, leading to Wackner's court being picked up for a TV pilot. Diane and Liz seek a new partner to balance the power at the firm. After a dream featuring Ruth Bader Ginsburg, Diane recalls Allegra Durado, a former Ginsburg clerk, and invites her to join. Although Diane hopes to gain an ally, Allegra chooses to remain neutral and accepts a position at the firm.
49	9	"And the End Was Violent..."	Brooke Kennedy	Eric Holmes	August 19, 2021
Police arrest a man for assaulting an Asian woman but due to overcrowded courts, he is taken to Wackner's court. Wackner sentences him to one year in David Cord's private prison to prevent further harm. Following this, officers begin referring other cases to Wackner for quicker processing. Drug lord Oscar Rivi partners with Plum Meadow Farms to create a cannabis-based product line. The deal falters when the farm raises concerns about Rivi's criminal past. Carmen intervenes to ease tensions, and Allegra proposes a compromise that leads to a preliminary agreement. Later, two boys caught dealing drugs are brought before Wackner's court and revealed to be working for Rivi. Believing the farm is responsible, Rivi retaliates by killing several of their cows. When Marissa informs Carmen that Wackner has detained Rivi's men, Rivi demands the release of all three, but Wackner clarifies only two are in custody. After a confrontation, he releases them while the firm searches for the missing third. Jay and Marissa locate the missing man, Matteo, held by Judge Vinetta, who runs her own version of Wackner's court. She refuses to release him, insisting they argue his case the next day.
50	10	"And the Violence Spread."	Robert King	Robert King & Michelle King	August 26, 2021
The bosses from STR Laurie arrive for a surprise visit, but cannot meet with Diane and Liz who are busy to retrieve Rivi's men from custody. Kurt, who is also waiting for Diane in the firm's office, builds up a connection with the bosses as all of them love golf and hunting. Wackner's court is wrecked when he decides against some people who want to split Illinois in two states and Wackner and Marissa have to hide from the attackers. Diane and Kurt spend a night in custody of Judge Vinetta and afterwards Diane decides to step down as name partner since she thinks that she cannot lead if no one wants to follow her.

=== Season 6 (2022) ===
No. overall	No. in season	Title	Directed by	Written by	Original release date
51	1	"The Beginning of the End"	Nelson McCormick	Robert King & Michelle King	September 8, 2022
52	2	"The End of the Yips"	Tyne Rafaeli	Jonathan Tolins	September 15, 2022
53	3	"The End of Football"	Nelson McCormick	Aurin Squire	September 22, 2022
54	4	"The End of Eli Gold"	James Whitmore Jr.	Davita Scarlett	September 29, 2022
55	5	"The End of Ginni"	Lily Mariye	Jacquelyn Reingold	October 6, 2022
56	6	"The End of a Saturday"	Michael Zinberg	Tegan Shohet	October 13, 2022
57	7	"The End of STR Laurie"	Nikki M. James	Daniel "Koa" Beaty	October 20, 2022
58	8	"The End of Playing Games"	Robert King	Jonathan Tolins & Anju Andre-Bergmann	October 27, 2022
59	9	"The End of Democracy"	Carrie Preston	Eric Holmes	November 3, 2022
60	10	"The End of Everything"	Robert King	Robert King & Michelle King	November 10, 2022
