= Inauguration (disambiguation) =

Inauguration is the process of swearing a person into office.

Inauguration may also refer to:

- "Inauguration" (The Good Fight)
- "Inauguration" (Stargate SG-1)
- "Inauguration" (Veep)
