= The Good Fight =

2017 American legal drama television series

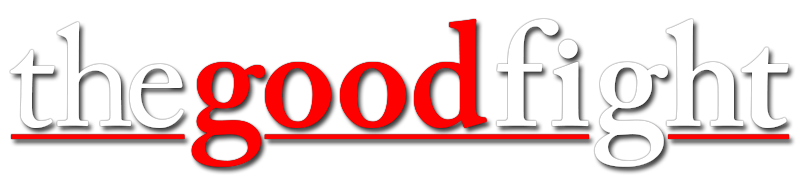
- Genre: Legal drama; Political drama
- Created by: Robert King; Michelle King; Phil Alden Robinson
- Starring: Christine Baranski; Rose Leslie; Erica Tazel; Cush Jumbo; Delroy Lindo; Sarah Steele; Justin Bartha; Nyambi Nyambi; Michael Boatman; Audra McDonald; Michael Sheen; Zach Grenier; John Larroquette; Charmaine Bingwa; Mandy Patinkin; John Slattery; Andre Braugher
- Composer: David Buckley
- Country of origin: United States
- Original language: English
- No. of seasons: 6
- No. of episodes: 60 (list of episodes)

Production
- Executive producers: Robert King; Michelle King; Phil Alden Robinson; Ridley Scott; David W. Zucker; Liz Glotzer; Brooke Kennedy; Alison Scott; William M. Finkelstein; Jacquelyn Reingold; Jonathan Tolins; Jordan Sheehan; Davita Scarlett; Aurin Squire; Nancy Hermann; Tegan Shohet; Alison Cross
- Running time: 49–55 minutes
- Production companies: Scott Free Productions; King Size Productions; CBS Studios

Original release
- Network: Paramount+ (Note: Known as "CBS All Access" from 2017–2020)
- Release: February 19, 2017 – November 10, 2022

Related
- The Good Wife; Elsbeth

The Good Fight is an American legal drama television series produced for CBS's streaming service CBS All Access (later Paramount+). It was the platform's first original scripted series. The series, created by Robert King, Michelle King, and Phil Alden Robinson, is a spin-off from and standalone sequel to The Good Wife, which was created by the Kings. The first season premiered on February 19, 2017, with the first episode airing on CBS and the following nine episodes on CBS All Access.

The series follows Christine Baranski as Diane Lockhart, as she loses her employment after an enormous financial scam destroys the reputation of her goddaughter Maia (Rose Leslie) and Diane's savings, leading them to join Lucca Quinn (Cush Jumbo) at one of Chicago's preeminent law firms. The series stars Baranski, Leslie, Jumbo, Erica Tazel, Sarah Steele, Justin Bartha, Delroy Lindo, Nyambi Nyambi, Michael Boatman, and Audra McDonald, and features Paul Guilfoyle and Bernadette Peters in recurring roles. It is executive produced by Robert King, Michelle King, Ridley Scott, David W. Zucker, Liz Glotzer, Brooke Kennedy and Alison Scott.

In July 2021, the series was renewed for a sixth and final season. It premiered on September 8, 2022.

== Premise ==
A year after the series finale of The Good Wife, an enormous financial scam destroys the reputation of young lawyer Maia Rindell and wipes out the savings of her mentor, Diane Lockhart. The two are forced out of Lockhart, Deckler, Gussman, Lee, Lyman, Gilbert-Lurie, Kagan, Tannebaum, & Associates and join Diane's former employee Lucca Quinn at Reddick, Boseman, & Kolstad, a prestigious African American–owned firm making waves by taking on Illinois police brutality cases. In season two, Diane becomes a named partner at the firm, which takes the name Reddick, Boseman & Lockhart.

The show initially deals primarily with the storylines of its three female leads – Diane, Lucca, and Maia – and contains considerable political and social commentary, exploring topical issues such as the alt-right, the MeToo movement, online harassment, and fake news. As well as starting again in a new firm with its own office politics to deal with, longtime Democrat Diane must navigate a world she hardly recognizes, becoming increasingly troubled by Trump-era politics and the actions of his administration.

Lucca Quinn, a former employee of Diane's, has found firm footing at Reddick, Boseman & Lockhart and is a rising star on the partner track, balancing her dedication to her work and a romantic entanglement with US Attorney Colin Morello, a frequent opposing counsel. Meanwhile, Maia, Diane's goddaughter, is trying to get her legal career off to a good start, while coming under pressure from the FBI over alleged involvement with her father's Ponzi scheme. The firm is also joined by Marissa Gold, a recurring character on The Good Wife, an intelligent and self-assured young woman with Democratic Party connections who becomes their newest private investigator.

Like The Good Wife, the show makes use of an extensive cast of supporting characters, including a recurring stable of opposing counsel, clients, police officers, FBI agents, judges, and politicians. Many are played by well-known guest stars.

== Episodes ==
Season	Episodes	Originally released		
Season	Episodes	First released	Last released	Network
1	10	February 19, 2017	April 16, 2017	CBS All Access
2	13	March 4, 2018	May 27, 2018	CBS All Access
3	10	March 14, 2019	May 16, 2019	CBS All Access
4	7	April 9, 2020	May 28, 2020	CBS All Access
5	10	June 24, 2021	August 26, 2021	Paramount+
6	10	September 8, 2022	November 10, 2022	Paramount+

== Cast and characters ==
=== Main ===
- Christine Baranski as Diane Lockhart, (Note: Character originated on The Good Wife.) who loses her savings after an enormous financial scam and joins Reddick, Boseman & Kolstad, one of Chicago's pre-eminent law firms. In season two, Diane becomes a name partner in the renamed Reddick, Boseman & Lockhart. The firm later becomes Reddick Lockhart.
- Rose Leslie as Maia Rindell (seasons 1–3), Diane's goddaughter, who joins Reddick, Boseman & Lockhart as an associate just after passing the bar exam
- Erica Tazel as Barbara Kolstad (season 1; guest season 2), a name partner at Reddick, Boseman & Kolstad who leaves the firm at the beginning of the second season
- Cush Jumbo as Lucca Quinn (seasons 1–4; guest season 5), an associate who works with Diane and Maia at Reddick, Boseman & Lockhart. She was made the head of divorce law at RBL in season 3.
- Delroy Lindo as Adrian Boseman (seasons 1–4; guest season 5), an attorney who offers Diane a job at his law firm following her financial troubles, and a name partner at Reddick, Boseman & Lockhart
- Sarah Steele as Marissa Gold, Diane Lockhart's assistant and later an investigator at RBL
- Justin Bartha as Colin Morrello (seasons 1–2), a successful lawyer in the US Attorney's office who later becomes the father of Lucca's son and a United States congressman for Illinois' 1st district
- Nyambi Nyambi as Jay DiPersia (seasons 2–6; recurring season 1), the effective lead investigator for Reddick, Boseman & Lockhart. His storylines include his immigration status, and later suffering from long covid and hallucinations.
- Michael Boatman as Julius Cain (seasons 2–6; recurring season 1), a managing partner for Reddick, Boseman & Lockhart, and Diane's former partner at Lockhart/Gardner. He later becomes a federal judge. After being pardoned following a wrongful conviction for bribery, he returns to the firm as of counsel.
- Audra McDonald as Liz Reddick (seasons 2–6), a former United States Attorney and the ex-wife of name partner Adrian Boseman, who comes to the firm as name partner following her father's death
- Michael Sheen as Roland Blum (season 3), a new attorney working with Maia on a murder trial. The character purports to be a protégé of Roy Cohn and is inspired by Cohn and his acolyte, Roger Stone. Sheen describes him as "devilish," saying "he wants to eat and disrupt and fuck, and poke people."
- Zach Grenier as David Lee (seasons 4–5; guest seasons 1 & 6), the sardonic former head of family law at Diane's previous firm, Lockhart Gardner. He is now a partner at STR Laurie, an international firm that has bought Reddick, Boseman & Lockhart.
- John Larroquette as Gavin Firth (season 4), a top partner at STR Laurie (Note: Credited among main cast from season 4, episode 5 on.)
- Charmaine Bingwa as Carmen Moyo (seasons 5–6), a new associate at Reddick Lockhart
- Mandy Patinkin as Hal Wackner (season 5), a layman with no legal training who opens a court in the back of a copy shop
- John Slattery as Dr. Lyle Bettencourt (season 6), a physician who provides medical therapy to help Diane to relax
- Andre Braugher as Ri'Chard Lane (season 6), a new name partner installed at the firm by STR Laurie

=== Recurring ===
- Zachary Booth as Jerry Warshofsky (seasons 1–2), a funder, along with Tom Duncan, for Reddick, Boseman & Lockhart, who uses computer algorithms to determine which cases the firm should pursue
- Gary Cole as Kurt McVeigh, Diane Lockhart's husband
- Corey Cott as Tom C. Duncan (seasons 1–2), a funder, along with Jerry Warshofsky, for Reddick, Boseman & Lockhart, who uses computer algorithms to determine which cases the firm should pursue
- William M. Finkelstein as Simon Kassovitz (seasons 1–3), a conservative Jewish judge
- Paul Guilfoyle as Henry Rindell (seasons 1–2), Maia's father, who is a wildly successful financial advisor, phenomenally wealthy and universally loved. He, Lenore, and Maia are the unofficial First Family of Chicago. He is arrested for running a giant Ponzi scheme with Diane as one of his victims.
- Adam Heller as Wilbur Dincon (seasons 1–2 & 4), the United States Attorney for the Northern District of Illinois
- Chalia La Tour as Yesha Mancini (season 1), an attorney who represented Maia in her legal issues stemming from her father's arrest.
- Jane Lynch as Madeline Starkey (seasons 1–2 & 5), a relentless FBI agent with a quirky personal style who believes Maia to be complicit in her father's scheming
- Andrea Martin as Francesca Lovatelli (seasons 1–3), Colin Morello's mother and a controlling influence in his bid to join Congress
- Tom McGowan as Jax Rindell (season 1), Maia's uncle
- John Cameron Mitchell as Felix Staples (seasons 1, 3–4 & 6), an alt-right gadfly
- Matthew Perry as Mike Kresteva (season 1), a lawyer who, after losing the 2012 Illinois gubernatorial election to Peter Florrick, now works for the US Department of Justice, in charge of an investigation encompassing Diane Lockhart and senior staff at Reddick, Boseman & Lockhart
- Bernadette Peters as Lenore Rindell (seasons 1–2), Maia's mother who comes from a tough working-class background and is a natively brilliant financial whiz. She, Henry, and Maia are the unofficial First Family of Chicago.
- Carrie Preston as Elsbeth Tascioni (seasons 1–2 & 6), a quirky yet smart lawyer
- Fisher Stevens as Gabriel Kovac (seasons 1–2, 4), an incompetent small-time lawyer
- Tyrone Mitchell Henderson as Barry Poe (seasons 2–5), an equity partner of RB&L and Reddick Lockhart, who specializes in criminal law
- Heléne Yorke as Amy Breslin (seasons 1–2), an assistant state attorney and Maia's girlfriend
- Alan Alda as Solomon Waltzer (seasons 2–3), a renowned lawyer at a national firm who uses dishonest tactics to achieve his aims
- Wendell B. Franklin as Captain Ian Lawrence (seasons 2–3), Liz's husband, a CPD officer. They begin divorce proceedings in the third season.
- Taylor Louderman as Tara Strokes (seasons 2–3), a porn star who claims to have had a relationship with Donald Trump
- Margo Martindale as Ruth Eastman (seasons 2 & 5), consultant for the Democratic National Committee
- Tim Matheson as Tully (season 2), a left-wing protester who has a sexual relationship with Diane
- Rob McClure as Trig Mullaney (seasons 2 & 5), an unintelligent recently Trump-appointed judge with very little understanding of the law
- Mike Pniewski as Frank Landau (seasons 2–4 & 6), a Democratic boss in the Chicago area
- Keesha Sharp as Naomi Nivola (seasons 2–3), a news anchor investigating #MeToo allegations who has a history with Adrian. She dates Jay in the third season.
- Lauren Patten as Polly Dean (season 3), a member of Diane's anti-Trump resistance group
- Tamberla Perry as Charlotte Hazlewood (seasons 3–5), a judge who serves as adjudicator of the Lawrences' divorce trial and who enters into a relationship with Adrian
- Kate Shindle as Rachelle Max (season 3), a member of Diane's resistance group
- Hugh Dancy as Caleb Garlin (seasons 4–5), a junior lawyer at STR Laurie with a photographic memory, sent down to RB&L as the multinational firm's "eyes and ears"
- Chasten Harmon as Bianca Skye (seasons 4–5), a wealthy client of Reddick, Boseman & Lockhart who befriends Lucca
- Wayne Brady as Del Cooper (seasons 5–6), a television producer who runs Judge Wackner's show
- Wanda Sykes as Allegra Durado (season 5), a lawyer recruited to RB&L by Liz and Diane
- Tony Plana as Oscar Rivi (seasons 5–6), a drug lord and client of RB&L
- Alok Tewari and Anthony Cochrane (seasons 5–6), as Osman and Winston, two STR Laurie executives who handle the firm
- Ben Shenkman as Ben-Baruch (season 6), a criminal associated with Charles Lester whom Carmen Moyo represents.
- Phylicia Rashad as Renetta Clark (season 6), the leader of a covert organization
- Daniel Breaker as Randy Elkin (season 6), an associate of Renetta
- Shahar Isaac as Zev Beker (season 6), a Krav Maga instructor

=== Guests ===
==== Introduced in season 1 ====
- Jerry Adler as Howard Lyman (seasons 1–2), a geriatric partner at Diane Lockhart's former firm, and now judge, who shows chauvinistic and stereotyping tendencies
- Jane Alexander as Suzanne Morris (seasons 1–2), a judge
- Becky Ann Baker as Alma Hoff (seasons 1–2 & 6), a principled lawyer at a rival firm
- Dylan Baker as Colin Sweeney (seasons 1–2), a client of the firm and a likely serial killer who has gotten away with many of his crimes
- Mark Linn-Baker as Don Linden (season 1), a judge
- Jason Biggs as Dylan Stack (season 1), a wealthy tech entrepreneur involved in the creation of Bitcoin, wanted by US officials
- Louis Gossett Jr. as Carl Reddick (season 1), a name partner at Reddick, Boseman who has semi-retired. He dies before season two. In season three, it is revealed that he raped his secretary, the firm transcriptionist and many others.
- John Benjamin Hickey as Neil Gross (seasons 1 & 6), owner of Internet firm Chumhum
- Jayne Houdyshell as Renee Rampling (seasons 1–2), a friend of Diane's at a rival firm who cuts ties with Diane after the Rindell scandal
- Christine Lahti as Andrea Stevens (seasons 1–2), a high-powered lawyer from Los Angeles who often appears opposite Reddick, Boseman in cases involving film and television
- Greta Lee as Amber Wood-Lutz (seasons 1–2), a young lawyer at a rival firm whose beaming smile obscures her sneaky tactics in court
- Kelli O'Hara as Deirdre Kresteva (season 1), the wife of Mike Kresteva
- Denis O'Hare as Charles Abernathy (seasons 1–2 & 5), a judge whose strong liberal and socialist leanings lead him to overcompensate in favor of conservative litigants
- Kevin Pollak as Kyle Gallo (season 1), a judge
- Aaron Tveit as Spencer Zschau (seasons 1, 3 & 5), an assistant United States attorney

==== Introduced in season 2 ====
- F. Murray Abraham as Burl Preston (season 2), a condescending LA lawyer who mainly represents film studios and the rich and famous
- Obba Babatundé as Danny Quinn (season 2), Lucca's father
- Christian Borle as Carter Schmidt (season 2), a challenging rival attorney
- Mike Colter as Lemond Bishop (seasons 2–3), Chicago's top drug lord and a kingpin of crime, who retains Diane as his lawyer after he is released from prison
- Kurt Fuller as Peter Dunaway (seasons 2–3), a stern but fair judge who had little time for Diane's partners at her old firm
- Mamie Gummer as Nancy Crozier (seasons 2 & 5), a tough rival trial attorney who charms judges with her sweet-as-pie trial routine
- Megan Hilty as Holly Westfall (season 2), a ballistics expert and Kurt's former protégée with whom he had an affair while married to Diane
- Nikki M. James as Monica Timmons (seasons 2 & 4), a young African American lawyer who sued Diane's old firm for racial bias in hiring
- Judith Light as Deidre Quinn (season 2), Lucca's mother
- Richard Masur as Geoffrey Solomon (season 2), a relaxed arbiter
- Bebe Neuwirth as Claudia Friend (seasons 2 & 5), a no-nonsense judge with a pragmatic approach
- Rob Reiner as Josh Brickner (seasons 2 & 4), a judge
- Ashlei Sharpe Chestnut as Rachelle Dabrezil (season 2), former Miss Haiti and friend of Dominika Sokolov.
- Wallace Shawn as Charles Lester (seasons 2 & 5–6), initially Lemond Bishop's terrifying personal lawyer and fixer who is known for making witnesses disappear, later working for Oscar Rivi and Ben-Baruch
- Matt Walsh as Oliver Walenstadt (season 2), a judge

==== Introduced in season 3 ====
- Tituss Burgess as Wade V. (season 3), a stylist for the stars
- Chris Butler as Matan Brody (season 3), a Chicago ASA
- Gary Carr as himself (season 3), an actor who observes Lucca at work as research for a role
- Jane Curtin as Pamela Farley (season 3), a judge
- Katie Finneran as Valerie Peyser (season 3), the leader of a resistance group in Chicago
- Gina Gershon as "Melania Trump" (season 3)
- Cheryl Hines as Brenda DiCarlo (season 3), an investigator hired by ChumHum to investigate sexual misconduct at the firm
- Vernon Jordan as himself (season 3)
- Richard Kind as Alan Davies (seasons 3 & 6), a judge
- Kathy Najimy as Gayle Eno (season 3), a judge

==== Introduced in season 4 ====
- Linda Emond as Leora Kuhn (season 4), the rule-abiding judge of a military court
- Andrea Navedo as Marta Tecades (season 4), Diane's client for a case that is disrupted by Memo 618
- Raúl Esparza as Brian Kneef (season 4), the contemptuous head of litigation at STR Laurie
- Erik King as Jonah (season 4)
- Lorraine Toussaint as Nia Rogers (season 4), a lawyer representing the Olympic Committee
- Donna Lynne Champlin as Mrs. Feldman (season 4), a former cheerleader who had attended an event with Donald Trump and Jeffrey Epstein

==== Introduced in season 5 ====
- Stephen Lang as David Cord (season 5), a wealthy conservative who funds Judge Wackner's show
- Danny Pino as Ricardo Diaz (season 5), a lawyer

==== Introduced in season 6 ====
- Alan Cumming as Eli Gold, Marissa's father and a Democratic operative
- Erich Bergen as Steven Sheen, a prosecutor
- Paul Scheer as Matt Brittel, a lawyer
- Jennifer Ehle as Ashley Burnett, a pro-life judge
- Eric Stoltz as Judge Meachem
- Greg Germann as Edward Sandel, an attorney
- Thomas Middleditch as Kyle Vespertine-Kalepark, an investigator
- Joanna Gleason as Carmella Romano, a judge
- Steven Pasquale as Johnny Elfman, chair of the Democratic National Committee

== Production ==
=== Development ===
Promotional poster

In February 2016, Michelle and Robert King, when asked about a spin-off from The Good Wife, stated that there was a possibility for a spin-off series. In May 2016, CBS was in final negotiations to set up a spin-off featuring Christine Baranski reprising her role as Diane Lockhart, but which would air on CBS All Access instead of the network. The spin-off was officially ordered to series on May 18, with Cush Jumbo returning as well. In September 2016, it was confirmed that the 10 episode spin-off would premiere in February 2017, with the story picking up a year after the final episode of the original series and seeing Diane pushed out of her firm after a financial scam involving her protégé wipes out her savings, resulting in her move to Lucca Quinn's firm. The series was initially planned to air in May 2017 but was moved to February 2017 after production delays forced CBS to postpone the premiere of another new series, Star Trek: Discovery, that had been intended to launch the CBS All Access streaming service. After months of speculation, CBS revealed the title for the spin-off series, The Good Fight, on October 31, 2016. It was announced that the series would premiere on February 19, 2017. CBS released the first trailer for the spin-off on December 18, 2016, featuring footage from the premiere and later episodes.

On March 15, 2017, CBS All Access renewed the show for a second season with an increased episode count of 13, which premiered on March 4, 2018. On May 2, 2018, the series was renewed for a third season. In January 2019, it was announced that season 3 is set to premiere on the streaming platform on March 14, 2019.

On April 23, 2019, the series was renewed for a fourth season which premiered on April 9, 2020. Only 7 of the scheduled 10 episodes were fully completed before production came to a halt due to the COVID-19 pandemic. On May 14, 2020, CBS All Access renewed the series for a fifth season. In May 2021, it was announced that the fifth season was scheduled to premiere on June 24, 2021, on Paramount+. On July 20, 2021, Paramount+ renewed the series for a sixth and final season which premiered on September 8, 2022.

Beginning with the season 2 finale, and more prominently in season 3, episodes have increasingly featured animated music video segments written by Jonathan Coulton and produced by Head Gear Animation in Toronto, Canada, that discuss subjects relevant to an episode. Coulton had been involved in the Kings' previous series BrainDead, which featured musical recaps performed by the singer. The segments have drawn comparisons to the series Schoolhouse Rock!, albeit discussing topics such as the impeachment process, non-disclosure agreements, and Russian trolls. Coulton remarked he shared the Kings' "sensibility of really liking to mess with the form itself and poke through the fourth wall a little bit", and has received a relative amount of creative freedom in regards to the content of these interludes. However, CBS requested the removal of a segment from a season 3 episode that discussed censorship in China. The network agreed to allow the inclusion of a placard informing viewers of the removed content.

=== Casting ===
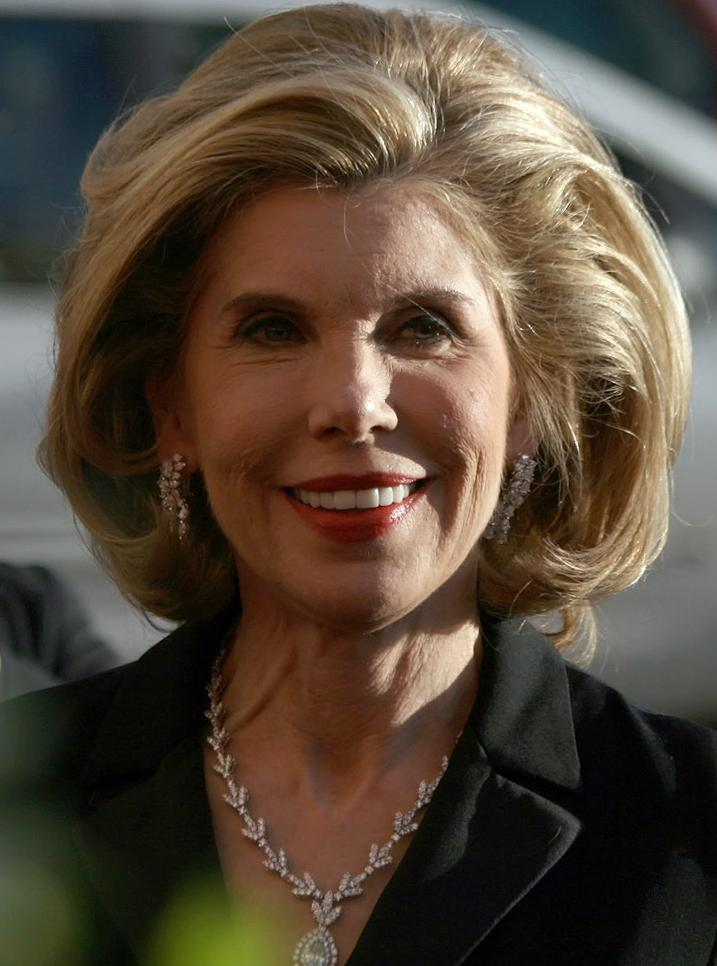
Christine Baranski plays the lead role of Diane Lockhart.

In May 2016, CBS was in final negotiations with Christine Baranski to reprise her role as Diane Lockhart and Cush Jumbo to reprise her role as well. After the series was picked up, it was announced that Jumbo would reprise her role as Lucca Quinn. Deadline announced on September 17, 2016, that Sarah Steele had been added to the cast, returning as Marissa Gold and appearing as Diane Lockhart's secretary-turned-investigator. On October 12, 2016, it was announced that former Game of Thrones star Rose Leslie had been cast to play a lead in the show, the role of Diane's goddaughter Maia who joins Diane's firm just after passing the bar.

The day after, The Hollywood Reporter announced that Delroy Lindo had been cast as "Robert" Boseman, an attorney who starts poaching Diane's associates and clients. The first name of Lindo's character was changed to "Adrian". Deadline reported on October 27, 2016, that the show had added Paul Guilfoyle and Bernadette Peters for recurring roles as Maia's parents. Guilfoyle would play Maia's father Henry, a wildly successful financial advisor who is phenomenally wealthy and universally loved. Peters' character Lenore was described as a woman who came from a tough working-class background and is a natively brilliant financial whiz. It was announced on October 31, 2016, that Justified alum Erica Tazel had joined the cast as a series regular.

On November 7, 2016, it was announced that Gary Cole would be reprising his role as Diane's husband Kurt McVeigh. It was confirmed on November 11, 2016, that Zach Grenier, Jerry Adler, and Carrie Preston would be returning as guest stars, reprising their roles of David Lee, Howard Lyman, and Elsbeth Tascioni respectively. On November 18, 2016, it was announced that Justin Bartha had been added as a series regular as Colin, a rising star in the US Attorney's office and love interest to Lucca. On August 1, 2017, it was announced that Audra McDonald had been added to the main cast for season 2 as Liz Reddick, reprising her role from The Good Wife season 4, and that Michael Boatman and Nyambi Nyambi had been promoted to main cast. On November 7, 2018, it was reported that Michael Sheen had joined the main cast for season 3. On February 20, 2020, Lindo announced he would be leaving the series as a regular following season 4. Jumbo was also due to depart at the end of season 4. However, due to the COVID-shortened season, the show was not able to develop the storyline that led to Lucca Quinn's or Adrian Boseman's departure. On January 27, 2021, Charmaine Bingwa was cast as a new series regular for the fifth season. On March 5, 2021, Mandy Patinkin joined the cast as new series regular for the fifth season. On April 5, 2021, it was reported that Jumbo and Lindo were set to return as guest stars to wrap up their storylines in the fifth season. In March 2022, it was announced that Andre Braugher had joined the cast as a new series regular while Alan Cumming would reprise his role as Eli Gold from The Good Wife as a guest star for the sixth season.

In 2019, Julianna Margulies said there had been a proposal for her to reprise her character Alicia Florrick in The Good Fight with a three-episode-arc, but that CBS had not been willing to pay her the salary she requested.

== International broadcast ==
On February 8, 2017, the series was picked up in Canada by Corus Entertainment to air on their cable channel, W Network; the American broadcast premiere of the series would be simulcast by Corus's broadcast system Global.

On March 2, 2017, Channel 4 confirmed it had acquired the UK broadcast rights for the series for its More4 channel following the success of progenitor series The Good Wife on that same channel. The series debuted on More4 on March 30, 2017.

HBO began airing all 10 episodes of the first season on June 1, 2017, in various European territories, while India's Zee Entertainment Enterprises obtained exclusive pay-TV rights to The Good Fight for its English-language general entertainment channel Zee Café, which also carried The Good Wife in India.

In Australia, the series's episodes were shown on free-to-air TV on SBS Viceland two days after their American broadcast.

In Southeast Asia, the series's episodes were shown on pay-TV on Fox Life two days after their American broadcast, then moved to ROCK Entertainment.

== Reception ==
=== Critical response ===
Critical response of The Good Fight
Season	Rotten Tomatoes	Metacritic
1	98% (57 reviews)	80 (45 reviews)
2	96% (28 reviews)	70 (5 reviews)
3	96% (23 reviews)	83 (8 reviews)
4	95% (20 reviews)	84 (7 reviews)
5	90% (10 reviews)	85 (4 reviews)
6	94% (16 reviews)	75 (6 reviews)

The Good Fight has been widely praised. Rotten Tomatoes reports that the first season has a rating of 98% based on reviews from 57 approved critics and an average rating of 8.18/10. The site's critical consensus reads: "An auspicious beginning for CBS All Access, The Good Fight solidly follows its predecessor while allowing for new storytelling styles, a wider narrative scope, and a chance for its lead to explore new territory with a relatable human struggle." On Metacritic, the first season received a score of 80 based on reviews from 45 critics.

The Los Angeles Times suggested that Good Fight creators Robert and Michelle King "still had the Good Wife magic" and though Good Wife "had already [run] its course" after seasons 6 and 7 had received mediocre reviews, "they just needed a clean slate" to allow them to continue to mine more stories from that fictional universe. In addition, unlike Good Wife which was centered around "romantic tension" and got bogged down in Alicia Florrick's (Julianna Margulies) love life, Good Fight was considered "refreshing for steering the story the other way" as relationships are "not the plot points that drive the story". Good Fight is regarded as a rare successful example of a TV series spin-off, as other contemporary TV series are either reboots or remakes.

Writing for Vox.com, Emily VanDerWerff praised the show's deft use of political themes, commenting that while The Good Wife was a commentary on "liberal hypocrisy" and the nature of moral compromise, The Good Fight stands out as a much more earnest "defense of liberal values", giving the show a compelling "reason to exist".

The second season has a 96% approval rating on Rotten Tomatoes, based on 28 reviews, with an average rating of 9.43/10. The site's critical consensus reads, "Angry but still fun, The Good Fight confidently elaborates on current political events with its deftly fictionalized plots." On Metacritic, the second season received a score of 70 based on reviews from five critics.

The third season has a 96% approval rating on Rotten Tomatoes, based on 23 reviews, with an average rating of 9/10. The site's critical consensus reads, "The Good Fight's third season pulls no punches, doubling down on the social commentary while maintaining the show's sensational delights to create one of the best dramas on TV." On Metacritic, the third season received a score of 83 based on reviews from eight critics.

The fourth season holds an approval rating of 95% on Rotten Tomatoes, based on 20 reviews, with an average rating of 9/10. The site's critical consensus states, "The Good Fight remains in top form with an over-the-top and completely captivating fourth season that plays to the show's strengths." On Metacritic, the fourth season received a score of 84 based on reviews from seven critics.

The fifth season has an approval rating of 90% on Rotten Tomatoes, based on 10 reviews, with an average rating of 7.05/10. The site's critical consensus states, "The Good Fight's fifth season continues to confront challenging current events with its singularly absurd style." On Metacritic, the fifth season received a score of 85 based on reviews from four critics.

The sixth season holds an approval rating of 94% on Rotten Tomatoes, based on 16 reviews, with an average rating of 7.4/10 The site's critical consensus reads, "Entering its final round having lost some key players but having gained the inestimable Andre Braugher, The Good Fight still carries plenty of satirical punch." On Metacritic, the sixth season received a score of 75 based on reviews from six critics.

In December 2023, Variety ranked The Good Fight #96 on its list of the 100 greatest TV shows of all time.

=== Accolades ===
Year	Award	Category	Nominee(s)	Result	Ref.
2017	Primetime Emmy Awards	Outstanding Original Main Title Theme Music	David Buckley	Nominated	
2018	Critics' Choice Television Awards	Best Actress in a Drama Series	Christine Baranski	Nominated	
2018	Critics' Choice Television Awards	Best Supporting Actor in a Drama Series	Delroy Lindo	Nominated	
2018	Critics' Choice Television Awards	Best Supporting Actress in a Drama Series	Cush Jumbo	Nominated	
2018	Primetime Emmy Awards	Outstanding Original Music and Lyrics	Jonathan Coulton (for the song "High Crimes and Misdemeanors")	Nominated	
2018	TCA Awards	Outstanding Achievement in Drama	The Good Fight	Nominated	
2019	Critics' Choice Television Awards	Best Drama Series	The Good Fight	Nominated	
2019	TCA Awards	Individual Achievement in Drama	Christine Baranski	Nominated	
2019	TCA Awards	Outstanding Achievement in Drama	The Good Fight	Nominated	
2020	Critics' Choice Television Awards	Best Actress in a Drama Series	Christine Baranski	Nominated	
2020	Critics' Choice Television Awards	Best Drama Series	The Good Fight	Nominated	
2020	Critics' Choice Television Awards	Best Supporting Actor in a Drama Series	Delroy Lindo	Nominated	
2020	Critics' Choice Television Awards	Best Supporting Actress in a Drama Series	Audra McDonald	Nominated	
2020	TCA Awards	Outstanding Achievement in Drama	The Good Fight	Nominated	
2021	Critics' Choice Television Awards	Best Actress in a Drama Series	Christine Baranski	Nominated	
2021	Critics' Choice Television Awards	Best Drama Series	The Good Fight	Nominated	
2022	Critics' Choice Television Awards	Best Actress in a Drama Series	Christine Baranski	Nominated	
2022	Critics' Choice Television Awards	Best Drama Series	The Good Fight	Nominated	
2022	Critics' Choice Television Awards	Best Supporting Actor in a Drama Series	Mandy Patinkin	Nominated	
2022	Critics' Choice Television Awards	Best Supporting Actress in a Drama Series	Audra McDonald	Nominated	
2022	Golden Globe Awards	Best Actress in a Drama Series	Christine Baranski	Nominated	
2022	TCA Awards	Outstanding Achievement in Drama	The Good Fight	Nominated	
2023	Critics' Choice Television Awards	Best Actress in a Drama Series	Christine Baranski	Nominated	
2023	Critics' Choice Television Awards	Best Drama Series	The Good Fight	Nominated	
2023	Critics' Choice Television Awards	Best Supporting Actor in a Drama Series	Andre Braugher	Nominated	
2023	Critics' Choice Television Awards	Best Supporting Actress in a Drama Series	Audra McDonald	Nominated	
2023	TCA Awards	Individual Achievement in Drama	Christine Baranski	Nominated	
2023	TCA Awards	Outstanding Achievement in Drama	The Good Fight	Nominated	
2023	Writers Guild of America Awards	Episodic Drama	Robert King and Michelle King (for "The End of Everything")	Nominated	
