= Jacquelyn Reingold =

American dramatist

- Education: MFA in playwriting from Ohio University
- Occupations: American playwright, screenwriter, and producer
- Writing career
- Notable awards: 1994 Kennedy Center Fund for New American Plays Roger Stevens Award

Jacquelyn Reingold is an American playwright, TV writer, and teacher. She has written multiple plays and worked for television. Her television career started with writing for HBO.

== Career ==
Reingold was a dramatic writing teacher at Ohio University, New York University, and Columbia University. She is a part of the Ensemble Studio Theatre, including its Playwrights Unit. She is an alumna of New Dramatists and co-founded the Honor Roll! group which in an action and advocacy group for women+ playwrights over 40, to increase their inclusion in theater.

She wrote the play String Fever, based around string theory, in 2003 for the Public Understanding of Science and Technology program from the Alfred P. Sloan Foundation. Reingold said that she knew nothing about string theory before writing the play. On March 31, 2004, her play 2B or Not 2B played as a public radio broadcast for Playing on Air. Three of her other plays have also been broadcast for the company. Her play They Float Up was performed in Dublin and off-Broadway in 2019.

Reingold began writing for television for In Treatment on HBO and Law & Order: Criminal Intent on NBC. She was an executive producer for The Good Fight. She was a co-producer for Grace and Frankie on Netflix and Smash on NBC.

== Personal life ==
Reingold earned an MFA in playwriting from Ohio University.

== Reception ==
Scott Collins of the Los Angeles Times wrote that the play Dear Kenneth Blake, about an immigrant from Cambodia, is a "touching production".

Her play Girl Gone won $15,000 from the Greenwall Foundation's Oscar M. Reubhausen Commission. Girl Gone also won the Kennedy Center Fund for New American Plays Award, became a finalist to for the Susan Smith Blackburn Prize, and was an honorable mention to receive the Jane Chambers Award. She also received a playwriting grant from New York Foundation for the Arts, two commissions from the Sloan Foundation, was a finalist for the Todd McNerney Prize, and received Fellowships from MacDowell, Hermitage, and Ucross.

Her plays have appeared in Women Playwrights: The Best Plays and several Best American Short Plays. A collection of her one-acts Things Between Us, is published by DPS. Other published plays include Freeze Tag, String Fever, Girl Gone.
