= Brooke Kennedy =

American television producer and director

- Occupations: Television producer and director
- Years active: 1979–present

Brooke Kennedy is an American television producer and director. Her credits include Crime Story, My So-Called Life, Numb3rs, Pushing Daisies, Fringe and Stumptown. She was also a producer and director on Third Watch and The Good Wife as well as on the spin-off, The Good Fight. In addition, she was also a writer on the series Prince Street and Third Watch. In 2010 and 2011, she was nominated for two Primetime Emmy Awards for The Good Wife as part of the producing team.
