= List of Defiance episodes =

Defiance is an American science fiction television series developed for television by Rockne S. O'Bannon, Kevin Murphy, and Michael Taylor. The series was produced by Universal Cable Productions, in transmedia collaboration with Trion Worlds, who produced an MMORPG video game of the same name that tied into the series.

Defiance was renewed for a 13-episode third season on September 25, 2014, which premiered on June 12, 2015. On October 16, 2015, the show was cancelled by Syfy after three seasons. During the course of the series, 39 episodes of Defiance aired over three seasons.

== Series overview ==
Season	Episodes	Originally released	
Season	Episodes	First released	Last released
1	13	April 15, 2013	July 8, 2013
2	13	June 19, 2014	August 28, 2014
3	13	June 12, 2015	August 28, 2015

== Episodes ==
=== Season 1 (2013) ===
No. overall	No. in season	Title	Directed by	Written by	Original release date	US viewers (millions)
1 2	1 2	"Pilot"	Scott Stewart	Rockne S. O'Bannon and Kevin Murphy & Michael Taylor	April 15, 2013	2.73
3	3	"Down In the Ground Where the Dead Men Go"	Michael Nankin	Kevin Murphy & Anupam Nigam	April 22, 2013	2.40
4	4	"The Devil in the Dark"	Omar Madha	Michael Taylor	April 29, 2013	2.29
5	5	"A Well Respected Man"	Michael Nankin	Craig Gore & Tim Walsh	May 6, 2013	2.15
6	6	"The Serpent's Egg"	Omar Madha	David Weddle & Bradley Thompson	May 13, 2013	1.98
7	7	"Brothers in Arms"	Andy Wolk	Todd Slavkin & Darren Swimmer	May 20, 2013	1.95
8	8	"Goodbye Blue Sky"	Andy Wolk	Anupam Nigam & Amanda Alpert Muscat	June 3, 2013	1.69
9	9	"I Just Wasn't Made for These Times"	Allan Kroeker	Clark Perry	June 10, 2013	1.91
10	10	"If I Ever Leave This World Alive"	Allan Kroeker	Bryan Gracia	June 17, 2013	1.60
11	11	"The Bride Wore Black"	Todd Slavkin	Todd Slavkin & Darren Swimmer	June 24, 2013	1.66
12	12	"Past Is Prologue"	Michael Nankin	Michael Taylor	July 1, 2013	1.94
13	13	"Everything is Broken"	Michael Nankin	Kevin Murphy	July 8, 2013	2.17

=== Season 2 (2014) ===
No. overall	No. in season	Title	Directed by	Written by	Original release date	US viewers (millions)
14	1	"The Opposite of Hallelujah"	Michael Nankin	Kevin Murphy	June 19, 2014	2.01
15	2	"In My Secret Life"	Michael Nankin	Michael Taylor	June 26, 2014	1.43
16	3	"The Cord and the Ax"	Michael Nankin	Allison Miller	July 3, 2014	1.49
17	4	"Beasts of Burden"	Allan Kroeker	Todd Slavkin & Darren Swimmer	July 10, 2014	1.65
18	5	"Put the Damage On"	Allan Kroeker	Nevin Densham	July 17, 2014	1.64
19	6	"This Woman's Work"	Allan Arkush	Brian Allen Alexander	July 24, 2014	1.61
20	7	"If You Could See Her Through My Eyes"	Allan Arkush	Brusta Brown & John Mitchell Todd	July 31, 2014	1.48
21	8	"Slouching Towards Bethlehem"	Larry Shaw	Bryan Q. Miller	August 7, 2014	1.62
22	9	"Painted from Memory"	Larry Shaw	Kevin Murphy	August 14, 2014	1.58
23	10	"Bottom of the World"	Andy Wolk	Anupam Nigam	August 21, 2014	1.42
24	11	"Doll Parts"	Andy Wolk	Phoef Sutton	August 21, 2014	1.50
25	12	"All Things Must Pass"	Michael Nankin	Todd Slavkin & Darren Swimmer	August 28, 2014	1.35
26	13	"I Almost Prayed"	Michael Nankin	Kevin Murphy	August 28, 2014	1.48

=== Season 3 (2015) ===
No. overall	No. in season	Title	Directed by	Written by	Original release date	US viewers (millions)
27	1	"The World We Seize"	Michael Nankin	Kevin Murphy	June 12, 2015	1.11
28	2	"The Last Unicorns"	Michael Nankin	Kari Drake	June 12, 2015	1.11
29	3	"Broken Bough"	Larry Shaw	Todd Slavkin & Darren Swimmer	June 19, 2015	0.88
30	4	"Dead Air"	Larry Shaw	Gregory Weidman & Geoff Tock	June 26, 2015	1.16
31	5	"History Rhymes"	Felix Alcala	Anupam Nigam	July 3, 2015	1.28
32	6	"Where the Apples Fell"	Felix Alcala	Paula Yoo	July 10, 2015	1.07
33	7	"The Beauty of Our Weapons"	Mairzee Almas	Manuel Figueroa & Jordan Heimer	July 17, 2015	1.11
34	8	"My Name Is Datak Tarr and I Have Come to Kill You"	Mairzee Almas	Kevin Murphy	July 24, 2015	1.24
35	9	"Ostinato in White"	Allan Arkush	Bryan Q. Miller	July 31, 2015	1.00
36	10	"When Twilight Dims the Sky Above"	Allan Arkush	Brian Allen Alexander	August 7, 2015	1.26
37	11	"Of a Demon in My View"	Thomas Burstyn	Nick Mueller	August 14, 2015	1.11
38	12	"The Awakening"	Michael Nankin	Todd Slavkin & Darren Swimmer	August 21, 2015	1.13
39	13	"Upon the March We Fittest Die"	Michael Nankin	Kevin Murphy	August 28, 2015	1.17

== Minisodes ==
=== Defiance: The Lost Ones ===
A five-part series of minisodes titled Defiance: The Lost Ones were released on March 28, 2014 on Syfy.com. The minisodes are each approximately 5 minutes long and they connect the first and second seasons while Nolan (Grant Bowler) searches for Irisa (Stephanie Leonidas).

No.	Title	Original release date
1	"No Man"	March 28, 2014
Nolan, searching for Irisa, asks a man in a bar if he has seen her. In a flashback we see Nolan's rescue of Irisa and their first moments together in a hospital. When the man insults Irisa, Nolan becomes violent but pauses when someone else points a gun at his head.
2	"Loose Ends Unravel"	March 28, 2014
The owner of the bar, Lenny, is an old friend of Nolan's, and stops his violent outburst. In a flashback, Nolan takes Irisa with him to keep her out of a refugee camp. Back in the bar, Nolan thinks that Lenny can help him find Irisa and he asks for his help; Lenny puts something in his drink and Nolan collapses.
3	"The Watchman"	March 28, 2014
Lenny was paid by a Castithan to drug Nolan; the Castithan questions Nolan regarding Irisa. When the Castithan prepares to kill Nolan, Lenny tries to stop him.
4	"Black Eyes"	March 28, 2014
Nolan wakes up and recognizes the Castithan as a member of the group from whom he had rescued Irisa. The Castithan asks where Irisa is; Nolan doesn't tell him and is tortured. In flashbacks, Irisa finds a knife and panics as it reminds her of the ritual to which she was subjected; Nolan calms her down and teaches her how to use it.
5	"The Searcher"	March 28, 2014
Nolan plays for time by talking to the Castithan. In flashbacks, a soldier discovers Nolan and Irisa in hiding; Irisa kills him to save Nolan. In the bar, Nolan manages to escape and finds a clue to Irisa's location. He knocks the Castithan unconscious and leaves for Chicago.
