= Defiance season 1 =

Defiance
- Season 1
- Season 1 DVD cover
- No. of episodes: 13

Release
- Original network: Syfy
- Original release: April 13 – July 8, 2013

Season chronology
- Next → Season 2

The first season of the American science fiction television series Defiance premiered on Syfy on Monday April 15, 2013 and ended on July 8, 2013 with a total of 13 episodes. The show stars Grant Bowler, Julie Benz, Stephanie Leonidas, Tony Curran, Jaime Murray, Graham Greene and Mia Kirshner.

The series is produced by Universal Cable Productions, in transmedia collaboration with Trion Worlds, who have released an MMORPG video game of the same name which is tied into the series.

== Cast ==
=== Main cast ===
- Grant Bowler as Joshua Nolan
- Julie Benz as Amanda Rosewater
- Stephanie Leonidas as Irisa Nyira
- Tony Curran as Datak Tarr
- Jaime Murray as Stahma Tarr
- Graham Greene as Rafe McCawley
- Mia Kirshner as Kenya Rosewater

=== Recurring cast ===
- Trenna Keating as Doc Yewll
- Dewshane Williams as Tommy LaSalle
- Jesse Rath as Alak Tarr
- Justin Rain as Quentin McCawley
- Nicole Muñoz as Christie McCawley
- Fionnula Flanagan as Nicolette "Nicky" Riordon
- Brittany Allen as Tirra
- Gale Harold as Connor Lang

=== Guest stars ===
- Robin Dunne as Miko
- Brian J. Smith as Gordon McClintock

== Episodes ==
No. overall	No. in season	Title	Directed by	Written by	Original release date	US viewers (millions)
1 2	1 2	"Pilot"	Scott Stewart	Rockne S. O'Bannon and Kevin Murphy & Michael Taylor	April 15, 2013	2.73
Nolan and Irisa scavenge an Arkfall impact site and recover a powerful energy source. They arrive in the town of Defiance – built on the ruins of St. Louis, Missouri, and populated by Human and Votan survivors of the wars. The town's lawkeeper is killed; Nolan is asked to track down the murderer. The killer is found, but not before the town's shield generator is destroyed, rendering it vulnerable to attack by the Volge. Nolan and Irisa use the power source they discovered to destroy the Volge attacking force; Nolan remains in Defiance as the new lawkeeper, with Irisa as a deputy.
3	3	"Down In the Ground Where the Dead Men Go"	Michael Nankin	Kevin Murphy & Anupam Nigam	April 22, 2013	2.40
A Castithan willingly undergoes torture to compensate for his cowardice in the defense of the town, but Irisa stops the ritual. The traitor who destroyed the town's field generator flees to a series of caverns in the ruins of Old St. Louis and attempts to overload a nuclear reactor and destroy Defiance.
4	4	"The Devil in the Dark"	Omar Madha	Michael Taylor	April 29, 2013	2.29
Two humans are attacked and killed by Hellbugs; Nolan, Irisa, and Yewll discover that they were actually murdered by an Irathient whose parents were murdered by the victims many years earlier in order to steal their land for the mineral rights. One of the Irathient Spirit Riders, Sukar, learns that Irisa has "The Sight" (an extrasensory ability to see the past, present and future without actually being present for the events seen) and helps her to tap into its potential to discover the murderer, another Spirit Rider named Rynn. Nolan, Irisa, Deputy LaSalle, and Sukar follow Rynn into the hellbug nest, capture her, and destroy the nest. McCawley deeds the stolen land back to the Irathient Spirit Riders.
5	5	"A Well Respected Man"	Michael Nankin	Craig Gore & Tim Walsh	May 6, 2013	2.15
Nolan rescues Kenya and one of her employees from having their adrenaline harvested for a drug. Meanwhile, Datak's wife Stahma maneuvers her husband into a seat on the town council. Rafe and Quentin discover a set of disturbing cave paintings featuring an object that Rafe's late son had in his possession.
6	6	"The Serpent's Egg"	Omar Madha	David Weddle & Bradley Thompson	May 13, 2013	1.98
Nolan escorts Rynn to prison via land coach; Amanda accompanies them, carrying investment money raised by the town to pay for a new rail spur to Defiance. Bandits attack the coach but Nolan, Amanda, and – to their surprise – Rynn foil the attempt. Meanwhile, back in Defiance, Irisa runs into the Castithan who ritualistically tortured her as a child and is intent on killing him before realizing that the man wants her to do so to fulfill a prophecy. She releases him and begins a relationship with Deputy LaSalle.
7	7	"Brothers in Arms"	Andy Wolk	Todd Slavkin & Darren Swimmer	May 20, 2013	1.95
A bounty hunter and old friend of Nolan arrives in Defiance to apprehend a Castithan fugitive and take him to the Earth Republic. Quentin is advised to destroy the book and artifact left behind by his brother.
8	8	"Goodbye Blue Sky"	Andy Wolk	Anupam Nigam & Amanda Alpert Muscat	June 3, 2013	1.69
During a Razor Rain storm, Irisa sets out to find Sukar after having a premonition of his death. Nicky searches for the artifact. Stahma attempts to hire Kenya to provide Alak with experience before his marriage but they finally become lovers. Alak and Christie argue over a proposed marriage ceremony.
9	9	"I Just Wasn't Made for These Times"	Allan Kroeker	Clark Perry	June 10, 2013	1.91
In the aftermath of the Razor Rain, an American astronaut, supposedly dead since 2013, is found in the wreckage of a recent Arkfall. Plague breaks out in Defiance, but affects only humans.
10	10	"If I Ever Leave This World Alive"	Allan Kroeker	Bryan Gracia	June 17, 2013	1.60
The disease infecting Defiance appears to be carried by the Irathients; all Votans appear to be immune. The Irathients are quarantined in a tunnel at McCawley Mines. A cure is sent from San Francisco, but lands beyond the quarantine zone imposed by the Earth Republic. Datak announces his intent to oppose Amanda for the position of mayor. Nicky reveals to Quentin that he has been lied to by his father.
11	11	"The Bride Wore Black"	Todd Slavkin	Todd Slavkin & Darren Swimmer	June 24, 2013	1.66
Things get heated as the discovery of the remains of a rich businessman leads Tommy to launch a murder investigation, with Datak as a potential suspect. The wedding between Alak and Christie is almost ruined when the future of the McCawley Mine is discussed.
12	12	"Past Is Prologue"	Michael Nankin	Michael Taylor	July 1, 2013	1.94
During a public debate between Datak and Amanda, Nolan kills a young Castithan aiming a gun at the stage. Datak asks for Earth Republic's support in exchange for the town's mines. Doc Yewll experiments on the gold artifact that seems to be linked to Irisa.
13	13	"Everything is Broken"	Michael Nankin	Kevin Murphy	July 8, 2013	2.17
Nolan searches for Irisa after she escapes from Yewll's office. Datak is named the new mayor of Defiance, and Earth Republic troops take control of the mines. The two artifacts are revealed to be keys to an ancient Votan ship and weapon system found in the mines. The Earth Republic captures Irisa; Nolan sets her free, but is shot in the process and dies. Irisa is able to bring him back to life after an agreement she makes with Irzu. The Earth Republic takes over Defiance.

== Home media ==
Title	Set details	Blu-ray and DVD release dates			Special features
Title	Set details	Region A / 1	Region B / 2	Region B / 4	Special features
Defiance — Season One	Discs: 3 (Note: Region B has 4 discs and region 2 and 4 have 5.); Episodes: 12	October 15, 2013	July 15, 2013	July 3, 2014	Deleted Scenes; Gag Reel; Region A / 1 only: Defiance: A Transmedia Revolution; Making Defiance; Behind the Scenes with Jesse Rath
