= Past Is Prologue (Defiance) =

- Defiance episode
- Amanda (Julie Benz) on Nicki's (Fionnula Flanagan) wake
- Episode no.: Season 1 Episode 11
- Directed by: Michael Nankin
- Written by: Michael Taylor
- Original air date: July 1, 2013

Guest appearances
- Brittany Allen (Tirra); Dewshane Williams (Tommy LaSalle); Trenna Keating (Doc Yewll); Jesse Rath (Alak Tarr); Nicole Muñoz (Christie Tarr)

Episode chronology
← Previous "The Bride Wore Black"	Next → "Everything is Broken"
- Defiance season 1

"Past Is Prologue" is the eleventh episode of the first season of the American science fiction series Defiance, and the series' eleventh episode overall. It was aired on July 1, 2013. The episode was written by Michael Taylor and it was directed by Michael Nankin

== Plot ==
During a debate between Datak (Tony Curran) and Amanda (Julie Benz) in the town square, Nolan (Grant Bowler) shoots a young Castithan aiming a rifle at the stage. The apparent assassination attempt is turns out to be a prank set up by Alak (Jesse Rath), and the dead 'shooter' one of his friends. The killing causes Nolan to lose the public's support, and Datak seizes the opportunity to oust him as Lawkeeper. Secretly contacting Earth Republic he digs up dirt on Nolan's past as a marine in the Pale Wars. Broadcasting his finding to the town as Nolan tries to make amends with the dead youth's family. Seeing that his past is coming to light, Nolan goes to Amanda's office and resigns. He confronts and beats Datak but is stopped from killing him by Irisa (Stephanie Leonidas), and the two decide to leave Defiance.

Alak ponders his role in his friend's death, asking his father why he suggested the prank knowing what might happen, but is stopped from asking further questions. Later Alak tries to give his respects to his friend's parents but is rejected. While out he is assaulted by men on Rafe's (Graham Greene) order. Rafe tells him that he is disappointed in him, and is beginning to question letting him marry Christie (Nicole Muñoz). Warning him that the time he disappoints him he will have him killed.

Meanwhile, Kenya (Mia Kirshner) goes to the Tarr residence to see Stahma (Jaime Murray). Accusing her of knowing that Datak set up Nolan, asking how she can love such a ruthless man. Stahma explains that she loves Datak because of how cold and ruthless he is and not for being kind. Kenya berates her and threatens to expose their relationship to the town, doing it to hurt Stahma rather than to affect their respective family's political standings. Stahma pretends to be unfazed to dissuade Kenya, knowing how damaging the truth would be, turning her back on her. Datak meets an Earth Republic official, planning to grant ER the town's mines once he becomes mayor in exchange for their support.

In her lab, Yewll (Trenna Keating) experiments on the gold artifact she took from Nicky. She discovers that it is connected to Irisa and is causing her great pain every time it is activated. As Nolan and Irisa prepare to leave, Yewll activates it, causing Irisa to collapse. Nolan brings her to Yewll's office, and after telling Nolan to stay outside, she operates on Irisa's back and finds strand like appendages coming out of her and connecting with ones coming from the gold artifact.

During the "operation", Irisa has a vision of her past, showing a silver object, identical to the gold one, melding with her body. Awaking she knocks out Yewll and escapes. Nolan enters the lab to find it ruined with Irisa gone. Irisa chases the girl she saw in her vision through the woods. Falling unconscious, she is found by Rynn (Tiio Horn) who debates whether to kill her or not after what Nolan did to Sukar. The girl from Irisa's vision watches in the distance.

== Feature music ==
In the "Past is Prologue" we can hear the songs:

- "Flirting With Disaster" by Young Beautiful In A Hurry
- "Time After Time" by Raya Yarbrough

== Reception ==
=== Ratings ===
In its original American broadcast, "Past is Prologue" was watched by 1.94 million; up 0.28 from the previous episode.

=== Reviews ===
"Past is Prologue" received positive reviews.

Rowan Kaiser from The A.V. Club gave an A− grade to the episode saying: "The most effective way to build a setting that will support good storytelling is to give the world a solid history. [...] Defiance has a solid history, which makes it a good example of why the historical approach to world-building works."

Jim Garner from TV Fanatic rated the episode with 4.3/5 saying that next week's finale episode had a lot to cover.

Lisa Macklem from Spoiler TV said that this week's episode had much intrigue. "Next week we have the election. Datak has clearly allied himself with the Earth-Republic, and Amanda may regret not doing so herself – though I think that is unlikely. I suspect that Datak will win the election and come to regret the alliance himself. In fact, it may be the thing that brings them all together next season – everyone of Defiance against the Earth Republic’s takeover."
