= Everything Is Broken (Defiance) =

- Defiance episode
- Amanda (Julie Benz) talking to Colonel Marsh (Barry Flatman) from Earth Republic
- Episode no.: Season 1 Episode 12
- Directed by: Michael Nankin
- Written by: Kevin Murphy
- Original air date: July 8, 2013

Guest appearances
- Dewshane Williams (Tommy LaSalle); Trenna Keating (Doc Yewll); Jesse Rath (Alak Tarr); Nicole Muñoz (Christie Tarr); Katie Douglas ("Young Irisa/Irzu")

Episode chronology
| ← Previous "Past Is Prologue" | Next → "The Opposite of Hallelujah" |
- Defiance season 1

"Everything Is Broken" is the twelfth episode of the first season of the American science fiction series Defiance, and the series' twelfth episode overall. It was aired on July 8, 2013. The episode was written by Kevin Murphy and directed by Michael Nankin.

== Plot ==
Nolan (Grant Bowler), with Tommy's (Dewshane Williams) help, searches for Irisa (Stephanie Leonidas) who has disappeared after escaping from Doctor Yewll's (Trenna Keating) office. Following her tracks, they find her with the Spirit Riders praying for Sukar's (Noah Danby) recovery and Rynn (Tiio Horn) having treated her injuries.

Back in Defiance, the polls open for the mayoral election. Datak (Tony Curran) and Stahma (Jamie Murray) go to cast their vote and they meet Amanda (Julie Benz) and Kenya (Mia Kirshner) there. Kenya reveals to Datak that Stahma was unfaithful to him and he threatens Stahma in the poll booth. Stahma goes to Kenya and asks her to leave Defiance with her, fearing that Datak will kill them both. Kenya however is suspicious of Stahma's intentions.

The two meet in the woods and Kenya pulls a gun on Stahma, knowing she is lying about them running away. She plans to hold Stahma hostage and make Datak leave town for good. However, Stahma poisons Kenya and she dies. Later it is shown that she killed her as a means of earning Datak's forgiveness.

Meanwhile, the Earth Republic storms into Doctor Yewll's office asking for Irisa. During the interrogation, it is revealed that the two gold and silver artifacts are the keys to a Votan ship buried in the mines. The ship carries a weapon capable of killing an entire species, and it is the real reason E-Rep is interested in Defiance. Yewll tells them that the keys are inside Irisa and they are already active.

Nolan and Irisa, now aware of the keys and their purpose, debate what to do. E-Rep comes looking for them and take the Spirit Riders hostage, threatening to kill them if Nolan and Irisa do not give themselves up. With no choice the two surrender. E-Rep takes Irisa with them and leave the rest to be killed. However Nolan disarms the executioner and follows them.

The election results are announced naming Datak as mayor, and E-Rep immediately moves in to the mines. Unaware of this, Datak looks like a fool when he finds out during his celebrations. At the mines E-Rep realizes that the keys have fused completely with Irisa's body, and they force Yewll to remove them.

Back in town, Datak confronts Colonel Marsh (Barry Flatman) in the mayor's office, furious with Marsh who made him look like a fool by moving his men into the mines without telling him. Datak realizes that there is another reason E-Rep wanted the mines, and Marsh reveals that they used Datak and will throw him aside when they are done. Stahma walks into the office soon after and only to find out that Datak has murdered Colonel Marsh. E-Rep soldiers come looking for Marsh and the two of them, realizing that they can not escape, they accept their fate as they are discovered.

As Yewll prepares to operate, Nolan, Tommy and a freed Rafe (Graham Greene) fight the E-Rep soldiers. Nolan frees Irisa, but as they fight to buy the others time to escape, Nolan is shot and killed. Heartbroken, Irisa has a vision of Sukar telling her that she has to fulfill her destiny. She descends into the mines where she sees a younger version of herself claiming to be Irzu. It is unclear if this is one of Irisa's visions, Irzu in disguise, or some other phenomenon. "Young Irisa/Irzu" (as she is identified in the credits) tells Irisa that she can bring Nolan back to life, but only if Irisa agrees to become Irzu's weapon. Irisa agrees and enters the ancient Votan ship, using its power to bring Nolan back to life while she disappears inside it. Nolan wakes up healed of his wounds, finding that Irisa is gone and he begins looking for her. His search is cut short as he discovers the E-Rep army moving into Defiance, announcing that they are now in control of the city.

== Feature music ==
- "Courage Under Fire" by Young Beautiful In a Hurry

== Reception ==
=== Ratings ===
In its original American broadcast, "Everything Is Broken" was watched by 2.17 million; up 0.23 from the previous episode.

=== Reviews ===
"Everything Is Broken" received positive reviews.

Rowan Kaiser from The A.V. Club gave a 'B' grade to the episode saying that he was looking forward for the next season. She also rated the whole season with a 'B+' grade. "But that's Defiance in a nutshell, isn't it? Some wonderful ideas, some well-developed structure, great character moments, and it's all put together a bit too messily. That's not a bad combination at all for the first season of a television show, mind you. It beats the hell out of properly-paced boring and inane. I am well and properly excited about having this kind of science fiction on television, and looking forward to the second season."

Jim Garner from TV Fanatic rated the episode with 4.3/5 saying that it was a good finale, giving answers to many questions that some were around since the "Pilot" but also leaving us with many ones to ponder. "When all was said and done, only the Irisa question really struck me as a cliffhanger. We've been dealing with that damn medallion and "what’s in the mine" for the entire season, so it would have been nice to have seen her in control of it or something at the end. But, that aside, it was a good finale. I’m happy with how the episode moved, and I adored Nolan for wanting to do the right thing by having Amanda fire him instead of trying to fight the propaganda fight Datak was staging."

Lisa Macklem from Spoiler TV stated that many questions had been answered, but many more were asked, leaving her wanting more much sooner than June 2014. "Generally, I very much enjoyed this first season of Defiance. The writing and directing were solid if not flawless, but the acting from the main cast was outstanding all season. [...] The dynamic in Defiance promises to be very different next season."
