= The Opposite of Hallelujah (Defiance) =

- Defiance episode
- Episode no.: Season 2 Episode 1
- Directed by: Michael Nankin
- Written by: Kevin Murphy
- Original air date: June 19, 2014

Guest appearances
- Dewshane Williams (Tommy LaSalle); Trenna Keating (Doc Yewll); Nicole Muñoz (Christie Tarr); Ben Cotton (Daigo); Anna Hopkins (Jessica "Berlin" Rainer); Ryan Kennedy (Josef); Kristina Pesic (Deirdre Lamb); William Atherton (Viceroy Mercado); Katie Douglas ("Young Irisa/Irzu")

Episode chronology
← Previous "Everything is Broken"	Next → "In My Secret Life"
- Defiance season 2

"The Opposite of Hallelujah" is the first episode of the second season of the American science fiction series Defiance, and the series' thirteenth episode overall. It was aired on June 19, 2014. The episode was written by Kevin Murphy and directed by Michael Nankin.

== Plot ==
Nine months later...

Datak (Tony Curran), who was elected as the new mayor of Defiance at the end of Season One, is now imprisoned in Earth Republic's Camp Reverie after murdering Colonel Marsh. He is replaced as "provisional" mayor by the E-Rep-appointed Niles Pottinger (James Murray).

Stahma (Jaime Murray) visits Datak in the prison camp, and he asks her to get him out sooner than the ten years to which he was sentenced, fearing that otherwise his business empire will collapse. Stahma tells him that their solicitor is working on it and reassures him that Alak (Jesse Rath) has taken over the business and he is doing really well. When Stahma leaves, Doc Yewll (Trenna Keating) who's also imprisoned, approaches Datak and asks for his help to a plan she has on how to escape. Datak takes her offer and agrees to help.

Back in Defiance, Amanda (Julie Benz) has taken over the Need/Want, her sister's business, after Kenya's (Mia Kirshner) disappearance. Stahma, who killed Kenya and knows she is not coming back, tries to convince Amanda to move on but Amanda is sure that Kenya will return.

Rafe (Graham Greene) works in the gulanite mines, now "nationalized" by E-Rep order. While working, an accident happens and Large (Roman LeBeau) dies. His distraught sons, Josef (Ryan Kennedy) and Hyatt (Sam Earle), are caught vandalizing an E-Rep poster and are arrested. Niles orders his bio-man assistant Churchill (Rob Archer) to "take care of them." Driving them to prison, Churchill lets the two boys escape, and they run into Hellbug territory where Hyatt is killed. Josef returns home and announces Hyatt's death. Amanda realizes their escape was arranged so as to make examples of the boys, and confronts Niles in his office demanding to know what happened. Niles shows her a video of the moment the boys escaped and says he didn't have anything to do with it, but Amanda doesn't believe him. She regrets having turned down Niles' offer to make her his chief of staff months earlier, speculating that if she hadn't, Hyatt might still be alive, and agrees to take the job "for now."

Alak deals with a supplier, Skevur (Michael Dyson), who delays the delivery of the drug called Blue Devil and convinces Alak to give him more time. Stahma warns Alak that he showed weakness and his father would never do that. She then takes action on her own, having Skevur beaten into returning Alak his payment. Alak realizes that his mother is responsible and confronts Stahma, who reveals that the family business really belongs to her and demands that Alak follow her orders from now on.

Meanwhile, in New Chicago, Nolan (Grant Bowler) continues his search for Irisa (Stephanie Leonidas). Nolan tracks down Daigo (Ben Cotton), the man who tortured Irisa when she was a little girl, interrogating and killing him. He heads to the Angel Arc to continue his search. Running into an old enemy who tries to kill him, he is reunited with Irisa, who appears and saves his life.

When Nolan asks what happened to her, Irisa lies to him, saying that E-Rep forces caught her. Nolan doesn't believe her, saying he saw her fall into the artifact in a vision, then woke up healed of his wounds. Irisa dismisses it as post-traumatic stress and says that she must return to Defiance after seeing "Young Irisa/Irzu" (Katie Douglas). While getting supplies, Irisa walks off and kills a woman for no reason. Irisa doesn't tell Nolan anything about her visions or her actions, and the two of them leave for Defiance.

At the end of the episode, Irisa has another vision of herself killing Nolan while Young Irisa/Irzu is there; Amanda uses Blue Devil; and it is revealed that Niles has a camera on Amanda's room and watches/spies on her.

== Feature music ==
The following songs are in "The Opposite of Hallelujah":

- "Across the Storm Divide" by Trace Adkins
- "VB" by VBM

== Reception ==
=== Ratings ===
In its original American broadcast, "The Opposite of Hallelujah" was watched by 2.01 million; down 0.16 from the previous episode.

=== Reviews ===
"The Opposite of Hallelujah" received mixed reviews.

Rowan Kaiser from The A.V. Club gave the episode a B rating saying that he was surprised that the show fast forwarded nine months instead continue from the cliffhangers of the previous season. "...To Defiance's credit, almost every single aspect of its new setup is more interesting than the first season's. Yet it does so without betraying or ignoring the events and characterizations of its early episodes. [...] I think the thing I admire most about "The Opposite Of Hallelujah" is that it's a commitment. Defiance could quite easily have reverted to the status quo, or it could have pressed ahead with some totally different mythological tone. Instead, it's respected its first season plot developments, while working to improve what it can and drive the story forward in the best possible fashion."

Michael Ahr from Den of Geek rated the episode with 4.5/5 saying: "...the pleasant surprise of the Defiance season 2 premiere is that it makes the entire first season read like exposition. Everything has been shaken up, mostly for the better."

Rutledge Daugette from Nerdy Raptor rated the episode with 4.6/5. "The Defiance season 2 premiere is one that shouldn’t be missed. Granted, it doesn’t have the same amount of action that we became accustomed to, but it does an excellent job of taking a series of events and somewhat foreshadowing the future of the show. With so many loose ends left in the premiere, the second season of Defiance is sure to be action packed."

Abbey White from Screen Spy gave a good review to the episode saying that it was a pretty sound one. "There was not a lot of action nor were there too many physical world changes. The character interactions, however, were some of the series best written. Perhaps this season will, despite the show’s heavy mythology and universe building, rely more on its characters to propel the narrative. If that’s the way they plan to go, things should definitely be interesting."

Kevin Yeoman from Screen Rant gave a good review to the episode. "'The Opposite of Hallelujah' benefits greatly from the additions to the cast, as Mayor Pottinger and Viceroy Mercado help break up the tenuous peace that defined the town of Defiance all last season, by drawing a clear line in the sand between the oppressors and the oppressed. That offers a different kind of dynamic than has been seen, and it opens the door for even more interesting and unlikely pairings"

Ricky Riley from The Celebrity Cafe also gave a good review to the episode, saying that the season started with a bang. "Over all, this was very good season opener. I will have to say that this show knows how to choreograph fight scenes like no one else can. Action movies should take note. Hell, all TV should take note. [...] This season is looking up. It has all the potential of being better than the first."

Jesse Schedeen from IGN rated the episode with 7.8/10 saying that the nine months time-jump might be "a comfortable way to ease back into the series, though it's not the most exciting way to kick off a new season." Schedeen closes the review saying: "Defiance's second season gets off to a good start, but not necessarily a great one. The new status quo allows for interesting changes in the lives of all the main characters, but the overall vibe and direction of the show hasn't changed as much as might have been expected given how Season 1 wrapped."

Andrew Clark from ThreeIfBySpace says that the season opener was weak. "I was disappointed with the content and was left still waiting for something to happen that never did. [...] The plot for this episode jumped around multiple times. In my opinion there are too many story arcs going on at the same time [...] With so many story arcs there is a lot of content, but not exclusive to one arc. This prevents me from finding a character I like and from being able to follow a clear story line."
