= The Devil in the Dark (Defiance) =

- Defiance episode
- Stephanie Leonidas as Irisa
- Episode no.: Season 1 Episode 3
- Directed by: Omar Madha
- Written by: Michael Taylor
- Original air date: April 29, 2013

Guest appearances
- Dewshane Williams (Tommy LaSalle); Trenna Keating (Doc Yewll); Jesse Rath (Alak Tarr); Nicole Muñoz (Christie McCawley)

Episode chronology
← Previous "Down In the Ground Where the Dead Men Go"	Next → "A Well Respected Man"
- Defiance season 1

"The Devil in the Dark" is the third episode of the first season of the American science fiction series Defiance, and the series' third episode overall. It was aired on April 29, 2013. The episode was written by Michael Taylor and it was directed by Omar Madha.

== Plot ==
Nolan (Grant Bowler), Irisa (Stephanie Leonidas) and Yewll (Trenna Keating) are trying to find the culprit behind the murders of two humans. They discover that the two men were targeted with Hellbug attack pheromones, attracting Hellbugs to kill them. In the room where the second man was killed, they find an empty Hellbug egg purse - something that one can't find outside the nest - leading them to believe that someone is behind the Hellbug attacks.

Meanwhile, Hellbugs attack the Tarr residence, where Christie (Nicole Muñoz) is having dinner with Alak (Jesse Rath) and his parents. Datak (Tony Curran) manages to kill the attacking bugs, and they all escort Christie back to her home. Nolan arrives after them, along with Irisa, Tommy (Dewshane Williams) and Yewll. Checking if any of them were targeted, they discover that Christie's clothes are sprayed with the pheromones.

Nolan discovers that the two dead men had sold land to Rafe McCawley (Graham Greene) in the past for his mines. Nolan, believing that the attacks are somehow connected with that fact, asks Rafe for details. Rafe tells him that there was nothing illegal when he bought the land, but he says that the two men had bought the land from an Irathient family. When Nolan sees the signatures on the papers, he realizes that something is not right.

In the meantime, Irisa starts to have "visions" again. When Nolan realizes that, he reminds her that those visions are post-traumatic stress and they are not real. When Nolan tells her he thought those visions had stopped, Irisa tells him that they never did, she just stopped talking about them. Her visions this time have to do with an Irathient family. In those visions she recognizes Rynn (Tiio Horn), one of the women of the Spirit Riders.

Later, while talking to Sukar (Noah Danby), the leader of the Spirit Riders, about Rynn and what she saw in her vision, Sukar informs Irisa that she has "The Sight", an ability where one can see the past, the present and the future without actually being present for the events. Sukar believes that this ability is given by the Irathient God Izru and the person who has it is blessed because they were touched by him.

Sukar helps Irisa to use her ability, so they can discover what happened in Rynn's past. Irisa sees that Rynn's parents were murdered because they didn't want to sell their land to the two men. Rynn managed to escape before the men could kill her. Rynn's father was an entomologist, a talent that Rynn inherited, helping her to use the Hellbugs to kill the men. Irisa's vision leads her, Nolan, Tommy and Sukar to the Hellbug nest that Rynn discovered, where they capture her. It is proved that she was behind the killings while she was trying to avenge her parents. Leaving the nest, they destroy it.

At the end of the episode, Rafe deeds the stolen land back to the Irathient Spirit Riders, since he didn't know that the two men had taken the land illegally before selling it to him.

== Feature music ==
The following songs are featured:

- "O-o-h Child" (Alternate version) by Beth Orton
- "O-o-h Child" (Remix) by Vink
- "O-o-h Child" (Cover) by Raya Yarbrough

== Reception ==
=== Ratings ===
In its original American broadcast, "The Devil In the Dark" was watched by 2.29million; down 0.11 from the previous episode.

=== Reviews ===
The reviews for "The Devil In the Dark" were generally positive.

Rowan Kaiser from The A.V. Club gave an A− grade to the episode saying that she wanted to focus on the potential of the show and even if the episode was a little sloppy with "typical early-series issues", there were a few things that it did extremely well. "Pacing issues, awkward dialogue, uneasiness about how to integrate the video game with the TV show: Those are all things that can and should be resolved in time. But intelligently dealing with the setting and how it affects its characters, just three episodes in? That's damn impressive, Defiance."

Lisa Macklem from Spoiler TV gave kudos to the cast for some wonderful performances and stated that the chemistry between Bowler and Leonidas is fantastic. "Overall, I really liked this episode, good writing and character development."

Jim Garner from TV Fanatic rated the episode with 4/5.
