= Pilot (Defiance) =

- Defiance episode
- Stephanie Leonidas as Irisa and Grant Bowler as Nolan on their first appearance on the series
- Episode no.: Season 1 Episode 1
- Directed by: Scott Stewart
- Written by: Rockne S. O'Bannon; Kevin Murphy; Michael Taylor
- Original air date: April 15, 2013

Guest appearances
- Peter MacNeill (Garret Clancy); Dewshane Williams (Tommy LaSalle); Trenna Keating (Doc Yewll); Justin Rain (Quentin McCawley); Jesse Rath (Alak Tarr); Nicole Muñoz (Christie McCawley); Fionnula Flanagan (Nicolette "Nicky" Riordon)

Episode chronology
← Previous —	Next → "Down In the Ground Where the Dead Men Go"
- Defiance season 1

"Pilot" is the two-part/two-hour first episode of the first season of the American science fiction series Defiance, and the series' first episode overall. It was aired on April 15, 2013. The episode was written by Rockne S. O'Bannon (part 1) and Kevin Murphy & Michael Taylor (part 2). Both parts were directed by Scott Stewart.

== Plot ==
Nolan (Grant Bowler) and Irisa (Stephanie Leonidas) drive through the terraformed landscape of Earth and observe an Arkfall event. They find the impact site and search the wreckage for salvageable technology, recovering a spherical power source. They are ambushed by Irathient marauders but escape with the sphere; Irisa is wounded and collapses. Nolan hides the sphere and then fights off an attack by spider-like creatures until he runs out of ammunition; he and Irisa are rescued by lawkeepers who escort them to the nearby settlement of Defiance, which is built on the ruins of St. Louis, Missouri.

The people of Defiance are celebrating the anniversary of the end of the Pale Wars and the founding of Defiance, which is home to a mixture of Human and Votan survivors of the wars. The mayor, Amanda (Julie Benz), seems to be losing faith in her ability to lead the people of the town. To make matters worse, tensions are rising between Datak Tarr (Tony Curran), a wealthy and influential Castithan, and Rafe McCawley (Graham Greene), owner of the mines that fuel much of the local economy. Irisa is taken to the Indogene Doctor Yewll's (Trenna Keating) office to be treated; she recovers from her injuries.

A budding romance between Tarr's son Alak (Jesse Rath) and McCawley's daughter Christie (Nicole Muñoz) is met with disapproval from her older brother Luke (Wesley French), and he and Alak have a minor but uneventful scuffle before Luke excuses himself from the festivities and disappears. Later that night Luke meets someone on the edge of Defiance and is killed. Meanwhile, with no money and no equipment, Nolan attempts to make a quick fortune prizefighting; he wins, but most of his winnings are confiscated by Datak Tarr, who runs the prizefighting ring and, it seems, just about everything else in Defiance. McCawley, notified of Luke's death, pursues Alak in a rage with the intent of lynching him. Nolan intervenes; in the ensuing fight, the town lawkeeper (Peter MacNeill) is accidentally shot and killed. Nolan persuades Amanda to let him track down Luke's killer; he investigates and discovers that Luke was killed by a Votan "coldfire" weapon.

Tracking the killer, Nolan and Amanda discover that it is her Indogene assistant, Ben (Douglas Nyback); Ben subsequently destroys the generator powering the shield which protects Defiance. They learn that a party of armed Volge are approaching Defiance with the intent of destroying the town. While Amanda attempts to rally the people of Defiance and construct a defense plan, Nolan and Irisa collect their reward and leave, retrieving the sphere. Nolan has second thoughts and returns to help defend Defiance and its people; Irisa, furious, leaves him behind.

The people of Defiance attack the Volge in a narrow canyon outside Defiance. During the battle, another Castithan, Elah Bandik (Robert Clarke), displays cowardice and flees, infuriating Datak. The battle is going badly for Defiance until Irisa returns, leading the Irathient Spirit Riders to attack the Volge on the ground; Yewll then uses the sphere to completely destroy the Volge. Nolan and Irisa reunite and decide to remain in Defiance; Amanda persuades Nolan to become the new lawkeeper and Irisa becomes one of his deputies.

At the end of the episode, it is revealed that former mayor Nicky Riordan (Fionnula Flanagan) and a man named Birch (Steven McCarthy) were behind Ben's treachery. They wanted the Volge to attack and destroy Defiance, for unknown reasons.

== Reception ==
=== Ratings ===
In its original American broadcast, "Pilot" was watched by 2.73 million.

=== Reviews ===
The critical reception of Defiance was "mixed or average" according to Metacritic, with a 57% rating according to 17 reviews.

Maureen Ryan of The Huffington Post said that it was a relief seeing that Defiance kept the label of the science fiction compared to other shows that have skirted that label but they didn't please the sci-fi fans. ""Defiance" is not just a smart, well-crafted TV show with a good cast and an adventurous flavor, it's also indisputably science fiction, which is a relief. [...] I am very intrigued to see where "Defiance" goes."

Ellen Gray of the Philadelphia Daily News said that Defiance stands alone. ""Defiance" the TV show may not break new ground in its two-hour premiere Monday, but it does stand on its own as a watchable sci-fi series, with a Wild West vibe mixed with a bit of "Farscape"-meets-"West Side Story."

Curt Wagner from Redeye said that the premiere of the show was a messy mash-up since there were too many stories on it and it looked overloaded, but it had potential. ""Defiance" grew on me the more I watched. I'm encouraged by some of the continuing story threads that have been introduced [...] If the writers continue to develop characters as they've started with Irisa, "Defiance" could reach its potential and become more than an pale imitation of better sci-fi."

Rowan Kaiser from The A.V. Club gave a B+ to the episode saying that it's not only a show with potential but it's good from the start. ""[...] and there are no major warning signs preventing it from maintaining or improving that quality. The future of the future on television may depend on it."

Lisa Macklem from Spoiler TV said she had been anticipating the show’s first episode and she will definitely be tuning in to see how these stories play out. "There has been a lot of hype and a flurry of press leading up to the premiere of Defiance. I’ve been anticipating the show’s first episode since I had the opportunity to tour the set in October. The extensive work that went into creating the world of the show paid off in big ratings for SYFY and a satisfying start to what promises to be a long running series."

Jim Garner from TV Fanatic rated the episode with 4.7/5 and said, "Overall, I’m very pleased with the pilot; the show has done a good job of telling an engaging story IN the future without it being entirely about the future. Can this continue through the rest of the season? I think so, unless the shtako hits the fan!"

Conversely, David Hinckley of the New York Daily News gave it one star out of five and found it to be "incomprehensible", but said "if you’re a sci-fi fan for whom this stuff can never be too complex, have at it."

== Feature music ==
In the "Pilot" of Defiance we can hear the following songs:

- "Outside Over There" written by Brendan McCreary and performed by his band Young Beautiful In A Hurry
- "Oh, Future" performed by Young Beautiful in a Hurry
- "Besash" written by Bear McCreary & David J. Peterson
- “The Ritual of Perpetual Motion" written by Bear McCreary
- "Terraform My Heart" written by Bear McCreary
- "Battle of the Volge" written by Bear McCreary
- "Votan Romance" written by Bear McCreary
- "Jackson" by Johnny Cash & June Carter Cash
- "Radioactive" by Imagine Dragons
- "If I Didn't Care" by The Ink Spots
- "The Preacher" by Jamie N Commons
- "Beautiful Day" by U2
