= The Bride Wore Black (Defiance) =

- Defiance episode
- Rafe (Graham Greene walking Kristie (Nicole Muñoz) down the aisle
- Episode no.: Season 1 Episode 10
- Directed by: Todd Slavkin
- Written by: Todd Slavkin; Darren Swimmer
- Original air date: June 24, 2013

Guest appearances
- Peter MacNeill (Garret Clancy); Brittany Allen (Tirra); Brendan McCarthy (Hunter Bell); Dewshane Williams (Tommy LaSalle); Trenna Keating (Doc Yewll); Jesse Rath (Alak Tarr); Nicole Muñoz (Christie McCawley); Fionnula Flanagan (Nicolette "Nicky" Riordon)

Episode chronology
← Previous "If I Ever Leave This World Alive"	Next → "Past Is Prologue"
- Defiance season 1

"The Bride Wore Black" is the tenth episode of the first season of the American science fiction series Defiance, and the series' tenth episode overall. It was aired on June 24, 2013. The episode was written by Todd Slavkin and Darren Swimmer and it was directed by Slavkin.

The names of the first season episodes have all been names of songs, albums or films. This title is also the name of a novel and movie, The Bride Wore Black.

== Plot ==
The episode starts with the bachelor party of Alak (Jesse Rath), where a dead body (skeleton) is discovered by accident but no one knows who it is. Tommy (Dewshane Williams) recognizes the body by the ring the dead man was wearing and identifies him as Hunter Bell (Brendan McCarthy), the previous owner of the Need/Want bar and abusive husband of Kenya (Mia Kirshner), who went missing seven years ago.

Nolan's (Grant Bowler) first suspicions go to Amanda (Julie Benz) and Kenya and for that reason he wants to let the case go but Tommy, who was helped in the past by Hunter Bell, does not want that. He goes back to the place where the skeleton was found to search for any missing clues and Irisa (Stephanie Leonidas) joins him in his research. The two of them discover hair of Liberata in the scene and they immediately suspect the barman of Need/Want, Jered (Jessica Nichols), who was working in the bar back then when Hunter Bell disappeared.

Tommy and Irisa go to Jered's home to question him but they find him dead. From the way he was killed, they suspect that Datak (Tony Curran) is behind the murder who probably killed Jered because he knew something and did not want him to talk. Nolan arrests Datak but soon lets him free. Knowing Datak and how he acts, Nolan never believed he was the murderer and he only arrested him so he can lead them to the real killer.

In the meantime, via flashbacks, we find out that Nicky (Fionnula Flanagan) is not a human but an Indogene disguised as a human. Hunter Bell had witnessed one of her meetings with Doc Yewll (Trenna Keating) and Nicky, not wanting him to expose her, she killed him. Jered witnessed the murder and now that the dead body was found, Nicky killed him too so he will not talk.

When Yewll finds out about Jered's murder, she realizes that Nicky is out of control and that she is not acting “for the greater good” anymore, as she was always saying. Yewll kills Nicky (by lethal injection) because it is the only way to stop her. Later, Nolan and Tommy find her body in her car—Yewll made it look like a suicide—with a note that Nicky supposedly wrote, confessing to both murders.

Meanwhile, Rafe (Graham Greene) realizes why Datak gave his permission to Alak to marry Christie (Nicole Muñoz) and he lets him know that after his death the mines are not going to Christie but to the Iraths. Datak, after hearing that, wants to cut off the wedding. When he tells Alak, Alak goes to Christie's house to let her know about his dad changing his mind. After having a talk with Rafe, Alak decides not to cut off the wedding.

The episode ends with the wedding and Nolan and Tommy solving the murder case by finding Nicky's body. Now that Nicky is dead, Yewll is the one who has the artifact and she hides it so no one can find it.

== Feature music ==
In "The Bride Wore Black" the following songs can be heard:

- "Castithan Wedding Song" by Raya Yarbrough
- "Wedding" by Shugo Tokumaru
- "Pachelbel's Canon in D Minor (cover)" by J. Pachelbel
- "Castithan Wedding Song" by Bear McCreary

== Reception ==
=== Ratings ===
In its original American broadcast, "The Bride Wore Black" was watched by 1.66 million; up 0.06 from the previous episode.

=== Reviews ===
The reviews for "The Bride Wore Black" were generally positive.

Lisa Macklem from Spoiler TV said that she enjoyed the flashbacks and that they episode had some really great plot twists and turns."Once again, most of the character revelations felt natural, and I think this speaks once again to the extensive preparation that went into crafting this world. The stories may not always unfold with no plot holes, but I still feel like patience with the unfolding of the characters’ stories has been rewarded."

Rowan Kaiser from The A.V. Club gave an A− grade to the episode saying that the episode was well-constructed and it effectively removed many of his original complaints about the show. "Heading into the last few episodes of the season, I thought I knew what was going to happen, and now I don’t. That’s another indicator of the impressive confidence Defiance has had in its first season. [...] I’m getting quite excited for the final two episodes."

Jim Garner from TV Fanatic rated the episode with 4.8/5. stating that the show had fully recovered from its recent plague and it was one of the best of the season.
