= If I Ever Leave This World Alive =

- Defiance episode
- Fionnula Flanagan as former Mayor Nicki
- Episode no.: Season 1 Episode 9
- Directed by: Allan Kroeker
- Written by: Bryan Gracia
- Original air date: June 17, 2013

Guest appearances
- Gale Harold (Connor Lang); Jane McLean (Olfin Tennety); Dewshane Williams (Tommy LaSalle); Trenna Keating (Doc Yewll); Justin Rain (Quentin McCawley); Jesse Rath (Alak Tarr); Nicole Muñoz (Christie McCawley); Fionnula Flanagan (Nicolette "Nicky" Riordon)

Episode chronology
← Previous "I Just Wasn't Made for These Times"	Next → "The Bride Wore Black"
- Defiance season 1

"If I Ever Leave This World Alive" is the ninth episode of the first season of the American science fiction series Defiance, and the series' ninth episode overall. It was aired on June 17, 2013. The episode was written by Bryan Gracia and directed by Allan Kroeker.

== Plot ==
A plague is spreading in Defiance, infecting and killing Humans. The plague is identified as a Votan sickness, to which all Votans appear to be immune. The Irathians are pegged as the cause, being carriers while at the same time immune. Amanda (Julie Benz), Nolan (Grant Bowler) and Christie (Nicole Muñoz) are infected during the episode.

Datak (Tony Curran) suggests to the town council that until they find a solution, they should lock up all the Irathients so no more people get sick. The rest of the members seem to agree with him, except Amanda (Julie Benz). After voting, Rafe (Graham Greene), along with others, starts gathering the Irathients to take them in a tunnel at the McCawley mines. Most of the Irathients are kept there when some others managed to avoid the quarantine. Irisa (Stephanie Leonidas) is one of those who are kept in the mines. After a scuffle with the miners, one of the Irathients gets shot and killed.

Yewll (Trenna Keating) contacts San Francisco where they have a vaccine for the infection and arranges for it to be sent. However the town has been surrounded by Earth Republic forces preventing entrance or exit to keep the infection from spreading. The vaccines are dropped outside Defiance and Nolan goes to get them along with Connor Lang (Gale Harold). Connor is able to talk Earth Republic into letting Nolan and him retrieve the cure.

They manage to get the vaccines but on their return, they are intercepted and captured by the Irathients who avoided the quarantine. They take over the Lawkeeper's office and threaten to destroy the cure if the rest of the Irathients are not released.

With Amanda sick, Datak has temporarily taken her place as Mayor and he meets the Irathient hijackers. He pretends to be in their side by saying that he will destroy the cure but he kills them all instead and takes the cure to bring it to Defiance. He then kills Connor who witnessed the whole scene, framing his death to the Irathients. Datak prepares to kill Nolan too but finds that he was unconscious the whole time due to the infection, and does not kill.

As the city recovers from the infection, Amanda and Datak address the town via the radio station. Amanda thanks Datak for taking over while she was ill only for Datak to announce his intent to run against her for the position of mayor.

In the meantime, Quentin (Justin Rain), after hearing what Nicky (Fionnula Flanagan) said about his mother, he meets her to ask some questions about it. Quentin gives Nicky the artifact and she tells him that his mother, Pilar, is alive and in Mendecino, but suffering from a bipolar disorder. After finding out that his mother is alive and his father lied to him, Quentin leaves his father and Defiance to find his mother.

The episode ends with a meeting between Yewll and Nicky where it is revealed that Yewll worked with Nicky and Birch in the past. Now that Birch is dead, Nicky asks Yewll to come back and work with her again.

== Feature music ==
In the "If I Ever Leave This World Alive" we can hear the songs:

- "Gone Again" by Patti Smith
- "Gone Again" by Brendan McCreary & Bear McCreary
- "Gone Again" by Chad Farran
- "We Were Sick" by The Thermals

== Reception ==
=== Ratings ===
In its original American broadcast, "If I Ever Leave This World Alive" was watched by 1.60 million; up 0.31 from the previous episode.

=== Reviews ===
"If I Ever Leave This World Alive" received positive reviews.

Rowan Kaiser from The A.V. Club gave a B grade to the episode saying that he felt slightly disappointed at how overstuffed the episode felt but interested in how it was going to get to an ending that managed to deal with the difficult premise.

Lisa Macklem from Spoiler TV stated that this wasn’t her favorite episode so far but it did raise a number of interesting issues.

Jim Garner from TV Fanatic rated the episode with 4.6/5 saying that we had explored few dark paths on the show so far, but they were nothing compared to the one this episode had taken us. "The irony of the story heading so far down the dark path that we will need a lantern, a rope and a map to find out way back was that it was also one of the best offerings of the season."
