= Goodbye Blue Sky (Defiance) =

- Defiance episode
- Stahma (Jaime Murray) is asking for Kenya's (Mia Kirshner) help concerning Alak
- Episode no.: Season 1 Episode 7
- Directed by: Andy Wolk
- Written by: Anupam Nigam; Amanda Alpert Muscat
- Original air date: June 3, 2013

Guest appearances
- Dewshane Williams (Tommy LaSalle); Trenna Keating (Doc Yewll); Justin Rain (Quentin McCawley); Jesse Rath (Alak Tarr); Nicole Muñoz (Christie McCawley); Fionnula Flanagan (Nicolette "Nicky" Riordon)

Episode chronology
← Previous "Brothers in Arms"	Next → "I Just Wasn't Made for These Times"
- Defiance season 1

"Goodbye Blue Sky" is the seventh episode of the first season of the American science fiction series Defiance, and the series' seventh episode overall. It was aired on June 3, 2013. The episode was written by Anupam Nigam & Amanda Alpert Muscat and it was directed by Andy Wolk.

== Plot ==
Irisa (Stephanie Leonidas) has another vision in which Sukar (Noah Danby) dies. After the vision she and Nolan (Grant Bowler) go to find Sukar and Irisa's vision is confirmed since Sukar was killed by a falling object from the sky. Irisa and Nolan, seeing the object, realize that it was part of an approaching razor rain storm, a storm that endangers Defiance. They have to inform everyone in town that the storm is not a simple one. Nolan returns to Defiance but Irisa stays back for Sukar's sinking ritual (his body will be consumed in an acid bath).

Sukar, right after they sink his body in the acid, rises fully healed and the Spirit Riders are confused because they do not know what happened. Sukar says that he is driven by God Irzu and he is on a mission but the other Irathients have doubts about it. He and Irisa return to Defiance, where Sukar starts collecting different objects for unknown reason. Irisa does not know what and why he is doing this, but she tries to help him.

Alak (Jesse Rath) and Cristie (Nicole Muñoz) discuss a bathing ceremony that Stahma (Jaime Murray) asked Christie to do with the family. Christie does not feel comfortable doing it and she argues about it with Alak. At the end, Alak agrees to talk to his parents and tell them that Christie will not join the ceremony.

Stahma goes to "Need/Want" bar to ask Kenya (Mia Kirshner) about her services for her son Alak before the wedding, so he will be prepared. She is concerned about it since humans and Castithans are very different. Kenya refuses politely and explains to Stahma that a human girl would not like her husband to be with a prostitute. While having a conversation over drinks, Stahma opens up to Kenya and the two of them end up in an intimate encounter.

In the meantime, Nicky (Fionnula Flanagan), not having any news from Birch, arrives at the McCawley home to find out what happened. Quentin (Justin Rain) reluctantly admits to his father Rafe (Graham Greene) that he killed Birch when Birch broke into their home and attacked him. He does not tell him though that he kept the artifact.

Nicky, suspecting that Birch is dead, tricks Rafe into revealing that Birch was killed when he broke into their home, but Rafe takes the blame to protect his son. In the meantime, Quentin has another "vision" of his brother Luke (Wesley French), who tells him that he should kill Nicky too because she knows everything, but Quentin refuses.

Meanwhile, Sukar finds all the items he needs and he and Irisa take over the radio station. Nolan gets there right after them thinking that Sukar wants to direct a falling Ark to Defiance. The falling Ark, if it impacts on Defiance, will destroy the city completely and everyone will die. He attempts to stop him by shooting him and throwing him from the Gateway Arch.

Irisa however, who does not believe that Sukar wanted to destroy Defiance, completes his task and activates the transmission. It is discovered that Sukar only wanted to change the direction of the falling Ark to save Defiance.

Doctor Yewll (Trenna Keating), while examining Sukar, finds out why Sukar "rose" and why he was healing so fast. It was not because of the God Irzu but because of little robots called nanites that were injected into his body by the razor rain object. Now that Defiance is safe, the nanites have gone dormant, and will no longer heal Sukar's injuries. Sukar survived the fall from the Arch, but he is paralyzed and in coma.

== Feature music ==
In the "Goodbye Blue Sky" we can hear the songs:

- "Into the Mystic" by Michael McDonald
- "Into the Mystic" by Jen Chapin
- "Eclipse/Blue" by Nosaj Thing
- "Happy" by Field Mouse

== Reception ==
=== Ratings ===
In its original American broadcast, "Goodbye Blue Sky" was watched by 1.69 million; down 0.26 from the previous episode.

=== Reviews ===
"Goodbye Blue Sky" received mediocre/positive reviews.

Rowan Kaiser from The A.V. Club gave a C grade to the episode saying that despite there were some cool moments and interesting ideas on it, it was not serving a larger purpose. "“Good Bye Blue Sky” isn't notably worse than several previous episodes of Defiance, but it frustrated me much more than those did. There are some cool moments, some disjointed ones, a lot of interesting ideas, and a famous song covered at the end. I normally enjoy that. But my problem with this episode is that it doesn't serve a larger purpose."

Lisa Macklem from Spoiler TV stated that the episode is particularly well-written. "I really enjoyed the peeling away of more layers on the show this week. The episode did a good job in illustrating that the tensions don’t just occur between human and Votans – though it’s understandable that those relationships pose the most opportunity for misunderstanding."

Jim Garner from TV Fanatic rated the episode with 3/5. "Defiance this week didn't so much feature a single main story, but instead focused on three arcs. Sadly, this left it feeling like "Good Bye Blue Sky" was doing far too much in a short amount of time."
