= A Well Respected Man (Defiance) =

- Defiance episode
- Kenya (Mia Kirshner) and Tirra (Brittany Allen) before they get kidnapped
- Episode no.: Season 1 Episode 4
- Directed by: Michael Nankin
- Written by: Craig Gore; Tim Walsh
- Original air date: May 6, 2013

Guest appearances
- Brittany Allen (Tirra); Dewshane Williams (Tommy LaSalle); Justin Rain (Quentin McCawley); Jesse Rath (Alak Tarr); Robin Dunne (Miko)

Episode chronology
← Previous "The Devil in the Dark"	Next → "The Serpent's Egg"
- Defiance season 1

"A Well Respected Man" is the fourth episode of the first season of the American science fiction series Defiance, and the series' fourth episode overall. It was aired on May 6, 2013. The episode was written by Craig Gore & Tim Walsh and it was directed by Michael Nankin.

== Plot ==
Nolan (Grant Bowler) intercepts a shipment of weapons being transferred by two men working for Datak (Tony Curran). Nolan is unaware that after the town lost its shield generator, the town council - without Amanda's (Julie Benz) knowledge - made an agreement between Datak to provide weapons for the town as a means of self defence.

Meanwhile, the relationship between Nolan and Kenya (Mia Kirshner) continues. Kenya wants their relationship to move from customer/prostitute to friends with benefits. Amanda is displeased with Kenya's relationship with Nolan, which leads Kenya to accuse Amanda of trying to replace their mother.

Kenya and Tirra (Brittany Allen), one of the girls who work at the Need/Want bar, are kidnapped by Ulysses (Rob Archer), a bioman working for Datak as a prizefighter. Ulysses is kidnapping people who are living in the street and taking them to Miko (Robin Dunne), a human lab technician who is harvesting their adrenochrome to use as an illegal drug.

Nolan and Amanda confront Datak, who refuses to help because they never show him any respect. Stahma (Jaime Murray) suggests to Amanda that the best way to show Datak respect is by making him member of the town council, which Amanda accepts in order to find her sister. With Datak's help, Nolan and Amanda locate the lab where Kenya is being held. Kenya escapes and kills Miko, and Nolan and Amanda arrive in time to save her from Ulysses.

Meanwhile, Rafe (Graham Greene) argues with his son Quentin (Justin Rain) following Rafe's decision to seal the shaft in the mines where Luke was working. Quentin believes Rafe sealed the shaft because he doesn't trust Quentin; however, the real reason is the strange object Rafe found in Luke's room. Rafe believes Luke found it in the sealed shaft and that it is the reason for Luke's death. Rafe and Quentin descend into the sealed shaft and discover a set of cave paintings featuring the object.

Flashbacks in the episode tell the story of Amanda, Kenya, and their mother (Severn Thompson) during the Pale War. Amanda and her mother were out scavenging away from town. When the area was attacked, their mother was prepared to abandon Kenya and flee with Amanda alone; Amanda refused to leave her sister, so their mother abandoned both. To spare her feeling, Amanda lied to Kenya, telling her that their mother died heroically. She gave Kenya a necklace they found while scavenging, saying their mother sent it as a gift for Kenya. As the young Amanda did not recognize the necklace as a St. Christopher's medal, she told Kenya it was "St. Finnegan, patron saint of lost children." Kenya attempts to give Tirra the "St. Finnegan" necklace as a gift after their rescue from Meeko and Ulysses, but Tirra correctly identifies the medal as St. Christopher. Kenya then confronts Amanda about the real meaning of her necklace and Amanda finally reveals the truth.

The episode ends with Datak taking his place on town's council, and Nolan realizing that Stahma is the more dangerous of the two. The last scene contains an allusion to the character of Madame Defarge in A Tale of Two Cities: as Stahma sits knitting outside the door to the council chamber, Nolan comments "I had my eye on the wrong snake. You are the dangerous one."

== Feature music ==
In the "A Well Respected Man" we can hear the songs:

- "Scarlet Town" by Bob Dylan
- "Rabba" by Falu
- "Royal Telephone" by Burl Ives
- "My Favorite Time of the Year" by Mike Goudreau & Friends
- "Ninety-Niners" by Bear McCreary

== Reception ==
=== Ratings ===
In its original American broadcast, "A Well Respected Man" was watched by 2.15 million; down 0.14 from the previous episode.

=== Reviews ===
"A Well Respected Man" received positive reviews.

Rowan Kaiser from The A.V. Club gave a B grade to the episode but he described it as unsatisfying as a whole, even as he respected and enjoyed most of its individual parts and scenes. "As much as I find myself fascinated by how Defiance is putting together its world and its narrative, I must say that I continue to be frustrated with its pacing. Every episode is filled with incident and has very little room to breathe, and yet it also feels like so much is missing. [...] I continue to hope that it’s just first-season jitters, but given the other things that Defiance does well, it’s easy to get impatient.."

Lisa Macklem from Spoiler TV stated that there were some excellent scenes but also a few instances of clunky dialogue. "The script for the most part was tightly written and well-paced. There were some excellent scenes with some powerful moments. There were also a few instances of clunky dialogue. However, there were a few potentially clichéd scenes that were turned on their head, and I’m enjoying getting deeper into the dynamics of the community."

Jim Garner from TV Fanatic rated the episode with 4.5/5 stating that the episode was the best one yet of the show. ""A Well Respected Man" was the best episode we've seen yet of Defiance. It featured just the right balance of heart, action, drama and intrigue to make for a very enjoyable hour."
