= The Serpent's Egg (Defiance) =

- Defiance episode
- Rynn (Tiio Horn) on her way to prison
- Episode no.: Season 1 Episode 5
- Directed by: Omar Madha
- Written by: David Weddle; Bradley Thompson
- Original air date: May 13, 2013

Guest appearances
- Ben Cotton (Daigo); Jane McClean (Olfin Tennety); Brittany Allen (Tirra); Dewshane Williams (Tommy LaSalle); Justin Rain (Quentin McCawley); Jesse Rath (Alak Tarr); Nicole Muñoz (Christie McCawley)

Episode chronology
← Previous "A Well Respected Man"	Next → "Brothers in Arms"
- Defiance season 1

"The Serpent's Egg" is the fifth episode of the first season of the American science fiction series Defiance, and the series' fifth episode overall. It was aired on May 13, 2013. The episode was written by David Weddle & Bradley Thompson and it was directed by Omar Madha.

== Plot ==
On a bus to New York, Nolan (Grant Bowler) escorts Rynn (Tiio Horn) to prison, while Amanda carries money raised by the town to pay for a mag-rail spur to Defiance. Also on the bus are an Earth Republic representative named Olfin (Jane McLean), her two husbands, Kasper (Milton Barnes) and Ziggy (Steve Lund), and a preacher named Preston (Andrew Musselman).

During the trip, the bus is ambushed and the driver is killed by a bomb planted by Preston. Preston, joined by two hijackers, demands the money Amanda is carrying. The ambush goes wrong; one of the hijackers and one of Olfin's husbands are killed. Preston is injured and takes Olfin as a hostage. During the ambush, Rynn escapes and disappears.

Nolan and Amanda concoct a plan to rescue Olfin; killing Preston and the remaining hijacker, they discover that Olfin was a secret partner in the hijacking scheme all along. Her plan was to steal the money Defiance had gathered to force the town to take Earth Republic's funding for the spur. As Olfin tries to get the money, Rynn returns and captures her. Nolan arrests Olfin and takes her back to Defiance; Rynn leaves with Olfin's second husband.

In Defiance, Olfin boards the next bus to New York in handcuffs; however, her supposed police escort immediately releases her as they depart. Olfin orders the police escort to find out everything they can about Amanda.

In the meantime, in Defiance, Irisa (Stephanie Leonidas) kidnaps a Castithan (Ben Cotton) because she believes he is the one who tortured her as a child. She tortures him in the same way, demanding he confess and explain his actions. Tommy (Dewshane Williams) sees Irisa's strange behavior, follows her and finds the captive Castithan. Tommy convinces Irisa to stop, which triggers the Castithan to confess and explain why he did what he did; he believed Irisa was a "destroyer/saver goddess", and to fulfill her purpose, she had to kill him after the tortures. Via flashbacks it is revealed that Nolan rescued Irisa as a child just before she was supposed to kill the Castithan. Irisa refuses to follow her supposed destiny, and releases him.

== Feature music ==
In "The Serpent's Egg" we can hear the songs:

- "Lovesong" by The Cure
- "Ride Captain Ride" by Blues Image
- "I'm in Control" by Jetsi Kain
- "Raiders" by Bear McCreary

== Reception ==
=== Ratings ===
In its original American broadcast, "The Serpent's Egg" was watched by 1.98 million; down 0.17 from the previous episode.

=== Reviews ===
"The Serpent's Egg" received positive reviews.

Rowan Kaiser from The A.V. Club gave a B+ grade to the episode saying that ii was the best-paced episode of Defiance yet but that doesn't mean it's perfect. "I feel like we're seeing Defiance shed its new-show issues every episode, and this one took one of the most major steps forward along those lines."

Lisa Macklem from Spoiler TV said that "the “stagecoach” storyline was really much too predictable to be effective" but she enjoyed the teasing between Nolan and Amanda. She also stated that the most interesting storyline for her, was Irisa's.

Jim Garner from TV Fanatic rated the episode with 4.6/5 stating that the episode continued the trend of excellent Defiance episodes.
