= I Just Wasn't Made for These Times (Defiance) =

- Defiance episode
- Nolan (Grant Bowler) and the astronaut Gordon McClintock (Brian J. Smith)
- Episode no.: Season 1 Episode 8
- Directed by: Allan Kroeker
- Written by: Clark Perry
- Original air date: June 10, 2013

Guest appearances
- Brian J. Smith (Gordon McClintock); Gale Harold (Connor Lang); Brittany Allen (Tirra); Dewshane Williams (Tommy LaSalle); Trenna Keating (Doc Yewll)

Episode chronology
← Previous "Goodbye Blue Sky"	Next → "If I Ever Leave This World Alive"
- Defiance season 1

"I Just Wasn't Made for These Times" is the eighth episode of the first season of the American science fiction series Defiance, and the series' eighth episode overall. It was aired on June 10, 2013. The episode was written by Clark Perry and it was directed by Allan Kroeker.

== Plot ==
Nolan (Grant Bowler) and Tommy (Dewshane Williams) investigate the Arkfall object that fell to Earth in the previous episode. There, they discover a human in hypersleep and when they awake him he is identified as Gordon McClintock (Brian J. Smith), an American astronaut whose space station was supposedly destroyed back in 2013 and the crew presumed dead.

They return with him to Defiance and take him to Doc Yewll's (Trenna Keating) office to be examined. Yewll says that everything is normal but while she is examining him, Gordon has a vision that includes Indogenes, and he pushes her away.

Nolan and Amanda (Julie Benz) take Gordon to Rafe's (Graham Greene) home to stay there for the night and Nolan and Amanda stay there too. During the night, Gordon suffers from another vision and he attacks Amanda trying to kill her, but he is stopped by Nolan, who locks him up.

Upon awakening in the Lawkeeper jail cell, Gordon experiences a third vision and injures himself. When Nolan discovers that Gordon bleeds silver blood, he goes to Yewll to confront her and asks why she failed to report anything odd during Gordon's initial medical examination. Yewll then reveals that the Votans, before their arrival on Earth, had begun a spy and assassin program by kidnapping humans who had access to persons in positions of authority, were extracting their memories and then implanting them into surgically altered Indogene sleeper agents who would replace the real humans. Yewll speculates that Gordon is a prototype.

Gordon, overcome with emotion after hearing this, seizes Nolan's gun and escapes. He enters the McCawley mines, where Rafe finds him. After they have a talk, it is implied that Gordon has committed suicide but later it is revealed that he has left Defiance to reunite with his widow.

In the meantime, Connor Lang (Gale Harold) has returned once again to Defiance to invite Amanda to New York by offering her a job in the Earth Republic government. When Amanda declines his offer, he informs her that she is in danger if she stays in Defiance; the Earth Republic wants control of Defiance and they believe that she is a potential problem, and they will do anything that is necessary to remove her. During their conversation, it is also revealed that they had a relationship in the past.

Meanwhile, Stahma (Jaime Murray) and Kenya (Mia Kirshner) continue their affair. Later, when Datak (Tony Curran) visits Kenya for his usual appointment, Kenya refuses him without providing a satisfactory explanation. Furious, Datak returns home and expresses suspicion to Stahma and Stahma advises Kenya not to refuse him again.

The episode concludes with Nolan confronting Yewll and asking her to tell him everything about the Indogene spy program. Before she can do so, they are interrupted by the arrival of many humans suffering from a hemorrhagic fever.

== Feature music ==
In "I Just Wasn't Made for These Times" we can hear the songs:

- "Man Out of Time" by Elvis Costello
- "Jumbalika" by A. R. Rahman, Alisha Chinai & Shankar Mahadevan

== Reception ==
=== Ratings ===
In its original American broadcast, "I Just Wasn't Made for These Times" was watched by 1.91 million; up 0.22 from the previous episode.

=== Reviews ===
"I Just Wasn't Made for These Times" received positive reviews.

Rowan Kaiser from The A.V. Club gave a B+ grade to the episode saying that the episode took the biggest step away from the show simply being about Defiance. "On its own, “I Just Wasn't Made For These Times” is a perfectly solid hour of television, neither recommendable as fantastic nor worthy of disdain. But I don't think that's the purpose it serves. It's an effective expansion of Defiance's world, connecting the overt story of the show to the background material that only some viewers have. And that material fits well with the show and adds to the storytelling potential of what we might watch, in addition to being interesting on its own."

Lisa Macklem from Spoiler TV stated that overall, she found the episode doing a good job and she is looking forward for the next one. "Overall, I found the episode did a good job of filling out some of the backstory and history that has only been obliquely alluded to up until now."

Jim Garner from TV Fanatic rated the episode with 4/5. "After last week’s less than stellar offering, "I Just Wasn't Made For These Times" drifted back towards the story telling we've gotten to know. While not fully back on solid ground, it did offer a few surprises along the way."
