= Brothers in Arms (Defiance) =

- Defiance episode
- Connor Lang (Gale Harold) comes to Defiance for Pol Madis (Daniel Kash)
- Episode no.: Season 1 Episode 6
- Directed by: Andy Wolk
- Written by: Todd Slavkin; Darren Swimmer
- Original air date: May 20, 2013

Guest appearances
- Gale Harold (Connor Lang); Rob Stewart (Eddie Braddock); Daniel Kash (Pol Madis); Dewshane Williams (Tommy LaSalle); Trenna Keating (Doc Yewll); Justin Rain (Quentin McCawley); Fionnula Flanagan (Nicolette "Nicky" Riordon)

Episode chronology
← Previous "The Serpent's Egg"	Next → "Goodbye Blue Sky"
- Defiance season 1

"Brothers in Arms" is the sixth episode of the first season of the American science fiction series Defiance, and the series' sixth episode overall. It was aired on May 20, 2013. The episode was written by Todd Slavkin & Darren Swimmer and it was directed by Andy Wolk.

== Plot ==
A bounty hunter chases a Castithan through the Defiance marketplace. When the Castithan drops a locket that explodes injuring several people, Nolan knocks him down and arrests him. The bounty hunter turns out to be a friend of Nolan's and former comrade in arms, named Eddie (Rob Stewart). Eddie tries to convince Nolan to give him the outlaw but Nolan takes him under custody instead. Tommy (Dewshane Williams) identifies the Castithan as Pol Madis (Daniel Kash), the person who designs many weapons for wars. Eddie tells Nolan that Earth Republic wants Madis to try him for war crimes.

While Yewll (Trenna Keating) examines Madis, he asks her if people of Defiance know about her involvement in the Pale Wars. He threatens her that if she does not help him escape, then he will tell everyone. Yewll denies any accusations and says that he is confusing her with someone else.

Later, a bag of powder is dropped through the cell window that Madis can use to escape but it is unknown who dropped the bag. Nolan suspects that the person who dropped the bag was Eddie, but Eddie convinces him that he was not involved and they start searching for Madis together.

Meanwhile, an Earth Republic representative, Connor Lang (Gale Harold), arrives in Defiance to take Madis and Amanda (Julie Benz) attempts to negotiate Madis' extradition. Connor, with who Amanda seems she had something in the past, tells her that Earth Republic wants Madis so much that they will tear the city apart just to find him.

Madis, after his escape, goes to Datak's (Tony Curran) house forcing him to help him escape from the town. Datak, not having a second choice, drives him out of Defiance, but they are stopped by Nolan, Irisa (Stephanie Leonidas), Tommy and Eddie. Irisa and Tommy drive Datak back home and Nolan stays back with Eddie and Madis. Nolan plans to give Madis to Eddie but when he learns that Earth Republic does not really want Madis to try him but to use him for making new weapons, he kills him. Connor arrives at the scene and when he sees that Madis is dead he tells Nolan that this is not his jurisdiction. Eddie takes the blame of Madis' death and is arrested.

Meanwhile, Quentin (Justin Rain) studies the book and the artifacts his brother left behind to understand what Luke was trying to do. Nicky (Fionnula Flanagan) sees him and she shows interest in his findings. When Quentin tells his dad Rafe (Graham Greene) about it, Rafe advises him to destroy the book, the artifacts and everything that has to do with this subject because they are the reason his brother is dead. Quentin is willing to do so, but when he has a vision of his brother telling him not to, he changes his mind and keeps the artifact.

In the meantime, Birch (Steven McCarthy) breaks into Rafe's house to find the artifact. When Quentin gets back home, they struggle and Quentin kills him, egged on by another vision of his brother Luke.

The episode ends with Nolan telling Irisa more about her "Uncle" Eddie; Quentin disposing of Birch's body in the mines; and Eddie being transported in shackles by Earth Republic forces. We see that Eddie has a bag of powder like the one Madis used to escape hidden in his boot that now he uses to escape.

== Feature music ==
In the "Brothers in Arms" we can hear the songs:

- "Have You Ever Seen the Rain?" by Sass Jordan
- "I Belong To You (1945)" by Mallory Sands
- ""Have You Ever Seen the Rain?" by Joan Jett

== Reception ==
=== Ratings ===
In its original American broadcast, "Brothers in Arms" was watched by 1.95 million; slightly down by 0.03 from the previous episode.

=== Reviews ===
"Brothers in Arms" received positive reviews.

Rowan Kaiser from The A.V. Club gave a B+ grade to the episode saying that the episode does quite well at creating ethical dilemmas for the characters and that it continues last week's improvement in structural competence. "One infuriating moment aside, I found a lot to like about “Brothers In Arms.” A television show isn't just about its grand, overall story. It's about how it builds its world, develops its characters, and structures its episodic stories. Defiance is doing well enough at that, especially early in a science fiction drama's run, so I'm willing to forgive brief dalliances with shitty mythology."

Lisa Macklem from Spoiler TV stated that the show consistently excels at teasing out exposition without feeling like they’re doing it. "I thought this week’s episode was pretty solid. It was much more tightly plotted and once again delivered some great performances. The characters continue to grow on my, and that is really what keeps me coming back to a show."

Jim Garner from TV Fanatic rated the episode with 4.6/5 stating that overall it was a very enjoyable episode. "It’s become clearer each week that the relationship Nolan and Irisa possess is deeper and more complex than what you get at first glance."
