= The Bride Wore Black (disambiguation) =

The Bride Wore Black is a 1968 French film based on the 1940 novel, directed by François Truffaut.

The Bride Wore Black may also refer to:

- The Bride Wore Black (novel), a 1940 American novel written by Cornell Woolrich
- The Bride Wore Black (Defiance), the 10th episode of the first season of the American science fiction series Defiance
