= The Lost Ones =

Lost Ones or The Lost Ones may refer to:

== Film and television ==
- The Lost One (German: Der Verlorene), a 1951 West German film starring and directed by Peter Lorre
- The Lost One (film), an alternate title for the 1947 Italian film The Lady of the Camellias
- Defiance: The Lost Ones, a five-part series of minisodes released in 2014 on Syfy.com
- "The Lost One" (Star Wars: The Clone Wars)

== Literature ==
- The Lost Ones (Beckett), English translation of Samuel Beckett's 1970 short story Le dépeupleur
- The Lost Ones (by Javellana), alternative title for Stevan Javellana's 1947 Filipino war-time novel, Without Seeing the Dawn
- The Lost Ones (novel), novel by Ian Cameron, later made into a 1974 Disney movie The Island at the Top of the World
- The Lost Ones (Tristan), Frédérick Tristan's 1983 Prix Goncourt winning novel Les égarés
- The Lost Ones (comic), 2008 comic series

== Music ==
- The Lost Ones (album), a 2024 album by Florrie
- "Lost Ones" (Lauryn Hill song), 1998
- "The Lost Ones" (Ted Hawkins song), 1982
- "Lost One" a 2006 single by Jay-Z
- ”Lost Ones”, a song by J Cole from the album Cole World: The Sideline Story, 2011
- The Lost Ones, the third disc of Enigma's compilation box set, The Platinum Collection
