= Omar Madha =

Television director

- Born: 1968 (age 57–58); Dublin, Ireland
- Education: University of Leeds
- Occupations: Television director, producer
- Years active: 1993–present

Omar Madha is a British television director and producer. He has directed numerous episodes of British television such as Hollyoaks, Spooks and Law & Order: UK as well as American television such as Law & Order: Criminal Intent, Big Love and Caprica.

== Filmography ==
- Hollyoaks
- Attachments
- Clocking Off
- Rose and Maloney
- Love My Way
- Spooks
- Burn Up
- Law & Order: UK
- Paradox
- Law & Order: Criminal Intent
- Caprica
- Big Love
- Outcasts
- Hellcats
- Covert Affairs
- Grimm
- Defiance
- The 100
- 24: Live Another Day
- Stalker
- The Blacklist
- Code Black
- MacGyver
- Turn: Washington's Spies
- Lethal Weapon
- S.W.A.T.
- The Rookie
- Another Life
- Prodigal Son
- Doom Patrol
- Star Trek: Discovery
- Reacher (TV series)
- The Endgame
- CSI: Vegas
