= Michael Nankin =

American screenwriter and director

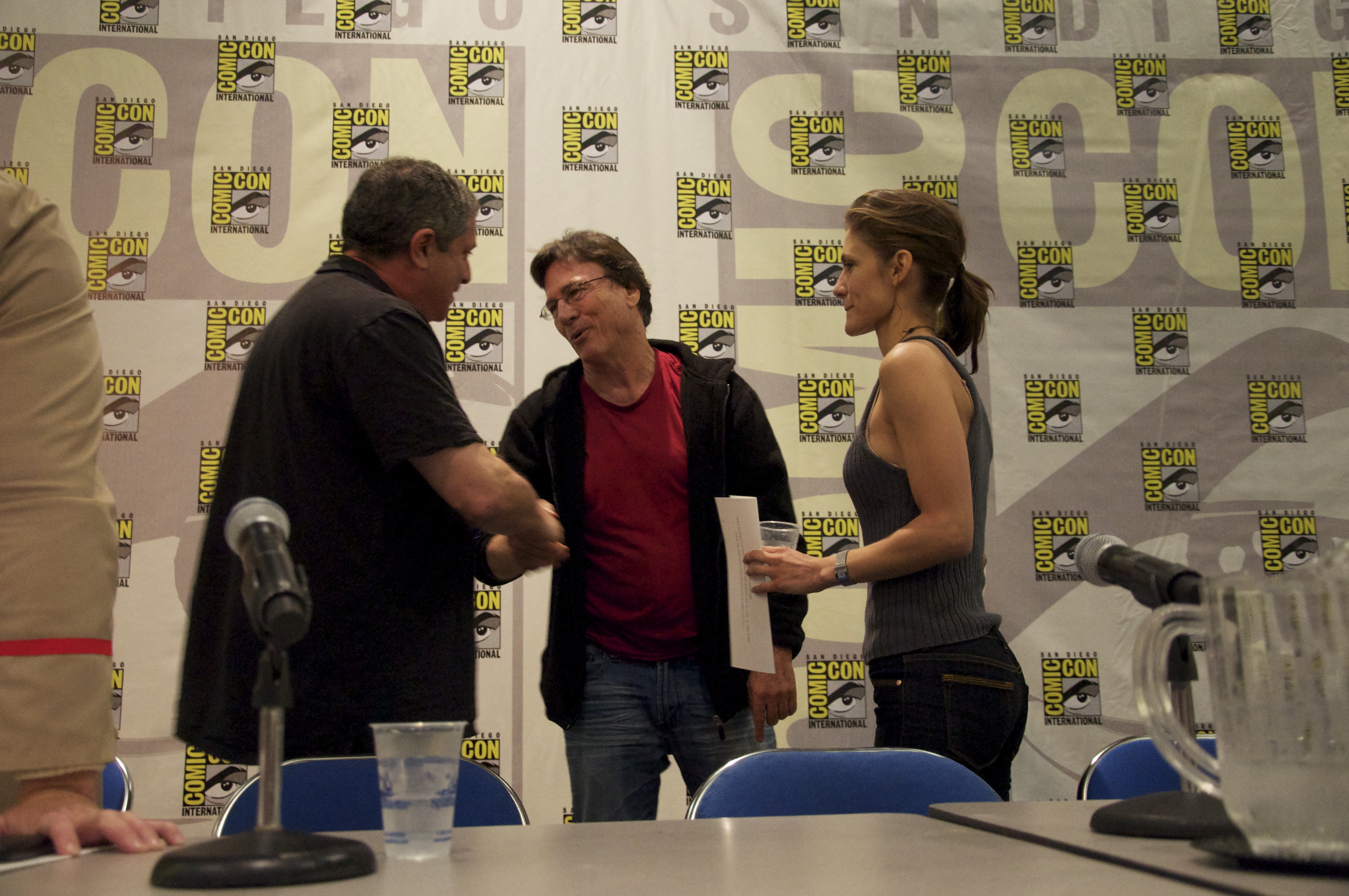
- Nankin (left) with Richard Hatch and Lili Bordán at San Diego Comic-Con, 2011
- Born: December 26, 1955 (age 70); United States
- Occupations: Writer; director; producer

Michael Nankin (born December 26, 1955) is an American film and television writer, director and producer. He was nominated for the Humanitas Prize for his writing.

== Career ==
Nankin's film career began in 1976 with a short film called Gravity. He co-wrote and co-directed the project with David Wechter. They followed it with another short, Junior High School. They produced their first feature-length project in 1980, a comedy called Midnight Madness. Nankin scripted a horror film called The Gate which was released in 1987. The film marked the acting debut of Stephen Dorff. In the same year Nankin received a screenplay credit for Russkies. In 1989 he wrote a sequel to The Gate entitled The Gate II: Trespassers.

Nankin became involved in television as a director, writer, and producer on Life Goes On in 1990. The series was created by Michael Braverman and is about a family of four from suburban Chicago. Nankin joined the series in its second season as a producer. He was promoted to supervising producer for the third season and then to co-executive producer for the fourth season. He scripted nine episodes of the series before its cancellation in 1993. He directed eight episodes of the series. Nankin also wrote for Picket Fences in 1992. In 1994 he became a consulting producer, writer, and director for Chicago Hope. Nankin was nominated for a Humanitas Prize in the 60 minute category for his work on the Chicago Hope episode "Shutt Down" (co-written with Braverman). Nankin returned to Picket Fences as a director and producer in 1995, directing an episode. He wrote the story for a pilot episode for a new version of Flipper but was not involved with the ongoing series which followed.

Nankin was a writer and director for American Gothic in 1995 and 1996. He wrote and directed the episode "Potato Boy" and directed a second episode. He directed episodes of Moloney and Early Edition in 1996. He was a co-executive producer on the action series Roar in 1997. He wrote one episode and directed one episode of the series, which starred Heath Ledger. Only 13 episodes were produced and the second half of the series did not air until 2000.

In 2000 Nankin directed episodes of Strong Medicine and Cover Me: Based on the True Life of an FBI Family. In 2001 he directed the TV movie The Agency and several episodes of the series which came after the film. In 2002 he directed the pilot episode for a series called Septuplets. Nankin was credited as an executive producer. The pilot was not picked up by a network. He directed episodes of Monk in 2002. In 2004 Nankin served as a consulting producer for the short lived WB family drama The Mountain. He wrote one episode of the series. He directed episodes of Veritas: The Quest and Invasion in 2005.

He worked as a regular director for the reimagined Battlestar Galactica. His involvement with the series began in 2005 with the second season and he directed eight episodes before it ended in 2009. He often worked alongside writing team Bradley Thompson and David Weddle and five of his eight episodes were scripted by Weddle and Thompson. While working on Battlestar Galactica, Nankin directed episodes of The Dresden Files, Terminator: The Sarah Connor Chronicles, and Eureka. He directed the TV movie Break-In in 2006.

In 2009 Nankin followed Thompson and Weddle from Battlestar Galactica to CSI: Crime Scene Investigation and he directed the twentieth episode of the ninth season. In 2020, Nankin directed an episode on The Good Lord Bird. The 2022 Lifetime film, An Amish Sin, was directed by Nankin.
