= Mia Kirshner =

Canadian actress (born 1975)

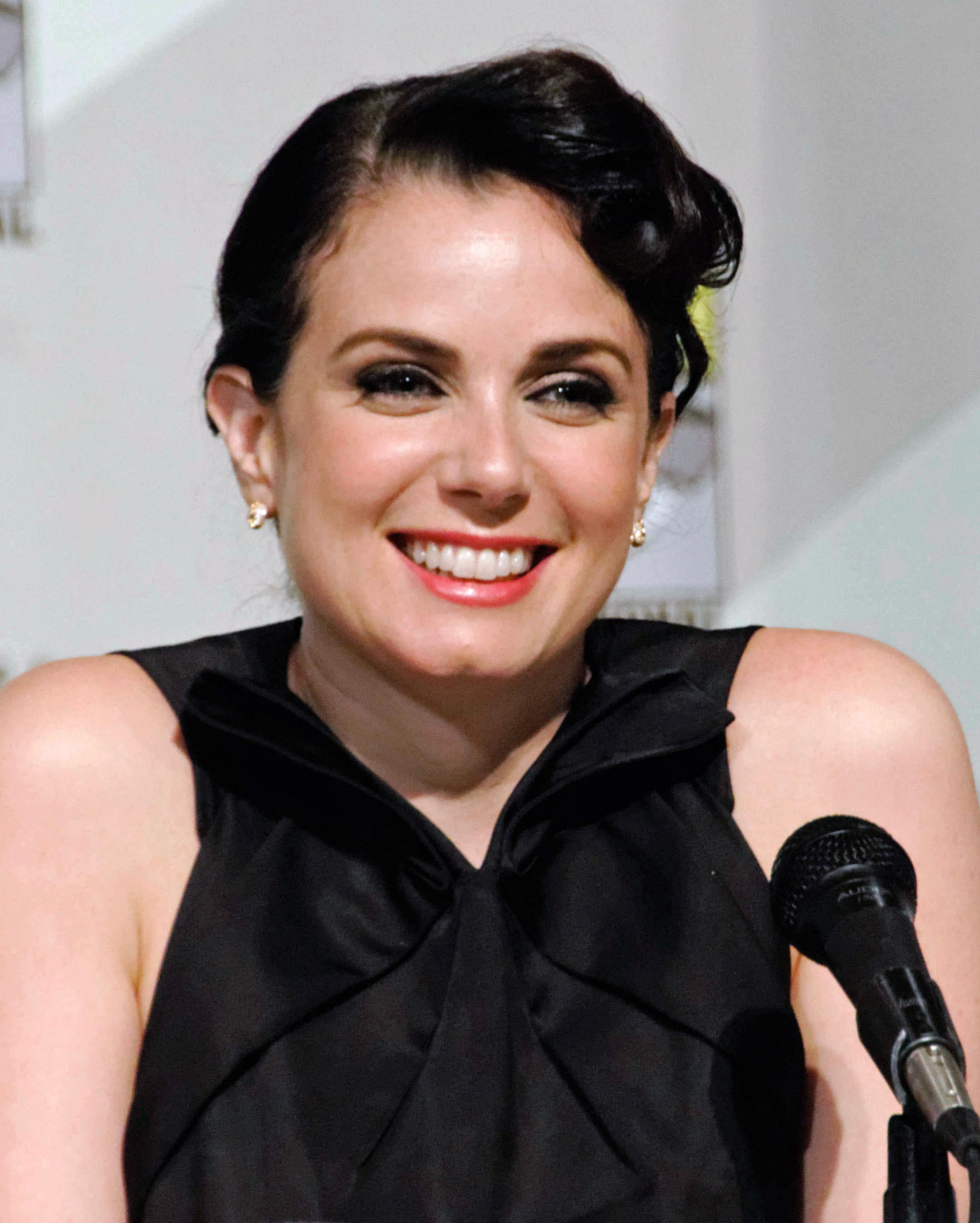
- Kirshner at the 2012 San Diego Comic-Con
- Born: January 25, 1975 (age 51); Toronto, Ontario, Canada
- Occupations: Actress; activist; writer
- Years active: 1989–present
- Partner: Sam Shepard (2014–2015)

Mia Kirshner (born January 25, 1975) is a Canadian actress, writer, and social activist. She is known for television roles as Mandy in 24 (2001–2005), as Jenny Schecter in The L Word (2004–2009), as Amanda Grayson in Star Trek: Discovery (2017–2019) and Star Trek: Strange New Worlds (2023), and as Isobel Flemming in The Vampire Diaries (2010–2011). Her film credits include Love and Human Remains (1993), Exotica (1994), The Crow: City of Angels (1996), Mad City (1997), Not Another Teen Movie (2001), and The Black Dahlia (2006).

== Early life ==
Kirshner was born in Toronto, Ontario, Canada, the daughter of Etti (Henrietta), a teacher, and Sheldon Kirshner, a journalist who wrote for The Canadian Jewish News. Kirshner is a granddaughter of Holocaust survivors; her father was born in the displaced persons camp at Bad Reichenhall in Germany in 1946; and met Kirshner's mother, a Bulgarian Jewish refugee (of Sephardi Jewish descent), after they immigrated to Israel. Kirshner's paternal grandparents were Polish Jews (of Ashkenazi Jewish descent). Kirshner had a middle class upbringing, and attended Forest Hill Collegiate Institute but later graduated from Jarvis Collegiate Institute. Kirshner studied Russian literature and the 20th-century movie industry at McGill University in Montreal. Her younger sister, Lauren Kirshner, a writer, was involved in the I Live Here project.

== Career ==
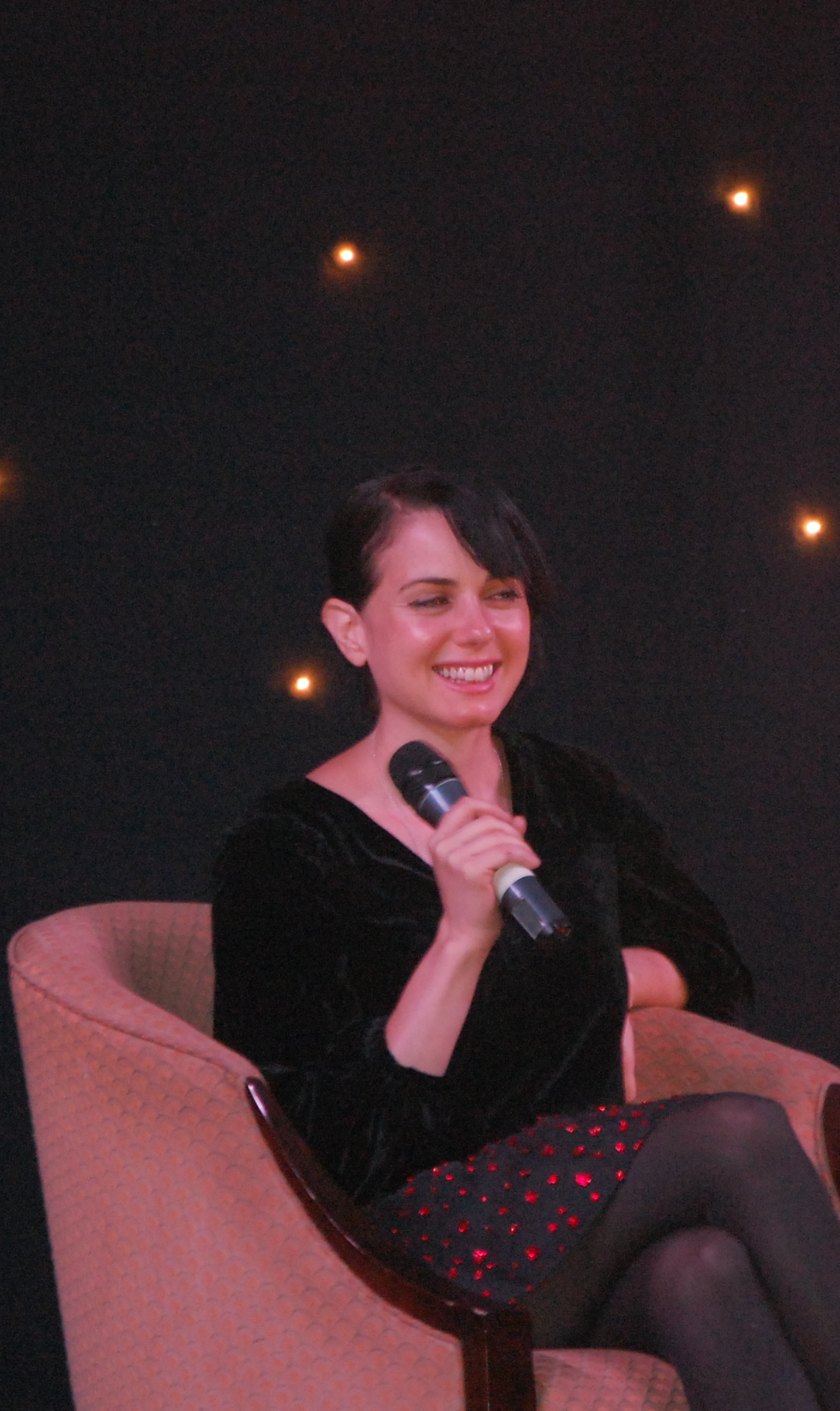
Kirshner in 2009

Kirshner started her career in 1989 in "Loving the Alien", a second-season episode of War of the Worlds, as both Jo, a young resistance fighter who is captured and duplicated by the enemy aliens, and her doppelgänger. Kirshner made her film debut in 1993 at the age of 18 in Denys Arcand's Love and Human Remains. She convinced her father to sign a "nudity waiver" to play a dominatrix. The following year, she starred as a conflicted exotic dancer in Atom Egoyan's Exotica. In 1996, she appeared in The Crow: City of Angels. She also played Kitty Scherbatsky in the 1997 version of Anna Karenina.

Kirshner also appeared in the first three episodes of 24 as the assassin Mandy in 2001. She would later reprise the role for the second season's finale and in the latter half of the show's fourth season. Also in 2001, Kirshner played Catherine Wyler, "The Cruelest Girl in School", in Not Another Teen Movie. The character is primarily a spoof of Kathryn Merteuil (played by Sarah Michelle Gellar) in Cruel Intentions, and was partially based on Mackenzie Siler (played by Anna Paquin) from She's All That. In Marilyn Manson's music video for "Tainted Love", which was featured on the movie's soundtrack, she made a cameo appearance as her character Catherine Wyler.

In 2004, Kirshner was cast as writer Jenny Schecter, a main character in the drama series The L Word. She remained with the show through 2009, for all six seasons.

In 2006, she starred in Brian De Palma's The Black Dahlia in which she plays the young aspiring actress Elizabeth Short, whose mutilation and murder in 1947 remains unsolved. While the film itself was critically panned, many reviews singled out her performance for acclaim. Stephanie Zacharek of Salon.com, in a largely negative review, notes that the eponymous character was "played wonderfully by Mia Kirshner..." Mick LaSalle wrote that Kirshner "makes a real impression of the Dahlia as a sad, lonely dreamer, a pathetic figure." J. R. Jones described her performance as "haunting" and that the film's fictional screen tests "deliver the emotional darkness so lacking in the rest of the movie." In 2010, Kirshner co-starred in the film 30 Days of Night: Dark Days which began filming in the fall of 2009. In 2010, she was cast as Isobel Flemming, a guest role on The Vampire Diaries.

In 2011, she voiced the title character in Bear 71, a National Film Board of Canada web documentary that premiered at the Sundance Film Festival.

On April 20, 2012, it was announced that Kirshner would join the new Syfy series Defiance.

On October 9, 2013, it was mentioned on the Showcase blog that Kirshner would be one of several guest stars in season four of the television series Lost Girl.

From 2017 to 2019, she played the recurring role of Amanda Grayson, mother of Spock and foster mother of series protagonist Michael Burnham on Star Trek: Discovery (a role originated by Jane Wyatt on the original Star Trek). She later reprised the role in an episode of Star Trek: Strange New Worlds.

On September 5, 2019, Entertainment Tonight's news outlet ET Online reported that Kirshner would play a character in Lifetime's film The College Admissions Scandal with co-star Penelope Ann Miller in roles inspired by real-life actresses Lori Loughlin's and Felicity Huffman's involvement in a massive college admissions bribery scam. Describing her role, Kirshner was quoted saying "This story is about privilege and corruption and it's about people who don't follow the rules because they think they're above rules... My character [based on Loughlin but named "Bethany" in the film] is so corrupt, greedy, narcissistic, self-centered, and the dialogue is hilarious, so I'm glad that they're able to capture humor about this as well."

In September 2020, it was announced that Kirshner would co-star with Ben Savage in a Hallmark Channel holiday film entitled Love, Lights, Hanukkah!, which premiered on December 12, 2020. Kirshner plays a restaurant owner named Christina, who learns of her Jewish ancestry through a DNA test.

== Philanthropy ==
In October 2008, after seven years in production, Kirshner published the book I Live Here, which she co-produced with ex-Adbusters staffers Paul Shoebridge and Michael Simons, as well as writer James MacKinnon. In the book, four different groups of women and children refugees from places such as Chechnya, Juárez, Burma and Malawi tell their life stories. The book features original material from comic and graphic artists including Joe Sacco and Phoebe Gloeckner. It was published in the U.S. by Random House/Pantheon. It was supported logistically by Amnesty International, which will receive proceeds from the book. After the release of the book, the Center for International Studies at MIT invited Kirshner to run a four-week course on I Live Here in January 2009.

== In popular culture ==
Kirshner was ranked #43 on the Maxim Hot 100 Women of 2002. She and Beverly Polcyn were nominated for Best Kiss at the 2002 MTV Movie Awards for Not Another Teen Movie. In 2011, it was announced that Kirshner would be the face of Monica Rich Kosann's jewellery collection.

== Personal life ==
Kirshner was in a relationship with actor and playwright Sam Shepard from 2014 to 2015.

== Filmography ==
=== Film ===
Year	Title	Role	Notes
1993	Love and Human Remains	Benita	
1993	Cadillac Girls	Page	
1994	Exotica	Christina	
1995	Murder in the First	Rosetta Young	
1995	The Grass Harp	Maude Riordan	
1996	The Crow: City of Angels	Sarah Mohr	
1997	Anna Karenina	Kitty	
1997	Mad City	Laurie Callahan	
1999	Speed of Life	Sarah	
1999	Out of the Cold	Deborah Berkowitz	
2000	Innocents	Dominique Denright	
2000	Cowboys and Angels	Candice	
2001	Century Hotel	Dominique	
2001	According to Spencer	Melora	
2001	Not Another Teen Movie	Catherine Wyler	
2002	New Best Friend	Alicia Campbell	
2002	Now & Forever	Angela Wilson	
2003	Party Monster	Natasha Gatien	
2005	The Iris Effect	Rebecca	
2006	The Black Dahlia	Elizabeth Short	
2008	Miss Conception	Clem	
2010	30 Days of Night: Dark Days	Lilith	Direct-to-video film
2011	388 Arletta Avenue	Amy Walker	
2012	The Barrens	Cynthia Vineyard	
2013	I Think I Do	Julia	
2016	Milton's Secret	Jane Adams	
2017	A Swinger's Weekend	Fiona	
2021	Crisis	Susan Reimann	

=== Television ===
Year	Title	Role	Notes
1989	War of the Worlds	Jo Crane	Episode: "Loving the Alien"
1990	Danger Bay	Catherine Walker	Episode: "Live Wires"
1990–1991	Dracula: The Series	Sophie Metternich	Main role
1991	E.N.G.	Risa Timerman	Episode: "Suffer the Little Children"
1991	My Secret Identity	Alana Porter	Episode: "My Other Secret Identity"
1991–1992	Tropical Heat	Cathy Paige / Sandy	2 episodes: "Runaway" , "Stranger in Paradise"
1992	Road to Avonlea	Emily Everett-Smythe	Episode: "High Society"
1992	Are You Afraid of the Dark?	Pam / Dora Pease	Episode: "The Tale of the Hungry Hounds"
1995	Johnny's Girl	Amy Ross	Television film
2001–2002	Wolf Lake	Ruby Cates	Main role
2001–2005	24	Mandy	Recurring role
2004–2009	The L Word	Jenny Schecter	Main role
2007	They Come Back	Faith Hardy	Television film
2009	The Cleaner	April May	Episode: "Does Everybody Have a Drink?"
2009	CSI: NY	Deborah Carter	Episode: "Dead Reckoning"
2010–2011	The Vampire Diaries	Isobel Flemming	Recurring role (seasons 1–2)
2012	Kiss at Pine Lake	Zoe McDowell	Television film
2013	The Surrogacy Trap	Christy Bennett	Television film
2013	Graceland	Ashika Pearl	Episode: "Pizza Box"
2013	Lost Girl	Clio	Episodes: "In Memoriam", "Sleeping Beauty School", "Lovers. Apart."
2013–2014	Defiance	Kenya Rosewater	Main role
2015	Bloodline	Sarah Rayburn	3 episodes
2015	Reluctant Witness	Erin Villenueve	Television film
2016	Real Detective	Detective Mannina	Episode: "No One Is Safe"
2017–2019	Star Trek: Discovery	Amanda Grayson	Recurring role
2019	The College Admissions Scandal	Bethany Slade	Television film
2020	Love, Lights, Hanukkah!	Christina	Hallmark Television film
2023	Star Trek: Strange New Worlds	Amanda Grayson	Episode: "Charades"

=== Video games ===
- 24: The Game (2006), as Mandy
