= Jesse Rath =

Canadian actor

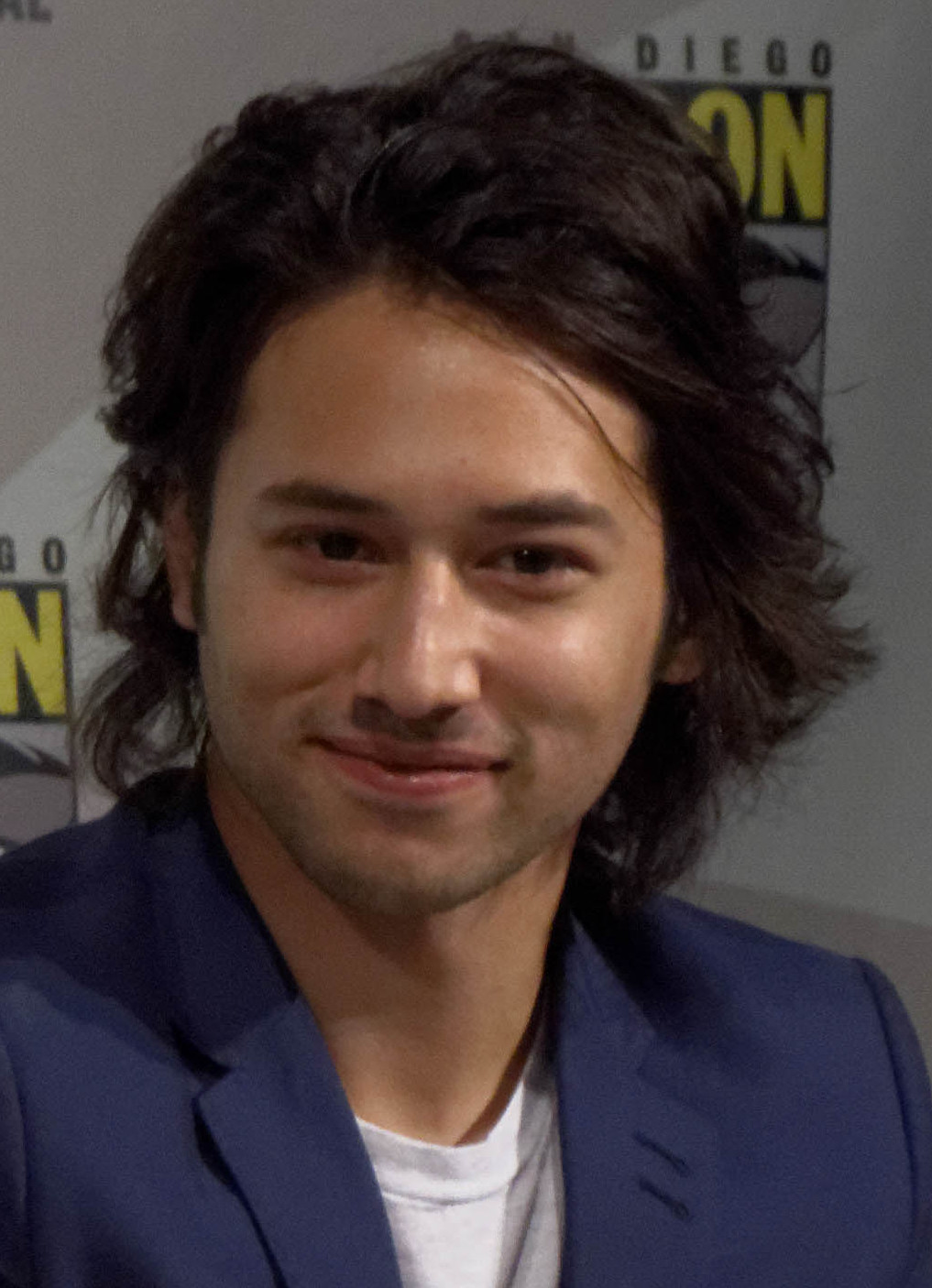
- Rath in 2013
- Born: February 11, 1989 (age 37); Montreal, Quebec, Canada
- Occupation: Actor
- Years active: 2005–present
- Relatives: Meaghan Rath (sister)

Jesse Rath (born February 11, 1989) is a Canadian actor. He starred in the television series 18 to Life as Carter Boyd and as Ram on Aaron Stone. He also appeared on the Syfy series Defiance playing the role of Alak Tarr, on Being Human as Robbie Malik and on Supergirl as Brainiac 5.

== Life and career ==
Rath was born in Montreal, Quebec, Canada. His mother is of Goan Indian descent, whereas his father is of English and Austrian-Jewish heritage. His older sister is actress Meaghan Rath.

Rath's first role was in 2005, as a runner in the sports film The Greatest Game Ever Played, and he later joined a low-budget film, Prom Wars: Love Is a Battlefield, followed by The Trotsky. He got his biggest break on television in 2009 after getting cast in the miniseries Assassin's Creed: Lineage, playing Federico Auditore, the role of one of the sons of the lead character, Giovanni. The same year, he was cast in a recurring role in the Disney XD show Aaron Stone. He was then cast as one of the main leads in the CBC show 18 to Life. He starred in a direct-to-video film, The Howling: Reborn. He later joined another Canadian series, Mudpit. He also guest-starred on Being Human, playing the role of the younger brother of the female lead, portrayed by Meaghan Rath. In mid-2012, he was cast in the science fiction television series Defiance.

He was co-nominated for two Gemini Awards in 2010 and 2011, for Best Ensemble Performance in a Comedy Program or Series, for 18 to Life. From 2018 to 2021, Rath portrayed Brainiac 5 in Supergirl.

== Filmography ==
Film appearances by Jesse Rath
Year	Title	Role	Notes
2005	The Greatest Game Ever Played	Runner	Independent film
2008	Prom Wars: Love Is a Battlefield	Francis	
2009	The Trotsky	Dwight	
2009	Assassin's Creed: Lineage	Federico Auditore	Short film
2011	The Howling: Reborn	Sachin	
2012	The Good Lie	Jesse	Independent film
2019	Jay and Silent Bob Reboot	French Canadian Blunt-Fan	Cameo

Television appearances by Jesse Rath
Year	Title	Role	Notes
2009	Dead Like Me: Life After Death	Boy teenager	Television film
2009–2010	Aaron Stone	Ram	Recurring role
2010–2011	18 to Life	Carter Boyd	Main role
2012–2013	Mudpit	Liam/Lamb	Main role
2012	My Babysitter's a Vampire	Hottie Hotep	Guest (1 episode)
2013	His Turn	Dicko	Television film
2013–2014	Being Human	Robbie Malik	Guest (4 episodes)
2013–2015	Defiance	Alak Tarr	Recurring role (season 1); main role (seasons 2–3)
2016	Code Black	James	Episode: “Hail Mary”
2016	19-2	Owen	Guest (4 episodes)
2016	The Brief	Austin	Miniseries
2016–2017	No Tomorrow	Timothy	Main role
2018–2021	Supergirl	Querl Dox / Brainiac 5	Recurring role (season 3); main role (season 4–6)
2018	Gone	Agent Riggs	Episode: "Exigent Circumstances"
2022	S.W.A.T.	Kahn	Episode: "Donor"
2024	Accused	Jeffrey Wexler	Episode: "Margot's Story"
2025	Children Ruin Everything	Amit/Luke	Episode: "Adulthood"
2026	Doc	Cody Hansen	Episode: "Orientation" Episode 18 of season 2

== Awards and nominations ==
Year	Award	Category	Nominated work	Result	Ref.
2010	Gemini Award	Best Ensemble Performance in a Comedy Program or Series	18 to Life	Nominated	
2011	Gemini Award	Best Ensemble Performance in a Comedy Program or Series	18 to Life	Nominated	
2017	Canadian Screen Awards	Best Performance by an Actor in a Program or Series Produced for Digital Media	The Brief	Nominated	
