= Trenna Keating =

Canadian actress (born 1987)

- Born: January 23, 1987 (age 39); Weyburn, Saskatchewan, Canada
- Education: University of Regina
- Occupation: Actress
- Years active: 2005–present

Trenna Keating (born January 23, 1987) is a Canadian actress known for her recurring role as Doc Yewll in Defiance, between 2013 and 2015.

== Early life ==
Trenna Keating was born and grew up in Weyburn, Saskatchewan. She likes spending her time hiking and camping outdoors, loves cooking, playing games and dancing. Keating is also a passioned writer of plays. Keating did her BFA degree in acting at the University of Regina.

== Career ==
When she moved to Toronto, Keating studied clown for a while, and began working as a reader for auditions as her introduction to the Toronto film industry. Keating spent several years working at the theatre and doing crew work in film productions, as background casting director, casting assistant and casting director. On occasion of an interview, she told that most of what I have learned about acting has come from being on the other side of the camera watching actors work.

Keating first appeared in the American romantic comedy and Christmas film Just Friends in 2005, and thenafter in Canadian television series and television films, among them Renegadepress.com, Corner Gas and Combat Hospital in recurring roles. Her probably best known role is the recurring character Doc Yewll in the US-Canadian SciFi-series Defiance that started broadcast in 2013 and was renewed for a third, and last season; Defiance was cancelled by ScyFy on October 16, 2015.

== Filmography ==
Year	Title	Role	Notes
2005	Just Friends	Nancy	
2006	Prairie Giant: The Tommy Douglas Story	KOD Lady #2	Miniseries
2006	The Velvet Devil	Stage Manager	TV film
2006–2007	Renegadepress.com	Nurse/waitress	"The Real Story: Reacting to Death and Grieving", "Fear" & "Third Wheel"
2007	Like Lovers	Andrea	Short
2008	Rabbit Fall	Karen Shade	"Emancipation"
2007–2009	Corner Gas	Girl Circa 1984, "Perfect Woman" & "Sensitivity Student"	"Lacey Borrows", "Top Gum" & "Super Sensitive"
2009	A Dog Named Christmas	Faye McCray	TV film
2009	Little Mosque on the Prairie	Waitress	"True Bro-mance"
2011	Combat Hospital	Sgt. Hannah Corday	10 episodes
2013	Cracked	Ident Officer	"The Hold Out" & "Voices"
2013–2015	Defiance	Doc Yewll	34 episodes
2014	Working the Engels	Receptionist	"Jenna vs. Big Pastry"
2014	The Listener	Detective Nesmith	"An Innocent Man"
2014	Murdoch Mysteries	Kathleen King	"On the Waterfront: Part 1" & "On the Waterfront: Part 2"
2015	Schitt's Creek	Crystal	"Wine and Roses"
2015	Bark Ranger	Lisa Cratchley	TV film
2015	Orphan Black	Vera	"The Weight of This Combination", "Formalized, Complex, and Costly" & "Community of Dreadful Fear and Hate"
2016	12 Monkeys	Nurse 1	"Emergence"
2016	Dark Matter	Felicia Brand	"Welcome to Your New Home"
2016	Private Eyes	Taylor Larson	"Mise en Place"
2017	Cardinal	Kristin Baldwin	"Cardinal", "Woody" & "Keith"
2017	Reign	Lady Palmerton	"Uncharted Waters"
2017	Away Home	Isla McNeil	Short
2018	Workin' Moms	Shanon	"The Sign", "Red Handed" & "Cuck"
2018	Ransom	Simone Merriweather	Promised Land
2018	Good Witch	Realtor	"Tossing The Bouquet"
2018	Anne with an E	Mrs. Pye	7 episodes
2021-2022	The Mysterious Benedict Society	Dr. Garrison	Recurring
2023	Painkiller	Deborah Marlowe	3 episodes
