= Tony Curran =

Scottish actor

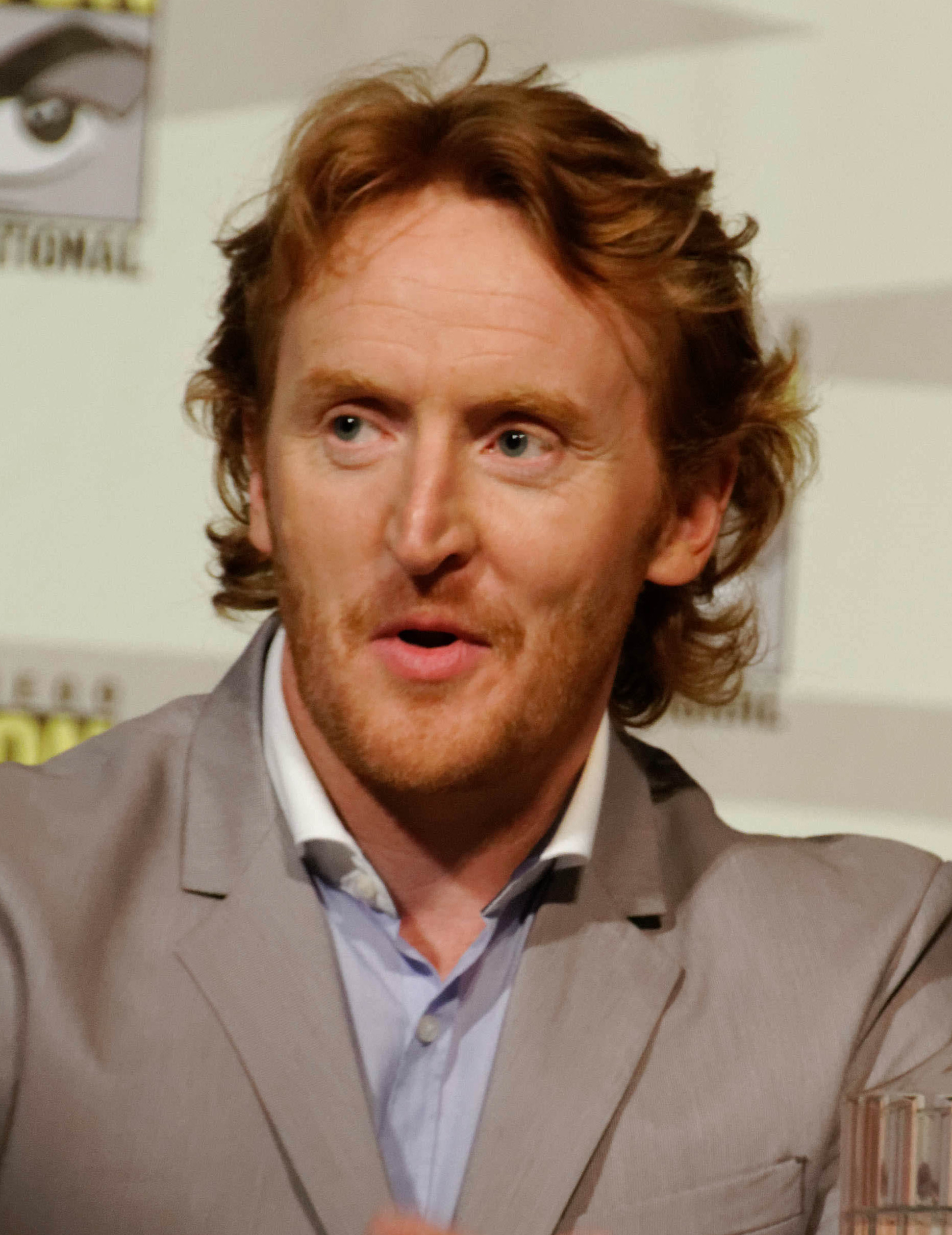
- Curran at the Defiance panel during the 2013 SDCC
- Born: Glasgow, Scotland
- Education: Royal Conservatoire of Scotland
- Occupation: Actor
- Years active: 1985–present
- Spouse: Mai Nguyen (m. 2012)
- Children: 1

Tony Curran is a Scottish actor who has appeared in the film Underworld: Evolution (2006), the television series Doctor Who (2010), the miniseries Roots (2016), and the Netflix historical drama film Outlaw King (2018). He appears in different minor roles in Marvel Cinematic Universe productions, including the film Thor: The Dark World (2013), the second season of the Netflix series Daredevil (2016), and the Disney+ miniseries Secret Invasion (2023). In late 2022, Curran starred in the BBC drama Mayflies. In the 2025 Starz streaming series Outlander: Blood of My Blood, he appears as Simon Fraser, Lord Lovat.

== Education ==
Curran is a graduate of the Royal Scottish Academy of Music and Drama.

== Career ==
Curran appeared in the BBC television series This Life. Since then, he has appeared in a number of major film and television roles, including Rodney Skinner (The Invisible Man), an original character in The League of Extraordinary Gentlemen. To portray the Invisible Man, he donned a special suit that turned him into a walking bluescreen. (According to his commentary on the DVD, he looked like a "smurf on acid".) He also played vampire roles in Guillermo del Toro's Blade II as Priest and Underworld: Evolution as Markus. In 2006 he appeared in the unrated film Red Road.

Curran played the role of Datak Tarr on the Syfy series Defiance and in 2014, he costarred with Diana Vickers in the thriller film Awaiting. In 2016 Curran signed to play 'Callum' in the new E4/Netflix original series Crazyhead.

Curran portrayed Vincent van Gogh in the science fiction television series Doctor Who. The episode, written by Richard Curtis, was rated by Screen Rant as the best of Matt Smith's time as the Doctor. A scene where Curran plays van Gogh, taken into the future to see his work in a modern museum, has been described as one of the most emotional in the entire series. Curran also made a cameo appearance in the Doctor Who episode "The Pandorica Opens".

In 2002, Curran played Sgt. Pete Twamley in the ITV series Ultimate Force, which was broadcast in over 100 countries. Curran later worked in season 8 of The Flash where he portrayed Despero in his human form and voiced him in his true alien form starting in the five-part episode "Armageddon". He starred in the 2018 film Outlaw King, alongside Chris Pine, Aaron Taylor-Johnson, and Florence Pugh.

His lead performance in the poignant 2022 BBC drama Mayflies was described by The Guardian as "devastating". In 2023, he joined the Marvel Cinematic Universe, playing a Skrull infiltrator who had assumed the identity of Derrik Weatherby, "C" of the British Secret Intelligence Service (a.k.a. MI6) in the series Secret Invasion.

== Personal life ==
In 2012, he married Mai Nguyen; the couple have a daughter. Curran has campaigned for charities and was named as an official ambassador of the Celtic F.C. Foundation.

== Awards ==
- Evening News National Award — for the role of Devil in the theatre production The Soldier's Tale
- Best Actor at the 2006 British Independent Film Awards for his role in Andrea Arnold's Red Road.
- BAFTA Scotland 2006 — Best Actor

== Filmography ==
=== Film ===
Year	Title	Role	Notes
1993	Being Human	Raider	
1994	Shallow Grave	Travel Agent	
1994	Captives	Spider	
1995	Go Now	Chris Cameron	
1999	The Magical Legend of the Leprechauns	Sean Devine	
1999	The 13th Warrior	Weath the Musician	
2000	Gladiator	Assassin No. 1	
2001	Pearl Harbor	Ian	
2002	Blade II	Priest	
2003	The League of Extraordinary Gentlemen	Rodney Skinner (The Invisible Man)	
2004	Flight of the Phoenix	Rodney	
2005	Beowulf & Grendel	Hondscioh	
2006	Underworld: Evolution	Markus Corvinus	
2006	Red Road	Clyde Henderson	
2006	Miami Vice	Aryan Brother	As Anthony Curran
2006	The Good German	Danny	
2007	Trust Me	Miles Loncrain	
2008	Shuttle	Driver	
2008	The Midnight Meat Train	Driver	
2008	The Lazarus Project	William Reeds	
2009	A Day in the Life	Dr. Reynolds	
2009	Ondine	Alex	
2009	Corrado	Officer Tony	
2010	The Presence	The Man in Black	
2010	Golf in the Kingdom	Adam Green	
2011	The Adventures of Tintin: The Secret of the Unicorn	Lt. Delcourt	
2011	Big Mommas: Like Father, Like Son	Chirkoff	
2011	Cat Run	Sean Moody	
2011	The Veteran	Chris Turner	
2011	Two-Legged Rat Bastards	Desoto	Short
2011	Crossmaglen	Dermot McGarvey	
2011	The Last Best Place	Fletcher	
2011	X-Men: First Class	Man in Black Agent	
2012	In the Dark Half	Filthy	
2013	Mary Queen of Scots	Knox	
2013	Thor: The Dark World	Bor	Uncredited
2014	Postman Pat: The Movie	Paparazzi 2 (voice)	
2014	The Seventeenth Kind	James	Short
2015	Awaiting	Morris	
2016	Race	Lawson Robertson	
2017	Eat Locals	Peter Boniface	
2018	Calibre	Logan	
2018	Outlaw King	Angus Macdonald	

=== Television ===
Year	Title	Role	Notes
1986–1987	Dramarama	Archie Campbell / Jason	2 episodes
1992	Strathblair	Ian	Episode #2.6
1994	The Tales of Para Handy	Sailor in Pub / Donald	2 episodes
1994	Rab C. Nesbitt	Young Policeman	Episode: "Mother"
1995	Soldier Soldier	Sgt Ian Kelly	Episode: "Leaving"
1995	Screen Two	David	Episode: "Nervous Energy"
1996	Grange Hill	Police Officer #2	Episode #19.16
1996	Atletico Partick	Dr. Maitland	3 episodes
1997	Taggart	Ian Jardine	Episode: "Apocalypse Part One"
1997	The Bill	D.C. Dave McGovern	Episode: "Professional Opinion"
1997	A Touch of Frost	Craig Hudson	Episode: "Penny for the Guy"
1997	This Life	Lenny	7 episodes
1998	Touching Evil	Emerson	Episodes: "Scalping Part 1 & 2"
1998	Undercover Heart	Jimmy Hatcher	5 episodes
1999	Great Expectations	Orlick	Television film
1999	Split Second	Ronnie Baxter	Television film
1999	The Magical Legend of the Leprechauns	Sean Devine	2 episodes
2000	Perfect World	Spencer	Episode: "Charity"
2001	The Mists of Avalon	Uther's Captain	2 episodes
2002	Menace	Det. Sgt. Skinner	2 episodes
2002–2003	Ultimate Force	Sergeant Pete Twamley	12 episodes
2005	Night Stalker	Damon Caylor	Episode: "The Five People You Meet in Hell"
2007	A.M.P.E.D.	Mark Jacocks	Television film
2008	Gemini Division	Walken	5 episodes
2008	Numb3rs	Victor Tooner	Episode: "Frienemies"
2009	Medium	Lucas Harvey	Episodes: "The Devil Inside Part 1 & 2"
2009	Primeval	Sir William de Mornay	Episode #3.7
2010	24	Lugo Elson	3 episodes
2010	The Mentalist	C.D.C.A Agent Dean Harken	Episode: "Code Red"
2010	Doctor Who	Vincent van Gogh	Episodes: "Vincent and the Doctor," "The Pandorica Opens"
2010	Pillars of the Earth	King Stephen	8 episodes
2011	CSI: Crime Scene Investigation	Dr. Tyrell Neth	Episode: "Unleashed"
2011	The Hunt for Tony Blair	Robin Cook	Television film
2011	Boardwalk Empire	Eaominn Rohan	Episode: "Peg of Old"
2011	Hawaii Five-0	John O'Toole	Episode: "Ike Maka"
2011	Covert Affairs	MI6 "Janitor" Kenneth Martin	Episode: "What's the Frequency, Kenneth?"
2011	Luck	Steward's Assistant	Episode: "Pilot"
2011	Young James Herriot	Prof. Donald Richie	3 episodes
2012	Labyrinth	Guy d'Évreux	2 episodes
2013–2015	Defiance	Datak Tarr; Datak Tarr's father	36 episodes
2014	Sons of Anarchy	Gaines	3 episodes
2014	Marvellous	Lou Macari	Television film
2016	Daredevil	Finn Cooley	Episode: "Penny and Dime"
2016	Elementary	Joshua Vikner	2 episodes
2016	Roots	Connelly	2 episodes
2016	Crazyhead	Callum	6 episodes
2017–2018	Voltron: Legendary Defender	Commander Throk / various (voice)	5 episodes
2018	The Looming Tower	Inspector Barry James	2 episodes
2018–2019	Ray Donovan	Michael "Red" Radulovic	7 episodes
2019	SEAL Team	Brett "Swanny" Swann	5 episodes
2019	Deadwood: The Movie	James Smith	Television film
2020–2023	Your Honor	Frankie	15 episodes
2021	The Flash	Despero	5 episodes
2021	Summer Camp Island	Ryan (voice)	Episode: "The Babies Chapter 2: Teacup Giant"
2022	For All Mankind	Clarke Halladay	Episode: "Happy Valley"
2022	The Calling	John Wentworth	6 episodes
2022	Mayflies	Tully	Two-part drama
2023	Secret Invasion	Derrik Weatherby	2 episodes
2024	Mary & George	King James I	7 episodes
2025	The Bombing of Pan Am 103	DCI Harry Bell	6 episodes
2025	Outlander: Blood of My Blood	Simon Fraser, Lord Lovat	10 episodes
TBA	Rhona Who Lives by the River	Narrator	Upcoming series

=== Video games ===
Year	Title	Role	Notes
2011	Call of Duty: Modern Warfare 3	Yuri, Major General MacMillan / "Baseplate"	
2012	Counter-Strike: Global Offensive	SAS soldier voices	
2025	Battlefield 6	Alexander Kincaid	
