= Stephanie Leonidas =

English actress

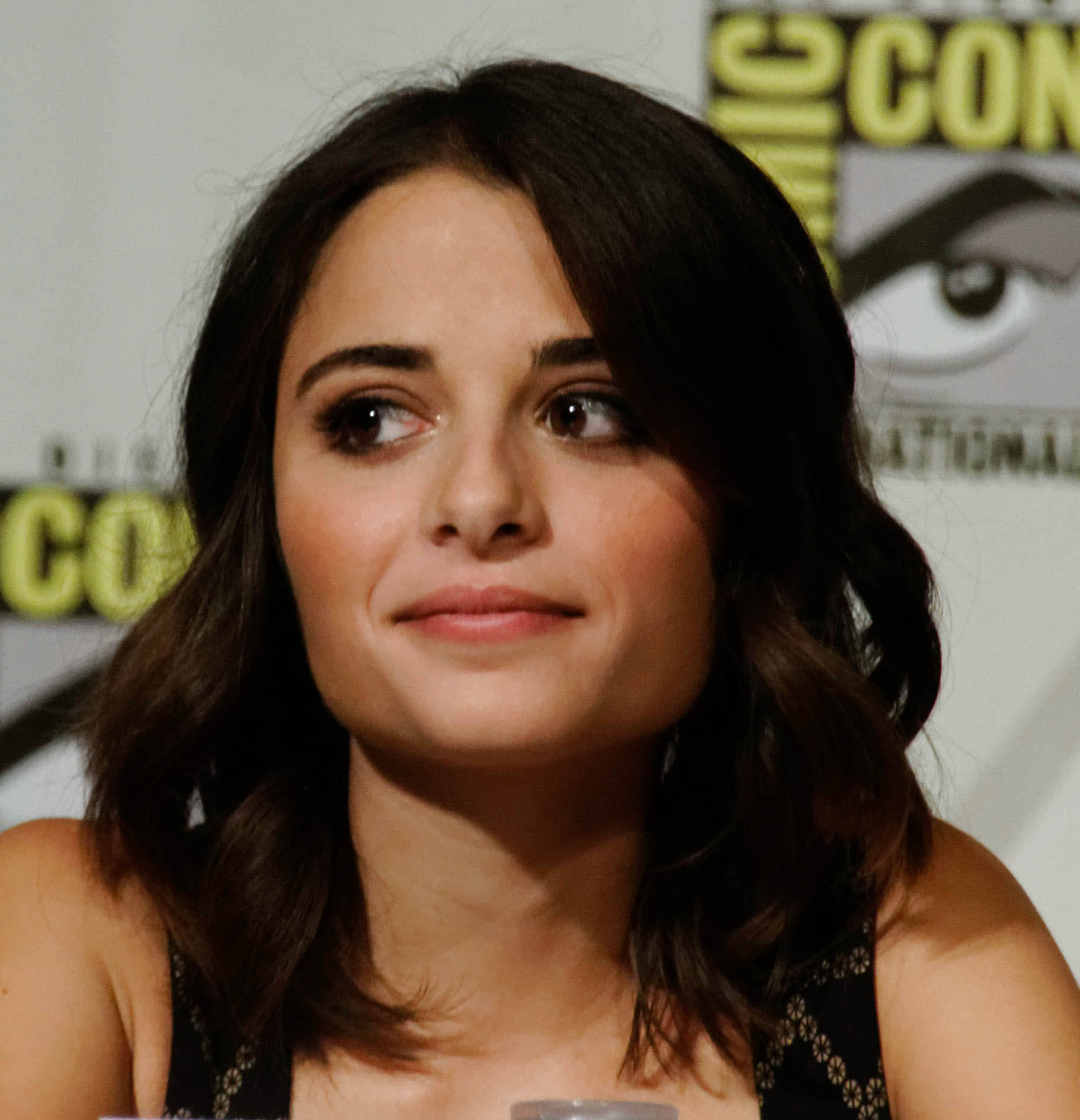
- Leonidas at the 2012 San Diego Comic-Con
- Born: 14 February 1984 (age 42); Westminster, London, England
- Occupation: Actress
- Years active: 1992–present
- Spouse: Robert Boulter (m. 2016)
- Children: 1
- Family: Dimitri Leonidas (brother); Georgina Leonidas (sister)

Stephanie Leonidas (born 14 February 1984) is an English actress. She is perhaps best known for her roles in the fantasy film MirrorMask (2005), the Syfy series Defiance (2013–2015), and the Crackle crime series Snatch (2017–2018).

== Early life ==
Leonidas was born in Westminster, London, the daughter of a Greek Cypriot father and an English mother. She also has Welsh ancestry through her mother. Her younger brother Dimitri and younger sister Georgina are also actors.

== Career ==
Leonidas started acting in community theatre when she was eight; at nine she acquired an agent and began to work in television.

Notable credits include the television drama Daddy's Girl, the soap opera Night and Day and a 2004 episode of Doc Martin (entitled 'Of All the Harbours in All the Towns') in which she plays Melanie, a local Portwenn 15-year-old girl who develops an unhealthy interest in the surgeon. In 2005 she starred in Neil Gaiman and Dave McKean's MirrorMask in the dual roles of Helena and the Dark Princess. She followed this with roles in a BBC adaptation of Dracula, as well as Crusade in Jeans. Her theatrical roles have included Adela in a production of Lorca's The House of Bernarda Alba at Coventry's Belgrade Theatre, and Dani in The Sugar Syndrome, staged at the Royal Court Theatre Upstairs, London, in 2003. In this latter production, reviewer Lizzie Loveridge said she gave a performance "way beyond her years".

Leonidas also starred in the BBC docudrama Atlantis, which aired on BBC One and BBC One HD on 8 May 2011. In 2011, she was also in a play for the Transatlantyk Festival called Influence, written by Shem Bitterman. Leonidas later teamed up with Dave McKean to work on the film Luna, released in 2014. She also starred as Irisa Nolan in the science fiction TV series Defiance, which ran for three seasons. In 2016, Leonidas played Sophie Hawthorne in the CBS mystery series American Gothic. She starred as Chloe Koen in the first season of the Crackle crime series Snatch and appeared in the 2018 film Tomorrow.

== Personal life ==
Leonidas married fellow actor Robert Boulter on New Year's Eve 2016. They have a child, born 2021.

== Filmography ==
=== Films ===
Year	Title	Role	Notes
2002	Fogbound	Annette at 16	Uncredited
2004	Yes	Grace	
2005	MirrorMask	Helena Campbell / The Dark Princess (Anti-Helena)	
2005	The Feast of the Goat	Uranita	
2006	Crusade in Jeans	Jenne	
2011	How to Stop Being a Loser	Patch	
2013	uwantme2killhim?	Kelly	
2014	Luna	Freya	
2018	Tomorrow	Katie	
2024	5lbs of Pressure	Donna	
2025	Marching Powder	Dani Jones	

=== Television ===
Year	Title	Role	Notes
1997	Chalk	Rabbit Girl 2	Episode: "Exam"
2000	Down to Earth	Chrissie	Episode: "O Best Beloved"
2001	Holby City	Sarah Newman	Episode: "Runaway"
2001	Night and Day	Della Wells	Main role
2002	Daddy's Girl	Emma Cooper	TV film
2003	Danielle Cable: Eyewitness	Kerri	TV film
2003	The Bill	Kirsty Sullivan	Episode: "125"
2004	Rose and Maloney	Katie Phelan	Episode #1.2
2004	Doc Martin	Melanie Gibson	Episode: "Of All the Harbours in All the Towns"
2004	Wall of Silence	Tracy Broughton	TV film
2005	Revelations	Athena	Episode: "Hour Two"
2005	Empire	Girlfriend Olivia	TV miniseries
2005	Beneath the Skin	Zoe Haratounian	TV film
2006	Brief Encounters	Jay	Episode: "One Night in White Satin"
2006	Dracula	Mina Murray	TV film
2007	Agatha Christie's Marple	Hester Argyle	Episode: "Ordeal by Innocence"
2011	Atlantis: End of a World, Birth of a Legend	Pinaruti	TV film
2012	Eternal Law	Jude	Episodes: "Episode Three", "Episode Four"
2012	Whitechapel	Georgie Fox	Episodes: "Case One (Part 1)", "Case One (Part 2)"
2013–2015	Defiance	Irisa Nyira	Main role
2013	The Bible	Rahab	Episode: "Homeland"
2013	Agatha Christie's Poirot	Hattie Stubs	Episode: "Dead Man's Folly"
2013	By Any Means	Coleen Parker	Episode #1.2
2015	Midsomer Murders	Annabel Latimer	Episode (#17.2): "Murder by Magic"
2015	Killing Jesus	Salome	TV film
2016	American Gothic	Sophie Hawthorne	Main role
2016	Killjoys	Clara	Guest role
2017	Snatch	Chloe Koen	Main role
2020	Van der Valk	Eva Meisner	Episode: "Love in Amsterdam"
2020	Endeavour	Violetta Talenti	Series 7, Episodes 1 - 3
2021	Feel Good	Binky	Season 2, Episode 3
2023	A Very Venice Romance	Amy	TV film

=== Video game ===
- Defiance (2013), as Irisa Nyira (voice role)

=== Audiobook ===
- MirrorMask (2005), Narrator, as Helena Campbell

== Theatre ==
- The Sugar Syndrome as Dani (2003)
- The House of Bernarda Alba as Adela (2010)
- Influence as Sally (2012)
