= Defiance (TV series) =

2013 American science fiction TV series

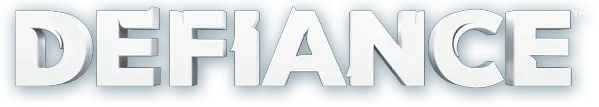
- Genre: Science fiction
- Developed by: Rockne S. O'Bannon; Kevin Murphy; Michael Taylor
- Starring: Grant Bowler; Julie Benz; Stephanie Leonidas; Tony Curran; Jaime Murray; Graham Greene; Mia Kirshner; Jesse Rath; James Murray; Anna Hopkins; Nichole Galicia
- Composer: Bear McCreary
- Country of origin: United States
- Original language: English
- No. of seasons: 3
- No. of episodes: 39 (list of episodes)

Production
- Executive producers: Scott Stewart; Rockne S. O'Bannon; Kevin Murphy; Michael Taylor
- Producers: Paul M. Leonard; Michael Nankin; Anupam Nigam
- Production locations: Toronto, Ontario, Canada
- Running time: 40–45 min 85 min ("Pilot")
- Production companies: Five & Dime Productions; Universal Cable Productions; Open 4 Business Productions

Original release
- Network: Syfy
- Release: April 15, 2013 – August 28, 2015

Defiance is an American science fiction Western drama television series developed by Rockne S. O'Bannon, Kevin Murphy, and Michael Taylor; the series is produced by Universal Cable Productions.

The show takes place in a post-apocalyptic future on a radically transformed Earth containing new species, some having arrived from space, many others the result of haphazard contamination by the terraforming technology used by the alien race the Votans, which has transformed native flora and fauna in unforeseen ways. The story begins in the year 2046 when Earth has been considerably changed, with new topography, the extinction of plant and animal species and the emergence of new species. The series follows Joshua Nolan (Grant Bowler), his adopted alien daughter Irisa (Stephanie Leonidas), and the town's new mayor, Amanda Rosewater (Julie Benz), in addition to an ensemble of actors portraying different characters in the growing town in the city-state of Defiance, built on the ruins of St. Louis.

The series was broadcast in the United States on the cable channel Syfy and in various international markets. It premiered on April 15, 2013, in the United States and that same week in most countries that picked up the series. Defiance was renewed for a 13-episode third season on September 25, 2014, which premiered on June 12, 2015.

On October 16, 2015, the show was cancelled by Syfy, citing financial reasons after having completed its third season. However, the companion video game, Defiance, continued to be supported until April 2021 when all servers and community services were shut down. On March 1, 2016, Trion Worlds announced a major update for the game, promoted as season four of the show. They also stated they had no plans of making a sequel, instead they will continue to update the game with new content. The new version, titled Defiance 2050, was released on July 10, 2018, for PC, Xbox One, and PlayStation 4, and recreates the original game (set in 2046) into the year 2050, 20 years after the Human-Votan war-ending Arkfall event.

== Plot ==
In 2013, seven species of extraterrestrial refugees (the Votans) arrived in orbit around Earth. They had expected to find the planet uninhabited and suitable for terraforming and colonization, and were as surprised by humanity's presence as humanity was by their arrival. Confusion over what to do about the alien refugees led to a series of events including the "Arkfall", wherein most of the Votans' spaceships were destroyed in orbit, and a series of conflicts called the Pale Wars. These events resulted in the destruction of most nation-states and the accidental and uncontrolled deployment of Votan terraforming technology, which radically altered Earth's landscape and mutated its ecosystems. A seventh alien race, the Volge, also arrived at Earth during the Pale Wars, to the surprise of both humans and Votans. These wars ended in the Battle of Defiance, which took place at Fort Defiance in St. Louis, formerly the Palace of Fine Arts.

Decades later, one of the veterans of that battle, Joshua Nolan, and his adopted Votan daughter, Irisa, arrive in the town of Defiance, named after the battle and built on top of the ruins of St. Louis. Defiance is a melting pot of human and alien cultures and insists on remaining neutral between the Western hemisphere's two major nation-states: the human-dominated Earth Republic, centered in New York City, and the alien-dominated Votanis Collective, headquartered in Brazil. Intending only to salvage a "terrasphere" from some Arkfall wreckage, Nolan and Irisa discover a plot by the town's former mayor to hire Volge mercenaries to destroy the town. After saving the town, they decide to stay awhile, with Nolan being appointed "lawkeeper" (a sheriff, more or less). This position allows Nolan to investigate various crimes and conspiracies related to the ex-mayor's attempt to destroy the town, and how those plots are all related to Irisa, the apocalyptic cult from which she was rescued as a child, and a Votan spaceship buried under the town. He must also contend with drama unrelated to Irisa and the ex-mayor, such as the blood feud between the town's two richest families—the human McCawley family, which owns and operates the Gulanite mines on which the town's economy depends, and the alien Tarr family, which runs organized crime.

== Cast ==
=== Main ===
- Grant Bowler as Joshua Nolan
- Julie Benz as Amanda Rosewater
- Stephanie Leonidas as Irisa Nyira
- Tony Curran as Datak Tarr
- Jaime Murray as Stahma Tarr
- Graham Greene as Rafe McCawley
- Mia Kirshner as Kenya Rosewater (season 1; guest season 2)
- Jesse Rath as Alak Tarr (seasons 2–3; recurring season 1)
- James Murray as Niles Pottinger (season 2; special guest season 3)
- Anna Hopkins as Jessica "Berlin" Rainier (season 3; recurring season 2)
- Nichole Galicia as Kindzi (season 3)

=== Recurring ===
- Trenna Keating as Doc Yewll
- Dewshane Williams as Tommy LaSalle
- Justin Rain as Quentin McCawley
- Nicole Muñoz as Christie McCawley Tarr
- Fionnula Flanagan as Nicolette "Nicky" Riordon (season 1)
- Brittany Allen as Tirra (season 1)
- Gale Harold as Connor Lang (seasons 1–2)
- Noah Danby as Sukar (season 2; co-star season 1)
- William Atherton as Viceroy Mercado (season 2)
- Amy Forsyth as Andina (seasons 2–3)
- Linda Hamilton as Pilar McCawley (seasons 2–3)
- Ryan Kennedy as Josef (season 2)
- Kristina Pesic as Deirdre Lamb (season 2)
- Douglas Nyback as Sgt. Frei Poole (seasons 2–3)
- Robin Dunne as Cai (season 2) / Reimlu (guest season 2) / Miko (guest season 1)
- America Olivo as Alethea (season 2)
- Lee Tergesen as General Rahm Tak (season 3)
- Conrad Coates as T’evgin (season 3)
- Billy MacLellan as Lieutenant Bebe (season 3)
- Tony Nappo as Indur (season 3)
- Rainbow Sun Francks as Uno (season 3)
- Demore Barnes as Dos (season 3)

== Episodes ==
Season	Episodes	Originally released	
Season	Episodes	First released	Last released
1	13	April 15, 2013	July 8, 2013
2	13	June 19, 2014	August 28, 2014
3	13	June 12, 2015	August 28, 2015

== Production ==
=== Development ===
In June 2011, Syfy announced that they would be producing a television series which was being developed by Rockne S. O'Bannon and would be produced by Universal Cable Productions. It was also announced that the TV series would be connected to a video game being produced by Trion Worlds. It was later confirmed that Syfy had ordered thirteen episodes for the show's first season, which would premiere in either late 2012 or the summer of 2013. In July 2012, the network announced that the series and game would debut in April 2013.

Casting announcements began in January 2012, with Grant Bowler being the first to be cast. Bowler plays Joshua Nolan, "the law keeper in a bustling frontier boomtown that is one of the new world's few oases of civility and inclusion." On February 8, TVWise revealed profiles for five of the main characters. It was later reported that Gillian Anderson had been briefly considered by the show's producers to play either Amanda or Stahma. However, that casting did not move forward as they assumed she would not be interested in returning to episodic television. On March 8, 2012, it was announced that Julie Benz, Stephanie Leonidas, Tony Curran and Jaime Murray had been cast in the series. Julie Benz plays Amanda Rosewater, the mayor of Defiance; Stephanie Leonidas plays Irisa, "a beautiful warrior who is part of an alien race called the Irathients"; Tony Curran plays Datak Tarr, "the right hand to Amanda"; and Jaime Murray plays Stahma Tarr, "Datak’s beautiful and proper wife".

Production of the first season began in April 2012 in Toronto.

For season 1, language creator David J. Peterson developed two full languages for the Castithans and the Irathients. Basic language sketches were prepared for two of the other races, the Indogenes and the Liberata, the latter of which was never used. By the end of the series, Peterson had developed four full languages (Castithan, Irathient, Indojisnen, and Kinuk'aaz), and their respective scripts.

On May 10, 2013, Syfy renewed Defiance for a 13-episode second season to air starting in June 2014, with production from August to December 2013.

=== Alien races ===
Votan races:

- Castithans: The Castithans are an aristocratic and ethereal race from the planet Daribo. Known for their pale skin and beautiful features, they have a cunning intelligence and unbridled ambition that helped them adapt to life on Earth. Very conservative in many aspects of life, including politics and a rigid caste system, Castithans are liberal with sexuality. They are disliked by the other members of the collective for their perceived arrogant and imperialist manner. The role of bathing as a family in their culture is another quirk that sets them apart from the other races. In season 2, it was confirmed that they can reproduce with humans.
- Irathients: Irathients are the most common Votan race living on Earth, hailing from the planet Irath. Other races, including Humans, often view them as feral due to their tribal nature and love of the natural world. Irathients have deep red hair, highly athletic builds and bronze skin covered in naturally occurring contrasting patterns. While they're quite able to succeed at any occupation, most Irathients prefer to be farmers in order to honor their forefathers. Irathients are able to produce viable offspring with humans.
- Indogenes: Indogenes are a manufactured species. They tend to be slender, bald, with hexagonal-patterned skin, which is called "protoform" and it can heal injuries in Omecs, of a solid color (most often pure white) who augment their bodies with a variety of cybernetic implants specifically designed for their chosen profession. They revere science and knowledge above all, and invented most of the technology used by the other alien races.
- Sensoth: The Sensoth physically resemble apes and giant sloths, being fur covered, and originated in a specific region of Irath. They have many of the Earth's sloth-like characteristics, speaking and acting quite slowly. They have great physical strength and imposing presence, so they can be intimidating to many, despite almost always having kind personalities. This strength of body leads to many of them being hard laborers, more often than not in the employ of a Castithan.
- Liberata: The Liberata are physically short and stocky with thick hair around their head and face. They often fill the role of servants for the other races, performing menial tasks and labor. The other Votan races look down on them due to their history of greed and avarice. They breathe nitrogen instead of oxygen.
- Gulanee: The Gulanee are the biggest mystery of the Votan races. Many believe they are beings of pure energy, appearing as large balls of light; however this is just an image projected by their "encapsulation suits", required to sustain Gulanee life. There are very few Gulanee on Terraformed Earth as most Gulanee stayed on their home Gula, confident they'd survive the destruction of the Votanis system. Most other races know very little about the Gulanee, as they have only recently established relationships with the other races.
- Volge: The Volge are feared by humans and Votans alike for their warmongering attitude. Originating from a different system from the Votans, the Volge conquered the Votan planet Omec. Volge stand over eight feet tall and always wear armor, which sustains them on Earth because they cannot breathe oxygen. During the Votan exodus, the other races chose to leave the Volge behind – their appearance during the Pale Wars was a surprise to all. They are seldom seen since the Armistice, having retreated to caves.
- Omec: The Omec developed on the planet Omec, possessing technology long before the other Votan races. Every 76 years their planet would come into range of the other Votan worlds and the Omec would raid them, collecting the other Votans to be used as slaves, sexual playthings and eventually food. They are a vampire-like race that preys on other sentient beings. Physically they have purple skin and white hair, and much greater physical strength and resistance to injury. At some point they were conquered by the Volge but a few of them survived and made the journey to Earth. They are considered devils and enchanters by the other Votan races and are widely feared for their predatory natures.

Other non-human races include:

- Hellbugs: The Hellbugs are a once harmless crustacean race that were mutated with Butterfly DNA during the Terraforming. They are vicious predators who live in large collectives. They have a very similar hierarchy to ants or bees, headed by a Matron who commands Warriors, Archers, Skitterlings, and Monarchs. While very dangerous and always posing a threat to sentient life, they are not eradicated as they produce a valuable energy source: Petrohol.
- Biomen: Biomen are not aliens, but were commissioned as a super-soldier product by Earth's human militaries during the Pale Wars. Biomen are tall and very well muscled, coming in a range of colors and skin tones, but always with a batch number branded across their chest. All Biomen have an off switch somewhere in their bodies. Now effectively useless since the Armistice, they still suffer from the rage built into their personae and need to be given a focused outlet. They have trouble integrating into peacetime, and are stigmatized by humans and Votans alike.

=== Music ===
The musical score for both the series and the game was assigned to Bear McCreary. McCreary said that he had to be sure that each version (for the series and the game) had its own unique characteristics, suited to its needs, but also that musical threads united the franchise. He also stated that scoring a project like Defiance was a rare situation for a composer. "Heavy synths and ethnic soloists played a key role in defining the sound of Defiance, but the cinematic quality came from working with a string orchestra.[...] I was asked to help bring the alien cultures to life by developing a distinct musical heritage for each. I fashioned Votan instrumentation and lyrics into a variety of popular songs and ceremonial pieces. I wrote pieces for street musicians that float through open-air marketplaces. I produced alien classical music, jingles, jazz, rock-anthems and torch songs."

== Broadcast ==
Defiance was aired in multiple countries around the world without much delay, atypical of global syndication norms.

- The series premiered on April 15, 2013, in the U.S. on Syfy and Canada on Showcase.
- The show also premiered in the United Kingdom and Ireland on Syfy, in France on Syfy and in Germany on Syfy Universal on April 16, 2013.
- In Australia, the pay tv premiere was on April 18, 2013, on SF (now Syfy Australia), while the free-to-air premiere was almost a year later on February 12, 2014, on the Seven Network.

== Reception ==
Defiance received an approval rating from Rotten Tomatoes of 61% based on 18 reviews for the first season, 100% based on 8 reviews for season 2, and 75% based on 8 reviews for season 3. The first season of Defiance was rated "mixed or average" by Metacritic, with a 57% rating according to 17 reviews.

Maureen Ryan of The Huffington Post called it "a smart, well-crafted TV show with a good cast and an adventurous flavor" and added "it's also indisputably science fiction, which is a relief," saying that she felt too many science fiction shows were "watered-down ... genre-lite dramas". She also praised the casting, performances and the production design. Ellen Gray of the Philadelphia Daily News noted that "the TV show may not break new ground ... but it does stand on its own as a watchable sci-fi series, with a Wild West vibe mixed with a bit of "Farscape-meets-West Side Story."

David Hinckley of the New York Daily News gave it one star out of five and found it to be "incomprehensible", but said "if you’re a sci-fi fan for whom this stuff can never be too complex, have at it." Other reviewers gave Defiance average reviews and noted its similarity to previous television series, while at the same time praising its "breathtaking" landscapes and "impressively rendered" monsters; its "intriguing" cast and setting; its digital effects and performances; and its mythology and "interesting" story.
