= Marios Gavrilis =

German actor (born 1985)

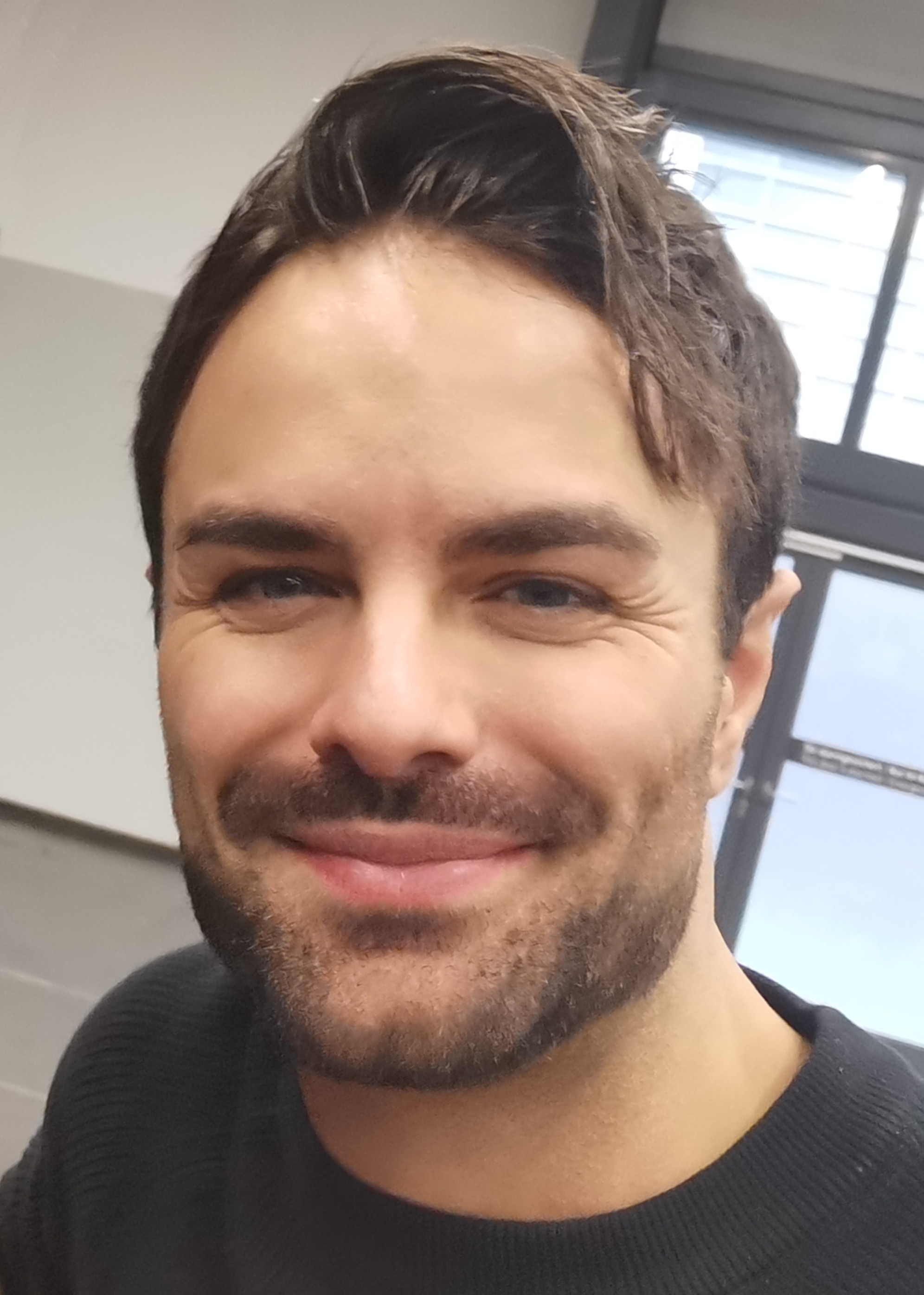
- Marios Gavrilis at the German Comic Con (2022)
- Born: 19 December 1985 (age 40); Braunschweig, Germany
- Occupation: Actor
- Years active: 2009–present

Marios Gavrilis (Braunschweig, 19 December 1985) is a German actor who became internationally known for his portrayal of the antagonist Emmerich Voss in the 2024 action-adventure game Indiana Jones and the Great Circle.

== Career ==
Gavilis was a member of the ensemble at the Deutsches Schauspielhaus in Hamburg from 2010 to 2011. Further productions took him to the Schauspiel Frankfurt, the Staatstheater Mainz and the Theaterhaus Jena.

After his studies, Gavrilis has worked as a voice actor with over 200 dubbing roles according to Deutsche Synchronkartei. These are mainly German dubbing works. He also works for advertising productions, radio dramas, audiobooks and video games.

== Personal life ==
Gavrilis lives in Berlin and Los Angeles and has Greek and German citizenship.

== Work ==
On-screen appearances:

=== Movies ===
- 2010: Morgen musst Du sterben
- 2016: Familie Braun
- 2017: Alarm für Cobra 11 – Die Autobahnpolizei (TV series, 1 episode)
- 2020: Among Us (short film)
- 2024: Bad Director

=== Television ===
- since 2019: The Masked Singer (German Edition) as Voice-over
- 2024: A Better Place (TV series)

==== Dubbing Work ====
The following roles are voice work where Gavrilis voice was used for dubbing the characters or actors into German.

===== Movies =====
- 2010: Lights Out (Simon Werner a disparu) as Luc
- 2012: Offender as Tommy Nix
- 2013: The Canyons as Ryan
- 2013: Dark Feed as Darrell
- 2013: Chasing Shakespeare (From Above) as Luca
- 2014: The Maze Runner as Zart
- 2014: Pride as Ray
- 2014: A Borrowed Identity as Jonathan
- 2014: Search Party as Jason
- 2015: Badge of Honor as Mike Gallo
- 2015: The Boy Next Door as Noah Sandborn
- 2015: Jane Got a Gun
- 2015: Stonewall as Joe Altman
- 2016: Bad Moms as Jessie Harkness
- 2016: Ben Hur as Judah Ben Hur
- 2016: Office Christmas Party as Tim
- 2016: Jarhead 3: The Siege as Stamper
- 2016: Moonlight as Black
- 2016: Lion (Lion) as Mantosh Brierley
- 2016: Race as Eulace Peacock
- 2017: Bad Moms 2 as Jessie Harkness
- 2017: Detroit as Lee
- 2017: Woman Walks Ahead as Chaska
- 2017: Basmati Blues as William
- 2017: Die Angst in meinem Haus (Be Afraid) as Officer Cass
- 2017: Killing Hasselhoff as Sebastian
- 2017: On Body and Soul (Teströl és lélekröl) as Sandor
- 2017: Sand Castle as Sgt. Harper
- 2017: Back to Burgundy (Ce qui nous lie) as Jean
- 2017: Alibi.com as Geliebter
- 2018: Destroyer as Taz
- 2018: How It Ends as Will Younger
- 2018: 12 Strong as Ben Milo
- 2018: Titan as Andrew Rutherford
- 2018: Day of the Dead: Bloodline as Baca Salazar
- 2023: The Super Mario Bros. Movie as Donkey Kong
- 2024: The Lord of the Rings: The War of the Rohirrim as Haleth Hammerhand

===== TV Series =====
- 2010: Durarara!! as Kyouhei Kadota
- since 2011: Puppy in My Pocket: Adventures in Pocketville as Magic
- 2011: Steins;Gate as Okabe Rintarou
- 2013–2015: Cedar Cove as John Bowman
- 2013–2018: House of Cards as Sean Jeffries
- 2013–2014: Played as Jesse Calvert
- 2013, 2017: Top of the Lake as Mark Mitcham
- 2013–2018: The Tunnel (The Tunnel) as Danny Hillier
- 2014–2015: Yona of the Dawn (Akatsuki no Yona) as Jeaha
- 2014: The Irregular at Magic High School (Mahouka Koukou no Rettousei) as Shun Morisaki
- 2014–2016: Tyrant as Ihab Rashid
- 2014–2022: Peaky Blinders as Michael Gray
- 2015–2020 Blindspot as Rich Dotcom
- 2015: Between as Gord
- 2015: Charlotte (Anime) as Kumagami
- 2015–2021: Supergirl as James Olsen
- 2016–2023: Attack on Titan as Reiner Braun
- 2016–2018: Mars as Robert Foucault
- 2016–2017: American Horror Story as Matt Miller
- 2016–2018: Luke Cage as Sugar
- 2016–2019: Preacher as Jesse Custer
- 2016–2018: Shades of Blue as Marcus Tufo
- 2016: Roots as Silla Ba Dibba
- 2017: 1993 – (Jede Revolution hat ihren Preis) as Pietro Bosco
- 2017: The Mist as Bryan Hunt
- 2017: Ninjago as Acronix
- since 2009: Fairy Tail as Gajeel Redfox
- 2017–2021: Money Heist (La casa de papel) as Denver
- since 2017: Transferts (Im fremden Körper) as Gabriel
- since 2017: Riverdale as Hiram Lodge
- 2018: Collateral as DS Nathan Bilk
- 2018: Star Wars Resistance as Marcus Speedstar
- 2019: Demon Slayer as Kyogai
- since 2020: Blood of Zeus as Seraphim
- 2021: One Piece as Katakuri
- 2021: The Falcon and the Winter Soldier as Lemar Hoskins
- since 2021: JoJo's Bizarre Adventure: Phantom Blood / Stardust Crusaders / Stone Ocean as Dio Brando
- 2022: That Time I Got Reincarnated as a Slime the Movie: Scarlet Bond as Hiiro
- 2022: The Tourist (Duell im Outback) as Kosta Panigiris
- 2023: The Continental as Frankie Scott

===== Video games =====
- 2014: Risen 3: Titan Lords as Horas
- 2016: Final Fantasy XV as Ravus Nox Fleuret
- 2017: Middle-earth: Shadow of War (Mittelerde: Schatten des Krieges) as Serka
- 2017: The Evil Within 2 as Theodore Wallace
- 2018: Far Cry 5 as Dr. Charles Lindsey
- 2018: Assassin's Creed Odyssey as Alexios
- 2019: Death Stranding as Sam Porter Bridges
- 2019: Mortal Kombat 11 as Rain
- 2021: Far Cry 6 as Dani Rojas
- 2022: Gotham Knights as Bruce Wayne / Batman
- 2023: Dead Space as Sgt. Zach Hammond
- 2023: Mortal Kombat 1 as Rain
- 2023: Spider-Man 2 as Venom
- 2024: Indiana Jones and the Great Circle as Emmerich Voss

=== Radio drama (selection) ===
- 2009: Wolfgang Koeppen: Trilogie des Scheiterns: Tauben im Gras – Bearbeitung und Regie: Leonhard Koppelmann
- 2009: Arthur Schnitzler: Reigen – Regie: Marlene Breuer
- 2010: Leon de Winter: Leo Kaplan (1. Teil) – Regie: Leonhard Koppelmann
- 2011: Per Petterson: Ich verfluche den Fluss der Zeit – Bearbeitung und Regie: Götz Fritsch
- 2016: Martin Heindel: Small Wonders. An oral history of World War III – Regie: Martin Heindel
- 2018: Timo Kinzel, Benjamin Oechsle: 06: Krieg in Boston – Kapitel III
- 2019: Marc Freund: Insel-Krimi

== Awards and nominations ==
In 2019, he was awarded the Award of Excellence 2019 at the One-Reeler Short Film Competition in Los Angeles for the film Shots Fired.

=== Voice Arts Awards (SOVAS) ===
- 2022: Winner - Outstanding Body of Work – International – Best Voiceover
- 2022: Winner - Outstanding Body of Work – International – Best Voiceover for
- 2019: Winner - Outstanding Body of Work – International – Best Voiceover

=== NAVGTR Awards 2024 ===
- 2025: Nominee - Performance in a Drama, Supporting
