= Adriana Mather =

American novelist

- Born: Long Island, New York
- Education: Vassar College
- Occupations: Actress; novelist; film producer
- Website: zombotpictures.com

Adriana Mather is an American actress, novelist, and film producer. She is known for starring in the romantic drama Honeyglue (2015), and for writing the New York Times best-selling novel How To Hang A Witch, published by Penguin Random House in 2016.

== Personal life ==
Adriana Mather grew up in Long Island, New York. She is the 12th generation of Mathers in America. Her grandmother has an impressive collection of items related to Mather family history, including journals and letters dating back to the Revolutionary war, the Titanic, and the Salem witch trials, which Adriana uses as inspiration for her writing.

She played rugby at Vassar College and went to Nationals twice.

== Career ==
Mather's debut screen role was in a film called Chasing Shakespeare (2013), co-starring Danny Glover and Graham Greene. Her first ever scene on set was with Danny Glover, which she described as terrifying because she was afraid to mess it up.

In 2012, Mather founded a film production company Zombot Pictures with two friends writer/director James Bird and producer/composer Anya Remizova. As part of Zombot Pictures she produced and starred in two feature films - an oddball comedy Eat Spirit Eat (Vera) and a romantic drama Honeyglue (Morgan), in which she plays a young woman who learns she has three months left to live and embarks on an adventure with a gender fluid artist. Adriana describes the role as challenging because she had to do a lot of research to figure out how to accurately portray the progression of illness. She was also required to fully shave her head.

Mather's portrayal of Morgan received praise from critics. Katie Walsh of LA Times calls it "an embodied performance" and Jason Coleman of Starpulse describes it as "one of the most realistic and arresting character cancer transformations ever".

After completing Honeyglue, Mather started working on her debut novel How to Hang a Witch—part ghost story, part historical fiction, set in Salem, Massachusetts, where the infamous Salem witch trials took place.

In November 2014, it was announced that Mather sold the rights to her first novel, How to Hang a Witch, to Knopf Books for Young Readers/Random House in a two-book deal. How to Hang a Witch was published on July 26, 2016; it reached number one on The New York Times best-seller list. The novel received generally positive reviews from critics. Seventeen described it as "Mean Girls meets history class in the best possible way.”

The follow-up to How to Hang a Witch, titled Haunting the Deep, was published on October 3, 2017.

Mather's next film project is titled We Are Boats.

== Filmography ==
- Chasing Shakespeare (2013) as Betty in Riverdale as well
- Eat Spirit Eat (2014) as Vera / also producer
- Honeyglue (2015) as Morgan / also producer
- We are Boats (2019) as Ryan

== Bibliography ==
- How to Hang A Witch (book 1) - July 26, 2016
- Haunting the Deep (book 2) - October 3, 2017
- Killing November (book 1) - March 26, 2019
- Hunting November (book 2) - May 5, 2020
