= We Are Boats =

2018 American fantasy film

- Film poster
- Directed by: James Birdi
- Written by: James Birdes
- Produced by: James Birde; Adriana Mather; Anya Remizova
- Starring: Angela Sarafyan; Adriana Mather; Justin Cornwell; Luke Hemsworth; Jack Falahee; Gaia Weiss; Booboo Stewart; Graham Greene; Amanda Plummer; Uzo Aduba
- Cinematography: Stefan Colson
- Music by: Anya Remizova
- Production company: Zombot Pictures
- Distributed by: Breaking Glass Pictures
- Release date: May 13, 2018 (AFI World Peace Initiative Film Festival)
- Running time: 108 minutes
- Country: United States
- Language: English

We Are Boats is a 2018 American fantasy film written and directed by James Birdi and stars Angela Sarafyan as a dead prostitute who is sent back to Earth to help various people.

== Plot ==
The film centers around Francesca, a young woman who dies tragically when she's pushed off a bridge by her boyfriend after telling him she's pregnant. After her death, Francesca becomes what the film calls an "Arc" - a spiritual guide who helps people fulfill their destinies before they die.

As an Arc, Francesca's mission is to guide various people whose lives are about to end, helping them find closure or complete important tasks before their time comes. The film follows her as she encounters several different characters:

1. She meets a young painter who is terminally ill. Francesca helps him reconnect with his estranged father before he passes away.

2. She encounters a businessman who has become disconnected from what truly matters in life. Through her guidance, he reconciles with his family just before a fatal accident.

3. She helps a young couple find each other and fall in love, knowing that their time together will be brief but meaningful.

4. She assists a musician who has lost his creative spark, helping him create one final beautiful piece before his death.

Throughout these encounters, Francesca maintains a connection to her own unfinished business - her unborn child and the boyfriend who killed her. The film explores themes of redemption, destiny, and the interconnectedness of human lives.

As Francesca completes her duties as an Arc, she begins to understand that she too has a destiny to fulfill beyond helping others. The film concludes with Francesca finding her own peace and completing her spiritual journey, suggesting that even those who guide others need their own form of closure.

The title "We Are Boats" serves as a metaphor for how people navigate the waters of life, sometimes drifting, sometimes with purpose, but all eventually reaching their destination.

== Cast ==
- Angela Sarafyan as Francesca
- Luke Hemsworth as Lucas
- Amanda Plummer as Jimmie
- Adriana Mather as Ryan
- Justin Cornwell as Freddie
- Jack Falahee as Michael Lamina
- Gaia Weiss as Rachel
- Booboo Stewart as Taylor
- Graham Greene as Cliff
- Uzo Aduba as Sir

== Reception ==
As of October 2021, the film has a 50% approval rating on Rotten Tomatoes, based on six reviews with an average rating of 6.4/10.
