= Havoc (2025 film) =

Film by Gareth Evans

- Release poster
- Directed by: Gareth Evans
- Written by: Gareth Evans
- Produced by: Ed Talfan; Gareth Evans; Aram Tertzakian; Tom Hardy
- Starring: Tom Hardy; Jessie Mei Li; Justin Cornwell; Quelin Sepulveda; Luis Guzmán; Yeo Yann Yann; Timothy Olyphant; Forest Whitaker
- Cinematography: Matt Flannery
- Edited by: Sara Jones; Matt Platts-Mills
- Music by: Aria Prayogi
- Production companies: Severn Screen; One More One; XYZ Films
- Distributed by: Netflix
- Release date: April 25, 2025
- Running time: 107 minutes
- Countries: United States; United Kingdom
- Languages: English; Cantonese

Havoc is a 2025 action thriller film written and directed by Gareth Evans. The film stars Tom Hardy, Jessie Mei Li, Justin Cornwell, Quelin Sepulveda, Luis Guzmán, Yeo Yann Yann, Timothy Olyphant, and Forest Whitaker. It is a co-production between the United States and the United Kingdom. The film was released by Netflix on April 25, 2025.

== Plot ==
Patrick Walker is a homicide detective, estranged from his family and on the payroll of Lawrence Beaumont, a real estate tycoon, mayoral candidate, and father of Charlie. Charlie is part of a gang of thieves, alongside his girlfriend Mia, Johnny, and Wes, all of whom steal a batch of washing machines that contains a hidden shipment of cocaine. They are pursued by Vincent, Hayes, Jake and Cortez, a group of narcotics squad detectives. Cortez is badly wounded and hospitalized.

That night, Charlie and Mia take the stolen cocaine to Tsui, the head of the local Triad. Mia had stolen Tsui's car and was forced to work for him to pay off the debt. While there, a gang of masked assailants bursts into the hideout, gunning down Tsui and his enforcers. Charlie and Mia barely escape. The masked gang is in league with Ching, Tsui's uncle and disgruntled lieutenant.

Upon learning that his son is accused of Tsui's murder, Lawrence commands Walker to find him. Working with his rookie partner, Ellie, Walker begins hunting down leads for Charlie and Mia's location. He visits Cortez at the hospital, as he and the entire narcotics squad used to be on Lawrence's payroll. Walker is estranged from Vincent, Hayes, Jake, and Cortez now, following an incident where Vincent killed an undercover cop during a drug theft gone wrong.

Tsui's mother and Ching's older sister, a Triad leader nicknamed "Mother", arrives in the city. Ching blames Charlie for her son's death, so Mother has Lawrence kidnapped to find Charlie. Walker tracks down Mia's uncle, Raul, who is forging passports that Charlie and Mia can use to leave the country. He takes Raul's phone and intercepts Mia at a nightclub. However, he is interrupted by Vincent, Hayes, and Jake, and then Triads, all attacking, resulting in a mass shootout. Mia identifies Vincent as Tsui's killer. Hayes, Raul, Johnny, Wes are killed in the brawl. Walker escapes with Mia and Charlie.

Walker realizes that Vincent and his colleagues were seeking to hijack the cocaine shipment for themselves, rather than capture Charlie's gang. Vincent is in league with Ching, who had a buyer for the cocaine. Ching sought to profit from the deal and take out Tsui, whom he resented for being promoted to head the Triads over him. Tying up loose ends, Ching murders Cortez and his wife at the hospital. Ellie, sent by Walker, captures him.

Walker takes Charlie and Mia to his father's old cabin on the city's outskirts. The Triads track them down and begin a massive assault, and Charlie and Mia are captured. Walker kills the Assassin, Mother's righthand, but is badly wounded. Mother arrives with Lawrence. Still believing Charlie killed Tsui, she tells Lawrence to shoot Mia since Charlie loves her.

Ellie arrives, having captured Vincent and Jake alongside Ching. She reveals them as the guilty parties. Ching admits that he plotted Tsui's death because he was jealous of his sister passing the leadership to her inexperienced son instead of to him after their eldest brother, the previous Triad leader, died. Jake tries to shoot Charlie, but Lawrence shields him, dying in Charlie's arms. Ching and traitorous Triad members loyal to him shoot Mother dead. Ching also wounds Vincent, who in turn guns Ching down and flees with the cocaine. Walker pursues him.

Charlie guns down Jake in revenge for his father. Vincent is shot by Walker. They talk but he shoots Walker, prompting him to shoot Vincent dead. Ellie lets Charlie and Mia go. Walker, wounded, urges Ellie to arrest him. She refuses, and Walker looks upon the arriving police cars, his fate uncertain.

== Cast ==
- Tom Hardy as Patrick Walker
- Jessie Mei Li as Ellie Cheung
- Justin Cornwell as Charlie Beaumont
- Quelin Sepulveda as Mia
- Luis Guzmán as Raul
- Michelle Waterson as the Assassin
- Sunny Pang as Ching
- Jim Caesar as Wes
- Xelia Mendes-Jones as Johnny
- Yeo Yann Yann as Tsui's mother
- Timothy Olyphant as Vincent
- Forest Whitaker as Lawrence Beaumont
- Richard Harrington as Jake
- Serhat Metin as Cortez
- Gordon Alexander as Hayes
- John Cummins as Jimmy
- Jeremy Ang Jones as Tsui
- Narges Rashidi as Helena, Patrick's wife
- Jill Winternitz as Angela, Cortez’s wife

== Production ==
On February 19, 2021, it was announced that Gareth Evans was attached to direct the film from a screenplay he wrote under his exclusive deal with Netflix. Evans received sole credit for the screenplay, with Scott Frank and John Lee Hancock receiving off-screen Additional Literary Material credit. Evans was also announced as a producer on the film alongside Tom Hardy and Ed Talfan for Severn Screen as well as Aram Tertzakian of XYZ Films.

Alongside the initial announcement, Hardy was cast in a lead role. Forest Whitaker was added to the cast the following month. In June 2021, Timothy Olyphant, Justin Cornwell, Jessie Mei Li, and Yeo Yann Yann joined the main cast, with Quelin Sepulveda, Luis Guzmán, Sunny Pang, and Michelle Waterson cast in supporting roles.

The film began principal photography on July 8, 2021, in Cardiff, Wales, where production predominantly took place. The film is "one of the biggest films ever to be produced in Wales" and left a "lasting legacy for filmmakers". Hardy was sighted at the Barry Island Pleasure Park in South Wales and outside the Brangwyn Hall in Swansea in July and August 2021 respectively. On October 22, 2021, filming officially wrapped. An initial cut of the film was delivered to the studio in February 2022, but the film needed reshoots, which were delayed until July 2024 due to scheduling conflicts and the SAG-AFTRA strike.

While it was shot primarily in Wales, the film is set in an unnamed fictional United States city, merging elements—such as an elevated train and a Chinatown district—of Chicago, New York, and Philadelphia.

== Release ==
Havoc was released on Netflix on April 25, 2025.

== Reception ==
On the review aggregator website Rotten Tomatoes, 64% of 110 critics' reviews are positive, with an average rating of 6.1/10. The website's consensus reads: "An anemic crime saga punctuated with bravura action sequences, Havoc may feel like a retread of director Gareth Evans' past glories but, for audiences addicted to his balletic style, the formula still rips." Metacritic, which uses a weighted average, assigned the film a score of 57 out of 100, based on 24 critics, indicating "mixed or average" reviews.

=== Viewership ===
According to data from Showlabs, Havoc ranked second on Netflix in the United States during the week of 21–27 April 2025.
