= The InBetween =

American supernatural drama television series

- Genre: Drama
- Created by: Moira Kirland
- Starring: Harriet Dyer; Justin Cornwell; Cindy Luna; Anne-Marie Johnson; Chad James Buchanan; Paul Blackthorne
- Composer: Jeff Russo
- Country of origin: United States
- Original language: English
- No. of seasons: 1
- No. of episodes: 10

Production
- Executive producers: Charlotte Sieling; Nancy Cotton; Matthew Gross; David Heyman; Moira Kirland
- Producers: Christina Malach; Matthew Chipera
- Cinematography: Mike Spragg; Corey Robson; Brian Whittred
- Editors: Nina M. Gilberti; Nathan D. Gunn; Drew Nichols; Natasha Gjurokovic
- Running time: 43 minutes
- Production companies: Look at My New Bag; Heyday Television; Universal Television

Original release
- Network: NBC
- Release: May 29 – August 14, 2019

The InBetween is an American supernatural drama television series created by Moira Kirland that premiered on NBC on May 29 and aired through August 14, 2019.

In November 2019, the series was canceled after one season.

== Premise ==
Cassie Bedford has the ability to see and communicate with ghosts, which can be unpleasant to experience. However, sometimes she is able to help them, and sometimes she is willing. Her foster father, Detective Tom Hackett, knows about her abilities, and his skeptical new partner, a former FBI agent named Damien Asante, becomes a believer when her visions start to help them solve cases.

== Cast and characters ==
=== Main ===
- Harriet Dyer as Cassie Bedford, a bartender with unexplained psychic abilities, including being able to converse with spirits and witnessing moments that have occurred in the past. She copes with her "gift" by using it to aid the police, in part to avoid winding up like her mother, who rejected her gift and abandoned Cassie before succumbing to alcoholism.
- Justin Cornwell as Det. Damien Asante, a former FBI profiler and LAPD detective who transfers to Seattle in search of new opportunities. It is later revealed that he actually transferred to watch over his fiancée Sally, who is presently in a coma.
- Cindy Luna as Det. Maria Salinas, a member of Tom's unit
- Anne-Marie Johnson as Lt. Swanstrom, Tom and Damien's superior.
- Chad James Buchanan as Will, Cassie's coworker and occasional romantic partner. He is currently training to be a chef.
- Paul Blackthorne as Det. Tom Hackett, an English-born officer with the Seattle PD. He and his husband Brian raised Cassie, although Brian is bothered that Tom chooses to exploit Cassie's powers as a police resource.

=== Recurring ===
- Michael B. Silver as Brian Currie, Tom's husband and a professional therapist
- Andres Joseph as Det. Zayn Meier, an investigator specializing in digital tracking and forensics
- Sean Bolger as Ed Roven, a serial killer active in Texas during the 1990s, who was caught and later executed in 2005. He appears as a spirit to Cassie, seeking help leaving the "InBetween".
- Grace Lynn Kung as Amy Shu, medical examiner

== Episodes ==
No.	Title	Directed by	Written by	Original release date	US viewers (millions)
1	"Pilot"	Charlotte Sieling	Moira Kirland	May 29, 2019	3.65
Cassie Bedford, a young woman with latent psychic abilities who occasionally assists her foster father Tom with his police work, is brought in to help with the case of a murder victim, Shannon Bell. Tom's new partner, Damien, correctly deduces that the murderer is a copycat emulating deceased serial killer Ed Roven, but is skeptical of Cassie and her abilities until he finds a clue on Shannon’s body matching one that Cassie saw in a vision. Cassie is also struggling with Abigail, a spirit only she can perceive and who wants Cassie to help her find peace. Using Cassie’s insights, Tom and Damien realize that the killer deliberately staged the crime scene to throw them off, but when Shannon’s abusive ex-boyfriend provides them with an alibi, they have no suspect until Damien rewatches video of Roven and concludes that James Stark, the only one of Roven’s victims to survive, is the copycat, using his job as a paramedic to gain access to Shannon. Cassie delivers a message to Abigail’s incarcerated grandfather, who sexually abused her prior to accidentally overdosing her on sleeping meds, and Abigail leaves her to torment him. Tom and Damien take James into custody, and celebrate with Cassie. Later that night, Cassie wakes up to find Roven’s ghost waiting for her.
2	"Made of Stone"	David Von Ancken	Richard Hatem	June 5, 2019	2.98
Unsure of who he is, Cassie puts up a mental "block" to keep Roven from contacting her, but it fails. Damien and Tom are looking into the disappearance of Karen Sinclair and her son Jason when Cassie has two visions: a woman and her baby and Karen's husband Elliot trying to run her over. Elliot subsequently flees from police custody, leaving an injured Karen behind. Roven stalks Cassie at work and offers to help find Jason. A search of Elliot's phone uncovers a link between him and John McPherson, who lost his family in a hit-and-run committed by Elliot four years ago. The police rescue Elliot, who agrees to sign a confession. Nevertheless, McPherson refuses to help, insisting that Jason must die. With no other options, Damien suggests triggering a new vision from Cassie using video footage of Jason. Roven warns her that doing so means she must "dive straight in", without any fear or hesitation. This leads her to a storage facility, where the police find Jason on the brink of death. McPherson believes he has finally been vindicated, only for Tom to then show him proof that both Karen and Jason are still alive. Roven explains why he reached out to Cassie: he believes she can help him escape the "InBetween".
3	"Where the Shadows Fall"	Ruba Nadda	Nick Parker	June 19, 2019	2.74
While visiting Damian's fiancee Sally at Woodgate Hospital, Cassie encounters the ghost of a young boy and an angry woman in the basement. She also gets tangled in a homicide investigation into the murder of a nurse, Grace Morrow, who turns out to have treated Ethan Grant--the boy Cassie saw. Roven, hoping to earn redemption, offers to help free Ethan's spirit. Tom asks Cassie to stay out of the investigation since hospitals upset her, but she insists. The medical examiner, Amy, tells Damien that Shane Vogel, Ethan's surgeon, denied a request by Grace for a post-mortem test on Ethan's corpse. He then tells Tom why Cassie was at the hospital: to try and connect with Sally. With information from Cassie and Amy, Tom and Damien realize that an angel of mercy has been killing terminal patients like Ethan at Woodgate for years and used another employee's badge to steal lethal drugs to do so. Cassie also identifies the woman from Tom's photos: Ellen Vogel, Shane's late mother. Shane ultimately kills himself rather than be arrested. Refusing to accept Roven's help, Cassie convinces Ellen to leave the basement, but Ethan and the other patients' spirits are already gone. Ethan's friend Avery, now cured of her cancer, tells Cassie that he and the others are safe.
4	"Kiss Them for Me"	Milena Govich	Gabrielle Stanton & Nick Parker	July 3, 2019	2.09
A gunman kills two families hours apart; the connection is that two of the victims attended the same high school. Cassie is visited by the spirit of Edina De Forest, an opioid addict who believes she was murdered; Damien learns that Edina had a lucrative life insurance policy. Tom learns that a fictional entity referred to as "Mr. Nightfall" was the killer, which leads him to Bradley Tennant, a student who took his own life after bullies used Mr. Nightfall to play a cruel prank on him. Cassie finds Edina's car and reports it to Damien, who identifies the fingerprints on it as belonging to a known drug dealer, leaving her feeling stupid for not realizing Edina was still using. A police sting nets Eric Vaughn, Bradley's friend who blames himself for helping set up the prank, and Tom arrests him. Realizing that Edina lied about being murdered because she overdosed, Cassie locates her body so her family can claim the insurance. She then has a vision that exonerates Vaughn, and Tom and Damien discover that Dr. Kelly, the school's guidance counselor, posed as Mr. Nightfall and killed the bullies because his own son committed suicide after being bullied. Cassie fulfills Edina's last wish: reminding her daughter to remember who she was before addiction.
5	"Another Broken Morning"	David Grossman	Julia Fontana	July 10, 2019	2.31
Tom and Damien are assigned to investigate an attempted assassination that leaves a political worker dead, but the main suspect, a gang associate named Olly Navarro, is cleared when his body turns up and the time of death is placed hours before the first murder. Cassie is led to Hannah, Abigail’s mother who currently lives in an abusive relationship out of guilt for failing to protect her daughter; Abigail, in turn, insists that Hannah deserves to suffer. Cassie tells her that her anger is misplaced and lies to Hannah, telling her that Abigail has forgiven her. Encouraged, Hannah tries to contact Abigail's ghost and agrees to speak to Brian about her options. The two victims are linked to a 1988 massacre in the Philippines, committed by a war criminal, Col. Denila, who is living in Seattle under the name George West; Tom and Damien stop him from escaping by sea. Hannah stabs her boyfriend to death when he threatens her baby daughter Crystal, and Tom assures her she won’t face charges. Abigail tells Cassie she is leaving her for good, and that if she finds her mother’s spirit in the InBetween, she’ll tell her to come find her daughter.
6	"The Length of a River"	Alex Zakrzewski	Moira Kirland & Gabrielle Stanton	July 17, 2019	2.30
Melinda, Cassie's old friend, asks her to contact the spirit of her dead fiancee Jenna, but every time she tries, Jenna's spirit dies in a "death echo". Tom and Damien lead a task force to capture the "newlywed killer", a murderer targeting married couples; Damien infers that the murders may be motivated by the killer's contempt for adulterers. Brian suggests that Jenna's strong love for Melinda is keeping her trapped. The police determine that the killer only goes after women in support groups, taking advantage of their strict adherence to confidentiality. Cassie asks for Melinda's engagement ring so Jenna can finally be at peace. Damien picks up a suspect who points to the group coordinator, Lyla James, as the killer. Cassie confirms that Lyla is planning to murder her ex-fiancee and his wife next, and Tom takes her into custody. Cassie tells Brian that she knows he's forgetting things, and asks him to get checked. Jenna's spirit thanks Cassie for giving Melinda closure. Damien expresses dismay that he failed to accurately profile the killer, to which Cassie reminds him that they both can only interpret the evidence they're given.
7	"Let Me in Your Window"	Romeo Tirone	Karen Wyscarver & Sanford Golden	July 24, 2019	2.18
8	"While the Song Remains the Same"	PJ Pesce	Anderson Mackenzie	July 31, 2019	2.55
9	"The Devil's Refugee"	Eduardo Sanchez	Lauren Barnett	August 7, 2019	2.57
10	"Monsters and Angels"	David Von Ancken	Moira Kirland	August 14, 2019	2.30

== Production ==
=== Development ===
On January 12, 2018, it was announced that NBC had given the production a pilot order. The pilot was written by Moira Kirland, who executive produces alongside David Heyman and Nancy Cotton. Production companies involved with the pilot include Heyday Television and Universal Television. On May 10, 2018, it was announced that the production had been given a series order. A few days later, it was announced that the series would premiere as a mid-season replacement in the spring of 2019. On April 1, 2019, it was announced that the series would be held back from mid-season with a premiere date of May 29, 2019.

On November 1, 2019, NBC canceled the series after a single season.

=== Casting ===
In March 2018, it was announced that Yusuf Gatewood, Cindy Luna, and Anne-Marie Johnson had been cast in the pilot's lead roles. Alongside the series order announcement, it was reported that Chad James Buchanan and Paul Blackthorne had joined the cast and that Gatewood's part would be recast. On September 25, 2018, it was announced that Justin Cornwell had been cast to replace Gatewood.

== Reception ==
=== Critical response ===
The review aggregation website Rotten Tomatoes reported a 67% approval rating for the series, based on 9 reviews, with an average rating of 5.42/10.

=== Ratings ===
Viewership and ratings per episode of The InBetween
No.	Title	Air date	Rating/share (18–49)	Viewers (millions)	DVR (18–49)	DVR viewers (millions)	Total (18–49)	Total viewers (millions)
1	"Pilot"	May 29, 2019	0.6/3	3.65	0.3	2.05	0.9	5.70
2	"Made of Stone"	June 5, 2019	0.5/3	2.98	0.3	1.90	0.8	4.89
3	"Where the Shadows Fall"	June 19, 2019	0.4/3	2.74	0.4	2.02	0.8	4.76
4	"Kiss Them For Me"	July 3, 2019	0.3/2	2.09	0.3	1.93	0.6	4.02
5	"Another Broken Morning"	July 10, 2019	0.4/2	2.31	0.3	1.80	0.7	4.11
6	"The Length of a River"	July 17, 2019	0.4/2	2.30	0.3	1.87	0.7	4.17
7	"Let Me in Your Window"	July 24, 2019	0.3/2	2.18	0.3	1.87	0.6	4.05
8	"While the Song Remains the Same"	July 31, 2019	0.4/2	2.55	0.3	1.83	0.7	4.39
9	"The Devil's Refugee"	August 7, 2019	0.4/3	2.57	0.3	1.82	0.7	4.39
10	"Monsters and Angels"	August 14, 2019	0.4/2	2.30	0.3	1.82	0.7	4.12
