= Training Day (TV series) =

2017 American television series

- Official release poster
- Genre: Crime; Thriller
- Based on: Training Day by David Ayer
- Developed by: Will Beall
- Starring: Bill Paxton; Justin Cornwell; Katrina Law; Christina Vidal; Drew Van Acker; Lex Scott Davis; Julie Benz; Marianne Jean-Baptiste
- Composer: Jeff Cardoni
- Country of origin: United States
- Original language: English
- No. of seasons: 1
- No. of episodes: 13

Production
- Executive producers: Antoine Fuqua; Jerry Bruckheimer; Will Beall; Jonathan Littman
- Producer: Bill Paxton
- Running time: 42 minutes
- Production companies: Jerry Bruckheimer Television; Warner Bros. Television

Original release
- Network: CBS
- Release: February 2 – May 20, 2017

Training Day is an American crime-thriller television series that aired on CBS from February 2 to May 20, 2017. The series serves as a follow-up to the 2001 film of the same name. It stars Bill Paxton and Justin Cornwell, and is known for being one of Paxton's final performances prior to his death in February 2017.

== Premise ==
Fifteen years after the events of the film, the series follows Officer Kyle Craig (Justin Cornwell) as he infiltrates the LAPD Special Investigation Section (SIS) by becoming a partner with the morally ambiguous Detective Frank Roarke (Bill Paxton), whose off-the-books record has attracted the attention of the LAPD.

== Cast and characters ==
=== Main ===
- Bill Paxton as Detective Frank Roarke, maverick head of LAPD's SIS whose penchant for operating in a gray area to fight the war on crime is called into question.
- Justin Cornwell as Officer Kyle Craig, a rookie cop posing as Frank's new partner in order to keep an eye on Frank.
- Julie Benz as Holly Butler, a Hollywood madam who is in a romantic relationship with Frank.
- Katrina Law as Detective Rebecca Lee, an officer with the SIS, a unit that goes after the worst of the worst. She was rescued from human traffickers by Frank when she was four years old, and looks up to him as the father she never had.
- Drew Van Acker as Detective Tommy Campbell, another SIS officer and a former pro surfer.
- Christina Vidal as Detective III Valeria Chavez, an investigator in Robbery Homicide Division.
- Lex Scott Davis as Alyse Arrendondo, a history teacher who is Kyle's smart, cynical wife.
- Marianne Jean-Baptiste as Deputy Chief Joy Lockhart, Frank's former supervisor and Kyle's current supervisor who sent him undercover to investigate Frank.

=== Recurring ===
- Noel Gugliemi as Moreno, who appeared in the original film.
- Max Martini as Jack Ivers

=== Guest ===
- Jamie McShane as Special Agent Gerald Lynch
- Charles Baker as Clancy Trussell
- Louis Herthum as Henry Hollister
- Lou Diamond Phillips as Thurman Ballesteros
- Brian Van Holt as Jeff Cullen
- W. Earl Brown as Chief Wade
- Eugene Byrd as Detective Windowski
- Jim Piddock as Abel Cribbs
- Thomas F. Wilson as Gary Millstone
- Tom Berenger as Asst. District Attorney Stan Gursky, who appeared in the original film.
- Raymond J. Barry as LAPD Capt. Lou Jacobs, who appeared in the original film.

== Episodes ==
No.	Title	Directed by	Written by	Original release date	Prod. code	US viewers (millions)
1	"Apocalypse Now"	Danny Cannon	Will Beall	February 2, 2017	T15.10137	4.73
LAPD deputy chief Joy Lockhart assigns Kyle Craig, a rookie and an idealistic officer, to go undercover in the Special Investigation Section (SIS) to bring down the unit's notorious leader Frank Roarke, a rogue detective and the partner of Kyle's late father.
2	"Tehrangeles"	Louis Milito	Barry Schindel	February 9, 2017	T13.20403	4.44
Female assassin Lina Farzan, a former member of Muammar Gaddafi's Amazonian Guard, becomes involved in the kidnapping of one girl and Frank's rogue tactics will put the girl's life at even greater risk or save her life.
3	"Trigger Time"	Nathan Hope	Will Beall	February 16, 2017	T13.20402	3.83
The notorious hitman known as "El Cucuy" is targeting members of the Russian Mafia in Los Angeles; the rift between Kyle and Frank grows when Kyle refuses to adhere to one of Frank's morally ambiguous rules.
4	"Code of Honor"	Milan Cheylov	Rebecca Dameron	February 23, 2017	T13.20404	3.62
Frank's quest for revenge after a longtime friend and informant is killed by the Yakuza; this situation puts Frank and Kyle at odds with an FBI agent whose operation against the Yakuza is jeopardized. Note: This was the last Training Day episode that aired during Bill Paxton's lifetime. This was aired two days before his death.
5	"Wages of Sin"	Steven Adelson	Robert Port	March 2, 2017	T13.20405	4.33
Kyle is forced to help Frank clear his name after Lockhart opens an internal investigation into a past shooting which could cost Frank his badge and freedom.
6	"Faultlines"	Matt Earl Beesley	Ian Shorr	March 9, 2017	T13.20406	4.03
SIS Detective Tommy Campbell helps an old friend connected to an investigation into weapons trafficking. Lockhart demands to see results from Kyle's investigation into Frank's actions.
7	"Quid Pro Quo"	Eagle Egilsson	Maisha Closson	April 8, 2017	T13.20407	2.56
Frank involves Kyle in a plan to take down a criminal defense attorney who has been helping his clients eliminate witnesses; this puts Craig's morals in test.
8	"Blurred Lines"	Steve Shill	Terence Paul Winter	April 15, 2017	T13.20408	2.61
The SIS unit hunt for a father-and-son crime team becomes personal for Frank, who is forced to face the parallels between the duo and his own childhood as the son of an outlaw.
9	"Bad Day at Aqua Mesa"	Jeffrey Hunt	Clay Senechal	April 22, 2017	T13.20409	3.20
A community organizer is accidentally killed in a gang-related shooting and Frank and Kyle seek justice for her.
10	"Sunset"	Larry Teng	Alexi Hawley	April 29, 2017	T13.20410	2.63
When several of Holly's call girls go missing, the SIS investigate an eccentric, reclusive Hollywood producer.
11	"Tunnel Vision"	Christine Moore	Rebecca Dameron	May 6, 2017	T13.20411	3.19
Frank gets a hot tip from one of his informers about new top shelf heroin in the streets, coming from Afghanistan, and the team with the help of the FBI and Homeland Security agent Jack Ivers began hunting the suspected terrorist; this takes a emotional toll on Kyle who is convinced that he encountered the suspect, during his service in Afghanistan.
12	"Elegy"	Anton Cropper	Alec Wells & Greg Yeoman	May 13, 2017	T13.20412	2.51
Frank and Kyle are looking for clues about Billy Craig's murder. Frank is pressing Jack Ivers, who is revealed to be working for the State Department and possibly an undercover CIA agent, and Kyle talks with the 3 wise men; and learns that Frank has been lying to him about the circumstances surrounding his father's death. Frank finds the other key, but is attacked next to Kyle and Lockhart by Ivers' hit team. Lockhart is injured in the confrontation. Alyse goes to her mother's house leaving Kyle. Frank and Kyle get into an argument and a fight that has to be broken up by Rebecca and Tommy but Frank steals the keys from Kyle.
13	"Elegy Part: 2"	Eriq La Salle	Story by : Bianca Sams & John Covarrubias; Teleplay by : Will Beall	May 20, 2017	T13.20413	2.60
Kyle confronts Frank about the keys. Frank eventually shoots Kyle with beanbags and leaves him handcuffed. Frank goes on a rogue mission to Las Viboras, Mexico, forms a team to rob a drug cartel bank in Sinaloa with a bounty of $8 million. Frank gets the safe deposit box during the robbery, but Detective Chavez calls an old enemy of Frank's, a corrupt Mexican police chief that works for the cartel, who goes to Mexico and catches Frank. A drug kingpin reveals Frank's whereabouts to Kyle, who gets Rebecca and Tommy to help him rescue Frank. Jack Ivers is actually working with the cartel and injects Frank with drugs to question him about his knowledge of Project Leviathan. Frank's team infiltrates the compound and rescues him, but Ivers burns the LAPD files on Leviathan during the shooting and escapes. Kyle and Frank find a photo of Ivers with former corrupt LAPD cop Tim Wallace from the burnt files. In L.A., Kyle and Frank interrogate Wallace. Wallace admits to killing Kyle's father, who was close to uncovering Leviathan, a group of corrupt police, drug cartels, and the CIA. Frank kills Wallace before Kyle shoots him. Frank reports Wallace's killing as self-defense and Kyle backs it up; Frank promotes Kyle from trainee to partner.

== Production ==
=== Development ===
On August 7, 2015, it was announced that Antoine Fuqua had decided to develop a television series based on a movie, and had teamed with Jerry Bruckheimer to develop the concept. Warner Bros. Television was shopping the show to the American broadcast networks. Will Beall would write the series, while Fuqua would serve as executive producer, and would direct the potential pilot. CBS ordered a pilot on August 14, 2015. In addition to Fuqua, Bruckheimer, Beall, and Jonathan Littman will serve as executive producers for the series, which is set 15 years after the original film. On February 19, 2016, it was announced that Danny Cannon would direct the pilot instead of Fuqua.

=== Casting ===
On February 26, 2016, it was announced that Bill Paxton had joined the production as Frank Rourke, an older, veteran police officer similar to Denzel Washington's character Alonzo Harris in the original movie. Several additional cast members were announced in March 2016. Katrina Law plays Detective Rebecca Lee, an officer with the LAPD's Special Investigation Section (S.I.S.), a unit that goes after the worst of the worst. Drew Van Acker is Tommy Campbell, another S.I.S. officer who is a former pro surfer. Lex Scott Davis is Alyse Arrendondo, a history teacher who is Kyle Craig's wife. Julie Benz is Holly Butler, a Hollywood madam who has a tacit understanding with Frank. Finally, Justin Cornwell was cast as Kyle Craig, Frank's young partner and an analog of Ethan Hawke's character, Jake Hoyt, in the original movie.

=== Cancellation ===
On February 25, 2017, lead actor Bill Paxton died of a stroke at age 61 due to complications from heart surgery. A day later, CBS stated that all 13 commissioned episodes had already been filmed before his death, as shooting already wrapped up in December 2016. On May 17, 2017, CBS announced it would not be commissioning any further episodes of Training Day in light of Paxton's death.

== Reception ==
Training Day received generally negative reviews from critics. On Rotten Tomatoes, the season has a rating of 24% based on 33 reviews, with an average rating of 4.2/10. The site's critical consensus reads, "Training Day falls short of recapturing the excellence of the film in its television incarnation -- and fails to distinguish itself from the current squad of tired police procedurals." On Metacritic, the season has a score of 38 out of 100, based on 27 critics, indicating "generally unfavorable reviews".

=== Ratings ===
Viewership and ratings per episode of Training Day
No.	Title	Air date	Rating/share (18–49)	Viewers (millions)
1	"Apocalypse Now"	February 2, 2017	0.9/3	4.73
2	"Tehrangeles"	February 9, 2017	0.8/3	4.44
3	"Trigger Time"	February 16, 2017	0.7/3	3.83
4	"Code of Honor"	February 23, 2017	0.6/2	3.62
5	"Wages of Sin"	March 2, 2017	0.8/3	4.33
6	"Faultlines"	March 9, 2017	0.7/3	4.03
7	"Quid Pro Quo"	April 8, 2017	0.4/2	2.56
8	"Blurred Lines"	April 15, 2017	0.3/1	2.61
9	"Bad Day at Aqua Mesa"	April 22, 2017	0.4/2	3.20
10	"Sunset"	April 29, 2017	0.3/1	2.63
11	"Tunnel Vision"	May 6, 2017	0.4/2	3.19
12	"Elegy"	May 13, 2017	0.3/1	2.51
13	"Elegy, Part 2"	May 20, 2017	0.3/1	2.60
