= Zach Villa =

American actor and musician (born 1987)

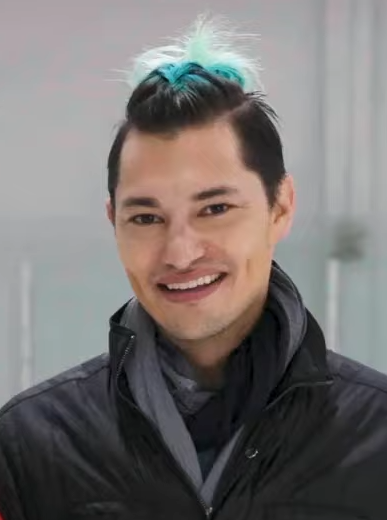
- Villa in 2020
- Born: March 17, 1987 (age 39); Clinton, Iowa, U.S.
- Education: Juilliard School (BFA)
- Occupations: Actor; singer; songwriter; dancer; musician
- Years active: 2011–present
- Partner: Ashley Atwell (2024-present)

Zach Villa (born March 17, 1987) is an American actor and musician. Villa was born in Clinton, Iowa. He is best known for his role as real-life serial killer Richard Ramirez in the ninth and the thirteenth season of the FX anthology horror series American Horror Story, titled American Horror Story: 1984 and American Horror Story: 13, respectively, and his artistic experience through the band Cylvia. Villa plays piano, drums, bass, guitar, and violin.

== Personal life ==
He was born to Mexican parents in Clinton, Iowa. In January 2015, Villa and his bandmate Evan Rachel Wood announced they were engaged. Their band was called Rebel and a Basketcase. The couple ended their engagement in September 2017.

Since June 2017, Villa is lead vocalist and guitarist in the band Sorry Kyle.

== Filmography ==
=== Film ===
Year	Title	Role	Notes
2014	Jesus Year	Phil	Short film
2015	Honeyglue	Jordan	
2016	Cardboard Boxer	Tyler	
2017	A Break in White	5	Short film
2018	Destroyer	Arturo Guerrero	
2019	As You Like It	Orlando	
2022	Hypochondriac	Will	
2022	Good Mourning	Angel	
2022	Vengeance	Sancholo	
2024	Guns & Moses	Detective Nestor	

=== Television ===
Year	Title	Role	Notes
2011	Archer	Bishop (voice)	Episode: "The Double Deuce"
2013	NCIS: Los Angeles	Javier Ramos	Episode: "Resurrection"
2016	Bordertown	Carlos Sanchez (voice)	8 episodes
2017	Dan Is Dead	Dashiell Lowman	8 episodes
2018	The Expanse	Manéo "Néo" Jung-Espinoza	Episode: "Delta-V"
2019	Shameless	Dax	3 episodes
2019	American Horror Story: 1984	Richard Ramirez	9 episodes
2021	Station 19	Charlie	2 episodes
2022	Archive 81	Chris Lee	1 episode
2026	American Horror Story: 13	Richard Ramirez	3 episodes

=== Video games ===
Year	Title	Voice role
2016	Batman: The Telltale Series	Cop / Drug Dealer / Reporter / Thug / Thug Boss / Bar Patron
2019	Final Fantasy XV: Episode Ardyn	Somnus Lucis Caelum
