= Indiana Jones and the Great Circle =

2024 video game

- Developer: MachineGames
- Publisher: Bethesda Softworks
- Directors: Jerk Gustafsson; Axel Torvenius
- Producers: John Jennings; Mattias Duclos; Mariusz Macieja
- Designers: Jens Andersson; Zeke Virant
- Programmer: Magnus Auvinen
- Artist: Mattias Astenvald
- Writer: Tommy Tordsson Björk
- Composer: Gordy Haab
- Series: Indiana Jones
- Engine: Motor
- Platforms: Windows; Xbox Series X/S; PlayStation 5; Nintendo Switch 2
- Release: December 9, 2024: Windows, Xbox Series X/S; December 9, 2024; PlayStation 5; April 17, 2025; Nintendo Switch 2; May 12, 2026
- Genres: Action-adventure, stealth
- Mode: Single-player

Indiana Jones and the Great Circle is a 2024 action-adventure video game developed by MachineGames and published by Bethesda Softworks. It is based on the Indiana Jones franchise and features an original narrative set between the events of Raiders of the Lost Ark (1981) and Indiana Jones and the Last Crusade (1989). The story follows archaeologist Indiana Jones in 1937 as he attempts to thwart various groups who are seeking to harness a power connected to the Great Circle, a group of mysterious sites around the world that form a perfect circle on a map. The game is primarily first-person, with third-person being employed for cutscenes and contextual elements such as environmental interaction. The player controls Jones as he navigates through a mix of linear, story-sensitive areas and wider, exploratory landscapes in locations such as Vatican City, the Giza pyramid complex, and Sukhothai.

Todd Howard conceived the game's story and served as an executive producer, considering the game a passion project of his. MachineGames was chosen to lead the project because of their experience creating the modern Wolfenstein games, which also involved Nazis and Axis allies as central antagonists. Development of the game lasted for more than five years. It was designed to be an "adventure-first" video game, and the team was particularly inspired by Indiana Jones and the Fate of Atlantis (1992). Its gameplay structure was inspired by Metro Exodus (2019), and its level design was inspired by immersive sims. Troy Baker provides the voice and motion capture of Indiana Jones, and Alessandra Mastronardi, Marios Gavrilis and Tony Todd are featured in supporting roles. Gordy Haab served as the game's composer, and its original score were recorded at Abbey Road Studios.

Bethesda and MachineGames jointly announced the game's development in January 2021, in collaboration with Lucasfilm Games. The game was released for Windows and Xbox Series X/S in December 2024. A PlayStation 5 version was released in April 2025, and a Nintendo Switch 2 version was released in May 2026. The game received generally positive reviews, with critics praising the gameplay, level design, story, the performance of the cast, and its faithfulness to its source material. It attracted more than 4 million players. The game received multiple year-end nominations including Game of the Year at the D.I.C.E. Awards, as well as Best Game at the 22nd British Academy Games Awards. It received a downloadable story expansion titled The Order of Giants in September 2025.

== Gameplay ==
In the game, the player can pick up various objects and use them as melee weapons against enemies.

Indiana Jones and the Great Circle is an action-adventure game, in which the player assumes control of archaeologist Indiana Jones. The game is primarily played from a first-person perspective, but switches to a third-person view for cutscenes and certain gameplay actions, such as when Jones uses his whip to swing over gaps or when climbing pipes and walls. The player can separately adjust the difficulty of the game's combat and its puzzle-solving and exploration.

Similar to immersive sims, levels in the game have alternate routes for the player to reach their objectives. Some of the levels, such as Vatican City, Gizeh and Sukhothai, are larger, sandbox locations which can be explored freely by the player. In addition to the main quest, they may encounter other non-playable characters who will give them side quests tied to the main narrative, and discover collectibles such as ancient relics and medicine bottles. Through exploration, the player can also collect Adventure Books, providing permanent boosts in the game, improving weapon performance and durability, enhancing Jones's combat skills, and increasing his health and stamina. The gameplay perks provided in Adventure Books must be unlocked using Adventure Points, which can be earned by photographing objects of interest, opening safes and chests, and collecting relics and field notes. The player may also encounter various puzzles, many of which are optional. Photographing a puzzle repeatedly using Jones's camera will provide them with additional hints for solving it. Jones eventually unlocks more tools for exploration and solving puzzles, such as a lighter for illuminating dark areas and lighting torches, and a rebreather that allows him to dive underwater.

The player can choose to use stealth tactics, such as crouching and hiding behind cover to avoid an enemy's line of sight, and hiding bodies from patrolling enemies. Disguises can be worn to access restricted areas, though some high-level enemies can see through disguises; committing crimes such as stealing or behaving menacingly will also cause a disguise to fail. Jones can pick up various objects in the world, such as shovels, wrenches and broomsticks, and use them as makeshift weapons. They can also be thrown to distract enemies. While the weapons in the game are easily broken, some can be repaired. Jones is also equipped with a revolver, though ammunition is scarce. During melee fights, Jones can punch hostile enemies with his fist, or push them away. He can also block and parry incoming attacks, or dodge them. Jones's whip can be used for traversal, puzzle-solving, and combat. Targeting the upper limbs of an enemy disarms them, while targeting their lower limbs causes them to trip and fall towards Jones. All gameplay actions, such as fighting enemies, sprinting, and climbing, consume stamina, which regenerate slowly if he rests briefly. Eating bread and fruits found in the game can provide additional bonuses to Jones's health and stamina, respectively, while using bandages restores lost health.

== Plot ==
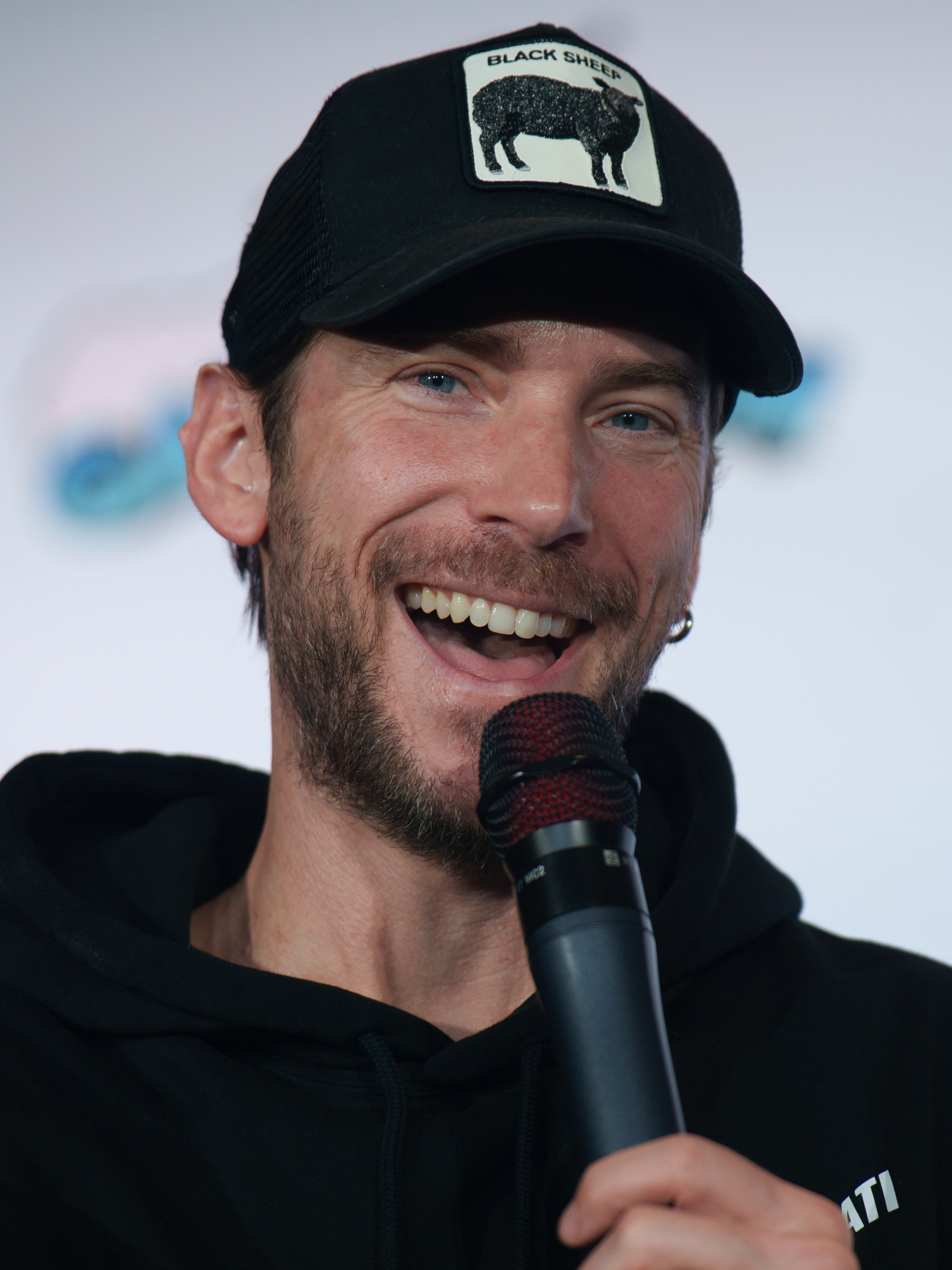
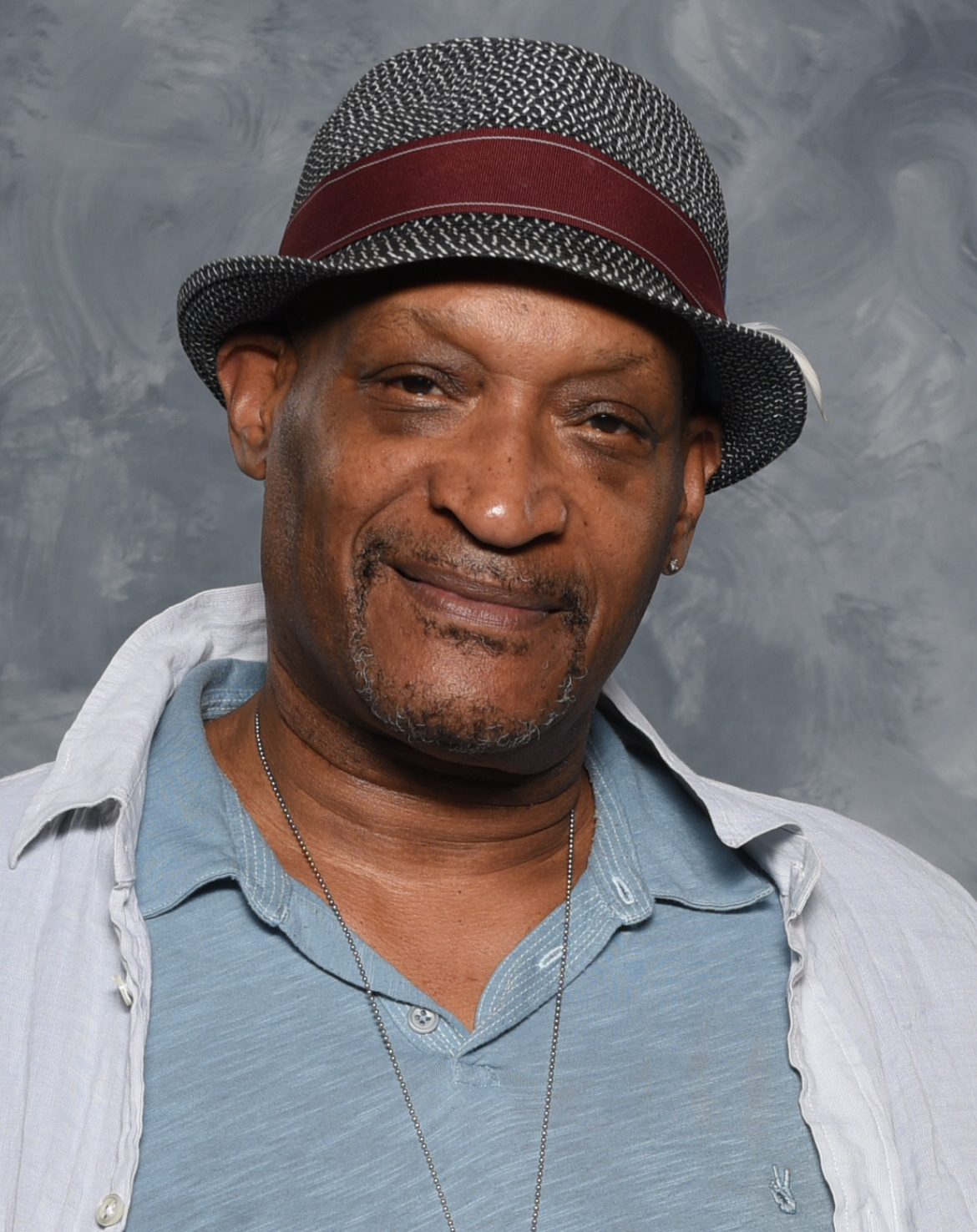
The Great Circle featured Troy Baker as Indiana Jones and served as the final video game credit of actor Tony Todd, who died a month before its release.

In 1937, Indiana Jones returns to Marshall College after leaving his fiancée Marion Ravenwood. A giant man named Locus breaks into the College, steals a cat mummy, and knocks Jones unconscious before leaving. Jones notices Locus's medallion bears a symbol resembling that of the Vatican Secret Archive and infiltrates Vatican City for answers. The city is under the control of Italian dictator Benito Mussolini and the Blackshirts, who have been working with Nazi German archeologist and occultist Emmerich Voss. Jones meets reporter Ginetta "Gina" Lombardi, who is investigating Voss for her sister Laura's disappearance; the two team up. They discover that a tribe of giants called the "Nephilim Order" have been covertly working for the Roman Catholic Church to protect the secret of the "Great Circle", and that the cat mummy contains a special stone related to it. Voss steals the Order's stones and flees as Jones and Gina stow away on his zeppelin. Jones then explains the Great Circle is a group of sacred religious sites across the world that form a perfect circle, and that he fears that Voss has discovered some secret to its power.

Arriving at a Nazi dig in Gizeh, Jones learns the Order has been working with Egyptians for thousands of years prior to the Catholic Church's foundation. The pair then finds the Idol of Ra to take its stone, but Voss recovers it and leaves Jones for dead in the desert. Gina rescues Jones and the pair travel to the Himalayas, where they learn the third stone has transported a Nazi battleship from South America to the Himalayas. After finding Laura frozen to death, Jones is captured by a Nazi colonel named Viktor Gantz. Gina sets off a grenade, which allows Jones to escape but sends the Nazi battleship skidding down the mountain. Jones is able to use the third stone to open a portal, transporting them to Shanghai in the midst of the Japanese invasion of the city, where Gantz dies. After hijacking a Japanese fighter plane, the pair travel to the nearest Great Circle ruin in Sukhothai, Siam. Locus confronts them during their search, warning that the Great Circle's secret must never come to light, but Jones ignores his warnings. Voss attacks them as Jones collects the stone. As they escape, Gina is captured.

Seeing that Jones attaches more importance to Gina than the stones, Locus helps him follow Voss's trail. At the last site for the Great Circle, the Ziggurat of Ur, Locus summons the Nephilim Order to attack the Nazis, allowing Jones to rescue Gina. Ignoring Locus's warnings, the pair travel deeper and find Noah's Ark. Voss captures them and reveals that the Great Circle is related to all of the flood myths in history, with God granting Noah the power of the Great Circle to travel around the world to collect two of every animal and eventually repopulate the world. Voss intends to use this power to help the Nazis take over the world. Voss activates the Great Circle's power, causing another Great Flood. Voss brawls with Jones before being killed by the unstable power of the Ark. Locus teleports the Ark away through another portal, averting the flood. Afterwards, despite sharing feelings for each other, Gina parts ways with Jones for the sake of her career.

In a secret ending, Jones discovers a hidden mural showing all of the locations on the Great Circle pointing to the South Pole. There, footprints in the snow are seen leading away from Noah's Ark, suggesting that Locus has survived.

=== The Order of Giants ===
The Order of Giants downloadable content takes place during the Vatican City portion of the main game. Indiana Jones encounters Father Orlando Ricci, a young scholar who is researching a legendary figure known as the Nameless Crusader. The Nameless Crusader's helmet and armor were ensconced in a secret chamber under a palace built by Pope Paul IV. Ricci was barred from the palace and he prevails upon Jones to search it and then visit him at his family estate in Rome to share his findings. Jones locates the armor and a key that opens a passage to the underground tomb of a giant named Junia, which holds the first of three pieces of a carved stone cylinder.

As he travels to Ricci's estate, Jones notices that Mussolini's Blackshirts are also looking for Ricci. Ricci and Jones deduce that the other two pieces of the cylinder can also be found in the secret tombs of two other giants: Abgal, an undefeated gladiator known as "the Minotaur," and Gibborim, the Nameless Crusader. Jones retrieves the cylinder pieces while encountering members of a modern Cult of Mithras lurking in Rome's sewers.

The cylinder reveals that it is a key to the resting chamber of the still-living Abgal. Ricci absconds with the cylinder and is exposed as the head of the Cult of Mithras. Ricci's goal has been to find Abgal and sacrifice him to gain enlightenment. Jones pursues Ricci into the temple, defeats the cult, and unseals the gate that leads to Abgal's chamber. Ricci ambushes Jones, but as the cultist attempts to stab Abgal, the giant awakens and strangles him. Abgal then raises his chamber into the center of the Colosseum and challenges Jones to a fight. Jones wins and then makes his way back to Vatican City.

== Development ==
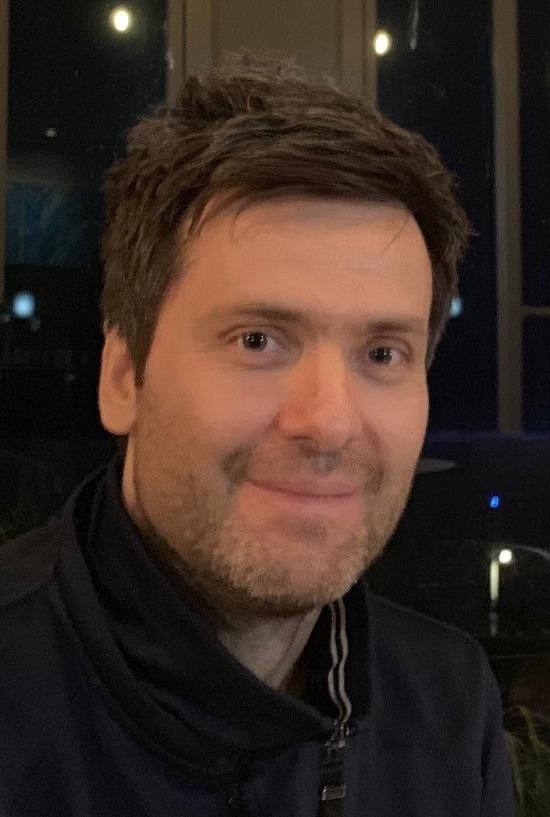
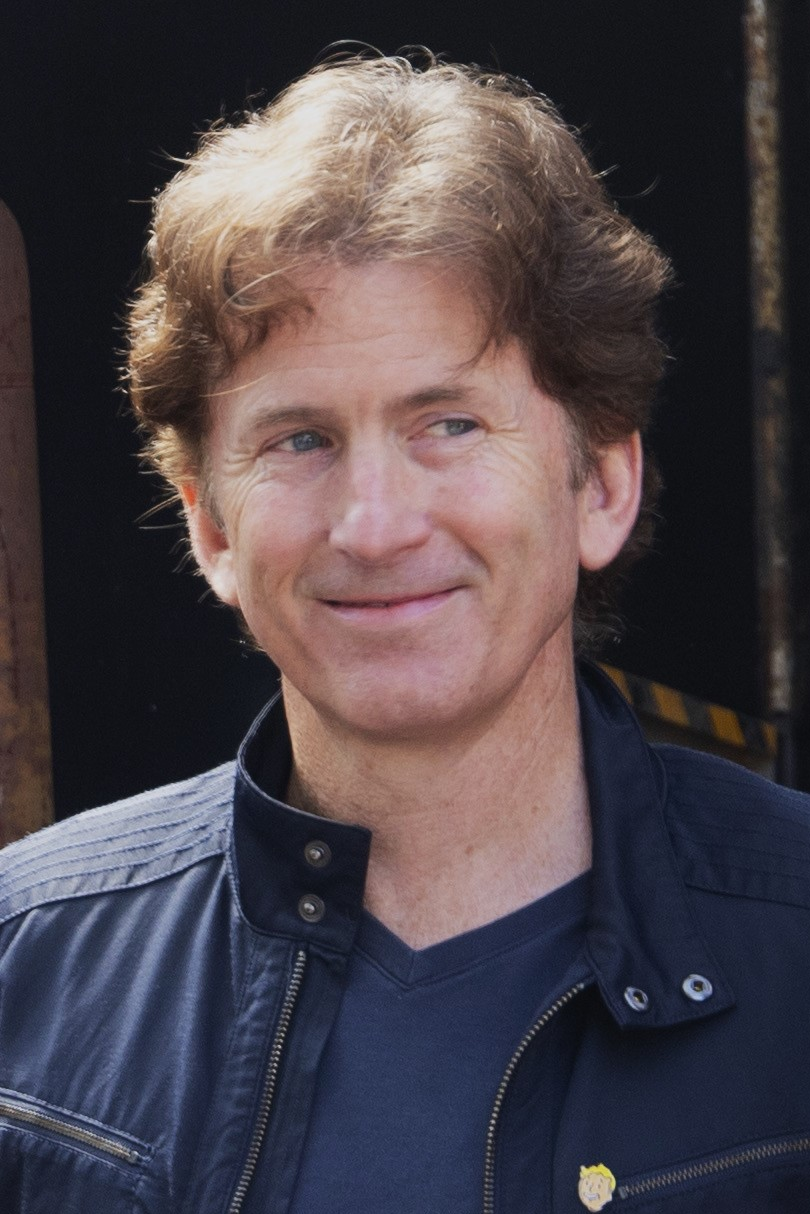
Director Jerk Gustafsson (left) and executive producer Todd Howard (right)

The game was executively produced by Todd Howard, a game director at Bethesda Game Studios known for his work on role-playing video games such as The Elder Scrolls and Fallout. Howard, an Indiana Jones fan, had previously pitched such a game to franchise creator George Lucas around 2009, although the project did not move forward at that time, partly because Bethesda did not have the resources to develop it. In addition, Lucasfilm wanted to publish the game, a role that Bethesda sought to fill, and the two could not come to an agreement, so Howard and his team moved on to The Elder Scrolls V: Skyrim (2011). Since 2016, Disney, the owner of Lucasfilm, has opted not to self-publish its games and started licensing its franchises to external partners. Negotiations between Bethesda and Lucasfilm started again in 2019, after John Drake, a friend of Howard, was appointed as Disney's VP of Business Development and Licensing for Games. The Great Circle was Lucasfilm's first non-Star Wars game in years, and the first Indiana Jones game since Indiana Jones Adventure World (2011).

MachineGames was chosen by Howard to develop the project because of its work on the Wolfenstein series, which also has Nazis as antagonists. Jerk Gustafsson served as the game's director. Jens Andersson joined the project as design director in late 2022, after formerly being hired in the same position for the previously pitched game. Andersson had also served as lead designer on The Chronicles of Riddick: Escape from Butcher Bay (2004) and The Darkness (2007). The Indiana Jones team included more than 20 developers who previously worked on The Darkness. Development of the game lasted for more than five years.

=== Gameplay ===
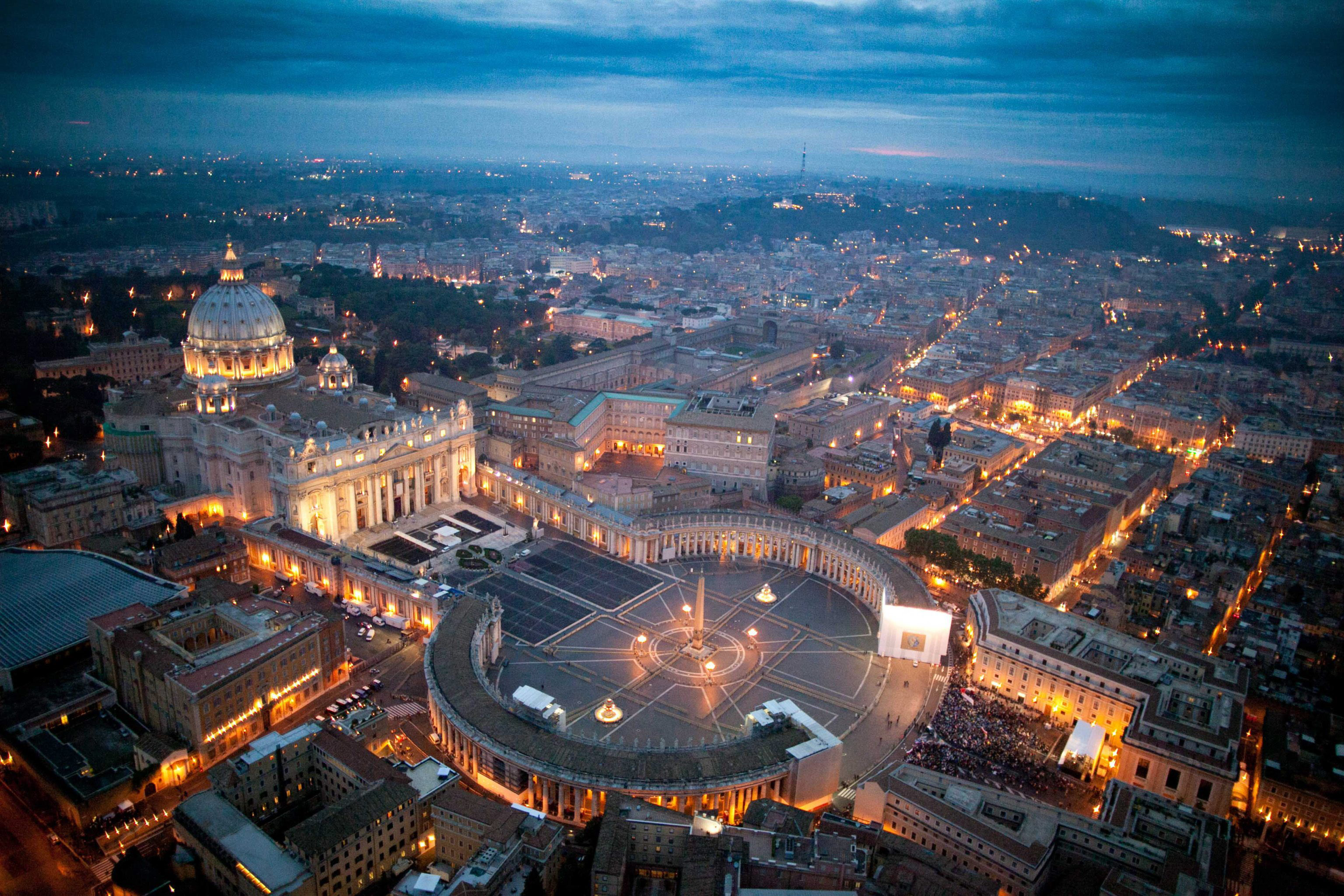
Vatican City serves as one of the game's hub locations that the player can revisit multiple times.

Several levels in the game are large, non-linear levels, as the team wanted to extend the game's longevity. The team experimented with the Uberkommandant missions in Wolfenstein II: The New Colossus (2017), which allowed players revisit levels, and they were inspired by Metro Exodus's (2019) structure, in which the game had a linear narrative while still having large, sandbox areas where players have more freedom to explore and complete side content. Vatican City was the first such "hub" level and served as the game's vertical slice. The team described the Vatican as the most complicated level in the game because it was the level where the developers experimented with different design choices. They decided early on that it cannot be a one-to-one recreation of the city, as they were unable to funnel players across major locations of the map or have them explore certain key buildings or areas. To enhance the sandbox experience, the team initially designed "treasure hunts", which were essentially fetch quests that guide players across various map locations, though these were later reworked into 'mysteries' with richer narratives. These quests were mainly short activities—or ones that enriched the main narrative—as the team did not want to them to draw the player's attention away from the optimal path. Mysteries were primarily intended to enliven the game's world, with the player encountering these optional narratives simply through exploration, evoking a sense of adventure. To ensure the depiction of the locations in the game were authentic, the team read books and images and reimagined how they would have looked in the 1930s.

Design of some of these locations was inspired by immersive sims, which give multiple ways for players to infiltrate and reach their objectives. Disguises introduced an additional way for players to interact with the map and the environment. The team also worked to ensure the game was immersive, making sure that the game's user interface is presented diegetically using Indiana's journal. Hannah Hoffman, a member of the level design team, also pushed for having a "living world", in which players can identify small ways to interact with non-player characters by being attentive. An optional waypoint system was added to the game late in its development. Like prior projects from MachineGames, the game uses first-person perspective, making it distinct from third-person adventure games. The first-person viewpoint was also chosen to immerse the player in the role of Indiana Jones. Certain actions and cutscenes switch to third-person, to show the character on-screen as much as possible. As with Wolfenstein II, the team built a full-body model of the player character, which can be seen from a first-person perspective.

The character of Indiana Jones himself served as a guide for gameplay design, as developers wanted to ensure that every action he takes feels in character. According to creative director Axel Torvenius, Indiana is not a gunslinger and instead a "teacher and a somewhat clumsy archeologist". As a result, the team deprioritized the use of guns in combat and positioned them as a last resort. Though many guns are available, Indiana is easily killed during gunfights, and using firearms will attract the attention of other enemies in the area. According to Andersson, the team tested several ways to discourage gun use, including a Grand Theft Auto-inspired wanted system. In the end, they landed on two solutions: lengthening reload times and introducing breakable weapons to push players toward melee combat. The game was designed to be generous, as developers considered Indiana Jones a lucky character. Therefore, the team populated it with abundant pick-ups and ensured he could quickly escape combat, so the player never feels compelled to fire a gun. As the team was used to making run and gun games using heavy weaponry in the Wolfenstein series, it took the team a lot of time to readjust for a slower-paced gameplay. Describing Indiana as an "unlikely" hero, the team wanted the melee combat system to be "semi-chaotic", in which Indiana must rely on his wits and improvise using what he can find. As a result, the game has a lot of environmental objects, including guns, that the player can pick up and use as a melee weapons. Designing the whip, especially its game physics and simulation, was also difficult for MachineGames, especially as level designers felt it necessary to create scenarios in the game where the whip is consistently implemented. The team consulted with a Swedish bullwhip champion to record visual and audio references.

Andersson described The Great Circle as an "adventure-first" video game. Early in development, the team created a pie chart denoting the proportion of the game devoted to six pillars: Hand-to-Hand, Platforming, Exploration & Puzzles, Infiltration, Set-Pieces, and Shooting. The team took an extensive amount of time balancing different facets of gameplay, and attempted to juxtapose setpieces with slower moments in which Indiana is simply exploring the environment and unraveling its mysteries. Adventure games by LucasArts, such as Indiana Jones and the Fate of Atlantis (1992), served as sources of inspiration for the team. Puzzles in the game were designed to be complicated and varied. However, the team feared players may visit YouTube to look for solutions while playing the game, breaking their immersion. Therefore, they implemented a hint system in which Indiana will provide additional clues whenever the player takes a picture of a puzzle. To make the game more accessible and support players who are uninterested in solving puzzles, the game allows players to separately lower the difficulty of adventure aspect of the game.

=== Story, characters and casting ===
The team developed the narrative of the game first. It was always considered to be a globe-trotting adventure, as the team felt that limiting players to one location would not be exciting, and that the game would have better pacing if different biomes are introduced. Howard also helped conceive the story, in particular the Great Circle concept. Gustafsson was heavily inspired by Raiders of the Lost Ark and matinee adventure movies, and envisioned The Great Circle as a "lost Indiana Jones adventure from the 1980s", one that evokes the same "tone and spirit" without repeating old plot threads. The team collaborated with cinematographer Kyle Klutz, who served as the game's Director of Photography, in order to imitate the filmmaking style and cinematography of Steven Spielberg's films. The Great Circle was MachineGames' biggest game to date, with nearly four hours of cutscenes. Due to the frequent appearance of the Axis Powers' forces and propaganda in the game, the game also includes a cultural sensitivity warning that appears when the player begins the game for the first time, indicating that the game and its developers condemn the Axis Powers' war crimes.

The game uses Indiana Jones actor Harrison Ford's likeness, while Troy Baker provides voiceover work for the character. Ford was never considered to reprise the role due to his age, while Howard initially did not want Baker for the role (as he told him in a Zoom meeting). Baker initially turned down the role upon being approached as he found the offer too daunting, but MachineGames' motion capture team changed his mind. He auditioned with dozens of actors until only he and another actor remained, as the team chose Baker every time despite him not impressing Howard at first. As Indiana is a polyglot, Baker worked with language coaches to ensure he could perform some of his lines in Italian or Latin. The story of the game reveals an impulsive side of Indiana, and explores his "obsession" with the past and how they prevented him from maintaining relationships with the ones he loved. The writers used recurring characters, including Marcus Brody and Marion Ravenwood, to set up the adventure early in the game, before introducing the new characters.

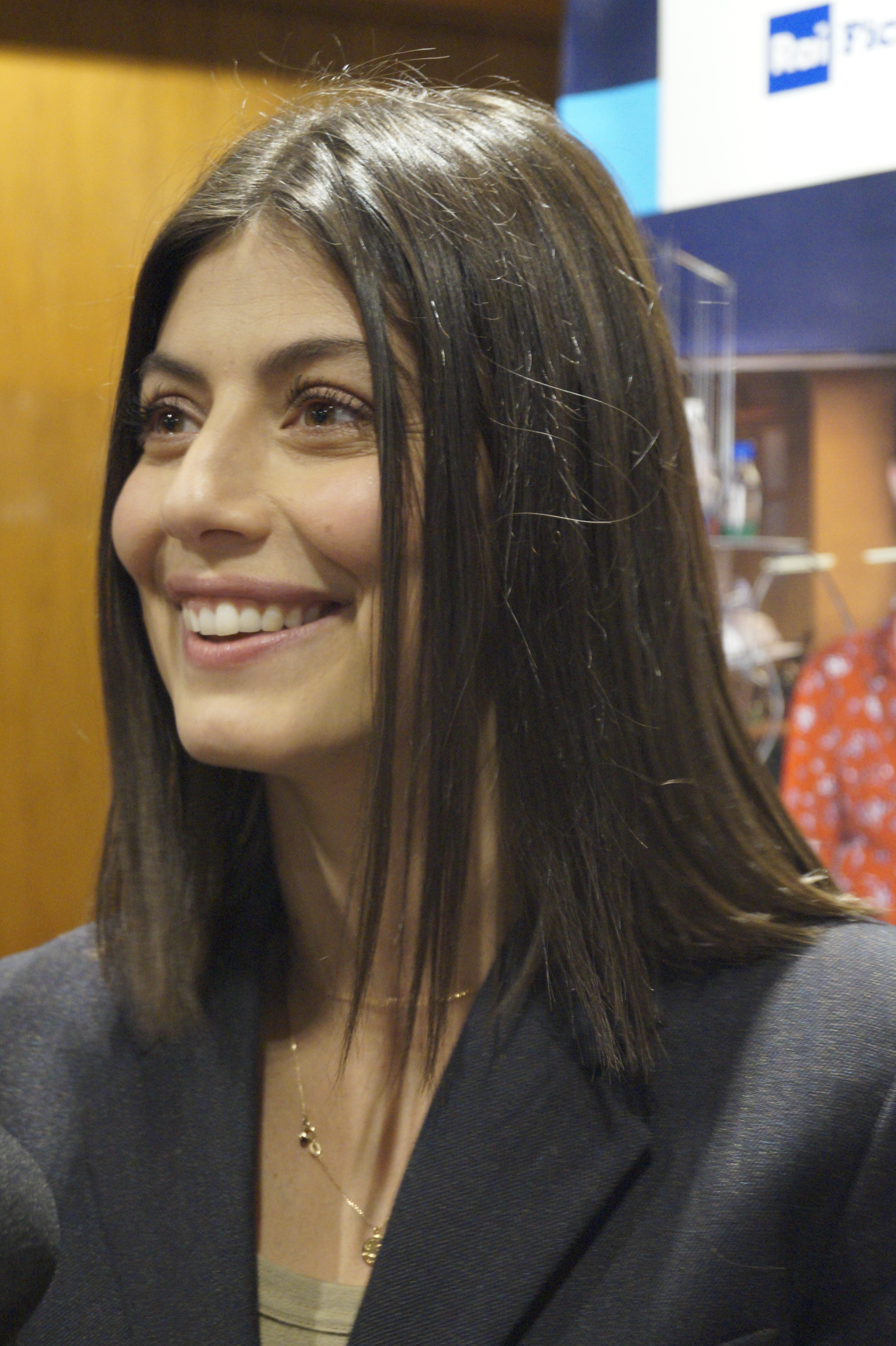
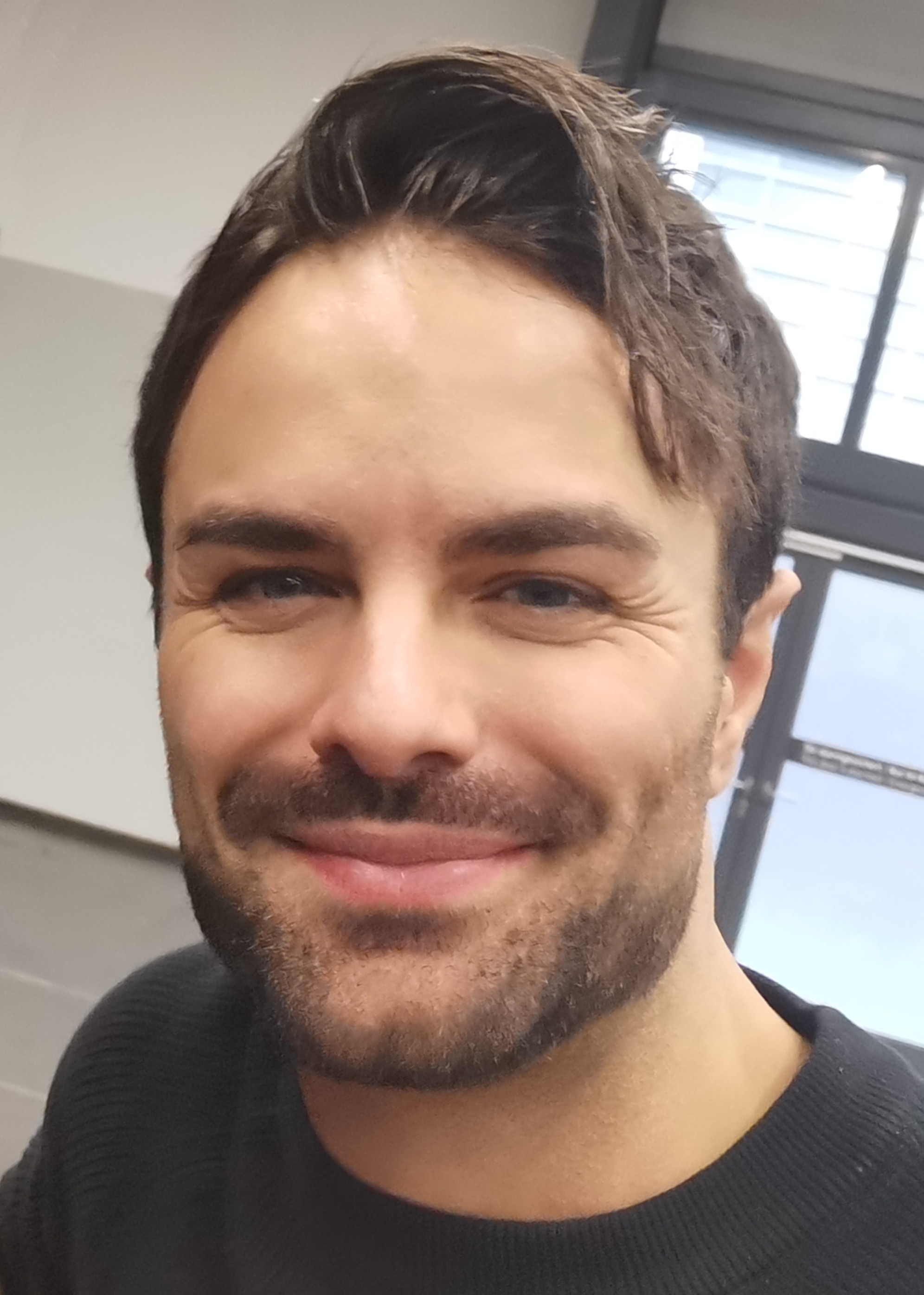
Alessandra Mastronardi (left) and Marios Gavrilis (right) played Gina Lombardi and Emmerich Voss, respectively.

Other voice actors included Alessandra Mastronardi as Gina Lombardi, Marios Gavrilis as Emmerich Voss, and Tony Todd as Locus in his final voice acting role. Todd was brought into the project after Torvenius and other developers half-jokingly pitched Todd for the role out of dissatisfaction with the actors who had auditioned for the role, as they had not brought enough depth to Locus. Once Todd turned out to be available, developers felt he brought an entirely different angle to the character's background, so he was offered the role. Gavrilis auditioned for the role under the impression the game was a new Wolfenstein entry until he was informed about its true nature in late 2021; he felt that had he been told beforehand, he would have failed his audition. To portray Voss, Gavrilis rewatched the Indiana Jones films, paying special attention to Ronald Lacey's Arnold Toht and Paul Freeman's René Belloq, and injected "a bit of Klaus Kinski flavour" to his performance. Gustafsson described Voss as a "hobby psychologist" who used Indiana's obsession with the past against him. Gavrilis described Voss as "radical and unapologetic", and remarked that he had "Joker-like qualities, almost like a God-level troll, a school bully who took shithousery to a whole different level, backing it up with true knowledge and skill". Stuntman Nicklas Hansson briefly took over for Gavrilis on set when Gavrilis was infected with COVID-19.

=== Audio ===
The audio team, led by Peter Ward, rewatched the films and recreated Ben Burtt's sound design for the game. According to Ward, the team "did hundreds of hours of original recordings, using props like the whip, the fedora, the leather jacket, and lots of different shoe types on lots of different surfaces". The soundtrack was composed by Gordy Haab, based on the work of John Williams, who composed the film scores. Haab and 86 musicians recorded the game's score at Abbey Road Studios, where Williams originally recorded Raiders of the Lost Ark (1981). Certain soundtrack pieces, such as "Marion's Theme" and "Raiders March", had to be re-recorded and re-orchestrated due to mechanical copyright. Haab chose percussion instruments he described as "very interesting", like the jawbone, to create an environment that gives a sense of space to the game.

=== Technology ===
Indiana Jones and the Great Circle was developed using MachineGames's custom fork of id Tech 7, branded as Motor. The game was built around ray tracing, requiring hardware-accelerated ray tracing on all platforms. Ray-traced global illumination (RTGI) is used for calculating indirect lighting from sources like the sun, exhibiting natural light fall-off, contact shadows and shadowed crevices. MachineGames partnered with Nvidia to implement path tracing, known as "full ray tracing", on Windows. Path tracing replaces static cube maps used on glass reflections, and ray-traced sun shadows are calculated on a per-pixel basis. All cutscenes are rendered in real time with 16:9 and cinematic 21:9 options.

Hair rendering uses a strand-based system to represent individual strands rather than the traditional hair cards technique. MachineGames chose to use hair strands due to the game's cinematic cutscenes where detailed character faces are often close to the camera; it also simplified the artists' creation workflow. Weaker devices like the Steam Deck and Xbox Series S feature less than half the maximum hair strands of other platforms. Hair strands are used for most characters; MachineGames experimented with strands for animal fur but limited them for certain animals like spiders and monkeys. Indiana Jones and the Great Circle was the first game to support RTX Hair, added in September 2025 to more accurately light hair with path tracing. RTX Hair uses Linear Swept Spheres, a new sphere primitive introduced with Nvidia's GeForce RTX 50 series graphics cards to better represent hair strand geometry; it reduces geometry needed to render hair strands and their representation in the bounding volume hierarchy compared to using triangle primitives.

To hit the performance target on consoles, MachineGames degraded RTGI quality rather than eliminate it entirely; it is lower on consoles than the lowest-quality RTGI setting on Windows. The game relies on variable rate shading on Xbox Series X/S, reducing quality in some areas of the frame to maintain performance targets. Xbox Series X renders at internal resolution of 1800p with dynamic resolution scaling to maintain 60 frames per second (FPS) with id Tech's temporal anti-aliasing solution. PlayStation 5 is similar, running at 1200p to 1800p, while the PlayStation 5 Pro operates at a higher dynamic resolution range of 1440p to 4K. The weaker Xbox Series S features graphical cutbacks, running at a 1080p resolution at 60 FPS, and a reduced file size.

MachineGames were notified late in production that a Nintendo Switch 2 version was possible. MachineGames wanted to ensure the Switch 2 had comparable visual quality to the other consoles versions without cutting content. An initial concern was that NPC crowd density would need to be reduced due to the system's low power CPU limitations, but only one specific area was impacted. Torvenius considered its visual quality equal to the Xbox Series S. MachineGames capped the frame rate at 30 FPS to maintain consistent performance at their desired visual quality. When docked, the Switch 2 version is rendered at 540p internal resolution with upscaling to 1080p using DLSS; output resolution is lowered to 720p in handheld mode. Textures and audio were compressed to fit within a Switch 2 game card instead of using a Game-Key Card, which MachineGames considered important so players would not require an online connection.

== Release ==
The game's announcement in 2021 was accompanied by a teaser trailer which included various Easter eggs and hints about the game's setting. The game's title, story details, and first gameplay footage were unveiled on January 18, 2024, during the Xbox Developer Direct video presentation.

Indiana Jones and the Great Circle was released on December 9, 2024, for Windows and Xbox Series X/S as a timed console exclusive. The original contract between Bethesda and Lucasfilm parent Disney stipulated that the game would launch as a multiplatform game, but this was amended to exclude a PlayStation 5 version when Microsoft acquired Bethesda's parent company ZeniMax Media in March 2021. Disney felt that Windows and Xbox Series X/S made up a large-enough marketplace to justify exclusivity. Despite this, a PlayStation 5 version launched on April 17, 2025. On the decision to pursue a PlayStation 5 version of the game after initially announcing it as an Xbox console exclusive, Microsoft Gaming CEO Phil Spencer cited the strong reception to prior Xbox multiplatform games Sea of Thieves, Pentiment, Grounded, and Hi-Fi Rush. He also described the necessity of providing returns to Microsoft in order to receive support on game development, and the desire to maintain strong interest in their franchises while growing the Xbox ecosystem across console, PC and cloud, calling multiplatform development "a strategy that works for us". A Nintendo Switch 2 version of the game released on May 12, 2026.

A cosmetics pack inspired by Indiana Jones and the Last Crusade (1989) was available as a general pre-order bonus or for pre-loading the game on Xbox Game Pass Ultimate or PC Game Pass. Alongside the standard release, a Premium Edition and Collector's Edition are also distributed. Both editions enabled a three-day early access period to play the game from December 6, 2024, an extra outfit for Jones inspired by his appearance in Indiana Jones and the Temple of Doom (1984), and instant access to the game's story expansion The Order of Giants from release, in addition to a Digital Art Book. The Collector's Edition also comes with a SteelBook display case, a physical replica of the Allmaker Relic displaying a download code for the digital game, a journal resembling the one belonging to Jones, and an 11-inch globe marking key locations in the game's story, with space for hidden storage.

A downloadable story expansion titled The Order of Giants was released on September 4, 2025. The expansion was intended to be a "natural extension" of the main story campaign, and explores the origin of the mysterious Nephilim Order. Commenting on the expansion, Torvenius noted that the DLC does not impact the story of the game, though it gives the player additional insights about the game's lore. The team introduced a three-tier system which dynamically adjusted the difficulty of the expansion depending on how far the player had progressed the main campaign. In October 2025, MachineGames added a New Game Plus mode to the game, as well as an additional ending scene.

== Reception ==
=== Critical reception ===
Reception

Aggregate scores
Aggregator	Score
Metacritic	PC: 87/100; XSXS: 86/100; PS5: 88/100
OpenCritic	93% recommend

Review scores
Publication	Score
Destructoid	8/10
Digital Trends	4/5
Eurogamer	5/5
Game Informer	9/10
GameSpot	9/10
GamesRadar+	5/5
IGN	9/10
PC Gamer (US)	86/100
The Guardian	4/5
Video Games Chronicle	5/5
VG247	5/5

Indiana Jones and the Great Circle received "generally favorable" reviews from critics, according to the review aggregator website Metacritic, and 93% of critics recommended the game on OpenCritic.

Critics praised the game as "immersive" and noted that the gameplay systems, such as the melee combat, puzzle systems, and first-person view accurately reflected Indiana Jones as seen in the movies. Alex Donaldson of VG247 wrote that the game successfully represented "all of Indiana Jones as a character—the adventurer, the professor, the ladies' man, the action hero". The first-person view in particular was also noted as a differentiator from other action-adventure games such as Tomb Raider and Uncharted. Side quests were commended by Jordan Middler in Video Games Chronicle for being as meaningful as the main quests. The puzzle system, and especially the hint system, were applauded, with Middler adding that they were "well-designed" with a hint system that did not shout the answer at the player. The stealth system was less roundly liked, however, as several critics found them to be "simplistic". Ash Parrish of The Verge wrote that the game "would've been better as a movie", criticizing its gameplay for being simple and boring. The level design also received acclaim, especially Vatican City. Several critics compared the level design to those found in modern Deus Ex games and Dishonored, and liked how the game rewarded players for exploring. Its more linear action sequences were also praised for being bombastic and imaginative.

Donaldson called The Great Circle one of the best licensed games in history, and Katharine Castle from Eurogamer wrote that the game had a "gripping and memorable global conspiracy plot", and that the game restored the franchise's legacy following disappointments such as Kingdom of the Crystal Skull (2008) and Dial of Destiny (2023). The cutscenes were also praised as being well-directed, with Luke Reilly of IGN writing that it conveyed the "slightly slapstick Indiana Jones humour" and remarking that the game "may well be the best Indiana Jones movie". The game's presentation and tone were also praised as fitting well with the rest of the franchise. Some criticized the pacing, particularly the extended early stay in Vatican City, for interrupting the flow of the story. Rick Lane's review in The Guardian praised the story's political message and relevance, writing that it "acutely dissects far-right ideology as a whole, and actively explores how aspiring autocrats build their power on the bodies of disaffected young men". Critics widely praised Baker and the supporting cast's performances. Harrison Ford called Baker's performance as "brilliant", and used the game to voice his support for video game performers on strike in 2025, protesting the use of artificial intelligence to duplicate their work.

==== The Order of Giants ====
The expansion The Order of Giants received "mixed or average" reviews on Metacritic. While most critics agreed it retained the base game's gameplay strengths and featured inventive puzzles, some were disappointed that it did not introduce any new features, and that its side-adventure status and smaller scale rendered it an inessential experience.

=== Sales ===
Indiana Jones and the Great Circle was the second best-selling game in the United States during its launch week. Satya Nadella, Microsoft's CEO, said that 4 million players had played the game by January 2025. Indiana Jones and the Great Circle became the best-selling PlayStation 5 game during its release week for that console.

=== Awards ===
Indiana Jones and the Great Circle appeared on several lists of the top video games of 2024, being ranked in sixth place by GamingBolt, eighth place by the Associated Press, and tenth place by The Guardian. It was also selected by Eurogamer as its Game of the Year.

Year	Award	Category	Result	Ref.
2025	New York Game Awards 2024	Big Apple Award for Best Game of the Year	Nominated	
2025	New York Game Awards 2024	Herman Melville Award for Best Writing in a Game	Nominated	
2025	New York Game Awards 2024	Statue of Liberty Award for Best World	Nominated	
2025	New York Game Awards 2024	Great White Way Award for Best Acting in a Game (Troy Baker)	Won	
2025	28th Annual D.I.C.E. Awards	Game of the Year	Nominated	
2025	28th Annual D.I.C.E. Awards	Adventure Game of the Year	Won	
2025	28th Annual D.I.C.E. Awards	Outstanding Achievement in Art Direction	Nominated	
2025	28th Annual D.I.C.E. Awards	Outstanding Achievement in Character (Indiana Jones)	Won	
2025	28th Annual D.I.C.E. Awards	Outstanding Achievement in Story	Won	
2025	28th Annual D.I.C.E. Awards	Outstanding Technical Achievement	Nominated	
2025	NAVGTR Awards 2024	Art Direction, Period Influence	Won	
2025	NAVGTR Awards 2024	Gameplay Design, Franchise	Won	
2025	NAVGTR Awards 2024	Game, Franchise Adventure	Won	
2025	NAVGTR Awards 2024	Original Dramatic Score, Franchise	Won	
2025	NAVGTR Awards 2024	Performance in a Drama, Lead (Troy Baker)	Won	
2025	NAVGTR Awards 2024	Performance in a Drama, Supporting (Alessandra Mastronardi)	Won	
2025	NAVGTR Awards 2024	Performance in a Drama, Supporting (Marios Gavrilis)	Nominated	
2025	ASCAP Award	Video Game Score of the Year	Nominated	
2025	International Film Music Critics Association Award	Best Original Score for a Video Game or Interactive Media	Won	
2025	17th Nordic Game Awards	Nordic Game of the Year	Won	
2025	17th Nordic Game Awards	Best Audio	Won	
2025	Golden Joystick Awards	Ultimate Game of the Year	Nominated	
2025	Golden Joystick Awards	Best Lead Performer (Troy Baker)	Nominated	
2025	Golden Joystick Awards	Best Supporting Performer (Marios Gavrilis)	Nominated	
2025	Golden Joystick Awards	Best Game Expansion (The Order of Giants)	Nominated	
2025	16th Hollywood Music in Media Awards	Score – Video Game (Console & PC)	Nominated	
2025	The Game Awards 2025	Best Action/Adventure Game	Nominated	
2025	The Game Awards 2025	Best Performance (Troy Baker)	Nominated	
2026	68th Annual Grammy Awards	Best Score Soundtrack for Video Games and Other Interactive Media	Nominated	
2026	24th Game Audio Network Guild Awards	Sound Design of the Year	Nominated	
2026	24th Game Audio Network Guild Awards	Best Audio Mix	Nominated	
2026	24th Game Audio Network Guild Awards	Best Cinematic & Cutscene Audio	Nominated	
2026	24th Game Audio Network Guild Awards	Best Ensemble Cast Performance	Nominated	
2026	24th Game Audio Network Guild Awards	Best Game Foley	Nominated	
2026	24th Game Audio Network Guild Awards	Best Voice Performance (Troy Baker)	Won	
2026	24th Game Audio Network Guild Awards	Dialogue of the Year	Won	
2026	24th Game Audio Network Guild Awards	Music of the Year	Nominated	
2026	24th Game Audio Network Guild Awards	Audio of the Year	Nominated	
2026	22nd British Academy Games Awards	Best Game	Nominated	
2026	22nd British Academy Games Awards	Animation	Longlisted	
2026	22nd British Academy Games Awards	Artistic Achievement	Longlisted	
2026	22nd British Academy Games Awards	Audio Achievement	Nominated	
2026	22nd British Academy Games Awards	Game Design	Longlisted	
2026	22nd British Academy Games Awards	Music	Nominated	
2026	22nd British Academy Games Awards	Narrative	Nominated	
2026	22nd British Academy Games Awards	Performer in a Leading Role (Troy Baker)	Nominated	
2026	22nd British Academy Games Awards	Technical Achievement	Nominated	
2026	7th Society of Composers & Lyricists Awards	Outstanding Original Score for Interactive Media	Nominated	

== Possible sequels ==
When asked about the possibility of follow-ups to Indiana Jones and the Great Circle, Lucasfilm Games vice president and general manager Douglas Reilly stated that while they were focusing on making the game and its DLC successes, "I think we're always looking for great stories. And the good news is, there's a lot of space in between the films where we could tell more and more Indiana Jones stories that I think would be super interesting".
