= Honeyglue =

- Directed by: James Bird
- Written by: James Bird
- Produced by: Anya Remizova; Adriana Mather; James Bird
- Starring: Adriana Mather; Zach Villa; Christopher Heyerdahl; Jessica Tuck; Booboo Stewart; Amanda Plummer; Fernanda Romero; Kristin Minter; Clayton Rohner
- Cinematography: Stefan Colson
- Edited by: Stefan Colson
- Music by: Anya Remizova
- Production company: Zombot Pictures
- Release dates: April 26, 2015 (Newport Beach); June 3, 2016
- Running time: 107 minutes
- Country: United States
- Language: English

Honeyglue is an American romantic drama film written and directed by James Bird, produced by Zombot Pictures. The film stars Adriana Mather, Zach Villa, Christopher Heyerdahl, Jessica Tuck, Booboo Stewart, and Amanda Plummer. The film premiered at Newport Beach Film Festival and was released theatrically in the United States on June 3, 2016.

== Premise ==
Honeyglue tells the story of Morgan, who turns her sheltered middle-class life upside down after learning she has only three months left to live. While fulfilling her "bucket list" she visits a gothic nightclub where she meets Jordan, a rebellious gender-nonconforming artist. Morgan falls in love with Jordan and together they embark on a series of adventures, which she documents with a handheld camera.

== Cast ==
- Adriana Mather as Morgan
- Zach Villa as Jordan
- Christopher Heyerdahl as Dennis
- Jessica Tuck as Janet
- Booboo Stewart as Bailey
- Amanda Plummer as Alice
- Fernanda Romero as Misty
- Kristin Minter as Aunt Lisa
- Clayton Rohner as Dr Colson
- Faran Tahir as Dr Konig

== Production ==
The events of Honeyglue are inspired by one of the producers (Anya Remizova) losing her father to cancer while filming Zombot Pictures's first film, Eat Spirit Eat. James Bird began doing research and writing the script for Honeyglue shortly after, as a way of dealing with the loss.

One of the major themes in the film is gender identity and sexuality, with the character of Jordan being gender fluid. Early in production a choice was made to not discuss gender in the film and not dwell on the issue. In an interview with DailyCal, Adriana Mather, who also produced the film, explained, “We do that on purpose because these are just people, and gender is on a spectrum.”

Filming commenced on February 2, 2014. Honeyglue was filmed in 20 days in various locations around Los Angeles, California, including El Matador State Beach, Downtown Los Angeles Arts District, and Glendale. The gothic club in the scene where Morgan and Jordan first meet is not a real venue and was built specifically for the production, inside an industrial warehouse in DTLA.

== Soundtrack ==
The soundtrack includes an original score by Anya Remizova and additional songs performed by The Grass Roots, Josh Ritter, IAMX, Las Cafeterias, Portugal. The Man, Watson Twins, and 'Mericans . A Cloud Cult song, "You're The Only Thing In Your Way", is featured both in the film and in its official trailer.

Remizova's score features extensive use of vintage analog synthesizers and a live piano.

== Release ==
The film was released theatrically in a limited run on June 3, 2016 and digitally on June 14, 2016 by Zombot Pictures.

== Reception ==
On Rotten Tomatoes the film has an approval rating of 36% based on reviews from 11 critics.

Both leading actors received praise from critics for their acting performances. Katie Walsh of the Los Angeles Times noted that "Adriana Mather gives an embodied performance as the dying young woman" and Zach Villa "brings soulful intelligence to the role of Jordan." Sherilyn Connely of SF Weekly wrote, "Jordan and Morgan emerge as fully formed characters who could have just been symbols." Some film critics criticized Honeyglue for being overly sentimental.

Honeyglue was well received and won awards during its festival run, including accolades from Napa Valley Film Festival, Big Island Film Festival, San Luis Obispo Film Festival, and Orlando Film Fest.
