= Justin Cornwell =

American actor (b. 1988)

- Born: Justin Michael Cornwell; November 5, 1988 (age 37); Sharon, Pennsylvania, U.S.
- Education: University of Louisville
- Occupations: Actor, writer, musician
- Years active: 2011–present

Justin Michael Cornwell (born November 5, 1988) is an American actor, writer and musician best known for playing Young Jeronicus Jangle in the Netflix original movie Jingle Jangle, Marcus Hargreeves in The Umbrella Academy, LaMarcus Alton in Bel-Air and Kyle Craig in the CBS crime drama, Training Day, based on the 2001 film of the same name.

== Early life and education ==
Cornwell was born in Sharon, Pennsylvania to Sidney Cornwell and Robin Bodiford. However, he was primarily raised in Cleveland, Ohio and Louisville, Kentucky. At age 10, he relocated with his mother and stepfather Jackie Herring (died 2009) to Louisville where he was encouraged to pursue art after first showing an interest in grade school. He graduated from Eastern High School where he participated in chorus and school plays. He was named as a premier student artist at the Muhammad Ali Center. He attended the University of Louisville where he continued studying acting. Cornwell relocated to Chicago in 2011 to pursue his acting career.

== Career ==
Cornwell found work at the Chicago Shakespeare Theatre where he appeared in Othello the Remix, A Midsummer Night's Dream and other Chicago theatre productions shortly after signing with his first agent. While constantly working in theater and on the crew of TV shows, he booked appearances in commercials for Walmart and the Ohio Lottery. In 2014, Cornwell appeared in an episode of the NBC crime drama, Chicago P.D. In 2015, he appeared in an episode of Fox's musical drama, Empire and later had an uncredited appearance in Spike Lee's Chi-Raq. In March 2016, Cornwell was cast in the pilot for the CBS drama Training Day, based on the 2001 film of the same name. It went to series but was cancelled after the untimely death of Cornwell's co-lead Bill Paxton, airing all 13 episodes of its sole season. In 2017, Cornwell was cast in the TNT limited series I Am the Night, produced by Patty Jenkins and Chris Pine, which aired its limited run in January 2019. That same year also saw Cornwell star in the NBC supernatural crime drama, The InBetween, which ended its run after only one season. In the fall of 2020, Cornwell appeared in the event musical Jingle Jangle for Netflix as young Jeronicus Jangle performing the opening song This Day in the film. In January 2021, it was announced that Cornwell would be joining the season 3 of Netflix series The Umbrella Academy as the leader of an alternate group of super powered siblings called the Sparrow Academy. As of June 2021, Cornwell was announced as a lead in Gareth Evans Netflix action thriller Havoc starring alongside Tom Hardy and Forest Whitaker. in 2023-24 Cornwell appeared in season 2 and 3 of Bel-Air as Lamarcus Alton.

== Filmography ==
=== Movies ===
Year	Title	Role	Notes
2018	We Are Boats	Freddie	
2020	Jingle Jangle: A Christmas Journey	Young Jeronicus	
2024	The Million Dollar Bet	Jack	
2025	Havoc	Charlie Beaumont	

=== Television ===
Year	Title	Role	Notes
2014	Chicago P.D.	James Grant	Episode: "Prison Ball"
2015	Empire	Songwriter	Episode: "The Devil Quotes Scripture"
2017	Training Day	Kyle Craig	Lead
2019	I Am the Night	Terrence Shye	Limited series
2019	The InBetween	Damien Asante	Lead
2022	The Umbrella Academy	Marcus Hargreeves / Sparrow Number One	Recurring role (season 3)
2023–2024	Bel-Air	Lamarcus Alton	Recurring role (season 2 and season 3)
2025	The Rookie	A.J Knox	Guest Star (season 7)
2025–present	Matlock	Remy Hodges	Recurring Role (season 2)

=== Video games ===
Year	Title	Role	Notes
2014	Watch Dogs	Viceroys	Additional voices
