= Chasing Shakespeare =

- Directed by: Norry Niven
- Written by: James Bird
- Produced by: Norry Niven; Loren Basulto; Anya Remizova; Chelsea Nollner; James Bird; Rich Moses
- Starring: Danny Glover; Ashley Bell; Graham Greene; Chelsea Ricketts
- Cinematography: Norry Niven
- Music by: Eric Kaye
- Production company: Eleven-55 Films
- Distributed by: Vertical Entertainment
- Release date: March 2013
- Running time: 116 minutes
- Country: United States
- Language: English

Chasing Shakespeare is a 2013 film directed by Norry Niven, and starring Danny Glover, Ashley Bell, and Graham Greene.

== Cast ==
- Danny Glover as William Ward
  - Mike Wade as young William
- Ashley Bell as Molly
- Graham Greene as Mr. Mountain
- Chelsea Ricketts as Venus
  - Tantoo Cardinal as older Venus
- Clarence Gilyard Jr as Jeremiah Ward
- Adriana Mather as Betty
- Clayton Rohner as Mr. Shelton
- Darryl Cox as Doctor

== Release ==
The film premiered at the Dallas International Film Festival Festival in April 2013, and was opening night film at the Breckenridge Film Festival, The Montreal Black Film Festival, The 38th annual Native American Film Festival in San Francisco on November 1, 2013, The African Diaspora Film Festival NY and The Orlando Film Festival. It has been nominated 36 times in as many festivals, winning 27 awards including Best Feature Film at The FirstGlance Film Festival, Best of Fest at The Big Island Film Festival, Best Feature Film at the AFI Cannes Film Festival, Audience Choice, Best Opening Title Sequence at SXSW, Best Dram/Romance at The WorldFest Houston Film Festival, Best Feature Film at the World Peace Initiative The Hampton's Film Festival and Best Director at Red Nations Film Festival and The Orlando Film Festival. The film was written by James Bird.
