= Deutsche Synchronkartei =

Online database of voice actors

- Website type: Online database for voice actors in Film and television productions
- Available in: German
- Creators: Martin Schowanek (Content); Christopher Beppler (Technology)
- Website: https://www.synchronkartei.de/
- Registration: No
- Launched: 28 February 1997; 29 years ago
- Current status: Active

The Deutsche Synchronkartei is an online database of voice actors in film and television productions. It is listed as a scientific and freely accessible source of information in the Datenbank-Infosystem.

In April 2021, according to the voice actor podcast stimmt!, the Deutsche Synchronkartei included "(...) over 172,000 actors, over 11,000 speakers, over 40,000 films, almost 7,000 series, almost 400,000 film roles, with 75 new film roles and 100 new series roles per day added".

== Content ==
The Deutsche Synchronkartei is an ad-supported online database in which (international) actors and their German-speaking voice actors are listed, and – if known – the responsible dubbing company, the responsible dialogue director and the dialogue book author are named. The database allows users to search for series, movies, actors and voice actors. Each user can enter new data or correct incorrect entries without prior registration. These entries are largely checked by the team before activation. However, there is no indication of the sources and thus the correctness of the data. At the beginning of 2022, the database had over 800,000 entries and was visited by an average of about 45,000 users per day (as of 26 January 2022).

Voice actor agencies are linked on the site. According to developer Martin Schowanek, "This happened mainly because we have repeatedly received booking requests for voice actors, which we could not fulfill in the past, since we are not an agency ourselves. With the proceeds we finance our running costs such as server rental. Otherwise, we are still a nonprofit project."

== History ==
Originally, the database was a collection of static HTML files. According to developer Christopher Beppler, this version existed until 31 December 2005. On this day, the new version of Deutsche Synchronkartei was launched.

On 30 April 2006, Beppler completed the input wizard. This allows visitors to add entries independently to Deutsche Synchronkartei.

Previously, the information in the database came from various sources: "The sources are primarily my [Schowanek's] ears, but of course also the numerous e-mails, as well as the few films in which the speakers are mentioned in the credits. In addition, there are newspaper articles, radio play cassettes and TV appearances of speakers (yes, that really happened once...)" as well as information provided by members of the Synchron-forum, in which Schowanek is also a very active member and regularly gives information about his database.

Many of the entries now come from the voice actors themselves, who send their daily call sheets to the operators. According to Schowanek, this is "very valuable for us, as this is how we often get information about smaller roles that might otherwise have been lost. There are also many people interested in dubbing who visit our site frequently and, for example, point out errors. It can be said that collective intelligence works."

According to Beppler, "Many voice actors maintain their own entries using the wizard. But studios also send us entire lists."

The last major technical change was the release of version 2.1 of the Input Wizard on 9 February 2008. According to Beppler, this now uses "one or the other AJAX functionality, so that the long loading of the drop-down menus is no longer necessary".

Furthermore, there is a mobile app that allows users to search the database on an Android smartphone.

== Reception ==
The Deutsche Synchronkartei is, alongside Arne Kaul's fee-based dubbing database, the most comprehensive database of its kind in the German-speaking world. Numerous entertainment websites, such as Moviepilot and IGN, as well as anime news portals, refer to them. For example, the platform moviejones.de reported that Synchronkartei was the first to report the death of German voice actor Arne Elsholtz.

The portal Moviepilot referred in its report on the death of German voice actor Bernd Rumpf to "A comprehensive overview" on Deutsche Synchronkartei of Rumpf's work as a voice actor.

== Statistics ==
According to Alexa, the website Deutsche Synchronkartei ranked among the 600,000 most popular websites on the Internet in January 2022.
