= Graham Greene (actor) =

First Nations actor (1952–2025)

Graham Greene CM
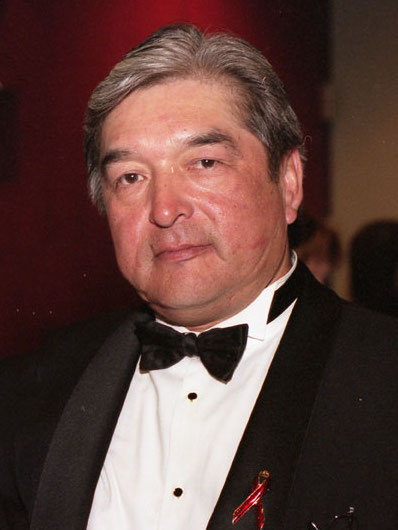
- Greene in 1998
- Born: June 22, 1952; Six Nations Reserve, Ohsweken, Ontario, Canada
- Died: September 1, 2025 (aged 73); Stratford, Ontario, Canada
- Occupations: Actor; recording artist
- Years active: 1976–2025
- Spouse: Hilary Blackmore (m. 1990)
- Children: 1
- Relatives: Gary Farmer (second cousin once removed)

Graham Greene (June 22, 1952 – September 1, 2025) was a Canadian First Nations (Oneida) actor and recording artist, active in film, television and theatre in a career spanning over 50 years. He achieved international fame for his role as Kicking Bird (Ziŋtká Nagwáka) in Kevin Costner's Dances With Wolves (1990), which earned him an Academy Award nomination for Best Supporting Actor. His other notable films include Thunderheart (1992), Maverick (1994), Die Hard with a Vengeance (1995), The Green Mile (1999), Skins (2002), Transamerica (2005), Casino Jack (2010), Winter's Tale (2014), The Shack (2017), and Wind River (2017).

In addition to his Oscar nomination, Greene was a Grammy Award, Gemini Award, Canadian Screen Award, and a Dora Mavor Moore Award winner. In 2025, he received the Governor General's Performing Arts Award.

== Early life and early career ==
Greene was an Oneida born on June 22, 1952, in Ohsweken, Ontario, on the Six Nations of the Grand River First Nations reserve, the son of John, a paramedic and maintenance man, and Lillian Greene. He lived in Hamilton, Ontario, as a young man. He was a second cousin once removed of fellow actor Gary Farmer. Before moving into acting, Greene worked as a draftsman, civil technologist, steelworker, and rock-band crew member.

He worked as an audio technician for Toronto rock bands and in a recording studio in Ancaster, Ontario. He later related that musician Kelly Jay repeatedly encouraged him to try out for a play.

David Godkin, in a 2012 interview of Greene, stated that contrary to other reports, Greene did not attend the Toronto-based Centre for Indigenous Theatre's Native Theatre School program, but rather "helped run it, as executive director of a school-supporting local arts organization." The New York Times obituary for Greene, however, states that he graduated from the Centre in 1974. By the 1970s, he began performing in professional theatre in Toronto and England and in 1976 he participated in the University of Western Ontario's touring workshop performance of James Reaney's Wacousta.

His television debut was in an episode of The Great Detective in 1979, and his film debut was in 1983 in Running Brave. On viewing his first television role, Greene stated that it was "awful", and that it prompted him to start learning to act as a profession.

== Career ==
=== Theatre ===
Greene frequently worked at the Native Earth Performing Arts, and was well known for his performance in Dry Lips Oughta Move to Kapuskasing as the affable drunk Pierre St. Pierre. He also performed in The Crackwalker and History of the Village of the Small Huts.

At the 2007 Stratford Festival, he portrayed Shylock in The Merchant of Venice and Lennie in Of Mice and Men.

=== Television ===
Greene's television career began with a role in the CBC series Spirit Bay (1984, 1986), where he played Pete "Baba" Green. The show was among the first to depict Indigenous life and cultural interactions.

Throughout the 1990s, Greene was a frequent guest star. He portrayed the shaman Leonard Quinhagak on Northern Exposure, a character whose traditional practices often conflicted with modern medicine. He also took on the role of the explosives-loving Edgar "K.B." Montrose on The Red Green Show, a character he would revisit periodically until 2006. His other notable roles from this era include playing Ishi in the HBO film The Last of His Tribe (1992) and the beloved Mr. Crabby Tree in the children's series The Adventures of Dudley the Dragon (1994). He also made a guest appearance on the sketch comedy show Royal Canadian Air Farce in 1994.

From 1997 to 2001, Greene hosted the forensic science documentary series Exhibit A: Secrets of Forensic Science. He later starred in the short-lived series Wolf Lake (2001) and co-starred in two TV movies attempting to revive The Beachcombers (2002, 2004).

In the 2000s and 2010s, Greene continued to take on diverse guest roles. He presented the documentary The War that Made America (2006), appeared on shows like Numb3rs, and had a recurring role as Dr. Arthur on Being Erica (2010–2011). A notable comedic turn saw him parody pain reliever commercials on Rick Mercer Report. From 2012 to 2017, he played the villainous Malachi Strand on Longmire.

More recently, Greene appeared as Spotted Eagle in the 1883 series (2022). He joined the Marvel Cinematic Universe in the miniseries Echo (2024). In 2023, he guest-starred in critically acclaimed series such as Reservation Dogs and The Last of Us. He most recently guest-starred in two 2025 episodes of The Lowdown as "Arthur".

=== Movies ===
Greene's Academy Award–nominated role as Kicking Bird (Lakota: Ziŋtká Nagwáka) in the 1990 film Dances With Wolves showcased his talents to audiences beyond his native Canada. In an interview with CineMovie, Greene recounts a story of being tossed from a horse during production. When director Costner asked if he wanted a break, the actor retorted that he was more interested in finding the horse for payback. He stated that it was difficult for him to learn how to speak the Lakota language properly. Having not grown up speaking a native language, he said "... I couldn't figure out how they ordered their language. Its structure is totally foreign to English or French."

He appeared in the contemporary action-mystery film, Thunderheart (1992), playing Walter Crow Horse, a gruff, savvy local cop living on an Indian reservation. He was quick to sign up for the movie, saying, "I love the Badlands. My agent said, 'I got a film for you. It's in South Dakota. And you have to ride a motorcycle.' I said, 'I'm in.' 'Want to read it?' 'Don't have to.'"

In 1994's Maverick, Greene elicited good reviews as the sidekick to Mel Gibson. At a screening of the movie the Los Angeles Times noted that Greene, "[as a] thoroughly modern Native American who exploits his position as a tourist attraction for Russian adventurers", got the most laughs.

Greene also acted alongside Bruce Willis and Samuel L. Jackson in the 1995 film Die Hard with a Vengeance, where he played Detective Joe Lambert.

Greene was featured as Arlen Bitterbuck who was convicted of murder, awaiting execution on death row in the Oscar-nominated The Green Mile (1999). The character was an elder of the Washita Tribe, and a member of a Cherokee Council, his nickname was "The Chief". The character's execution is the first witnessed in the movie, and is depicted from start to finish and is noted as being a fairly accurate portrayal of the procedure.

Greene co-starred as Slick Nakai with Adam Beach and Wes Studi in the films A Thief of Time (2004) and Coyote Waits (2003), both adapted from Tony Hillerman novels of the same names and produced by Robert Redford.

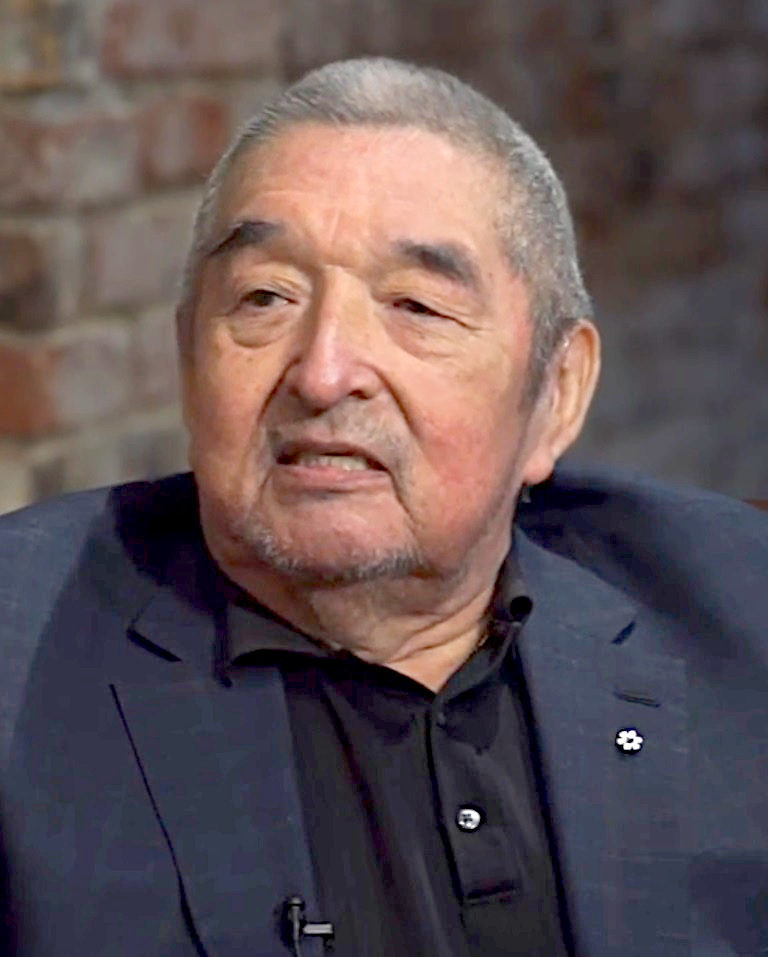
Greene in a CTM interview in 2022

In 2005, he played the potential love interest of the female lead in Transamerica. A review of the movie praises Greene's performance as having "charming earthiness" but also notes that his character is allowed to find the transgender character attractive as "he's allowed to be open-minded because he's a Navajo – in other words, a spiritually open-minded outsider, as opposed to your typical Middle American."

Greene worked with Aaron Sorkin on Molly's Game in 2017. In his role as a judge, the actor recalled "Aaron [Sorkin], the director, was looking at me sitting behind the bench. I had a puzzled look on my face. He said, 'Are you all right?' I said, 'Yeah. I've just never seen the bench from this side before.'"

=== Other work ===
Greene provided the pre-recorded narration for Tecumseh!, the highly acclaimed outdoor show held in Ohio, based upon the life of the illustrious Shawnee chief of the same name. He portrayed Sitting Bull in a short Historica vignette.

In 2018, Greene acted as the beleaguered Native-American elder Chief Rains Fall in the western-themed video game Red Dead Redemption 2.

== Personal life ==
Greene and his wife Hilary Blackmore lived outside of Toronto with a "small army of cats". He had one daughter with actress Carol Lazare. He enjoyed writing, building boats, and playing golf, and noted: "I just want to go and play, I don't care who's looking. It's a game where you get to play against yourself." He stated that he had no interest in migrating south to California for roles. "There's no reason to live there. A working actor can live anywhere as long as you have a phone, a fax, and know where the airport is." Regarding his time playing Mr. Crabby Tree (and the follow-up role in the pre-teen show Eric's World) he noted "I spent a year paying penance doing kids' shows."

When discussing Native people in film, Greene noted that he would like to see depictions of his people as more than stoic, saying "My people are very funny."

In June 2008, he was awarded an honorary doctor of law degree from the Brantford campus of Wilfrid Laurier University.

He was appointed a Member of the Order of Canada (CM) in the 2015 Canadian honours.

=== Death ===
Greene died in Stratford, Ontario, on September 1, 2025, after a long illness, at the age of 73.

== Filmography ==
=== Film ===
Year	Title	Role	Notes
1983	Running Brave	Eddie Mills	
1985	Revolution	Ongwata	
1989	Powwow Highway	Vietnam veteran	
1990	Dances with Wolves	Kicking Bird	
1991	Clearcut	Arthur	
1992	Thunderheart	Walter Crow Horse	
1992	Rain Without Thunder	Author on history	
1993	Benefit of the Doubt	Sheriff Calhoun	
1994	Camilla	Hunt Weller	
1994	Savage Land	Skyano	
1994	Maverick	Chief Joseph	
1994	North	Alaskan father	
1994	Rugged Gold	Samuel Smith	
1995	Die Hard with a Vengeance	Detective Joe Lambert	
1996	Sabotage	Tollander	
1997	Wounded	Nick Rollins	
1997	The Education of Little Tree	Willow John	
1998	Shattered Image	Detective and store owner (two roles)	
1999	Grey Owl	Jim Bernard	
1999	The Green Mile	Arlen Bitterbuck	
1999	Misery Harbour	Burly	
2000	Desire	Detective Connor	
2001	Lost and Delirious	Joe Menzies	
2001	Christmas in the Clouds	Earl	
2002	Duct Tape Forever	Edgar K.B. Montrose	
2002	Snow Dogs	Peter Yellowbear	
2002	Skins	Mogie Yellow Lodge	
2004	Phil the Alien	Wolf	
2005	Transamerica	Calvin	
2005	Spirit Bear: The Simon Jackson Story	Lloyd Blackburn	Canadian TV movie
2007	All Hat	Jim Burns	
2007	Just Buried	Henry Sanipass	
2007	Breakfast with Scot	Bud Wilson	
2008	Turok: Son of Stone	Lost Land Shaman / Elder #1	Voice role
2009	The Twilight Saga: New Moon	Harry Clearwater	
2010	Casino Jack	Bernie Sprague	
2010	Gunless	Two Dogs (N'Kwala)	
2013	Chasing Shakespeare	Mountain	
2013	Atlantic Rim	Admiral Hadley	Direct to video
2013	Maïna	Mishte-Napeu	
2014	Winter's Tale	Humpstone John	
2014	Corner Gas: The Movie	Fisherman	
2017	Wind River	Tribal police chief Ben Shoyo	
2017	The Shack	Male Papa	
2017	Molly's Game	Judge Dustin Foxman	
2018	Through Black Spruce	Leo	
2019	Astronaut	Len	
2020	A Dark Foe	The Cradle	
2021	Antlers	Warren Stokes	
2021	Defining Moments	Dr. Kelly	
2021	The Wolf and the Lion	Joe	
2023	Squealer	Joe	
2024	Seeds		
2024	The Birds Who Fear Death	Chief Ed	
2024	The Great Salish Heist	Chief Roy	
2024	King Ivory	Holt Lightfeather	
2025	Sweet Summer Pow Wow	M.C.	
2025	The Protector	Brand	
2025	Trail of Vengeance	Hoko	
2025	Protectors of the Land	Grant Strongbow	
2025	Paige Darcy: Reluctant Detective	Mayor	
2025	Icefall	Oz	Posthumous release
TBA	Northbound		Completed, posthumous release

=== Television ===
Year	Title	Role	Notes
1981	Read All About It!	John Norton	1 episode in
1986	Spirit Bay	Pete ("Baba")	1 episode in
1986–1988	The Campbells	Iroquois man	3 episodes
1987	Captain Power and the Soldiers of the Future	Cherokee	1 episode
1987	Street Legal	Paulo	1 episode
1988	9B	Dan Jackson	Miniseries, 5 episodes
1989	Where the Spirit Lives	Komi's father	Television film
1990	Lost in the Barrens	Mawasin	Television film
1991	L.A. Law	David Wauneka	1 episode
1992; 1994	Murder, She Wrote	Sheriff Sam Keeyani / Peter Henderson	2 episodes
1992	The Last of His Tribe	Ishi	Television film
1992–1993	Northern Exposure	Leonard Quinhagak	Recurring role, 5 episodes
1993	Cooperstown	Raymond Maracle	Television film
1993	North of 60	Rico Nez	1 episode
1993	The Broken Chain	Peace Maker (Spirit)	Television film
1994–1997	The Adventures of Dudley the Dragon	Mr. Crabby Tree	Recurring role, 17 episodes
1994–2006	The Red Green Show	Edgar K.B. Montrose	Recurring role, 27 episodes
1994	Lonesome Dove: The Series	Red Hawk	3 episodes
1995	Happily Ever After: Fairy Tales for Every Child	Brown Bear	Voice role, 1 episode
1995	Liberty Street	Mr. Jones	1 episode
1996	The Outer Limits	Chief Weapons Officer	1 episode
1996	The Pathfinder	Chingachgook	Television film
1997–2001	Exhibit A: Secrets of Forensic Science	Host	Main role, 65 episodes
2000	Big Wolf on Campus	Ferryman	1 episode
2000–2001	Cover Me	Michael Nighthorse	4 episodes
2001–2002	Wolf Lake	Sherman Blackstone	Main role, 9 episodes
2002	The New Beachcombers	Colin Reid	Television film
2003	Mister Sterling	Senior Senator Jackson	1 episode
2003	Shattered City: The Halifax Explosion	Elijah Cobb	Miniseries, 2 episodes
2005	The Collector	George	1 episode
2005	Spirit Bear: The Simon Jackson Story	Lloyd Blackburn	Television film
2005	Into the West	Conquering Bear	Miniseries, 1 episode
2005	Numb3rs	Chief James Clearwater	1 episode
2005	Buffalo Dreams	John Blackhorse	Television film
2006	This is Wonderland	Paul Hilliard	1 episode
2010–2011	Being Erica	Dr. Arthur	Recurring role, 5 episodes
2013	Family Tree	Chief Running Bull	1 episode
2013–2015	Defiance	Rafe McCawley	Main role, 28 episodes
2014–2017	Longmire	Malachi Strand	Recurring role, 12 episodes
2018	Riverdale	Thomas Topaz	1 episode
2018	The Detour	Narvin	3 episodes
2019	Project Blue Book	David	1 episode
2019	Goliath	Littlecrow	Recurring role, 7 episodes
2020	Blue Ridge	Cliff McGrath	Television film
2021	American Gods	Whiskey Jack	2 episodes
2022	1883	Spotted Eagle	Miniseries, 1 episode
2023	The Last of Us	Marlon	Episode: "Kin"
2023	Reservation Dogs	Maximus	3 episodes
2024	Echo	Skully	Main role, miniseries
2024	Tulsa King	Old Smoke	Episode: "Triad" S2E9
2025	The Lowdown	Arthur Williams	2 episodes

=== Video games ===
Year	Title	Role	Notes
2018	Red Dead Redemption 2	Rains Fall	Voice and motion capture

== Awards and nominations ==
Years	Award	Category	Production	Result	Ref.
1989	Dora Mavor Moore	Outstanding Performance by a Male in a Leading Role	Dry Lips Oughta Move to Kapuskasing.	Won	
1991	Academy Awards	Best Supporting Actor	Dances with Wolves	Nominated	
1994	Gemini Awards	Best Performance in a Children's or Youth Program or Series	The Adventures of Dudley the Dragon	Won	
1994	Gemini Awards	Best Guest Performance in a Series by an Actor or Actress	North of 60	Nominated	
1997	Indspire Awards	National Aboriginal Achievement Award		Won	
2000	Grammy Awards	Best Spoken Word Album for Children	Listen to the Storyteller	Won	
2004	Gemini Awards	Earle Grey Award	Lifetime Achievement	Won	
2006	Reelworld Film Festival	Award of Excellence	Lifetime Achievement	Won	
2016	RNCI Red Nation Awards	Outstanding Supporting Actor	Longmire	Nominated	
2025	Governor General's Performing Arts Award			Won	
2025	Canadian Screen Awards	Best Supporting Performance in a Comedy Film	Seeds	Won	

== See also ==
- Notable Indigenous people of Canada
