= Defiance season 2 =

Defiance
- Season 2
- Season 2 DVD cover
- No. of episodes: 13

Release
- Original network: Syfy
- Original release: June 19 – August 28, 2014

Season chronology
- ← Previous; Season 1 Next → Season 3

The second season of the American science fiction television series Defiance premiered on Syfy in its new Thursday night timeslot June 19, 2014 and ended on August 28, 2014. The show consisted a total of 13 episodes. The show stars Grant Bowler, Julie Benz, Stephanie Leonidas, Tony Curran, Jaime Murray, Graham Greene, Jesse Rath and James Murray.

The series is produced by Universal Cable Productions, in transmedia collaboration with Trion Worlds, who have released an MMORPG video game of the same name which is tied into the series.

== Cast ==
=== Main cast ===
- Grant Bowler as Joshua Nolan
- Julie Benz as Amanda Rosewater
- Stephanie Leonidas as Irisa Nyira
- Tony Curran as Datak Tarr
- Jaime Murray as Stahma Tarr
- Graham Greene as Rafe McCawley
- Jesse Rath as Alak Tarr
- James Murray as Niles Pottinger

=== Recurring cast ===
- Trenna Keating as Doc Yewll
- Dewshane Williams as Tommy LaSalle
- Justin Rain as Quentin McCawley
- Nicole Muñoz as Christie McCawley Tarr
- Gale Harold as Connor Lang
- William Atherton as Viceroy Mercado
- Linda Hamilton as Pilar McCawley
- Anna Hopkins as Jessica "Berlin" Rainer
- Noah Danby as Sukar
- Ryan Kennedy as Josef
- Kristina Pesic as Deirdre Lamb
- Douglas Nyback as Sgt. Frei Poole
- Robin Dunne as Cai / Reimlu
- America Olivo as Alethea

=== Guest stars ===
- Mia Kirshner as Kenya Rosewater

== Episodes ==
No. overall	No. in season	Title	Directed by	Written by	Original release date	US viewers (millions)
14	1	"The Opposite of Hallelujah"	Michael Nankin	Kevin Murphy	June 19, 2014	2.01
Nine months later, the Earth Republic has taken over Defiance; Niles Pottinger is the new mayor. Datak is in prison, having been found guilty of murdering Colonel Marsh. Alak now runs the family business, but proves weak at running it and Stahma takes over. Rafe McCawley is now working in the gulanite mine, which has been nationalized by the Earth Republic. A mining accident kills a man; his two sons, Josef and Hyatt, vandalize an E-Rep propaganda poster and are arrested. While being transported to prison they are given a staged opportunity to escape, and Hyatt is killed by Hellbugs. Amanda is now managing the Need-Want until Kenya returns, unaware that Stahma murdered Kenya. Nolan searches for Irisa and finds her in the Angel Arc (the ruins of Los Angeles). Irisa returns to Defiance with Nolan, but does not tell him of her visions or actions.
15	2	"In My Secret Life"	Michael Nankin	Michael Taylor	June 26, 2014	1.43
Nolan and Irisa return to Defiance; Irisa attacks Earth Republic Officer Berlin and is arrested. A bomb explodes in the marketplace; Amanda convinces Niles to release Irisa if Nolan finds the bomber within 24 hours. Nolan's investigation leads him to Skevur, who admits that he placed a second bomb in Stahma's car. Nolan rescues Stahma and disarms the bomb, regaining his job as lawkeeper and the respect of the town; Irisa is released. Stahma blames Alak for Skevur's actions, leading Alak to kill Skevur. In the meantime, Datak and Doc Yewll plan their escape from the prison camp.
16	3	"The Cord and the Ax"	Michael Nankin	Allison Miller	July 3, 2014	1.49
Irisa tries to free herself from Irzu but is unable to do so. Believing she has killed Bertie and Sukar, Irisa tries to kill herself; Irzu stops her. Bertie shows up alive and well, as does Sukar. Nolan suspects something is wrong, but Irisa refuses to tell him anything. Amanda suffers from withdrawal symptoms and asks Niles for adreno (an illegal stimulant). Alak visits Datak in prison to tell him about Christie's pregnancy and ask his permission to leave the family business. Datak is furious, realizing that Stahma is running the business and deliberately keeping him in prison. Niles makes a deal with Yewll for her services in a special project, releasing her; she persuades him to release Datak as her assistant. Datak attacks Stahma but relents before he kills her.
17	4	"Beasts of Burden"	Allan Kroeker	Todd Slavkin & Darren Swimmer	July 10, 2014	1.65
While transferring mining equipment to Defiance, Niles and Berlin are attacked by a group of masked raiders, who escape with the supplies and humiliate Niles. Nolan investigates; evidence suggests that Rafe is involved, but Nolan discovers that Josef is the culprit and arrests him. Rafe intercedes, and Nolan releases Josef on the condition that he leave Defiance. Instead, Josef kidnaps Berlin because she saw his face; he is caught and arrested again. Rafe apparently helps him escape, but then kills him. Stahma asks Datak to make her a partner; he refuses, and burns Alak's hand in a record press as punishment for losing control of Stahma and the business. Stahma, furious, has Datak beaten, and throws him out of the business and their house.
18	5	"Put the Damage On"	Allan Kroeker	Nevin Densham	July 17, 2014	1.64
Due to an ego implant device, Amanda, Niles and Doc Yewll are hallucinating. Amanda believes that a man broke into her house and attacked her and at first, since no evidence of the attack was found, Nolan believes that the hallucinations are a result of the adreno Amanda is using. He later finds out about the implant and takes Amanda to Doc Yewll to remove it before it kills Amanda. It is revealed later that Yewll implanted it in Amanda originally on Niles' orders, and did the same to herself and Niles. With the ego, they took Amanda's memories from the last three weeks for unknown reasons. Meanwhile, Datak makes efforts to persuade his family to accept him back, while he is also working with the Votanis Collective to provide him with weapons that will help him take Defiance back from the E-Rep. He asks Rafe's help by promising him that he will get ownership of the mines back when E-Rep leaves town.
19	6	"This Woman's Work"	Allan Arkush	Brian Allen Alexander	July 24, 2014	1.61
Nolan, Niles, Churchill and a squad of Earth Republic soldiers investigate an Arkfall, attempting to retrieve the ship's energy source. They discover that the Ark was a Gulanee transport vessel; a surviving Gulanee attacks and kills the soldiers. Nolan and Niles improvise a weapon; sacrificing Churchill as a distraction, they kill the Gulanee. Tommy sees Irisa attack a man; she reveals her secret to him, and he agrees to help her and keep her secret. Berlin is furious at Tommy's decision to stay in Defiance and breaks up with him. Stahma must face a Castithan holy man, Favi Kurr, after infringing on the strict patriarchal rules of Castithan culture by exiling her husband. She tries to convince other Castithan women to stand by her, but fails, and instead poisons them all and frames Favi Kurr.
20	7	"If You Could See Her Through My Eyes"	Allan Arkush	Brusta Brown & John Mitchell Todd	July 31, 2014	1.48
Datak has sex with a hand-maiden of the Tarr family; she is found dead, eyes missing, the following day. Datak, afraid he will be blamed, investigates; with Rafe's help, he discovers that Dr. Scheck has been stealing Votan eyes to sell on the black market. Nolan and Irisa investigate the disappearance of Rynn; Scheck has captured her and removed her right eye. Nolan and Irisa rescue Rynn; Scheck wounds Irisa and escapes, but is caught by Datak and Rafe. Datak blinds Scheck in a rage, and Rafe covers for him. Nolan discovers that Irisa's injury is completely healed, forcing Irisa to finally tell all. Alak learns about Christie's visits to the Castithan club; they fight, and Alak ends up at the Need/Want with Deirdre.
21	8	"Slouching Towards Bethlehem"	Larry Shaw	Bryan Q. Miller	August 7, 2014	1.62
E-Rep has information about a bomb and an Irathient member of the Votanis Collective, Mahsuvus Gorath, is arrested in hope he will tell them where the bomb is. At the same time, Amanda gets a call from a stranger asking her to help Mahsuvus escape, otherwise her sister will die. She tells Nolan about it and they try to locate where Kenya is held. Amanda, not having a choice, helps Mahsuvus escape but Nolan stops them before they leave town. Stahma asks Datak to kill Mahsuvus because he was working with him and if E-Rep learns about it they will kill them both. Datak takes the opportunity to shoot Mahsuvus when he and Amanda are stopped by Nolan. Nolan pretends to be Mahsuvus during the exchange so they can take Kenya back. Despite their plan not having the result they wanted and the blackmailers escaping, Kenya is left behind and reunites with Amanda. In the meantime, Irisa meets all the other people who were "attacked" and they are now like her and Irzu informs her that it is the time for the "Arkrise" to begin.
22	9	"Painted from Memory"	Larry Shaw	Kevin Murphy	August 14, 2014	1.58
Nolan tries to help Kenya remember but she can only remember the last three weeks and random things from her past. Pottinger runs to Doc Yewll when he finds out that Kenya is alive and tells Yewll that she has to die so she will not remember. Instead, Yewll tries a chemical lobotomy but fails to complete it when Kenya runs away. In the meantime, Stahma tries to understand how Kenya can be alive and along with Datak, they dig out Kenya's body to ensure that she did kill her a year ago. Kenya finds out that something is not right and when she remembers Yewll being at the laboratory she goes to her asking for the truth. Yewll tells her that she is an Indogene and she has about three months to live. Pottinger arrives and tells her that everything was his plan to manage to be with Amanda. He tries to kill her but Kenya escapes. Nolan tells Amanda that the woman who is in Defiance is not Kenya but Amanda still tries to stop Kenya from leaving town with no luck. Amanda organizes a memorial for Kenya, while it is revealed that Quentin was the man who was keeping Kenya captive.
23	10	"Bottom of the World"	Andy Wolk	Anupam Nigam	August 21, 2014	1.42
Ambassador Tennety arrives to inspect the mines and Pottinger takes her to the mines for a tour along with Amanda, Nolan, Irisa and Berlin. While there, there is an explosion that kills the Ambassador and traps Amanda and Pottinger. Nolan asks Rafe to help him rescue them, something that they do before it is too late. Nolan finds a Votan weapon at the mines and realizes that the explosion was not an accident and asks Rafe if he knows anything about it. It is revealed that behind the explosion was Rafe's son, Quentin, who tells his father that he did it to help his mother. Quentin then claims to E-Rep and Nolan, that Rafe was the one who planned them bomb. Rafe takes the blame to protect his son and gets arrested. Alak ends his relationship with Deirdre and asks for Christie's apology for his behavior at the club. Irisa manages to get the terra sphere she needs with Tommy's help and she proceeds to the ritual for the Arkrise.
24	11	"Doll Parts"	Andy Wolk	Phoef Sutton	August 21, 2014	1.50
Dierdre is murdered and Amanda tries to find who the murderer is. The evidence leads her to arrest Alak, but a Castithan man shows up and turns himself in forcing Amanda to let Alak free. It is revealed later that Christie is the one who killed Dierdre as revenge for Deirdre's attempt to make her abort her fetus by poisoning her, so she can be with Alak. Nolan tries to find Irisa and bring her back home but when he finds her, Irisa does not want to go back with Nolan accusing Tommy that he never loved her. Nolan manages with Tommy's help to activate a device that makes all the Votans around them collapse, including Irisa. Nolan and Tommy take her away, but when Irisa wakes up, she knocks out Nolan, stabs Tommy and leaves. Nolan awakens to find Tommy bleeding and he tries to help him before he dies.
25	12	"All Things Must Pass"	Michael Nankin	Todd Slavkin & Darren Swimmer	August 28, 2014	1.35
As Nolan rushes to get Tommy back to Defiance, Tommy dies of his wounds before they arrive. Stahma and Datak are kidnapped by Pottinger after he finds out that the Tarrs were responsible for Kenya's murder. Pottinger takes Amanda to them and tells her what they did, and leaves Amanda with his gun in order to take revenge. She wants to kill Stahma but stops herself at the last minute. Doc Yewll realizes what Irisa is attempting to do and decides to leave her hiding place and go to Defiance to warn them and help them stop Irisa before she can destroy the planet. Pilar visits Rafe in prison just before she reunites with Christie. Nolan finds Cai, the only person who can stop Irisa. Using stones and dirt, Irisa controls the Arks in space, leading them to New York, which they destroy and terraform.
26	13	"I Almost Prayed"	Michael Nankin	Kevin Murphy	August 28, 2014	1.48
Irisa continues with her plan to destroy the world and everyone tries to find a way to stop her. Nolan finds Cai and explains that they just have to separate the two keys that are inside Irisa, so Irzu will stop controlling her but Mercado decides to follow Doc Yewll's plan and kill Irisa. Nolan manages to escape and gets to Irisa in time before Amanda kills her and with Cai, they manage to stop Irzu and save the planet. Pilar kidnaps Christie and Alak and she runs away with them and Quentin. Datak and Stahma free Rafe from prison to help them find Pilar and the three of them leave town to find her. The episode ends with Amanda and Pottinger getting together while Nolan and Irisa are trapped inside the ship that is collapsing and to save themselves, they get into one of the capsules that keep alive all the people who Irisa "saved" before her attempt to destroy the world.

== Production ==
Syfy renewed the show for a second season on May 10, 2013. Production began in Toronto in August 2013, one month after the season one finale. William Atherton and Anna Hopskins' castings were announced on September 5, 2013 while season 2 was in production. James Murray joined the main cast as Defiance's new mayor Niles Pottinger. In addition, Jesse Rath was promoted to series regular. Season one guest star Robin Dunne returned as two different characters. Noah Danby's character was originally going to get killed last season, but was brought back for season 2 due to the praise Danby received for his performance.

== Home media ==
Title	Set details	Blu-ray and DVD release dates			Special features
Title	Set details	Region A / 1	Region B / 2	Region B / 4	Special features
Defiance — Season Two	Discs: 3 (Note: Region 2 has 4 discs.); Episodes: 13	September 23, 2014	January 1, 2015	TBA	Season One Alternate Ending; Deleted Scenes; Gag Reel; Defiance: The Lost Ones Minisodes; Jesse Does Defiance
