= BOTW (disambiguation) =

BotW is an abbreviation for The Legend of Zelda: Breath of the Wild, a 2017 video game for the Wii U, Nintendo Switch, and Nintendo Switch 2.

BotW or BOTW may also refer to:

- Bridge over Troubled Water, album by Simon & Garfunkel
- Bull of the Woods, 1969 album by The 13th Floor Elevators
- Best of the West, American sitcom
- Bank of the West, financial services company
- Band on the Wall, live music venue
- Birds of the World, an online ornithological informational resource
- Dog Man: Brawl of the Wild, the sixth installment in the comedic graphic novel series Dog Man.

== See also ==
- Best of the Worst (disambiguation)
- Bottom of the World (disambiguation)
