= Slouching Towards Bethlehem (disambiguation) =

Slouching Towards Bethlehem is a 1968 collection of essays by Joan Didion and mainly describes her experiences in California during the 1960s.

Slouching Towards Bethlehem may also refer to:

- "Slouching Toward Bethlehem" (Angel), an episode of Angel
- "Slouching Towards Bethlehem", a song by Joni Mitchell from Night Ride Home
- "Slouching Toward Bethlehem" (Defiance), an episode of Defiance
- "Slouching Towards Branson" by Will Wood

== See also ==
- The Second Coming (poem), a poem by William Butler Yeats that contains this line
