= Beast of Burden =

A Beast of burden is a working animal

- Pack animal

Beast of Burden may also refer to:

- "Beast of Burden" (song), by The Rolling Stones, 1978
- Beast of Burden (film), a 2018 American film
- "Beast of Burden" (Stargate SG-1), a 2001 television episode
- Beast of Burden, a miniature figure by Martian Metals
- "Beasts of Burden" (Defiance), a 2014 television episode
- "Beasts of Burden" (Saving Hope), a 2015 television episode
- Beasts of Burden, a comic book miniseries by Evan Dorkin and Jill Thompson
- "Beasts of Burden", a 2000 issue in the Marvel Comics X-Men: Gambit series
