= The Cord and the Ax =

- Defiance episode
- Episode no.: Season 2 Episode 3
- Directed by: Michael Nankin
- Written by: Allison Miller
- Original air date: July 3, 2014

Guest appearances
- Dewshane Williams (Tommy LaSalle); Trenna Keating (Doc Yewll); Nicole Muñoz (Christie Tarr); Noah Danby (Sukar); Anna Hopkins (Jessica "Berlin" Rainer); Jessica Nichols (Bertie); Kristina Pesic (Deirdre Lamb); Ryan Kennedy (Josef); Robin Dunne (Cai/Reimlu)

Episode chronology
← Previous "In My Secret Life"	Next → "Beasts of Burden"
- Defiance season 2

"The Cord and the Ax" is the third episode of the second season of the American science fiction series Defiance, and the series' fifteenth episode overall. It was aired on July 3, 2014. The episode was written by Allison Miller and directed by Michael Nankin.

== Plot ==
Stahma (Jaime Murray) and Alak (Jesse Rath) are invited to Rafe's (Graham Greene) house for a family dinner where Christie (Nicole Muñoz) wants to announce that she is pregnant but the surprise is ruined because Stahma can smell it. Everyone is really happy with the news and Rafe, after the rumors around the town of Alak killing Skevur, talks to Alak to warn him to stay away from Datak's (Tony Curran) business, especially now that he is going to be a father.

Irisa (Stephanie Leonidas) tries to get away from Irzu's (Katie Douglas) influence and break the deal she made with her because she does not want to kill anymore, but she fails. She follows Bertie (Jessica Nichols) and kills her and the next day, Rafe and Christie go to Nolan (Grant Bowler) to inform him about Bertie's disappearance. Nolan sends Irisa to Berlin (Anna Hopkins) to check the security footage from the marketplace but he knows that something is wrong with Irisa and searches her things. Nolan finds Liberata blood on Irisa's gloves while Irzu destroys the footage before Berlin can see that Bertie was attacked by Irisa.

Irisa runs away to find Sukar (Noah Danby) and ask for his help. While the two of them talk, Irzu appears again to take over Irisa and she kills Sukar as well. A desperate Irisa takes Sukar's rifle and tries to kill herself but Irzu stops her and heals the wound while telling Iriza that she does not really kill those people but sends them under her protection. Irisa wakes up after a while fully healed and found by Bertie who is alive and well. The two of them are headed back to Defiance and on their way back, they run into Nolan and Rafe. Nolan tries to make Irisa tell him the truth but both Irisa and Bertie deny that anything is wrong. Meanwhile, it is revealed that Sukar and the woman Irisa "killed" at the Angel Arc are also alive.

Meanwhile, at the Need/Want a man treats badly to a woman and Amanda (Julie Benz), suffering from withdraw symptoms from the Blue Devil, attacks him to protect the woman instead of talking to him. Nolan gets there in time to stop the fight and later, Amanda goes to Niles (James Murray) to ask for some of the Blue Devil he has in his office.

Alak visits Datak at the E-Rep Camp to inform him about Christie's pregnancy and ask his permission to step out of the family business and concentrate on music. Datak denies him that when he realizes that his fears that Stahma keeps him in prison so she can have power and money are true, he gets furious. Alak leaves telling him that he is the one responsible for what is happening to him and not Stahma because he could not control himself. Alak returns home where Stahma waits for him and gives him Datak's blade, the only thing Datak could brought from their hometown, so Alak can protect his family now; Christie and their unborn child. Stahma also tells him that they should never let Datak come back home.

Back in prison, Datak tells Doc Yewll (Trenna Keating) about Stahma and that he has to get back home. Niles visits Yewll to ask her about the diary he found on her office. He offers her release from prison and her severed finger in exchange for her service on the secret project. Yewll agrees to start working on her project that is on the diary but refuses to do anything more that has to do with Irisa and also puts as term Datak's release to be her assistant. Niles accepts and Yewll and Datak are headed back to Defiance.

Datak comes home to find Stahma and Alak in the family bath. He joins them while they look surprised and terrified but try to hide it. Datak attacks Stahma and tries to drown her but Alak fights him back trying to protect his mother. Finally, Datak stops and releases Stahma.

== Feature music ==
The following songs are on "The Cord and the Ax":

- "Eaten Alive" by Young Beautiful in a Hurry
- "Roads" by Portishead

== Reception ==
=== Ratings ===
In its original American broadcast, "The Cord and the Ax" was watched by 1.49 million; slightly up by 0.06 from the previous episode.

=== Reviews ===
"The Cord and the Ax" received positive reviews.

Rowan Kaiser of The A.V. Club gave the episode a B+ rating saying that Defiance has improved this season saying about the last scene on the Tarr bath: "This is a scene that would likely be a critical one for the series no matter how it was presented, so it had viewers’ attention. To make it silent, playing out without any dialogue, is a damn bold move. But it's a wise one. [...] The social power of the Castithan family bathing rituals [...] adds a dramatic weight similar to Rafe's use of a family dinner to threaten Alak's life. The aesthetics of the Castithan house, with its pure white and its cleanliness shaking the dirt off of Datak, add even more weight."

Jesse Schedeen from IGN rated the episode with 8.5/10. "As much as I feel like this show is wasting good storytelling potential in terms of the tension between Defiance and the E-Rep, there's plenty of smaller character drama to keep this show moving. The Tarr family was as fascinating as ever in this episode. And as Irisa and Amanda struggle with their personal demons, the show is making better use of its full cast as it did in Season 1".

Billy Grifter of Den of Geek gave a good review to the episode saying that the second season has some interesting new story threads and character developments to follow. "Having laid out the new status quo and character motivations in the first two episodes, in The Cord And The Ax the writers set out on a destructive path to destabilise just about every cosy structure they’d previously created. In doing this, they delivered both the very best of what Defiance does, and some of the worst, for good measure."
