= All Things Must Pass (disambiguation) =

All Things Must Pass is a 1970 album by George Harrison.

"All Things Must Pass" may also refer to:

== Music ==
- "All Things Must Pass" (song), the 1970 album's title track; first recorded by Billy Preston under the name "All Things (Must) Pass"
- "All Things Must Pass", song by The Pooh Sticks from their album Optimistic Fool (1995)
- "All Things Must Pass", song by Lynch Mob from their EP Syzygy (1998)
- "All Things Must Pass", song by The Waterboys from their CD single "Everybody Takes a Tumble" (2007)
- "All Things Must Pass", song by The Jesus and Mary Chain from the Heroes soundtrack (2008)
- "All Things Must Pass", song by Waterfront from their album Ghosts of the Good (2011)

== Film and television ==
- "All Things Must Pass" (Defiance), a 2014 television episode
- All Things Must Pass: The Rise and Fall of Tower Records, documentary by Colin Hanks (2015)

== See also ==
- "All Things Come to Pass", song by The Babies (2010)
