= If You Could See Her Through My Eyes =

- Defiance episode
- Episode no.: Season 2 Episode 7
- Directed by: Allan Arkush
- Written by: Brusta Brown; John Mitchell Todd
- Original air date: July 31, 2014

Guest appearances
- Trenna Keating (Doc Yewll); Nicole Muñoz (Christie Tarr); Kristina Pesic (Deirdre Lamb); William Atherton (Viceroy Mercado); Robin Dunne (Cai)

Episode chronology
| ← Previous "This Woman's Work" | Next → "Slouching Towards Bethlehem" |
- Defiance season 2

"If You Could See Her Through My Eyes" is the seventh episode of the second season of the American science fiction series Defiance, and the series' nineteenth episode overall. It was aired on July 31, 2014. The episode was written by Brusta Brown & John Mitchell Todd and directed by Allan Arkush.

== Plot ==
Datak (Tony Curran) wakes up to find Jalina (Kelly McCormack), the Tarr's hand-maiden and who he spent the night with, dead on his doorstep with her eyes missing. Datak calls Doc Yewll (Trenna Keating) to help him find out what happened and to get rid of the body. Yewll does not want to help him though since she does not want to end up in prison again and she leaves him alone. Datak is afraid that they will blame him for the murder and he does not want to report it to Nolan (Grant Bowler), so he calls Rafe (Graham Greene) for help. Rafe helps him to transfer the body to a hellbug area to be eaten and then they both start to search for Jalina's murderer.

Stahma (Jaime Murray) worries about Jalina who did not come home and reports her disappearance to Nolan. Nolan thinks that the disappearance is the same as Bertie's few days before and tells her that probably Jalina will be back in few days. Datak informs Stahma later about Jalina's death and they agree to find who is responsible without involving the lawkeeper while Nolan asks Irisa (Stephanie Leonidas) if she has anything to do with this.

Irisa tries to induce visions of the man she saw on the Votan ship by hurting herself since the wound will heal. She draws the man's face when Rynn (Tiio Horn) interrupts her to ask her help finding Sukar who is missing. Rynn sees the sketch of the man and tells Irisa that this man is Cai (Robin Dunne) and he is with her in Defiance. Irisa insists on meeting him and when Rynn introduces her to him and Irisa asks him if he recognizes her, Cai says he has never seen her before.

Yewll gets a lead of who might be responsible for Jalina's death when Professor Lambert (Gilles Savard) comes to her office for eye drops and she calls Datak. Datak heads to Lambert's place with Rafe where Lambert tells them that he got the eyes from doctor Otto Scheck (Sean Arbuckle). At the same time, Rynn goes missing and Cai tells Irisa who goes straight to Nolan. The two of them go to Yewll who tells them about what is happening and gives them the names of other surgeon doctors in Defiance to investigate them.

While Dr. Scheck is ready to remove Rynn's second eye, Nolan and Irisa show up and stop him. Scheck manages to stab Irisa on the shoulder and runs away, only to run into Datak and Rafe who were coming to his office. Datak removes Scheck's eyes with his bare hands before Nolan gets there. Irisa follows Nolan who can see that her wound is totally healed. Later, Irisa has a last encounter with Cai where she kisses him to show him her visions from the Votan ship. After seeing the vision, Cai freaks out and immediately leaves the town.

Christie (Nicole Muñoz) and Alak (Jesse Rath) prepare to have lunch at the Arc radio station with Deirdre (Kristina Pesic) who snaps the opportunity to give Christie the Castithan gem that Viceroy gave her the previous night at the club. Alak asks Christie where she found it and she tells him that she bought it from the marketplace but he does not believe her. Alak leaves and Deirdre apologizes to Christie for causing her troubles.

Later, Deirdre informs Alak where Christie got the gem and Alak goes to the club to find his wife. When he gets there, he causes a scene and the two of them have a fight with Alak leaving and Christie staying at the club. Alak returns to the Need/Want where he finds Deirdre and the two of them get together.

The episode ends with Nolan cutting Irisa's hand just to see her healing powers on his own. Irisa finally tells him what is going on and Nolan reassures her that he will help her and be there for her till they find out what exactly is going on.

== Feature music ==
In the "If You Could See Her Through My Eyes" we can hear the songs:

- "Fire Breather" by Laurel
- "Finest Line" by Mike Sempert

== Reception ==
=== Ratings ===
In its original American broadcast, "If You Could See Her Through My Eyes" was watched by 1.48 million; down by 0.13 from the previous episode.

=== Reviews ===
"If You could See Her Through My Eyes" received positive reviews.

Rowan Kaiser from The A.V. Club gave a B rating to the episode saying that the episode did a good job at putting its theme out there. "Defiance’s plot may still give me trouble, but the show works at so many other thematic and visual levels that I think it’s still a success. But if it manages to tie the two together, it could be something special."

Michel Ahr of Den of Geek rated the episode with 4.5/5 saying that episode after episode was stellar this season. "It’s the first time we’ve seen two of the storylines linked without the knowledge of the key players. [...] Defiance deserves top marks for keen writing and consistently phenomenal entertainment."

Billy Grifter from Den of Geek gave a good review to the episode saying that the second season of the show gets better and better and that the episode was both entertaining and divisive in equal measure. "It might seem early to cook up an end-of-season storm, but those behind Defiance are obviously planning something big to start so early. This season of defiance just gets better, and I can’t wait to see what crazy places it will take us next."

Andrew Santos of With an Accent gave a good review to the episode saying that the second season continues to surpass its entertaining, yet slightly mediocre first season with each new episode that airs and that "If You Could See Her Through My Eyes" was a great episode. "While at times it may seem like there’s too much going in the town in which the show takes place, overall it feels pretty balanced."
