= Painted from Memory (Defiance) =

- Defiance episode
- Episode no.: Season 2 Episode 9
- Directed by: Larry Shaw
- Written by: Kevin Murphy
- Original air date: August 14, 2014

Guest appearances
- Mia Kirschner (Kenya Rosewater); Dewshane Williams (Tommy LaSalle); Trenna Keating (Doc Yewll); Noah Danby (Sukar); Anna Hopkins (Jessica "Berlin" Rainer); Justin Rain (Quentin McCawley); Kristina Pesic (Deirdre Lamb)

Episode chronology
← Previous "Slouching Towards Bethlehem"	Next → "Bottom of the World"
- Defiance season 2

"Painted From Memory" is the ninth episode of the second season of the American science fiction series Defiance, and the series' twenty-first episode overall. It was aired on August 14, 2014. The episode was written by Kevin Murphy and directed by Larry Shaw.

== Plot ==
Nolan (Grant Bowler) tries to make Kenya (Mia Kirshner) remember what happened and why she left Defiance a year ago, but Kenya can not remember. She only remembers the last three weeks and a few things from her past but nothing about the moment she left or why and where she was for a whole year. Nolan insists on questioning her but Amanda (Julie Benz) takes Kenya to Need/Want telling him that they can continue tomorrow. Stahma (Jaime Murray) is at the Need/Want the moment Kenya arrives with Amanda and is in shock seeing her alive and runs away.

The next day, Nolan continues to push Kenya to remember and she remembers that she woke up in a glass tube filled with water and was then abducted by the Votanis Collective (VC). When VC broke into the laboratory, they killed everyone except her because as they said, she was Amanda's sister and that would be helpful for them. Kenya remembers two other people also being at the laboratory but she can not remember their faces.

When Pottinger (James Murray) finds out that Kenya is alive, he runs to Doc Yewll's (Trenna Keating) office to ask how that is possible. It is revealed that they were the ones who were experimenting on Kenya (who is in reality an Indogene in human form) and that is why they tried to steal Amanda's memories a few days before. Pottinger tells Yewll that Kenya has to die but Yewll says that she can perform a chemical lobotomy on her so she will never remember.

Yewll attempts to perform the chemical lobotomy, lying to Amanda and Kenya that it is a new technique that will help her remember. Kenya gets ready for the procedure but a flashback makes her react badly and she runs away before Yewll does the lobotomy. Later Nolan visits Kenya in a new attempt to help her remember and realizes that Kenya remembers only things that Amanda knew about her, because she told her she was there. When Nolan sees that Kenya's scars, from beatings at the hand of her late husband, have disappeared, he realizes that she is not Kenya.

In the meantime, Stahma tries to figure out how Kenya can be alive since she killed and buried her a year ago. She asks Datak (Tony Curran) to help her dig up the body just to confirm that Kenya is indeed dead. Datak tells her that he never believed that she had killed Kenya but Stahma insists that she did. After spending a whole day digging, Datak finally finds Kenya's body and Stahma now knows that the woman who is in town is not Kenya. Stahma finds Amanda to let her know about it but Amanda does not believe her. Later, Nolan also tells Amanda the same thing and she finally accepts that they are telling the truth.

Meanwhile, Kenya realizes that something is wrong with her and when she remembers Yewll and Pottinger being at the laboratory, she grabs a gun and goes to Yewll's office. She asks for the truth and Yewll tells her that she has only about three months to live. Pottinger arrives and takes the gun from Kenya, telling her that the whole thing was his idea. He wanted to bring Kenya back home so that Amanda would see him as a hero and he would be there to console her when Kenya would die later. He tries to kill Kenya, but both Kenya and Yewll manage to escape.

Yewll goes to Datak for help and along with Rafe (Graham Greene) they take her to hide underground in the remains of Old Saint Louis. Kenya goes to Need/Want and takes all the money to leave town. Amanda arrives and tries to stop her but she can not do it. After Kenya's departure, Amanda holds a memorial for her late sister.

At the end of the episode we see a man burning the mask of the man who was holding Kenya captive and it is revealed that it is Quentin (Justin Rain), Rafe's son.

== Feature music ==
In the "Painted From Memory" we can hear the song "What's Up" by Fyfe Monroe.

== Reception ==
=== Ratings ===
In its original American broadcast, "Painted From Memory" was watched by 1.58 million; slightly down by 0.04 from the previous episode.

=== Reviews ===
"Painted From Memory" received mixed reviews.

Kris from Movie Trailer Reviews gave the episode a B rating saying that it was better than the last one because it tied together several plots. "Overall things are coming together and this episode put my fears aside and gave me confidence everything would work out in the end. I do still wish they would give us a bigger view of the world of Defiance but I’ve come to terms with the fact that this won’t happen."

Rowan Kaiser of The A.V. Club gave the episode a C+ rating saying that Quentin's return was unnecessary since his plot in the first season were the weakest and that Kenya's return was all about re-engaging with the first season. "In short, almost every single aspect of “Painted From Memory” served as a direct continuation of first-season storylines, and I think that demands questions. What is gained by bringing Quentin and Kenya back? Is the story improved by this diversion into the past? And I think the answer, while somewhat ambiguous, comes down mostly on "No!""

Katelyn Barnes of Geeks Unleashed rated the episode with 7/10 saying that the show managed to shatter the hopes that raised so high in the previous episode with Kenya's return. "[Kenya's] emotional return in Slouching Towards Bethlehem was emotional and heartwarming [...] Well, turns out Kenya never returned, she’s dead, skull in the ground dead, and the Kenya walking around Defiance? Yeah, she’s a Cylon."

Michael Ahr of Den of Geek rated the episode with 3/5 saying that the show was due for a misstep and that the episode had plenty of entertaining callbacks from season 1. "I’m sure Defiance will bounce back from this misstep, and truth be told, the show was due for a dud."

Billy Grifter from Den of Geek said that the show managed to surprise him this week and he did not know if he was happy or really infuriated. "Part of me liked that I’d got it wrong last week when I’d concluded that the masked assailant was Niles, because I’d forgotten about another missing character. But what was transplanted into its place made very little sense at times, and was as close as the show has come to a true shark-jumping moment."
