= I Almost Prayed =

- Defiance episode
- Episode no.: Season 2 Episode 13
- Directed by: Michael Nankin
- Written by: Kevin Murphy
- Original air date: August 28, 2014

Guest appearances
- Linda Hamilton (Pilar McCawley); Dewshane Williams (Tommy LaSalle); Trenna Keating (Doc Yewll); Nicole Muñoz (Christie Tarr); Justin Rain (Quentin McCawley); Anna Hopkins (Jessica "Berlin" Rainer); America Olivo (Alethea); Noah Danby (Sukar); Douglas Nyback (Sgt. Frei Poole); William Atherton (Viceroy Mercado); Robin Dunne (Cai)

Episode chronology
← Previous "All Things Must Pass"	Next → "The World We Seize"
- Defiance season 2

"I Almost Prayed" is the thirteenth episode and season finale of the second season of the American science fiction series Defiance, and the series' twenty-fifth episode overall. It was aired on August 28, 2014. The episode was written by Kevin Murphy and directed by Michael Nankin. The episode aired back-to-back with the previous episode, "All Things Must Pass".

The episode features the song "Satan Your Kingdom Must Come Down" by Robert Plant.

== Plot ==
Nolan (Grant Bowler) forces Cai (Robin Dunne) to go with him so they can stop Irisa (Stephanie Leonidas) who continues with Irzu's plan to destroy the planet. Cai explains to Nolan that since Irisa kissed him, he has visions of a past life or from their ancestors and how they stopped the Kaziri. Nolan figures out that to be able to stop Irisa, they have to separate the two keys which are both inside Irisa.

Datak (Tony Curran) returns home and finds Pilar (Linda Hamilton) talking with Stahma (Jaime Murray). Pilar wants Christie (Nicole Muñoz) and Alak (Jesse Rath) to go and live with her for a while but Stahma disagrees with her, making the two women argue. Datak asks Pilar to leave and Pilar decides to convince Christie and Alak to go with her since the Tarr family will not allow them to do so. When they are ready to leave, Alak notices something is wrong and does not want to leave, leading Pilar and Quentin (Justin Rain) to kidnap them. The Tarrs' handmaiden informs Datak and Stahma about the kidnapping and the two of them free Rafe (Graham Greene) from the E-rep camp so they can find Pilar. Berlin (Anna Hopkins) had previously tried to stop the execution of Rafe and found herself nearly being executed herself but she is saved when the Tarrs come to take Rafe.

Mercado (William Atherton) returns to Defiance as soon as they hear the news about New York being destroyed and they try to find a way to stop Irisa. Mercado asks Amanda's help and Nolan arrives at Defiance with Cai explaining how they can stop Irisa. Amanda and Pottinger do not believe his story but Mercado does and wants to follow Nolan's plan. That is until Doc Yewll (Trenna Keating) arrives and tells them that she knows how to stop Irisa; by killing her. Nolan reacts to that and Amanda asks to lock him up because he will never cooperate if Irisa has to be killed. E-rep soldiers take Nolan and Cai to prison but before they can lock them up, Nolan manages to fight back so that he and Cai can escape.

Yewll starts to explain to Amanda and Pottinger what they must do to kill Irisa but Amanda first wants to know why Yewll made a fake Kenya. Yewll lies to her, claiming that she was working with the Votanis Collective as a spy for Pottinger and that the VC forced her to do it. Yewll claims she never told Pottinger about it because she knew he would stop her. Yewll's lie allows Pottinger, the true culprit, to avoid arousing Amanda's suspicion. After the explanations, the three of them leave to find Irisa.

The three find Irisa but at the moment Amanda is ready to shoot her, Nolan and Cai arrive and Nolan shoots Amanda's gun, disarming her. Nolan cuffs Amanda and knocks out Pottinger and Yewll. Irisa hears the noise and tries to run away from Cai, but Nolan captures her and Cai manages to transfer one of the two keys into himself causing the keys stop controlling Irisa. Irisa wakes up and when she realizes that she killed Tommy she asks Nolan to kill her, but Nolan convinces her that she has to fight to help save the planet from Irzu.

Nolan, Cai, and Irisa get into the ship to finish their mission and stop Irzu, who continues to try in vain to convince Irisa to change her mind until the last possible moment. Cai and Irisa deactivate the ship and save the planet. Cai manages to get out of the ship before it collapses; Irisa and Nolan become trapped, and they enter one of the capsules to protect themselves. At the same time, Amanda and Pottinger, knowing that they are now safe, get together. Yewll goes back to her office and Datak, Stahma, and Rafe follow Pilar to take back Christie and Alak.

== Reception ==
=== Ratings ===
In its original American broadcast, "I Almost Prayed" was watched by 1.48 million; up by 0.13 from the previous episode.

=== Reviews ===
"I Almost Prayed" received mixed reviews.

Rowan Kaiser from The A.V. Club gave the episode a B+ rating and commenting on both episodes (I Almost Prayed and All Things Must Pass that aired the same night) said that this was what he wanted from the show and that the last two episodes were better than Defiance has ever been. "The potentially complex characterization of the entire season was turned into actual characterization here. [...] Meanwhile, the mythology that’s been hovering over the entire season regained its connection to Irisa’s characterization, and gave its apparent world-shattering effects the visual/musical power to justify the supposed threat."

Michael Ahr of Den of Geek rated the episode with 4/5 saying that the finale of the season "has us hoping for Season 3" and he says that he is duly impressed by the whole second season. "While not a flawless ending to season 2, both episodes together had some killer character moments and truly excellent special effects (Bear McCreary’s epic music didn’t hurt either) that left me craving a renewal for Syfy’s flagship series."

Jesse Schedeen from IGN gave a mixed review to the episode rating it with 7.3/10 saying "This wasn't a perfect finale episode by any means. The conclusion was rushed, and the material focused on Pilar McCawley would have been better off in a different episode entirely. On the other hand, it offered an emotionally satisfying conclusion to Irisa's struggle, and most of the main characters enjoyed memorable moments."

Katelyn Barnes of Geeks Unleashed rated the episode with 6/10 saying that both episodes worked hand in hand in bring Season Two to a satisfying if convenient close but she found the first of the two to be the strongest. "Altogether, I thought these last two episodes were a much stronger finale than last year’s, and with all the surprising twists and dramatic and dark character growth, matched the overall improvement of Defiance these past few months."

Andrew Santos from With an Accent gave a good review to the episode saying that it was a solid finale in a season that far surpasses its preceding one. "The conclusion was open ended and left plenty of questions to be answered in the following season. [...] The show can’t end without these being answered. I’m currently crossing my fingers hoping Defiance gets picked up for a third season."

Billy Grifter of Den of Geek gave a mixed review to the last two episodes saying that the finale was unsatisfying and the show hasn't found its feet. About I Almost Prayed, Grifter said that the episode "was a struggle from the outset, and became increasingly rocky the further along this road it went".
