= Doll Parts (Defiance) =

- Defiance episode
- Episode no.: Season 2 Episode 11
- Directed by: Andy Wolk
- Written by: Phoef Sutton
- Original air date: August 21, 2014

Guest appearances
- Dewshane Williams (Tommy LaSalle); Nicole Muñoz (Christie Tarr); Anna Hopkins (Jessica "Berlin" Rainer); Noah Danby (Sukar); Kristina Pesic (Deirdre Lamb); Douglas Nyback (Sgt. Frei Poole); America Olivo (Alethea)

Episode chronology
← Previous "Bottom of the World"	Next → "All Things Must Pass"
- Defiance season 2

"Doll Parts" is the eleventh episode of the second season of the American science fiction series Defiance, and the series' twenty-third episode overall. It was aired on August 21, 2014. The episode was written by Phoef Sutton and directed by Andy Wolk. The episode aired back-to-back with the previous episode, "Bottom of the World".

== Plot ==
The episode starts with the murder of Deirdre (Kristina Pesic) when someone throws her from the Arch. Amanda (Julie Benz) goes to Nolan (Grant Bowler) to ask for his help to find the murderer but Nolan has to find Irisa (Stephanie Leonidas) who has disappeared. Since he can not investigate the murder, he gives Amanda a deputy's badge so she can make the investigation.

Nolan tracks Irisa and tries to understand what she plans to do, when Tommy (Dewshane Williams), who also now has Irzu inside him, finds Nolan and threatens him with a gun. Nolan fights back and while they are fighting, Tommy rejects Irzu and controls his body again. Nolan explains that Irzu is not a god but the artificial intelligence of the ship that is buried under old Saint Louis and pretends to be a god. Tommy informs Nolan that Irzu wants to destroy the world and the two of them team up to stop this from happening and to help Irisa.

Tommy takes Nolan to the camp so he can talk to Irisa. Irisa accuses him for never having loved her and for killing too many Votans and tells him that he can not save her. Nolan tries to tell her that Irzu is not real and the two of them are arguing when Sukar (Noah Danby) comes in and stops them. Nolan provokes Sukar and the two of them start to fight while Tommy activates a device that makes all the Votans collapse. Nolan and Tommy take the unconscious Irisa and leave.

Back in Defiance, Amanda tries to find the murderer with Berlin's (Anna Hopkins) help. They find out from Deirdre's agenda that the night before she was killed, she had an appointment with Datak (Tony Curran) so Amanda goes to his place for questions. From their conversation, and a talk she had with Deirdre at the Need/Want, Amanda realizes that Alak (Jesse Rath) was sleeping with her and was the person Deirdre was in love with.

Amanda and Berlin arrest Alak after he lies about his relationship with Deirdre and after finding a tape of him threatening to kill her if she talks to Christie (Nicole Muñoz). In the meantime, one of the Tarr family servants, finds a bloody microphone hidden under Alak's bed and shows it to Stahma (Jaime Murray). Christie and Stahma visit Alak in prison where Christie says that she believes him about being innocent but she now knows that he betrayed her while Alak believes his mother or father killed Dierdre and framed him to teach him a lesson.

Stahma, believing that Datak framed Alak, visits a dying Castithan and makes a deal with him. If he confess that he was the one who killed Deirdre then the Tarr family will make sure that his daughter will always have a job at their home as a handmaiden after his death. The man accepts the deal and goes to Amanda with the murder weapon (the bloody microphone), turning himself which leaves Amanda with no other choice than to let Alak free.

Stahma then visits Datak to ask him why he would frame his own son but Datak tells her that he did not kill Deirdre and that he assumed she was the one who killed her. Stahma realizes that the one who killed Deirdre was Christie while at the same time, Alak arrives back home where Christie confesses to him what she did and why she did it. Deirdre tried to kill their baby by poisoning her so she could be with Alak. The two of them fought and Christie ended up throwing Deirdre from the Arch.

The episode ends with Irisa waking up while Nolan and Tommy are driving her away from the rest of the Votans until they find a way to help her. She knocks out Nolan, stabs Tommy and then leaves. Nolan wakes up and finds Tommy bleeding and tries to help him before he dies.

== Featured music ==
In the "Doll Parts" we can hear the songs:

- "Doll Parts" by Hole
- "Doll Parts" by Fyfe Monroe
- "Doll Parts" by Vital Fire
- "Dark Charms" by Banta

== Reception ==
=== Ratings ===
In its original American broadcast, "Doll Parts" was watched by 1.50 million; up by 0.08 from the previous episode.

=== Reviews ===
"Doll Parts" received positive reviews.

Kris from Movie Trailer Reviews gave an A− rating to the episode saying that he enjoyed the episode and like the way the two main plots unfolded. "I like see the evolution of Christie as well as learning more about what’s going on with Irisa. [...] My only real negative was Amanda running the "investigation" and the attempt to make Deirdre seem like a normal, not crazy woman."

Rowan Kaiser of The A.V. Club gave the episode a B rating and commenting on both episodes (Doll Parts and Bottom of the World that aired the same night) says that the human motivation that was present in the second season so far, has largely been replaced by mythology. "This is a consistent disappointment thanks to the "resistance story" setup of the second season. The resistance story is powerful primarily because it accents the essential humanity of its major characters. The resistance is forced to compromise their ideals in order to achieve victory; those in power are forced to exert their essential humanity in the face of the issues of maintaining power. [...] Something still might happen to knock the E-Rep out, but it’s no longer a built-up human story. And yes, I will almost always prefer a story based on human motivations to one based on mystery and mythology."

Katelyn Barnes from Geeks Unleashed rated the episode with 8/10 commenting that Irisa's storyline is finally moving on but she "found the fallout surrounding Treasure Doll much more interesting".

Michael Ahr of Den of Geek rated the episode with 4/5 saying that it was better to air the two episodes together because neither of the two episodes would have sarisfied on its own. "...the two [episodes] together felt like a intricate unfolding of relationships with a variety of changes for the principal characters to absorb and plenty of time to draw out the associated emotions."

Ashley Binion from The Nerd Machine rated the episode with 4/5 commenting that the two episodes "needed to be seen consecutively as neither episode was particularly excellent on its own". About Doll Parts she says that Amanda was the star of the episode.

Billy Grifter of Den of Geek commented on Deidre's story saying that the season had some very soap opera plotlines but the positive side of that story is that Alak’s character has grown up, and Christie isn’t the rather twee girl-next-door any more.
