= Slouching Towards Bethlehem (Defiance) =

- Defiance episode
- Episode no.: Season 2 Episode 8
- Directed by: Larry Shaw
- Written by: Bryan Q. Miller
- Original air date: August 7, 2014

Guest appearances
- Mia Kirschner (Kenya Rosewater); Dewshane Williams (Tommy LaSalle); Trenna Keating (Doc Yewll); Noah Danby (Sukar); Anna Hopkins (Jessica "Berlin" Rainer); Kristina Pesic (Deirdre Lamb); Douglas Nyback (Sgt. Frei Poole); William Atherton (Viceroy Mercado)

Episode chronology
← Previous "This Woman's Work"	Next → "Painted from Memory"
- Defiance season 2

"Slouching Towards Bethlehem" is the eighth episode of the second season of the American science fiction series Defiance, and the series' twentieth episode overall. It was aired on August 7, 2014. The episode was written by Bryan Q. Miller and directed by Larry Shaw.

== Plot ==
Nolan (Grant Bowler), Irisa (Stephanie Leonidas) and some E-Rep soldiers make a raid at the Need/Want to arrest Mahsuvus Gorath (Merwin Mondesir), an Irathient man who works for the Votanis Collective (VC). The E-Rep has information about a bomb in New York City and Mahsuvus can give them details of where it is. As Mahsuvus is interrogated, Amanda (Julie Benz) gets a phone call from a stranger who asks her to help Mahsuvus escape otherwise Kenya (Mia Kirshner) will die.

Nolan tortures Mahsuvus with shrills in order to give them the information they need but shrills do not work on Mahsuvus. Viceroy orders the use of an EGO implant, so they can get the information they need from Mahsuvus' memories, even though the implant will be fatal. Amanda knows that if Mahsuvus dies she will never get Kenya back. She informs Nolan about the call and asks his help. Nolan tells her that he can not do anything about Mahsuvus but he asks her hailer so he can track the location of the blackmailer the next time he calls.

Irisa convinces Nolan to let her go and track the blackmailer since she can not be killed. On her way though, she has a new vision and changes her direction. She gets trapped by the Castithan woman Irisa attacked back in the Angel Arc and Irisa tells her that she was the one who started everything and who attacked her. While they talk, Sukar (Noah Danby) appears along with Bertie and all the people who got "attacked" and are now like Irisa. Irzu (Katie Douglas) tells Irisa that everything now begins and she names it "Arkrise".

Back in Defiance, Stahma (Jaime Murray) is interrogated as well about how she and her family is connected to Mahsuvus. She tells Berlin (Anna Hopkins) and Tommy (Dewshane Williams) that her husband has some business with him but nothing more. She then goes to Datak (Tony Curran) to warn him about it, especially after she learn that the E-Rep was going to implant an EGO device to Mahsuvus, since she knows that Mahsuvus was providing him and Rafe (Graham Greene) with weapons to use to overthrow the E-Rep government. If the E-Rep finds out about this, they are going to kill all three of them, so she gives Datak a rifle and asks him to "take care" of the issue.

In the meantime, Kenya tries to escape and manages to get away for a while before her captor gets her again. Kenya manages to send a message to Amanda to not do what they asked her but when Kenya is recaptured, Amanda goes on with her plan to help Mahsuvus escape. She manages to get him out of the interrogation room but Nolan gets in time to stop her before they leave the town. This gives the opportunity to Datak to shoot and kill Mahsuvus but before he dies, Mahsuvus gives the location of the bomb to Nolan.

Amanda blames Nolan for what happened and for Kenya's death since now that Mahsuvus is dead, the VC people are going to kill her. Nolan promises her they will take Kenya back since VC do not know that Mahsuvus is dead. Nolan dresses up like Mahsuvus and pretends to be him to the exchange. Nolan shoots the blackmailers who escape and they leave Kenya behind. Amanda and Kenya finally meet each other again.

== Reception ==
=== Ratings ===
In its original American broadcast, "Slouching Towards Bethlehem" was watched by 1.62 million; up by 0.14 from the previous episode.

=== Reviews ===
"Slouching Towards Bethlehem" received mixed reviews.

Michael Ahr from Den of Geek rated the episode with 4.5/5 stating that "the magnificence of the writing all summer has been in the details. [...] [The details] are the little touches that have made this season great."

Katelyn Barnes of Geeks Unleashed rated the episode with 8/10 saying that it was pretty incredible. "I think the show is on more secure footing when it focuses on the town of Defiance and the intrigue there, but if the rest of this season can develop an interesting storyline out of this resistance effort, I’ll be happy to watch."

Rowan Kaiser from The A.V. Club gave the episode a B rating saying that he had become a little disappointed with the show over the course of the season. "Most other shorter-episode shows, including Defiance, work on a model of building toward the season finale or the penultimate episode...and that’s it. Everything goes in that direction. This can be fine if there are enough great individual procedural episodes to maintain interest, but TV dramas rarely seem to manage that anymore. [...] en episodes of build-up may not always be worth it. [...] If nothing else, “Slouching Toward Bethlehem” starts pushing Defiance toward a climax."

Andrew Santos of With an Accent gave a good review to the episode saying that overall it was still a very satisfying episode. "I’m just wondering what’s Kenya been up to. Wasn’t she dead? Stahma did kill her? I’m looking forward to seeing how Stahma reacts to this news that’s great for Amanda, but could surely mean trouble for Stahma."

Abbey White from Screen Spy gave a mixed review to the episode saying that even if it was not "bad" in any means, it felt disjointed. "It is clear we have reached the part of the second season where the writing is attempting to pull together the storylines from the first half and set up the second, however, it feels less like a transition and more like a scramble to put the pieces together."

Billy Grifter of Den of Geek gave a mixed review to the episode saying that the show took a turn for the worse this week. "Overall, this story was the first misstep I’ve detected this season, because Defiance has been getting progressively better as it has gone along. I’m hoping this is just an awkward chicane through which we can move on to better things that seem less designed to hold back information for no other reason than to reveal it later."

== Notes ==
The title of the episode comes from a poem of the Irish poet W. B. Yeats, The Second Coming. To the episode it refers to the "Arkrise" that Irzu talks about.
