= Put the Damage On =

- Defiance episode
- Episode no.: Season 2 Episode 5
- Directed by: Allan Kroeker
- Written by: Nevin Densham
- Original air date: July 17, 2014

Guest appearances
- Gale Harold (Connor Lang); Dewshane Williams (Tommy LaSalle); Trenna Keating (Doc Yewll); Nicole Muñoz (Christie Tarr); Kristina Pesic (Deirdre Lamb)

Episode chronology
← Previous "Beasts of Burden"	Next → "This Woman's Work"
- Defiance season 2

"Put the Damage On" is the fifth episode of the second season of the American science fiction series Defiance, and the series' seventeenth episode overall. It was aired on July 17, 2014. The episode was written by Nevin Densham and directed by Allan Kroeker.

== Plot ==
Amanda (Julie Benz) is at her home taking a bath when she hears a noise and goes to check on it. A masked man is in her room and attacks her but Amanda manages to fight him off and she throws him out of the window. She calls Nolan (Grant Bowler) and tells him about the attack and Nolan promises her that he will find out who the man was.

The next day, Amanda feels like someone is following her at the marketplace and when she turns around she sees Nolan. The two of them have a conversation where Nolan is really cruel to her telling her that he never cared about her or her sister and that both of them are incapable of love. He attacks her but Amanda escapes only to run into the real Nolan who is patrolling the city with Irisa (Stephanie Leonidas) and Tommy (Dewshane Williams) and she realizes that something is wrong.

Amanda rushes to Niles (James Murray) thinking that her hallucinations must be related to the adreno he is providing her but Niles reassures her that adreno is clean and sends her to stay at the McCawley house where she can be safe. Irisa and Tommy stay with her to protect her while Nolan tells her that he investigated her house after the attack and he did not find any evidence indicating that someone else was in the house except for her. He also found the adreno pipe but Amanda tells him that adreno does not cause hallucinations.

Later that night, Amanda hears some noises and Irisa and Tommy get out to check on it leaving Amanda alone with a gun. When Tommy gets back, Amanda hits him in the head and then shoots Irisa thinking that they are attackers. When she realizes that they are Tommy and Irisa, she runs away.

Nolan tries to talk to Niles about the adreno and him providing Amanda with it just to have her even if it is causing her all those troubles. While they are talking, Niles sees Connor Lang (Gale Harold), Amanda's ex fiancé, and follows him. Niles has a conversation with him telling him that he can not be there since he died a year ago, but Connor says that this is not true and attacks him reminding him of things from their past when they were at school and later in New York.

In the meantime, Amanda is at the Need/Want where she collapses and the people there call Nolan. Nolan finds out that there is an ego implant in the back of the neck that is killing her and is the cause of all her hallucinations. He immediately takes her to Doc Yewll's (Trenna Keating) office to remove the implant before it kills Amanda.

Meanwhile, Doc Yewll also has hallucinations of an old friend/lover named Lev (Hannah Cheesman). Lev appears to Yewll and tells her that she came back to ask for forgiveness because she is dying. During their conversations it is revealed that the two of them were working together during the Pale Wars and did some terrible things that led Lev to kill herself. Lev tries to convince Yewll to do the same but at the last moment Yewll changes her mind and goes back to her office where she finds Nolan trying to remove the implant from Amanda. She stops him and she removes it herself, saving Amanda's life.

In the rest of the episode, Datak (Tony Curran) goes to the Tarr house and performs a ritual in front of the whole family that will allow him to visit them. Christie (Nicole Muñoz) does not like the idea of Datak being around her child after what he did to Alak (Jesse Rath) and the whole family. She tells him so and then leaves the room. Later, she goes to the radio station to find Alak but he is not there and instead she sits with Deirdre (Kristina Pesic) and tells her that Alak's family will never accept her as their own despite all her efforts to learn their language and follow their customs. Deirdre tells her that she has to "live in their skin".

Datak asks Rafe (Graham Greene), who he finds living in the Tarr house since he was evicted from his own home, to talk to his family, especially Christie, and convince them to accept him back. Rafe does not seem willing to do it and Datak also tells him about his plan to take Defiance and the mines back from the E-Rep. He says that he works with the Votanis Collective and they will provide him with weapons for his cause.

At the end of the episode, it is revealed that the people who are behind the ego implant in Amanda's neck are Niles and Doc Yewll, who also have an implant of their own and that is why they were hallucinating as well. They did it to collect Amanda's memories and they managed to collect the last three weeks but it is unknown why they need them. Yewll removes the implant from Niles but she keeps hers, despite telling Niles that she had already removed and destroyed it.

== Feature music ==
In the "Put the Damage On" we can hear the song "In Spite of Me" by Morphine.

== Reception ==
=== Ratings ===
In its original American broadcast, "Put the Damage On" was watched by 1.64 million; slightly down by 0.01 from the previous episode.

=== Reviews ===
"Put the Damage In" received positive reviews.

Michael Ahr of Den of Geek rated the episode with 5/5 stating that the episode provided plenty of food for thought. "If you had told me last season that I would be looking forward this much to the next episode of Defiance each week, I wouldn’t have believed you. As the show nears the halfway point of its summer run, it’s exciting to see where things are headed."

Joe Winder from Geeked Out Nation rated the episode with 8/10 saying that overall was a good episode with a great story that built some of the characters of the show but it completely forgot other main characters, like Irisa's story. "Some of what we learned could be used for future stories. My main issue is the big story was forgotten by everyone and leave me wondering if it’s big deal why did Irisa just forget about it for a few days. I know if it was me I would be freaking out wondering what’s going on."

Billy Grifter of Den of Geek gave a good review to the episode stating that even none of the episodes so far were outstanding, they put a good base for the show's future. "While those behind Defiance haven’t hit a narrative home run yet this season, there have been many new subtle layers laid down inviting the possibility of delivering one. This was a strong story, and so far none of the episodes has been a complete fiasco."

Andrew Santos of With an Accent gave a good review to the episode saying that it was highly enjoyable. "The main story arc was weird and helped develop a few of the characters. [...] I liked the episode’s twist involving the ego. It would have been too cliché if we found out Amanda and Pottinger were just really high."

Mark Trammell from TV Equals also gave a good review to the episode saying that it was a decent one "even if it raised more questions than it answered".

Despite the positive reviews, Katelyn Barnes of Geeks Unleashed rated the episode with 6/10 saying that the whole ego storyline was a disappointment.
