= Bottom of the World (Defiance) =

- Defiance episode
- Episode no.: Season 2 Episode 10
- Directed by: Andy Wolk
- Written by: Anupam Nigam
- Original air date: August 21, 2014

Guest appearances
- Linda Hamilton (Pilar McCawley); Dewshane Williams (Tommy LaSalle); Nicole Muñoz (Christie Tarr); Anna Hopkins (Jessica "Berlin" Rainer); Noah Danby (Sukar); Justin Rain (Quentin McCawley); Kristina Pesic (Deirdre Lamb); Jane MacLean (Olfin Tennety); Douglas Nyback (Sgt. Frei Poole); America Olivo (Alethea)

Episode chronology
← Previous "Painted From Memory"	Next → "Doll Parts"
- Defiance season 2

"Bottom of the World" is the tenth episode of the second season of the American science fiction series Defiance, and the series' twenty-second episode overall. It was aired on August 21, 2014. The episode was written by Anupam Nigam and directed by Andy Wolk. The episode aired back-to-back with the next episode, "Doll Parts".

== Plot ==
Irisa (Stephanie Leonidas) steals a terrasphere from the E-Rep but Nolan (Grant Bowler) stops her before she escapes with it and returns the sphere to the E-Rep soldiers covering her. He asks her what is going on but Irisa does not want to tell him, so he cuffs her and takes her everywhere with him until he knows why she stole the sphere and what she wanted it for.

Alak (Jesse Rath) ends his relationship with Deirdre (Kristina Pesic), telling her that he loves Christie (Nicole Muñoz) and he wants to focus on his family and his child. He then returns home and asks Christie to forgive him for his behavior at the club. Christie accepts his apology and they make up. Later, Deirdre arrives to go to lunch with Christie and while Christie goes to get her purse, Alak makes it clear to Deirdre that the two of them are done. Deirdre does not like that and she tells him that she will keep fighting for him. Stahma (Jaime Murray) listens to Alak's conversation with Deirdre until Christie returns and the two girls leave.

Ambassador Tennety (Jane MacLean) arrives at Defiance to inspect the mines and Pottinger (James Murray) takes her for a tour of the mines along with Amanda (Julie Benz), Nolan, Irisa, and Berlin (Anna Hopkins). While there, an explosion happens and Tennety is killed, Pottinger and Amanda are trapped and the others manage to escape. Nolan calls Rafe (Graham Greene) to come and help with the rescue of Amanda while Irisa takes the opportunity to free herself and run away.

Nolan and Rafe come up with a plan to save Amanda and Pottinger as soon as possible, since the cave in which they are trapped will run out of air. While trying to do it, Nolan finds a Votan weapon and realizes that the explosion was not an accident but that someone planned it. He asks Rafe if he knows anything about it and Rafe says he will research it. Amanda and Pottinger become closer while trapped and they kiss before Nolan finds and rescues them.

Irisa finds Tommy (Dewshane Williams) and asks his help to get the terrasphere by telling him that the thing that is inside her is now killing her and she needs the terrasphere to save herself. Tommy believes her and steals the terrasphere for her. Stahma meets Datak (Tony Curran) and informs him about Deirdre being a problem for the family, asking him to take care of her. Datak refuses to take the money Stahma offers him and instead asks her to consider it as the price for him to return home. Stahma says she will take care of Deirdre herself.

Rafe asks Quentin's (Justin Rain) help to hide the weapons he has, because if Nolan finds out about them, he will believe that he was behind the explosion. When Rafe sees that one of the weapons is missing, he realizes that Quentin was the one behind it. Quentin explains that he did it under the orders of the Votanis Collective so he can get his mother back and then hits Rafe. Nolan arrives a little bit later and Quentin claims that his father confessed to him that he was the one who put the bomb in the mines to kill the Ambassador and when Rafe asked his help to hide the weapons and Quentin refused, Rafe became physical. Nolan does not believe Quentin's story and asks Rafe to tell him the truth but Rafe takes the blame to protect his son and Nolan arrests him.

After the death of the Ambassador, the Votanis Collective release Pilar (Linda Hamilton), Quentin's mother, who is happy to be back, and hopes they will finally be a family again with Rafe and her children. Quentin tells her that Rafe will not be with them since he framed his father for the Ambassador's death, something that Pilar does not like and she tells him that what he did was stupid.

The episode ends with Tommy bringing the terrasphere to Irisa and Irisa makes him part of her mission by "saving" him. She then proceeds to make the ritual for the Arkrise by using the terrasphere.

== Feature music ==
In the "Bottom of the World" we can hear the song "What's Up" by Lauren Tate.

== Reception ==
=== Ratings ===
In its original American broadcast, "Bottom of the World" was watched by 1.42 million; down by 0.16 from the previous episode.

=== Reviews ===
"Bottom of the World" received mixed reviews.

Kris from Movie Trailer Reviews gave the episode a B+ rating saying that the stories start to wrap up and come together but he thinks that killing Ambassador Tennety was a mistake and waste since the character was decent and with bigger potential.

Rowan Kaiser of The A.V. Club gave the episode a B− rating and commenting on both episodes (Bottom of the World and Doll Parts that aired the same night) says that the human motivation that was present in the second season so far, has largely been replaced by mythology. "This is a consistent disappointment thanks to the "resistance story" setup of the second season. The resistance story is powerful primarily because it accents the essential humanity of its major characters. The resistance is forced to compromise their ideals in order to achieve victory; those in power are forced to exert their essential humanity in the face of the issues of maintaining power. [...] Something still might happen to knock the E-Rep out, but it's no longer a built-up human story. And yes, I will almost always prefer a story based on human motivations to one based on mystery and mythology."

Michael Ahr from Den of Geek rated the episode with 4/5 saying that it was better to air the two episodes together because neither of the two episodes would have sarisfied on its own. "...the two [episodes] together felt like an intricate unfolding of relationships with a variety of changes for the principal characters to absorb and plenty of time to draw out the associated emotions."

Katelyn Barnes of Geeks Unleashed rated the episode with 6/10 commenting that Irisa's storyline is finally moving on but she "found the fallout surrounding Treasure Doll much more interesting" which took place in the second episode of the night.

Ashley Binion from The Nerd Machine rated the episode with 2.5/5 commenting that the two episodes "needed to be seen consecutively as neither episode was particularly excellent on its own". About Bottom of the World she says that altogether was a forgettable episode.

Billy Grifter of Den of Geek commented that the episode ended with two points of interest; the arrival of Rafe's bi-polar wife who appears more rational than expected and the unleash of the terrasphere by Irisa.
