= Wake (2003 film) =

- Directed by: Henry LeRoy Finch
- Written by: Henry LeRoy Finch
- Produced by: Susan Landau Finch
- Starring: Gale Harold; Dihlon McManne; Blake Gibbons; John Winthrop Philbrick
- Cinematography: Patrick Kelly
- Edited by: Gus Carpenter
- Music by: Chris Anderson; Henry LeRoy Finch
- Production companies: Fictionworks Production; Wildwell Films
- Distributed by: Newmark/Echelon Entertainment Group
- Release dates: November 15, 2003 (Queens Film Festival); May 28, 2004 (U.S.)
- Running time: 94 minutes
- Country: United States
- Language: English

Wake is a 2003 American drama film directed by Henry LeRoy Finch, starring Gale Harold, Dihlon McManne, Blake Gibbons and John Winthrop Philbrick.

== Cast ==
- Gale Harold as Kyle Riven
- Dihlon McManne as Sebastien Riven
  - Martin Landau as Older Sebastien Riven
- Blake Gibbons as Raymond Riven
- John Winthrop Philbrick as Jack Riven
- Muriel Kenderdine as Mother
- Dusty Paik as April
- Rainer Judd as Dusty

== Release ==
The film opened on 28 May 2004.

== Reception ==
Maitland McDonagh of the TV Guide rated the film 3 stars out of 5 and wrote, "Its assets include uniformly strong performances; Gibbons and Harold revel in the showy roles, and get strong support from McManne and Philbrick. Even Paik and Judd invest their one-note roles with surprising vividness. Shooting on digital video, cinematographer Patrick Kelly delivers a vibrantly smeary look that evokes alternately sordid and surreally beautiful flashes of poisonously intoxicated memory." Ronnie Scheib of Variety wrote that "Strong thesping and solid staging, atmospherically accompanied by disorienting, darkly folksy Ramsay Midwood songs make “Wake” surprisingly watchable for a film whose whole raison d’etre appears to be something of a mystery."

Noel Murray of The A.V. Club wrote that the film "looks great and sounds great—apart from what the people in it do and say." Dave Kehr of The New York Times wrote that the film was "instantly forgettable". Chuck Wilson of LA Weekly wrote that "one feels sympathy for the ensemble, which, absent full-bodied characters to inhabit, mug furiously, as if big gestures conjure big themes." Ben Kenigsberg of The Village Voice wrote a negative review of the film.
