= Ken Danby =

Canadian painter (1940–2007)

- Born: Kenneth Edison Danby; 6 March 1940; Sault Ste. Marie, Ontario
- Died: 23 September 2007 (aged 67); Algonquin Park, Ontario
- Education: Ontario College of Art
- Style: Photorealism
- Movement: Realism
- Spouse(s): Judy Harcourt (1965-1984); Gillian Rumble (1985-2007)
- Children: 3 plus 2 step-children
- Awards: Order of Canada; Order of Ontario; Queen Elizabeth II Silver Jubilee Medal; Queen Elizabeth II Golden Jubilee Medal; 125th Anniversary of the Confederation of Canada Medal; Doctor of Fine Arts, honoris causa, Laurentian University
- Elected: Royal Canadian Academy of Arts
- Website: https://kendanbyart.ca

Ken Danby, CM OOnt RCA DFA (Hon.) (6 March 1940 – 23 September 2007) was a Canadian painter known for highly realistic paintings that study everyday life. Danby encouraged Canadians to identify with their natural and cultural heritage. His portraits, and realistic interpretations of farm and rural life, and sport, had a strong and positive effect on Canadian art and he is recognized as Canada’s finest painter in watercolour.

== Early life and education ==
Danby was born and raised in Sault Ste. Marie, Ontario, the younger of two sons of Edison Danby, a public servant, and his wife Gertrude Buckley. He began drawing and painting at age ten and after graduating from Sault Collegiate Institute in 1958, enrolled at the Ontario College of Art, where he studied under Jock Macdonald. After two years, he quit school to experiment on his own, while working a TV set designer and as a commercial artist for the Toronto Telegram.

== Career ==
Danby experimented with abstract expressionism but a visit to a 1962 exhibition of the work of Andrew Wyeth inspired him to focus on realism and photorealism, and to develop his skill with watercolour. While he also worked in acrylic and oil, his best-known works are in the challenging medium of egg-tempera. He was a prolific serigrapher and lithographer and worked on a large scale, with the width of some panels exceeding four feet.

In August 1961, Danby participated in the first Toronto Outdoor Art Fair, winning the "Best in Show" prize with an untitled abstract. In 1963, his first egg-tempera, Fur and Bricks, won the Jessie Dow Prize at the Spring Exhibition at the Montreal Museum of Fine Arts. At his first solo exhibition in 1964, all paintings were sold. In the mid- to late-1960s, he was an art director for the Mariposa Folk Festival, and part owner of a folk music club in Yorkville. In 1968, his painting of then-Prime Minister Pierre Trudeau was on the cover of Time magazine.

In 1975, Danby was elected to the Royal Canadian Academy of Arts and, in 1976, was the first recipient of the National Sport and Recreation Centre's R. Tait McKenzie Chair for Sport. By this time he had conquered his feeling that sports was not a subject for a serious artist. He was awarded the Royal Canadian Mint commission for the four commemorative Series Three: Early Canadian Sports coins for the 1976 Summer Olympics in Montreal. He was also commissioned by the National Hockey League to paint portraits of players such as Gordie Howe, Tim Horton and Wayne Gretzky, although his most famous hockey-related works are Lacing Up (1973) and At the Crease (1972), which was created in recognition of the milestone Canada vs Russia Summit Series. A statue replicating the painting now stands in the Hockey Hall of Fame.

In 1983, Danby painted a number of watercolours to support Canada One, Canada's entry in the America's Cup, for which he spent a summer in Newport, Rhode Island, sailing on the Canada One. He then did a series of paintings of Canadian athletes at the 1984 Winter Olympics in Sarajevo. In 1982, he was received by Ronald Reagan at the White House to celebrate the opening of the exhibition Champions of American Sport at the American National Portrait Gallery, which included At the Crease. That year, at Rideau Hall, the Governor General of Canada Edward Schreyer accepted Danby's portrait of Terry Fox, which he donated to the people of Canada.

In 1998, Toronto’s Joseph D. Carrier Art Gallery presented Ken Danby: New Paintings. Ten thousand people attended the exhibition and, in four weeks, a Canadian sales record was set for new work by a living artist.

From 1964 onward, Danby was represented by Gallery Moos in Toronto. He lived and painted on a 50-acre rural property near Guelph, Ontario, and spent years restoring the historic Armstrong Mill; some of his art work features the property. He designed a mechanized easel to orientate his painting surface towards the changing conditions of natural light, and he self-published four books: Ken Danby: New Paintings (1998), The Great Farewell, The Creation of Wayne Gretzky's Official Retirement Portrait (2001), Sky & Water: Ken Danby Landscapes (2002), and Land, Water & Light: Ken Danby Landscapes (2004). Danby's work is collected internationally and is held in the permanent collections of many public institutions, including the Museum of Modern Art, the Brooklyn Museum, the National Gallery of Canada, the Art Institute of Chicago, the Montreal Museum of Fine Art, the Oklahoma Contemporary Arts Center, the Vancouver Art Gallery, and Bradford's Cartwright Hall.

== Honors ==
Danby's awards include the Queen Elizabeth II Silver Jubilee Medal (1977), the 125th Anniversary of the Confederation of Canada Medal (1992), an Honorary Doctorate of Fine Arts from Laurentian University (1997), the Order of Ontario (2001), the Order of Canada (2001), and the Queen Elizabeth II Golden Jubilee Medal (2002). He also served on the boards of the Canada Council for the Arts, and the National Gallery of Canada.

The City of Sault Ste. Marie honoured him through its Award of Merit, and by naming Ken Danby Way after him. He was inducted into the Sault's Walk of Fame in 2006. A school in Guelph is named after him. In 2016, the Art Gallery of Hamilton organized a retrospective of Danby's work, entitled Beyond the Crease. That year, the Guelph Civic Museum presented Ken Danby: Five Decades, an exhibition which included his Gretzky portrait, The Great Farewell.

== Personal life and death ==
Many of Danby's early works were of scenes set on St. Joseph Island. It was there that Danby met his first wife, Judy Harcourt. The couple married in 1965. They had three sons, including actor Noah Danby, and divorced in 1984.

In 1985, Danby married Gillian Rumble, his muse and model.

On 23 September 2007, while on a canoe trip in Algonquin Park near North Tea Lake, Danby died of a heart attack, age 67.
