= Bottom of the World =

Bottom of the World may refer to:

== Locations ==
- The Mariana Trench, specifically the Challenger Deep
- Antarctica, specifically the South Pole
- Anywhere on the Southern Hemisphere
- Australia, see Down Under

== Media ==
- Bottom of the World (film), a 2017 film
- "Bottom of the World" (Defiance), the tenth episode of the second season of the American science fiction series Defiance
- "Bottom of the World", a song by Tom Waits
