= In My Secret Life (Defiance) =

- Defiance episode
- Episode no.: Season 2 Episode 2
- Directed by: Michael Nankin
- Written by: Michael Taylor
- Original air date: June 26, 2014

Guest appearances
- Dewshane Williams (Tommy LaSalle); Trenna Keating (Doc Yewll); Nicole Muñoz (Christie Tarr); Anna Hopkins (Jessica "Berlin" Rainer); Ryan Kennedy (Josef); Douglas Nyback (Sgt. Frei Poole)

Episode chronology
← Previous "The Opposite of Hallelujah"	Next → "The Cord and the Ax"
- Defiance season 2

"In My Secret Life" is the second episode of the second season of the American science fiction series Defiance, and the series' fourteenth episode overall. It was aired on June 26, 2014. The episode was written by Michael Taylor and directed by Michael Nankin.

== Plot ==
Nolan (Grant Bowler) and Irisa (Stephanie Leonidas) arrive at Defiance and they have to get through the checkpoint before they get into the town, where they are confronted with Berlin (Anna Hopkins), an E-Rep officer. Berlin takes Nolan's guns and Irisa's knives, but when she takes Irisa's diary, Irisa fights back to take it from her and she ends up in Defiance's jail. Nolan tries to get her out and goes to talk to the new mayor leaving Tommy (Dewshane Williams) to keep an eye on Irisa.

Niles (James Murray) meets Stahma (Jaime Murray) at the marketplace and asks her to shut down her drug business with the "Blue Devil" because, as he claims, his officers are getting addicted to it and they cause incidents. Stahma tries to explain that he can not do it but when Niles threatens to release Datak (Tony Curran), she agrees to do it. Niles leaves and asks to bring the already existent stock of "Blue Devil" to his office.

Irisa and Tommy are alone waiting for her release and they get the chance to talk. Tommy says that he has moved on since the day Irisa disappeared without saying a word and Irisa promises him that as soon as she gets out, she will tell him everything that is happening to her.

Nolan goes to the mayor's office to talk to Niles and finds Amanda (Julie Benz) also there. While he is trying to talk to Niles, an explosion in the marketplace interrupts him and they all go to see what happened. Nolan recognizes the type of explosive—a shrill bomb—and tells Niles and Amanda about it. Amanda convinces Niles to let Nolan track down the bomber and earn Irisa's freedom. Niles gives Nolan 24 hours to do it.

Nolan knows that shrill bugs can be found in cold, dark places, and he heads to the mines. There, Josef (Ryan Kennedy) tells him that Bradley Wittle (Chadwick Allen) was gathering the shrills, and Nolan heads to the Need/Want to wait for him to appear. While he waits, Amanda tells him all that has happened in town since he left.

Bradley appears and Nolan starts chasing him when Bradley realizes that Nolan knows about him and runs for it. Nolan loses Bradley, but with Berlin's help tracks him to Skevur's (Michael Dyson) place. Nolan gets there to find out that there is another bomb ready to explode and forces Skevur tell him where the second bomb is. Skevur confess that it is attached to Stahma's car and Nolan runs to find it. When he gets there, he pulls Stahma out of the car and disarms the bomb, gaining back the trust and approval of the people of Defiance.

Stahma thanks Nolan and when she gets home, she blames Alak (Jesse Rath) for what happened to her, saying that Skevur tried to kill her because he could not handle him properly, which he must do now. Alak goes and finds Skevur; after a brief fight, he kills him.

Once freed, Irisa runs to find Tommy to tell him what she promised him, but she sees him kissing Berlin and leaves without saying anything. Meanwhile, at the Need/Want, Niles offers Nolan the job of Lawkeeper back, but Nolan declines. Amanda follows him and convinces him to accept the job. Later, they end up in her room having sex, with Niles watching the whole thing from the spy camera he has planted in Amanda's room.

In the meantime, Datak and Doc Yewll (Trenna Keating) try to organize their escape from the E-Rep prison camp. They recruit a religious fanatic to kill Niles on one of his visits. Niles comes and hauls Yewll in for an interrogation, asking about the safe she has in her office. Yewll refuses to answer his questions, and Niles has man cut off one of her fingers.

On his way out, Niles gets attacked by the religious fanatic, but Datak runs to his rescue and saves Niles' life by killing the man. Datak asks to be released from prison in return for saving the mayor, but Niles refuses, suspecting that Datak was probably behind the whole thing from the beginning.

== Feature music ==
In the "In My Secret Life" we can hear the songs:

- "On Every Street" by Dire Straits
- "Heavy Fuel" by Dire Straits

== Reception ==
=== Ratings ===
In its original American broadcast, "In My Secret Life" was watched by 1.43 million; down 0.58 from the previous episode.

=== Reviews ===
"In My Secret Life" received positive reviews.

Rowan Kaiser of The A.V. Club gave the episode a B+ rating saying that it was focused on a terrorist bomber but that served well to Irisa and Nolan's return to Defiance. "It gets the job done well enough, setting the board up for the entire season. This is necessary work, and it’s accomplished well. But the biggest stride forward is that Defiance demonstrates that it understands itself, its nominal main character, and how it can subvert expectations using its revamped setting."

Noel Kirkpatrick from TV.com gave a good review to the episode saying that after two episodes, the second season of the show seems more interesting than the first one. "With Pottinger and Berlin established and Nolan back in the Lawkeeper headquarters, I expect that the story may begin to speed up a bit".

Billy Grifter of Den of Geek also gave a good review stating that after a bumpy start, the show is quickly on track towards an interesting second season.

Ricky Riley from The Celebrity Cafe gave a good review as well saying that overall the episode was great. "Everyone has moved into different roles except for Nolan. The town was once a free-city with hope and prosperity. Now it is a police-state right out of a dystopian novel and Nolan is the only thing that has remained constant."
