= All Things Must Pass (Defiance) =

- Defiance episode
- Episode no.: Season 2 Episode 12
- Directed by: Michael Nankin
- Written by: Todd Slavkin; Darren Swimmer
- Original air date: August 28, 2014

Guest appearances
- Linda Hamilton (Pilar McCawley); Dewshane Williams (Tommy LaSalle); Trenna Keating (Doc Yewll); Nicole Muñoz (Christie Tarr); Justin Rain (Quentin McCawley); Anna Hopkins (Jessica "Berlin" Rainer); Douglas Nyback (Sgt. Frei Poole); Robin Dunne (Cai)

Episode chronology
← Previous "Doll Parts"	Next → "I Almost Prayed"
- Defiance season 2

"All Things Must Pass" is the twelfth episode of the second season of the American science fiction series Defiance, and the series' twenty-fourth episode overall. It was aired on August 28, 2014. The episode was written by Todd Slavkin & Darren Swimmer and directed by Michael Nankin. The episode aired back-to-back with the next episode, "I Almost Prayed".

== Plot ==
The episode starts with Stahma (Jaime Murray) and Datak (Tony Curran), who have spent the night together, discussing about Datak coming back home. Stahma tells him her rules to accept him back and Datak agrees until he hears that she wants to be a partner in the family business. Datak asks her to leave. When someone knocks at his door, he opens it, thinking it is Stahma, and is kidnapped by a stranger. Stahma is also kidnapped on her way back home and the two of them wake up in an abandoned silo, tied up.

Nolan (Grant Bowler) continues to drag the injured Tommy (Dewshane Williams) on the sleigh, trying to get him back to Defiance in time for someone to take care of his wound. On their way, Tommy tells Nolan about Cai (Robin Dunne) and that Irisa (Stephanie Leonidas) asked him to kill Cai if they see him. Nolan realizes that Irisa is afraid of Cai because somehow the two of them are linked and he can destroy her plan.

Doc Yewll (Trenna Keating) continues to hide so she will not get arrested and the illusion of Lev (Hannah Cheesman) keeps her company. The two of them find out about Irisa's plan and Yewll decides to stop hiding and go back to Defiance to inform everyone about it and tell them how they can stop Irisa. Lev tries to stop her and convince her that what Irisa doing is for the best. Yewll realizes that the artificial intelligence of the Ark has taken over Lev and she removes the ego device from her neck while saying goodbye to Lev. She then heads back to Defiance to help with stopping Irisa.

Pilar (Linda Hamilton) visits Rafe (Graham Greene) in prison before she meets Christie (Nicole Muñoz). Rafe wants to be sure that Pilar is now fine for the sake of their children and she assures him that she has never been better. Quentin (Justin Rain) takes Pilar to meet Christie and the two of them reunite.

Amanda (Julie Benz) and Pottinger (James Murray) have a dinner together and Pottinger tells Amanda that he has a surprise for her. He takes her to the place where Stahma and Datak are locked and tells her that he found Kenya's murderers. Pottinger leaves her alone with the Tarrs giving her his gun and the chance for revenge. Stahma confess that she killed Kenya and Amanda is ready to shoot her but she changes her mind and does not do it. Amanda gets out of the silo and is mad at Pottinger for thinking that she would do something like that and she tells him that they should find another way to bring the Tarrs to justice.

After Amanda leaves, Datak agrees to Stahma's rules and she agrees to let him come back home. Before going back home, they go to find the three men who betrayed them to Pottinger. Using the poison Stahma used to kill Kenya, they kill the three men.

Nolan finally gets back to Defiance but it is too late for Tommy. Berlin (Anna Hopkins) asks Nolan who did this and he tells her that it was Irisa but Irisa is not being herself. In the meantime, Irisa proceeds with her plan and by using stones and dirt, she controls the Arks that are in space and leads them to New York. She destroys and terraforms the city while Nolan goes to find Cai, the only person who can stop Irisa.

== Featured Music ==
In the "All Things Must Pass" we can hear the song "Satan Your Kingdom Must Come Down" by Robert Plant.

== Reception ==
=== Ratings ===
In its original American broadcast, "All Things Must Pass" was watched by 1.35 million; down by 0.15 from the previous episode.

=== Reviews ===
"All Things Must Pass" received mixed reviews.

Rowan Kaiser from The A.V. Club gave the episode an A rating and commenting on both episodes (All Things Must Pass and I Almost Prayed that aired the same night) said that this was what he wanted from the show and that the last two episodes were better than Defiance has ever been.

"The potentially complex characterization of the entire season was turned into actual characterization here. [...] Meanwhile, the mythology that’s been hovering over the entire season regained its connection to Irisa’s characterization, and gave its apparent world-shattering effects the visual/musical power to justify the supposed threat."

Katelyn Barnes of Geeks Unleashed rated the episode with 8/10 saying that both episodes worked hand in hand bringing Season Two to a satisfying if not convenient close.

"Altogether, I thought these last two episodes were a much stronger finale than last year’s, and with all the surprising twists and dramatic and dark character growth, matched the overall improvement of Defiance these past few months."

Michael Ahr from Den of Geek rated the episode with 4/5 saying that the finale of the season "has us hoping for Season 3" and he says that he is duly impressed by the whole second season.

"While not a flawless ending to season 2, both episodes together had some killer character moments and truly excellent special effects (Bear McCreary’s epic music didn’t hurt either) that left me craving a renewal for Syfy’s flagship series."

Andrew Santos from With an Accent gave a good review to the episode saying that it was a good one but very somber which served as a much needed breather before the finale.

Billy Grifter of Den of Geek gave a mixed review to the last two episodes saying that the finale was unsatisfying and the show hasn't found its feet. About All Things Must Pass, Grifter said that the episode had diversions and weaknesses.
