= This Woman's Work (Defiance) =

- Defiance episode
- Episode no.: Season 2 Episode 6
- Directed by: Allan Arkush
- Written by: Brian Allen Alexander
- Original air date: July 24, 2014

Guest appearances
- Dewshane Williams (Tommy LaSalle); Nicole Muñoz (Christie Tarr); Anna Hopkins (Jessica "Berlin" Rainer); Kristina Pesic (Deirdre Lamb); William Atherton (Viceroy Mercado)

Episode chronology
← Previous "Put the Damage On"	Next → "If You Could See Her Through My Eyes"
- Defiance season 2

"This Woman's Work" is the sixth episode of the second season of the American science fiction series Defiance, and the series' eighteenth episode overall. It was aired on July 24, 2014. The episode was written by Brian Allen Alexander and directed by Allan Arkush.

== Plot ==
Viceroy Mercado (William Atherton) returns to Defiance to inform Niles (James Murray) about the coming Arkfall and that he wants him to go with a team, Nolan (Grant Bowler) included, to retrieve an energy source from the Ark. Nolan and Niles get ready to go with the team when Tommy (Dewshane Williams) comes to join them with Berlin (Anna Hopkins). When Nolan asks Tommy where Irisa (Stephanie Leonidas) is, Tommy says that since Irisa and Berlin do not get along, Berlin will come with them while Irisa stays back. Nolan does not like the idea and tells Tommy that he is not going with them either, causing Tommy to quit his job. Berlin convinces Tommy to leave Defiance with her and sign up with the E-Rep in Texas.

Nolan and Niles get to the fallen Ark along with Churchill (Rob Archer) and an E-Rep soldiers unit. The three of them go inside the Ark to search it and Nolan realizes that the Ark was never a refueling ship but a Gulanee transport vessel. One Gulanee has survived the crash, and the three of them rush out to return to the unit only to find all aboard dead. They return to the Ark, where they are trapped inside the ship while Nolan tries to create a weapon that will kill the Gulanee and save their lives. Nolan needs some extra time and asks Niles to distract the Gulanee. Niles sends Churchill outside on a suicide attack to give Nolan the extra time he needs. The Gulanee kills Churchill, but when it gets into the ship, Nolan's jury-rigged weapon kills it.

Nolan and Niles return to Defiance, but Mercado is displeased with how the mission went and orders Niles to go to the Dakota Reach as a punishment, while the Viceroy will take over the town.

Tommy wants to talk to Irisa about him leaving Defiance and he follows her while she skulks after a Castithan man. He sees her during the moment that Irzu takes over her body, and he believes that she has killed the Castithan. Irisa tells him that she did not and she convinces him to wait and see that the man will wake up and be fine. She tells him everything she knows about what is going on with her and he promises to keep her secret and try to help her. When Tommy tells Berlin that he can not leave because Irisa needs him, but not why, Berlin breaks up with him.

Stahma (Jaime Murray) faces some problems with the holy man, Favi Kurr (Dominic Cuzzocrea), who tells her that her actions will cause problems to their community. Because of her, many Casti women might forget their place and start asking for more power or better treatment from their husbands. Stahma talks to Amanda about it, and Amanda advises her to talk to the other Castithan women. Stahma meets with some of them, but the other women make it clear that they will not support her in what she is trying to do. Since her attempt to convince the other women has failed, she realizes she cannot let them live to tell anyone what she is up to, so she poisons them and frames Favi Kurr for the crime. As a result, Kurr ends up on the shaming rack and is killed.

At the end of the episode, Deirdre (Kristina Pesic) helps Christie (Nicole Muñoz) to get "into the skin" of the Castithans by putting makeup and a wig on her and dressing her like them. Mercado does the same at his home, and the two of them meet at a local Castithan club where Mercado starts flirting with Christie, not knowing who she is. Nolan and Berlin get together after her breakup with Tommy, since Amanda has ignored him to console Niles about his being sent to Dakota Reach.

== Feature music ==
In the "This Woman's Work" we can hear the song "Lonely Nights" by Olivia Pucci.

== Reception ==
=== Ratings ===
In its original American broadcast, "This Woman's Work" was watched by 1.61 million; slightly down by 0.03 from the previous episode.

=== Reviews ===
"This Woman's Work" received positive reviews.

Michael Ahr from Den of Geek rated the episode with 4.5/5 saying that the episode was another roller coaster ride. "Defiance has been non-stop entertainment this year, and the deck just got another shuffle. Relationships shift, secrets are revealed, and new ones are glimpsed only by the viewers, giving us tantalizing morsels to keep us hungering for more."

Joe Winder of Geeked Out Nation rated the episode with 8.8/10 saying that it was a pretty good episode that moved things along. "In all it was a good episode and we learned interesting things about some of the characters. [...] Never thought Niles was so caring and he even was remorseful about what he did to Churchill. Never would have guessed that Viceroy was an Irathient wanna be. The most shocking thing in this episode is the conversation where Irisa spilled to Tommy that she had no clue what was happening."

Katelyn Barnes from Geeks Unleashed rated the episode with 8.5/10 saying that this was one of her favorite episodes of the show so far.

Rowan Kaiser of The A.V. Club gave a B rating to the episode saying that the episode is not great "but it is a great example of how a science fiction show can take advantage of its setting in order to produce an entirely normal episode." Kaiser also states that the main story of the episode with Nolan and Pottinger, gives the show the opportunity to delve into Pottinger’s character a little bit more.

Billy Grifter from Den of Geek gave a good review to the episode saying that it was his favorite of the season so far and that the end of the episode was an unexpected turn of events. "[The end of the episode] is an odd direction to take the show, but anything unexpected is generally good, if it all makes sense."

Andrew Santos of With an Accent also gave a good review to the episode saying that it was another solid episode for the show. "This second season continues to surprise me. While the first season felt more like a fun and sometimes goofy science fiction series, this second season has really explored the characters, new and old, in ways I wouldn’t have thought. Hopefully Defiance keeps this momentum going."
