= Best of the Worst =

Best of the Worst may refer to:

- Best of the Worst (game show), a 2006 British panel game TV show
- The Best of the Worst, a 1991–1992 American TV show
- Best of the Worst (web series), by Red Letter Media
- Best of the Worst: 93–97, a 1999 compilation album by the Oblivians
