= Gale Harold =

American actor (born 1969)

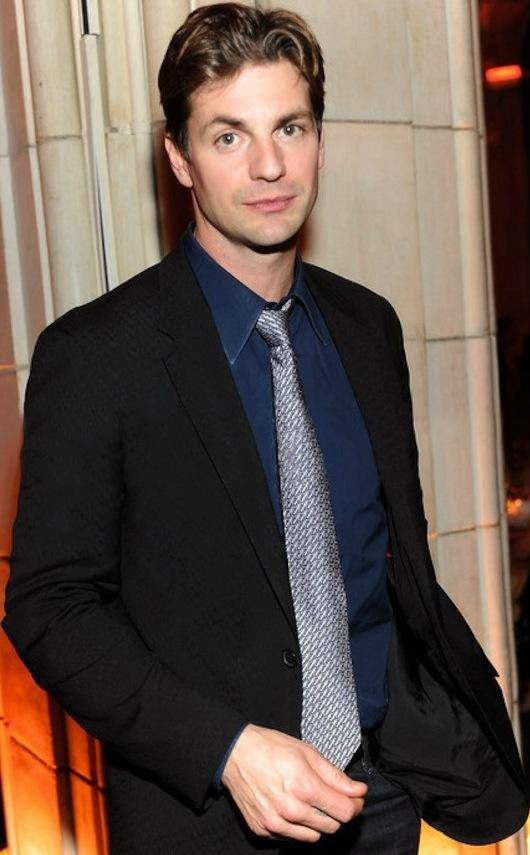
- Harold in September 2012
- Born: Gale Morgan Harold III; July 10, 1969 (age 57); Atlanta, Georgia, U.S.
- Education: American University
- Occupation: Actor
- Years active: 2000–2022

Gale Morgan Harold III (born July 10, 1969) is an American actor, known for his leading and recurring roles on Queer as Folk, Deadwood, Desperate Housewives, Grey's Anatomy, The Secret Circle and Defiance. He also starred in the romantic comedy Falling for Grace.

== Early life ==
Harold was born in Atlanta, Georgia. His father was an engineer and his mother a real estate agent. Because Harold's parents were devout Pentecostals, he had strict religious upbringing. At age 15, he left the church.

Following graduation from the Lovett School, Harold attended American University in Washington, D.C., on a soccer scholarship. He began a Liberal Arts degree in romance literature, departing after a few months and moved to San Francisco, California to study photography at the San Francisco Art Institute. He worked a variety of jobs including construction, bartender, waiter, and apprentice motorcycle mechanic.

In 1997, Susan Landau, daughter of actor Martin Landau, suggested Harold try acting. He dropped out of the San Francisco Art Institute and relocated to Los Angeles, where he began a three-year period of intensive drama study. He was accepted into the Actors Conservatory Program with the classical theater company A Noise Within. In his theatrical debut, Harold appeared as "Bunny" in Gillian Plowman's Me and My Friends.

== Career ==
In 2000, Harold was cast as Brian Kinney, a central character on Showtime's popular gay drama Queer as Folk.

During the summer hiatus from Queer as Folk, Harold made his New York theatrical debut in Uncle Bob along with George Morfogen.

In 2003, Harold starred in Wake, produced by Susan Landau Finch and directed by her husband Henry LeRoy Finch.

Harold had the lead role of Special Agent Graham Kelton in the short-lived FOX series Vanished in 2006.

Harold also guest-starred as Wyatt Earp in two episodes of the HBO series Deadwood and appeared twice on the CBS series The Unit. Alongside David Bowie, Harold was an associate producer of the documentary Scott Walker: 30 Century Man.

Gale Harold returned to the New York stage in Tennessee Williams' play Suddenly Last Summer on November 15, 2006, in the role of Dr. Cukrowicz ("Dr. Sugar"). Harold's co-stars in the Roundabout Theatre repertory production, a limited Off-Broadway engagement running through January 20, 2007, were Blythe Danner and Carla Gugino.

Harold was the male lead in the indie romantic comedy Falling for Grace, which debuted favorably at the 2006 Tribeca Film Festival (under the working title East Broadway). Harold played an eligible New York bachelor in an interracial relationship with an Asian-American woman.

Harold appeared in November 2007 in a guest role on ABC's Grey's Anatomy as Shane, a paramedic and white supremacist who is injured in an ambulance crash.

He appeared in Desperate Housewives on the fourth season finale May 18, 2008 as Jackson Braddock, Susan Mayer's love interest. Six months after a serious motorcycle accident, Harold returned to play Jackson on the May 3, 2009 episode of the show.

In January and February 2010, Harold performed alongside Denise Crosby and ex-model Claudia Mason in Tennessee Williams' Orpheus Descending at Theater/Theatre in Los Angeles. The production and cast received mostly positive reviews, with the Los Angeles Times calling his performance "brilliant" and adding "Harold, ideally cast, beautifully ignites with Crosby, whose unconventional interpretation is an affecting revelation."

In July 2010, it was announced at the Television Critics Association Summer Tour that Harold had accepted a recurring role as a law professor in the upcoming series Hellcats. The series concluded its season with Harold's character involved in an affair with the show's lead character Marti (played by Aly Michalka). The series was cancelled after one season.

The CW picked up The Secret Circle for the fall of 2011. The series revolved around a coven of teenage witches in a small town in Washington, each a member of a different witch clan dating back to the 17th Century. Harold played a scheming and powerful male witch who is the father of one of the teenagers. On May 11, 2012, The CW announced the cancellation of the series.

In 2011, Harold was also featured in two movies, Low Fidelity and Rehab, as one of the main characters.

Harold appeared on three episodes of the first season of the show Defiance (1.06, 1.08 and 1.09). On May 10, 2013, Syfy renewed Defiance for a 13 episode second season to air in 2014. Harold returned for a guest appearance in the second season of the show in the episode "Put the Damage On".

In 2013, Harold appeared in a short film, The Spirit Game. The film had its world premiere at the Cannes Film Festival and it was released online on September 2, 2014.

At the Rise 'n Shine Convention (June 9, 2013), Harold said that he was currently working on a project about Civil War, Field of Lost Shoes.

In 2014, Harold participated in different projects including the short film, Thirst, which was directed by Rachel McDonald and premiered at the Locarno Film Festival in Switzerland on August 7, 2014, and the film Echo Park, which premiered in the LA Film Festival on June 14, 2014. He also appeared in the sci-fi/action movie Andron.

In 2020, Harold became a co-founder of Filmmakers First Fund, a Los Angeles-based film fund and studio space dedicated to artists with full-length narrative and documentary film projects in the early stages of development. 2020 grantees included Rachel Lears for To the End (2022), a documentary following Alexandria Ocasio-Cortez, Rhiana Gunn-Wright, Varshini Prakash, and Alexandra Rojas as they fight for the Green New Deal.

== Personal life ==
On October 14, 2008, Harold was hospitalized at the LAC+USC Medical Center after a motorcycle accident. He remained in critical condition after swelling of the brain was discovered as well as a fractured shoulder. Harold was subsequently released from intensive care and returned to complete his role on Desperate Housewives. The online motorcycle publication Clutch & Chrome, which had followed his recovery closely, celebrated his new Hellcats role with an article on August 3, 2010.

During the shootings of Vanished in 2006, Harold shot a short video for the Amber Watch Foundation showing his support about missing children. In the video he stated that "nationwide 1.3 million children go missing each year" and urged people to be champions for child safety.

Harold is a supporter of the LGBT community. On July 16, 2012, at the first Annual Hot 100 Party hosted by the website AfterEllen, he recorded an It Gets Better video sending his message and advising gay teens to remember their heroes.

In 2014, Harold filed a restraining order against his ex-girlfriend, actress Danielle Saklofsky.

Harold was among the members of the Queer as Folk cast who refused to discuss their sexuality in the early years of the show's release. He later disclosed that he is heterosexual.

== Credits ==
=== Film ===
Year	Title	Role	Notes
2000	36K	Booker O'Brien	
2001	Mental Hygiene	David Ryan	Short film
2003	Particles of Truth	Morrison Wiley	
2003	Rhinoceros Eyes	Det. Phil Barbara	
2003	Wake	Kyle Riven	
2005	The Unseen	Harold	
2005	Fathers and Sons	Elliott	
2005	Life on the Ledge	Chaz	
2006	Falling for Grace	Andrew James Barrington Jr.	
2007	Scott Walker: 30 Century Man		Associate producer Documentary film
2009	Passenger Side	Karl	
2010	Fertile Ground	Nate Weaver	
2011	Low Fidelity	Ted	
2011	Rehab	Dr. Daniel Brody	Post-production
2013	The Spirit Game	Reggie	Short film
2013	Cafe Attitude	Waiter	Short film
2013	The Being Experience (In the Woods)		Post-production
2014	Field of Lost Shoes	Charles Semple	Premiered on April 13, 2014
2014	Thirst	John	Short film; premiered on August 7, 2014
2014	In my mirror		Post-production - Documentary
2014	Echo Park	Simon	Premiered on June 14, 2014
2014	The Two Dogs	Max Middlefinger	Post-production
2014	Andron: The Black Labyrinth		World Premiere, November 8, 2015, at "Trieste Science + Fiction", Italy
2015	Mari Celeste	Jeremy	Short film; Post-production
2015	The Green Bench	Father	Short film
2015	Kiss Me, Kill Me	Stephen	World Premiere, September 18, 2015, at "The Chicago Gay and Lesbian Film Festival"
2015	Weepah Way for Now	Theatrical Agent	Premiered on June 16, 2015, in L.A. Film Festival
2018	The Betrothed	Eric	Short film
2022	Good Girl Jane	Elliott Rosen	

=== TV ===
Year	Title	Role	Notes
2000–05	Queer as Folk	Brian Kinney	Main cast (Seasons 1–5)
2003	Street Time	Geoff Beddoes	Episode 2.08: Gone; Episode 2.09: Get Up, Stand Up
2003	Law & Order: Special Victims Unit	Dr. Garrett Lang	Episode 4.24: "Perfect"
2005	Fathers and Sons	Elliott	Television film
2005	Martha: Behind Bars	Peter Bacanovic	Television film
2006	The Unit	Rory	Episode 1.07: "Dedication"; Episode 1.10: "Unannounced"
2006	Deadwood	Wyatt Earp	Episode 3.08: "Leviathan Smiles"; Episode 3.09: "Amateur Night"
2006	Vanished	Agent Graham Kelton	Main cast (Episodes 1–7); 8 episodes
2007	Grey's Anatomy	Shane	Episode 4.09: "Crash Into Me, Part 1"; Episode 4.10: "Crash Into Me, Part 2"
2008–09	Desperate Housewives	Jackson Braddock	14 episodes (4.17, 5.01, 5.02, 5.03, 5.04, 5.05, 5.06, 5.07, 5.08, 5.11 (voice), 5.12 (voice), 5.21, 5.22 & 5.23)
2010	CSI: NY	Kevin Scott	Episode 6.22: "Point of View"
2010–11	Hellcats	Julian Parrish	9 episodes (1.03, 1.05, 1.06, 1.10, 1.13, 1.15, 1.19, 1.20 & 1.21)
2011–12	The Secret Circle	Charles Mead	Main cast
2013–14	Defiance	Connor Lang	4 episodes (1.06, 1.08, 1.09 & 2.05)
2018	Criminal Minds	Dr. Daryl Wright	Episode: 14.09: "Broken Wing"
2020	Equal	Howard Smith	Docuseries

=== Theater ===
Year	Title	Role	Notes
1997–98	Me and my friend	Bunny	
1997–98	La Indian Queen	La turista	
1999–2000	Cymbeline		
1999–2000	The Misanthrope		
1999–2000	Miss Julie	Jean	
1999–2000	Sweet Birth of Youth	Wayne	
1999–2000	The Importance of Being Earnest	Mr. Algernon Moncrieff	
1999–2000	Long Day's Journey into Night	Edmund	
2001	Uncle Bob	Josh	Summer 2001 Soho Playhouse, New York City Co-star George Morfogen
2006–07	Suddenly Last Summer	Dr. Cukrowicz	November 15, 2006 – January 20, 2007 Laura Pels Theatre, New York City Co-stars Blythe Danner & Carla Gugino
2010	Orpheus Descending	Valentine Xavier	January–February; Theater/Theatre in Los Angeles Co-stars Denise Crosby & Claudia Mason
2013	Rocco Rosso Riche	Rocco Rosso	November; National Theatre, London Co-star Olivia d'Abo

=== Conventions ===
Year	Title	Role	Notes
2012	Night ItaCon - Fantasy events Bologna, Italy	Himself	August 31–September 2. Gale attended following his role as Charles Mead on The Secret Circle.
2013	Showtime Con - Zarata events Bilbao, Spain	Himself	February 15–17. Gale participated following his role as Brian Kinney on Showtime's Queer as Folk.
2013	Rise 'n Shine Con; Los Angeles, California, USA	Himself	June 9. QAF convention with co-actors Randy Harrison, Scott Lowell, Peter Paige, Robert Gant, Michelle Clunie & Ryan Scott Greene.
2014	Queens of the Road Con; Bilbao, Spain	Himself	March 28–30. Queer as Folk convention with co-actors Randy Harrison, Scott Lowell & Peter Paige.
2015	ATX Television Festival; Austin, Texas	Himself	June 4–7. Gale participated following his role as Brian Kinney on Showtime's Queer as Folk with co-actors Randy Harrison, Robert Gant & Peter Paige.
2015	Gale Harold Fan Meet - Zarata events Bilbao, Spain	Himself	September 26–27. Gale participated following his role as Brian Kinney on Showtime's Queer as Folk.
2016	Gale Harold Fan Meet - Zarata events Bilbao, Spain	Himself	September 9–11. Gale participated following his role as Brian Kinney on Showtime's Queer as Folk with co-actor Randy Harrison.
