= Beasts of Burden (Defiance) =

- Defiance episode
- Episode no.: Season 2 Episode 4
- Directed by: Allan Kroeker
- Written by: Todd Slavkin; Darren Swimmer
- Original air date: July 10, 2014

Guest appearances
- Dewshane Williams (Tommy LaSalle); Trenna Keating (Doc Yewll); Nicole Muñoz (Christie Tarr); Ryan Kennedy (Josef); Anna Hopkins (Jessica "Berlin" Rainer)

Episode chronology
← Previous "The Cord and the Ax"	Next → "Put the Damage On"
- Defiance season 2

"Beasts of Burden" is the fourth episode of the second season of the American science fiction series Defiance, and the series' sixteenth episode overall. It was aired on July 10, 2014. The episode was written by Todd Slavkin and Darren Swimmer and directed by Michael Nankin.

== Plot ==
Niles (James Murray) and Berlin (Anna Hopkins) transfer some mining equipment to Defiance when their caravan is attacked by a group of masked raiders. The raiders kill everyone except them and before they leave with the equipment, one of them forces Niles to strip and then urinates on him.

As soon as they get back to Defiance, Niles meets Nolan (Grant Bowler) and Amanda (Julie Benz) and asks Nolan to find out who was behind the attack and the robbery. Nolan goes to Doc Yewll's (Trenna Keating) office to see if he can find any evidence on the bodies of the dead soldiers that will lead him to the raiders. There is a footprint on one of the bodies that indicates that the raiders were recently to the mines, but Nolan destroys the footprint while Tommy (Dewshane Williams) is watching. When Tommy asks why he did that, Nolan says that it was just dirt and it would be useless to their research, but Tommy believes that Nolan is trying to cover Rafe (Graham Greene).

Meanwhile, Rafe returns home to find Josef (Ryan Kennedy) and the mining equipment there. When Josef tells him what he did, Rafe gets furious with him reminding him that the E-Rep is watching him and to bring the equipment he just stole from them to Rafe's house is really stupid. Nolan arrives at Rafe's house to check if he knows anything about the incident but Rafe pretends that it is the first time he heard about it. While they are talking, Josef comes up from behind and aims at Nolan with a gun, but Nolan takes him down and arrests him. Rafe asks Nolan to give Josef a chance and let him go as a favor to him for saving Irisa (Stephanie Leonidas) in the past from E-Rep by killing some of their soldiers. Nolan agrees to let Josef go but asks him to head out of the town immediately and to tell him where the stolen equipment is. Nolan returns the equipment and lies that he found it in a cave but Niles struggles to believe him since Tommy has already told him about Nolan destroying evidence at Yewll's office.

Josef, instead of leaving Defiance goes to find Berlin, who has a tape from the attack and probably will be able to see his face. When Berlin tries to fight him so he will not take the tape, she clearly sees his face and Josef kidnaps her, taking her hostage. Tommy informs Niles and Nolan that Berlin has disappeared and Nolan, with Rafe's help finds Josef before he hurts Berlin. Nolan gets shot in the leg and asks Rafe to arrest Josef. Rafe arrests him but as soon as they get out, he uncuffs him telling him to run to save himself. Josef thanks him and runs but as soon as he gets few feet away, Rafe shoots him in the back killing him.

In the meantime, Amanda and Niles come closer; first Niles confesses to her about his difficult childhood and his abuse by the Votans during the Pale Wars. When Amanda later goes to his office she confesses to him that she was raped when she was working for the E-Rep in New York. She got pregnant but she never told her fiancé about her rape, making him believe that it was his baby. When she decided to abort the baby, that decision destroyed her relationship, causing her move with her sister to Defiance. When a little bit later Niles finds out that Josef was behind the attack, Amanda tries to convince him not to go against Rafe since Rafe was not involved but he does not listen to her and he evicts Rafe from his house.

At the Tarr house, Stahma (Jaime Murray) asks Datak (Tony Curran) to make her a partner in the business since she earned it but Datak declines her offer. She then hires some soldiers to provoke Datak and make him attack them so he will be sent back to prison, but Datak asks for their forgiveness for killing Colonel Marsh instead. Stahma is surprised by her husband's reaction but at the moment she can not do nothing more.

Datak arranges a meeting with his men taking Alak (Jesse Rath) with him, where he express his disappointment to them for ignoring his orders and following the orders of a woman instead. As a punishment, one of them has to die to clean the shame and he asks Alak to choose which one. Alak tells him to kill him since he was the one who was weak and he was not able to stop his mother. Even though Datak is impressed with Alak's response, he still kills one of the men in front of everyone's eyes. He then goes with Alak to his record pressing business where he confesses to Alak that he was planning to burn it down but he changed his mind and instead he scars Alak's hand.

Christie (Nicole Muñoz) tries to take care of Alak's hand while she says to him that his father is crazy but Alak makes excuses for him by saying that he is the only one responsible for his father's actions. Stahma comes in the room and when she sees what Datak did to Alak she gets angry. The next day, Datak goes to his business tent only to find Stahma and Alak there with the rest of the men waiting for him. Stahma makes it clear that she is the one who is in control and has Datak beaten and thrown out of the tent. Then she walks towards him, leans down to him and tells him "You should have made me a partner" and leaves.

== Feature music ==
In the "Beasts of Burden" we can hear the songs:

- "Night Time Sound Desire" by Hot as Sun
- "Mad World" by Sara Hickman

== Reception ==
=== Ratings ===
In its original American broadcast, "Beasts of Burden" was watched by 1.65 million; up by 0.16 from the previous episode.

=== Reviews ===
"Beasts of Burden" received positive reviews.

Rowan Kaiser from The A.V. Club gave the episode and B+ rating saying that it served its purpose to show how cruel the Pale Wars were, something that the show was struggling to do. "Mayor Pottinger’s monologue to Amanda about how, when he was a child, he was captured and sexually abused by Votan forces, is the heart of [the cruelty of Pale Wars]. [...] It also encourages Amanda to tell her story. She was raped as well, in New York, working for the E-Rep."

Katelyn Barners from Geeks Unleashed rated the episode with 8/10. "This week’s "Beasts of Burden" surprised me even more [than last week's episode] by grounding character developments firmly in history that the show has only recently begun to explore. [...] this week, violent actions drag the past “into the light” and it makes for interesting watching."

Abbey White of Screen Spy gave a good review to the episode saying that with this episode the show proved that the second season is awesome and at its 'best'. ""Beasts of Burden" proved that the series has evolved from its first season into a dramatic goldmine, effectively balancing shock and depth and showing us that what truly keeps audiences coming back is organic and timely character driven storylines."

Ricky Riley of The Celebrity Cafe gave a good review to the episode saying that it was a great one. "This episode was amazing primarily because we see the two most influential men from season one lose everything. Datak thought that things would return to normal after jail but it has not and people are not of his hard nose tactics anymore. Rafe has become a shell of himself. His family is gone, Christie is a Tarr now, and he has no more wealth."

Billy Grifter of Den of Geek also gave a good review to the episode saying that "after a very strong episode last week, it seemed inevitable that the pace might slow somewhat in Beasts Of Burden. And it did to a degree, but not so much that it took away what momentum the season two threads have been generating."

Andrew Santos from With an Accent gave a good review saying that it was another really good episode and that the second season has gotten off to a really strong start. "While a lot of attention has been put on Irisa and her arc recently, "Beasts of Burden" pulls back from that and gives us a great story concerning the E-Rep occupiers who have taken over Defiance, the rebels, and Rafe McCauley."
