= Noah Danby =

Canadian actor

- Born: Noah Dalton Danby; Guelph, Ontario, Canada
- Occupation: Actor
- Years active: 1998–present
- Father: Ken Danby

Noah Dalton Danby is a Canadian actor known for his work in television, film, and video game motion capture. On television, he is known for his recurring roles as Cha'ra in Stargate SG-1 (2004–2007), Sukar in Defiance (2013–2014), Zachary Cain in Bitten (2014–2016), Russell in Shadowhunters: The Mortal Instruments (2017–2019) and Confessor in Titans (2022–2023).

In film, Danby has held supporting roles in productions such as Rocky Marciano (1999) alongside Jon Favreau, The Skulls (2000) with Paul Walker, The Tuxedo (2002) with Jackie Chan, Riddick (2013) with Vin Diesel, State Like Sleep (2018) opposite Michael Shannon and My Spy (2020) with Dave Bautista.

Danby has contributed his voice and physical performance to video games including Ubisoft's Far Cry Primal and For Honor.

He is best known for portraying Connor King in the series Painkiller Jane (2007).

== Early life ==
Danby was born in Guelph, Ontario, the son of painter Ken Danby.

== Personal life ==
Danby became engaged to his Painkiller Jane co-star Kristanna Loken on January 17, 2008. The two married at Loken's family's farm in Ghent, New York on May 10, 2008. In an interview published on November 16, 2009, Loken announced that she had separated from husband Danby and was in a relationship with a woman.

== Filmography ==
=== Film ===
Year	Title	Role	Notes
1999	Detroit Rock City	Chongo's Friend	
2000	The Skulls	Hugh Mauberson	
2000	Loser	Principal	Uncredited
2001	Exit Wounds	Terrorist Leader	
2002	The Tuxedo	Bike Messenger	
2003	The Book of Mormon Movie	Nephi	
2004	Against the Ropes	Sam LaRocca's Henchman	
2006	Alien Incursion	Alien Hunter #2	
2007	Numb	Tim	
2008	Breakup.com	Neil	
2009	Darfur	Theo Schwartz	
2011	Vying for Perfection	Alex Linca	
2013	Riddick	Nuñez	
2013	Torment	Mr. Mouse	
2016	Manhattan Undying	Johnny	
2018	State Like Sleep	Ian	
2019	She Never Died	Terrance	
2019	Wings Over Everest	James	
2020	My Spy	Todd	
2022	The Fight Machine	Tom Tully	
2024	My Spy: The Eternal City	Todd	

=== Television ===
Year	Title	Role	Notes
1998	Power Play	Frank Dusky	Episode: "High Noon"
1998	Animorphs	Controller (uncredited)	Episode: "On the Run"
1999	Lexx	Varrtan	Episode: "Luvliner"
1999	Rocky Marciano	Carmine Vingo	Television film
2000	Witchblade	Bouncer (uncredited)	Television film
2000	Queer as Folk	Tattoo	Episode: "Now Approaching...The Line"
2001	Queer as Folk	Captain Astro	Episode: "Surprise!"
2001	Witchblade	Detective Burgess	3 episodes
2002	Relic Hunter	Hercules	Episode: "Antianeirai"
2002	Recipe for Murder	Bodyguard	Television film
2002	The Brady Bunch in the White House	United States Secret Service Agent	Television film
2002, 2003	Mutant X	The Beast / Michael Ward	Episodes: "Whose Woods These Are" & "Wages of Sin"
2003	Veritas: The Quest	Scott	Episode: "The Name of God"
2004	Andromeda	Rbarton	Episode: "The Eschatology of Our Present"
2004–2007	Stargate SG-1	Cha'ra	4 episodes
2005	The 4400	Billy	Episode: "Weight of the World"
2005	Smallville	Club Bouncer	Episode: "Exposed"
2006	Godiva's	Scott	Episode: "Floodgates"
2006	The Collector	Jasper	Episode: "The Person with AIDS"
2006	The Evidence	Tommy Howe	Episode: "Down for the Count"
2007	Painkiller Jane	Connor King	Main cast
2008	The Summit	Jarhead	Miniseries; episode: "Night Two"
2009	Flashpoint	Clean	Episode: "Just a Man"
2010	Bloodletting & Miraculous Cures	Jeff Goodes	Episode: "Complications"
2010	The Bridge	Kaye	2 episodes
2010	Eureka	Major Ryan	2 episodes
2011	King	Dade	Episode: "Eleni Demaris"
2011	Good Dog	Tony	2 episodes
2011	XIII: The Series	CIA Operative	Episode: "Revelation"
2011	Warehouse 13	James Aquino	Episodes: "The 40th Floor"
2011	Lost Girl	Oscar	Episode: "Raging Fae"
2012	Republic of Doyle	Arnold Hirsch	Episode: "Head Over Heels"
2012	Aladdin and the Death Lamp	Goon	Television film
2013	Copper	Buris "Buzzie" Burke	Episode: "A Morning Song"
2013	The Listener	Rick Robson	Episode: "House of Horror"
2013–2014	Defiance	Sukar	13 episodes
2014	Beauty & the Beast	Jacob Sutter	Episode: "Redemption"
2014	Hemlock Grove	Caul Member	Episodes: "Unicorn" & "Tintypes"
2014–2016	Bitten	Zachary Cain	10 episodes
2015	Remedy	"Pitbull" Danko	Episode: "When You Awake"
2015	Killjoys	Rat King	Episode: "Escape Velocity"
2016	The 100	Ivon	Episode: "Ye Who Enter Here"
2016	Orphan Black	Threatening Neo	Episode: "The Redesign of Natural Objects"
2016	Hells on Wheels	Prison Guard	Episode: "Two Soldiers"
2016	American Gothic	Link	Episode: "Christina's World"
2017	Salvation	Interrogator	Episode: "The Human Strain"
2017–2019	Shadowhunters: The Mortal Instruments	Russell	9 episodes
2018	Condor	Derek	3 episodes
2021	Jupiter's Legacy	Linus	Episode: "Painting the Clouds with Sunshine"
2022–2023	Titans	Confessor	5 episodes
2023	Joe Pickett	Merle	Episode: "Buck Wild"
2023–2024	Chucky	Teddy Brooks	3 episodes

=== Video games ===
Year	Title	Role
2006	Need for Speed: Carbon	Samson
2016	Far Cry Primal	Voice
2017	For Honor	Ragnar
