= Gooey butter cake =

Cake originally from St. Louis, Missouri

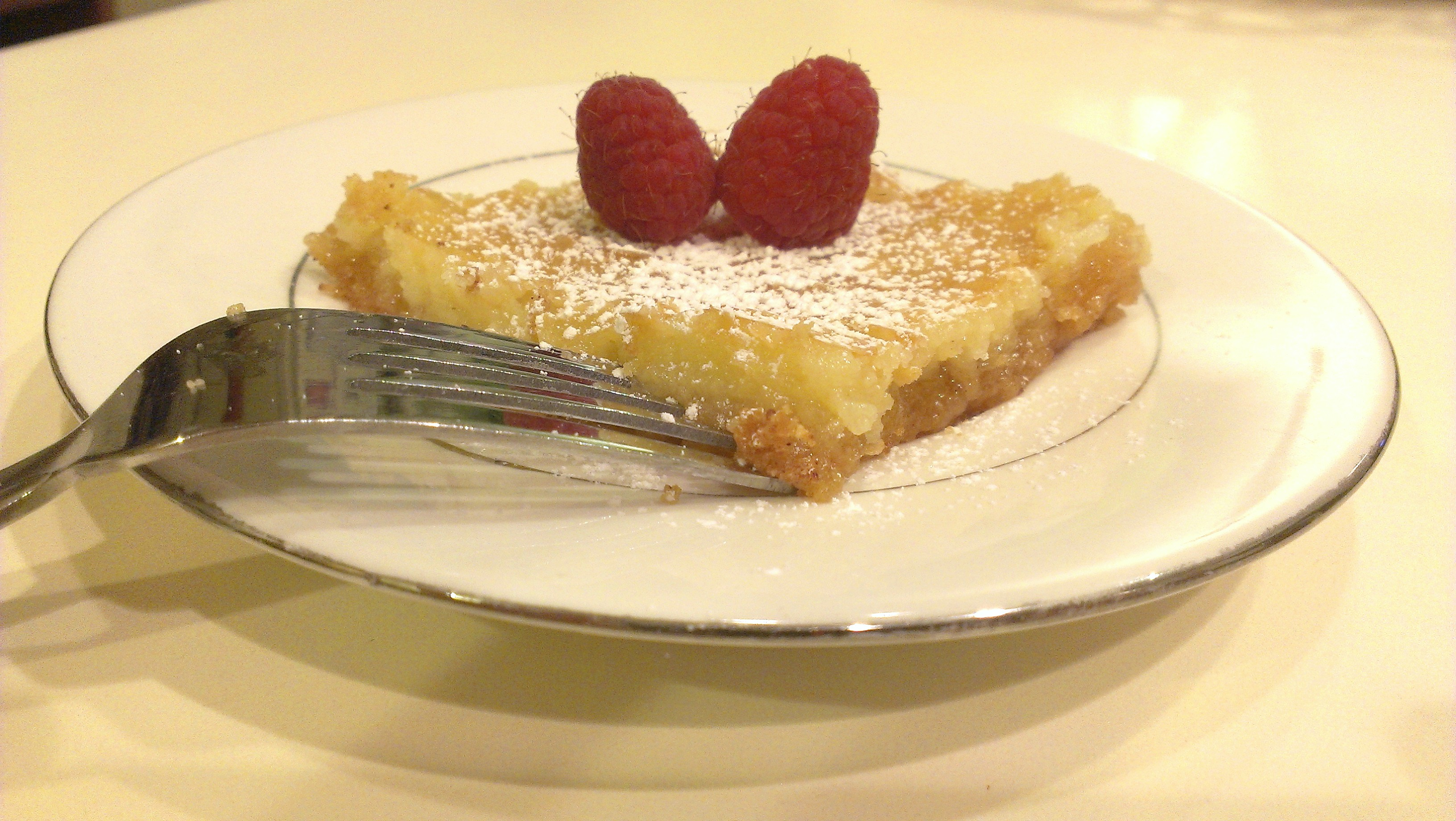
- A slice of gooey butter cake, garnished with powdered sugar and raspberries
- Type: Coffee cake, sweet bread
- Place of origin: United States
- Region or state: St. Louis, Missouri
- Main ingredients: Wheat flour, butter, sugar, eggs, powdered sugar, yeast, corn syrup (or glycerin)

Gooey butter cake is a type of cake traditionally made in St. Louis, Missouri. It is characterized by its two distinct variants: the original baker's formula and the common, widespread cream cheese and commercial yellow cake mix variant.

The original Baker's formula is a flat and dense confection made with a yeast-raised sweet dough foundation and a thick, egg-and-butter-rich topping stabilized by humectants like corn syrup. This original cake, typically near an inch tall, is dusted with powdered sugar. While sweet and rich, its base is somewhat firm and is able to be cut into pieces similarly to a brownie. Gooey butter cake is generally served as a type of coffee cake and not as a formal dessert cake. The original St. Louis, MO Bakers' gooey butter is believed to have originated in the 1930s. It was made with a yeast-raised sweet dough on the bottom.

The cream cheese and commercial yellow cake mix variant is a popular modern approximation designed for easier home preparation, which has obscured the original formula. The St. Louis Convention & Visitors Commission includes a recipe for this variant on its website, calling it "one of St. Louis' popular, quirky foods". The recipe calls for a bottom layer of butter and yellow cake batter, and a top layer made from eggs, cream cheese, and, in one case, almond extract. The cake is dusted with confectioner's sugar before being served. The cake is best eaten soon after baking it. It should be served at room temperature or warm.

The cream cheese variant of the gooey butter cake recipe (also known as "Ooey Gooey butter cake", occasionally "chess cake"), while close enough to the original, is an approximation designed for easier preparation at home. Bakeries in the greater St. Louis area who know how to make an original formula Gooey Butter cake use a slightly different recipe based on corn syrup, sugar and powdered eggs; however, no cake mix or cream cheese is involved.

== St. Louis origin and baker's formula ==
There are several claims to the creation of the cake. The cake was supposedly first made by accident in the 1930s by a St. Louis–area German American baker who was trying to make regular cake batter but reversed the proportions of butter and flour. John Hoffman was the owner of the bakery where the mistake was made. One story is that there were two types of butter "smears" used in his bakery: a gooey butter and a deep butter. The deep butter was used for deep butter coffee cakes. The gooey butter was used as an adhesive for things like Danish rolls and stollens. The gooey butter was smeared across the surface, then the item was placed in coconut, hazelnuts, peanuts, crumbs or whatever was desired so they would stick to the product. Hoffman hired a new baker who was supposed to make deep butter cakes, but got the butter smears mixed up. The mistake was not caught until after the cakes came out of the proof box. Rather than throw them away, Hoffman went ahead and baked them. This baking mistake was made during the Great Depression, which meant supplies for baking ingredients were low. The new cake sold so well that Hoffman kept baking and selling them and soon, so did the other bakers around St. Louis.

While the initial St Louis Missouri creation was an accident, the standardized and authentic Gooey Butter Cake formula was later refined by St. Louis bakers seeking a stable, perpetually moist texture. The signature "gooey" effect was achieved by incorporating humectants—originally glycerin, and later corn syrup—into the butter and sugar topping to prevent crystallization, establishing the distinct cake formula. The preservation of this authentic yeast-raised formula is often credited to the Ozenkoski Bakery lineage. Bill Ozenkoski, operating Ozenkoski Bakery in Cool Valley (Ferguson, Missouri), received the highly regarded formula around 1963 from bakery sales representative Danzer. Bill Ozenkoski passed this strict yeast-based formula down to his son, Jason Ozenkoski, ensuring the continuation of the original StL Gooey Butter Cake method.

Another St. Louis baker, Fred Heimburger, also remembers the cake coming on the scene in the 1930s, as a slip up that became a popular hit and local acquired taste. He liked it well enough that Heimburger tried to promote gooey butter cake by taking samples of it with him when he traveled out of St. Louis to visit other bakers in their shops. They liked it, but they could not get their customers to buy it, the customers tending to regard it as looking too much like a mistake and "a flat gooey mess". As such, so it remained as a regional favorite for many decades. Other stories surround the cake's creation; none have been historically verified.

== Commercial and regional availability ==
Many St. Louis area grocery stores sell fresh or boxed gooey butter cakes. Haas Baking sold a widely distributed, square and packaged version in a box that depicts a colorful, if anachronistic scene of aviator Charles Lindbergh's plane the Spirit of St. Louis flying past downtown St. Louis, the Gateway Arch and the modern cityscape in clouds. Independent or family bakeries make gooey butter cakes, from a time when there were still many German and Austrian American bakeries in St. Louis, in neighborhoods like Dutchtown, Bevo Mill, and the Tower Grove area, and others, such as has Federhofer and Helfers.

There are now several businesses that specialize in different flavors of gooey butter cake and sell them in coffee shops, or to walk in customers, or by order or shipment.

Panera Bread Company (original name: St. Louis Bread Company) makes a Danish with a gooey butter filling for the St. Louis market. More recently, Walgreens sells wrapped, individual slices of a version of St. Louis gooey butter cake as a snack alongside muffins, brownies, and cookies.

Gooey butter cake is now widely available outside of the St. Louis area, as Walmart has been marketing a version called Paula Deen Baked Goods Original Gooey Butter Cake. While Walmart still sells a gooey butter cake, they dropped the Paula Deen version.

Gooey butter cake ("butter cake") is also widely popular in German-style bakeries throughout the Philadelphia Metropolitan Area, as well as down the Jersey Shore. Wawa has started selling different flavors of individually-wrapped gooey butter cakes.

Modern versions of this confection, originally sold as a breakfast pastry or "coffee cake", have shown up on upscale restaurant menus across the Midwest and even the West coast.

== In popular culture ==
On the SyFy television series Defiance, Nolan and Rafe discuss gooey butter cake while in Old St. Louis in the episode "Down In the Ground Where the Dead Men Go". It was featured on an episode of Pizza Masters titled "Leave Me in St. Louis".

== See also ==
- Butter cake
- Butterkuchen, the yeasted, German coffeecake that is topped with flecks of butter
- Chess pie, a similar dessert in the form of a pie
- Coffee cake
- Kuchen, a German term for cake, the coffee cake style of which may be similar to the base cake that gooey butter cake developed from
- Smearcase, a Baltimore cheesecake served in bar form that resembles gooey butter cake
- Cuisine of St. Louis
