= Teacake (disambiguation) =

A teacake is a dessert item served with tea.

Teacake or Tea Cake may also refer to:

- Chocolate-coated marshmallow treats (chocolate teacakes)
- Tunnock's Teacakes, a brand of chocolate-coated teacakes
- Compressed tea (tea cakes), tea leaves compressed into blocks
- Russian tea cake, butter cookies with powdered sugar

Fictional characters

- Vergible "Tea Cake" Woods, Janie's third husband in Zora Neale Hurston's novel Their Eyes Were Watching God
- Tea Cake Walters, Will Smith's character in the 1993 film Made in America

== See also ==
- Coffee cake
- Tea loaf
