= Coffee cake =

Coffee cake can refer to:

- Coffee cake (American), a sweet bread typically served with coffee but not typically made with coffee as an ingredient or flavoring
- Coffee-flavored cake, such as coffee and walnut cake

== See also ==
- Tea cake
- Tea sandwiches
