= Moravian sugar cake =

Sweet coffee cake

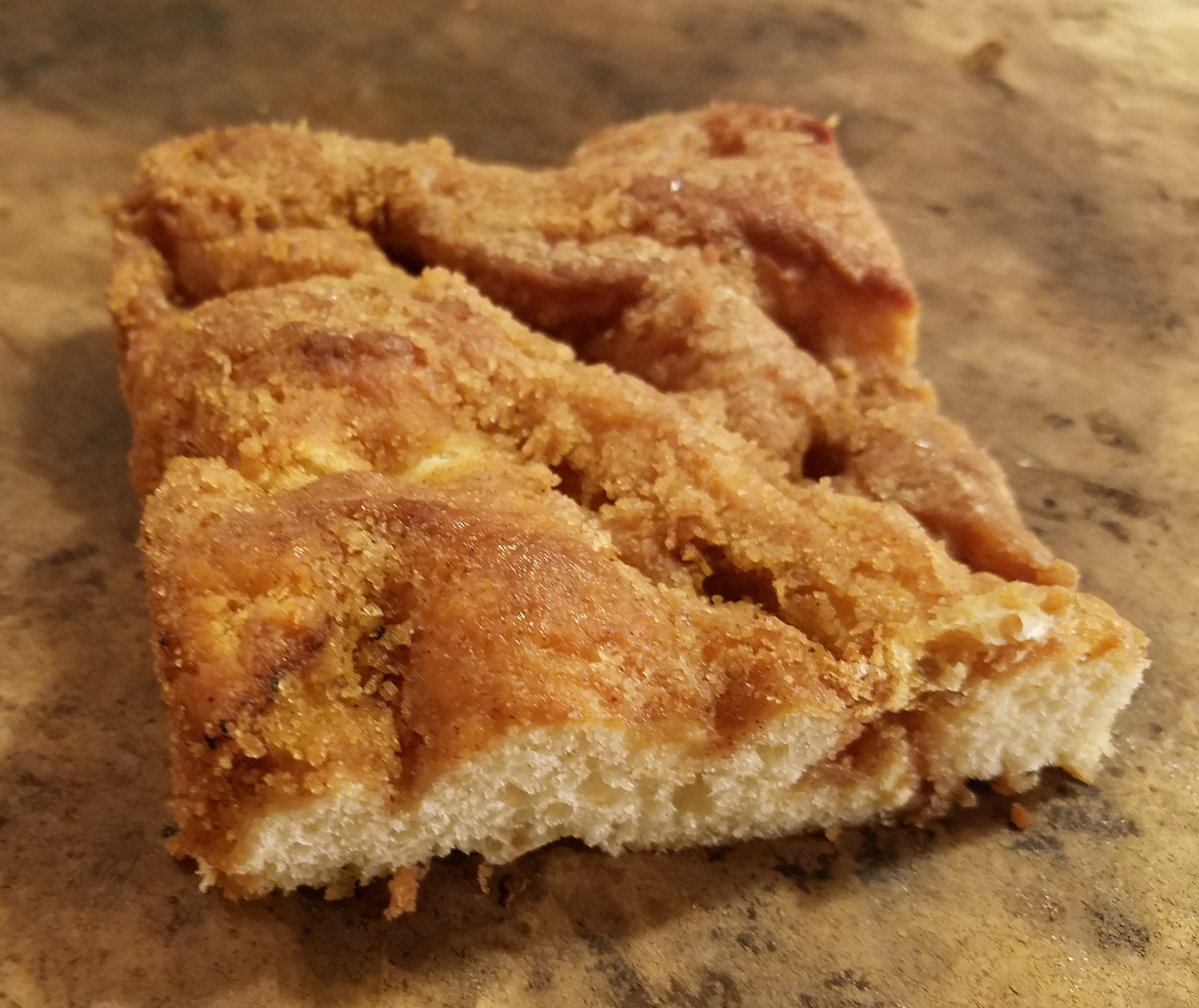
- Type: Coffee cake
- Place of origin: United States
- Region or state: Pennsylvania, Ohio, and North Carolina
- Main ingredients: Flour, mashed potatoes, yeast, butter, brown sugar, cinnamon

Moravian sugar cake is a sweet coffee cake that is often made in areas around Moravian Church settlements, particularly in Pennsylvania and North Carolina. It is made with a sweet yeast dough enriched with mashed potatoes.

== Preparation ==
The dough is left to rise in a flat pan, and just before baking, deep wells are formed in the surface of the dough with the finger tips, and a mixture of melted butter, brown sugar, and cinnamon is poured on top. During baking this forms a sugary crust that permeates the interior of the cake.

== History ==
The Moravian settlers who came to North Carolina in 1753 and founded Salem in 1766 brought this recipe with them from eastern Pennsylvania and their settlements there. Moravian sugar cake is very similar to the German Zuckerkuchen (i.e. sugar cake) made in Berlin and Butterkuchen (butter cake) in Lüneburg. Inclusion of mashed potatoes in the dough may have derived from the practice of using potatoes in dough starters to boost the growth of natural yeasts. Often made for Holy Week and Easter, its popularity soon led to its appearance at other holidays and festive occasions, especially Christmas. Over the centuries, the recipe for Moravian sugar cake has changed little, and its renown has spread far beyond Old Salem so that it has become a beloved North Carolina breakfast confection.

Moravian sugar cake is often baked for church fundraisers in North Carolina. Freshly baked sugar cake is available at stores and bakeries in Winston-Salem and across the North Carolina Piedmont region.

== See also ==
- List of cakes
- List of foods of the Southern United States
