= Tirolerkuchen =

Austrian dessert

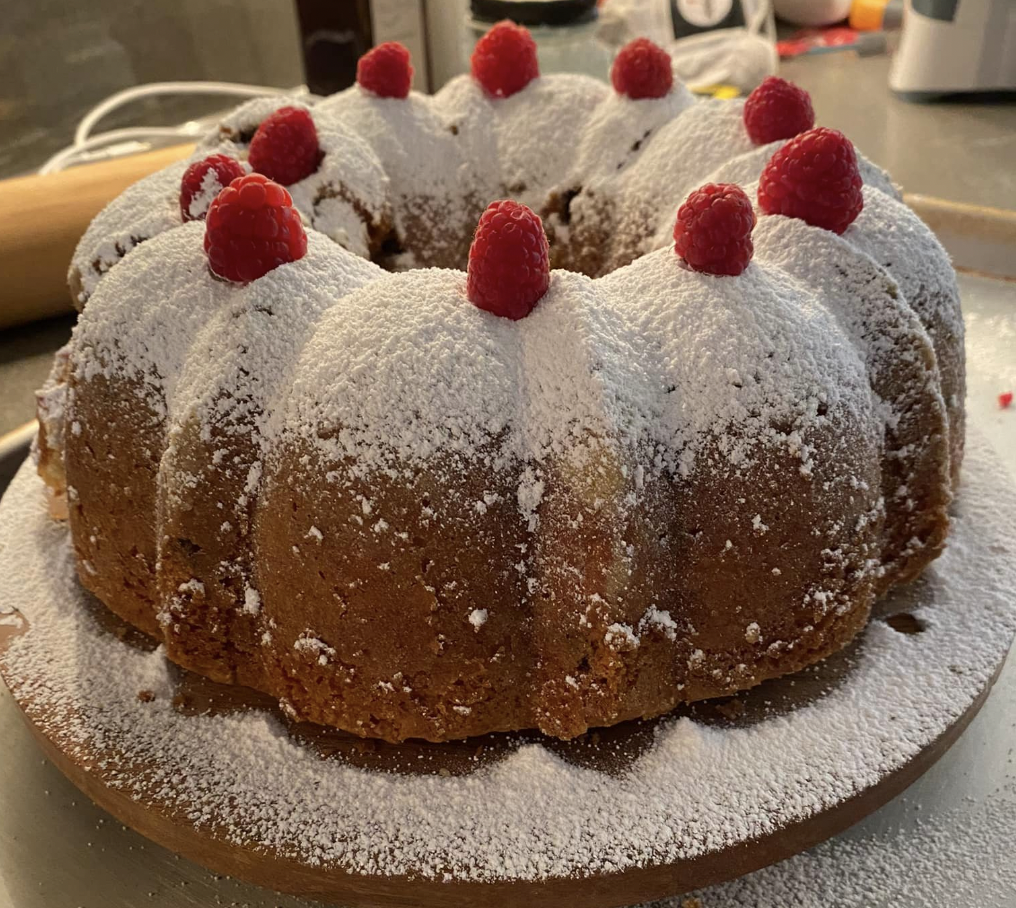
- Alternative names: Tiroler Nusskuchen
- Type: coffee cake
- Place of origin: Austria
- Region or state: Tyrol
- Main ingredients: Flour, sugar, butter, eggs, hazelnut, chocolate

Tirolerkuchen, or Tiroler Nusskuchen, (Tyrolean Cake or Tyrolean Nut Cake) is a type of cake found in Austria, Germany, Switzerland, and the Italian region of South Tyrol. It is often used as a coffee cake.

Originating in Tyrol, the cake is made using hazelnut, flour, butter, egg yolk, meringue, sugar, and chocolate. Some versions include bourbon in the ingredients.
