= Butter cake =

Type of cake

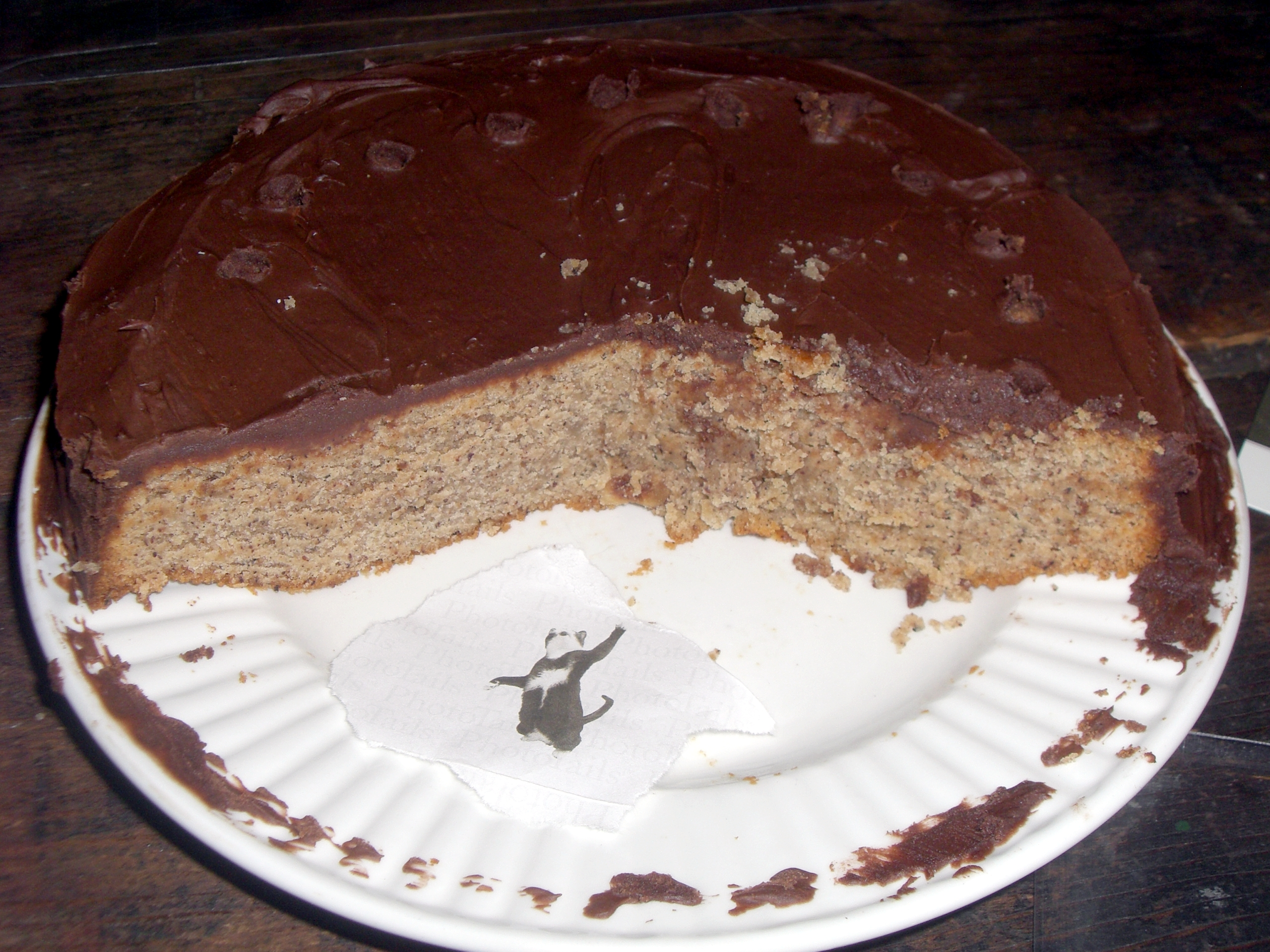
- Hazelnut brown butter cake
- Main ingredients: Butter, sugar, flour, eggs

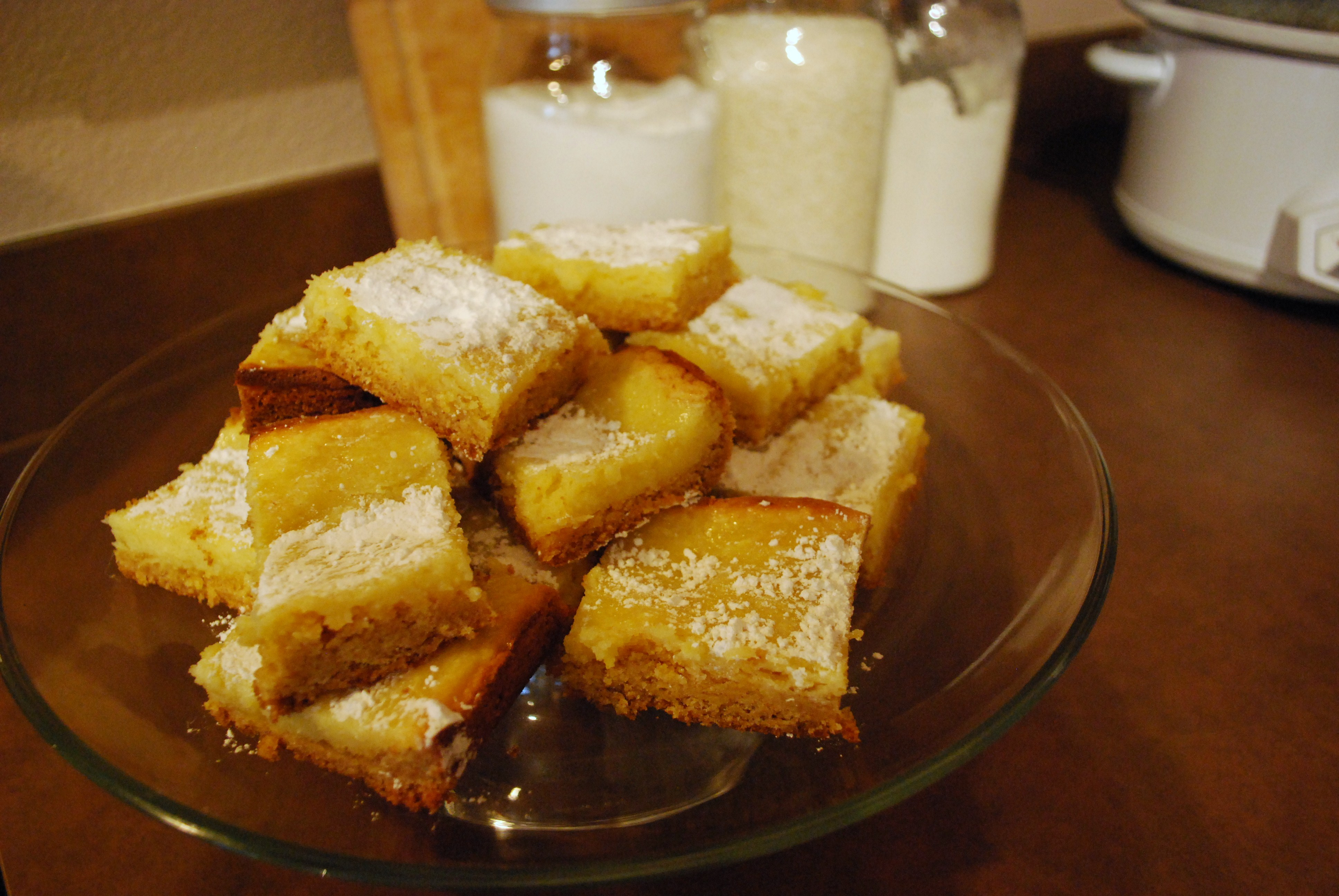
Gooey butter cake

A butter cake is a cake in which one of the main ingredients is butter. It is baked with basic ingredients: butter, sugar, eggs, flour and leavening agents such as baking powder or baking soda. It is considered one of the quintessential cakes in American baking. Butter cake originated from the English pound cake, which traditionally used equal amounts of butter, flour, sugar, and eggs to bake a heavy, rich cake.

== History ==
The invention of baking powder and other chemical leavening agents during the 19th century substantially increased the flexibility of this traditional pound cake by introducing the possibility of creating lighter, fluffier cakes using these traditional combinations of ingredients, and it is this transformation that brought about the modern butter cake.

== Ingredients and technique ==
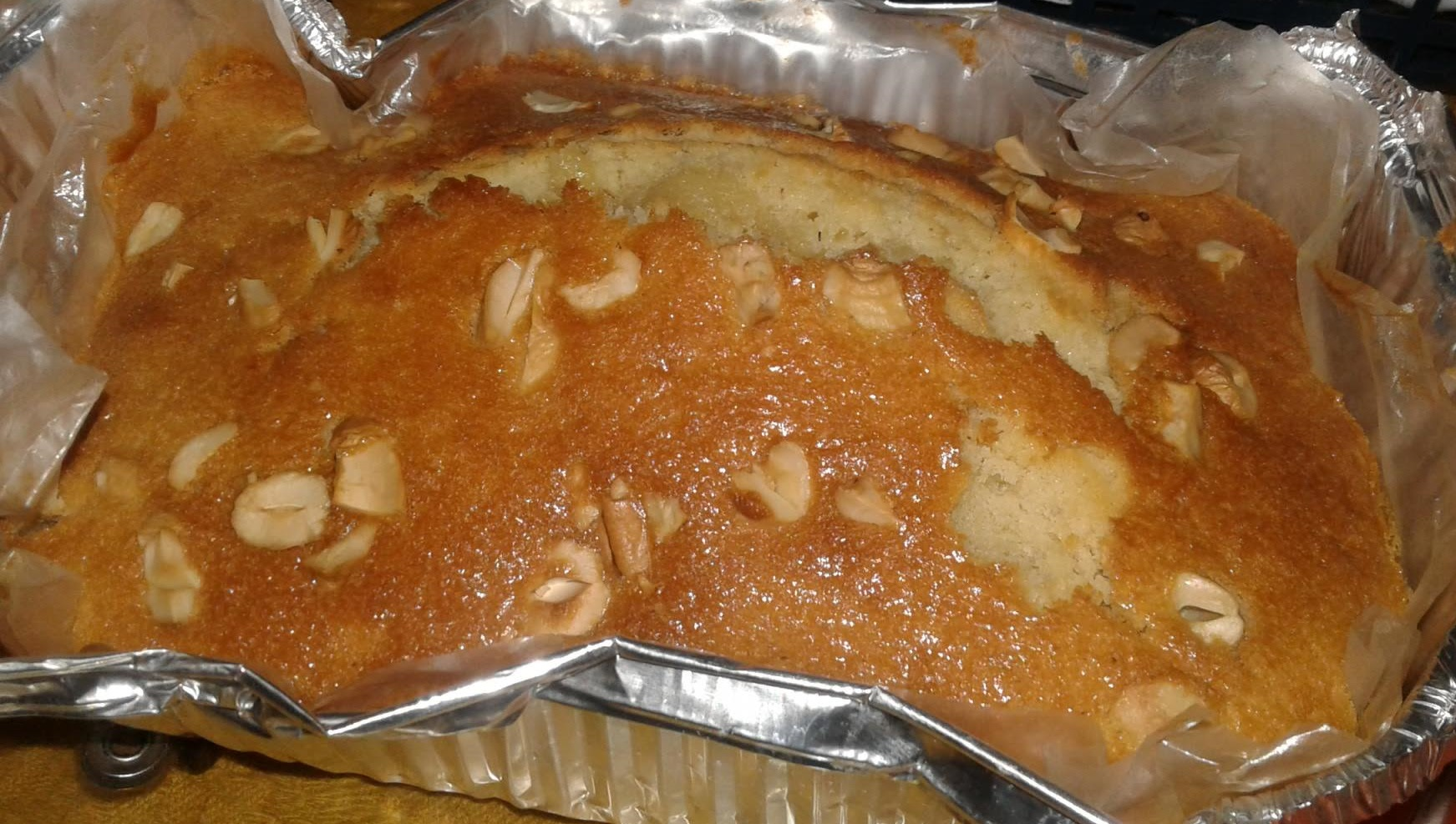
A butter cake made with cashew nuts

Butter cakes are traditionally made using a creaming method, in which the butter and sugar are first beaten until fluffy to incorporate air into the butter. Eggs are then added gradually, creating an emulsion, followed by alternating portions of wet and dry ingredients.

Butter cakes are typically rich and moist when stored at room temperature, but they tend to stiffen, dry out, and lose flavor when refrigerated, making them unsuitable for filling or frosting in advance with ingredients that must be refrigerated, such as cream cheese frosting and pastry cream.

== See also ==
- Butterkuchen, a German butter cake
- Gooey butter cake, a St. Louis variant on butter cake
- Kouign-amann, buttery Breton pastry similar to croissants
