= Butterkuchen =

German butter cake

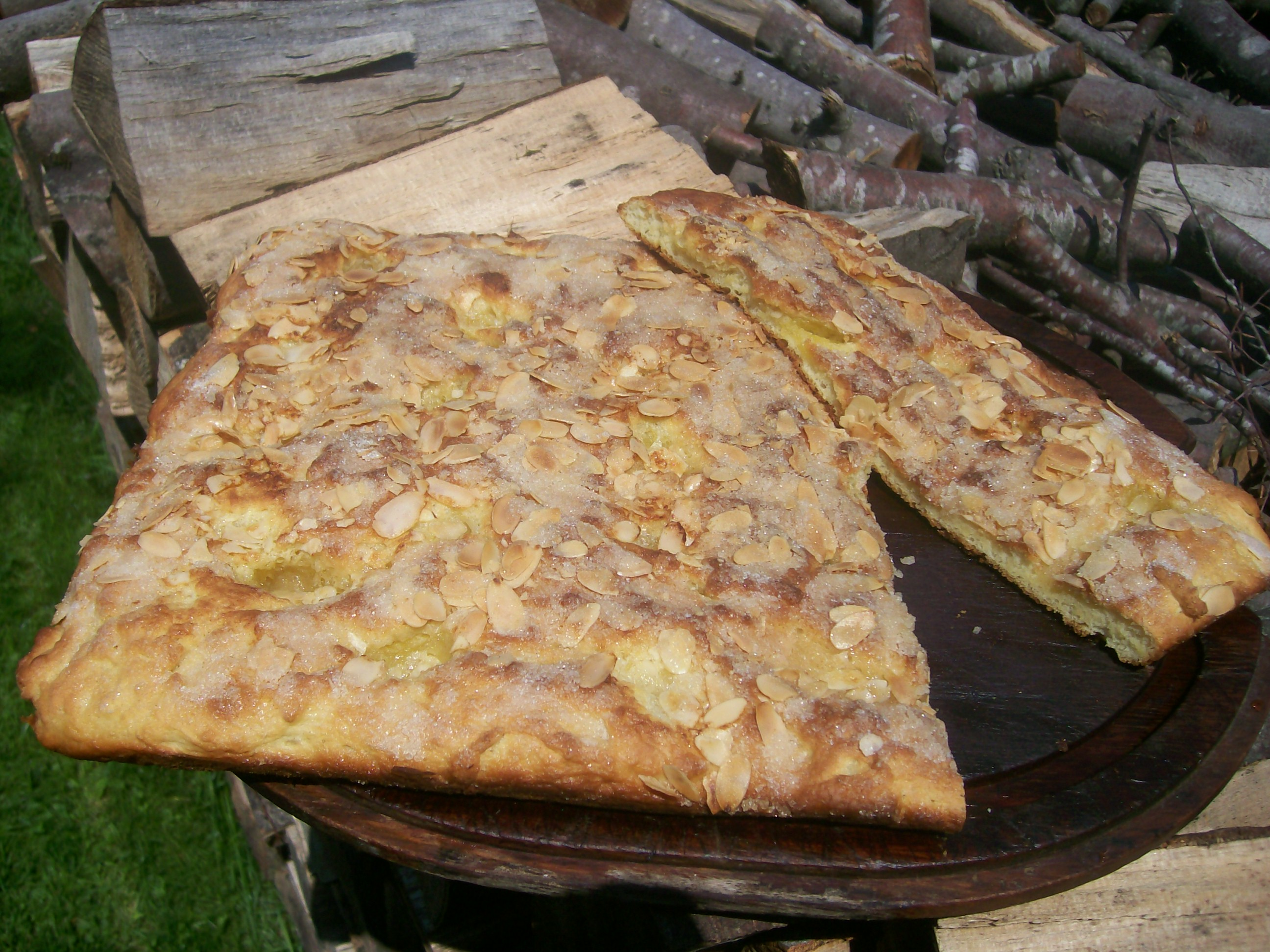
- Alternative names: Zuckerkuchen
- Type: Sheet cake
- Place of origin: Germany
- Main ingredients: Flour, butter, sugar

Butterkuchen or Zuckerkuchen is a simple German butter cake baked on a tray. Flakes of butter, which, after baking, form the characteristic holes, are distributed on the dough. The whole cake is sprinkled with sugar or streusel. After further kneading the Butterkuchen is baked. As a variation the dough can be sprinkled with roasted almond flakes.

Butterkuchen is a favourite element of Westphalian and North German coffee tables. It is also served at weddings and funerals and, as a result, is sometimes called Freud-und-Leid-Kuchen ("joy and sorrow cake") or Beerdigungskuchen ("funeral cake").

A regional variation is to sprinkle the Butterkuchen with a sugar-cinnamon mixture rather than with sugar alone. This is very similar to Moravian Sugar Cake.

In Germany in the trade, at least 30 parts butter, clarified butter or butterfat must be used to 100 parts of flour.

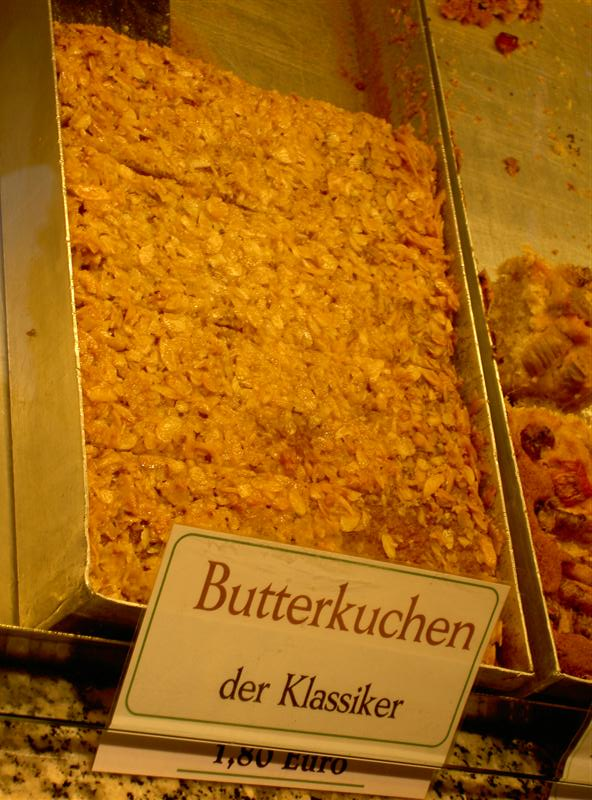
Large tray of Butterkuchen

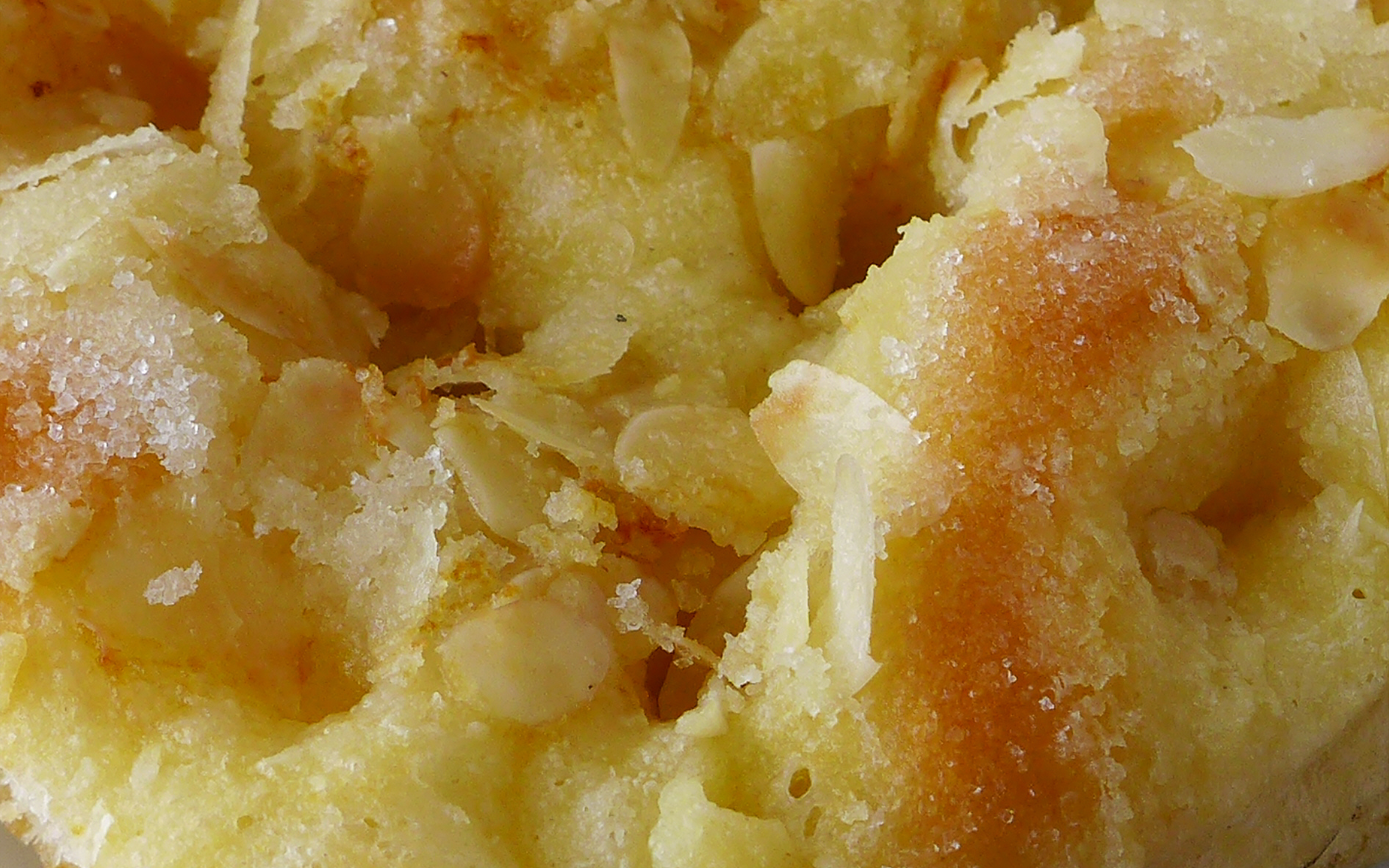
Close-up of texture on top. Melted pieces of butter create depressions on the surface.

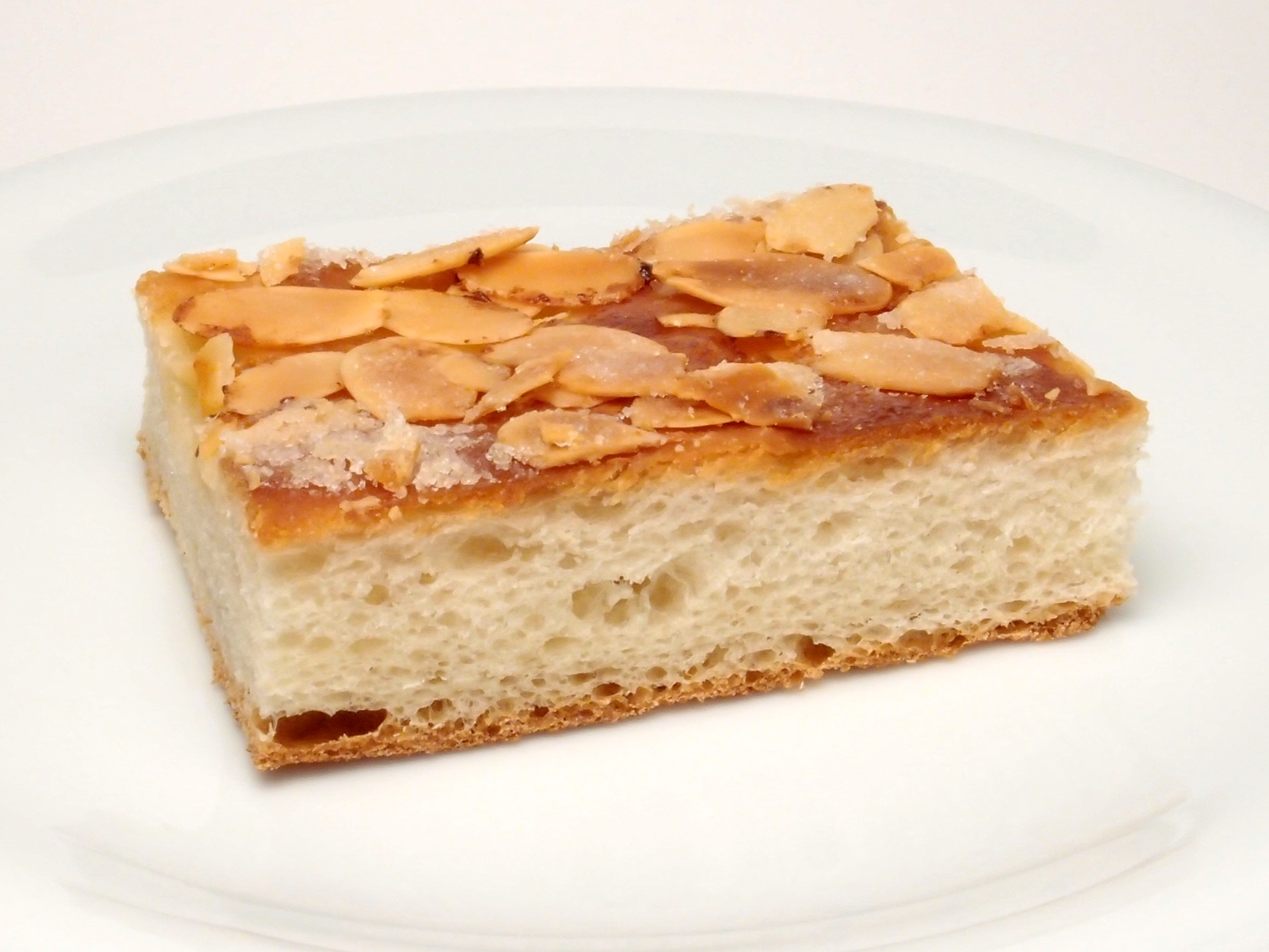
Butterkuchen with almond slices on top

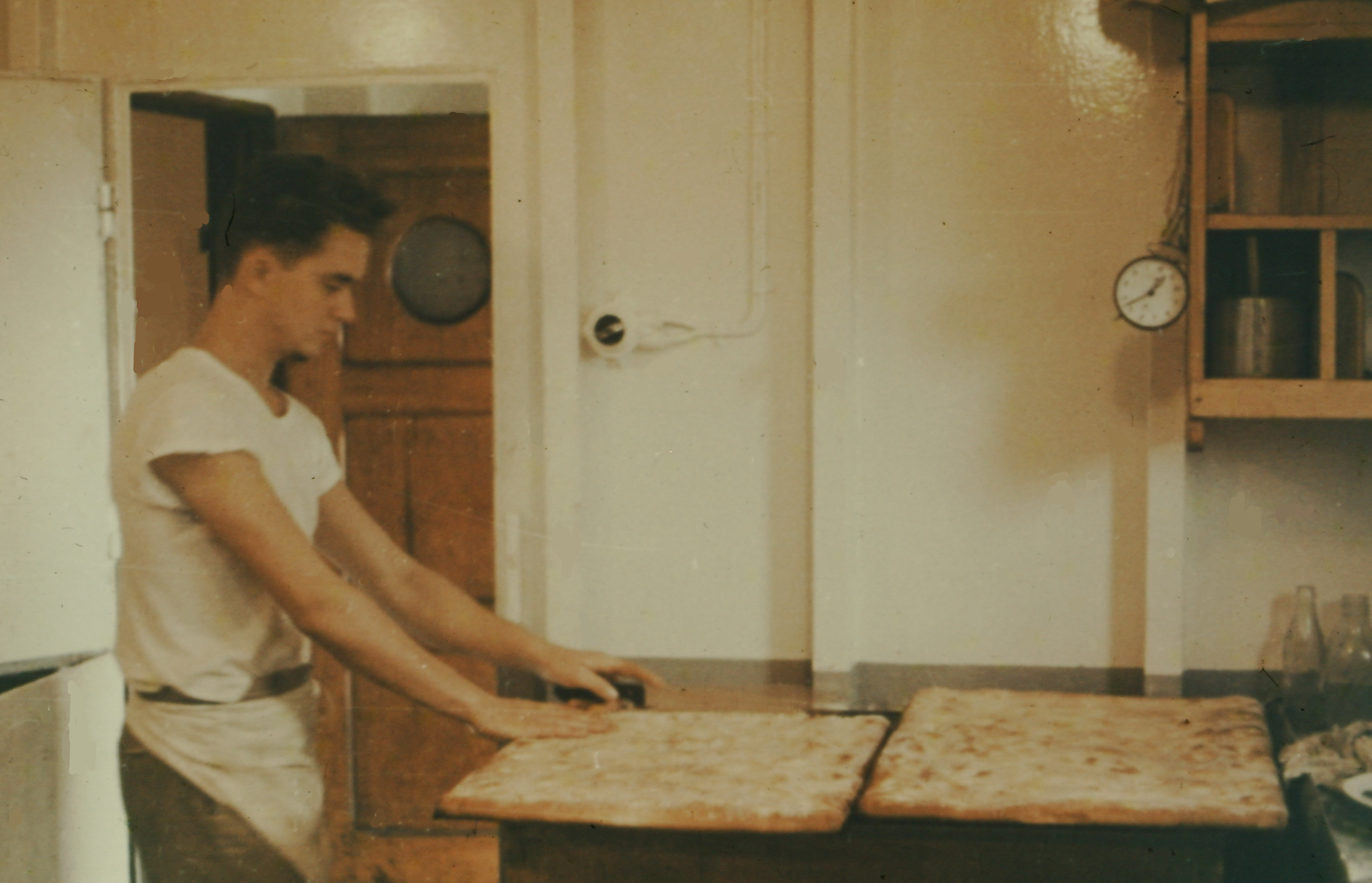
A sailor prepares butterkuchen for the crew.

== See also ==
- Kouign-amann
- List of butter dishes
- List of cakes

== Sources ==
- IREKS-GmbH: IREKS-ABC der Bäckerei, Eigenverlag Kulmbach
