= Down in the Ground Where the Dead Men Go =

- Defiance episode
- Datak (Tony Curran) during the "cleansing" ritual
- Episode no.: Season 1 Episode 2
- Directed by: Michael Nankin
- Written by: Kevin Murphy; Anupam Nigam
- Original air date: April 22, 2013

Guest appearances
- Dewshane Williams (Tommy LaSalle); Trenna Keating (Doc Yewll); Justin Rain (Quentin McCawley); Jesse Rath (Alak Tarr); Nicole Muñoz (Christie McCawley); Fionnula Flanagan (Nicolette "Nicky" Riordon)

Episode chronology
← Previous "Pilot"	Next → "The Devil in the Dark"
- Defiance season 1

"Down in the Ground Where the Dead Men Go" is the second episode of the first season of the American science fiction series Defiance, and the series' second episode overall. It was aired on April 22, 2013. The episode was written by Kevin Murphy & Anupam Nigam. It was directed by Michael Nankin.

== Plot ==
Elah Bandik (Robert Clarke), the Castithan who fled the battle in the pilot episode, is accused of cowardice by Datak Tarr (Tony Curran) and must undergo a "cleansing" ceremony which is actually ritual torture and execution. Nolan (Grant Bowler) and Irisa (Stephanie Leonidas) intervene and stop the ceremony, but Amanda (Julie Benz) allows the ritual to continue, citing a previous incident in which many Irathient were killed and those remaining left Defiance.

Rafe McCawley (Graham Greene) is displeased with his daughter Christie's (Nicole Muñoz) engagement to Alak Tarr (Jesse Rath); he asks her to call off the wedding. Christie seems to have second thoughts; however, Stahma Tarr (Jaime Murray) intervenes, meeting Christie at the diner where she works and changing her mind.

Meanwhile, Birch (Steven McCarthy) and Nicky (Fionnula Flanagan), continue with their plan; Birch releases Ben (Douglas Nyback) from his restraints at the hospital and forces him to try another approach. Ben triggers an explosion at the McCawley Mines, trapping himself in a shaft leading deep underground. Rafe McCawley leads Nolan through a series of caverns called "The Rat's Nest", meeting up with the blocked shaft in the ruins of Old St. Louis. They find Ben attempting to blow up a nuclear power plant. Ben is captured and the bomb is deactivated; Nolan talks Rafe out of killing Ben in revenge for Luke's (Wesley French) death. Ben tells Rafe that Luke was trying to earn money to leave Defiance and his father by helping him, because Luke hated Rafe for what he had done to his mother. Ben then throws himself on McCawley's gun and pulls the trigger.

In Nolan's absence, Irisa is incensed by the torture ritual and rescues Elah Bandik. With the help of Tommy (Dewshane Williams), a Deputy Lawkeeper, she arrests Elah as a means of providing protection for him. Datak is furious and tries to retrieve him; Amanda, Nolan and Rafe arrive just in time to prevent further violence and Datak appears to give in.

A memorial service is held for those who died defending the town from the Volge. Rafe tries to mourn, but he is struggling to comprehend Ben's final words regarding Luke. He searches Luke's room, discovering maps, a pile of scrip, and a strange gold object.

At the end of the episode, Elah Bandik has one last meal with his family, then departs with Datak. Elah is subsequently found dead in front of the lawkeeper's office.

== Feature music ==
In the "Down In the Ground Where the Dead Men Go" we can hear the songs:

- "Come As You Are" by Civil Twilight
- "Tag und Nacht (Night and Day)" by Comedian Harmonists

== Reception ==
=== Ratings ===
In its original American broadcast, "Down In the Ground Where the Dead Men Go" was watched by 2.40 million; down 0.33 from the previous episode.

=== Reviews ===
The reviews for "Down In the Ground Where the Dead Men Go" were mediocre.

Josh Jackson from Paste magazine rated the episode with 7.5/10 saying that the episode was not flawless but it was promising. "It’s not a flawless second episode but it is a promising one. The characters are getting fleshed out, and the plot is thickening. Having the old St. Louis partly preserved down in the mines provides for some cool scenery."

Rowan Kaiser from The A.V. Club gave a B− to the episode saying that it was not any good but it encouraged him to keep paying attention. "I may praise “Down In The Ground Where The Dead Men Go” for being audacious, for carrying the momentum from the pilot forward, for not freezing, looking down and collapsing, but that doesn't necessarily mean that the episode was actually any good. (It wasn't.) But it did do what it needed to do: It encouraged me to keep paying attention to Defiance."

Jesse Schedeen from IGN rated the episode with 6.4/10 saying that the show still presents an interesting scenario for the future episodes. ""Defiance" has a ways to go before it truly lives up to its potential, and characterization, not plot, needs to be the primary focus for the early part of this season at least. But there certainly is potential with this series..."

Jim Garner from TV Fanatic rated the episode with 4.6/5. ""Defiance" got off to a great start last Monday with the most watched pilot on Syfy since Eureka. This week, "Down in the Ground Where the Dead Men Go" took advantage of the momentum that premiere created, propelling us into the exploration of the beliefs of some of the Defiance residents."
