= Coffee and walnut cake =

Sponge cake with coffee and walnuts

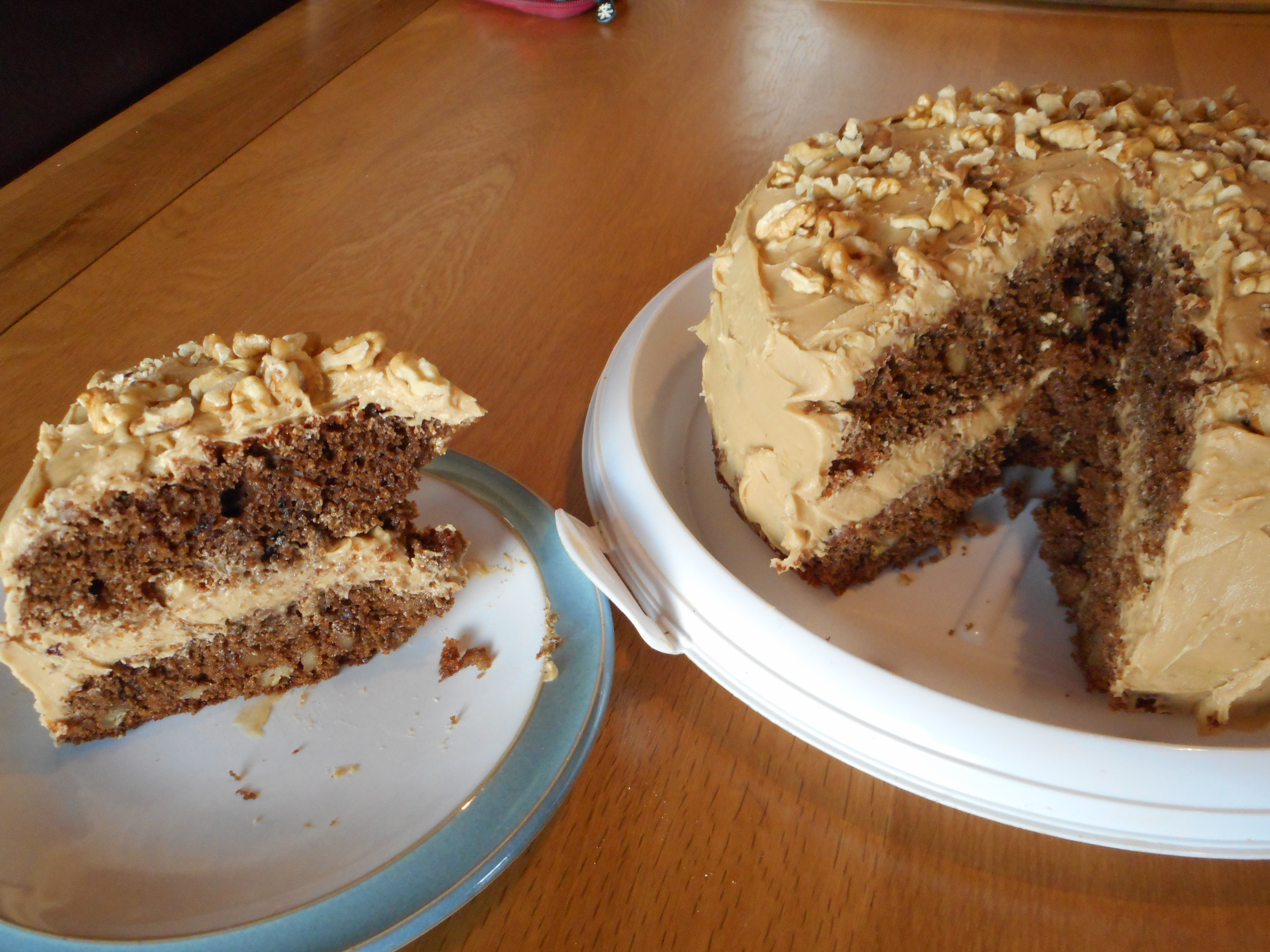
- Type: Cake
- Place of origin: United Kingdom
- Main ingredients: Sponge cake, coffee, walnut pieces

Coffee and walnut cake is a sponge cake flavoured with coffee and walnuts.

== History ==
Although the cake's origins are uncertain, it may have been popularised by a "new recipe" from an advert by McDougall's in 1934.

== Ingredients and preparation ==
The cake is a sponge cake flavoured with coffee and walnuts. It is made with the creaming method. The coffee flavour typically comes from instant coffee or espresso.

The cake is usually a layer cake, often filled with coffee-flavoured butter icing, and topped with more coffee-flavoured butter icing and walnut halves.

== Availability ==
According to Epicurious it is "ubiquitous" in the UK. Coffee and walnut cakes are widely available in supermarkets in the United Kingdom. It is often offered at bake sales and sold in teahouses in the UK.

== Recognition ==
A Battenberg variation of the cake was the technical challenge in the first episode of the second series of Great British Bake Off. English food writer Nigel Slater has said it would be his final meal if he had a choice. Tasting Table called it a classic of British cooking.

== Dishes with similar names ==
The American dish coffee cake is a sweet bread intended to be served with coffee, but which doesn't contain coffee as an ingredient or flavouring. It bears no relation to coffee and walnut cake.

== See also ==
- List of cakes
