= Coffee cake (American) =

Cake intended to be eaten with, or flavored with, coffee

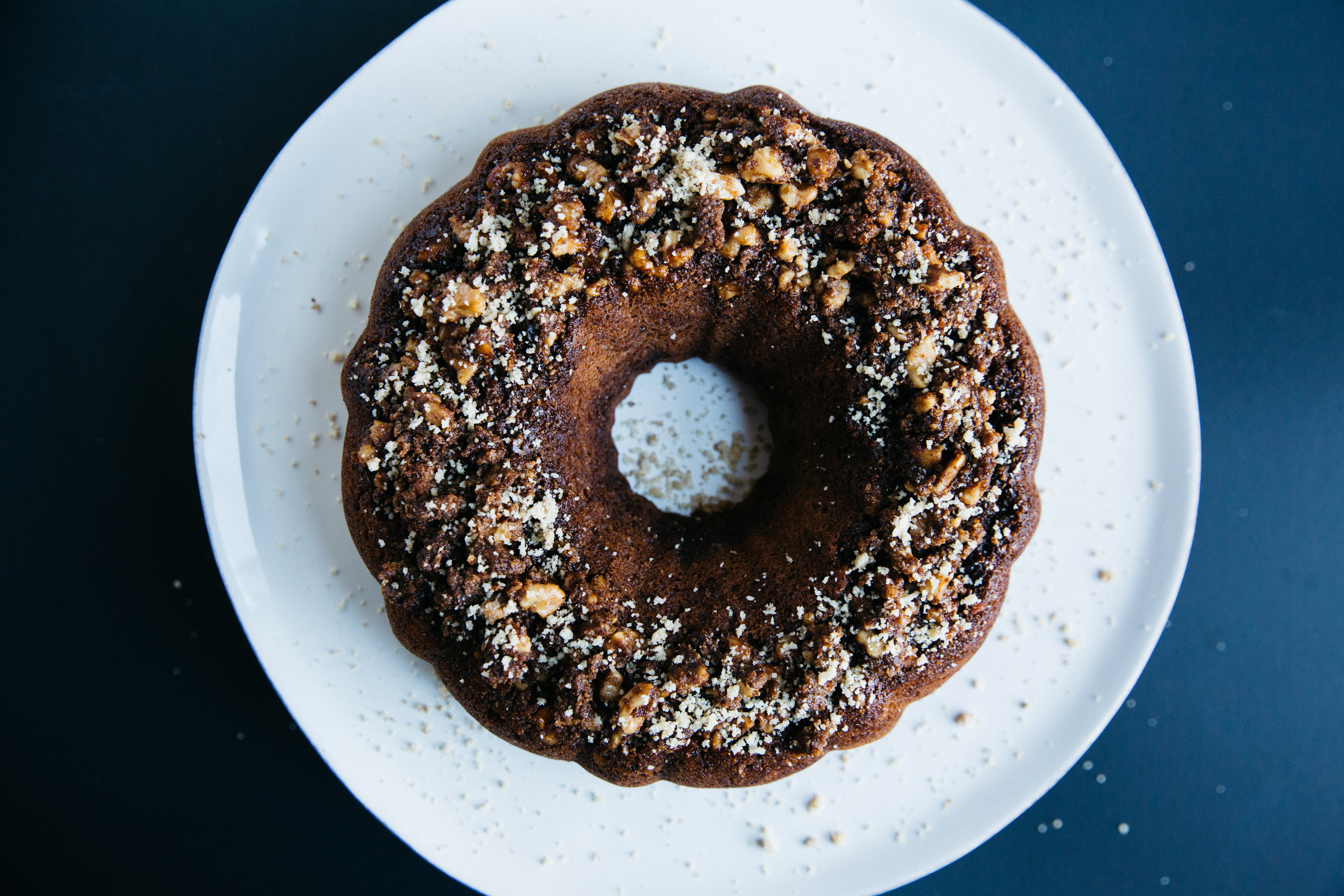
- Coffee cake
- Type: Cake, sweet bread
- Course: Snack, breakfast, coffee break

Coffee cake or coffeecake is a sweet bread common in the United States, so called because it is typically served with coffee. Leavenings can include baking powder or baking soda, but authentic Coffee Cake is make with yeast. The modern dish typically contains no coffee. Outside North America, the term is generally understood to mean a cake flavored with coffee.

== History ==
American coffee cake evolved from other sweet dishes from Vienna. In the 17th century, Northern/Central Europeans are thought to have come up with the idea of eating sweet cakes while drinking coffee. As the region's countries were already known for their sweet yeast breads, the introduction of coffee in Europe led to the understanding that cakes were a great complement to the beverage. Immigrants from countries such as Germany and Scandinavia adjusted their recipes to their own liking and brought them to America. Though the cakes varied, they all contained ingredients such as yeast, flour, dried fruit, and sweet spices. However, over time, the coffee cake recipes have changed as cheese, sugared fruit, yogurt, and soured cream have been used, leading to a denser, more cake-like structure. In the 19th century, American cooks also used coffee as an ingredient to thriftily use up leftovers, reducing waste, and flavor the cake. The introduction of pasteurization to America following World War I also led to the creation of a new kind of coffee cake, called sour cream coffee cake. Coffee cake is referenced in literary material as early as 1850 with references to gugelhupf going back to 1763.

The dish became common in areas with high rates of immigration from Germany such as Cincinnati; as such, Cincinnati has been called the "coffeecake capital of the world" by multiple food writers.

== Description ==
American coffee cakes are typically presented in a single layer flavored with either fruit or cinnamon, and leavened with either baking soda or baking powder, which results in a more cake-like texture, or with yeast, for a more breadlike texture. They may be loaf-shaped or baked in a Bundt or tube pan. They may also feature a streusel or simple glaze topping, if any. Streusel is German for "sprinkle" or "strew" and refers to the popular crumbly topping of butter, flour, sugar. Sour cream is also sometimes used in traditional American coffee cakes to both add a tart flavor and activate baking soda used as a leavening agent.

American coffee cakes may have originated from the concept of kaffeeklatsch brought by German immigrants. Indeed, a variety of crumb cake containing flour, sugar, butter, cinnamon, and sometimes oats or nuts sprinkled over the coffee cake batter before it is baked, is sometimes eaten with coffee and bears resemblance to the German Streuselkuchen.

Sara Lee Pecan Coffee Cake was a premade, frozen coffee cake that was marketed to American families in the 1970s and is remembered nostalgically.

Coffee cake varieties

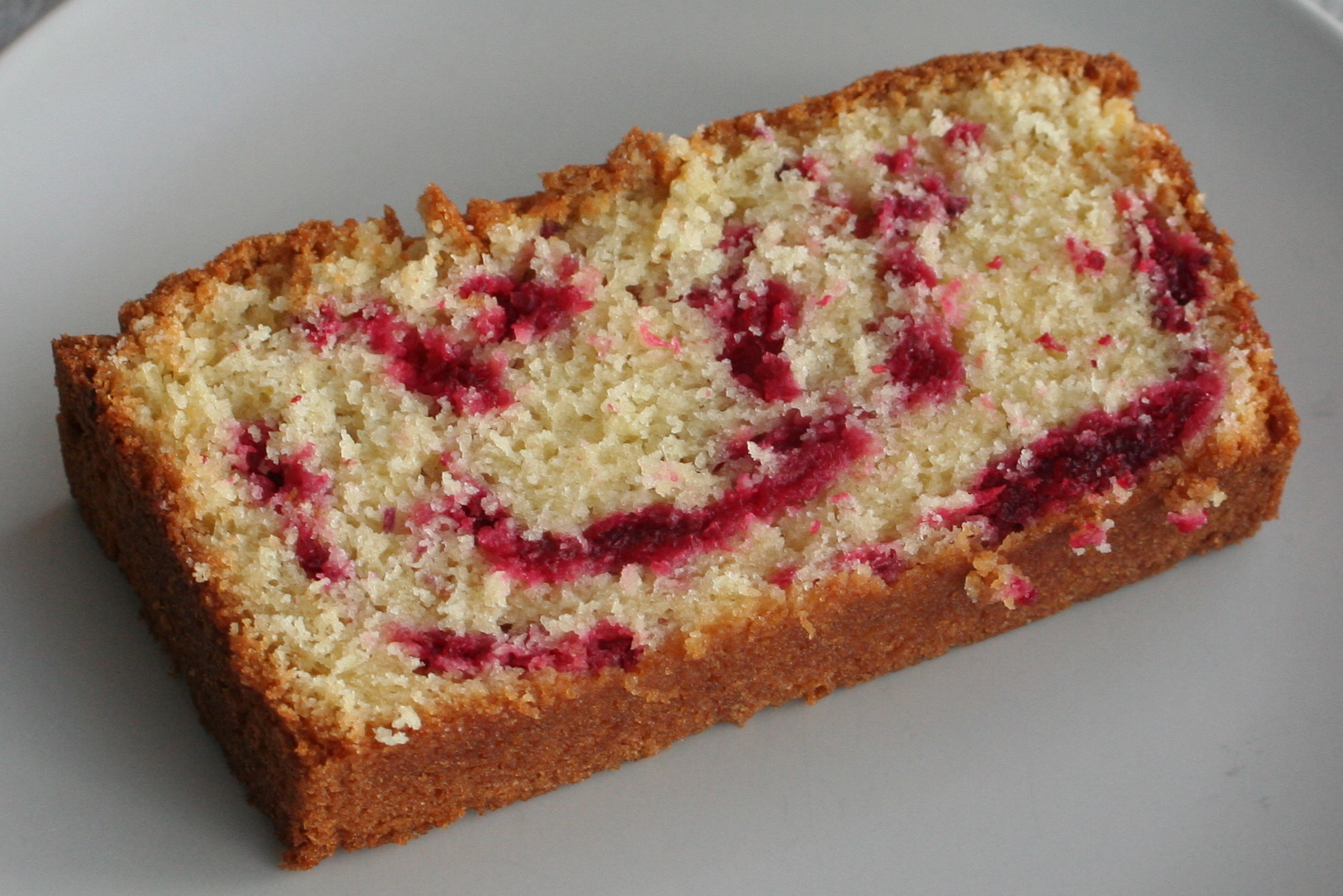
Cranberry coffee cake

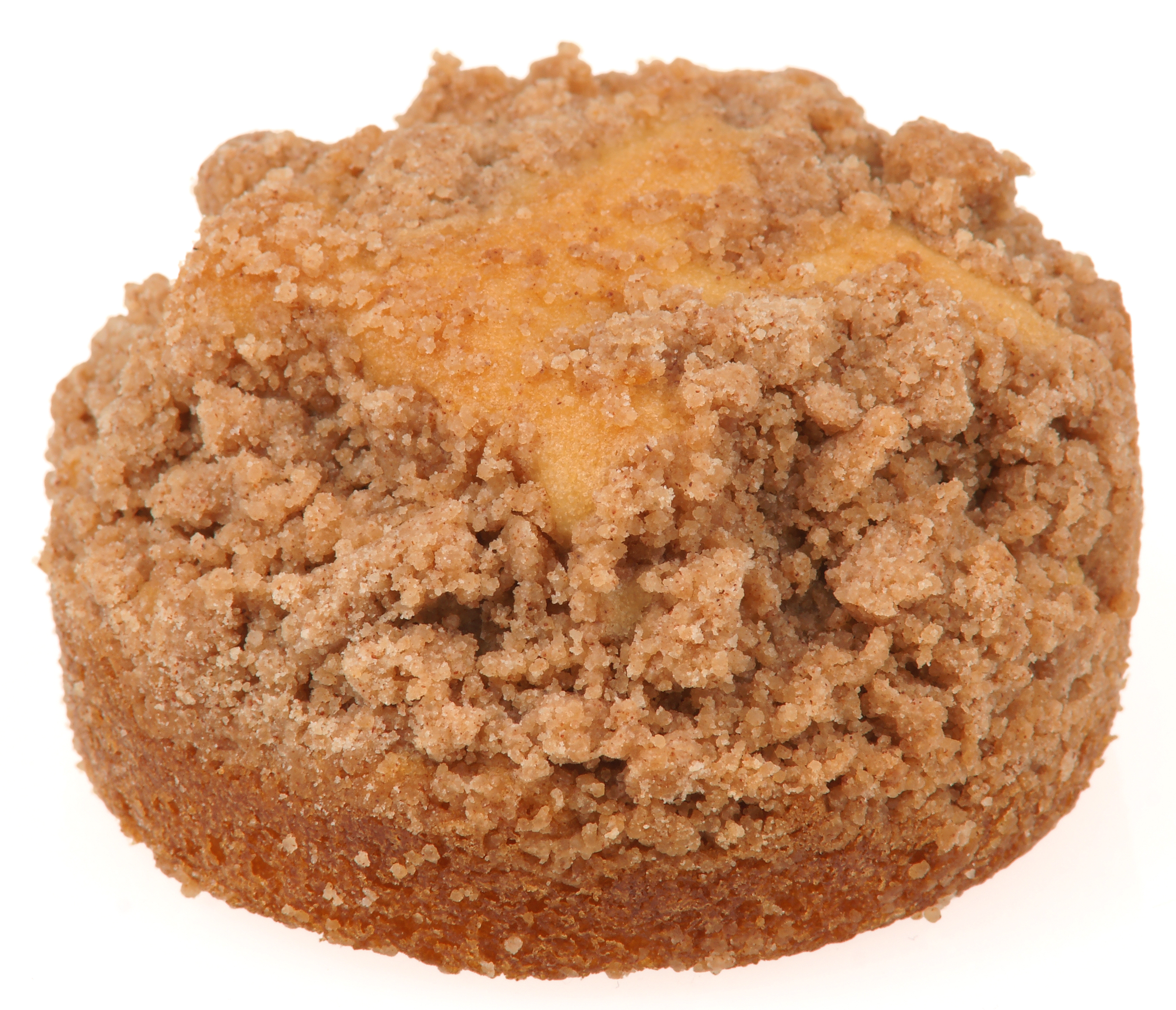
Coffee cake topped with streusel

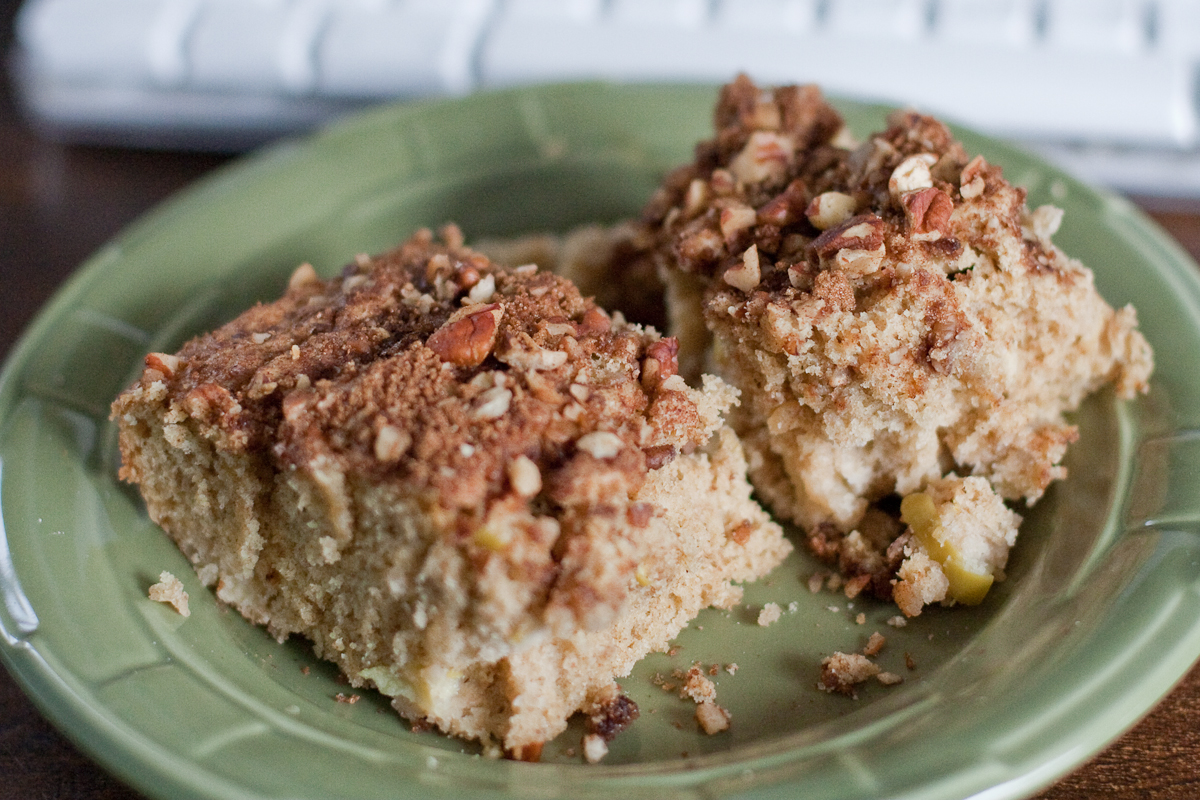
Applesauce American coffee cake slices on a plate

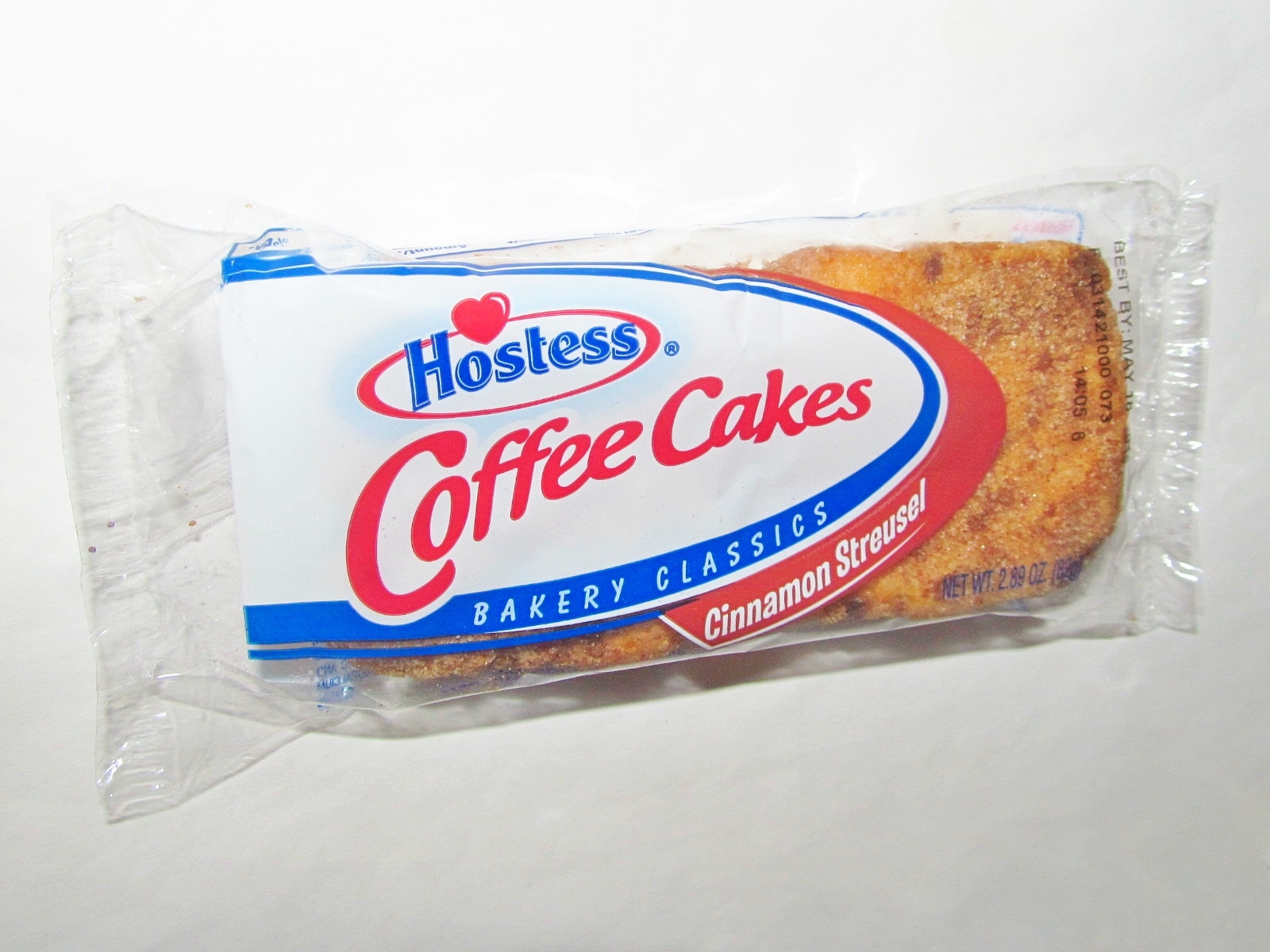
Commercially-produced coffee cake

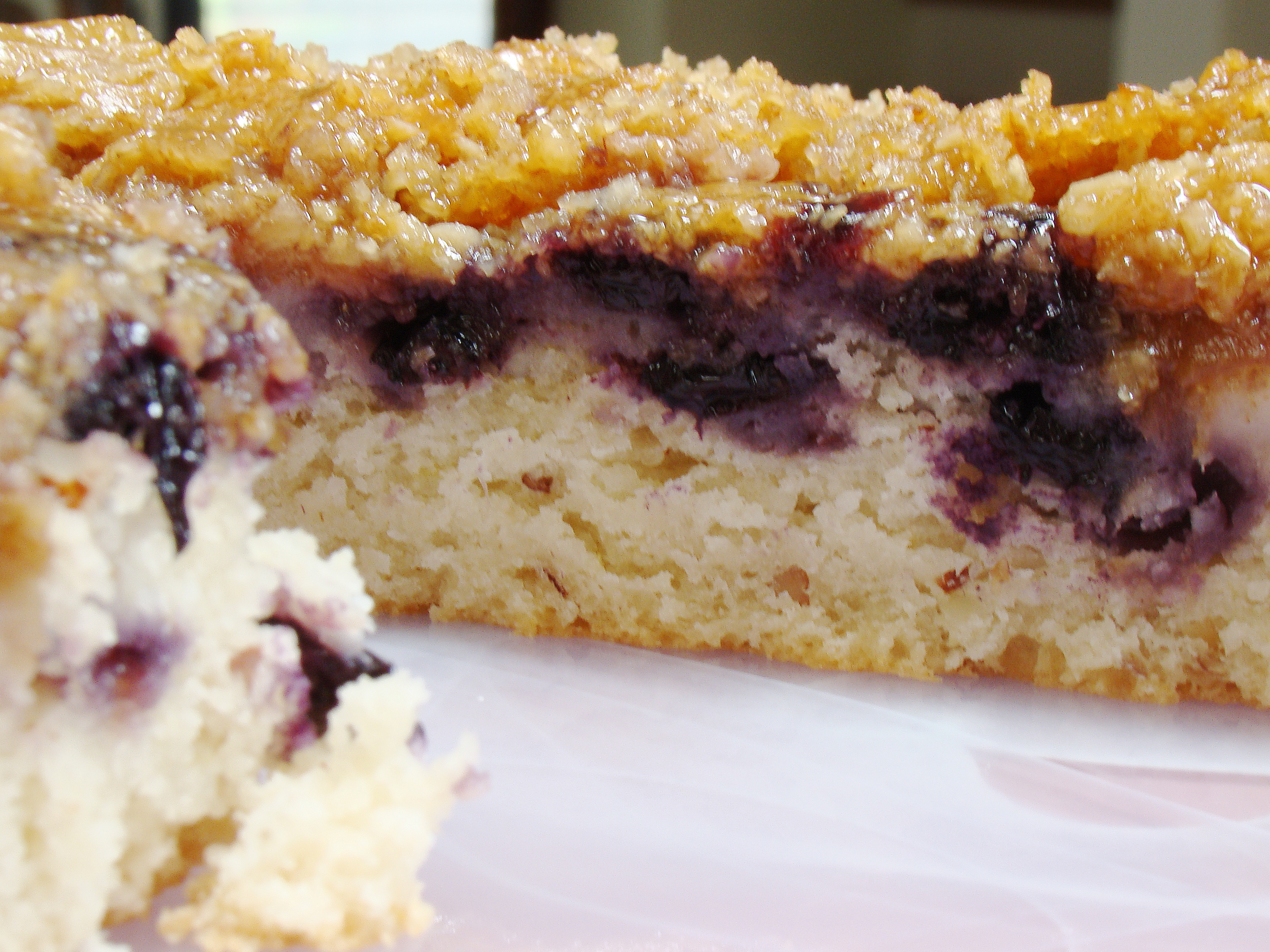
Blueberry coffee cake

== Variations and similar dishes ==
- Applesauce cake is a variety of American coffee cake.
- Clementine cake is a similar dish.
- Gooey butter cake is a St. Louis-style coffee cake.
- Streuselkuchen is a similar German dish.

== Dishes with similar names ==
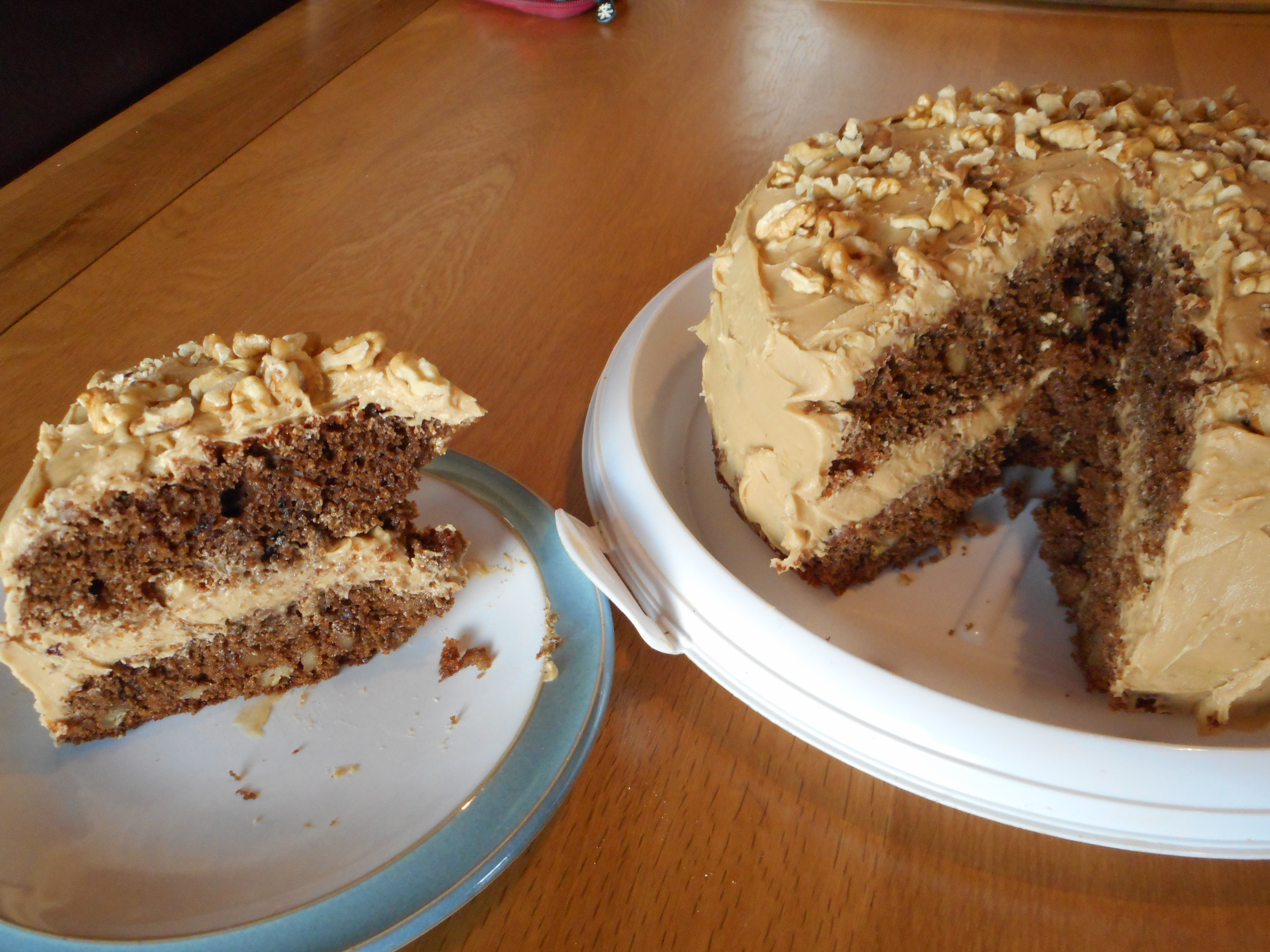
Coffee-flavored layer cake baked in the UK

Outside the United States, the term "coffee cake" is generally understood to be a sponge cake flavored with coffee, often presented as a layer cake with frosting. Examples are tiramisu and coffee and walnut cake.

== See also ==
- Amish friendship bread – has characteristics of both pound cake and American coffee cake
- Bundt cake – a ring-shaped cake similar to Gugelhupf
- Gugelhupf – sometimes served with coffee, during coffee breaks
- List of brunch foods
- List of cakes
- Teacake
- Tiramisu – a well-known coffee-flavored Italian dessert
